= Sounding (Justified) =

- Justified episode
- Episode no.: Season 6 Episode 5
- Directed by: Jon Avnet
- Written by: Dave Andron & Leonard Chang
- Cinematography by: Stefan von Bjorn
- Editing by: Eric L. Beason
- Original air date: February 17, 2015
- Running time: 46 minutes

Guest appearances
- Mary Steenburgen as Katherine Hale; Garret Dillahunt as Ty Walker; Patton Oswalt as Constable Bob Sweeney; Justin Welborn as Carl; Jeff Fahey as Zachariah Randolph; Scott Grimes as Seabass; Demetrius Grosse as Errol; Brad Leland as Calhoun Shreier; Duke Davis Roberts as Choo-Choo Mundo; Danny Strong as Albert Fekus; Ryan Dorsey as Earl; Shawn Parsons as Mr. Handsome; Mykelti Williamson as Ellstin Limehouse; Sam Elliott as Avery Markham

Episode chronology
| ← Previous "The Trash and the Snake" | Next → "Alive Day" |
- Justified (season 6)

"Sounding" is the fifth episode of the sixth season of the American Neo-Western television series Justified. It is the 70th overall episode of the series and was written by executive producer Dave Andron and co-producer Leonard Chang and directed by Jon Avnet. It originally aired on FX on February 17, 2015.

The series is based on Elmore Leonard's stories about the character Raylan Givens, particularly "Fire in the Hole", which serves as the basis for the episode. The series follows Raylan Givens, a tough deputy U.S. Marshal enforcing his own brand of justice. The series revolves around the inhabitants and culture in the Appalachian Mountains area of eastern Kentucky, specifically Harlan County where many of the main characters grew up. In the episode, Ava feels more pressure by her new role that she considers leaving Harlan with Limehouse's help, prompting Raylan to ask Bob Sweeney for help. Meanwhile, Boyd contacts one of Ava's family members for help in their new plan.

According to Nielsen Media Research, the episode was seen by an estimated 1.73 million household viewers and gained a 0.5 ratings share among adults aged 18–49. The episode received mixed-to-positive reviews from critics, with critics conflicted on the pace and lack of character development in the episode.

== Plot ==
After realizing that Ava (Joelle Carter) is nervous about her new role, Raylan (Timothy Olyphant) tells Tim (Jacob Pitts) to check on Albert Fekus (Danny Strong) so he keeps his story straight. Meanwhile, Duffy (Jere Burns) visits Katherine (Mary Steenburgen), sharing his concerns about Ava's behavior, suspecting her of being an informant. Duffy informs her he assigned one of his henchmen to check on Fekus so they can know if the Federals visit him.

After Boyd (Walton Goggins) puts her engagement ring back on her finger, Ava leaves and talks to Raylan on the phone. She is nervous that Boyd might kill her if Katherine passes her information and wants to quit her role. Raylan reminds her that she will return to jail if she quits and based on the very little information she has provided them, going back to prison is becoming more likely. Ava then tells him to meet her at a specific junkyard. Meanwhile, as Tim and Rachel (Erica Tazel) approach Fekus' house, they notice Duffy's man watching the entrance and they pass to avoid suspicion.

Raylan arrives at the junkyard but Ava has not arrived. Finding that she threw her phone off, he contacts Constable Bob Sweeney (Patton Oswalt) for help in finding her, which he agrees to do. Ava went to Nobles Hollow and asks Limehouse (Mykelti Williamson) for help going on the run; lacking enough cash to pay, she offers to show Errol (Demetrius Grosse) a big score in town in exchange for a car. At the Pizza Portal, Walker (Garret Dillahunt) becomes worried when land sales fail to go through, Boyd's crew having threatened owners against selling. Avery (Sam Elliott) is concerned there's a leak in Walker's operation and pressures him to plug it, demanding results.

Boyd hatches a plan to extend a 40-year-old mineshaft and tunnel out the vault. To do this, he and Carl (Justin Welborn) visit expert miner Zachariah Randolph (Jeff Fahey), Ava's uncle who has been at odds with the Crowders over how Bowman treated her. Zachariah is resentful at first, threatening them with a shotgun. Later, Boyd pays Zachariah $10,000 to hear him out on the job, which interests Zachariah. At a hotel room, Fekus is visited by Duffy to get the truth out of Fekus, who claims he's there to meet a prostitute. Under duress of a cattle-prod, Fekus says that he recanted because he loved Ava, and Duffy believes him. Unaware to Duffy, Tim and Rachel are listening in the room next door.

Ava and Errol arrive at a hardware store for equipment, followed by Bob and Raylan. They enter the room, where Bob tries to distract Errol so that Raylan can get Ava away safely without her cover being blown. When Errol resists, Bob is forced to taser him. Raylan then takes Ava outside and questions her state of mind, running without a plan, endangering her future and his case. Meanwhile, Boyd, his crew and Zachariah start cutting into a ventilation shaft, accidentally triggering an ominous methane explosion and causing some of the crew to get brief deafness.

Walker sends Seabass (Scott Grimes) and Choo-Choo (Duke Davis Roberts) to Calhoun (Brad Leland) late that evening, questioning how everyone found out about Avery's interests. After Seabass does his best to intimidate Calhoun with a story of prolonged impact torture, Choo-Choo lays him out with one hit, accidentally killing him much to Seabass's shock. Ava returns to her house, accompanied by Raylan as he still questions her plans to escape. Raylan promises that when the operation ends, he will find Ava a safe place in Witness Protection where she can start over and be happy. Ava then kisses Raylan, who does not rebuff her advances. She then receives a call from Boyd and tells Raylan to leave before he arrives.

== Production ==
=== Development ===
In January 2015, it was reported that the fifth episode of the sixth season would be titled "Sounding", and was to be directed by Jon Avnet and written by executive producer Dave Andron and co-producer Leonard Chang.

=== Writing ===
Regarding the kiss between Raylan and Ava, series developer Graham Yost said, "he's a human being and she's a beautiful woman, and they have this history. He has great affection for her, and he plays such a hard line with her, but how does he really feel about her being with Boyd these past few years? He knows he's responsible for her going back to Harlan 'cause he hooked up with his ex-wife. So it's all very conflicted. But I think he does know that she could be playing him, and he would understand that, not have any great acrimony about it, because he knows that she's in an awful position and she's just trying to stay alive. But he can also be the hard-line Raylan and sort of think, 'Well you put yourself in this position, so don't come crying to me about it.'"

=== Casting ===
Despite being credited, Nick Searcy does not appear in the episode as his respective character.

In November 2014, it was announced that Jeff Fahey would join the series in a guest role as Zachariah Randolph, "a weathered and a little shaky, a man beaten down by hardship and drink. An Old Coot from the hill country, Zachariah can still find his way around an abandoned mine shaft." In December 2014, Patton Oswalt announced that he would return to the show. TVLine mentioned in November 2013 that the character would return on the fifth season but the plans never came to fruition. Yost said, "we knew we wanted to get Bob into the season, but when we hit on this situation — Raylan doesn't want the whole thing to be blown by this, he wants to handle it — Bob became a good choice."

== Reception ==
=== Viewers ===
In its original American broadcast, "Sounding" was seen by an estimated 1.73 million household viewers and gained a 0.5 ratings share among adults aged 18–49, according to Nielsen Media Research. This means that 0.5 percent of all households with televisions watched the episode. This was a 4% increase in viewership from the previous episode, which was watched by 1.65 million viewers with a 0.5 in the 18-49 demographics.

=== Critical reviews ===
"Sounding" received mixed-to-positive reviews from critics. Seth Amitin of IGN gave the episode an "okay" 6.9 out of 10 and wrote in his verdict, "Justified has slowed itself down, which is fine, but lamentable. Something's building. It's clearly there, but we're going to have to wait and be patient. The question is whether or not these interim episodes can hold our interests and this one not only didn't pass the test, but pointed to more of these episodes coming. Hopefully I'm wrong."

Alasdair Wilkins of The A.V. Club gave the episode an "A−" grade and wrote, "In its handling of Ava and Raylan, 'Sounding' suggests we are indeed coming full circle, albeit after taking a most circuitous path back to where the show began." Kevin Fitzpatrick of Screen Crush wrote, "Admittedly not so exciting or revelatory as last week's installment, but a good amount of fun and tension-building, as the web closing in around Harlan grows ever more tangled. Also, 'Balls like Death Stars'. We'll take it."

Alan Sepinwall of HitFix wrote, "Even with the return of Constable Bob and Limehouse, and the addition to the larger ensemble of Jeff Fahey as Ava's uncle Zachariah, 'Sounding' wasn't quite as giddy an affair as our last two episodes, though it was a fairly necessary one from a plot/character standpoint." Jeff Stone of IndieWire gave the episode a "B−" grade and wrote, "Ava might be playing Raylan to ensure he watches out for her, or she might truly care for him again, or it might even be a little of both. It's a great new wrinkle in the three-way dynamic between Raylan, Ava, and Boyd that's powering this season. The stakes keep going up."

Kyle Fowle of Entertainment Weekly wrote, "'Sounding', the fifth episode of the final season of Justified, feels like a bit of a stopgap for the narrative. It's a quiet episode, one of contemplation and careful movement. There are no huge moments, no momentous confrontation. Instead, it's an episode that takes its time to establish where all the characters are both physically and psychologically, which will certainly pay off in the coming episodes." Matt Zoller Seitz of Vulture gave the episode a perfect 5 star rating out of 5 and wrote, "I'm worried that Ava Crowder isn't going to survive through the end of Justified. That seems a likely outcome for almost any of the major characters by this point, but the fear is especially acute in her case, because she's being squeezed from every direction, which has forced her to fall back on what pulp novelists of an earlier era would call 'feminine wiles.'"

James Queally of Los Angeles Times wrote, "On most other shows, an episode such as 'Sounding' would have been a paint-by-numbers race against the clock." Sean McKenna of TV Fanatic gave the episode a 3.9 star rating out of 5 and wrote, "The episode was certainly entertaining, but nowhere near as intense as the other episodes of Justified Season 6." Jack McKinney of Paste gave the episode an 8.7 out of 10 and wrote, "Episode five is not a bad episode by any means. It hits most of the same notes as those that came before it, but somehow it just doesn't sing the way that they did. Worse, most of the problems are the ones I was concerned about when the season began."

=== Accolades ===
TVLine named Joelle Carter the "Performer of the Week" for the week of February 21, 2015, for her performance in the episode. The site wrote, "As FX's Kentucky-fried drama unspools its farewell run, steering Raylan and Boyd toward a final showdown, Ava Crowder is woefully caught in the middle — and this week, you deeply felt it via Carter's performance. As much as acting can be about words and how they are spoken, Carter demonstrated the power of a furled brow or pursed lips."
