= Justified season 6 =

Justified
- Season 6
- Season 6 DVD cover
- No. of episodes: 13

Release
- Original network: FX
- Original release: January 20 – April 14, 2015

Series chronology
- ← Previous; Season 5 Next → City Primeval

The sixth and final season of the American neo-Western television series Justified premiered on January 20, 2015, on FX, and concluded on April 14, 2015, consisting of 13 episodes. The series was developed by Graham Yost based on Elmore Leonard's novels Pronto and Riding the Rap and his short story "Fire in the Hole". Its main character is Raylan Givens, a deputy U.S. Marshal. Timothy Olyphant portrays Givens, a tough federal lawman, enforcing his own brand of justice in his Kentucky hometown. The series is set in the city of Lexington, Kentucky, and the hill country of eastern Kentucky, specifically in and around Harlan. The sixth season was released on DVD and Blu-ray in region 1 on June 2, 2015.

A sequel series, titled Justified: City Primeval, premiered on FX on July 18, 2023.

== Cast and characters ==
=== Main ===
- Timothy Olyphant as Raylan Givens, a suave deputy U.S. marshal who takes on both his nemesis and a dangerous kingpin at the same time.
- Nick Searcy as Art Mullen, the chief deputy of Lexington's marshals office who is on leave after being shot.
- Jere Burns as Wynn Duffy, a volatile and dangerous Dixie Mafia enforcer whose life is put at risk after a dangerous secret is exposed.
- Joelle Carter as Ava Crowder, Boyd's ex-fiancée who is secretly working as an informant for the marshals.
- Jacob Pitts as Tim Gutterson, a Lexington deputy marshal.
- Erica Tazel as Rachel Brooks, the acting chief deputy of Lexington's marshals office.
- Walton Goggins as Boyd Crowder, Raylan's intelligent nemesis who plots to rob a dangerous kingpin.

=== Recurring ===
- Sam Elliott as Avery Markham, a ruthless marijuana kingpin and the former leader of the Dixie Mafia who sets his sights on Harlan's landowners.
- Mary Steenburgen as Katherine Hale, Markham's lover who is secretly working against him.
- Ryan Dorsey as Earl Lennon, Boyd's henchman and Carl's brother.
- Justin Welborn as Carl Lennon, Boyd's henchman and Earl's brother.
- Garret Dillahunt as Ty Walker, Markham's dangerous ex-military henchman who is in charge of the others.
- Jeff Fahey as Zachariah Randolph, Ava's paternal uncle who hates the Crowder family.
- Rick Gomez as David Vasquez, an assistant U.S. attorney who becomes increasingly fed up with both Ava and Raylan.
- Jonathan Kowalsky as Mike Cosmatopolis, Duffy's bodyguard who begins to doubt his loyalty to him.
- Scott Grimes as Sean or "Seabass", Markham's ex-military henchman.
- Kaitlyn Dever as Loretta McCready, a teenage associate of Raylan's who Markham sets his sights on.
- Jonathan Tucker as Boon, Markham's psychopathic marksman.
- Mel Fair as Nelson Dunlop, a Lexington marshal.
- Shawn Parsons as "The Pig", Boyd's henchman.
- Duke Davis Roberts as Mundo or "Choo-Choo", Markham's strong but dim-witted ex-military henchman.
- Mykelti Williamson as Ellstin Limehouse, a crime boss who Ava seeks help from.
- Ashley Dulaney as Caprice, Calhoun's favorite prostitute.
- Brad Leland as Calhoun Schreier, a shady realtor who helps Walker with his land purchases.
- Natalie Zea as Winona Hawkins, Raylan's ex-wife who struggles to raise their infant daughter alone.
- Patton Oswalt as Bob Sweeney, Harlan's good-natured and unimposing constable.
- Tom Proctor as Cope, a "hill person" who crosses paths with Raylan.
- Jeffrey Pierce as Lappicola, a Kentucky state trooper.

=== Guest ===
- Raymond J. Barry as Arlo Givens, Raylan's deceased father who he imagines a conversation with.
- Jake Busey as Lewis Mago, a demolitions expert who is hired by Boyd and Duffy.
- Riley Bodenstab as Derrick Waters, Loretta's ex-boyfriend who tries to protect her from Markham.
- Jeremy Davies as Dickie Bennett, the last of the criminal Bennett family who unintentionally sells his land to an old enemy.
- Demetrius Grosse as Errol Butler, Limehouse's lieutenant who he has forgiven for his duplicity after he saved his life.
- Damon Herriman as Dewey Crowe, a dim-witted criminal who seeks to get back in with Boyd after losing his brothel to the government.
- David Koechner as Greg Sutter, the chief deputy of Miami's marshals office.
- Don McManus as Billy "Wildman" Geist, Ava's lawyer.
- Abby Miller as Ellen May, a former Harlan prostitute who Raylan suspects may have been involved with Ava.
- Rolando Molina as Aguilar, a PF officer who witnessed Boyd kill his cousin.
- Danny Strong as Albert Fekus, a former Harlan county prison guard who is part of Ava's cover story.
- Bill Tangradi as Cyrus Boone, Boyd's henchman.

== Production ==
On January 14, 2014, it was announced that Justified was renewed for a sixth season, which is the final season based on a decision by executive producer Graham Yost and lead actor Timothy Olyphant.

Filming for the season began in September 2014. Also in September 2014, Sam Elliott and Garret Dillahunt (who previously starred with Olyphant on Deadwood), were cast in recurring roles for the final season. In November 2014, Jeff Fahey was cast in a recurring role. In January 2015, it was announced that Jonathan Tucker signed on to play Boon for the final five episodes.

== Episodes ==
No. overall	No. in season	Title	Directed by	Written by	Original release date	US viewers (millions)
66	1	"Fate's Right Hand"	Michael Dinner	Michael Dinner & Fred Golan & Chris Provenzano	January 20, 2015	2.17
A PF officer who found Johnny Crowder's body tells Raylan that Dewey Crowe witnessed his murder. (Note: As depicted in "Raw Deal".) Dewey is released after claiming his confession to killing Wade Messer (Note: As depicted in "Over the Mountain" and "Starvation".) was a joke and gets a restraining order against Raylan to prevent him from being extradited to Mexico. Raylan is approached by a man named Ty Walker, who is interested in buying Arlo Givens's (Note: Raylan's deceased father, first seen in "The Lord of War and Thunder".) property. Dewey asks Boyd for work after Audrey's is confiscated, so he is sent to distract the marshals while Boyd steals a safe deposit box, which he finds a ledger in. Upset that he was used as a decoy, Dewey confronts Boyd and laments about going back to simpler times. Believing he poses a security risk, Boyd kills him and later contemplates a sleeping Ava.
67	2	"Cash Game"	Dean Parisot	Dave Andron & VJ Boyd	January 27, 2015	1.71
Ava discovers the ledger and shows it to Raylan. He meets with realtor Calhoun Schreier to tell him that his box was stolen, which Walker and his associate "Choo-Choo" overhear. The latter tails Raylan, who tricks him and steals his car. Tim, posing as a passing motorist, picks Choo-Choo up and learns that he, Walker, and their associate "Seabass" all work for the same person. Calhoun admits to Raylan that he has been working with the men and that the ledger contained information that could blackmail them. Boyd tries to sell it back to him, but Raylan intercepts him and takes it. Ava realizes that Calhoun has stored his money in a discontinued bank built below the Pizza Portal restaurant. Walker and Seabass approach the house of the Hutchinses, a couple who refused to sell to them, carrying plastic sheets.
68	3	"Noblesse Oblige"	Peter Weller	Taylor Elmore & Benjamin Cavell	February 3, 2015	2.01
At Boyd's urging, Ava visits Pizza Portal and photographs a vault in the basement. Trying to figure out where Boyd gets his explosives, Raylan questions their former mining associate Luther Kent. Boyd sends Carl Lennon's brother Earl to get explosives from Kent's son, but Raylan catches them trying to steal the weapons. Kent takes the blame for supplying Boyd despite Raylan warning him his son may go to jail anyway. The Crowders are visited by Walker's boss Avery Markham, the former leader of the Dixie Mafia, who warns them to never return to Pizza Portal, but this only leaves Boyd more determined to rob and kill him. He comments on how different Ava has been after getting out of prison, but she distracts him by having sex with him.
69	4	"The Trash and the Snake"	Adam Arkin	Chris Provenzano & Ingrid Escajeda	February 10, 2015	1.65
After Ava proves her loyalty to Katherine Hale, Katherine admits her belief that Markham, her lover, was the one who sold out his partner and her deceased husband Grady to the police. She questions Ava about Albert Fekus recanting. (Note: As depicted in "Restitution".) Duffy's explosives expert blows himself up while testing a bomb on a replica of Markham's safe. The Hutchinses are found dead of supposed carbon monoxide poisoning, but Tim finds evidence that they suffocated when their doors and windows were sealed in their sleep. Raylan learns that Dickie Bennett (Note: The surviving member of the criminal Bennett family, "The Moonshine War".) unwittingly sold the last of his land to Loretta McCready, (Note: A teenage girl previously involved with Harlan's criminal Bennett family, first seen in "The Moonshine War".) which Walker tries to buy. Raylan arrives before he can hurt her, so Walker calls Markham and Raylan meets him for the first time. He fails to persuade Loretta to get out of the marijuana business, while Boyd plots to buy up land before Markham so he can grow drugs himself.
70	5	"Sounding"	Jon Avnet	Dave Andron & Leonard Chang	February 17, 2015	1.73
Rachel and Tim get to Fekus before Duffy can, convincing him to withstand Duffy's torture until he buys the cover story. Ava leads Raylan to a fake meetup and runs to Ellstin Limehouse (Note: A Harlan crime boss, first seen in "Cut Ties".) for help, who agrees to give her a car in exchange for her showing Errol Butler (Note: Limehouse's lieutenant, first seen in "Cut Ties".) to a stash of money. Knowing he cannot be seen with Ava and out her as an informant, Raylan has Bob Sweeney (Note: Harlan's good-natured constable, first seen in "Hole in the Wall".) take her from Errol. When Boyd begins interfering with Markham's purchases, Seabass and Choo-Choo interrogate Calhoun, who the latter accidentally kills. Planning to tunnel into the vault using an old mineshaft, Boyd hires Ava's uncle Zachariah Randolph despite his hatred of the Crowder family. Ava kisses Raylan when he promises to get her put in WITSEC, but they are interrupted by Boyd coming home.
71	6	"Alive Day"	Peter Werner	Benjamin Cavell & Jennifer Kennedy	February 24, 2015	1.81
Markham proposes to Katherine despite believing that she sold out Grady. Walker orders Choo-Choo to kill Calhoun's favorite prostitute, who saw Walker and Seabass enter his office. Choo-Choo picks her up, but is moved by her genuine kindness and expresses hesitation to Walker. Markham orders Walker to kill them both, but he is interrupted by Raylan and Tim. They fail to convince Choo-Choo that Walker is there to kill him and engage in a gunfight, during which both henchmen are shot. They escape and Choo-Choo tries to commit suicide by train, but dies of his injuries before it can hit him. Art pulls the files on Grady's arrest. Boyd falls in a hole while working in the shaft and is rescued by Zachariah. Before one of Boyd's men can realize Zachariah cut the boards covering the hole, he pushes him in to his death. Limehouse tells Boyd of Ava's visit.
72	7	"The Hunt"	John Dahl	Taylor Elmore & Keith Schreier	March 3, 2015	1.73
Markham cuts ties with Walker after Rachel puts an APB out. Walker calls an ambulance when his car breaks down, killing the paramedics and stealing their supplies. Boyd forces Ava to go to his father's cabin with him, where they fight about the Crowder family's patterns of violence before having sex. The next day, he reveals he knows about Limehouse and suspects Raylan took her away from Errol. She admits that she is working as an informant. Realizing it is his fault for not protecting her in prison, he forgives her and tells her to keep working for Raylan until they can run away together. Instead of participating in the manhunt for Walker, Raylan takes time off to see Winona when she comes to town. She tells him she wants to raise Willa Givens together, and he promises to do so.
73	8	"Dark As a Dungeon"	Gwyneth Horder-Payton	Chris Provenzano & VJ Boyd	March 10, 2015	1.80
Raylan cleans out Arlo's house and prepares to have his parents' remains moved to a Harlan cemetery. Walker breaks into Ava's house and forces her to tend to his wounds. When Boyd arrives, Walker offers to give him the combination to the vault. Raylan convinces Markham to put out a bounty on Walker and visits Boyd, who gives him up upon hearing of the reward. Walker shoots at Raylan while escaping and is killed. Boyd observes Markham taking his reward money from the vault. Ava is happy to accept the bounty, but Boyd is more determined than ever to rob Markham after seeing how much money he has. While Ava tells Raylan about the shaft, he realizes from her demeanor that she has been compromised. He imagines a conversation with Arlo in his shed about his childhood fear of the place, and later has his parents' tombstones removed without exhuming them.
74	9	"Burned"	Don Kurt	Dave Andron & Leonard Chang & Jenny DeArmitt	March 17, 2015	1.81
Art and Raylan reveal to Duffy that they have documents confirming he sold out Grady, forcing him to cooperate with them. Katherine kills Seabass when he tries to extort her and Markham. Duffy falsely claims to Boyd that Markham is moving his money during a Pizza Portal party that night. Loretta agrees to help Boyd buy up land after Boon, Markham's sharpshooter henchman, threatens her. At the party, Markham tries to convince the locals to sell their land, but Loretta wins them over by explaining how Markham wants to buy them out. Guessing that Raylan has found her out, Ava warns Raylan of Boyd's incoming robbery, and Raylan informs Markham. When Boyd lights an explosive fuse, Zachariah chains him to a post and leaves him to die, though Carl narrowly saves him. The explosives fail to breach the vault and Markham makes plans to move the money.
75	10	"Trust"	Adam Arkin	Benjamin Cavell	March 24, 2015	1.72
Ava finds Dewey's necklace at Boyd's bar. The marshals set up a decoy truck that they pretend has Markham's money to mislead Boyd, though Raylan correctly suspects he will see through it. The Lennons are sent after it and are arrested. Boon kills Loretta's great-aunt to eliminate any successors to her land. Mike Cosmatopolis (Note: Duffy's bodyguard, first seen in "Save My Love".) realizes Duffy flipped on Grady, restraining him and calling Katherine. She and Boyd set up a fake hostage situation to force Markham to give up his money, which works, though Boyd reveals Katherine's deception before leaving. David Vasquez (Note: An assistant US attorney working on the RICO case, first seen in "The Lord of War and Thunder".) plans to send Ava back to prison, so she offers to get Boyd to confess to Dewey's murder. She meets with him to receive the money and leave Harlan together, only to take his gun, shoot him, and drive off with the money.
76	11	"Fugitive Number One"	Jon Avnet	Taylor Elmore & Keith Schreier	March 31, 2015	1.96
Art comes back from leave to take over the hunt for Ava. A hospitalized Boyd advises Raylan to find Zachariah. He and Ava flee into the mountains, but find the man who was to help her escape dead. Markham approaches the Lennons and orders Carl to kill Boyd or he will kill Earl. Carl infiltrates Boyd's room and is convinced to free him, only for Boyd to kill him and escape. Vasquez accuses Raylan of conspiring with Ava and Art tells him to come back to Lexington, but he instead rescues Earl when he learns of Boyd's escape. Katherine arrives at Duffy's RV and prepares to kill him, but she and Mike kill each other when he tries to convince her to have mercy. Raylan warns Markham to not search for Ava or Earl will testify against him. Art gives Raylan two days to catch Boyd and promises to arrest him if he does not comply.
77	12	"Collateral"	Michael Pressman	Chris Provenzano & VJ Boyd	April 7, 2015	1.83
Boyd kidnaps a man and commandeers his car. Raylan encounters the hill people, (Note: First seen in "Kin".) displaced by pollution, and gives them Arlo's land. Duffy makes plans to leave the country. Loretta hides with Derrick Waters, (Note: Loretta's boyfriend, first seen in "The Kids Aren't All Right".) only for Boon to find and hold them. Markham kills Derrick, but Loretta convinces him to spare her by promising to sway Harlan to his side. Ava flees with some of the money after learning of Boyd's escape, being caught by Bob, who is looking for Raylan after the APB put out by Vasquez. Boyd kills the driver when he offends him and Bob investigates the gunshot, getting shot by Boyd. Ava runs and is caught by Markham's men. Raylan finds Boyd and they debate about the former's motivations while trying to kill each other, though Boyd escapes. He encounters Zachariah, who blows himself up while trying to kill Boyd rather than give up Ava. Raylan drives Bob to the hospital, but is arrested upon arrival.
78	13	"The Promise"	Adam Arkin	Graham Yost & Fred Golan & Dave Andron & Benjamin Cavell	April 14, 2015	2.24
Raylan persuades Art to free him. Ava tricks Boon into going to a fake handoff, to which he takes Loretta. Raylan beats Markham's henchman until he gives up his location, while Boyd finds Markham and kills him. Raylan arrives before he can kill Ava, and Boyd tries to provoke him into killing him. Raylan allows him to be arrested and drives Ava away, but they are cut off by Boon and Loretta. Boon and Raylan duel and shoot each other, but Loretta steps on Boon's hand to stop him from finishing off Raylan. Boon dies of his injuries and Ava drives off in Raylan's car. Four years later, Raylan works with Greg Sutter (Note: A Miami deputy marshal, first seen in "A Murder of Crowes".) in Miami and has a healthy relationship with Winona, despite being separated, and Willa. Rachel sends him a California newspaper article with Ava in the background of a photo, which he uses to track her down and finds that she has a young son. Knowing Boyd will stop at nothing to find her if he learns of this, she begs Raylan for help. He visits Boyd, now a prison preacher, and convinces him Ava died in a car accident. Boyd asks him why he told him this in person, then realizes it is because "we dug coal together," to which Raylan responds "that's right." The episode is dedicated to the residents of Harlan, the United States Marshal Service, and Elmore Leonard, the author of the stories the series is based on.

== Reception ==
=== Critical response ===
The sixth season has received critical acclaim from television critics, and has a Metacritic rating of 89 out of 100 based on 11 reviews. It currently holds a 100% rating on Rotten Tomatoes with an average rating of 9 out of 10 based on 25 reviews with a critics consensus stating, "Justified returns to form for its endgame, rebounding with crisp storytelling and colorful characters who never take themselves too seriously."

=== Accolades ===
For the 5th Critics' Choice Television Awards, it was nominated for Best Drama Series and received four acting nominations–Timothy Olyphant for Best Actor in a Drama Series, Walton Goggins for Best Supporting Actor in a Drama Series, Joelle Carter for Best Supporting Actress in a Drama Series, and Sam Elliott won for Best Guest Performer in a Drama Series. For the 31st TCA Awards, the series was nominated for Outstanding Achievement in Drama.
