= The Trash and the Snake =

- Justified episode
- Episode no.: Season 6 Episode 4
- Directed by: Adam Arkin
- Written by: Chris Provenzano & Ingrid Escajeda
- Cinematography by: Attila Szalay
- Editing by: Steven Polivka & Jean Crupper
- Original air date: February 10, 2015
- Running time: 43 minutes

Guest appearances
- Mary Steenburgen as Katherine Hale; Jeremy Davies as Dickie Bennett; Garret Dillahunt as Ty Walker; David Brisbin as Winston; Jake Busey as Lewis Mago; Kaitlyn Dever as Loretta McCready; Brad Leland as Calhoun Shreier; Sam Elliott as Avery Markham

Episode chronology
← Previous "Noblesse Oblige"	Next → "Sounding"
- Justified (season 6)

"The Trash and the Snake" is the fourth episode of the sixth season of the American Neo-Western television series Justified. It is the 69th overall episode of the series and was written by co-executive producer Chris Provenzano and supervising producer Ingrid Escajeda and directed by Adam Arkin. It originally aired on FX on February 10, 2015.

The series is based on Elmore Leonard's stories about the character Raylan Givens, particularly "Fire in the Hole", which serves as the basis for the episode. The series follows Raylan Givens, a tough deputy U.S. Marshal enforcing his own brand of justice. The series revolves around the inhabitants and culture in the Appalachian Mountains area of eastern Kentucky, specifically Harlan County where many of the main characters grew up. In the episode, Ava feels nervous when she fears Katherine may suspect her involvement with the authorities in bringing Boyd down. Meanwhile, Raylan and Tim investigate deaths that may be associated to Walker while Boyd and Duffy make a visit to a vault specialist, which culminates in disastrous results.

According to Nielsen Media Research, the episode was seen by an estimated 1.65 million household viewers and gained a 0.5 ratings share among adults aged 18–49, making it the series' least watched episode. The episode received positive reviews from critics, who praised the writing, humor, performances and directing.

== Plot ==
After having sex, Boyd (Walton Goggins) leaves Ava (Joelle Carter) to meet with Duffy (Jere Burns) downstairs. Ava also leaves and secretly meets with Raylan (Timothy Olyphant), telling her about the meeting they had with Avery (Sam Elliott) and Walker (Garret Dillahunt), with Raylan knowing the latter. When she returns to her room, she finds Katherine (Mary Steenburgen) waiting for her.

While investigating more about the ledger and Avery, Raylan and Tim (Jacob Pitts) are told by Calhoun (Brad Leland) that the older couple, whom Walker previously visited a few days ago, has died from carbon monoxide poisoning. Raylan and Tim suspect Avery's involvement as their names were found in the ledger as people who refused to sell their property. Duffy (Jere Burns) introduces Boyd to specialist Lewis "The Wiz" Mago (Jake Busey), who attempts to break open a similar vault but accidentally vaporizes himself when a cell phone rings, much to their shock.

Ava ends up having to do cocaine and participate in high-ticket shoplifting to convince Katherine she's not an informant. Katherine reveals her belief that Avery ratted out Grady, who supposedly committed suicide in prison, and she reveals she is robbing Avery to avenge her husband and regain her lost lifestyle. At the end of the day, Katherine asks about Albert Fekus' change of heart, worrying Ava and causing her to exit their hotel room to avoid any more conversations with her.

Raylan and Tim visit Dickie Bennett (Jeremy Davies) in prison learning that he unknowingly sold his ancestral land to Loretta McCready (Kaitlyn Dever), putting her on Avery's radar. Walker has already met with Loretta at her house, offering her a large sum of money but she is not interested. She also offers him the Bennett's poisoned apple pie moonshine and Walker nearly drinks until they are interrupted by Raylan and Tim. As Loretta has turned down his offer, Walker turns hostile but Raylan and Tim threaten him to hold his gun.

Walker ends up calling Avery to meet with them at Loretta's house. Raylan lets them know he's keeping an eye on them and won't let them strong-arm Loretta, though Avery questions Raylan's own forceful tactics. Knowing that Loretta won't give up on her marijuana business, Raylan asks her to get a couple big bodyguards. He then receives a call from Ava, who got scared from her talk with Katherine, suspecting that she knows she is an informant. As she packs her stuff from the hotel, Boyd enters the room. He says that after learning that Avery is buying up farms to grow soon-to-be-legal cannabis, he has decided to get the land first and ensure his fortune in Harlan.

== Production ==
=== Development ===
In January 2015, it was reported that the fourth episode of the sixth season would be titled "The Trash and the Snake", and was to be directed by Adam Arkin and written by co-executive producer Chris Provenzano and supervising producer Ingrid Escajeda.

=== Writing ===
Co-writer Ingrid Escajeda created "The Wiz" character. According to series developer Graham Yost, casting Jake Busey as the character was "just this guy who is so cocky and self-important and grandiose." The writers enjoyed the idea of having his character explode, "there's nothing any grander than that." Director Adam Arkin indicated that the actors keep their eyes open during the scene. Actor Jere Burns struggled to keep his eyes open due to the spray of fake blood that covered his character. Actor Jake Busey described the role as "it's every actor's dream to get on a show and have your name spray-painted on a parking spot. We don't get that."

There was a deleted scene, which involved Boyd and Duffy cleaning up the room after the Wiz's death. The Wiz's wife, Bridget (portrayed by Rebekah Brandes), arrives at the scene and sees the aftermath of the events. Duffy then proceeds to buy her silence with money, telling her to stop talking. When she says "Well, that's a start", Duffy shoots her in the head. On deleting the scene, Yost said, "we just felt that with the propulsion of the episode, it just wasn't necessary."

=== Casting ===
Despite being credited, Erica Tazel does not appear in the episode as her respective character.

The episode brought back Jeremy Davies as Dickie Bennett. On bringing him back, Yost said, "we knew that we wanted someone else who appears in the episode, our lovely Loretta McCready. She came out of the weed business; the Bennetts were in the weed business. We all felt it was part and parcel of what Markham is in town to do, and so we liked the idea of Loretta putting down stakes and saying she's taking the money that she got from Mags and she's going to get in that business. The primo land would be the Bennett land — we just liked the idea of her snaking that land out from under Dickie and what his reaction would be. The whole thing is just for him to howl in pain, 'Loretta!'"

== Reception ==
=== Viewers ===
In its original American broadcast, "The Trash and the Snake" was seen by an estimated 1.65 million household viewers and gained a 0.5 ratings share among adults aged 18–49, according to Nielsen Media Research. This means that 0.5 percent of all households with televisions watched the episode. This was a 18% decrease in viewership from the previous episode, which was watched by 2.01 million viewers with a 0.7 in the 18-49 demographics.

=== Critical reviews ===
"The Trash and the Snake" received positive reviews from critics. Seth Amitin of IGN gave the episode a "good" 7.8 out of 10 and wrote in his verdict, "'The Trash and the Snake' wasn't a step back from the frenetic tension of the previous two episodes, but it was a break from it. However, it did allow for the story to breathe a bit and allowed some room for dark humor, which may be better in the long run. It isn't Justified at its best, but it is Justified through and through. Looks like the slow burn is back on."

Alasdair Wilkins of The A.V. Club gave the episode an "A" grade and wrote, "More than that, as this episode illustrates, there's only the flimsiest of differences between the trash and the snake, at least when it comes to Harlan's criminal elements. After all, when Boyd is what passes for the small fry in this metaphor, there are no small fries. And Raylan is liable to get bit no matter what he does." Kevin Fitzpatrick of Screen Crush wrote, "It's a nice bit of wild card menace that neatly compliments Sam Elliott's more reserved brand of villainy, and both let just the right amount of cards show to promise some hefty confrontations in the weeks to come. Good thing, considering how far the final season seems willing to stretch Ava's anxiety over feeding information to Raylan, and the need for an imminent turn. So too could Raylan use a bit of reflection on his own arc across the first few episodes of the season, but good golly, if Justified was figuratively, and literally on fire with its most exciting final season hour yet."

Alan Sepinwall of HitFix wrote, "With 'The Trash and the Snake', I'm tempted to bust out the old dayenu gimmick and be done with it, because this episode was overflowing with moments and character interactions that on their own would have been enough to make a memorable episode. This one was so much fun – so full of all the people, things and events that have made Justified such a blast for so long – that it feels like it went past the legal limits for entertainment on a Tuesday night. Or, it did until Avery Markham and his people pay enough money to get an episode this good legalized right along with marijuana in the fine state of Kentucky." Jeff Stone of IndieWire gave the episode an "A−" grade and wrote, "Joelle Carter's been doing great work this season, and her scenes with Katherine and Boyd this episode particularly stand out. Her shift from fake joy to genuine tears as Boyd pitches the idea of stealing not just Markham's money, but his plans for Harlan, is fantastic. With Ava, Boyd, Raylan, Katherine, and Markham all at odds, there’s no ceiling on how high this season can climb."

Kyle Fowle of Entertainment Weekly wrote, "Justified has always done a wonderful job balancing it's gritty noir and Western tendencies with a solid dose of humor. The best episodes of the show are often funny and thrilling all at once. 'The Trash And The Snake' is one of those episodes. It boasts a handful of intense scenes that see characters backed into corners, but also adds levity when needed." Matt Zoller Seitz of Vulture gave the episode a perfect 5 star rating out of 5 and wrote, "Justified isn't ordinarily the sort of show to hand you a theme on a platter, but we're deep into the final season now, and things are getting deeper and darker by the week, so it makes sense that the series would want to frame its endgame."

James Queally of Los Angeles Times wrote, "While the episode had a ton of solid character moments for Raylan, Boyd, Ava and their intertwined arcs, it was also the first installment of the season to try and give equal weight to all three stories, creating something of a crowded and oddly placed episode." Sean McKenna of TV Fanatic gave the episode a 4 star rating out of 5 and wrote, "Justified, even if things aren't moving at break-neck pace, finds a way to be entertaining, including with its massive collection of characters. A little more clarity was revealed to Avery's plan, but I feel like the coils of tension are about to be released and that downward slide towards the finish is about to begin." Jack McKinney of Paste gave the episode a 9.3 out of 10 and wrote, "So much happened so fast this week that I'm still trying to process it all. As we arrive at roughly the one third mark of the season, it appears that the writers have suddenly realized how little time they actually have left, and are in a rush to get it all in. If it's all this good, that's fine by me."
