= Noblesse Oblige (Justified) =

- Justified episode
- Episode no.: Season 6 Episode 3
- Directed by: Peter Weller
- Written by: Taylor Elmore & Benjamin Cavell
- Cinematography by: Stefan von Bjorn
- Editing by: Keith Henderson & Sandra McCallig
- Original air date: February 3, 2015
- Running time: 46 minutes

Guest appearances
- Mary Steenburgen as Katherine Hale; Garret Dillahunt as Ty Walker; Rick Gomez as AUSA David Vasquez; Justin Welborn as Carl; Brent Briscoe as Luther Kent; Scott Grimes as Seabass; Duke Davis Roberts as Choo-Choo Mundo; Ryan Dorsey as Earl; Patrick Carlyle as Tyler Kent; Sam Elliott as Avery Markham

Episode chronology
← Previous "Cash Game"	Next → "The Trash and the Snake"
- Justified (season 6)

"Noblesse Oblige" is the third episode of the sixth season of the American Neo-Western television series Justified. It is the 68th overall episode of the series and was written by executive producer Taylor Elmore and co-executive producer Benjamin Cavell and directed by Peter Weller. It originally aired on FX on February 3, 2015.

The series is based on Elmore Leonard's stories about the character Raylan Givens, particularly "Fire in the Hole", which serves as the basis for the episode. The series follows Raylan Givens, a tough deputy U.S. Marshal enforcing his own brand of justice. The series revolves around the inhabitants and culture in the Appalachian Mountains area of eastern Kentucky, specifically Harlan County where many of the main characters grew up. In the episode, Ava feels pressured by Raylan, Rachel and Gomez to deliver more solid evidence against Boyd or face going back to prison. Meanwhile, Boyd gets into trouble when he starts investigating more about the target of the robbery.

According to Nielsen Media Research, the episode was seen by an estimated 2.01 million household viewers and gained a 0.7 ratings share among adults aged 18–49. The episode received critical acclaim, who praised the performances (with many highlighting Joelle Carter and Sam Elliott), writing, and character development.

== Plot ==
Ava (Joelle Carter) and Boyd (Walton Goggins) spend the night drinking bourbon at the bar. Ava later meets Raylan (Timothy Olyphant), Rachel (Erica Tazel) and Vasquez (Rick Gomez) at Arlo's property. They outline the terms of her confidential informant agreement – though to Ava it sounds like they want her to take greater risks, to come back with solid evidence or die trying.

At the bar, Boyd's crew are discussing the Pizza Portal when Walker (Garret Dillahunt) arrives and informs them that they didn't rob Calhoun, but his boss, warning of consequences should they continue their course. Boyd dismisses Walker's threats. Raylan and Rachel then question Luther Kent (Brent Briscoe), an old friend of Boyd and Raylan during their coal mining days. After checking his books, they find that they don't add up, deducing that Boyd takes his explosives from there. Ava visits the Pizza Portal, slipping down to the basement and taking pictures of the old vault for Boyd. She is caught by Choo-Choo (Duke Davis Roberts) and is escorted by him to her car, where she gives him a fake name, Ava Randolph.

Boyd's crew discusses the photos of the vault, where Boyd states that Earl (Ryan Dorsey) is getting the explosives from Luther and orders him to get more. Earl visits Luther's son, Tyler (Patrick Carlyle), to force him to hand over explosives when Raylan and Rachel arrive and interrupt their meeting. The next day, they attempt to rob explosives from Luther's company but Raylan and Rachel catch them and arrest them in front of Luther. Luther then takes the fall for his son in order to avoid prison time. Raylan fails to convince him, with Luther telling him he would do the same if Raylan's daughter did the same thing.

Boyd is kidnapped at the bar by Seabass (Scott Grimes) and Choo-Choo, taking him to a barn to torture him for sending Ava to watch them in the Pizza Portal. They bind him in a stress position until morning, then set him free saying he will receive no further warnings. Meanwhile, Ava is visited by Walker and Avery Markham (Sam Elliott), who makes comments about her present and future status with Boyd. As the night sets in, Boyd arrives at the house to find Ava, Avery and Walker. Boyd knows Avery and apologizes for trying to rob him. Avery accepts his apology but who threatens to kill both Ava and Boyd if he sees them in the Pizza Portal again.

Boyd then visits Duffy (Jere Burns) and Katherine (Mary Steenburgen), confronting them for hiring him in robbing Avery despite his dangerous status. Katherine explains her relationship with Avery, also stating that had they told him the target from the beginning, Boyd wouldn't have accepted the job. But despite the dangerous situation, Boyd says he will still go with the robbery and coldly states he will kill Avery himself. Boyd and Ava then sleep on a hotel room, where Ava tries to get information about the robbery. When Boyd notes she has changed since prison, Ava deflects the moment by seducing Boyd.

== Production ==
=== Development ===
In January 2015, it was reported that the third episode of the sixth season would be titled "Noblesse Oblige", and was to be directed by Peter Weller and written by executive producer Taylor Elmore and co-executive producer Benjamin Cavell.

=== Writing ===
The first meeting between Boyd and Walker involved more back-and-forth talking between both of them. Actor Walton Goggins then suggested that Boyd eats a cheeseburger during the scene and the writers agreed with his request. Series developer Graham Yost said, "it was a different way to go and something that, much to the chagrin of the writer sometimes, we look at and go, 'Yeah, that was the right way.'"

=== Casting ===
Despite being credited, Nick Searcy and Jacob Pitts do not appear in the episode as their respective characters.

=== Filming ===
Peter Weller was interested in directing for the series after directing episodes from Sons of Anarchy. He was suggested by executive producer Michael Dinner and the producers accepted. Yost said, "he brought a lot to it. It's hard for someone to come in this late in the game and really just fit in, and he fit in perfectly."

== Reception ==
=== Viewers ===
In its original American broadcast, "Noblesse Oblige" was seen by an estimated 2.01 million household viewers and gained a 0.7 ratings share among adults aged 18–49, according to Nielsen Media Research. This means that 0.7 percent of all households with televisions watched the episode. This was a 17% increase in viewership from the previous episode, which was watched by 1.71 million viewers with a 0.5 in the 18-49 demographics.

=== Critical reviews ===
"Noblesse Oblige" received critical acclaim. Seth Amitin of IGN gave the episode an "amazing" 9.5 out of 10 and wrote in his verdict, "Justified has always had the pieces, but could never get them all together. But here we are now and it looks like everything is coming together - not just excellent characters, but gripping plot that stirs and changes with each episode. I'm really impressed. We're looking at what could be Justified's best season yet."

Alasdair Wilkins of The A.V. Club gave the episode an "A−" grade and wrote, "I say Boyd is in the middle, and tonight's 'Noblesse Oblige' offers a useful reminder of just how much further one can sink down the Harlan criminal hierarchy." Kevin Fitzpatrick of Screen Crush wrote, "Definitely not many specifics for the water-cooler, but consider 'Noblesse Oblige' another strong entry in an increasingly (and deservedly) confident season."

Alan Sepinwall of HitFix wrote, "Three very strong episodes in a row to start the season, and now we're caught up with what FX sent to critics in advance. I can't wait to see what happens next." Jeff Stone of IndieWire gave the episode a "B" grade and wrote, "I haven't even mentioned Raylan’s story yet, but that's because his plotline is pretty standard stuff this episode. The sad saga of Luther, his son Tyler, and Tyler’s no-good friend Earl is another nice example of Harlan as a lived-in world where people form connections over time. But the plot doesn’t have much meat to it and relies heavily on Earl and Tyler being almost piteously dumb."

Kyle Fowle of Entertainment Weekly wrote, "I for one loved the dinner table scene. Sam Elliott is sinister and seductive all at the same time, and Joelle Carter did some wonderful work as Ava, portraying through facial expressions a woman who's constantly evaluating her increasingly dangerous situation." Matt Zoller Seitz of Vulture gave the episode a perfect 5 star rating out of 5 and wrote, "If I had to make a list of the most consistently satisfying Justified episodes, 'Noblesse Oblige' would be on it. It's got everything fans want from the series, except for a certain quotient of fisticuffs or gunplay, but we don't really miss that because the threat of violence is so intense that by the end, you feel just as exhausted." Neely Tucker of The Washington Post wrote, "Avery Markham is the new dog in the Harlan porch, y'all, and he's a great big 'un."

James Queally of Los Angeles Times wrote, "'Noblesse Oblige' harps on the identity crises facing our three lead characters. But where it flutters around the edges of the questions facing Boyd, Ava's up-in-the-air loyalties are front and center." Sean McKenna of TV Fanatic gave the episode a 4 star rating out of 5 and wrote, "This wasn't a fast-paced hour, but it continued to tangle the web of motives and characters as the series heads towards its finale. And much like Rachel questioning Raylan’s decisions in their case against Boyd, I can only hope the show knows what it's doing." Jack McKinney of Paste gave the episode a 9 out of 10 and wrote, "While things took on a breezier pace this week, the overall quality is still quite strong. The creative team has assembled a murderer's row of 'that guy' character actors and turned them into an all-star ensemble. The big three leads are in top notch form. Three episodes in, and the last season is everything we could have hoped for and more."
