= Alive Day =

- Justified episode
- Episode no.: Season 6 Episode 6
- Directed by: Peter Werner
- Written by: Benjamin Cavell & Jennifer Kennedy
- Cinematography by: Attila Szalay
- Editing by: Keith Henderson
- Original air date: February 24, 2015
- Running time: 43 minutes

Guest appearances
- Mary Steenburgen as Katherine Hale; Garret Dillahunt as Ty Walker; Justin Welborn as Carl; Jeff Fahey as Zachariah Randolph; Scott Grimes as Seabass; Duke Davis Roberts as Choo-Choo Mundo; Chris Butler as Detective Butler; Robert Dolan as Detective Costanza; Ryan Dorsey as Earl; Shawn Parsons as The Pig; Mykelti Williamson as Ellstin Limehouse; Sam Elliott as Avery Markham

Episode chronology
← Previous "Sounding"	Next → "The Hunt"
- Justified (season 6)

"Alive Day" is the sixth episode of the sixth season of the American Neo-Western television series Justified. It is the 71st overall episode of the series and was written by co-executive producer Benjamin Cavell and Jennifer Kennedy and directed by Peter Werner. It originally aired on FX on February 24, 2015.

The series is based on Elmore Leonard's stories about the character Raylan Givens, particularly "Fire in the Hole", which serves as the basis for the episode. The series follows Raylan Givens, a tough deputy U.S. Marshal enforcing his own brand of justice. The series revolves around the inhabitants and culture in the Appalachian Mountains area of eastern Kentucky, specifically Harlan County where many of the main characters grew up. In the episode, Raylan and Tim continue investigating Walker and Avery's connection while Boyd, Zachariah and his crew continue working on the mine shaft.

According to Nielsen Media Research, the episode was seen by an estimated 1.81 million household viewers and gained a 0.5 ratings share among adults aged 18–49. The episode received mixed-to-positive reviews from critics, while critics praised closure to Choo-Choo's storyline, others expressed frustration at the episode's pace and "convoluted" writing, particularly with the character's decisions.

== Plot ==
Boyd (Walton Goggins) arrives at the house and finds Raylan (Timothy Olyphant), who claims that he is there to question him. Raylan wants to know about Dewey Crowe's disappearance, which Boyd seems to evade. Boyd nevertheless uses the conversation to point that Dewey may have gone to the Pizza Portal and Avery (Sam Elliott) may know anything. Frustrated by their recent kiss and her informant status, Ava (Joelle Carter) asks Raylan to leave, which he does.

Walker (Garret Dillahunt) meets with Seabass (Scott Grimes) and Choo-Choo (Duke Davis Roberts) to discuss their murder of Calhoun. He assigns them to dispose of the body and also threaten Calhoun's call girl Caprice, who saw them entering his office. The next day, Raylan and Tim (Jacob Pitts) are called to a crime scene by detectives, to find Calhoun's body. Due to the bear hunting season, authorities easily found his body, which had his wallet, Raylan's card, a clear impression of Choo-Choo's knuckles, footprints and tire tracks. Ava is visited by Zachariah (Jeff Fahey) at her house and is told by Boyd that Earl (Ryan Dorsey) will move into her house as a guest to protect her.

At a hotel room, Avery asks Katherine (Mary Steenburgen) to come clean about Grady's incarceration even as he proposes marriage, saying that he left Kentucky because he feared she would snitch on him next but has now made peace with it. Raylan and Tim later visit Avery at the Pizza Portal, questioning about his possible involvement on Calhoun's murder, something of which Avery was unaware. Choo-Choo arranges to meet Caprice with intentions of killing her, but she is so nice to him that he has second thoughts it. He later calls Walker to express he is conflicted and can't bring himself to kill her. Meanwhile, Boyd, Zachariah and the crew start working on the mine shaft.

Art (Nick Searcy) visits the office and asks Rachel (Erica Tazel), who worked on the Hale task force as her first assignment with the Marshals, but she is unaware of any snitch. Rachel suspects that Ava tried to run and Raylan brought her back, and they realize Rachel can demand answers to protect her career or leave things be for the sake of the investigation. Katherine and Duffy (Jere Burns) discuss the role of the snitch on Grady's fate at length, but resolve they'll have to kill Avery regardless.

At the shaft, Boyd crashes through a hole and is nearly killed, but is saved by Zachariah. The Pig (Shawn Parsons) later notices the boards were cut and expresses his concerns to Zachariah. While they look at it, Zachariah pushes him down the hole to his death. Walker takes two men (the Tigerhawk vault night shift) and meet with Choo-Choo in the woods to kill both Choo-Choo and Caprice if necessary, but they are followed by Raylan and Tim who expose Walker's duplicity. Nonetheless, Choo-Choo remains loyal and draws first, starting a shootout that allows Walker to escape with a leg wound while Choo-Choo drives away making it as far as a railroad crossing. As the train engineer checks on him, Choo-Choo has already died from his wounds.

Rachel issues an all-points bulletin on Walker, Seabass and Choo-Choo. That night, when Boyd returns home, Limehouse (Mykelti Williamson) calls him and wants to offer a warning for him: he ask if Boyd knows what Ava was doing the previous day. The episode ends as Boyd stares at Ava and Earl in the house.

== Production ==
=== Development ===
In January 2015, it was reported that the sixth episode of the sixth season would be titled "Alive Day", and was to be directed by Peter Werner and written by co-executive producer Benjamin Cavell and Jennifer Kennedy.

=== Writing ===
Critics saw similarities between the first scene of the episode and one of the climactic scenes in the first episode. Series developer Graham Yost said, "to have the three of them in a scene together doesn't happen that often. We originally talked about having an actual chicken dinner scene, and we went back and forth on it. Tim was bumping up against it: He wasn't really sure why Raylan would let it get that far, but he did see the point of Raylan wanting to make sure that Ava was OK, that Boyd hadn't found out anything about the Fekus quandary."

The writers wanted an "ironic" death for Choo-Choo, whose named was suggested by actor Timothy Olyphant, and they settled on having his character die by being hit by a train. However, plans changed due to the recent incident on Midnight Rider, in which due to criminal negligence by the producers of the film, second assistant camerawoman Sarah Jones was killed when she was struck by a CSX freight train that arrived on the trestle. Seven other crew members were also hurt, one seriously. Yost said, "there's just a real sensitivity across the business for any sort of train work. So we wanted to pay attention to that."

== Reception ==
=== Viewers ===
In its original American broadcast, "Alive Day" was seen by an estimated 1.81 million household viewers and gained a 0.5 ratings share among adults aged 18–49, according to Nielsen Media Research. This means that 0.5 percent of all households with televisions watched the episode. This was a 4% increase in viewership from the previous episode, which was watched by 1.73 million viewers with a 0.5 in the 18-49 demographics.

=== Critical reviews ===
"Alive Day" received mixed-to-positive reviews from critics. Seth Amitin of IGN gave the episode an "okay" 6.9 out of 10 and wrote in his verdict, "The train has officially stopped. What momentum was built in the first three episodes has died alongside Choo Choo and the final season for Justified continues to be a bumpy ride. There's plenty of room to rebuild now and it's looking like that's going to happen in the next seven episodes, as is Justified's constitution. The question is whether or not it'll be capitalized upon. I don't know the answer to that."

Alasdair Wilkins of The A.V. Club gave the episode a "B+" grade and wrote, "Bringing this all back to 'Alive Day', we find an episode that is fascinated with the true motivations of all its characters, and still more specifically how dangerous it can be to not know what others actually want." Kevin Fitzpatrick of Screen Crush wrote, "Perhaps not the most memorable of the season, though 'Alive Day' certainly served to make the major conflicts more personal than the grand weed-scheming of previous weeks would suggest, now that Boyd, Ava, Raylan, Rachel, Avery and Katherine all have reason to suspect one another of duplicity. The only item more troubling than Boyd's loss of trust for Ava perhaps, is the knowledge that both he and Raylan seem to have lost their edge of seeing the threats amassed around them."

Alan Sepinwall of HitFix wrote, "The rest of 'Alive Day' was pretty spiffy in its own right, with characters sizing each other up, trying to figure out whom to trust, and at times placing their trust where it absolutely does not belong." Jeff Stone of IndieWire gave the episode an "A−" grade and wrote, "It's both sad and kind of hilarious, and it was nice to see Justified put the spotlight on one of its more colorful supporting characters. RIP Choo-Choo: your name was so fun to type."

Kyle Fowle of Entertainment Weekly wrote, "Justified has always done a wonderful job of limiting the interactions between its two big dogs, Raylan Givens and Boyd Crowder. The lives of the two are constantly intertwined, but the show understands that their relationship is built upon tension and unpredictability. Scenes between Raylan and Boyd are actually few and far between, which adds significance to the scenes where they do come face-to-face." Matt Zoller Seitz of Vulture gave the episode a perfect 5 star rating out of 5 and wrote, "I'm going to miss the towering, slow-witted henchman with the literally killer punch. He died this week in the ironically titled 'Alive Day', which also happens to be the name of James Gandolfini's 2008 documentary about physically and emotionally wounded soldiers trying to adjust to life after combat."

James Queally of Los Angeles Times wrote, "I doubt 'Alive Day' will be my favorite episode of Justified's final season when all is said and done, but for now, this was an incredibly strong offering that sets things up nicely at the halfway point." Sean McKenna of TV Fanatic gave the episode a 4.7 star rating out of 5 and wrote, "This was such an engaging episode with plenty of drama, action and surprises. The dialogue remains top-notch as always, and every character from the big guns like Boyd and Raylan to the smaller ones like Choo Choo continue to stand out on their own." Jack McKinney of Paste gave the episode a 9.1 out of 10 and wrote, "The plotting of a television show is similar to a combination of punches in boxing. Both rely on carefully considered timing to achieve maximum effect, and there's no way to know in advance for sure which punches you will land and what hits will miss. In boxing, the best combinations include pauses that allow your opponent to drop their guard, not knowing that the biggest blow is yet to come. In hindsight, last week's lighter and more leisurely than usual episode seems very much like just such a pause. Without question, this week is the punch."
