= List of Justified characters =

This is a list of characters from the FX neo-Western television series Justified and its sequel series Justified: City Primeval.

== Overview ==
= Main cast (credited)
= Recurring cast (3+)
= Guest cast (1–2)

=== Main cast ===
Actor	Character	Justified						Justified: City Primeval
Actor	Character	1	2	3	4	5	6	Justified: City Primeval
Timothy Olyphant	Raylan Givens	Main	Main	Main	Main	Main	Main	Main
Nick Searcy	Art Mullen	Main	Main	Main	Main	Main	Main	
Jacob Pitts	Tim Gutterson	Main	Main	Main	Main	Main	Main	
Erica Tazel	Rachel Brooks	Main	Main	Main	Main	Main	Main	
Joelle Carter	Ava Crowder	Main	Main	Main	Main	Main	Main	
Natalie Zea	Winona Hawkins	Main	Main	Main	Recurring	Guest	Recurring	Special Guest
Walton Goggins	Boyd Crowder	Recurring	Main	Main	Main	Main	Main	Special Guest
Jere Burns	Wynn Duffy	Guest	Guest	Recurring	Recurring	Main	Main	
Aunjanue Ellis	Carolyn Wilder							Main
Vondie Curtis-Hall	Marcus "Sweety" Sweeton							Main
Adelaide Clemens	Sandy Stanton							Main
Marin Ireland	Maureen Downey							Main
Victor Williams	Wendell Robinson							Main
Norbert Leo Butz	Norbert Bryl							Main
Boyd Holbrook	Clement Mansell							Main

=== Recurring cast ===
Actor	Character	Justified						Justified: City Primeval
Actor	Character	1	2	3	4	5	6	Justified: City Primeval
Damon Herriman	Dewey Crowe	Recurring	Guest	Recurring		Recurring	Guest	
Linda Gehringer	Helen Givens	Recurring	Recurring	Guest				
Rick Gomez	David Vasquez	Recurring		Guest	Recurring	Recurring	Recurring	
Brent Sexton	Hunter Mosley	Recurring			Guest			
David Meunier	Johnny Crowder	Recurring	Recurring	Recurring	Recurring	Recurring		
Raymond J. Barry	Arlo Givens	Recurring	Recurring	Recurring	Recurring		Guest	
William Ragsdale	Gary Hawkins	Recurring	Recurring	Guest				
M. C. Gainey	Bo Crowder	Recurring	Guest					
Margo Martindale	Mags Bennett		Recurring					
Jeremy Davies	Dickie Bennett		Recurring	Recurring		Guest	Guest	
Kaitlyn Dever	Loretta McCready		Recurring	Guest		Guest	Recurring	
Brad William Henke	Coover Bennet		Recurring					
Joseph Lyle Taylor	Doyle Bennet		Recurring					
Peter Murnik	Tom Bergen		Recurring	Recurring				
William Gregory Lee	Nick Mooney		Recurring	Recurring	Recurring	Recurring		
Kevin Rankin	Derek "Devil" Lennox	Guest	Recurring	Recurring				
Neal McDonough	Robert Quarles			Recurring				
Jonathan Kowalsky	Mike Cosmatopolis		Guest	Recurring	Recurring	Recurring	Recurring	
Mykelti Williamson	Ellstin Limehouse			Recurring	Guest		Recurring	
Todd Stashwick	Ash Murphy			Recurring				
Demetrius Grosse	Errol			Recurring			Guest	
Jesse Luken	Jimmy Tolan			Recurring	Recurring	Recurring		
Brendan McCarthy	Tanner Dodd			Recurring				
Stephen Root	Mike Reardon	Guest	Guest	Recurring		Guest		
Abby Miller	Ellen May		Guest	Recurring	Recurring		Guest	
David Andrews	Tillman Napier			Recurring	Guest			
Jim Beaver	Shelby Parlow/Drew Thompson		Guest	Recurring	Recurring			
Jenn Lyon	Lindsey Salazar			Recurring	Recurring			
Patton Oswalt	Bob Sweeney				Recurring		Guest	
Ron Eldard	Colton Rhodes				Recurring			
Joe Mazzello	Billy St. Cyr				Recurring			
Brian Howe	Arnold				Recurring			
Lindsay Pulsipher	Cassie St. Cyr				Recurring			
Robert Baker	Randall Kusik				Recurring			
Mike O'Malley	Nick "Nicky" Augustine				Recurring			
Sam Anderson	Lee Paxton				Recurring	Recurring		
Mel Fair	Nelson Dunlop	Guest	Guest	Guest	Recurring	Recurring	Recurring	
John Kapelos	Ethan Picker				Recurring	Recurring		
Michael Rapaport	Darryl Crowe Jr.					Recurring		
James LeGros	Wade Messer		Guest	Guest		Recurring		
Edi Gathegi	Jean Baptiste					Recurring		
A. J. Buckley	Danny Crowe					Recurring		
Jacob Lofland	Kendal Crowe					Recurring		
Don McManus	Billy Geist					Recurring	Guest	
Alicia Witt	Wendy Crowe					Recurring		
Karolina Wydra	Mara Paxton					Recurring		
Justin Welborn	Carl					Recurring	Recurring	
Steve Harris	Roscoe					Recurring		
Wood Harris	Jay					Recurring		
Amy Smart	Alison Brander					Recurring		
Bill Tangradi	Cyrus Boone					Recurring	Guest	
Mickey Jones	Rodney "Hot Rod" Dunham		Guest	Guest		Recurring		
Danny Strong	Albert Fekus					Recurring	Guest	
Danielle Panabaker	Penny Cole					Recurring		
Mary Steenburgen	Katherine Hale					Recurring	Recurring	
Garret Dillahunt	Ty Walker						Recurring	
Ryan Dorsey	Earl						Recurring	
Scott Grimes	Sean/Seabass						Recurring	
Duke Davis Roberts	Mundo/Choo-Choo						Recurring	
Sam Elliott	Avery Markham						Recurring	
Jeff Fahey	Zachariah Randolph						Recurring	
Jonathan Tucker	Boon						Recurring	
Ravi Patel	Rick Newley							Recurring
Kenn E. Head	Lou Whitman							Recurring
Vivian Olyphant	Willa Givens							Recurring
Alexander Pobutsky	Skender Lulgjuraj							Recurring
Regina Taylor	Diane							Recurring
Joseph Anthony Byrd	Trennell							Recurring
Eddie Martinez	Hector							Recurring
Terry Kinney	Toma Costia							Recurring
Yosef Kasnetzkov	Besnik Darke							Recurring
Nick Druzbanski	Luka							Recurring

== Main characters ==
=== Raylan Givens ===
Deputy U.S. Marshal Raylan Givens (played by Timothy Olyphant) is a Deputy U.S. Marshal who is reassigned from his Miami office back to his hometown of Kentucky after gunning down a cartel hitman. His familiarity with the region and its criminal inhabitants, such as his father Arlo and his old friend Boyd Crowder, makes him the lead Marshal for all things Harlan County.

=== Art Mullen ===
Chief Deputy U.S. Marshal Art Mullen (played by Nick Searcy) is the Chief Deputy U.S. Marshal in charge of the Lexington Field Office and Raylan's direct superior. He has a deadpan sense of humor and tries to keep a handle on Raylan's more impulsive tactics.

=== Ava Crowder ===
Ava Crowder (played by Joelle Carter) was originally married to the abusive Bowman Crowder before she shot him with his deer rifle in the first episode. She has a romantic history with Raylan that defines their relationship.

In season 2 she allows Boyd to rent a room in her house with the requirement that he stay clear of illegal activities. After some time she comes to his aid and they begin a romantic relationship lasting for the rest of the series. She is shot by Dickie Bennett during the war between the Crowders and Bennetts.

=== Tim Gutterson ===
Deputy U.S. Marshal Tim Gutterson (played by Jacob Pitts) is a Deputy U.S. Marshal and former Army Ranger Sniper. He's known for his laconic attitude and talent for marksmanship. His military experience and skills with firearms often come in handy during hostage stand offs when a precision shot is needed to end it quickly and efficiently.

=== Rachel Brooks ===
Deputy U.S. Marshal Rachel Brooks (played by Erica Tazel) is a Deputy U.S. Marshal who initially comes into conflict with Raylan due to his perceived lack of professionalism, in contrast to her cool, level-headed approach.

=== Winona Hawkins ===
Winona Hawkins (played by Natalie Zea) is Raylan Givens' ex-wife. She first appears in season 1 as a court reporter working in the same government building as the Marshal's office. Her new husband, Gary Hawkins, is a real estate agent in Lexington. Gary gets involved with the Dixie Mafia, specifically Wynn Duffy, and their marriage sours. Winona and Raylan never got over each other after their divorce and as such start up a romantic relationship once Gary moves out.

In season 2 Winona steals $210,000 from the evidence locker in the Marshal's office but panics and asks Raylan for help in returning it. After the attempt on her life set up by Gary and executed by Wynn Duffy she leaves Raylan in hopes of a quiet life.

=== Boyd Crowder ===
Boyd Crowder (played by Walton Goggins) is a highly intelligent and charismatic career criminal who frequently comes into conflict with Raylan. Boyd and Raylan share a coal mining past which serves to connect the two more than they might admit, even as Boyd's criminal operations continue to draw him into trouble with Raylan and the Marshals.

In season 1 he is introduced as the leader of the neo-Nazi group Crowder's Commandos. After Raylan shoots him in the chest he claims to have found Jesus and when released from prison starts his own church for fellow ex-cons to restart life and fight to keep Harlan clean of drugs and crime. His new ideology brings him into conflict with his father Bo, who runs a protection racket and drugs through Harlan. This climaxes when Bo has Boyd beaten and his men killed after Boyd blew up a shipment of drugs from Miami meant for Bo. A now broken Boyd teams up with Raylan to stop Bo from killing Ava.

In season 2 he is back to working in a mine and living with Ava on the condition that he has no part in illegal activities. Fellow miners recruit him to help rob the coal company they work for, Black Pike, but Boyd is wise to their true intentions of killing him once they have the money. He switches the money and the explosives so the men blow themselves up and not him. With a taste for the outlaw life again he rounds up his old crew including Johnny, Devil, and now Arlo and Ava. They set out to take over the Harlan crime world from the Bennetts.

In season 3 he comes into conflict with Robert Quarles and the Detroit Mob who look to take over the Oxycontin business in Kentucky.

In season 4 Boyd continues his criminal relationship with Wynn Duffy which brings him into the world of the Detroit Mob when he is tasked with locating Drew Thompson for Nicky Augustine and Theo Tonin.

In season 5 he struggles to distribute heroin with Wynn Duffy and Ethan Picker while dealing with the criminal family of Dewey Crowe.

In season 6 he is recruited by Katherine Hale and Wynn Duffy to rob banks, specifically one where Avery Markham keeps a safe deposit box. Consumed by greed and the idea of finally leaving Harlan with Ava and $10,000,000 Boyd will stop at nothing to accomplish his goals. He partners with Ava's unstable uncle Zachariah Randolph in order to tunnel into Markham's vault, despite the fact that Zachariah wants to harm him due to Boyd's deceased brother Bowman beating Ava. Eventually Zachariah tries to blow Boyd up in the mine shaft but fails. Once Boyd gets his hands on Markham's cash he meets up with Ava ready to leave Kentucky but she shoots him in the shoulder and runs with the money. After escaping custody Boyd tracks down Ava ready to kill her but is caught and arrested by Raylan. Once back in prison he returns to his preaching ways from Season 1.

In City Primeval, after serving well over a decade in prison he escapes with help from a female guard to become a federal fugitive on the run.

=== Wynn Duffy ===
Wynn Duffy (played by Jere Burns) is a Dixie Mafia middleman known and feared for his bloodthirsty tactics. He is first seen as a loan shark for the Dixie Mafia extorting Gary Hawkins for borrowed money. He survives a shoot-out with Raylan and reappears in season 2, hired by Gary to assassinate Raylan and Winona. His attempt fails and he returns in season 3, still in the employ of Emmitt Arnett. When Robert Quarles, a higher-up in the Detroit Mob, kills Arnett he takes Duffy on as an increasingly reluctant right-hand man. Duffy is disturbed by Quarles' psychopathic tendencies and irritated by being delegated to remedial tasks (such as cleaning up the blood of Quarles' victims). He eventually betrays Quarles to Raylan and rises to a high-ranking position within the Dixie Mafia.

In season 4 he is tasked by Nicky Augustine with finding Drew Thompson, and employs both Boyd and Johnny Crowder to help him do so. When he is unsuccessful in keeping Thompson from being arrested and thus able to testify against Detroit Mob boss Theo Tonin, he flees Kentucky to avoid the wrath of Augustine. He returns after Augustine's death and enters a new, supposedly equal alliance with Boyd to move drugs through Harlan. In season 5 the Detroit Mob is dismantled under Sammy Tonin's ineffective leadership, and a three-way partnership between Duffy, Boyd and Ethan Picker is born to smuggle heroin out of Mexico. The trip proves disastrous and having lost money in the venture, Duffy brings in his old mentor Katherine Hale to help guide him. Together they make a deal with Boyd to abandon moving drugs and to focus on robbing banks.

In season 6, more of Duffy's background is revealed and we learn that he was responsible for snitching on Katherine's husband Grady, resulting in his death and also murdering AUSA Simon Poole to prevent Grady from learning he was the snitch. Duffy is reluctantly forced by Raylan and Art to become a CI against Boyd when they feel Boyd has talked Ava into compromising the case. Duffy's bodyguard, Mike Cosmatopolis (already appalled by his boss becoming a CI), learns that Duffy snitched on Grady and holds him hostage, planning to turn him over to Katherine, but this backfires when Mike refuses to allow Katherine to kill him, resulting in a brutal fight that results in Katherine's trachea being crushed and Mike shot five times throughout his body. After this, Duffy is relieved of being a CI and sees a woman about a new identity as well as a dog-grooming van. In the series finale, it is implied that Duffy is the one responsible for helping Ava escape unnoticed from Harlan in exchange for the remaining $9 million of Markham's cash and Raylan reveals that Duffy has since vanished off the face of the Earth and is rumored to be somewhere in Fiji.

=== Carolyn Wilder ===
Carolyn Wilder (played by Aunjanue Ellis)

=== Sweety ===
Marcus "Sweety" Sweeton (played by Vondie Curtis-Hall)

=== Sandy Stanton ===
Sandy Stanton (played by Adelaide Clemens)

=== Maureen Downey ===
'Maureen Downey (played by Marin Ireland)

=== Wendell Robinson ===
Wendell Robinson (played by Victor Williams)

=== Norbert Bryl ===
Norbert Bryl (played by Norbert Leo Butz

=== Clement Mansell ===
Clement Mansell (played by Boyd Holbrook)

== Supporting characters ==
=== Givens family and associates ===
==== Arlo Givens ====
Arlo Givens (played by Raymond J. Barry) is Raylan Givens' father and a veteran of the Vietnam War. An opportunistic criminal, he is deeply involved with Harlan's criminal underworld which often brings him into conflict with his son. In season 2 he joins Boyd Crowder's newly established criminal empire and helps to hold up Dickie Bennett, but his limp gives away his identity and Dickie retaliates by killing Helen. Following Helen's death, Arlo grows increasingly unstable and he ceases taking medication for his PTSD and bipolar disorder. In season 3, he kills Tom Bergen after mistaking him for Raylan and is arrested. Considering Boyd to be more of a son than Raylan, he takes the fall for Boyd's murder of Derek "Devil" Lennox and is incarcerated. It is revealed that he is one of few people who know the true identity of a criminal in hiding, Drew Thompson, and Hunter Mosley stabs him in prison to prevent him from revealing what he knows. While dying in a prison hospital bed, Raylan visits him only for his father's last words to be, "Kiss my ass". Arlo dies from his injury soon after.

==== Helen Givens ====
Helen Givens (played by Linda Gehringer) is Arlo's wife and sister to Raylan's mother Frances, who married Arlo after Frances died. She and Mags Bennett brokered the truce between their two families that lasted for 21 years after Raylan crippled Dickie in a high school baseball game. She is killed by Dickie Bennett after Arlo is made during Boyd's robbery of the Bennett weed shed.

=== Crowder family and associates ===
==== Bo Crowder ====
Bo Crowder (played by M. C. Gainey) is the patriarch of the Crowder family, incarcerated at the beginning of the series but later released due to Raylan's exposure of the original arresting officer Hunter Mosley. Upon his release from prison he sets off with two things in mind: get back into running drugs and torment Ava for the murder of his son. Bo partners with the Miami cartel to make and distribute meth in Harlan. When Boyd destroys the shipment from Miami he has Boyd beaten and his men killed. In order to make things right with the cartel Bo kidnaps Ava to force Raylan into meeting him; Bo intends to hand Raylan over to the cartel but is killed by a cartel sniper outside his cabin in Bulletville.

==== Johnny Crowder ====
Johnny Crowder (played by David Meunier) is Boyd's power-hungry cousin. He is severely crippled at the end of Season 1 after Bo shoots him in the gut for betraying him. He returns in season 2, reluctantly working for Boyd as he blames him for his being shot by Bo. This underlying hatred for Boyd grows as the show progresses until he eventually turns on Boyd, first selling him out to Wynn Duffy then finally moving against Boyd himself by robbing his heroin shipments. The rivalry climaxes in season 5 when he unsuccessfully tries to out bid Boyd in a deal with a Mexican cartel. He is shot and killed in a Mexican desert by Boyd.

==== Devil ====
Derek "Devil" Lennox (played by Kevin Rankin) is a henchman of Boyd and a neo-Nazi. One of the original members of Crowder's Commandos he continues working for Boyd after Boyd dismantles the neo-Nazi group. He grows disenchanted with the new Boyd, believing him to be too soft and ineffective as a leader. In season 3 he is convinced by Quarles to turn on Boyd and take over his operation. He recruits Johnny to help kill Boyd but is betrayed by Johnny and Boyd kills him for the mutiny.

==== Colt Rhodes ====
Colton "Colt" Rhodes (played by Ron Eldard) is an old army friend of Boyd's who comes to Kentucky to join his criminal empire in season 4. Having been demoted and discharged from the Army he develops a heroin addiction that compromises his effectiveness as one of Boyd's enforcers. His addiction grows into a serious problem for Boyd as he continues to make mistakes in his dealings going, so far as to accidentally let go someone who he was supposed to murder. His military background brings him into contact with Deputy Gutterson who also served in Iraq. The two very nearly come to shooting each other several times until finally Tim kills him as Colt drew down on him.

==== Dewey Crowe ====
Dewey Crowe (played by Damon Herriman) is a dimwitted criminal and gator poacher from South Florida who first appears in season 1 as a member of Crowder's Commandos. His dim wits often land him in darkly funny situations with law enforcement and his criminal partners. After he is arrested for impersonating a federal officer during a robbery of fellow criminals he befriends Dickie Bennett in prison. The two of them are broken out by corrupt guards trying to get a hold of Dickie's inheritance, some $3,000,000. When things go awry for the guards they drug Dewey and inform him they took his kidneys but will sell them back to him for $20,000. He then goes on a violent crime spree desperately trying to come up with the cash to save his life until it is revealed that his kidneys were never in fact taken. After spending some time in jail he is released when the courts release Dickie for his abduction by the corrupt guards. Dewey is also awarded a large settlement for his troubles which draws the attention of his family back in Florida. After somehow escaping trouble with the law on numerous occasions Dewey seeks out Boyd Crowder for work but instead Boyd kills him as he does not know if he can trust Dewey after all his seemingly lucky run-ins with law enforcement.

==== Rodney "Hot Rod" Dunham ====
Rodney "Hot Rod" Dunham (played by Mickey Jones) is a drug distributor from Memphis. He comes to Harlan on occasion to buy large quantities of marijuana and other drugs at first from the Bennetts and later the Crowders. His past dealings with both Mags and Bo lead him to trust and respect their offspring even when it is not in his best interest. In season 5 he partners with Johnny Crowder to rob Boyd's heroin shipments, though he does not know it is Boyd they are robbing. When he finds out the deception he agrees to hand Johnny over to Boyd but Johnny has already turned his men against him. He is wounded in a shootout with his former henchmen just before Raylan and a DEA agent arrive. As he bleeds out he reveals that he was in fact a confidential informant for the DEA all along.

==== Ellen May ====
Ellen May (played by Abby Miller) is a prostitute working at Audry's, a whorehouse in Harlan. Her boss, Delroy, forces her and several other hookers to rob a bank for oxy. When the robbery ends badly he chooses to cut his losses and kills all of them but her as she escapes. Ellen May seeks refuge at Johnny's bar with Ava who takes her in. While she rests, Ava calls Delroy to broker a deal for Ellen May's return. When Delroy comes up with the cash, Ava kills him in front of Ellen May. Boyd and Ava then take over Audry's and continue to employ her there. When a new church pops up in season 4 and starts converting locals from drugs and women to the holy scripture, Ellen May follows suit, renouncing her former life. Concerned about the illicit information Ellen May might divulge to the new preachers, Boyd orders Colt to kill her. Ellen May manages to escape and is rescued by Sheriff Shelby Parlow. Although she never once tries to expose the criminal activity she witnessed at the hands of Boyd or Ava, they still pursue her, going so far as to try to buy her from Ellstin Limehouse. When the Marshals capture Drew Thompson she too is brought in and given a new life in witness protection.

In the series finale, she is one of three people mentioned on a list of suspects (along with Limehouse and Duffy) that Raylan and the Marshals believe helped Ava escape unnoticed out of Harlan but was accounted for that day by her WitSec Marshal.

==== Jimmy Tolan ====
Jimmy Tolan (played by Jesse Luken) is a member of Boyd's gang, recruited in season 3 when Boyd and Johnny reclaim their bar and headquarters. He is described by Johnny as being unpredictable and crazy. Even though Johnny leaves the gang after the fourth season, Jimmy remains a loyal member. When Boyd goes up against the snake handling preacher Billy and his sister in season 4, Jimmy and Colt visit the church during the night to scare the preacher. Instead they are met with a dark room filled with rattlesnakes where Jimmy is bit several times. Upon receiving medical treatment for his snake bites it is revealed that the church milks their snakes of their venom to ensure the preacher isn't in any danger handling them. In the Season 5 finale "Restitution", he is held hostage by members of the Mexican cartel after Boyd breaks their agreement about not killing anyone in Mexico. When Boyd returns to the bar the cartel executes Jimmy in front of him.

==== Carl Lennon ====
Carl Lennon (played by Justin Welborn) is a newly recruited member of Boyd's gang, introduced in season 5, as well as the older brother of Earl. In season 6, Carl and Earl are arrested by the police after trailing a decoy bank van used by the Marshals in hopes of catching Boyd and Markham visits them in the jail, threatening to have Boon kill Earl if Carl doesn't go to the hospital and find out where his money is from Boyd and promptly execute him soon after. Carl, however, does not go through with the plan despite being angry at his boss for betraying his trust. Boyd remarks that he will need to create chaos in order to slip out unnoticed from the hospital, shooting Carl in the chest and donning the uniform of a deputy that Carl pistol-whipped into unconsciousness.

==== Earl Lennon ====
Earl Lennon (played by Ryan Dorsey) is a newly recruited member of Boyd's gang in season 6 and the younger brother of Carl. He is eager to impress Boyd and Ava, doing everything the ask without question. He and his brother are arrested after Boyd sends them to stake out Markham's headquarters when he is supposed to be moving his cash. While in jail, Markham buys the cops and frees Carl to go after Boyd, if he fails then Markham will kill Earl. Raylan intercepts Earl and the dirty cops and takes him into custody, gaining valuable information about the whereabouts of Boyd and Markham.

==== Zachariah Randolph ====
Zachariah Randolph (played by Jeff Fahey) is Ava's uncle and an expert on coal mining and dynamite. He has a strong hatred for the Crowders after Bowmen Crowder beat and abused Ava during their marriage. He first appears in season 6 when Boyd recruits him to help tunnel into Avery Markham's vault. His hatred for Boyd leads him to try and kill him on several occasions in a mine shaft, first by cutting away floor boards for Boyd to fall down and second by tying Boyd to a support beam and setting off several pounds of dynamite above him. Boyd manages to escape and confronts Ava about her uncles betrayal. Zachariah helps Ava run with the stolen $10,000,000 after she shot Boyd. He elects to stay behind at an abandoned cabin in the mountains and wait for Boyd to show up. Boyd gets the drop on him and shoots him in the leg but before Boyd can get any information from him Zachariah blows himself up with dynamite in one last attempt to kill Boyd.

=== Bennett family and associates ===
==== Mags Bennett ====
Mags Bennett (played by Margo Martindale) is the matriarch of the Bennett crime family, which has a long-standing feud with the Givens family. She appears to be a harmless and affable figure despite her marijuana operation, but is in reality a cunning and ruthless criminal. She is introduced as an old friend of Raylan's and the proprietor of a small general store in Harlan. When she learns that Walt McCready, Loretta's father, went outside the hollar for help she poisons him and takes Loretta in as her own. Mags butts heads with both Raylan and Boyd as the latter looks to expand his criminal empire. She later comes into conflict with Black Pike Coal, a mining company looking to buy up land from the locals. Mags is most concerned with the future of her family, specifically her son Doyle's kids and their well being.

==== Dickie Bennett ====
Dickie Bennett (played by Jeremy Davies) is the middle child of the Bennett family. He has a long-standing rivalry with Raylan, who crippled him during a high school baseball game. Eccentric and emotionally stunted, he makes frequent attempts to increase his power base only to fail each time. After Mags dissolves her empire leaving him only the weed business, he takes matters into his own hands and calls off Mags's deal with Boyd. To send a message Boyd robs Dickie's weed house but Dickie makes Arlo. Determined to get his money and weed back, Dickie goes to Arlo's but ends up killing his wife Helen instead. During the ensuing war between the Crowders and his family, he shoots and wounds Ava. After that he goes into hiding as Boyd wants him dead for shooting Ava and Raylan wants him in prison for murdering his aunt. Mags and Doyle eventually decide he is too much of a liability and hand him over to Raylan, who arrests him. When he is released due to a fellow criminal recanting his statement, Dickie goes on the offensive. He traps Raylan and strings him from a tree, beating him with a baseball bat as retribution for Raylan crippling him with a bat in high school. Boyd shows up intending to kill Dickie but is convinced to let Raylan have him when he heads back to Mags's house. At the end of Season 2 he ends up in prison.

In season 3 it is revealed that his deceased mother had left roughly $3,000,000 with a local banker and criminal, Elstin Limehouse, who is under obligation to release the money only to Dickie. Corrupt prison guards overhear this and break him out in order for him to take them to the money. When Dickie meets with Limehouse, he is given a cooler filled with what Limeshouse claims is left of his mother's money, receipts and roughly $46,000. Knowing that Limehouse is holding out on him, Dickie refuses to accept the cooler of cash and insists that Limehouse return to him all that he is owed. In an attempt to get his money he reluctantly enlists the help of Boyd Crowder to rob Limehouse. When it is revealed that Limehouse had stashed the money with Loretta, Dickie breaks into her home but finds Raylan waiting for him as Limehouse tipped him off. Raylan shoots and wounds Dickie before taking him back to prison. Dickie is the last surviving member of the Bennett clan.

In season 6 it is revealed that Dickie unknowingly sold his family land to Loretta McCready in one last attempt to feud with Raylan.

==== Coover Bennett ====
Coover Bennett (played by Brad William Henke) is the youngest Bennett child. He is unintelligent and used mostly as muscle for Dickie. After Mags kills Loretta's father he steals his wrist watch as a trophy. Coover grows jealous of Mags' new affection for Loretta and hates her for it. Loretta notices him wearing the watch at Mags' party and sneaks him a blunt soaked in formaldehyde to knock him out so she can check the back of the watch for her fathers inscription. Coover wakes up and kidnaps her despite Dickie's protests. He plans to take her to see her dead daddy before throwing her down the same mine shaft. Raylan arrives shortly after receiving a call from Loretta and after a brief struggle manages to shoot Coover in the neck causing him to fall to his death at the bottom of the mine shaft.

==== Doyle Bennett ====
Doyle Bennett (played by Joseph Lyle Taylor) is the oldest and most competent of the Bennett children. He is the corrupt Chief of Police in Bennett Hollow, a role which he uses to aid his mother's criminal ambitions. He is often seen as the future of the Bennett family since he has a family and has a real job in the police force unlike his brothers. Doyle often uses his police authority to protect and cover up for his younger brothers' criminal activity. The most level headed brother he often has to talk Dickie and Coover out of doing something stupid or dangerous to the family's future. After Mags closes on the Black Pike deal it is revealed that Doyle and his kids will be the main beneficiaries of the payout, not Dickie or Coover. When Loretta returns to Harlan seeking revenge for her father's murder, Doyle is present at Mags' house. In the ensuing confusion Raylan takes a bullet in his side and Doyle approaches gun drawn, before he can kill Raylan though, a sniper shoots him in the forehead killing him.

==== Jed Berwind ====
Jed Berwind (played by Richard Speight Jr.) is a long-time associate of the Bennett family who is offered a position as Dickie's partner in the marijuana business once Mags steps down, which he accepts to support his family. Dickie, Jed and two other henchmen are robbed of their marijuana by Boyd Crowder, Devil and Arlo Givens during a business transaction with Rodney "Hot Rod" Dunham but Jed remains loyal to Dickie while the two other henchmen are promptly executed by Dickie when they refuse to keep working for him after the robbery. Helen Givens shoots and wounds Jed after he and Dickie break into her home looking for Arlo. Doyle attempts to execute Jed to help cover his brother's tracks after Helen's murder, but this plan is foiled by Raylan, who intervenes before Doyle can kill him. Jed agrees to testify against Dickie as long as his family is kept safe, but recants his testimony after Mags calls in a debt with his grandmother. Jed takes the fall for Helen's murder and Dickie walks free. In season 3, Jed returns as Raylan needs someone to testify against Dickie so that he is back in prison, and wants him to change his statement back to the one he had previously recanted. Jed only agrees to do so if Raylan can get his grandmother to talk to him, but Raylan finds that his grandmother is in a nursing home, unable to speak due to a stroke and can only communicate by pointing at letters and pictures in a book and the woman is less than cooperative, requesting two milkshakes and dumping one of them in Raylan's lap.

=== Detroit Mob ===
==== Theo Tonin ====
Theo Tonin (played by Adam Arkin) is the head of the Detroit Mob, father of Sammy Tonin and adoptive father of Robert Quarles. He is a ruthless crime boss said to carry around a human ear in his pocket which he speaks to when he wants someones full attention. He was robbed and shot by Drew Thompson before the series begins and thus wants him found and brought before him to be tortured and killed. After Drew's arrest he goes into hiding overseas as Drew's testimony could put him away for a long time. He returns to the US in season 5 seeking medical treatment but is captured by Raylan and Art.

==== Sammy Tonin ====
Sammy Tonin (played by Max Perlich) is the son of Theo Tonin and heir to the Tonin Empire, although he is largely considered to be weak, ineffectual and cowardly by his subordinates. After Drew Thompson is arrested by the Marshals Theo flees the country and Sammy takes over the Detroit Mob but proves an incompetent leader and soon loses control. He soon ends up owing a Canadian mob large amounts of money for heroin shipments but fails to pay it back. When Boyd and Duffy visit Detroit to find their own heroin Picker executes Sammy in front of them saving himself and appeasing the Canadians.

==== Robert Quarles ====
Robert Quarles (played by Neal McDonough) is the adopted son of Theo Tonin, who comes to Harlan with ambitious plans to expand Detroit's drug empire. His preferred weapon is a subcompact pistol chambered in .32 ACP which he mounts on a rail to his left forearm; it is revealed he got the idea for it after being forced to watch Taxi Driver as a child. Quarles is a troubled man, revealed to have been heavily abused and sold by his father into the sex trade at a very young age to support his father's addictions. He was rescued by Theo Tonin and allowed to kill his father at age 14. This leaves him with lasting scars and psychological problems causing him to abduct and abuse other young men, much to the displeasure of Theo and fellow Detroit Mob members such as Wynn Duffy. As he works to expand his reach in Kentucky he crosses paths with both Boyd Crowder and Ellstin Limehouse. After suffering numerous defeats at the hand of Boyd and indebting himself to Limehouse he has lost all good faith with Theo and Detroit. He is cut off from Detroit and a hit squad is sent after him. After Quarles manages to avoid them and offers to buy his way back home, Theo demands $500,000 for the clean slate. To get the cash Quarles kidnaps a family and extorts Raylan to get him to Limehouse who has enough money to get Quarles home. While collecting the money one of Ellstin's henchmen shoots Quarles in the gut and Limehouse chops off his left arm with a meat cleaver. While he lies on the ground bleeding profusely he reveals to Raylan that it was in fact Arlo who shot and killed Tom Bergen. Whether or not he survives is never fully addressed though in season 4 Limehouse mentions the last time men from Detroit came to Nobles a man lost his arm.

==== Nicky Augustine ====
Nicky Augustine (played by Mike O'Malley) is a high-ranking member of the Detroit Mob tasked with finding Drew Thompson. Nicky is revealed to have several men inside the FBI under his employment, including lifelong friend Special Agent Barkley. He travels to Lexington to find Drew Thompson after the Marshals start digging into the 30-year-old case of Thompson's alleged death. Upon learning that the FBI has lost control of the investigation to the Marshals, Nicky shoots Barkley in the head and tasks Wynn Duffy with locating Thompson. After Duffy gives him two possible names for Thompson, Nicky sends a hitman out to confirm their identities before killing them. It is later revealed the names given to Duffy from Boyd were in fact Boyd's enemies and not necessarily Thompson. Nicky travels to Harlan seeking to kill Boyd for the misinformation but ends up hiring him to locate Thompson as Boyd knows the area better than anyone from Detroit. Boyd and the Marshals find out Thompson's new identity at nearly identical times but the Marshals reach him first. Nicky abducts Winona and threatens to kill her and her unborn baby if Raylan does not turn over Thompson. Nicky meets with Raylan briefly in his limo in an attempt by Raylan to talk him down. Nicky is unaware that Raylan reached out to Sammy Tonin, whom Nicky intends to murder, and warned him of Nicky's betrayal. Sammy flies to Kentucky and orders Nicky's execution via firing squad.

==== Ethan Picker ====
Ethan Picker (played by John Kapelos) is a Detroit Mob enforcer and subordinate to Sammy Tonin and Nicky Augustine. He comes to Harlan with Nicky to hunt down and retrieve Drew Thompson for Theo Tonin. He eventually partners with Wynn Duffy and Boyd Crowder to distribute Canadian and then Mexican heroin throughout Kentucky. After numerous failed shipments and hijackings, he calls for Duffy to kill Boyd, blaming him for their troubles, and for them to move on with their criminal enterprises. Duffy sets up a meeting with Katherine Hale, Boyd and Picker to weigh the pros and cons of a continued partnership with either men. During a follow-up meeting, Boyd offers Picker a cigarette and tosses him the pack, which explodes in Picker's lap, killing him. Boyd then announces to the stunned Katherine and Duffy that the pack contained two ounces of a plastic explosive on a 10-second timer.

=== Crowe family and associates ===
==== Darryl Crowe Jr. ====
Darryl Crowe Jr. (played by Michael Rapaport) is the oldest sibling and leader of the Crowe crime family from South Florida. He first appears in season 5 when his cousin Dewey Crowe receives a large settlement from the state of Kentucky. Darryl moves his family to Harlan to take advantage of their dimwitted cousin and set down roots in a new area as there is nothing left for the Crowe family in Florida.

==== Wendy Crowe ====
Wendy Crowe (played by Alicia Witt) is a member of the Crowe family based in Florida where she works as a paralegal in order to defend her brothers. She is seen as the most competent and book-smart member of the family. She is the only female sibling and is revealed to be the mother of Kendal, who is presented as her younger brother for the first couple of episodes. In the season finale, Wendy (on behalf of the Marshals) manages to talk Darryl into confessing that he was the one who shot Art Mullen and recording it on her cell phone. When Darryl threatens her into giving him the phone, Wendy shoots him once in the groin and the side of neck as Raylan watches and leans over Darryl's dying body and taunts him.

==== Kendal Crowe ====
Kendal Crowe (played by Jacob Lofland) is the youngest member of the Crowe family. He is initially presented as the youngest brother but is in fact Wendy's son. Young and inexperienced at crime he is often shocked and horrified by the violence committed by his uncles. He admits to shooting Art Mullen in what he calls an accident but Raylan is convinced Darryl put him up to the confession.

==== Danny Crowe ====
Danny Crowe (played by A. J. Buckley) is the hot tempered younger brother of Darryl Crowe Jr. He first appears in season 5 as a member of the Crowe family in South Florida before moving to Harlan after their cousin Dewey Crowe receives a large settlement from the state of Kentucky. His short temper and love of knives leads him to challenge most adversaries to proves themselves with the "21 foot rule" where a knife is said to beat a holstered gun within 21 feet. When burying his dog he challenges Raylan to the 21 foot rule. Danny charges Raylan with his knife out but falls into the grave dug for his pet and stabs himself in the throat. As Danny dies Raylan remarks that he didn't see the hole either or he would have told him.

==== Jean "The Haitian" Baptiste ====
Jean "The Haitian" Baptiste (played by Edi Gathegi) is a Haitian gator farmer who works for the Crowes disposing of bodies. He is cold and calculating oftentimes antagonizing Danny Crowe for his laziness and short temper. He accompanies the Crowes to Harlan after learning that their cousin Dewey Crowe received a large settlement from the state of Kentucky. He tempts Danny Crowe into proving his fabled 21 foot rule (where a knife is supposedly able to beat a holstered gun from 21 feet). When Baptiste backs up to 21 feet Danny instead draws a shotgun and kills him.

=== Markham and associates ===
==== Avery Markham ====
Avery Markham (played by Sam Elliott) is a criminal and entrepreneur who made his fortune in the legal weed business in Colorado. He returns to Kentucky in season 6 looking to buy up land in Harlan to grow weed, expecting the state to change its marijuana laws soon. However, Markham strong-arms the land from the owners, killing them once they refuse a second offer. He employs a team of mercenaries made up mostly of retired military, including Ty Walker, Seabass, and Choo Choo. Also in his employ is a sort of hipster quick draw artist, Boon. He quickly gains a rivalry with Boyd Crowder, who is attempting to rob him of $10,000,000 and also stifles Markham's plans to acquire properties through his own threats against the land owners. When Boyd kidnaps Markham's fiancée, Katherine Hale, he is forced to hand over the $10 million for her life. After the exchange Boyd reveals to Markham that it was Katherine's idea to rob him. In his search for Boyd and the money Markham captures Ava, and Boyd arrives with a hostage of his own, one of Markham's bought cops. In the ensuing shootout Avery is shot and killed by Boyd with the final shot going through his left eye.

==== Katherine Hale ====
Katherine Hale (played by Mary Steenburgen) is the widow of Grady Hale and Markham's lover. She first appears in season 5 as an old friend and mentor figure to Wynn Duffy. She convinces Duffy to bring Boyd on to help them rob banks, specifically one where Markham stores his fortune as she blames him for her late husband's incarceration and death. It is revealed that she was the one really in charge when her husband was alive, as such she was a mentor figure to Wynn Duffy. When she learns it was Duffy who ratted on her late husband she attempts to kill him but Mikey, Duffy's bodyguard, intervenes and a frantic struggle ensues which leaves both of them dead and Duffy alive.

==== Ty Walker ====
Ty Walker (played by Garret Dillahunt) is Markham's right-hand man and the leader of a mercenary group with a military background. He is a soft-spoken yet strong willed enforcer who can take offense easy. He comes to Harlan with Markham to assist in his plan to buy up large plots of land to grow legal weed. He is a skilled killer but not as adept at crime. He takes a bullet in a shootout with Raylan and Tim but escapes. After Markham burns him for his failings he finds his way over to Ava's house in order to team with them in their attempt to rob Markham. As he knows the combination to Markham's safe, Boyd reluctantly accepts his offer, but before they can put their plan into action Raylan shows up with the news that Markham has offered a $100,000 reward for his capture. Knowing that going anywhere with Walker is now impossible Boyd gives him up. Walker overhears the betrayal and knocks Earl out before running away, Raylan spots him and the two engage in a brief shoot out which ends when Raylan shoots Walker in the back as he ran. As Walker dies he curses Raylan for shooting him in the back to which he replies "If you wanted to get hit in the front you shoulda run towards me".

==== Boon ====
Boon (played by Jonathan Tucker) is a quick draw artist with strong psychopathic tendencies employed by Markham after the mercenary crew fails. He first appears at Lorretta's house to intimidate her into selling her property. He becomes infatuated with her and dotes on her, much to her disgust. He carries a Ruger Vaquero, a stainless steel revolver chambered in .45 LC. He sees himself as so similar to Raylan that he often compares himself to Raylan and their abilities with handguns. His desire to prove himself the better shootist leads him to challenge Raylan on several occasions but is always called back by Markham. In the series finale he runs Raylan's car off the road in order to challenge him one last time. In the ensuing shootout he aims for Raylan's head while Raylan aims for the heart. Boon is mortally wounded while his shot only grazes Raylan's temple—giving the impression that Raylan's bullet impacted Boon just as he fired, knocking Boon's bullet slightly off line.

==== Choo Choo ====
Choo Choo (played by Duke Davis Roberts) is a veteran left with a diminished mental capacity after being wounded in battle. He is called Choo Choo due to his size and punching strength as he "hits like a train". He is wounded in a shootout between the Marshals and mercenaries, and is able to escape but dies in his car stopped on train tracks just before it is to be hit by an oncoming train.

==== Seabass ====
Seabass (played by Scott Grimes) is one of Markham's military henchmen and served under Walker. He is deeply loyal to his former CO going so far as to try and extort money from Markham after he found out Markham paid $100,000 to whoever captured the recently 'burned' Walker. His attempt to rob Markham ends badly when Katherine Hale shoots him dead in her hotel room.

=== Law Enforcement ===
==== Dan Grant ====
Dan Grant (played by Matt Craven) is the former Chief Deputy of the Miami division. Grant reassigns Raylan Givens to Kentucky after Raylan shoots Tommy Bucks in broad daylight in a hotel restaurant in front of other guests staying there. Grant returns in the Season 2 premiere "The Moonshine War" and threatens to kill the head of the Miami cartel, Gio Reyes, if he makes any more attempts on Raylan's life and even offers Raylan his old position back, which he declines. Raylan later calls him in "Full Commitment" after he and Winona are attacked by two hitmen that Wynn Duffy hired on behalf of Gary Hawkins when the latter became increasingly jealous over the blooming relationship between Winona and Raylan.

In season 5, Raylan partners up with Dan and the Miami Marshals in an investigation regarding the Crowe family and a known associate named Elvis Machado. At some point after Season 5, it is likely Dan retired from the Marshals Service as Greg Sutter is seen in the Chief Deputy position in the series finale.

==== David Vasquez ====
Assistant U.S. Attorney David Vasquez (played by Rick Gomez) is an AUSA who originally arrives in Lexington to investigate Raylan's shootings and also informs Raylan that his sexual relationship with Ava has compromised a case against Boyd and he is being released from prison. Vasquez continues to assist the U.S. Marshals in various cases and in season 6, along with Tim Gutterson, Rachel Brooks and Raylan Givens, helps to build a RICO case against Boyd with Ava as the C.I. However, Vasquez becomes increasingly frustrated with the case as Ava will not give them any incriminating evidence of Boyd's criminal activity and when he believes Raylan and Ava conspired to steal $10 million together right under the Marshals noses. He is last seen in the series giving all of Wynn Duffy's belongings back as he is no longer a C.I. and issuing a BOLO on the missing Raylan.

==== Hunter Mosley ====
Sheriff Hunter Mosley (played by Brent Sexton) is the corrupt Sheriff in Harlan County. In season 1 it is revealed that he is on the Miami cartel's payroll as he attempts to kill and or capture Raylan for them. Raylan gets the upper hand and arrests him, and he spends the rest of the series behind bars. He, along with Arlo Givens and Josiah Carin, are the only people alive who know the true identity of fugitive Drew Thompson. When Raylan offers him the same deal he offered Arlo in exchange for Thompson's identity, Mosley shivs Arlo in prison to prevent him from talking. In the aftermath of Arlo's death Mosley is transferred to supermax but instead of going by prison bus Raylan takes charge of him. Raylan intends to force the real identity of Thompson out of Hunter but he repeatedly attempts suicide instead of talking. He is last seen telling Raylan that no matter what he thinks of himself Raylan will always be Arlo's son.

==== Mike Reardon ====
Judge Mike "The Hammer" Reardon (played by Stephen Root) is judge in the same government building as the Marshal's office. Known for his heavy handed approach to sentencing criminals he is feared and hated by many. This causes him to come under threat several times, once by a newly released convict he sentenced and again by a family involved in a case he is presiding over. It is rumored he wears a speedo and revolver under his robes in court. Reardon is last seen in season 5 as he, Raylan Givens and David Vasquez conspire to have Kendall Crowe tried as an adult for the attempted shooting of Art Mullen in order to get Kendall's uncle, Darryl Crowe Jr., to confess to being the real shooter.

==== Shelby Parlow ====
Sheriff Shelby Parlow (played by Jim Beaver) originally worked for Black Pike Coal at the same time as Boyd Crowder in season 2. He is fired after an attempted robbery goes wrong and becomes a greeter at a big box store. In season 3 he becomes Boyd's man for Sheriff in a race to depose current Sheriff Napier, eventually winning due to Boyd's dirty tactics. He initially does what Boyd asks of him while in office but eventually distances himself from the local criminal kingpin in order to serve as a truly honest cop in such a corrupt town, going so far as to secretly harbor a prostitute, Ellen May, whom Boyd intended to kill. In season 4, it is revealed that Shelby is notorious fugitive Drew Thompson, who fled after shooting Theo Tonin in the eye in Panama and stealing $2 million worth of cocaine. He becomes the focal point of the season as several criminal organizations and the U.S. Marshals set out to find him.

==== Tom Bergen ====
State Trooper Tom Bergen (played by Peter Murnik) is a Kentucky State Police officer stationed in Harlan for the past 18 years. He first appears helping Raylan and Rachel track down a known pedophile, Jimmy Earl Dean. He then assists Raylan in several instances when Raylan needs to work on cases in Harlan, specifically with the Bennett family. In season 3 he is the first officer on the scene of a car bombing outside Johnny's bar. The blast was meant to kill Quarles but only wounds him, when Bergen orders Quarles to drop his weapon he is shot off screen leading all to believe Quarles did it. Bergen dies of his injuries. It is later revealed to have been Arlo who shot him when he saw a man in hat pointing a gun at Boyd (his son Raylan is famous for his cowboy hat).

==== Nick Mooney ====
Sheriff Nick Mooney (played by William Gregory Lee) is a corrupt cop in Harlan, first appearing in season 2 as Doyle Bennett's subordinate and after Doyle's death, he becomes a deputy under Sheriff Napier in season 3. As a deputy he does as Napier instructs him even going so far as to plant drugs in Shelby Parlow's truck during the race for sheriff. Mooney later becomes a deputy working under Shelby after Napier is stripped of his election win and conspires with Lee Paxton to frame Boyd Crowder for the murder of Delroy Baker, but this backfires when Ava Crowder is arrested and charged for the murder instead. In season 5, Mooney becomes the new Sheriff of Harlan after Shelby is placed in witness protection after being revealed to be notorious fugitive Drew Thompson. As Sheriff he has Paxton's wife, Mara, confess that Boyd assaulted her husband but threatens her at gunpoint when she recants as Mooney and his men attempt to arrest Boyd. Boyd learns that Paxton has requested Mooney to kill him and bribes him with the money he was going to give to Paxton if he does as he requests and claims that he has killed Boyd, showing him the severed hand with a tattoo matching Boyd's. Mooney meets with Boyd to collect his payment but is instead shot and killed by an old mining friend of Boyd's.

==== Tillman Napier ====
Sheriff Tillman Napier (played by David Andrews) is the former Sheriff of Harlan County, bribed by Robert Quarles to look the other way while he makes a play to take over the Oxy business, as well as prevent Boyd from getting in his way. Napier and his men frame Boyd for an attempted murder by placing dynamite under his car and setting it off, arresting Boyd on local television in order to popularize his campaign. In order to stop Napier and Quarles, Boyd enlists Shelby Parlow to run against Napier in the election. Napier ultimately wins the election, but is forced to be stripped of the victory when Napier's sister Hanna is found to be working on the county clerk's payroll (Boyd had coerced his sister into doing so previously). After losing, Napier attempts to sever his ties with Quarles, who becomes hostile towards the former Sheriff when he can't get his endorsement money back. Napier begins to host swinger parties for the Harlan Elite and Boyd gets invited to one of these parties in season 4 in order to look for Drew Thompson. Napier is last seen insulting Boyd and calling him a worm, saying he is as welcome to the party as "a case of the clap".

==== Ash Murphy ====
Ash Murphy (played by Todd Stashwick) is a corrupt prison guard at Tramble who is bribed by Boyd in order to gain access to Dickie Bennett in solitary confinement. Ash overhears Dickie telling Boyd about Mags' fortune he is to inherit from Ellstin Limehouse. Ash then sets out on his own agenda to get the money, going as far as to threaten to make Dickie's life in prison miserable if he doesn't tell him where the money is located. Along with a prison medic named Lance, Ash orchestrates a huge prison fight that results in both Dickie and Dewey (the latter having jumped in to defend Dickie and becomes a liability) being badly injured and slips both men unnoticed out of the prison in a coroner's van. Ash is unable to get Dickie into Noble's Holler due to a roadblock and decides to get Dickie to lead Limehouse to them with the money. While bringing food to the motel they are staying at, Ash attempts to shoot at Raylan, resulting in him being run over twice and telling Raylan they are meeting at Limehouse at Mags' old general store with the money.

When Lance comes up with a ruse to get their money by convincing the gullible Dewey Crowe that he has removed his kidneys and giving him a time limit to come up with the cash or else he will sell the kidneys, Ash tells Raylan that it was Lance's idea to come up with the fake kidney heist as Ash's nurse Layla overhears. Later in the episode, Layla is revealed to be Lance's girlfriend and accomplice, where she reveals she caused Ash to die from a stroke by sending an air bubble to his brain.

==== Jeremy Barkley ====
Agent Jeremy Barkley (played by Stephen Tobolowsky) is an FBI SAC from Lexington who begins to survey Sammy Tonin in season 3 and holds a strong resentment towards Raylan Givens, believing him to be dirty and working on Boyd Crowder's payroll. Ironically, season 4 reveals that Barkley himself was dirty as he was working on the Drew Thompson case in order to provide information to his old friend Nicky Augustine, a henchman for Theo Tonin. Nicky, frustrated that the FBI lost the Drew Thompson case to the Marshals, shoots Barkley in the head.

==== Bob Sweeney ====
Constable Bob Sweeney (played by Patton Oswalt) is an affable yet honorable and courageous constable in Harlan. His title as Constable doesn't earn him respect from anyone, but he persists in his duties and does his best to help Raylan and other law enforcement when he can. He drives an old beat-up Gremlin and always has his "go bag", a duffel bag filled with survival items including an AK-47, at the ready. He proves useful and very courageous during the hunt for Drew Thompson when he is severely beaten by one of Augustine's henchmen for refusing to divulge the whereabouts of Raylan and Drew. Bob returns in season 6 to assist Raylan in tracking down his runaway CI, Ava Crowder. When Ava runs again, this time with her Uncle Zachariah and $10,000,000, Bob manages to capture her but shortly after he is shot twice by Boyd and left bleeding on a mountainside. Bob is last seen being taken to the hospital by Raylan.

=== Other characters ===
==== Gary Hawkins ====
Gary Hawkins (played by William Ragsdale) is a real estate agent and Winona's husband in the first two seasons. As such he has an antagonistic relationship with Raylan, seeing him as a threat not only to his marriage but also his life. He becomes indebted to the Detroit Mob, specifically Wynn Duffy, after the housing bubble bursts and the large properties he purchased with mob money becomes worthless. He sells his land back to Arnett, much to Duffy's anger, as he wants cash not land. In season 2 Gary hires Duffy to kill his estranged wife, Winona, in order to collect the insurance money. Raylan thwarts the attempt on her life assuming it was meant for him. Raylan figures out who was behind the hit and confronts Duffy with Gary in tow, before informing Gary that Duffy always intended to kill him too. Gary leaves Kentucky running for his life. In season 3 he is tracked down and murdered by Duffy and Quarles in order to frame Raylan.

==== Mike Cosmatopolis ====
Mike "Mikey" Cosmatopolis (played by Jonathan Kowalsky) is introduced in season 2 as the newly hired bodyguard of Dixie Mafia middleman Wynn Duffy after Duffy had been shot in the previous season during a shootout with Raylan Givens, Emmitt Arnett and Emmitt's bodyguard. Fiercely loyal to his employer who affectionately refers to him as "Mikey", he is often seen by his side during business meetings. Season 6 sees his role expanded as he becomes appalled by Duffy becoming a CI for the Marshals in the RICO case against Boyd Crowder and even more so when he finds out Duffy was the one responsible for snitching on Katherine Hale's late husband Grady. Mikey takes Duffy hostage and calls Katherine to turn him in but upon hearing her speech about avenging the person you love, Mikey refuses to allow Katherine to kill Duffy and tries to convince her to simply get the word out that Duffy is a rat and let him fend for himself, but this results in Katherine shooting Mikey in frustration and a brutal fight that leaves Mikey shot four more times throughout his body and Katherine dead with a broken trachea. Bleeding profusely from the bullet wounds, Mikey's final words are asking Duffy to hold him before he dies.

==== Carol Johnson ====
Carol Johnson (played by Rebecca Creskoff) is representative of Black Pike Coal, the main coal mining company in Harlan. She is sent to Harlan in season 2 in order to convince the locals to sell their land to Black Pike for the company's expanded operations. Her endeavors draw hatred and criticism from most locals as they see the coal company as nothing more than an outsider ready to destroy their land for profit. She hires Boyd Crowder as security and a negotiator when she learns how he saved the company from a heist. Carol and Mags butt heads several times over the matter of land and coal but eventually reach an agreement. Boyd, having figured out what Black Pike wants the land for, acquires the rights to the final property in question, Arlo's house. Mags and Boyd reach an agreement and then force Carol into paying triple the amount originally negotiated.

==== Wade Messer ====
Wade Messer (played by James LeGros) is a small-time criminal in Harlan. He first appears as an associate of the Bennett family in season 2. When Loretta McCready finds out about her father's fate she pays Wade $150 for a ride back to Harlan and Mags' house seeking revenge. Wade leaves her at a gas stop outside Harlan when he sees a revolver in her bag. Dickie pressures Wade into setting up Raylan for a trap. Messer later becomes an Oxy addict working for a pawn broker where he is again pressured into setting Raylan up except this time Raylan foils his trap. Following the death of his boss Messer lands in prison but is released in season 5. He begins working for Dewey at Audry's Whore House as a bartender. When Dewey finds out Messer has been informing on him and skimming from the earnings Dewey leads him into the woods where he shoots and kills him.

==== Ellstin Limehouse ====
Ellstin Limehouse (played by Mykelti Williamson) is a butcher and the omnipresent protector of Noble's Holler, who knows everything about events in Harlan via the people who invest their money with him and has harbored abused women over the years seeking protection from their husbands, such as Raylan Givens's mother Frances and Ava Crowder. Introduced in season 3, his main storyline revolves around Dickie Bennett attempting to reclaim his mother's $3,000,000 that was left with Limehouse and having to deal with his right-hand man Errol's moves risking exposing the people of Noble's Holler. In the Season 3 finale, Quarles attempts to rob him of his money so that he can pay Theo Tonin's fee to return home to Detroit but Limehouse ends up severing Quarles' gun arm while he struggles with Raylan. Season 4, Ellen May and Shelby attempt to hide out in the holler from Theo and the Marshals but Limehouse takes advantage of Shelby's real identity of notorious fugitive Drew Thompson and kidnaps both Ellen May and Shelby, eventually selling Shelby to Boyd and Ava for $150,000 and releasing Ellen May before she can be bought by Ava.

In season 6, Ava visits him to negotiate a deal for a car so that she can leave town and offers to get her hands on Boyd's money from a bank robbery. However, she fails to get him the money as she is arrested by Raylan at a hardware store. Limehouse calls Boyd and informs him of Ava's attempted run, causing Boyd to question and threaten her. Limehouse forces a reluctant Boyd to give him $100,000 for a clean slate for himself and new identities for himself and Ava on the grounds that Boyd must never set foot in Harlan County again. In the series finale, Limehouse is one of the few people Raylan and the Marshals suspected helped smuggle Ava past roadblocks so that she could escape Harlan, but Limehouse had an alibi for that day because he had left Noble's the previous day.

==== Loretta McCready ====
Loretta McCready (played by Kaitlyn Dever) is a teenage girl involved in the Bennett family business of growing and selling weed. After she is attacked by a paedophile henchman of the Bennetts, her father calls in a tip to the Marshals Service to protect her. When Mags finds out Loretta's dad went outside for help she poisons him. Mags takes Loretta in and informs her that she sent her dad south to work for the family. Resourceful and intelligent, Loretta forms a bond with both Mags and Raylan but eventually discovers Mags's true nature. Her suspicions about her father's leaving are confirmed when she sees Coover wearing her father's wrist watch. She calls Raylan in a state of panic telling him what she found out. A drunk, high, and angry Coover kidnaps her and plans to reunite her and her father at the bottom of a mine shaft. Raylan arrives at the mine and brawls with Coover shortly before fatally shooting him. Loretta is then placed in foster care with child services well outside of Mags's grasp. She confronts Mags in the Season 2 finale, shooting but not killing her before being placed back into foster care.

In season 6 she secretly buys the Bennett family land from Dickie with the money left to her by Mags. This brings her into conflict with Avery Markham as he tries to buy up fertile land to grow legal marijuana. She eventually forms a partnership with Boyd to fend off Markham and his thugs. She offers to buy land from the people of Harlan, same as Markham, only she won't move them out or kill them like he would. Her continued conflict with Markham brings her into contact with his henchman, Boon, who takes a strong liking to her. When she still refuses to cooperate with Markham he has Boon kill her aunt, her last living relative. Boon then tracks her down at the old Bennett weed shed and Markham makes her one final offer to come around or die. Loretta talks her way out of it telling Markham the people of Harlan will listen to her and not him as he's an outsider. She agrees to help Markham in his plans to buy land. Loretta is last seen during the duel between Raylan and Boon, when the two collapse from their wounds she kicks Boon's gun away before he can fire another shot at Raylan.

==== Errol Butler ====
Errol Butler (played by Demetrius Grosse) is Ellstin Limehouse's right-hand man in Noble's Holler. Errol's hand is also shown to be badly burned from lye, possibly by Limehouse for disobeying him at some point. In season 3, Errol is shown to resemble Boyd's own former right-hand Johnny Crowder, as he is willing to turn on his leader any chance he gets and attempts to make several power plays to increase Limehouse's wealth and power, all without his boss's permission. These plays eventually get Errol kicked out of Noble's Holler in the finale "Slaughterhouse", but he returns to defend Limehouse when he sees Robert Quarles returning with Raylan Givens and another hostage. Errol takes a bullet for Limehouse and his fate is left ambiguous as the season ends.

In the Season 6 episode "Sounding", Errol is revealed to be alive and on better terms with Limehouse and is ordered by him to accompany Ava into gathering supplies at a hardware store in order to excavate Boyd's money from a bank robbery to pay off Limehouse for a car. Bob Sweeney and Raylan approach the hardware store, Bob having tracked down Errol from Noble's. Bob and Errol have a stand-off as Bob attempts to lure Errol out of the store on a bogus charge so that Raylan can get Ava back into his custody. Bob then uses a taser on Errol when he refuses to cooperate and leave with him out of the store.
