= Cash Game (Justified) =

- Justified episode
- Episode no.: Season 6 Episode 2
- Directed by: Dean Parisot
- Written by: Dave Andron & VJ Boyd
- Cinematography by: Attila Szalay
- Editing by: Eric L. Beason & Jean Crupper
- Original air date: January 27, 2015
- Running time: 45 minutes

Guest appearances
- Mary Steenburgen as Katherine Hale; Garret Dillahunt as Ty Walker; Rick Gomez as AUSA David Vasquez; Scott Grimes as Seabass; Brad Leland as Calhoun Schreier; Duke Davis Roberts as Choo-Choo Mundo; Robin Pearson Rose as Homeowner #1; Ryan Dorsey as Earl; Charles Howerton as Homeowner #2; Sam Elliott as Avery Markham

Episode chronology
| ← Previous "Fate's Right Hand" | Next → "Noblesse Oblige" |
- Justified (season 6)

"Cash Game" is the second episode of the sixth season of the American Neo-Western television series Justified. It is the 67th overall episode of the series and was written by executive producer Dave Andron and producer VJ Boyd and directed by Dean Parisot. It originally aired on FX on January 27, 2015.

The series is based on Elmore Leonard's stories about the character Raylan Givens, particularly "Fire in the Hole", which serves as the basis for the episode. The series follows Raylan Givens, a tough deputy U.S. Marshal enforcing his own brand of justice. The series revolves around the inhabitants and culture in the Appalachian Mountains area of eastern Kentucky, specifically Harlan County where many of the main characters grew up. In the episode, Raylan and Tim work in investigating the bank robbery and they also have to deal with Ty Walker once again when their case crosses up with his. Meanwhile, Ava discovers Boyd's actions in the bank, while Boyd tries to know more about the content of the ledger.

According to Nielsen Media Research, the episode was seen by an estimated 1.71 million household viewers and gained a 0.5 ratings share among adults aged 18–49. The episode received very positive reviews from critics, who praised Sam Elliott's debut in the series, writing, pace and building momentum.

== Plot ==
Ava (Joelle Carter) checks her barn in the morning when she hears noises, only finding Boyd (Walton Goggins), who was going to work on her porch. Ava asks him to leave. She then checks the barn and discovers the ledger and deeds from the bank robbery. Meanwhile, Ty Walker (Garret Dillahunt) attempts to buy a property from a couple whose family lived on the property for generations, but they refuse to accept his offer and he is offended when they call him "peacock".

Raylan (Timothy Olyphant) and Tim (Jacob Pitts) work on the bank robbery, meeting with those who rented the safety deposit boxes to discover what was stolen. Among their first stops is prominent realtor Calhoun Schreier (Brad Leland), who claims he'd emptied his box the day before the robbery. Calhoun takes the opportunity to attempt to broker the sale of Arlo's property to Walker, who is apprehensive of the Feds and has his cohort Choo-Choo Mundo (Duke Davis Roberts) follow the Marshals. Realizing they are being followed, Raylan and Tim trick Choo-Choo by having Raylan take his car, forcing Choo-Choo to ask for a ride to meet with his boss. Tim picks Choo-Choo up, as he is unaware that he was following him.

After meeting with Boyd and Duffy (Jere Burns), Katherine (Mary Steenburgen) meets with Avery Markham (Sam Elliott), her lover. Avery is a big-time criminal recently back from Colorado with a small fortune from legalized cannabis. Katherine is quietly suspicious of Avery, who left Kentucky when her then-husband and his partner Grady Hale were ratted out to the Feds fifteen years earlier. Ava meets with Raylan to show him the ledger and deeds. Raylan tells her to keep them for her own safety.

Tim and Choo-Choo meet at a restaurant, The Pizza Portal, with Choo-Choo's friend Seabass (Scott Grimes). Tim tries to get information from them although they suspect him due to his constant questioning. Seabass kicks him out but Tim reveals he is a Marshal before leaving. Raylan visits Calhoun in his office, as he was extorted by someone (Boyd) that his ledger has been stolen from the safe deposit box. It's also revealed that the ledger is actually a list of details and accounts Calhoun has been keeping for his own protection, feeling he'd gotten in over his head. Boyd confronts Ava about the missing ledger, but Ava turns the table, upset that Boyd put her own safety in jeopardy for hiding the ledger on her barn and tells him to take it from the car and leave.

Boyd, frustrated with Katherine and Duffy about their claim that Calhoun has a $3 million cash stash to rob, tries to sell the ledger back to Calhoun. However, when Boyd brings the ledger to Calhoun's office, he finds Raylan waiting and hands over the stolen documents. During this, Walker intimidates the bank manager and learns that the Marshals top suspect in the robbery is Boyd. He later meets with Seabass in order to vandalize the older couple’s house who turned him down earlier. At the bar, Ava talks with Boyd, who tries to repair their relationship. She reveals that among the deeds one stood out: that of The Pizza Portal, which used to be a bank, and Boyd realizes where the money is hidden. The episode ends as Raylan and Tim visit Walker and Choo-Choo at the restaurant to return Choo-Choo's car. Raylan also tells Walker that if he wants Arlo's property, Raylan will want to talk with Walker's boss.

== Production ==
=== Development ===
In December 2014, it was reported that the second episode of the sixth season would be titled "Cash Game", and was to be directed by Dean Parisot and written by executive producer Dave Andron and producer VJ Boyd.

=== Writing ===
The Pizza Parlor restaurant was inspired by a real-life restaurant in Harlan named "The Portal", which the writers discovered during research for the season. The Portal was a restaurant with a bank vault, which intrigued the writers to integrate it into the episode. Series developer Graham Yost said, "so that's where it all came from. Then the people in Harlan said we could use the name."

=== Casting ===
Despite being credited, Nick Searcy does not appear in the episode as his respective character.

In September 2014, it was announced that Sam Elliott was joining the series in the recurring role of Avery Markham, "a legendary Kentucky gangster who returns from exile with a private army and a lot of cash — thanks to the legal weed he grew in Colorado — determined to win back his empire and lost love Katherine Hale. His quest is thwarted by Katherine herself, who secretly believes Markham brought down her husband. He isn't exactly chummy with Raylan either." The producers wanted Elliott, a fan of the series, on the series but scheduling conflicts prevented this from happen. Eventually, they reached out to him for the final season and he accepted the offer to play a villain. Elliott commented, "I'm not one to sit around and watch anything religiously on TV. But I was fascinated with the quality of it from the get-go. I was tickled when they came my way."

== Reception ==
=== Viewers ===
In its original American broadcast, "Cash Game" was seen by an estimated 1.71 million household viewers and gained a 0.5 ratings share among adults aged 18–49, according to Nielsen Media Research. This means that 0.5 percent of all households with televisions watched the episode. This was a 22% decrease in viewership from the previous episode, which was watched by 2.17 million viewers with a 0.6 in the 18-49 demographics.

=== Critical reviews ===
"Cash Game" received very positive reviews from critics. Seth Amitin of IGN gave the episode a "great" 8.8 out of 10 and wrote in his verdict, "'Cash Game' was a throwback to Season 2 and 3. It built well, it intrigued, it led to more. There was great dialogue in the meantime and some fun scenes as mundane as a realtor and his mistress talking about 'the cancer'. Hopefully this is proof of something great forthcoming."

Alasdair Wilkins of The A.V. Club gave the episode a "B" grade and wrote, "Overall, I'm pretty at peace with this being the show's final season, if only because it does feel like we're reaching the organic end of the story. But dammit, why'd the show have to wait six years to give us this much awesome Raylan-Tim action?" Kevin Fitzpatrick of Screen Crush wrote, "Not the most eventful of Justified episodes, even if Raylan and Boyd's pre-showdown over the realtor's stolen documents proved as electric as ever, and a fine preview of things to come, though the final season seems to be settling into a good rhythm, and laying the groundwork for its major villains. If nothing else, the humor remains as sharp as ever, and the Boyd-Tim pairing made for some strongly witty face-offs with respective branches of the enigmatic Tigerhawk."

Alan Sepinwall of HitFix wrote, "Last week's season premiere set up the Raylan/Ava/Boyd dynamic that will likely be the show's endgame. There's more of that here, with Ava again unsure which man (if either) she should trust, but a lot of 'Cash Game' is devoted to establishing the new faces in Harlan. I couldn't tell you exactly what any of them are up to, but I can that I sure enjoyed watching them maneuver around Raylan and each other." Jeff Stone of IndieWire gave the episode an "A" grade and wrote, "Tonight's episode was one of the funniest in recent memory, with nearly every scene offering a genuine laugh. That it’s also exciting and engaging is just icing on the cake."

Kyle Fowle of Entertainment Weekly wrote, "After last week's high stakes premiere, 'Cash Game' puts more of this season's primary pieces into place. It's a classic episode of Justified, emblematic of everything this show can do when it's at the top of its game. It not only deepens the larger narrative arc that will dominate the season but also gives us an isolated storyline to latch on to." Matt Zoller Seitz of Vulture gave the episode a perfect 5 star rating out of 5 and wrote, "The sixth season of Justified keeps humming along with 'Cash Game'. Written by Dave Andron and VJ Boyd, and directed by Dean Parisot, the episode’s crisp storytelling is reminiscent of the show’s superior, even-numbered seasons, which laid out a series of parallel-seeming subplots that converged with wit and grace."

James Queally of Los Angeles Times wrote, "Two episodes, two wins for Justified so far. It seems as if the show has found its footing again, and while that probably bodes ill for some of the show's main characters as we head toward the finish line, it's certainly great for the viewer." Sean McKenna of TV Fanatic gave the episode a 4.4 star rating out of 5 and wrote, "It's pretty clear that money is a driving force for a lot of the actions taking place in Harlan, and I'm intrigued to keep learning more about the various power players goals as they connect with each other. This already feels like a thrill ride I want to be locked into, whether its going up or racing back down." Jack McKinney of Paste gave the episode a 9.2 out of 10 and wrote, "Any concerns that the show wouldn't be able to get back on course have been answered and then some. If things had not improved, it could have been a very long 13 episodes. Suddenly, the 11 remaining episodes seem like not nearly enough."
