= Jake Busey =

American actor (born 1971)

- Busey at Dragon Con in 2026
- Born: William Jacob Busey; June 15, 1971 (age 55); Los Angeles, California, U.S.
- Occupation: Actor
- Years active: 1978–present
- Children: 1
- Father: Gary Busey

William Jacob Busey (/ˈbjuːsi/; born June 15, 1971) is an American actor. Among his most prominent roles have been serial killer Johnny Bartlett in The Frighteners (1996), Ace Levy in Starship Troopers (1997), Kyle Brenner in Tomcats (2001), Aiden Tanner in the television series From Dusk till Dawn: The Series (2014–2016), and Sean H. Keyes in The Predator (2018) and in the video game Predator: Hunting Grounds (2020). Busey also appears as a journalist in the third season of Stranger Things.

== Early life ==
Busey is the son of Judy Helkenberg and actor Gary Busey.

== Career ==
Busey's motion picture debut was in the 1978 crime film Straight Time with his father Gary, along with Dustin Hoffman and Theresa Russell. His two most notable appearances are as the murderous religious fanatic opposite Jodie Foster in Contact and as smart-mouthed soldier Ace Levy in Starship Troopers, both in 1997. Additionally, he has had major roles in Peter Jackson's The Frighteners (1996) with Michael J. Fox, Home Fries (1998) with Drew Barrymore and Luke Wilson, Tomcats (2001) opposite Jerry O'Connell and Shannon Elizabeth, James Mangold's thriller Identity (2003), The Hitcher II: I've Been Waiting (2003) with C. Thomas Howell, and Road House 2 (2006). He appeared in H. G. Wells' War of the Worlds, one of three 2005 film adaptations of the novel by H. G. Wells, alongside C. Thomas Howell. Busey played the role of "Backfire" in Patrick Durham's movie Cross which was released directly to DVD and download in May 2011, and starred in the independent film Don't Pass Me By (2012).

He has also had minor parts in films like The Stoned Age (1994), PCU (1994), I'll Do Anything (1994), Windrunner: A Spirited Journey (1995) starring Jason Wiles, Twister (1996) starring Helen Hunt, Enemy of the State (1998) starring Will Smith, Fast Sofa (2001) with Jennifer Tilly and Natasha Lyonne, Christmas with the Kranks (2004) starring Tim Allen, The Killing Jar (2010), and Reaper (2014) with Danny Trejo and Vinnie Jones. He also had a main role on the television series Shasta McNasty. Busey portrayed Professor Aiden "Sex Machine" Tanner from 2014 to 2016 in From Dusk till Dawn: The Series.

He also provided the voice of The Radioman in the 2012 video game Spec Ops: The Line and of the DJ of Resistance Radio in XCOM 2: War of the Chosen. Additionally, he voiced Teenage Tom during flashback scenes in the 1989 film Hider in the House which his father, Gary Busey starred in as Tom Sykes. In 2016, Busey starred in the feature film Deserted.

In 2018, Busey appeared in two episodes of Agents of S.H.I.E.L.D. portraying Mack's old friend Tony Caine. He also portrayed Sean H. Keyes in the film The Predator (2018) and the video game Predator: Hunting Grounds (2020). In 2019, Busey joined the cast of Stranger Things in the third season portraying a journalist named Bruce Lowe.

== Personal life ==
Busey and his girlfriend have a daughter.

== Filmography ==
=== Film ===
Year	Title	Role	Notes	Reference(s)
1978	Straight Time	Henry Darin		
1982	Barbarosa	Cook Boy		
1989	Hider in the House	Teenage Tom Sykes	Voice	
1993	Shimmer	Richard Halverson		
1994	Foot Shooting Party	Unknown	Short film	
1994	S.F.W.	Morrow Streeter		
1994	The Stoned Age	Jimmy Muldoon		
1994	PCU	Mersh		
1994	I'll Do Anything	Unknown		
1995	Quiet Days in Hollywood	Curt		
1995	Windrunner	Dave Promisco		
1996	The Frighteners	Johnny Charles Bartlett		
1996	Twister	Mobile Lab Technician		
1997	Contact	Joseph		
1997	Starship Troopers	Private "Ace" Levy		
1998	Black Cat Run	Deputy Norm Babbitt		
1998	Enemy of the State	NSA Agent Krug		
1998	Home Fries	Angus		
1999	Held Up	Beaumont		
1999	Tail Lights Fade	Bruce		
2001	Tomcats	Kyle Brenner		
2001	Fast Sofa	Rick Jeffers		
2002	The First $20 Million Is Always the Hardest	Darrell		
2003	Identity	Robert Maine		
2003	Lost Junction	Matt		
2003	The Hitcher II: I've Been Waiting	Jack	Direct-to-video	
2004	Christmas with the Kranks	Officer Treen		
2004	The Tao of Pong	Maurice	Short film	
2005	H. G. Wells' War of the Worlds	Lieutenant Samuelson	Direct-to-video	
2005	The Rain Makers	Shaw	Associate producer	
2006	Road House 2	Bill "Wild Bill" Decarie	Direct-to-video	
2006	Wristcutters: A Love Story	Brian		
2006	Broken	Vince		
2008	Time Bomb	Jason Philby	Direct-to-video	
2010	The Killing Jar	Greene		
2011	Cross	"Backfire"	Direct-to-video; Also producer	
2012	Play James Play	Paul		
2012	Don't Pass Me By	Fred Norwick		
2012	Nazis at the Center of the Earth	Adrian Reistad	Direct-to-video	
2012	Beverly Hills Chihuahua 3: Viva la Fiesta!	Oscar	Direct-to-video; voice	
2013	Girl Meets Boy	Richard		
2013	Sparks	"Sledge"		
2014	Reaper	Bill		
2015	Most Likely to Die	Tarkin		
2016	Last Man Club	Jim "Diamond Jim"		
2016	Deserted	Clay		
2016	Arbor Demon	Sean		
2017	Dead Again in Tombstone	Colonel Jackson Boomer		
2017	Dead Ant	Merrick		
2018	The Predator	Sean Keyes		
2018	A Boy Called Sailboat	Mr. Bing		
2019	Ghost in the Graveyard	Charlie Sullivan		
2020	A Soldier's Revenge	Captain McCalister		
2024	Guns & Moses	Owen Gibbons		
2024	Rust	Drum Parker		
2025	Killing Mary Sue	Wes Adamle		
TBA	Gettysburg 1863 †	TBA	Filming	

Key
†	Denotes films that have not yet been released

=== Television ===
Year	Title	Role	Notes	Reference(s)
1992	Cruel Doubt	Student	Television film	
1994	Motorcycle Gang	Jake	Television film	
1994	Tales from the Crypt	Frank	Episode: "Surprise Party"	
1999	Shasta McNasty	Dennis	Main role; 22 episodes	
2001	Jeremiah	Jake Davenport	Episode: "The Bag"	
2002	The Twilight Zone	Vincent Hansen	Episode: "Chosen"	
2004	Charmed	Warlock	Episode: "WitchStock"	
2005	Code Breakers	Straub	Television film	
2007	CSI: Miami	Phillip Craven	Episode: "Internal Affairs"	
2008	Comanche Moon	Tudwal	2 episodes	
2009	The Mentalist	Vern Nichols	Episode: "Red Badge"	
2010	The Good Guys	Brody	Episode: "Dan on the Run"	
2011	CSI: NY	Randy Davis	Episode: "Keep It Real"	
2011	Good Vibes	Dirk Kirk "Turk" Turkpatrick	12 episodes; voice	
2012	The Finder	Bobby the Twin	Episode: "Swing and a Miss"	
2012	Franklin & Bash	Dr. Doug	Episode: "Waiting on a Friend"	
2013	Psych	FBI Agent	Episode: "Santabarbaratown 2"	
2014–2016	From Dusk till Dawn: The Series	Professor Aiden "Sex Machine" Tanner	26 episodes	
2015	Justified	Lewis "The Wiz" Mago	Episode: "The Trash and the Snake"	
2015	Texas Rising	Samuel Wallace	2 episodes	
2017	Day 5	Carl	2 episodes	
2017	Ray Donovan	Acid Man	3 episodes	
2017	Freakish	Earl	5 episodes	
2018	Agents of S.H.I.E.L.D.	Tony Caine	2 episodes	
2018	NCIS	Whit Dexter	Episode: "Handle With Care"	
2019	Stranger Things	Bruce Lowe	5 episodes	
2019	L.A.'s Finest	Bishop Duvall	5 episodes	
2019	Mr. Robot	Freddy Lomax	Episode: "401 Unauthorized"	
2019	Swamp Thing	Shaw	Episode: "Loose Ends"	
2022	The Rookie: Feds	Rusty Filmore	Episode: "Star Crossed"	
2023	Chaos on the Farm	Lawrence	Television film	

=== Video games ===
List of Jake Busey video games credits
Year	Title	Role	Notes	Reference(s)
2012	Spec Ops: The Line	Robert "Radioman" Darden	Voice	
2016	XCOM 2: War of the Chosen	DJ of Resistance Radio	Voice	
2020	Predator: Hunting Grounds	Sean Keyes	Voice	
