= Ryan Dorsey =

American actor (born 1983)

- Born: Ryan Keith Dorsey; July 19, 1983 (age 42); Chesapeake, West Virginia, U.S.
- Occupation: Actor
- Years active: 2013–present
- Spouse: Naya Rivera (m. 2014; div. 2018)
- Children: 1

Ryan Keith Dorsey (born July 19, 1983) is an American actor, known for playing Earl on Justified and Duquesne "Dime Bag" Baker on Ray Donovan. His personal life, particularly his marriage to Naya Rivera, has garnered significant media attention.

== Early life ==
Ryan Keith Dorsey was born in the small coal mining town of Chesapeake, near Charleston, West Virginia, on July 19, 1983. After attending middle school in West Virginia, he moved to Charlotte, North Carolina, for high school. He said that he decided to move to Charlotte, where his mother lived, because he felt that in a bigger city he would have more sporting opportunities. However, he returned to West Virginia and joined Riverside High School when it became consolidated. He had not intended this, but received a head injury while visiting his father on Thanksgiving; subsequent medical treatments in his hometown kept him there. He became interested in acting during his senior year of high school after a football injury prevented him from playing, and he was encouraged to join theatre; his high school theatre program was run by a professional Hollywood actor taking time off. Dorsey studied theatre at Western Carolina University, with plans to join their football team, but dropped out and moved to New York City during his freshman year, enrolling at the New York Conservatory for Dramatic Arts.

== Career ==
Dorsey began acting professionally shortly after moving to New York, working primarily in television, taking his first roles in 2013 on Southland and Parks and Recreation. He is mainly known for his recurring role as Earl on Justified in 2015, and then Duquesne "Dime Bag" Baker on Ray Donovan in 2017, and his other appearances include recurring roles on Pitch, Bosch, Yellowstone, Runaways, Stumptown, The Vampire Diaries and Nashville.

He was originally contracted for a three episode arc on Justified, before being bumped to five and then ten episodes of the thirteen-episode season. On Pitch he portrayed Tommy Miller, a member of the baseball team who objects to a woman joining the team, and he played Blake in the second season of Yellowstone. His debut feature film role came in 2016's Blood Father, a French film in the English language starring Mel Gibson, with Dorsey in a small role as the drug dealer Shamrock. In January 2021, Dorsey was added to the cast of the ABC drama Big Sky as recurring character Rand Kleinsasser. In December 2025–January 2026, Dorsey starred in the second season of the Apple TV period comedy-drama Palm Royale as recurring character Jedebedaiah.

== Personal life ==
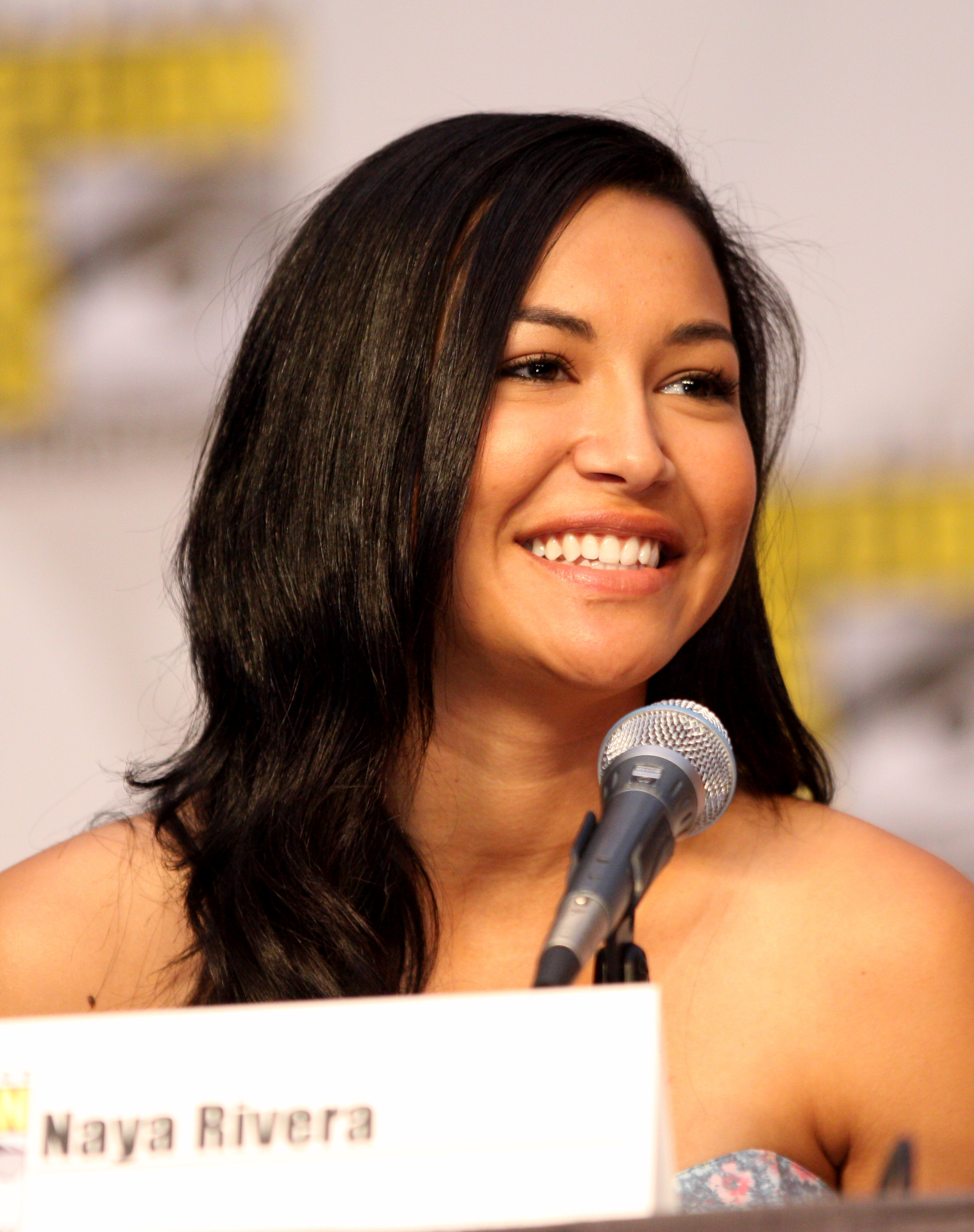
Naya Rivera in 2010; Dorsey and Rivera were married between 2014 and 2018.

Dorsey met actress Naya Rivera in 2010, and they briefly dated before splitting because, as Dorsey's father described it, Dorsey was "a playboy." Rivera revealed in a 2016 memoir that she had an abortion in 2010, shortly after splitting from Dorsey, due to the fact that her career was taking off with her successful role on Glee.

Rivera and Dorsey got together again in 2014 after her split from rapper Big Sean, which is when she told him about the abortion; she said that he was supportive and respectful when she did. Dorsey and Rivera married in Cabo San Lucas, Mexico, on Dorsey's birthday, July 19, 2014; they did not announce the engagement or wedding until several days later on July 23. In February 2015, the couple announced that they were expecting their first child, and their son, Josey Hollis, was born on September 17, 2015. Josey was being raised by his mother as bilingual in Spanish and English, due to her multicultural heritage.

In November 2016, Rivera filed for divorce after two years of marriage, but called off the separation in October 2017. Over Thanksgiving 2017, Rivera was arrested and charged in Kanawha County, West Virginia, with misdemeanor domestic battery against Dorsey after she allegedly hit him in the head during an altercation over their child, and was picked up from the courthouse by Dorsey's father. She subsequently refiled for divorce in December 2017, and in January 2018 the domestic battery charge was dismissed at the request of Dorsey, who "notified both the prosecution and the defense counsel that he was no longer seeking prosecution and has confirmed he was never at any time injured by the conduct of Ms. Rivera." On June 14, 2018, Rivera and Dorsey finalized their divorce, sharing joint custody of Josey, with both waiving rights to child support. The joint custody agreement was modified in March 2020, giving Rivera primary custody while stipulating Dorsey "be afforded frequent and meaningful custodial contact." After Rivera's death in July 2020, Dorsey obtained sole custody. In November 2020, he brought a wrongful death lawsuit regarding Rivera, on behalf of Josey.
