= Joelle Carter =

American actress (born 1972)

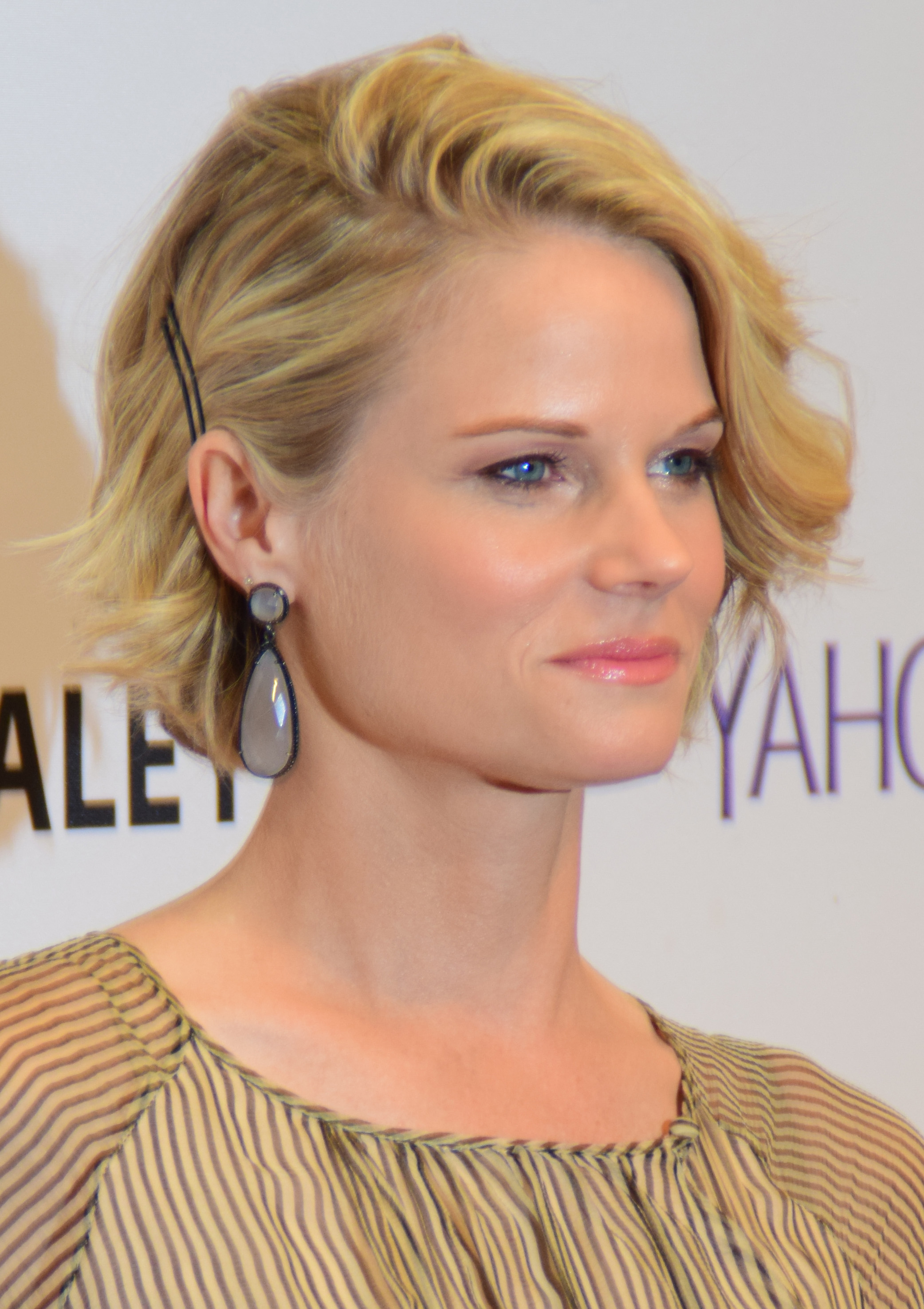
- Carter in 2015
- Born: Joelle Marie Carter; October 10, 1972 (age 54); Thomasville, Georgia, U.S.
- Education: Augusta State University
- Occupation: Actress
- Years active: 1992–present
- Spouse: Andy Bates (m. 2009; sep. 2016)
- Children: 1

Joelle Marie Carter (born October 10, 1972) is an American actress. She is known for playing Ava Crowder in the FX series Justified, and Laura Nagel in the NBC show Chicago Justice, part of the One Chicago universe.

== Early life ==
Carter was born in Thomasville, Georgia. Her father, Jimmy, was in the U.S. Army and the family moved often throughout the United States. She attended high school in Albany, Georgia, and enrolled at Augusta State University on a full athletic scholarship for swimming and cross-country. She studied acting at the William Esper Studio.

== Career ==
Carter moved to New York at 19 to become a model, but has stated it was not her idea, and that a photographer and her mother sent photos he had taken of her to several modelling agencies, which responded enthusiastically.

Modeling led to a fascination with acting and a move to Los Angeles, CA where she has been featured in many shows and in films including High Fidelity, Inconceivable, Cold Storage and American Pie 2. From 2010 to 2015, she played Ava Crowder in the television series Justified on FX, a role that won her notice and earned her a Critics' Choice Television Award nomination for best supporting actress in 2015. She also appeared in Kevin Greutert's 2014 horror-thriller film Jessabelle.

== Personal life ==
Carter had a long term relationship with Andy Bates, a filmmaker with whom she formed a film production company named Blarma in 2006 and whom she married in 2009. The couple adopted a baby girl in 2010 at birth. In 2016, the couple separated.

She currently lives and works in Los Angeles, California.

== Filmography ==
=== Film ===
| Year | Title | Role | Notes |
|---|---|---|---|
| 1998 | The Horse Whisperer | Office Worker #1 | |
| 1998 | Just One Time | Amy | Short |
| 1999 | Suits | Heidi Wilson | |
| 1999 | Just One Time | Amy | |
| 2000 | It Had to Be You | Claire Parker | |
| 2000 | Swimming | Josee | |
| 2000 | High Fidelity | Penny Hardwick | |
| 2000 | Lisa Picard Is Famous | Brenda | |
| 2001 | American Pie 2 | Natalie | |
| 2002 | Crazy Little Thing | Kate | |
| 2003 | Justice | Monique | |
| 2004 | When Will I Be Loved | Sam | |
| 2005 | Nick and Stacey | Stacey | Short |
| 2006 | Room 314 | Stacey | |
| 2008 | Remarkable Power | Reporter | |
| 2008 | A Girl and a Gun | Girl | Short |
| 2008 | Jumping In | Laura | Short |
| 2009 | Cold Storage | Cathy | |
| 2010 | To Be Friends | Her | |
| 2010 | Eyes to See | Grace | Short |
| 2012 | Lost Angeles | Jamie Furkes | |
| 2013 | It's Not You, It's Me | Carrie | |
| 2013 | Red Wing | Vera Sexton | |
| 2013 | A Perfect Man | Lynn | |
| 2014 | Buddy | Stella | Short |
| 2014 | The Living | Angela | |
| 2014 | Jessabelle | Kate Laurent | |
| 2015 | The Week | Lenny Wright | |
| 2015 | Certifiable | Beverly | Short |
| 2020 | She's in Portland | Rebecca | |
| 2020 | The Big Ugly | Bar Owner | |
| 2023 | The Hill | Hellen Hill | |

=== Television ===
| Year | Title | Role | Notes |
|---|---|---|---|
| 1996 | Law & Order | Donna Richland | "Girlfriends" |
| 2000 | Quarantine | Luce Kempers | TV film |
| 2000 | Wonderland | Heather Miles | Main role (6 episodes) |
| 2001 | Final Jeopardy | Sandra Bonventre | TV film |
| 2002 | The Job | Sharon | "Gina" |
| 2002–2003 | Third Watch | Tori | "Judgment Day: Part 1", "Castles of Sand", "Snow Blind" |
| 2004 | The Jury | Cassandra Nichols | "Memories" |
| 2004 | Tempting Adam | Lauren | TV film |
| 2005 | Inconceivable | Patrice Locicero | "Sex, Lies and Sonograms" |
| 2006 | Justice | Amber Wilson | "Addicts" |
| 2006 | CSI: Miami | Abby Biggs | "If Looks Could Kill" |
| 2007 | Cold Case | Kylie Cramer (1989) | "Thick as Thieves" |
| 2009 | Monk | Barbara O'Keefe | "Mr. Monk Goes to Group Therapy" |
| 2009 | Three Rivers | Barbara Harris | "The Luckiest Man" |
| 2010–2015 | Justified | Ava Crowder | Main role (73 episodes); Nominated – Critics' Choice Television Award for Best Supporting Actress in a Drama Series (2015) |
| 2011 | Choke.Kick.Girl: The Series | Jessica Steinman | "Superman Punch the Clown", "Overhand Right, Right?!", "Hit Her Button" |
| 2011 | Body of Proof | Andrea Davidson | "Love Thy Neighbor" |
| 2011 | Prime Suspect | Louise Giordano | "Great Guy, Yet: Dead" |
| 2011 | Grey's Anatomy | Mary Rolich | "Poker Face" |
| 2013 | Castle | Maggie Ingram | "Like Father, Like Daughter" |
| 2014 | My Daughter Must Live | Ragen O'Malley | TV film |
| 2014 | Constantine | Jasmine Fell | "The Devil's Vinyl" |
| 2016 | Scandal | Vanessa Moss | "The Fish Rots from the Head", "I See You", "Pencils Down", "Till Death Do Us Part" |
| 2016 | Chicago P.D. | Laura Nagel | "Justice" |
| 2017 | Chicago Justice | Laura Nagel | Main role |
| 2018 | The Rookie | Megan Mitchell Hawke | Episode: "The Hawke" |
| 2018 | Dirty John | Denise Meehan-Shepherd | Episode: "Lord High Executioner" |
| 2020 | Chicago Med | Lynn | Episode: "Guess it Doesn't Matter Anymore" |
| 2020-2021 | Home Before Dark | Kim Collins | Main Role |
| 2023 | FBI | Gwen Carter | Season 5, Episode 12: "Protégé" |
| TBA | Salvage | Sunny Daniels | TV film, pre-production |
