= The Hatchet Tour =

- Justified episode
- Episode no.: Season 4 Episode 9
- Directed by: Lesli Linka Glatter
- Written by: Taylor Elmore & Leonard Chang
- Cinematography by: Richard Crudo
- Editing by: Keith Henderson
- Original air date: March 5, 2013
- Running time: 42 minutes

Guest appearances
- Jim Beaver as Sheriff Shelby Parlow; Jere Burns as Wynn Duffy; Ron Eldard as Colton "Colt" Rhodes; Sam Anderson as Lee Paxton; Ned Bellamy as Gerald Johns; Mel Fair as Deputy Marshal Nelson Dunlop; Brian Howe as Arnold; David Meunier as Johnny Crowder; Lindsay Pulsipher as Cassie St. Cyr; Brent Sexton as Hunter Mosley; Patton Oswalt as Constable Bob Sweeney

Episode chronology
← Previous "Outlaw"	Next → "Get Drew"
- Justified (season 4)

"The Hatchet Tour" is the ninth episode of the fourth season of the American Neo-Western television series Justified. It is the 48th overall episode of the series and was written by supervising producer Taylor Elmore and Leonard Chang and directed by Lesli Linka Glatter. It originally aired on FX on March 5, 2013.

The series is based on Elmore Leonard's stories about the character Raylan Givens, particularly "Fire in the Hole", which serves as the basis for the episode. The series follows Raylan Givens, a tough deputy U.S. Marshal enforcing his own brand of justice. The series revolves around the inhabitants and culture in the Appalachian Mountains area of eastern Kentucky, specifically Harlan County where many of the main characters grew up. In the episode, Raylan decides to transport Hunter Mosley to prison while also intending to find Drew Thompson with his information. Meanwhile, Boyd and Ava discover that Colt is hiding something from the Ellen May situation.

According to Nielsen Media Research, the episode was seen by an estimated 2.32 million household viewers and gained a 0.9 ratings share among adults aged 18–49. The episode received extremely positive reviews from critics, who praised the writing, character development and Shelby's surprise reveal.

== Plot ==
Tim (Jacob Pitts) is called to the crime scene of the murder of Mark and the drug dealer. He does not give information to the authorities but knows Colt (Ron Eldard) may have been involved. Meanwhile, Hunter Mosley (Brent Sexton) is set to be transported to another facility. To his shock, Raylan (Timothy Olyphant) will be taking him in his car.

Mullen (Nick Searcy) is furious at Marshall Nelson Dunlop (Mel Fair) for letting Raylan escort Mosley to the prison. Tim warns Raylan about this and sets out to meet him at a location. Raylan takes Mosley with Duffy (Jere Burns) at his trailer. There, Raylan tells Duffy that Mosley knows who Drew Thompson is, ensuring that Duffy's criminal group will come after Mosley in jail. Raylan leaves with Mosley to go see two Clover Hillers that could be Drew Thompson. On the way there, Mosley jumps out of Raylan's car and tries to kill himself by standing in front of a tractor trailer. Raylan saves him at the last minute. After that, current Harlan County Sheriff Shelby Parlow pulls over Raylan and tells Raylan that Mullen is looking for him. After finding out where Raylan is going, Shelby joins Raylan and Mosley in their car.

After house shopping with Boyd (Walton Goggins), Ava (Joelle Carter) is visited by Cassie (Lindsay Pulsipher), who is looking for Ellen May. Ava is shocked at hearing that Ellen May asked for her help just the day before. Boyd and Ava confront Colt about the Ellen May situation, although he maintains that he killed her. He is then ordered to find Cassie. Colt leaves after injecting himself, unaware that Tim is following him. After a prostitute warns him, Johnny (David Meunier) confesses to Boyd and Ava that Ellen May is alive and that he extorted Colt for money in exchange for his silence.

Colt confronts Cassie at the Last Chance Holiness Church, where he chokes her when she doesn't reveal Ellen May's location. Tim arrives and holds him at gunpoint and they prepare for a showdown when Boyd arrives and convinces Colt to leave with him. Meanwhile, Raylan defuses a situation with Bob (Patton Oswalt) and the two Clover Hillers, who are shacked up with guns after a couple of their friends were killed by the Detroit mob. Raylan manages to end the situation without anyone getting hurt. Raylan finds out that Shelby took the blame for Mosley taking down a Crowder. Alone with Mosley, Shelby is revealed to be Drew Thompson and thanks Mosley for keeping his secret. Shelby/Drew Thompson steals a car and leaves, while instead of running Mosley stays behind in Raylan's car.

Boyd confronts Colt about Ellen May, asking for details about her "execution". Boyd then targets his gun at Colt, telling him he knows he lied. He pulls the trigger but there are no bullets. Colt then says that Shelby knows about the situation and Boyd expresses disappointment. Mosley is no longer of any use to the Mafia because the Marshals now know who Drew Thompson is, setting up a chase between lawmen and criminals to find Shelby first. Boyd goes to Shelby's house to find out how much Shelby knows about Ellen May, only to find the Marshals there. Boyd, disgusted, realizes Shelby is Drew Thompson.

== Production ==
=== Development ===
In February 2013, it was reported that the ninth episode of the fourth season would be titled "The Hatchet Tour", and was to be directed by Lesli Linka Glatter and written by supervising producer Taylor Elmore and Leonard Chang.

=== Writing ===
Series developer Graham Yost previewed that the season's mystery arc would conclude on the episode, from which its actions would impact the remainder of the season. The episode reveals the identity of Drew Thompson, turning out to be Shelby Parlow, played by Jim Beaver since the second season. The writers came up with the idea while working on the episode "Kin". Among the many possibilities, the writers considered making Drew Thompson a Clover Hill citizen or making Josiah Cairn the real Drew Thompson. Producer Benjamin Cavell then came up with the idea of Shelby being Drew, which interested the writers. Yost said, "We liked the idea of a guy who was on the run from the law working as a sheriff's deputy for years and then becoming the sheriff. That was partly suggested by something that [EP Fred Golan] had read about, a guy was running for Congress and then it was found out he was living under a stolen identity. Then it became a balancing."

== Reception ==
=== Viewers ===
In its original American broadcast, "The Hatchet Tour" was seen by an estimated 2.32 million household viewers and gained a 0.9 ratings share among adults aged 18–49, according to Nielsen Media Research. This means that 0.9 percent of all households with televisions watched the episode. This was a 6% increase in viewership from the previous episode, which was watched by 2.18 million viewers with a 0.8 in the 18-49 demographics.

=== Critical reviews ===
"The Hatchet Tour" received extremely positive reviews from critics. Seth Amitin of IGN gave the episode a "great" 8.7 out of 10 and wrote, "'The Hatchet Tour' was a good episode. It wasn't as great as last week, but it was above average and it kept the season arc strong. The Drew Thompson story should get great in the next few episodes."

Noel Murray of The A.V. Club gave the episode a "B+" grade and wrote, "'The Hatchet Tour' is a putting-together-the-pieces episode, and thus a step down from last week's excellent Justified. But not a big step. It mainly suffers from some logical inconsistencies (perhaps), and from its necessary but none-too-exciting function of giving the characters information that we viewers have either already been told or had figured out on our own. Thankfully, while all of that's going on, 'The Hatchet Tour' is also digging deeper into what this season is really about: not the identity of Drew Thompson, but how the tangled history of Harlan's many family feuds continues to influence the lives of Raylan Givens and Boyd Crowder." Kevin Fitzpatrick of Screen Crush wrote, "Even without the big reveal, 'The Hatchet Tour' makes for another outstanding installment of the season as both Boyd and Raylan are sent somewhat off the rails in their respective quests, finding ample story for Tim as well. We're not quite sure what to expect from the final four episodes of the season, but Justified gets us more and more on the hook each week. Who needs big bads?"

Alan Sepinwall of HitFix wrote, "Mostly, though, I'm interested in seeing what comes next, now that everyone knows what Drew Thompson looks like 30 years later. It's a good use of Jim Beaver, even if it means he's all but certain to be off the show after this season." Rachel Larimore of Slate wrote, "The writers dropped so many hints to that effect in the previous episode that I was sure it was a feint."

Joe Reid of Vulture gave the episode a 4 star rating out of 5 and wrote, "It turned out that all the readers had figured it out weeks before. Cut to last week, in the Justified comments, when everybody had all come to the decision that Shelby was obviously Drew Thompson, and I once again realized that this was a parlor game that I should've been playing all season. This episode ends that particular game and gets us good and set up for the end run of the season." Dan Forcella of TV Fanatic gave the episode a 4.5 star rating out of 5 and wrote, "Overall, it was a well-woven story and a great episode. I'm giving it 4.5 shots of Bourbon for answering so many questions, yet creating so many more." Jack McKinney of Paste gave the episode a 9.1 out of 10 rating and wrote, "Despite a lack of violent action, plot point for plot point, this episode was a non-stop rollercoaster ride. While Drew has been unmasked, a new mystery has cropped up. What the hell is the show going to be about for four more hours this season?"
