= This Bird Has Flown (Justified) =

- Justified episode
- Episode no.: Season 4 Episode 4
- Directed by: Bill Johnson
- Written by: Taylor Elmore
- Cinematography by: Francis Kenny
- Editing by: Steve Polivka
- Original air date: January 29, 2013
- Running time: 39 minutes

Guest appearances
- Ron Eldard as Colton "Colt" Rhodes; Robert Baker as Randall Kusik; Jim Beaver as Sheriff Shelby Parlow; David Dean Bottrell as Alvin; Josh Close as Joe Hoppus; Jenn Lyon as Lindsey Salazar; David Meunier as Johnny Crowder; Abby Miller as Ellen May; Lindsay Pulsipher as Cassie St. Cyr; Paul Rae as Patterson Gaines; Navi Rawat as Gina

Episode chronology
← Previous "Truth and Consequences"	Next → "Kin"
- Justified (season 4)

"This Bird Has Flown" is the fourth episode of the fourth season of the American Neo-Western television series Justified. It is the 43rd overall episode of the series and was written by supervising producer Taylor Elmore and directed by Bill Johnson. It originally aired on FX on January 29, 2013.

The series is based on Elmore Leonard's stories about the character Raylan Givens, particularly "Fire in the Hole", which serves as the basis for the episode. The series follows Raylan Givens, a tough deputy U.S. Marshal enforcing his own brand of justice. The series revolves around the inhabitants and culture in the Appalachian Mountains area of eastern Kentucky, specifically Harlan County where many of the main characters grew up. In the episode, Raylan searches for Lindsey and Randall after they steal his money. Meanwhile, Ava and Boyd start wondering what to do with Ellen May, who now wants to work with them again.

According to Nielsen Media Research, the episode was seen by an estimated 2.08 million household viewers and gained a 0.9 ratings share among adults aged 18–49. The episode received generally positive reviews from critics, who praised the performances but some expressed frustration with the episode's pace and lack of character development.

== Plot ==
Raylan (Timothy Olyphant) and Rachel (Erica Tazel) are surveying Raylan's tossed apartment. Meanwhile, Lindsay (Jenn Lyon) and Randall (Robert Baker) go to visit sleazy fight promoter Joe Hoppus (Josh Close), who after a tense exchange agrees to set Randall up as a manager of fighters.

Following Billy's death, Ellen May (Abby Miller) returns to the bar. Boyd (Walton Goggins) and Ava (Joelle Carter) are skeptical of her intentions, and fear she may have confessed anything to Cassie (Lindsay Pulsipher). Boyd sends Colt (Ron Eldard) to investigate. Raylan and Rachel show up at Hoppus's house the next morning, finding a wrecked backyard full of hungover party goers and Hoppus in a three-way with a couple of prostitutes. Hoppus imparts that Randall was looking to get into the business of fighting chickens, and gives Raylan the name of the farmer that he was headed to see.

Cassie is brought to Sheriff Shelby (Jim Beaver), who warns her that Boyd may kill her. Cassie is scared but does not reveal anything vital about him. Unknown to her, Boyd listened to the conversation. Ava is still convinced that Ellen May will speak and suggests killing her. Boyd refuses to do this and decides to send her down to Alabama, where his cousin Lonnie runs a motel and bar. Ellen May can work for Lonnie and have a shot at a decent life.

Randall and Lindsey stop for gas, and Randall steals a bottle of beer while Lindsey distracts the cashier. Randall gets angry because he thinks the cashier was flirting with Lindsey, and goes back to beat him up. Lindsey then calls Raylan from a pay phone. Raylan later questions the badly beaten cashier. Raylan learns where Lindsey and Randall are headed and finds them on a horse farm. He shoots Randall with a non-lethal beanbag gun and questions Lindsey, but Randall regains his strength and attacks him. Raylan and Randall fight until Lindsey gets the beanbag gun, shoots both of them, and then knocks Randall out with the butt of the gun. Raylan comes to his senses to find Lindsey gone. Raylan detains Randall, but learns that he and Lindsey had already spent Raylan's money on a van full of fighting chickens.

Boyd assigns Colt to take Ellen May to Alabama. However, Ellen May inadvertently mentions Ava's murder of Delroy in a crowded hallway, with several people nearby, Boyd orders Colt to kill her. Colt, acting as though he is taking Ellen May to the bus station, stops at a gas station to check his .45 and snort some heroin in the restroom. When he goes back outside, he discovers Ellen May has disappeared.

== Production ==
=== Development ===
In January 2013, it was reported that the fourth episode of the fourth season would be titled "This Bird Has Flown", and was to be directed by Bill Johnson and written by supervising producer Taylor Elmore.

=== Writing ===
Lindsey's actions in the previous episode were teased to play a pivotal role in the episode. Series developer Graham Yost previewed that Colt's actions at the end of the episode would heavily impact the rest of the season. About Ellen May's storyline and the last scene, Yost said, "We had dark versions where Ellen May didn't survive, where that was it, they were going to drive off and we would know that she was going to her death. Because part of it for us was simply the idea of how dark will Ava go. It's an easier decision for Boyd, 'cause he's lived that life for a long time, but it's not an easy one for Ava, and there will be ramifications. And then, we just came up with the idea of what if Ellen May gets away, and then how did that happen?"

=== Casting ===
Despite being credited, Nick Searcy and Jacob Pitts do not appear in the episode as their respective characters.

== Reception ==
=== Viewers ===
In its original American broadcast, "This Bird Has Flown" was seen by an estimated 2.08 million household viewers and gained a 0.9 ratings share among adults aged 18–49, according to Nielsen Media Research. This means that 0.9 percent of all households with televisions watched the episode. This was a 15% decrease in viewership from the previous episode, which was watched by 2.44 million viewers with a 1.0 in the 18-49 demographics.

=== Critical reviews ===
"This Bird Has Flown" received generally positive reviews from critics. Seth Amitin of IGN gave the episode a "good" 7 out of 10 and wrote, "While this episode put a neat little bow on the Randall story -- awesome research into the cockfighting too -- it didn't do it the way that Justified does best: have fun with the characters in a process that builds and broils the bigger arcs into a crescendo. In other words, we're missing that moment from last year when Quarles spoke with Boyd."

Scott Tobias of The A.V. Club gave the episode an "A−" grade and wrote, "Even though this episode is sadly devoid of Art and Tim, it's another very good Justified episode, with real moment-to-moment tension, driven by the ambiguity over what these characters will choose. 'This Bird Has Flown' sports more thematic unity than the average Justified, in that it's all about those fateful choices: the ones the characters make unwittingly and the ones being made on their behalf." Kevin Fitzpatrick of Screen Crush wrote, "We were glad to have a bit of revolution to Randall and Lindsey however, even if it makes the episode something of a side-quest. Hopefully, 'The Bird Has Flown' will prove only the close of act 1, with more heightened drama to go on as Justified season 4 continues."

Alan Sepinwall of HitFix wrote, "'This Bird Has Flown' probably wasn't as compelling as some of the other season 4 episodes so far, if only because I don't really care about Lindsey one way or the other. I haven't minded her in the past, but nor have I felt a need to see more of her in the way that, say, Joelle Carter popped off the screen as Ava back in season 1. Ultimately, though, I think the episode worked because it didn't really hinge on that question of where her loyalties lay." Rachel Larimore of Slate wrote, "It's not always easy for a comedy to be dramatic or a drama to be funny. But while Justified is most definitely a drama, its understated comic moments endear the characters to the viewers — a testament to its Elmore Leonard pedigree."

Mandl Blerly of Entertainment Weekly wrote, "What's fun about this episode — besides Raylan's ultimate showdown with Randall and Lindsey when he found them — is how it ended. We thought we knew exactly what was going to happen to Ellen May after Colton got the call from Ava to kill her instead of taking her to the bus station." Joe Reid of Vulture gave the episode a 4 star rating out of 5 and wrote, "'This Bird Has Flown' had that same multiplicity of tones, with the gravity of the Ellen May stuff, and even Raylan's semisweet sadness over Lindsey's betrayal, undercut by the essential silliness of the fact that in the end, Randall and Lindsey's crime spree was all about chickens. The drawback, unfortunately, was that I was having a real hard time buying Randall from one scene to the next. Robert Baker's not a bad actor, but his shifts from 'badass' to 'chicken-eyed dreamer' and back again felt more like inconsistency than elasticity."

Dan Forcella of TV Fanatic gave the episode a 4 star rating out of 5 and wrote, "Never has Justified ran at a pace this fast. After 'This Bird Has Flown' we are only five episodes into season four, but it feels more like an entire year's worth of story has already passed." Jack McKinney of Paste gave the episode an 8.7 out of 10 rating and wrote, "Not only does this episode wrap up the Badlands-esque Randall and Lindsay plotline, it makes an important statement about the nature of this season. Unlike past years, this season is going to be more multi-episodic in nature, with shorter, smaller plots that wrap up in a few episodes rather than one giant season-long arc. So far, this new tack is paying dividends."
