= Peace of Mind (Justified) =

- Justified episode
- Episode no.: Season 4 Episode 12
- Directed by: Gwyneth Horder-Payton
- Written by: Taylor Elmore & Leonard Chang
- Cinematography by: Francis Kenny
- Editing by: Keith Henderson
- Original air date: March 26, 2013
- Running time: 39 minutes

Guest appearances
- Jim Beaver as Drew Thompson; Ron Eldard as Colton "Colt" Rhodes; Daniel Buran as Nicky Cush; Rick Gomez as AUSA David Vasquez; John Kapelos as Picker; Jesse Luken as Jimmy Tolan; David Meunier as Johnny Crowder; Abby Miller as Ellen May; Mike O'Malley as Nick "Nicky" Augustine; Lindsay Pulsipher as Cassie St. Cyr; Mykelti Williamson as Ellstin Limehouse; Natalie Zea as Winona Hawkins

Episode chronology
| ← Previous "Decoy" | Next → "Ghosts" |
- Justified (season 4)

"Peace of Mind" is the twelfth episode of the fourth season of the American Neo-Western television series Justified. It is the 51st overall episode of the series and was written by supervising producer Taylor Elmore and Leonard Chang and directed by Gwyneth Horder-Payton. It originally aired on FX on March 26, 2013.

The series is based on Elmore Leonard's stories about the character Raylan Givens, particularly "Fire in the Hole", which serves as the basis for the episode. The series follows Raylan Givens, a tough deputy U.S. Marshal enforcing his own brand of justice. The series revolves around the inhabitants and culture in the Appalachian Mountains area of eastern Kentucky, specifically Harlan County where many of the main characters grew up. In the episode, Drew Thompson refuses to settle a WITSEC deal until Ellen May is found safe. It's a race between Raylan and Boyd to find Ellen May first.

According to Nielsen Media Research, the episode was seen by an estimated 2.44 million household viewers and gained a 0.8 ratings share among adults aged 18–49. The episode received critical acclaim, with critics praising the episode's building momentum, pace and unexpected ending.

== Plot ==
Raylan (Timothy Olyphant) talks with Winona (Natalie Zea) on the phone, who tells him that their child will be a girl. Art (Nick Searcy) congratulates him on catching Drew Thompson (Jim Beaver) but he is still forced to suspend Raylan for the amount of misdeeds he committed. Drew tells the Marshals he will refuse his deal for WITSEC unless he knows that Ellen May (Abby Miller) is safe.

Augustine (Mike O'Malley) tells Johnny (David Meunier) that Theo Tonin has heard from his informants that Drew won't enter protective custody to testify against Tonin unless Ellen May is safe. The Detroit mobsters figure they can use Ellen May to deter Drew from testifying. Augustine gets Johnny to help retrieve Ellen May. Johnny calls Limehouse (Mykelti Williamson), but Limehouse refuses to cooperate and they deduce he already made a deal with Boyd (Walton Goggins). Augustine then offers to give Boyd $300,000 to buy back Ellen May since Johnny can't get it done. In exchange for Ellen May, Augustine will hand over Johnny.

Raylan convinces Art to let him continue working on finding Ellen May but he is forced to take Tim (Jacob Pitts) and Rachel (Erica Tazel) with him. They go to Limehouse's holler where Limehouse denies Ellen May is on the property, but dares them to search in every property. Ava (Joelle Carter), who snuck in through a back entrance, offers the $300,000 to Limehouse, but he tells Ava he released Ellen May. Instead of taking money for Ellen May, Limehouse determines it is in his best interest to let Ellen May go (instead of taking money) to avoid extra heat from the Marshals, maintain his reputation as a protector of women in trouble, and also to avoid potential armed confrontation with Boyd and the Detroit mobsters.

Ellen May has taken shelter with her friend Nicky Cush (Daniel Buran) at his house. Boyd, Augustine and Picker (John Kapelos) arrive at the house but they are cornered by Cush wearing a body armor and targeting them with a gun. Boyd shoots him on the foot but they find Ellen May is not at the house. Cush confesses Ellen May is at Last Chance Holiness Church. Boyd reveals this information on the phone to his associates at the bar but Raylan got there first and heard him confirm the location. At the church, Ava gets there first and overhears Ellen May confessing Delroy's murder to Cassie (Lindsay Pulsipher), as well as her participation in the disposal of his body. Ava finds herself unable to kill Ellen May, so Boyd instead instructs Colt (Ron Eldard) to do the deed.

Tim arrives at the church just as Colt prepares to kill Ellen May. Tim confronts Colt about killing Mark, which he doesn't deny. Colt then decides to "call it quits" and raises his gun, causing Tim to shoot him in self-defense, killing him. Boyd and Ava decide their last play is to move and hide Delroy's body to avoid incrimination now that Ellen May is in custody. Ellen May reunites with Drew Thompson on the Marshal's office. Later, a delivery man sets up a rocking chair for Winona. The last shot of the episode is of the delivery man, who turns out to be Picker.

== Production ==
=== Development ===
In March 2013, it was reported that the twelfth episode of the fourth season would be titled "Peace of Mind", and was to be directed by Gwyneth Horder-Payton and written by supervising producer Taylor Elmore and Leonard Chang.

=== Writing ===
The episode marked the final appearance of Jim Beaver in the series. Beaver said, "I was a little surprised myself, not in terms of what they did do, but what they didn't do. I knew they were trying to find a way to keep my character alive. I know that was always their impulse. I don't know whether that means it's because they want to come back to him eventually, though. They've never said anything like that." Series developer Graham Yost expressed satisfaction at the closure of the storyline, saying "We had our concerns going in, whether doing a mystery season would work. You look at the struggles of other shows, whether it was Twin Peaks or The Killing, and it's not an easy thing to do. How much information do you give out? How far do you advance the story? There has to be something or the audience isn't satisfied, and if there's too much then we’ve blown it. We knew that would be a struggle, but we feel that it all came together."

On choosing the gender on Raylan's and Winona's baby, series developer Graham Yost said, "The argument in favor of a boy is Raylan's whole deal about being the son of a father — how would that be directly passed on or not on in his relationship with a boy. And then we just thought everyone's expecting that, wouldn't it be more interesting if it was a girl? When he said earlier on in the season, 'We don’t know if it's a boy, maybe the nonsense will end now if it's a girl' — we hadn't decided at that point. It also just set up that nice exchange between Raylan and Winona with him saying, 'I don’t know sh– about girls', and her saying something to the effect of, 'Oh, that's so sweet that you think that that's surprising.'"

== Reception ==
=== Viewers ===
In its original American broadcast, "Peace of Mind" was seen by an estimated 2.44 million household viewers and gained a 0.8 ratings share among adults aged 18–49, according to Nielsen Media Research. This means that 0.8 percent of all households with televisions watched the episode. This was a slight decrease in viewership from the previous episode, which was watched by 2.45 million viewers with a 0.9 in the 18-49 demographics.

=== Critical reviews ===
"Peace of Mind" received critical acclaim. Seth Amitin of IGN gave the episode a "great" 8.7 out of 10 and wrote, "This is the nuts and bolts stuff that makes Justified so attractive, and it's been on a roll the last few episodes. The whole Who's Gonna Get Drew Thompson game was good ol'-country-boy-havin' fun, and we were left guessing until the very end. It was supremely written, almost a textbook entrant into how to write a mystery game into a full season. Whatever was lacking in terms of physical action this episode was made up for with some brilliant on-screen plot movement."

Noel Murray of The A.V. Club gave the episode an "A" grade and wrote, "'Peace Of Mind' is a different kind of episode than last week's 'Decoy', with fewer first-pumping moments and more soul-searching. But it's just as good in its way. It's a similar adventure, with a shift in focus." Kevin Fitzpatrick of Screen Crush wrote, "No Justified fan likely expected 'Peace of Mind' to live up to the thrilling excitement of last week's 'Decoy', but tonight's episode should make for a fine palate cleanser in time for whatever the season finale has in store next week."

Alan Sepinwall of HitFix wrote, "It was going to be virtually impossible for Justified to top, or even equal, the enormous barrel of fun that was 'Decoy', which featured every aspect of the show, and every character, operating at peak value. But if 'Peace of Mind' couldn't hit that level, it did a fine job of moving the story forward, and wisely went for a different tone. 'Decoy' was all smiles and joy; 'Peace of Mind' was contemplative and full of dread, and it worked quite well." Rachel Larimore of Slate wrote, "After two very intense episodes, I thought we might get a breather for this last episode before the finale, but the writers still packed in a lot."

Joe Reid of Vulture gave the episode a 4 star rating out of 5 and wrote, "I'm glad the show played it straight with Ava, didn't swerve away from that choice just because we could all see it coming. There's a degree to which the show allowed itself to have its cake and eat it too, with Ava making the decision to spare Ellen May, only to have first Colt and then Tim step in to take over the gunplay." Dan Forcella of TV Fanatic gave the episode a 4.5 star rating out of 5 and wrote, "After the thrilling events of last week's 'Decoy', Justified took its foot off the pedal just a bit to showcase the more subtle brilliance of this show in what has turned out to be another fantastic season. Six weeks ago I posited that Colton's entire arc might have been out of place. 'Peace of Mind', and the past few episodes overall, proved me wrong." Jack McKinney of Paste gave the episode a 9.2 out of 10 and wrote, "I never thought I would say this about Justified, but on some level I am really not looking forward to next week's finale. What can I say? We all have tough choices to make."
