= Justified season 4 =

Justified
- Season 4
- Season 4 DVD cover
- No. of episodes: 13

Release
- Original network: FX
- Original release: January 8 – April 2, 2013

Season chronology
- ← Previous; Season 3 Next → Season 5

The fourth season of the American neo-Western television series Justified premiered on January 8, 2013, on FX, and concluded on April 2, 2013, consisting of 13 episodes. The series was developed by Graham Yost based on Elmore Leonard's novels Pronto and Riding the Rap and his short story "Fire in the Hole". Its main character is Raylan Givens, a deputy U.S. Marshal. Timothy Olyphant portrays Givens, a tough federal lawman, enforcing his own brand of justice in his Kentucky hometown. The series is set in the city of Lexington, Kentucky, and the hill country of eastern Kentucky, specifically in and around Harlan.

== Cast and characters ==
=== Main ===
- Timothy Olyphant as Raylan Givens, a suave deputy U.S. marshal who discovers a bag in his father's house that is tied to a decades-old mystery.
- Nick Searcy as Art Mullen, the chief deputy of Lexington's marshals office.
- Joelle Carter as Ava Crowder, Boyd's lover who begins to fear for her safety when a past crime risks being exposed.
- Jacob Pitts as Tim Gutterson, a Lexington deputy marshal whose friend gets in trouble and forces him to intervene.
- Erica Tazel as Rachel Brooks, a Lexington deputy marshal.
- Walton Goggins as Boyd Crowder, Raylan's intelligent nemesis who is torn between protecting Ava and moving up in the criminal world.

=== Recurring ===
- Ron Eldard as Colton "Colt" Rhodes, a Gulf War veteran and ex-military police associate of Boyd's who comes to Harlan looking for work.
- David Meunier as Johnny Crowder, Boyd's deceitful and disabled cousin.
- Jim Beaver as Shelby Parlow, Harlan's sheriff who harbors a destructive secret.
- Abby Miller as Ellen May, a prostitute who works for Ava and tries to go straight.
- Jere Burns as Wynn Duffy, a volatile and dangerous Dixie Mafia enforcer.
- Jonathan Kowalsky as Mike Cosmatopolis, Duffy's bodyguard.
- Lindsay Pulsipher as Cassie St. Cyr, Billy's sister who manages their church.
- Jesse Luken as Jimmy Tolan, Boyd's henchman.
- Mike O'Malley as Nick Augustine, the hot-headed underboss of the Detroit mob who comes to Harlan after the resurfacing of an old enemy.
- Brian Howe as Arnold, a client of Ellen May's and a member of the Clover Hillers, an elite society of Harlan businessmen.
- Sam Anderson as Lee Paxton, a funeral home director and a member of the Clover Hillers, an elite criminal society of Harlan businessmen.
- Raymond J. Barry as Arlo Givens, Raylan's imprisoned father who refuses to talk to his son.
- William Gregory Lee as Nick Mooney, one of Parlow's deputies.
- Jenn Lyon as Lindsey Salazar, Raylan's bartender girlfriend whose criminal past resurfaces.
- Patton Oswalt as Bob Sweeney, Harlan's good-natured and unimposing constable.
- Robert Baker as Randall Kusik, Lindsey's criminal ex-husband whose temper puts him at odds with Raylan.
- Rick Gomez as David Vasquez, an assistant U.S. attorney.
- John Kapelos as Ethan Picker, a Detroit Mob henchman who works under Augustine.
- Joseph Mazzello as Billy St. Cyr, a traveling Signs preacher who comes to Harlan and opposes Boyd.
- Natalie Zea as Winona Hawkins, Raylan's pregnant ex-wife.
- Julia Campbell as Eve Munro, the widow of a supposedly long-dead criminal.
- Chris Chalk as Jody Adair, a Knoxville-based fugitive whom Raylan is tasked with capturing.
- Gerald McRaney as Josiah Cairn, the abusive stepfather of a local petty criminal who tasks her with burglarizing Arlo's house.
- Brent Sexton as Hunter Mosley, Harlan's imprisoned former sheriff who goes to great lengths to protect an old secret.
- Mykelti Williamson as Ellstin Limehouse, a crime boss who becomes involved with Ellen May.

=== Guest ===
- David Andrews as Tillman Napier, Harlan's former sheriff who hosts elite swingers parties.
- Max Perlich as Sammy Tonin, the pushover son of the Detroit Mob's boss and the organization's heir.
- Stephen Tobolowsky as Jerry Barkley, an FBI agent who works for the Detroit Mob.

== Production ==
The fourth season of 13 episodes was announced on March 6, 2012.

=== Filming ===
Episodes were shot in California. The small town of Green Valley, California often doubles for Harlan, Kentucky.

== Episodes ==
No. overall	No. in season	Title	Directed by	Written by	Original release date	US viewers (millions)
40	1	"Hole in the Wall"	Michael Dinner	Graham Yost	January 8, 2013	3.59
In 1983, a man falls from a plane to his death. In the present, Raylan arrests fugitive Jody Adair and puts him in the trunk of his car as a favor to bondswoman Sharon Edmunds. Teen criminal Roz finds a bag in the wall of Arlo Givens's abandoned house, but she is chased away by Harlan constable Bob Sweeney and steals Raylan's car. He and Bob track the car to a junkyard, where Roz and Jody attack them, though they disarm them and Raylan re-arrests Jody. Raylan finds an ID for "Waldo Truth" in the bag and asks an imprisoned Arlo about it, who says nothing. A drug dealer working for Boyd finds religion through traveling Signs preacher Billy St. Cyr. Ex-military police officer and old friend of Boyd's, Colt Rhodes, comes to Harlan and begins working as his enforcer. Colt kills the dealer when he misunderstands Boyd's orders. Arlo kills a prisoner who states intent to look into the bag.
41	2	"Where's Waldo?"	Bill Johnson	Dave Andron	January 15, 2013	2.45
Ellen May joins Billy's congregation, and Boyd realizes his sister Cassie is running things while confronting him. He catches one of Duffy's men dealing heroin on his territory and tries to leverage this for a partnership with the Dixie Mafia, but Duffy kills the man to avoid this. Raylan and Art meet Truth, only to realize he is a man paid by Truth's widow to pose as him so his family could cash his welfare checks. She explains that the day the real Truth disappeared, he left with a fugitive named Drew Thompson, who authorities believed was the man who fell from the plane. Art realizes from a scar on Truth's body that Thompson used him to fake his death. Lindsey Salazar's (Note: A bartender at the High Note and Raylan's girlfriend, first seen in "The Man Behind the Curtain".) ex-husband Randall Kusik comes to the High Note to see her.
42	3	"Truth and Consequences"	Jon Avnet	Benjamin Cavell	January 22, 2013	2.44
Boyd sends Colt and his man Jimmy Tolan to attack the St. Cyrs, but the latter is bitten by snakes left out for them. When he does not die, Boyd realizes Cassie has been milking Billy's snakes of their venom and reveals this before the congregation. Humiliated, Billy takes his offer of an unsafe snake, being bitten and dying. Lindsey explains to Raylan that she and Randall used to run criminal scams together, which he went to jail for while she reformed. Raylan talks to Thompson's widow, but she is kidnapped by a Detroit man while he is distracted by a corrupt FBI agent. Raylan forces her location out of the agent, who commits suicide after giving it up. The marshals rescue her before she can be tortured for Thompson's location, and she explains that Thompson told her he was going to die after seeing Theo Tonin kill a federal witness. Raylan returns to his apartment to find his money stolen and Lindsey gone.
43	4	"This Bird Has Flown"	Bill Johnson	Taylor Elmore	January 29, 2013	2.08
Randall and Lindsey plan to get into cockfighting with Raylan's money. Lindsey calls Raylan after Randall beats a cashier who was flirting with her, and he intercepts them and fights Randall. Lindsey incapacitates them both and leaves, while Raylan learns that the couple already spent his money. Ellen May returns to Audrey's, but Ava wants to have her killed to prevent anyone else knowing about the murder of Delroy Baker, (Note: As depicted in "Loose Ends".) which Boyd is against until Ellen May mentions Delroy's murder in public. He instructs Colt to kill her, but when he stops at a gas station to do heroin, she vanishes.
44	5	"Kin"	Peter Werner	Fred Golan & VJ Boyd	February 5, 2013	2.42
Colt sees Ellen May being approached by a police car on security footage while telling Boyd that he killed her as ordered, while Shelby Parlow hides her from Colt. Jerry Barkley, working for Detroit underboss Nick Augustine, is killed by him after the marshals take the Thompson case from the FBI. Augustine orders Duffy to find Thompson, who asks Boyd to do it. Roz tells Raylan that her stepfather Josiah Cairn sent her to find the bag. He tells Raylan that Thompson injured himself jumping from the plane, so Arlo and Bo Crowder sent him to the "hill people." Raylan and Boyd are captured upon going to them separately, but Raylan saves them by calling for his mother's cousin amongst them. She lets them go and claims Thompson no longer lives with them. Raylan goes to see Josiah, but only find his severed foot and ankle monitor.
45	6	"Foot Chase"	Peter Werner	Dave Andron & Ingrid Escajeda	February 12, 2013	2.30
Raylan and Parlow track down Roz, who explains that men abducted Josiah and cut off his foot to neutralize his monitor. Arlo turns out to be the one who had Josiah captured by telling his lawyer that he was Thompson. Raylan and Parlow rescue him, and he reveals that Hunter Mosley (Note: Harlan's imprisoned former sheriff, first seen in "The Lord of War and Thunder".) knows who Thompson is. Colt beats up Johnny Crowder's favorite prostitute Teri, believing she has Ellen May's location, and she blames it on one of her clients when Johnny questions her. He and Colt brutalize the man. Wanting to find information on Thompson, Ava pressures Ellen May's client into getting her and Boyd invited to Tillman Napier's elite swingers party. Boyd proposes to her and she accepts.
46	7	"Money Trap"	Don Kurt	Story by : Elmore Leonard & Chris Provenzano; Teleplay by : Chris Provenzano	February 19, 2013	2.15
A flashback shows Jody escaping from Edmunds and killing her. Her body is found in the present, and Jody attacks his ex-wife's friend while trying to find her. Raylan rescues the woman, and Jody confronts him at the High Note where Raylan kills him. Johnny realizes that Colt beat up Teri and failed to kill Ellen May. At Napier's party, Boyd meets the Clover Hillers, an elite society of Harlan businessmen who control the county's criminal economy, including Boyd's ventures. They order him to kill Black Pike Coal owner Frank Browning. Raylan decides to talk to Hunter when Arlo refuses to give up Thompson.
47	8	"Outlaw"	John Dahl	Benjamin Cavell & Keith Schreier	February 26, 2013	2.18
Raylan offers Hunter a deal, but he deduces that Arlo was offered the same deal and stabs him. A dying Arlo refuses to reveal Thompson's identity to Raylan. Colt is blackmailed by Ellen May, so he robs and murders a drug dealer, killing Tim's addict friend Mark for witnessing it. He leaves the money at a drop-off spot, which Johnny, actually the one who contacted him, collects. When Browning refuses to pay Boyd for protection, he tells Theo that both Browning and a Clover Hiller could be Thompson. Theo sends a hitman that kills them both, but the hitman goes to kill Boyd when he learns of his deception. Raylan intercepts the hitman and kills him. Boyd convinces Augustine to work with him over Duffy. When the Clover Hillers confront Boyd, he reveals he had Detroit dismantle their organizations and extorts them. Arlo dies and Raylan contemplates his corpse in a morgue.
48	9	"The Hatchet Tour"	Lesli Linka Glatter	Taylor Elmore & Leonard Chang	March 5, 2013	2.32
Tim realizes that Colt killed Mark based on a text he sent before he died, stopping Colt from hurting Cassie when she comes looking for Ellen May. Johnny tells Boyd about the situation with Colt, who he forces to admit the truth about Ellen May and that he went to Parlow looking for her. While taking Hunter to a supermax, Raylan presses him for Thompson's identity, only for Hunter to escape the car and attempt suicide. Raylan recovers him and Parlow joins them, only for them to be waylaid by Bob getting in a gunfight with the Clover Hillers. As Raylan defuses it, Parlow thanks Hunter, who addresses him as "Drew". Bob mentions that Parlow once took responsibility for Hunter killing a Crowder, and Raylan runs outside to find that Thompson stole Bob's car. Boyd goes to Thompson's house to find the marshals searching it, realizing his identity.
49	10	"Get Drew"	Billy Gierhart	Dave Andron & VJ Boyd	March 12, 2013	2.40
With the only airfield out of Harlan being watched, Ellen May and Thompson go to Ellstin Limehouse, who decides to capture and sell them. Boyd agrees to buy them both, planning to upsell Thompson to Detroit, only for Limehouse to up his price when Boyd arrives. While he wants to take Ellen May to protect Ava, she convinces him to buy Thompson. Colt restrains Thompson in a field for Augustine to pick up, only for the marshals, alerted by Johnny, to arrive just in time and rescue him.
50	11	"Decoy"	Michael Watkins	Graham Yost & Chris Provenzano	March 19, 2013	2.45
Boyd convinces a furious Augustine to let him help find Thompson. While Tim and Art distract Colt and Detroit men with a decoy convoy, Thompson, Raylan, and Rachel hole up in Arlo's house, where Thompson explains that he trusted Arlo to burn Truth's ID. They move, but Bob, having put motion detectors in the walls after Roz broke in, arrives after they leave. A Detroit henchman arrives and beats him for Thompson's location, but when he lets his guard down, Bob stabs him and kills him with his own gun before joining Raylan. Augustine reveals Johnny's deception to Ava. Detroit man Ethan Picker and his men go to kill Thompson, but Raylan reveals that he is already gone and the police are on their way. They leave, and Raylan tells Art that, at Bob's suggestion, Rachel and Thompson escaped Harlan by train.
51	12	"Peace of Mind"	Gwyneth Horder-Payton	Taylor Elmore & Leonard Chang	March 26, 2013	2.44
Thompson refuses to enter WITSEC until Ellen May is safe, which a Detroit mole relays to Augustine, who offers to give Boyd Johnny if he gets Ellen May. Ava confronts Limehouse, who reveals he already let Ellen May go to avoid conflict. Ellen May goes to the St. Cyr church. Raylan overhears Boyd telling Jimmy her location, so he sends Tim to get her, while Boyd sends Colt to kill her. Tim arrives just in time and kills him. While Ellen May goes into WITSEC with Thompson, Boyd and Ava decide to move Delroy's body before Ellen May can testify. Picker scopes out Winona's house.
52	13	"Ghosts"	Bill Johnson	Fred Golan & Benjamin Cavell	April 2, 2013	2.25
Raylan visits Winona and finds Augustine's men demanding he take them to Thompson. He kills them and, despite Art's warnings that he will be fired if he goes after Augustine, forces Boyd to arrange a meeting, where he tries to convince Augustine to turn himself in. He refuses and declares intent to kill Sammy Tonin and become Theo's successor. Raylan greets an arriving Sammy, having called him ahead of time, and allows Picker and his men to kill Augustine. The police find Delroy's body after receiving a tip, so Boyd waives the debt of Clover Hiller and funeral home director Lee Paxton so he can steal the body. Ava goes alone to dispose of it, only to be arrested by new sheriff Nick Mooney, the entire thing having been a setup by Paxton after the police were tipped by Cassie. Theo retires and Sammy takes over, who puts Duffy in charge of the region's operations. Duffy asks Boyd to distribute heroin in Harlan. Raylan repairs the hole in Arlo's wall as Art calls him to reveal Augustine's death, in which he does not admit any part.

== Reception ==
On Rotten Tomatoes, the season has an approval rating of 100% with an average score of 9.5 out of 10 based on 25 reviews. The website's critical consensus reads, "Bolstered by witty, efficient dialogue and confident storytelling, Justified makes a strong case for consideration among cable television's top dramas." On Metacritic, the season has a weighted average score of 90 out of 100, based on 14 critics, indicating "universal acclaim.

Tom Gliatto of People Weekly praised this season, writing: "What gives the show its kick is the gleefully childish lack of repentance shown by most of these rascals—countered by Olyphant's coolly amused control." Verne Gay of Newsday praised this season also, writing: "Character—as the old saying goes—is a long-standing habit, and their habits remain very much intact. The same could be said of Justified.", and Chuck Bowen of Slant Magazine praised this season, writing: "Justified is the strongest, liveliest, and most tonally accurate adaptation of the writer's work to date, and the latest season bracingly suggests that isn't likely to change anytime soon."

=== Ratings ===
The fourth season averaged 2.434 million viewers and a 0.9 rating in the 18–49 demographic.

== Home media release ==
The fourth season was released on Blu-ray and DVD in region 1 on December 17, 2013, in region 2 on August 12, 2013, and in region 4 on August 8, 2013. Special features on the season four set include ten audio commentaries by cast and crew, deleted scenes, five behind-the-scenes featurettes, and outtakes.
