= Outlaw (Justified) =

- Justified episode
- Episode no.: Season 4 Episode 8
- Directed by: John Dahl
- Written by: Benjamin Cavell & Keith Schreier
- Cinematography by: Francis Kenny
- Editing by: Harvey Rosenstock
- Original air date: February 26, 2013
- Running time: 46 minutes

Guest appearances
- Jim Beaver as Sheriff Shelby Parlow; Jere Burns as Wynn Duffy; Ron Eldard as Colton "Colt" Rhodes; Sam Anderson as Lee Paxton; Matthew John Armstrong as Hitman; Ned Bellamy as Gerald Johns; Julia Campbell as Eve Munro; Grainger Hines as Sam Keener; Brian Howe as Arnold; David Meunier as Johnny Crowder; Ian Reed Kesler as Mark; Abby Miller as Ellen May; Mike O'Malley as Nick "Nicky" Augustine; Michael Stoyanov as Dave; Brent Sexton as Hunter Mosley; Raymond J. Barry as Arlo Givens

Episode chronology
← Previous "Money Trap"	Next → "The Hatchet Tour"
- Justified (season 4)

"Outlaw" is the eighth episode of the fourth season of the American Neo-Western television series Justified. It is the 47th overall episode of the series and was written by producer Benjamin Cavell and writer's assistant Keith Schreier and directed by John Dahl. It originally aired on FX on February 26, 2013.

The series is based on Elmore Leonard's stories about the character Raylan Givens, particularly "Fire in the Hole", which serves as the basis for the episode. The series follows Raylan Givens, a tough deputy U.S. Marshal enforcing his own brand of justice. The series revolves around the inhabitants and culture in the Appalachian Mountains area of eastern Kentucky, specifically Harlan County where many of the main characters grew up. In the episode, Raylan questions former Sheriff Hunter Mosley about Drew Thompson's whereabouts. Meanwhile, Boyd is pressured by the Harlan elite to kill one of their members while Duffy is also impatient as Theo Tonin demands Drew Thompson's death.

According to Nielsen Media Research, the episode was seen by an estimated 2.18 million household viewers and gained a 0.8 ratings share among adults aged 18–49. The episode received critical acclaim from critics, who praised the writing, acting, and character development.

== Plot ==
Raylan (Timothy Olyphant) visits former Harlan County Sheriff Hunter Mosley (Brent Sexton) to ask about Drew Thompson. Raylan offers Mosley the same deal he gave Arlo (Raymond J. Barry), a transfer to a more comfortable prison. Despite Raylan not mentioning Arlo, Mosley deduces it was him. Instead of helping Raylan, Mosley decides to kill Arlo so that Mosley has more time to leverage his own information or protect Drew Thompson, not clear which. He does the deed in the prison barbershop, and after a struggle, Hunter stabs Arlo in the chest with a pair of scissors.

Raylan is questioning Eve Munro (Julia Campbell) when he is notified of Arlo's stabbing, with Mullen (Nick Searcy) indicating that Arlo may not survive the night. Meanwhile, Boyd (Walton Goggins) has been told by Gerald Johns (Ned Bellamy) to kill a man named Frank Browning (Rocky McMurray). Boyd meets with Frank so he could pay more to spare his life but Frank bluntly refuses and threatens his life with a shotgun, ordering him to leave. Boyd also meets with Duffy (Jere Burns), who says that Theo Tonin is growing impatient with the lack of progress on Drew Thompson. Boyd reduced his possible suspects to two and decides to spare time by killing both of them. The two men, Frank and Sam Keener (Grainger Hines), are killed at their houses by a hitman posing as a police officer (Matthew John Armstrong).

Colt (Ron Eldard) receives a text message from Ellen May (Abby Miller), who demands $20,000 for her silence. He visits his dealer, kills him and steals his money. However, he finds Mark (Ian Reed Kesler), Tim's (Jacob Pitts) former war colleague, in the apartment and is forced to kill him. Raylan visits Arlo in the infirmary to ask for Drew Thompson again but Arlo once again ruthlessly turns him down. He then meets with Shelby (Jim Beaver) after they discover the murders, and both deduce Boyd was involved as he visited Frank earlier that day. Johnny (David Meunier) meets with Duffy, who states that he got both Frank and Sam killed. However, Johnny says that the two dead men are not Drew Thompson, they are actually Boyd's enemies. Angered, Duffy tells Johnny he will be allowed to kill Boyd but Johnny himself must find Drew Thompson.

Raylan confronts Boyd at the bar, where the hitman posing as a police officer fakes arresting him on Shelby's orders, when he is actually planning to deliver him to Johnny and Duffy. Raylan sees through his act and when the hitman draws his gun out, Raylan kills him in front of Boyd and Ava (Joelle Carter). The next day, Colt goes to a park where he leaves the money per Ellen May's instructions. However, it's revealed that Johnny is behind the scheme. Boyd is contacted by Nicky Augustine (Mike O'Malley), and he offers himself to work for them in the search for Drew Thompson, which Nicky accepts.

At the Marshal's office, while discussing the events, Raylan casually drops that he received a call that Arlo died one hour ago. Mullen sends him on a one week leave although Raylan manages to reduce it to just two days. Boyd uses his association with the Tonins to strip the Clover Hillers' of their law contacts and power, in exchange for $100,000 from each Clover Hiller and a Dairy Queen franchise. Ava expresses concern about what Tonin may do if things go awry but Boyd assures her that he can handle it. The episode ends as Raylan visits Arlo's corpse in the morgue.

== Production ==
=== Development ===
In February 2013, it was reported that the eighth episode of the fourth season would be titled "Outlaw", and was to be directed by John Dahl and written by producer Benjamin Cavell and writer's assistant Keith Schreier.

=== Writing ===
The episode featured the death of Arlo Givens, played by Raymond J. Barry since the first season and a pivotal part of the series. On the decision of killing him off, series developer Graham Yost explained that the writers considered killing Arlo as far back on season 2. The writers felt inspired by the scene in the previous episode where Raylan visited Arlo in prison. Yost said, "Tim always loves the idea of Raylan doing things and them having unintended consequences." John Landgraf, Chairman of FX, contacted the writers about their decision, asking "Are you sure? Are you sure you want to do this? This is a big step." Yost responded, "Look, at the end of last season, we didn't think we would use Arlo at all this year. We felt that him shooting Tom Bergen thinking it could have been Raylan, that's it. We're done with him. Where else are we gonna go with him?"

Yost contacted actor Raymond J. Barry to notify him of his character's death, which was their first contact in the four seasons of the series. Barry said, "I kinda knew that I was hitting a dead-end, because I was in prison and they had killed my wife in the first three seasons, and I missed her. And Margo Martindale, with whom I've done three films, I'd been anticipating that we were gonna be doing a lot of work together but that didn't happen — they killed her, too. In both cases, the actresses were very skilled and really very, very interesting in the series and they got rid of them. And I think it was unpredictable. They seem to do that to keep people off-balance. It's in some ways a very clever approach: You don't want the woman to get killed, you want the guy to get killed, if there's a choice, particularly when there's a character like Arlo, who's not sweet and squeeze-y."

== Reception ==
=== Viewers ===
In its original American broadcast, "Outlaw" was seen by an estimated 2.18 million household viewers and gained a 0.8 ratings share among adults aged 18–49, according to Nielsen Media Research. This means that 0.8 percent of all households with televisions watched the episode. This was a slight increase in viewership from the previous episode, which was watched by 2.15 million viewers with a 0.8 in the 18-49 demographics.

=== Critical reviews ===
"Outlaw" received critical acclaim from critics. Seth Amitin of IGN gave the episode an "amazing" 9.2 out of 10 and wrote, "This episode was wonderfully rich, but understated. It had some humor in it with a big heart-breaking ending. Season 4 has a direction now and it's looking pretty good."

Zack Handlen of The A.V. Club gave the episode an "A−" grade and wrote, "'Outlaw' is an improvement over the last couple of Justified, and one of the best of the season, held up only by one hiccup in the master-plot that I'll get to later." Kevin Fitzpatrick of Screen Crush wrote, "It will be interesting to see what Justified does with Raylan on his brief leave to recover from Arlo's death, but 'Outlaw' still proves just the shot in the arm that Justified season 4 needed going forward. Dairy Queen manager Boyd for the win!"

Alan Sepinwall of HitFix wrote, "I ultimately think the show did itself and its main character a disservice by having the death of Arlo get swept up in the usual chaos of Drew Thompson, Theo Tonin, Shelby, Ellen May, strip-searching drug dealers, etc." Rachel Larimore of Slate wrote, "Even by Justified's action-packed standards, 'Outlaw' was a busy episode. Arlo died. Boyd climbed on Wynn Duffy's shoulders and then kicked him in the head on the way up the criminal kingpin career ladder. Then Raylan took out an assassin and saved Boyd's life. Oh, and five or six other people died. In fact, it felt more like the penultimate episode of a season, not something from the middle."

Joe Reid of Vulture gave the episode a perfect 5 star rating out of 5 and wrote, "Had there been complaints that the season hadn't been bloody enough? Iv'e been very much enjoying things, but I know that's often a complaint about serial dramas with a violent edge, that the middle of their seasons don't feel action-y enough. Well, if anyone HAD been making that complaint about Justified, this episode is here to scream in their face, all 'OKAY?! THIS GOOD ENOUGH?!' The bodies are hitting the floor in rapid succession." Dan Forcella of TV Fanatic gave the episode a 4.5 star rating out of 5 and wrote, "There was a lot to love about 'Outlaw'. The trials and tribulations that Raylan was put through, the schemes that Boyd put together, and their chemistry together in that one epic scene washed the bad taste from 'Money Trap' right out of my mouth."

=== Accolades ===
TVLine named Timothy Olyphant as an honorable mention as the "Performer of the Week" for the week of March 2, 2013, for his performance in the episode. The site wrote, "Whether fighting back tears (where'd those come from?) or attempting to understand why he'd grieve his long-estranged father, Olyphant's emotional display was a welcome — and wonderfully executed — change of pace for the typically cool customer."
