= Truth and Consequences (Justified) =

- Justified episode
- Episode no.: Season 4 Episode 3
- Directed by: Jon Avnet
- Written by: Benjamin Cavell
- Cinematography by: Francis Kenny
- Editing by: Keith Henderson
- Original air date: January 22, 2013
- Running time: 40 minutes

Guest appearances
- Jere Burns as Wynn Duffy; Ron Eldard as Colton "Colt" Rhodes; Joseph Mazzello as Billy St. Cyr; Robert Baker as Randall Kusik; Julia Campbell as Eve Munro; Michael Graziadei as Mason Goines; Jenn Lyon as Lindsey Salazar; Jesse Luken as Jimmy Tolan; David Meunier as Johnny Crowder; Abby Miller as Ellen May; Lindsay Pulsipher as Cassie St. Cyr; Josh Stamberg as FBI Agent Alex Barnes

Episode chronology
← Previous "Where's Waldo?"	Next → "This Bird Has Flown"
- Justified (season 4)

"Truth and Consequences" is the third episode of the fourth season of the American Neo-Western television series Justified. It is the 42nd overall episode of the series and was written by producer Benjamin Cavell and directed by Jon Avnet. It originally aired on FX on January 22, 2013.

The series is based on Elmore Leonard's stories about the character Raylan Givens, particularly "Fire in the Hole", which serves as the basis for the episode. The series follows Raylan Givens, a tough deputy U.S. Marshal enforcing his own brand of justice. The series revolves around the inhabitants and culture in the Appalachian Mountains area of eastern Kentucky, specifically Harlan County where many of the main characters grew up. In the episode, Raylan starts to look for Drew Thompson, who he now believes is alive after his visit to the Truth family. Meanwhile, Boyd continues confronting preacher Billy St. Cyr but things take an ugly turn.

According to Nielsen Media Research, the episode was seen by an estimated 2.44 million household viewers and gained a 1.0 ratings share among adults aged 18–49. The episode received positive reviews from critics, who praised the character development, although some expressed a polarized response to the closure to Billy's storyline.

== Plot ==
Boyd (Walton Goggins) approaches Cassie (Lindsay Pulsipher) at the Church, accusing her of controlling his brother and the Church for profit, which she doesn't deny. Boyd offers her money to leave but she demands more. Later, he sends Colt (Ron Eldard) and Jimmy (Jesse Luken) to vandalize the Church. However, the tent is revealed to contain snakes, many of which mortally bite Jimmy.

Raylan (Timothy Olyphant) and Lindsey (Jenn Lyon) talk about Randall (Robert Baker), who is revealed to be working as a brawler. Randall served time in prison but Lindsey admits she also stole from many men before. He finds that Randall is not allowed to leave Florida and tells him he has until the 6 p.m. to leave the state. Raylan also starts to look for Drew Thompson, who he now believes is alive after his visit to the Truth family. He is told by Mullen (Nick Searcy) that at the time of Drew Thompson's apparent death 30 years ago he was wanted in a sealed federal witness warrant, putting the search for Thompson under the purview of the Marshals.

Raylan and Tim (Jacob Pitts) then visit Thompson's former wife, Eve Munro (Julia Campbell), a psychic. Raylan is skeptical of her, but is surprised when she deduces he will meet a "weightlifter" or "fighter" that he shouldn't be meeting. An FBI agent, Alex Barnes (Josh Stamberg) appears, wanting to speak with Eve. While Raylan and Tim question him, Eve escapes through a window but is knocked out unconscious by a man named Mason Goines (Michael Graziadei). Unbeknownst to them, Barnes is actually working with Goines, who takes Eve to a hotel room to find Drew's location.

At the bar, a doctor treats Jimmy, whose condition surprisingly is stronger than expected. Johnny then secretly meets with Duffy (Jere Burns), offering a partnership and even offering himself to kill Boyd.

At the gym, Raylan prepares to meet with Randall, but he's cleared out his locker. As Raylan leaves, he finds Barnes has trailed him. He deduces Barnes's intentions and confronts him. Barnes tells him where Eve is and then kills himself. Raylan and the team arrive at the motel room where Goines was about to torture Eve and arrests him. After Goines is revealed to be working for Theo Tonin, Eve then confesses that Theo Tonin wanted her husband dead after he saw Theo kill a federal witness.

At the Church, Billy (Joe Mazzello) is talking to the congregation when Boyd arrives with a snake in a box. Boyd challenges Billy as he found out the snake that he shows to the congregation has been drained of its venom by Cassie, something Billy himself didn't know. This humiliates Billy in front of the crowd, so he sets out to take Boyd's snake. He holds it and the snake bites him in front of everyone. As Billy dies, Boyd leaves the church, ashamed. Raylan meets Rachel (Erica Tazel) at the bar, who just left her husband. Raylan notes that Lindsey is nowhere to be seen. He returns to his apartment, to find that it's been robbed and his money is gone.

== Production ==
=== Development ===
In January 2013, it was reported that the third episode of the fourth season would be titled "Truth and Consequences", and was to be directed by Jon Avnet and written by producer Benjamin Cavell.

=== Writing ===
Lindsey's storyline was based on a pitch with the phrase "I want to have a word with my wife" in the writers' room. Series developer Graham Yost explained, "One of the things in Elmore Leonard's world that we've embraced is that people have a hard time changing. You end up doing the same things again and again, and you swear you're not going to. But Raylan has a blind spot for pretty women. That's basically it. You see what you want to see and you hear what you want to hear."

Yost previewed that the episode would reveal more about Cassie, "she's not so much badass as she's the pragmatic hand guiding things and keeping things afloat for her brother." Regarding the opening scene between Boyd and Cassie, Yost said, "we wanted to make sure that Cassie was a formidable adversary for Boyd, that she's not cowed by him." For the scene where Jimmy is bitten by the snakes, the crew shot a scene showing Billy praying while all of this happens. The writers decided to remove the scene, deeming it "distracting and it didn't really help the scene."

The episode featured the death of Billy St. Cyr, played by Joseph Mazzello. The writers wanted to establish that Boyd didn't want the character to die, having symphatized with Billy's intentions. The confrontation "kinda hurts him to bring down a man of faith. And yet, it then confirms again his dark nihilistic view of the world." Yost also added, "So it was just the idea that he offers up the challenge, it's a test of Billy's faith, and he's hoping that Cassie will stop him and that that will be that. The church will then have to pack up and move on. That's all he wanted. He didn't want Billy to die. It was Billy's own feeling of having been betrayed by Cassie and his own hubris — that 'No, no, the Lord is gonna protect me.'"

== Reception ==
=== Viewers ===
In its original American broadcast, "Truth and Consequences" was seen by an estimated 2.44 million household viewers and gained a 1.0 ratings share among adults aged 18–49, according to Nielsen Media Research. This means that 1 percent of all households with televisions watched the episode. This was a slight decrease in viewership from the previous episode, which was watched by 2.45 million viewers with a 0.9 in the 18-49 demographics.

=== Critical reviews ===
"Truth and Consequences" received positive reviews from critics. Seth Amitin of IGN gave the episode a "good" 7 out of 10 and wrote, "It's impossible for any series to be perfect, but shows can set themselves up to be excellent. While this episode could have been smoother, it drowned its puppies. I'm not sure where the writers are taking us from here, but I have faith, just like Billy, that they'll come through. Hopefully, we don't get bit."

Scott Tobias of The A.V. Club gave the episode a "B+" grade and wrote, "After two knockout episodes to kick off season four, Justified slips just a tad this week, as the season's two main storylines settle in, and begin to repeat their big beats. In terms of advancing the plot, 'Truth And Consequences' doesn't deliver much." Kevin Fitzpatrick of Screen Crush wrote, "So far the season seems to be putting Raylan through a number of struggles to get ahead, so we don't mind saying that the character could use a bit of redemption in the near future. And finally, we're excited to see where the Waldo Truth/Drew Thompson mystery goes now with its connection to Theo Tonin, particularly given Johnny Crowder's nefarious dealings with Wynn Duffy."

Alan Sepinwall of HitFix wrote, "Another good outing. A bit rushed in spots, but overall I'm pleased with how the new season is balancing the big and small stories so far – and that's without Raylan and Boyd sharing a single frame so far." Rachel Larimore of Slate wrote, "I was fearful that the writers might be too cynical in this story arc and make Cassie and Billy out to be total frauds. I like the direction that they took with Billy being a true believer, and I like the smaller moments, like tonight when the camera flashed on Ellen May."

Mandl Blerly of Entertainment Weekly wrote, "You could tell from the slithering soundtrack that started this episode, when Boyd went to negotiate with Cassie at the Last Chance Holiness Church, that snakes would play a pivotal role this hour. Then again, the rattler that killed Billy wasn't the only snake in this episode. Lindsey is just a lot prettier." Joe Reid of Vulture gave the episode a 3 star rating out of 5 and wrote, "Well! When I mentioned Chekhov's Rattlesnake in the season premiere, I did not think it would be this soon that we'd see someone suffer a serpent attack. And we ended up with two someones! The show also did not waste any time in paying off last week's promised showdown between Boyd Crowder and Cassie, whom he identified as the real power behind Preacher Billy's church. Their pre-credits confrontation was a sizing-up that promises one hell of a battle of wills throughout the season."

Dan Forcella of TV Fanatic gave the episode a perfect 5 star rating out of 5 and wrote, "Since the back half of Justified Season 1, I have stated that this show merges self-contained episodic story lines with long running seasonal arc better than any other. I never thought that I'd say this, but through three episodes of season four, the FX drama may be doing it more impressively than ever before." Jack McKinney of Paste gave the episode an 8.8 out of 10 rating and wrote, "Week in and week out, Justified is a case study in the examination of moral compromise and the acts we rationalize to get through the day. That's high praise for a show that is basically about cops and robbers."
