= Get Drew =

- Justified episode
- Episode no.: Season 4 Episode 10
- Directed by: Billy Gierhart
- Written by: Dave Andron & VJ Boyd
- Cinematography by: Francis Kenny
- Editing by: Steve Polivka
- Original air date: March 12, 2013
- Running time: 39 minutes

Guest appearances
- Jim Beaver as Shelby Parlow/Drew Thompson; Jere Burns as Wynn Duffy; Ron Eldard as Colton "Colt" Rhodes; Daniel Buran as Nicky Cush; David Meunier as Johnny Crowder; Abby Miller as Ellen May; Mike O'Malley as Nick "Nicky" Augustine; Jesse Luken as Jimmy Tolan; Mykelti Williamson as Ellstin Limehouse

Episode chronology
← Previous "The Hatchet Tour"	Next → "Decoy"
- Justified (season 4)

"Get Drew" is the tenth episode of the fourth season of the American Neo-Western television series Justified. It is the 49th overall episode of the series and was written by co-executive producer Dave Andron and story editor VJ Boyd and directed by Billy Gierhart. It originally aired on FX on March 12, 2013.

The series is based on Elmore Leonard's stories about the character Raylan Givens, particularly "Fire in the Hole", which serves as the basis for the episode. The series follows Raylan Givens, a tough deputy U.S. Marshal enforcing his own brand of justice. The series revolves around the inhabitants and culture in the Appalachian Mountains area of eastern Kentucky, specifically Harlan County where many of the main characters grew up. In the episode, Drew Thompson is on the run with Ellen May now that his cover has been blown. Both Raylan and Boyd are trying to get to him first.

According to Nielsen Media Research, the episode was seen by an estimated 2.40 million household viewers and gained a 0.9 ratings share among adults aged 18–49. The episode received extremely positive reviews from critics, who praised the writing and repercussions for the coming episodes.

== Plot ==
Raylan (Timothy Olyphant) searches Shelby's (Jim Beaver) house for any clues while Boyd (Walton Goggins) sits on the floor in handcuffs. Boyd tells Raylan that Raylan made a wrong decision becoming a Marshal and should have followed Arlo's lead into Harlan County criminal enterprises. Boyd at this point does not know that Arlo, Raylan's father, is dead. Raylan is in no hurry to tell him.

Shelby takes his stuff from his office and gives money to Ellen May (Abby Miller) to leave town. He leaves but decides to return and pick up Ellen May, telling her they will go to Huatulco in Mexico for a better life. Their attempt to leave on a plane is disrupted when they see the Marshals in the airport and leave. Raylan expresses frustration at the airport attendant for not telling them that Shelby had a plane there and for keeping a light on outside, which alerted him to avoid them. They discover women's underwear in his house and deduce Ellen May is with him and Mullen (Nick Searcy) tells Raylan and Rachel (Erica Tazel) that they will find them.

Boyd is released from police custody and tells Ava (Joelle Carter) and Johnny (David Meunier) about the situation and sends Colt (Ron Eldard) on a mission, who promises to get everything done right. Johnny contacts Duffy (Jere Burns) about Drew Thompson's identity so he can send hitmen. However, Duffy refuses as they have no track of his location and tells Johnny to find and kill Thompson himself or Johnny will lose his right to kill Boyd.

Without the airplane or a car, Ellen May decides to take Shelby to Ellstin Limehouse (Mykelti Williamson). Shelby pays $15,000 so Limehouse can give shelter to Ellen May and take her out of town but Limehouse reveals that he knows about Shelby's real identity and takes him. Ava then visits Limehouse after Boyd and Colt torture one of Ellen May's friends for information. She sees Ellen May and Limehouse tells her that the price for both Ellen May and Shelby is $150,000 each. She tells this to Boyd, who tells her to accept it despite knowing they will not be left with anything. In fact, Boyd has been making a deal with Nicky Augustine (Mike O'Malley) to give them Thompson for $500,000.

Boyd confides his plans to Johnny through the phone. After he hangs up, Johnny is visited by Raylan and Rachel. Johnny offers to give them information on Boyd's money, which could get him arrested for tax evasion. But Raylan and Rachel are not interested in Boyd, they only want Drew Thompson and Raylan tells Johnny that if he helps them, he can help with Boyd. Boyd meets with Limehouse to deliver the money but Limehouse double crosses Boyd and says the $300,000 is enough only for one person. Despite Boyd wanting to take Ellen May, Ava tells Boyd to take Shelby instead of Ellen May. Ellen May spits in Ava's face, making Ava doubt her decision about making Boyd take Shelby.

Once Boyd has Shelby, Shelby tells Boyd that he never would have stayed in Harlan if it wasn't for breaking both of his legs on his parachute jump. As he had money and cocaine with him, he connected with Bo Crowder and Arlo Givens to protect him in exchange for a cut of the money and drug proceeds. This arrangement got the Crowder and Givens families out of trailers. Boyd feels no empathy for him and hands Shelby over to Colt, who has been assigned by Boyd to deliver him to Theo Tonin. He takes him to a field where he handcuffs him to a tractor, teasing him about what Tonin will do to him. As a helicopter approaches, Colt leaves the keys on a post and leaves the area.

As Nicky is about to exit the helicopter to take Shelby, Marshals' vans arrive, forcing him to leave without Shelby. Raylan, Mullen, Rachel and Tim (Jacob Pitts) arrive and take Shelby into custody, thanks to Johnny's tip. Colt evades the authorities and informs Boyd about the situation, worrying him and Ava as they don't know what will happen now as they lost their money and Tonin will be furious. Duffy is also notified of the situation and intends to leave the country. Back on the field, Raylan tells Mullen they will have trouble getting Shelby out of Harlan County alive.

== Production ==
=== Development ===
In February 2013, it was reported that the tenth episode of the fourth season would be titled "Get Drew", and was to be directed by Billy Gierhart and written by co-executive producer Dave Andron and story editor VJ Boyd.

=== Casting ===
The episode featured the return of Mykelti Williamson as Ellstin Limehouse, last seen in "Slaughterhouse". On bringing him back, series developer Graham Yost said, "That idea just came into the room. I told Mykelti at the beginning of the season, because we're old friends from Boomtown, 'I don't know if you're coming back, but we're certainly talking about it because we love you and love what you've done with Limehouse'. We just felt this pull to get up into Noble's, and we knew that this was a place where Ava had hidden out in the past. We also knew that one of the whores in the previous season had been giving information to Limehouse, so we knew there was a connection there for Ellen May. It all made sense."

== Reception ==
=== Viewers ===
In its original American broadcast, "Get Drew" was seen by an estimated 2.40 million household viewers and gained a 0.9 ratings share among adults aged 18–49, according to Nielsen Media Research. This means that 0.9 percent of all households with televisions watched the episode. This was a 3% increase in viewership from the previous episode, which was watched by 2.32 million viewers with a 0.9 in the 18-49 demographics.

=== Critical reviews ===
"Get Drew" received extremely positive reviews from critics. Seth Amitin of IGN gave the episode a "great" 8.9 out of 10 and wrote, "This was a fun episode. We were left guessing throughout who would capture him and we weren't disappointed. First it looked like Raylan had him cornered, then Limehouse pulled the switch on us and then Johnny turned on his cousin. It was a rollercoaster. Maybe the highest compliment to these mystery games is how understated they've been. Maybe the biggest problem is that they've been too understated."

Noel Murray of The A.V. Club gave the episode an "A−" grade and wrote, "This week's Justified episode is all about taking that moment, to reflect on where we are right now, and who got us there. 'Get Drew' is a strangely muted episode, especially given that it's the rare Justified in which nearly all of the major characters are in Harlan at the same time, playing out a fraught game of cat-and-mouse. Undoubtedly, there will be more than a little violence before this season wraps up, three weeks from now. But for this week, credited writers Dave Andron and VJ Boyd and director Billy Gierhart delivered something more like Justified: The Play, shifting focus around a small stage for a series of lengthy dialogues and monologues, allowing each set of actors to have a moment or two in the spotlight." Kevin Fitzpatrick of Screen Crush wrote, "It's incredible to think that we still have three episodes of Justified remaining in the season, what with the rapid and exhilarating pace of 'Get Drew'. After all, it seems the season only has so many more avenues to travel down with regard to the Drew Thompson thread, but the looming threat of escaping Harlan and the Detroit mafia should prove an exciting prospect in the next few hours."

Alan Sepinwall of HitFix wrote, "'Get Drew' is a pretty textbook piece-mover episode, there to get all the players in position for Raylan to make his 'We just have to figure out how to get out of Harlan alive' declaration in the closing seconds. But as piece-movers go, it's an awful lot of fun." Rachel Larimore of Slate wrote, "I think the big lesson from tonight's episode was to be careful in whom you put your trust. Shelby, under duress, put his trust in Ellen May, and Boyd chose to put his trust in Colt rather than Johnny, a decision that backfired on a number of levels. And now everyone in Harlan is on the run from Theo Tonin. What a great episode."

Joe Reid of Vulture gave the episode a 4 star rating out of 5 and wrote, "Well, Drew Thompson has been apprehended by the federal marshals, having foiled both the Tonins and the Cowders, and there are still three episodes left in the season. At least one of which will involve a harrowing and likely violent escape from Witch Mountain as Raylan and company try to get Drew out of Harlan and back to Lexington. But that's for next week. This week, a whoooole lotta stuff went down to get us to that point." Dan Forcella of TV Fanatic gave the episode a 4 star rating out of 5 and wrote, "This fourth season of Justified hasn't felt like the three the preceded it. The search for Drew Thompson - in one way or another - has really seemed to drive the whole thing. Each and every episode, including 'Get Drew', has had its own identity, but it still has felt more and more serialized than anything the series had done before."
