= Decoy (Justified) =

- Justified episode
- Episode no.: Season 4 Episode 11
- Directed by: Michael Watkins
- Written by: Graham Yost & Chris Provenzano
- Cinematography by: Francis Kenny
- Editing by: Harvey Rosenstock
- Original air date: March 19, 2013
- Running time: 40 minutes

Guest appearances
- Jim Beaver as Shelby Parlow/Drew Thompson; Ron Eldard as Colton "Colt" Rhodes; Bobby Campo as Yolo; Chet Grissom as Officer LaPlante; John Kapelos as Picker; David Meunier as Johnny Crowder; Mike O'Malley as Nick "Nicky" Augustine; Patton Oswalt as Constable Bob Sweeney

Episode chronology
← Previous "Get Drew"	Next → "Peace of Mind"
- Justified (season 4)

"Decoy" is the eleventh episode of the fourth season of the American Neo-Western television series Justified. It is the 50th overall episode of the series and was written by series developer Graham Yost and producer Chris Provenzano and directed by Michael W. Watkins. It originally aired on FX on March 19, 2013.

The series is based on Elmore Leonard's stories about the character Raylan Givens, particularly "Fire in the Hole", which serves as the basis for the episode. The series follows Raylan Givens, a tough deputy U.S. Marshal enforcing his own brand of justice. The series revolves around the inhabitants and culture in the Appalachian Mountains area of eastern Kentucky, specifically Harlan County where many of the main characters grew up. In the episode, the Marshals work to take Drew Thompson out of Harlan while Boyd works with Theo Tonin's crew to get Drew back.

According to Nielsen Media Research, the episode was seen by an estimated 2.45 million household viewers and gained a 0.9 ratings share among adults aged 18–49. The episode received universal acclaim from critics, who praised the writing, action scenes, tension, character development, pace and acting (particularly Patton Oswalt and Mike O'Malley), with many deeming it one of the series' best episodes. The episode was named by IndieWire, Time, Vulture and TV Guide as one of the best episodes of 2013.

== Plot ==
The Marshals have taken refuge at Arlo's house while Tonin's hitmen are looking for Drew Thompson (Jim Beaver). At the bar, Nicky Augustine (Mike O'Malley) brutally attacks Boyd (Walton Goggins) for his failure in delivering Drew. Boyd then makes another deal for $500,000 where he will help them get close to Drew.

Raylan (Timothy Olyphant) and Rachel (Erica Tazel) stay with Drew at the house while Mullen (Nick Searcy) and Tim (Jacob Pitts) create a decoy of cars that supposedly will take Drew out of town. In the outskirts, Tim notices three abandoned cars and assumes is a set-up for an ambush based on bomb-rigged cars and snipers. During this, Colt (Ron Eldard) and a Tonin hitman have been assigned to keep track of them. Tim notices this and calls him, where they trade insults. Colt then tells the hitman to shoot at the back of the cars to motivate them to move. However, Tim decides to do something: the cars circle the abandoned cars and draw their guns at them. Colt immediately calls Boyd to tell him that the cars are a decoy.

Raylan and Rachel take Drew to an abandoned school in Evarts. There, Raylan receives a call from Bob (Patton Oswalt), who was alerted of their presence at Arlo's house. Then, a truck arrives and a Tonin hitman, Yolo (Bobby Campo), takes him hostage and brutally attacks him in the house. Bob resists revealing Drew's location and fights back Yolo, stabbing him in the leg and killing him just as Raylan arrives. Raylan and Bob arrive at the school but Boyd has already deduced their school location and hitmen are going there.

As a helicopter approaches the school, the team prepares to fight back. Raylan catches Boyd and hitman Picker (John Kapelos) in the stairs. He threatens them to leave, but they intend to return with back-up. Back at the outskirts, Tim decides to test the cars by using a Molotov cocktail, which causes the abandoned cars to explode. As the Marshals retreat in their cars, Colt tricks the hitman to hand over his rifle and kills him. At the bar, Nicky insults Ava (Joelle Carter) and is told by Johnny (David Meunier) to stop. Nicky then exposes Johnny's betrayal and having secretly collaborated with Duffy. Ava manages to get Nick's gun after distracting Nick with brandy and a lighter to the face. Johnny has a gun on Ava and tells Ava he loves her. Ava leaves the bar and Johnny doesn't shoot or follow her.

Back at the school, Boyd, Picker and the back-up team have arrived and find Raylan and Bob in the principal's office but no sign of Drew. As police sirens approach, Raylan explains that they could simply leave or face getting arrested. Boyd immediately leaves and Picker and his team soon follow. The Marshals arrive and Bob explains that Drew didn't need to be transported by car or air. The final scene shows Rachel and Drew on a coal train safely leaving Harlan.

== Production ==
=== Development ===
In February 2013, it was reported that the eleventh episode of the fourth season would be titled "Decoy", and was to be directed by Michael Watkins and written by series developer Graham Yost and producer Chris Provenzano.

=== Writing ===
The idea to set part of the episode in an abandoned high school was done to save costs. Series developer Graham Yost said, "honestly, it was just trying to make the thing producible. Where could we go and just camp out for a couple of days? It posed certain problems for us. We didn't want any gunplay in a school, naturally, given the recent events. So we wanted to make sure it was an empty school, and that's part of the reality in that area — they did consolidate the schools into one big school. It takes Raylan back to this youth, and it reminds us of where Raylan came from."

Bob getting attacked was an idea of star Timothy Olyphant. The scene served as a homage to True Romance. Yost explained, "when you torture a character you find out who they are. It doesn't literally have to be physical torture, but when you tighten the screws, you see who they are." Speaking on Oswalt's acting in the episode, Yost said, "we've been very blessed to have him on the show, and the other side of that is that he gets to do stuff that he hasn’t gotten to do before, which makes it even more fun for us."

Speaking on Johnny's revelation, Yost said, "One of my favorite moments is, as Fred Golan noticed, the little hitch in David's voice when he says it. 'Ava, I... I love you.' And the outing, we knew that we wanted to have it happen in this episode and we wanted to have it happen in this scene. And then again, there were adjustments on how it actually came out. In an earlier version, he's not outed until after Ava has threatened to set Nicky on fire, gotten a gun, and says, 'Come on, Johnny, let's go', and then you realize he's not going and then it comes out and he leaves. The switch was made: Let's have it come before, which is just another thing that tightens the screw on Ava. Just as Bob was beaten up and we saw who he really was, get Ava in this situation that gets worse and worse and worse and we see who she really is and what she's capable of." Ava's response was originally written as "If you really want to do something for me, put a bullet in your head" but the writers decided to change it to "Oh, that's sweet."

== Reception ==
=== Viewers ===
In its original American broadcast, "Decoy" was seen by an estimated 2.45 million household viewers and gained a 0.9 ratings share among adults aged 18–49, according to Nielsen Media Research. This means that 0.9 percent of all households with televisions watched the episode. This was a slight increase in viewership from the previous episode, which was watched by 2.40 million viewers with a 0.9 in the 18-49 demographics.

=== Critical reviews ===
"Decoy" received universal acclaim from critics. Seth Amitin of IGN gave the episode an "amazing" 9.1 out of 10 and wrote, "'Decoy' was a clever episode, smart on one end and grueling on the other. It was bloody and ruthless and a tad mean-spirited. It was exactly what it should've been and Augustine/Tonin leading the action is releasing the show's season-long pent-up anger and hostility."

Noel Murray of The A.V. Club gave the episode an "A" grade and wrote, "Here's how I know 'Decoy' was a great Justified episode: I didn't realize it was just about done until there were only about two minutes to go. And that revelation was almost painful. I know 'I didn't want it to end' is a hacky kind of praise, but god damn it, it's true in this case. I could've lived inside of 'Decoy' for at least another hour." Kevin Fitzpatrick of Screen Crush wrote, "Well boy, if that wasn't one of the better Justified episodes we've ever seen! We still have a reservation or two how the series might keep the momentum going through two more episodes, but 'Decoy' manages to deliver the series' most tense hour to date, without losing any of the wit and crackle that make otherwise dramatic scenes come to life the way Justified allows."

Alan Sepinwall of HitFix wrote, "Cool as an astronaut landing a helicopter on the baseball diamond must have been to the teenage versions of Boyd, Ava, Johnny and Raylan, I would say the entirety of 'Decoy' just topped it for me." James Poniewozik of Time wrote, "'Decoy', the best episode of an increasingly good season 4, is an action-oriented episode, insofar as there's a showdown and beatdowns, helicopters and trains, guns are fired and shit blows up. But it's also a siege episode, whose events take place practically in real time, which means a lot of waiting and assessing and talking."

Rachel Larimore of Slate wrote, "It's not easy to steal an entire episode of Justified from Raylan and Boyd. One or the other, maybe, but not both. Especially a late-season episode devoted to pitting Raylan directly against Boyd with lives at stake. But Patton Oswalt's Constable Bob proved worthy of the challenge in 'Decoy'. And his moment of badassness served as a good reminder to fans. There is so much that Justified does so well that it's amusing, even a source of pride, to find something to complain about. But while you're complaining, you should probably recognize you're just being impatient." Joe Reid of Vulture gave the episode a perfect 5 star rating out of 5 and wrote, "The setup at the end of last week's episode made some big promises, I'd say, with Raylan and the Lexington Gang poised to usher Shelby, a.k.a. Drew Thompson, out of the most dangerous ground in Harlan County. And with Boyd Crowder conscripted by the Tonins to join the fray, expectations were raised even higher. 'Decoy' managed to meet those expectations with room to spare."

Dan Forcella of TV Fanatic gave the episode a perfect 5 star rating out of 5 and wrote, "With pulse pounding stalemates, thrilling fist fights, secrets revealed, subtle wit, and clever solutions to our heroes' problems, this hour of Justified proved once again why it is one of the best dramas on television." Jack McKinney of Paste gave the episode a 9.8 out of 10 and wrote, "I know this is a long lead-in, but I want to be clear about one thing: This may be the best hour of television you will see this year, and it deserves to be put in the proper context."

=== Accolades ===
TVLine named Mike O'Malley the "Performer of the Week" for the week of March 23, 2013, for his performance in the episode. The site wrote, "Perhaps especially impressive is the fact that O'Malley's performance here is a full-on 180 from the role for which he's best known: Kurt's dad – perennial Father of the Year Burt – on Glee. That he can not only make us forget Burt but make us forget Burt and absolutely loathe Nicky is the kind of feat that deserves recognition."
