= Foot Chase =

- Justified episode
- Episode no.: Season 4 Episode 6
- Directed by: Peter Werner
- Written by: Dave Andron & Ingrid Escajeda
- Cinematography by: Francis Kenny
- Editing by: Steve Polivka
- Original air date: February 12, 2013
- Running time: 40 minutes

Guest appearances
- Jim Beaver as Sheriff Shelby Parlow; Ron Eldard as Colton "Colt" Rhodes; Brian Howe as Arnold; Gerald McRaney as Josiah Cairn; David Meunier as Johnny Crowder; Romy Rosemont as Sonya Gable; Lew Temple as Grady; Salvator Xuereb as John; Casey Brown as Benny; Ian Reed Kesler as Mark; Alexandra Kyle as Roz; Michael Stoyanov as Dave

Episode chronology
← Previous "Kin"	Next → "Money Trap"
- Justified (season 4)

"Foot Chase" is the sixth episode of the fourth season of the American Neo-Western television series Justified. It is the 45th overall episode of the series and was written by co-executive producer Dave Andron and executive story editor Ingrid Escajeda and directed by Peter Werner. It originally aired on FX on February 12, 2013.

The series is based on Elmore Leonard's stories about the character Raylan Givens, particularly "Fire in the Hole", which serves as the basis for the episode. The series follows Raylan Givens, a tough deputy U.S. Marshal enforcing his own brand of justice. The series revolves around the inhabitants and culture in the Appalachian Mountains area of eastern Kentucky, specifically Harlan County where many of the main characters grew up. In the episode, Raylan works in finding Josiah Cairn after he finds his severed foot in his house and must team with Sheriff Shelby in his quest. Meanwhile, Boyd and Ava attempt to get closer to high society in order to find Drew Thompson.

According to Nielsen Media Research, the episode was seen by an estimated 2.30 million household viewers and gained a 0.9 ratings share among adults aged 18–49. The episode received mixed-to-positive reviews from critics; while critics praised the scenes with Raylan and Shelby, critics expressed frustration with the episode's tone and lack of direction.

== Plot ==
Boyd (Walton Goggins) and Colt (Ron Eldard) interrogate a wealthy banker that may be Drew Thompson but the man turns out to be the person he claims to be, forcing them to leave. Raylan (Timothy Olyphant) sees as Marshals inspect the yard, with no sign of Cairn (Gerald McRaney), except his severed foot. Raylan finds a bloody footprint in the yard that is unmistakably from Roz's (Alexandra Kyle) cast boot.

Raylan doesn't know where she may have run off to, so he starts with her boyfriend's trailer. Raylan finds the boyfriend target shooting at a picture of a Native American. Sheriff Shelby (Jim Beaver) turns up, and deduces from the picture where the stepdaughter is. After they find her, she tells them some guys in a beat-up van took her stepdad and called him "Drew Thompson." Shelby tells Raylan that he earned the job with Boyd's help but he is not in his payroll, although Raylan remains unconvinced. Tim (Jacob Pitts) picks up a veteran friend, Mark (Ian Reed Kesler) at a clinic for addiction and they see Colt entering the clinic. Colt forces a recovering addict to help him get a new heroin dealer. He also attacks a prostitute when she states to be unaware of Ellen May's (Abby Miller) location.

In an attempt to get closer to the real Drew Thompson, Ava (Joelle Carter) suggests she and Boyd attend a high-class party. Shelby arrives and arrests Boyd for questioning on Cairn's case. He takes them to his office, where Raylan is also waiting. Boyd is uncooperative until he gets nervous when Shelby mentions Ellen May's disappearance. Boyd's lawyer, Sonya Gable (Romy Rosemont) shows up to get Boyd, and deflects Raylan's questions about why she's stalling Arlo's pardon. Cairn is revealed to be in an undisclosed location with two men and Sonya is revealed to be part of the situation. They decide to cauterize his stump as he is quickly losing blood.

Ava blackmails Arnold (Brian Howe) to get her and Boyd invited to Tillman Napier's swinger party for the next day and he agrees to get them in. Raylan and Shelby follow Sonya to a house with a beat-up van and find Cairn just as they are continuing with the cauterization. Arlo told Sonya that Cairn was Drew Thompson, which Cairn denies. Cairn says the former Harlan County Sheriff Hunter Mosley somehow knows where Drew Thompson is. As authorities arrive to take them to the hospital and jail, Raylan and Shelby share some experiences in their lives, although Shelby still does not tell Raylan that Ellen May is with him.

Tim accompanies Mark to confront a dealer to whom he owes money. When the dealer demands more money, Tim holds him at gunpoint and ends up paying Mark's debt. Johnny (David Meunier) and Colt attack a customer who supposedly hit on a prostitute, but Johnny does not know Colt is the one who hit her. Colt brutally attacks the man and leaves the apartment. At the bar, Ava confesses to Boyd that she regrets ordering Ellen May's assassination and wonders where their relationship is going. Boyd then shows her he is saving money for their future and then shows her a ring. He proposes to Ava, who happily accepts.

== Production ==
=== Development ===
In January 2013, it was reported that the sixth episode of the fourth season would be titled "Foot Chase", and was to be directed by Peter Werner and written by co-executive producer Dave Andron and executive story editor Ingrid Escajeda.

=== Writing ===
Series developer Graham Yost teased that the episode would answer the question on Boyd's plans with the money. On Boyd's proposal, Yost said, "There are a bunch of pivotal episodes this season, this is certainly one of them. It's a pivotal episode for the series. We knew Boyd and Ava were a devoted couple, but a proposal ups the ante. With what's gonna happen specifically in episode 7, and the things they have to do, we just thought this was the time." Actress Joelle Carter stated that Ava's reaction, "Oh baby, it’s the other hand", was unscripted. She said, "he actually put it on the wrong hand. I don't know if it was the rehearsal or the first take, but I said, 'I'm keeping that, Walton'. And he's like, 'Okay'. It's just so sweet. I don't know if it happened because Boyd was nervous. To me, I feel like Boyd's never asked anyone to marry him before, so that's why it happened. I don't know why it happened with Walton."

Yost also teased that Shelby would play a pivotal role in the episode, "He will be up to speed when he figures out what Raylan's doing, and that's basically what episode 6 is about: Raylan begrudgingly accepting some help from Shelby in looking for Drew Thompson."

=== Casting ===
Despite being credited, Erica Tazel does not appear in the episode as her respective character.

== Reception ==
=== Viewers ===
In its original American broadcast, "Foot Chase" was seen by an estimated 2.30 million household viewers and gained a 0.9 ratings share among adults aged 18–49, according to Nielsen Media Research. This means that 0.9 percent of all households with televisions watched the episode. This was a 5% decrease in viewership from the previous episode, which was watched by 2.42 million viewers with a 0.9 in the 18-49 demographics.

=== Critical reviews ===
"Foot Chase" received mixed-to-positive reviews from critics. Seth Amitin of IGN gave the episode a "good" 7.7 out of 10 and wrote, "If you were to sum up what this season is about, what would you say? It's not entirely about the chase for Drew Thompson, since they haven't spent that much time on it. It's not about Boyd and Raylan. It's not about Boyd trying to defeat a preacher who's converting his addicts into believers. 'Foot Chase' is another episode in Season 4 that seems to have an idea of where the season is going, but falls short of organizing the tumbling ideas, plots and arcs."

Noel Murray of The A.V. Club gave the episode a "B−" grade and wrote, "'Foot Chase' is the weakest Justified episode of the season so far, but if nothing else, it gives us the line above, which when all is said and done could end up being the thesis statement for season four, if not the entire series." Kevin Fitzpatrick of Screen Crush wrote, "Just about at the midway point through its fourth season, and Justified's story has picked up considerably. We have to hope that the church stories of the first few episodes will circle back around at some point, if only to "justify" their presence before 'Kin' and 'Foot Chase' hit the gas on the Drew Thompson storyline. Most of 'Foot Chase's plots fire on all cylinders, though the hour will most likely be remembered for its closing scenes between Boyd and Ava, and rightfully so."

Alan Sepinwall of HitFix wrote, "This has been a darned entertaining season of Justified so far, but 'Foot Chase' illustrated some of the pitfalls of building the season around this complicated mystery story involving many players with many agendas. It's an episode that almost works anyway, thanks to the chemistry between Raylan and Shelby in one corner and Boyd and Ava in another, but on the whole, it's a mess. The hour tries to pack too much in, and the storytelling suffers as a result." Rachel Larimore of Slate wrote, "Justified loves its odd couples. It was nice to see Shelby out and sparring with people—too often he seems like the resident impotent sheriff mostly around to maintain the criminal order."

Joe Reid of Vulture gave the episode a perfect 5 star rating out of 5 and wrote, "Everything that happened between Raylan and Shelby was gold this week, from their swapping stories about their worst jobs pre-law-enforcement to Shelby telling Raylan about the last time before tonight that he shot a guy." Dan Forcella of TV Fanatic gave the episode a 4.5 star rating out of 5 and wrote, "Boyd Crowder's clan has been reeling for a while now. Whether it be exterior issues via Preacher Billy and Wynn Duffy or within the group courtesy of Johnny wavering, Shelby defecting, Ellen May escaping, and Colton jones-ing, the Crowder clan has been in dire straits. The ending to "Foot Chase" was the greatness that came out of that terrible situation, and it was incredible for several reasons."
