= Ghosts (Justified) =

- Justified episode
- Episode no.: Season 4 Episode 13
- Directed by: Bill Johnson
- Written by: Fred Golan & Benjamin Cavell
- Cinematography by: Richard Crudo
- Editing by: Steve Polivka
- Original air date: April 2, 2013
- Running time: 40 minutes

Guest appearances
- Jere Burns as Wynn Duffy; Sam Anderson as Lee Paxton; Rick Gomez as AUSA David Vasquez; John Kapelos as Picker; Mike O'Malley as Nick "Nicky" Augustine; Max Perlich as Sammy Tonin; Lindsay Pulsipher as Cassie St. Cyr; Troy Ruptash as Dominic; William Gregory Lee as Sheriff Nick Mooney; Jesse Luken as Jimmy Tolan; Natalie Zea as Winona Hawkins

Episode chronology
← Previous "Peace of Mind"	Next → "A Murder of Crowes"
- Justified (season 4)

"Ghosts" is the thirteenth episode and season finale of the fourth season of the American Neo-Western television series Justified. It is the 52nd overall episode of the series and was written by executive producer Fred Golan and producer Benjamin Cavell and directed by Bill Johnson. It originally aired on FX on April 2, 2013.

The series is based on Elmore Leonard's stories about the character Raylan Givens, particularly "Fire in the Hole", which serves as the basis for the episode. The series follows Raylan Givens, a tough deputy U.S. Marshal enforcing his own brand of justice. The series revolves around the inhabitants and culture in the Appalachian Mountains area of eastern Kentucky, specifically Harlan County where many of the main characters grew up. In the episode, Raylan decides to confront Nicky Augustine after Winona's life is threatened while Boyd and Ava work to avoid detection by the police in relation to a murder.

According to Nielsen Media Research, the episode was seen by an estimated 2.25 million household viewers and gained a 0.7 ratings share among adults aged 18–49. The episode received universal acclaim from critics, who praised the direction, writing, pace, twists, acting (particularly Walton Goggins) and set-up for the next season.

== Plot ==
After taking Drew Thompson and Ellen May into custody, Art (Nick Searcy) suspends Raylan (Timothy Olyphant), who happily accepts it. Meanwhile, Boyd (Walton Goggins) and Ava (Joelle Carter) are worried about their future and decide to get Delroy Baker's body before the authorities find him with Jimmy's (Jesse Luken) help. However, when they arrive, it's too late as the police already arrived and took the body.

Raylan visits Winona (Natalie Zea), who is being held hostage by three henchmen working for Augustine (Mike O'Malley). The men want to use Winona as leverage so that Raylan will take them to Drew Thompson. Raylan and Winona manage to kill the three men. Afterwards, Art warns Raylan he will be fired if he goes after Augustine. He secretly tells Winona he intends to find the men responsible for this. At the bar, Boyd then decides to use his leverage with Lee Paxton (Sam Anderson), who owns the funeral home that Delroy's body is in. Boyd tells Lee to help him now, and his debt will be repaid. Lee accepts swapping the bodies before the autopsy report but he tells Boyd that he will need to find another dead body. That night, Boyd and Jimmy exhume the tomb of a dealer and deliver the corpse to the bar.

While Boyd explains his intentions to Ava, they are visited by Raylan, who suspects Boyd worked with Augustine on Winona's hostage situation, which he denies. He uses his authority to threaten Boyd and Ava, although they realize he is suspended. When Raylan says Ellen May confessed many things, Boyd agrees to take him to meet with Augustine while Ava works with Jimmy in swapping the bodies. Boyd takes Raylan to an airport where Raylan meets Augustine in his limo and offers him the deal of turning himself in and swearing not to harm his family. Augustine scoffs at the threat and vows to kill Raylan's family once he returns to Harlan after killing Sammy Tonin (Max Perlich) in Detroit. Raylan exits the limo but is revealed that he already called Sammy to Harlan. After warning him of Augustine's intentions and walking away as he is suspended, Raylan allows Sammy's henchman (and Picker, who has seen which horse to back) execute Augustine by shooting up his limo.

While working on swapping the bodies, Ava tells Jimmy she will do it alone and makes him get out of the van. While disposing the body, she is arrested when Mooney (William Gregory Lee) finds her, Mooney having engineered an elaborate scheme to incarcerate Boyd but didn't expect Ava to do it. Boyd quickly arrives at the scene and brutally attacks Mooney until he is restrained by the officers. Boyd sees Cassie (Lindsay Pulsipher) in the distance observing the bust as she was the anonymous tipster. Before they take Ava, Boyd vows to have Ava free in 24 hours by buying her the best lawyer money can afford although Ava is skeptical.

Raylan helps Winona pack her stuff as she will move with her mother for her safety. Duffy visits a distracted Boyd at the bar, telling him that he is now in charge of heroin distribution in Harlan. Boyd later breaks into the house he wanted to buy with Ava and looks around stoically. Boyd takes one last look at the path he thought would lead him away from his roots. The last part of the episode shows Raylan plastering over the hole in the wall of Arlo's house (the house Raylan grew up in) before going outside to sit in a chair and drink while staring at the graves of Frances, Arlo, and the headstone for his own future grave-site.

== Production ==
=== Development ===
In March 2013, it was reported that the thirteenth episode of the fourth season would be titled "Ghosts", and was to be directed by Bill Johnson and written by executive producer Fred Golan and producer Benjamin Cavell.

=== Writing ===
Before the episode aired, series developer Graham Yost teased that the threat to Winona's life "would yield one of the best scenes the series has ever done". Yost said, "the idea of a big shootout in the nursery just appealed to our dark, twisted Justified sense of a really horrific place for something like this to happen. The first time they did it, Winona shot the bad guy in the leg, and then Raylan took over. Then they decided to try it once or twice with her actually firing as well. That was just an option we had in editing, and we went for it. We thought it was cool to see her firing the gun at this bastard."

Regarding Ava's arrest, Yost further detailed, "we did have an interest in raising up Boyd and Ava's hopes and dreams in the middle of the season, having it peak with the proposal and then having everything slowly stumble downhill as they got deeper and deeper into trouble. That felt right for us. But there was no notion of killing her." He also said, "we wanted her to end the season in handcuffs, the question was what was it going to be". The writers considered many options, including killing Johnny Crowder in a public place or killing Officer Nick Mooney. The writers then came up with the idea of moving a corpse, which Yost liked because he found it "kinda gruesome, and weird, and it allowed for a lot of sick, funny jokes." When questioned about Johnny's absence in the episode, Yost explained, "there was only so much real estate in the final episode, and we really wanted to focus on Raylan and Boyd. We did let Johnny dangle. He's out there in the wind. To us, it's a good thing to have dangling in the wind. I don't know how, where or when he'll be used, but there's obviously a big X on his back, and on Mooney and Lee Paxton's backs, too." Walton Goggins teased that Boyd's and Raylan's relationship would be impacted by the season finale, "over the course of their relationship, Boyd has seen their friendship one way and Raylan has seen it as something else, and by the end of this season they may see it the same way: That is that they don't like each other."

On the limo scene, co-writer and producer Benjamin Cavell said that the writers have "gone back and forth for weeks in the writers room on how this showdown was going to end." While the writers were proud of the closure to Nicky Augustine's storyline, Yost revealed that the original plan was different. The original idea for the episode (and the season) involved Raylan teaming up with Nicky Augustine to take down Theo Tonin. Due to actor Adam Arkin working as director on The Americans and the character development for Augustine, the writers rewrote the plan. Yost complimented actor Mike O'Malley, "he was happy with the stuff that we got to do with him this year. Certainly he really enjoyed 'Decoy'. You end up with a great scene between you and the star of the show, and that's not a bad way to go on Justified. And he goes big: It's not just one person shooting him. It's a big Bonnie and Clyde moment."

For the final scene involving Boyd visiting the house, Yost said, "I think we knew that from about the midpoint of the season on. We knew we wanted to end with him there, and we wanted to have Raylan back at Arlo's house with a fresh grave. Those were goals from early on." When questioned if Raylan lived on Arlo's house, Yost explained, "we haven't resolved that. We think that's a temporary thing. The disposition of the house is something we can deal with next year."

== Reception ==
=== Viewers ===
In its original American broadcast, "Ghosts" was seen by an estimated 2.25 million household viewers and gained a 0.7 ratings share among adults aged 18–49, according to Nielsen Media Research. This means that 0.7 percent of all households with televisions watched the episode. This was a 8% decrease in viewership from the previous episode, which was watched by 2.44 million viewers with a 0.8 in the 18-49 demographics. It was also a 16% decrease in viewership from the previous season finale, which was watched by 2.66 million viewers with a 1.1 in the 18-49 demographics.

=== Critical reviews ===
"Ghosts" received universal acclaim from critics. Seth Amitin of IGN gave the episode a "masterpiece" 10 out of 10 and wrote, "While Season 4 was a little sloppy from start to finish, this was maybe the series' finest episode ever. It was smart, cruel, efficient, and well-told. It kept the series' soul intact. It twisted, turned and transformed. It reminded us just how great this show can be. It reminded us that Raylan is a difficult character, but in his old school ways, he's still consistent. He's one of the best characters on TV right now. This was Justified at its finest."

Noel Murray of The A.V. Club gave the episode an "A" grade and wrote, "Justified's fourth season started with an old crime, revealed to have been the launching-point for the criminal careers of Boyd and Raylan's fathers. Ever since, this season has considered how something that Boyd and Raylan had nothing to do with has continued to control their lives, both positively and negatively. Fate weighs heavily on this finale, too." Kevin Fitzpatrick of Screen Crush wrote, "'Ghosts' in particular feels as nuanced and well-defined as ever, needing precious few action beats to illustrate the tension of the hour, and rich character definition from Walton Goggins and Timothy Olyphant."

James Poniewozik of Time wrote, "The previous two episodes, really, wrapped up many of the season's big plot points, and the finale, 'Ghosts', didn't close with the end of a kingpin — unless you want to confer the honor on Nicky Augustine, but in the words of this episode, he was ultimately an elf, not Santa. To me, though, that has been a strength, not a weakness of this powerful season, at least the best in two years and a coin toss for me at the moment with the mighty season two. There was no big bad in season four, and as a result Justified was freer to explore the bigness of the badness within the characters we already knew." Alan Sepinwall of HitFix wrote, "Raylan's a fast gun, super-cool and great with a quip, but ultimately, he's a tragic character. And I appreciate that after all the capers and double crosses of the last two seasons, Justified pauses at the end to remind us of that."

Rachel Larimore of Slate called the episode a "pretty-darn-perfect episode." Joe Reid of Vulture gave the episode a perfect 5 star rating out of 5 and wrote, "This is currently a show that is solidly (and justifiably) confident in its characters, to the point where life-or-death suspense doesn't even have to be at the end of a gun barrel." Maureen Ryan of The Huffington Post wrote, "I may have found the middle section of the season's Drew plot a bit dense for my taste, but this was, overall, an excellent, enjoyable season with many high points."

Emily VanDerWerff of Grantland wrote, "'Ghosts' is a surprisingly muted finale, but it's the right choice for this season, which built up a good head of steam, let most of it blow off in episode 11, then spent the last two episodes picking up the pieces. If 'Decoy' was a new high-water mark for the show, that's because it's so immediately visceral and fun to watch. 'Peace of Mind' and 'Ghosts', on the other hand, take the other tack, trading in the action-movie plotting and balls-out excitement of 'Decoy' for thematic contemplation and brooding emotionalism." Dan Forcella of TV Fanatic gave the episode a perfect 5 star rating out of 5 and wrote, "Between Raylan's and Boyd's arcs, 'Ghosts' gave us multiple climactic moments, satisfying endings to the stories we've watch unfold this season, while setting things up for next year's stretch of episodes. Unsurprisingly, the show's innate ability to create fabulous characters, and tell great stories, once again made Justified one of if not THE best dramas on television this year." Jack McKinney of Paste gave the episode a 9.5 out of 10 and wrote, "Four seasons down, and I still have no damn idea where this show is going to go from week to week. Every single (and I say this with complete and utter joy) prediction I made about this week's finale was not merely wrong, but embarrassingly, maddeningly wrong. I couldn't be happier."
