= Kin (Justified) =

- Justified episode
- Episode no.: Season 4 Episode 5
- Directed by: Peter Werner
- Written by: Fred Golan & VJ Boyd
- Cinematography by: Francis Kenny
- Editing by: Harvey Rosenstock
- Original air date: February 5, 2013
- Running time: 40 minutes

Guest appearances
- Patton Oswalt as Constable Bob Sweeney; Jere Burns as Wynn Duffy; Ron Eldard as Colton "Colt" Rhodes; Jim Beaver as Sheriff Shelby Parlow; Bonita Friedericy as Mary; Rick Gomez as AUSA David Vasquez; Gerald McRaney as Josiah Cairn; David Meunier as Johnny Crowder; Abby Miller as Ellen May; Mike O'Malley as Nick "Nicky" Augustine; Romy Rosemont as Sonya Gable; Stephen Tobolowsky as Agent Jerry Barkley; Alexandra Kyle as Roz; Tom E. Proctor as Cope; Christopher Douglas Reed as Daniel; Natalie Zea as Winona Hawkins; Raymond J. Barry as Arlo Givens

Episode chronology
← Previous "This Bird Has Flown"	Next → "Foot Chase"
- Justified (season 4)

"Kin" is the fifth episode of the fourth season of the American Neo-Western television series Justified. It is the 44th overall episode of the series and was written by executive producer Fred Golan and story editor VJ Boyd and directed by Peter Werner. It originally aired on FX on February 5, 2013.

The series is based on Elmore Leonard's stories about the character Raylan Givens, particularly "Fire in the Hole", which serves as the basis for the episode. The series follows Raylan Givens, a tough deputy U.S. Marshal enforcing his own brand of justice. The series revolves around the inhabitants and culture in the Appalachian Mountains area of eastern Kentucky, specifically Harlan County where many of the main characters grew up. In the episode, Raylan realizes that Arlo intends to use his knowledge of Drew Thompson to be released from prison and sets out to find him first. Boyd is also looking for Drew Thompson while Colt struggles in finding Ellen May.

According to Nielsen Media Research, the episode was seen by an estimated 2.42 million household viewers and gained a 0.9 ratings share among adults aged 18–49. The episode received very positive reviews from critics, who praised the writing, character development and cliffhanger.

== Plot ==
After Ellen May (Abby Miller) disappears, Colt (Ron Eldard) uses his military police status to gain access to the grocery store's surveillance cameras. Footage shows Ellen May walking off the camera's range and a police cruiser entering the frame.

Raylan (Timothy Olyphant) accompanies Winona (Natalie Zea) to the doctor's office for an ultrasound but he is forced to leave when Rachel (Erica Tazel) calls him. Arlo (Raymond J. Barry) has been taken to the office, where he intends to hand them Drew Thompson in exchange for early release. This infuriates FBI Agent Barkley (Stephen Tobolowsky) and motivates Raylan to find Thompson first as he wants Arlo to stay in prison. Barkley later meets with Duffy (Jere Burns) and criminal Nick "Nicky" Augustine (Mike O'Malley), revealing that he is on their payroll. When he finds that the FBI no longer investigates Thompson, Nicky kills Barkley and assigns Duffy to find Thompson for his employer, Theo Tonin.

Colt questions Shelby (Jim Beaver) about being involved in Ellen May's disappearance but Shelby claims not to be involved. He returns to the bar, where he lies to Boyd (Walton Goggins) by telling him that he killed Ellen May. Duffy shows up at the bar and offers money to Boyd if he can find Drew Thompson. Bob (Patton Oswalt) later calls Raylan as he arrested Roz (Alexandra Kyle). Raylan allows her to go if he can help him with Thompson's location. Roz states that she was sent by her step-father Josiah Cairn (Gerald McRaney) to retrieve the bag from Arlo's dilapidated house. Raylan forces Cairn (who is under house arrest) to confess everything he knows; Cairn reveals that Thompson broke his legs while jumping out of a plane and asked for help from Arlo and Bo Crowder, who sent him to live with the "hill people" so that he could recover while hiding.

Raylan notifies Tim (Jacob Pitts) of his location and goes into the woods, where he is taken by the hill people. They lock Raylan in a barn and it is revealed that Boyd is also locked there. Boyd is taken out of the barn but he overcomes his captors and allows Raylan to escape and get a rifle. The hill's leader, Cope (Tom E. Proctor), arrives and takes them hostage again. Raylan claims to be kin of them, as his mother's cousin Mary (Bonita Friedericy) is part of the hill people. Mary recognizes Raylan and allows him and Boyd to go, telling them that Drew Thompson left the hill years ago. Raylan leaves Boyd handcuffed on a tree and leaves with Tim, who was talking with Colt in the outskirts of the colony about their military services.

After being released, Boyd calls Duffy for a new deal, in which he will bring him Thompson within a week in exchange for half of Kentucky's heroin business. Duffy agrees, but he tells Johnny (David Meunier) that when Boyd finds Thompson, he will have permission to kill him. Boyd also meets with Arlo's attorney, Sonya Gable (Romy Rosemont) and bribes her to tell him everything she knows about Arlo's statements. Colt once again visits Shelby for Ellen May's whereabouts. Shelby claims that his officers saw her boarding a truck, possibly heading to Tennessee. After Colt leaves, Shelby is revealed to be giving asylum to Ellen May, who now knows that Boyd and Ava (Joelle Carter) wanted to kill her and agrees to help Shelby in taking Boyd down. Raylan visits Cairn again at night, but finds his ankle monitor removed. He questions how he wasn't alerted and is then shocked to find Cairn's severed foot.

== Production ==
=== Development ===
In January 2013, it was reported that the fifth episode of the fourth season would be titled "Kin", and was to be directed by Peter Werner and written by executive producer Fred Golan and story editor VJ Boyd.

=== Writing ===
Series developer Graham Yost teased that Arlo's actions in "Hole in the Wall" would heavily impact the season starting on this episode, confirming Barry's return after a brief hiatus. Yost commented on the progress on the Drew Thompson storyline, "We just liked the idea in episode 5 of kicking the Drew Thompson mystery up another notch. Raylan in episode 4 was dealing with Lindsey and Randall, and now he's back on the job that he should be doing. And Boyd and Ava, having had their adventures with Preacher Billy and Cassie and the threat with Ellen May, as far as they know, they're done with all that, and now they can focus on the hunt for Drew Thompson as well."

The episode featured Winona's return to the series. Yost said, "We just couldn't imagine why Winona was still hanging by Raylan if his life was this dangerous and that's not what she wanted. It also gave us a chance to make Raylan a ladies' man." Star Natalie Zea commented, "I think in some shape or form, they will always be together. Whether that means they're physically part of some exclusive union, I don't know. That obviously hasn't worked well for them."

=== Casting ===
The episode was Natalie Zea's first episode of the season and the second overall as guest star. This was due to Zea's commitment to new series The Following. Yost said, "We're feverishly negotiating with Natalie Zea and the people who are scheduling The Following to make sure we can get her back at least once." The episode also had Patton Oswalt returning as Constable Bob Sweeney, whose return was teased by Yost.

In January 2013, it was announced that Mike O'Malley was joining the series in the recurring role of Nick "Nicky" Augustine, "a proxy to mobster Theo Tonin." The role was originally intended for Theo Tonin, played by Adam Arkin in the series. However, due to Arkin's directorial commitment to The Americans, the writers created Nicky.

=== Filming ===
All of Gerald McRaney's scenes in the episode were filmed in a single day.

== Reception ==
=== Viewers ===
In its original American broadcast, "Kin" was seen by an estimated 2.42 million household viewers and gained a 0.9 ratings share among adults aged 18–49, according to Nielsen Media Research. This means that 0.9 percent of all households with televisions watched the episode. This was a 16% increase in viewership from the previous episode, which was watched by 2.08 million viewers with a 0.9 in the 18-49 demographics.

=== Critical reviews ===
"Kin" received very positive reviews from critics. Seth Amitin of IGN gave the episode a "great" 8.5 out of 10 and wrote, "Overall, 'Kin' sent us back to what makes Justified great: slice of life Kentucky, greater plots at hand building toward something, the drug business in rural and city Kentucky and development of great characters. There's a lot of good stuff to go in this season and now that I see the clearer vision for where Season 4 is heading, it looks like it's going to be a good one."

Scott Tobias of The A.V. Club gave the episode an "A−" grade and wrote, "The flexibility of family ties is a major element of 'Kin'. Raylan ultimately skips out on a chance to see the latest ultrasound of his child because he gets some news about his own father, who's about to be released from prison if he can hand over Drew Thompson to the FBI." Kevin Fitzpatrick of Screen Crush wrote, "'Kin' escalates the season's pace significantly, and provides a big improvement over the previous four episodes, even finding ways to include Winona! To be fair, the first four episodes of the season still crackled with Justified's usual dialogue and a number of intriguing characters, but a repositioning episode like 'Kin' sets a much higher standard for the season going forward."

Alan Sepinwall of HitFix wrote, "There's restraint at work even in an episode like this that's overflowing with memorable performances and big plot moves, and I am very excited to see what happens next – and who turns up to be a part of it." Rachel Larimore of Slate wrote, "For the second week in a row, we end on a mysterious disappearance. I think, as with Ellen May, we're not supposed to know yet whether he ran off or was taken. I suspect either Thompson came to get him, or he's so afraid of Thompson that he made a run for it. On foot."

Mandl Blerly of Entertainment Weekly wrote, "Are there Team Raylan and Team Boyd T-shirts and mugs? Because after this episode, the battle lines have officially been drawn (again). Though this being Justified, we suspect they'll curve (again)." Joe Reid of Vulture gave the episode a perfect 5 star rating out of 5 and wrote, "I love that a show like Justified can be at the top of its game while delivering nothing more than a story line bridge of an episode, taking us to the next level of the Drew Thompson story line, transitioning Ellen May's disappearance into the next threat to Boyd Crowder, and, as always, putting Wynn Duffy in a position where both Boyd and Raylan are going to be coming after him soon. That guy is a glutton for punishment."

Dan Forcella of TV Fanatic gave the episode a 4.5 star rating out of 5 and wrote, "Justified continued its strong fourth season with the help of some of its friends in 'Kin'. Whether it was those we knew, a la Agent Barkley and Constable Bob, or fresh faces like Mike O'Malley and Gerald McRaney, the onslaught of guest stars was a welcome treat as the search from Drew Thompson continued." Jack McKinney of Paste gave the episode an 8.7 out of 10 rating and wrote, "The entire scene, with the two of them working together while simultaneously trying to double-cross each other was a microcosm of their complete history. Fun stuff. It worked out well in the end and was worth our patience, but hopefully we won't have to wait so long for their next encounter."
