= Money Trap (Justified) =

- Justified episode
- Episode no.: Season 4 Episode 7
- Directed by: Don Kurt
- Story by: Elmore Leonard & Chris Provenzano
- Teleplay by: Chris Provenzano
- Cinematography by: Francis Kenny
- Editing by: Keith Henderson
- Original air date: February 19, 2013
- Running time: 40 minutes

Guest appearances
- Ron Eldard as Colton "Colt" Rhodes; Sam Anderson as Lee Paxton; David Andrews as Tillman Napier; Chris Chalk as Jody Adair; Kevin Daniels as Mitch; Michael Gladis as Kenneth; Shelley Hennig as Jackie Nevada; Brian Howe as Arnold; David Meunier as Johnny Crowder; Robin Riker as Deborah Jane; Aja Evans as Sharon Edmunds; Ned Bellamy as Gerald Johns; Grainger Hines as Sam; Clayton Rohner as Man at the party; Raymond J. Barry as Arlo Givens

Episode chronology
← Previous "Foot Chase"	Next → "Outlaw"
- Justified (season 4)

"Money Trap" is the seventh episode of the fourth season of the American Neo-Western television series Justified. It is the 46th overall episode of the series and was written by producer Chris Provenzano from a story by Provenzano and executive producer Elmore Leonard and directed by co-executive producer Don Kurt. It originally aired on FX on February 19, 2013.

The series is based on Elmore Leonard's stories about the character Raylan Givens, particularly "Fire in the Hole", which serves as the basis for the episode. The series follows Raylan Givens, a tough deputy U.S. Marshal enforcing his own brand of justice. The series revolves around the inhabitants and culture in the Appalachian Mountains area of eastern Kentucky, specifically Harlan County where many of the main characters grew up. In the episode, Raylan must find Jody Adair again after he kills his former acquaintance and her partner. Meanwhile, Boyd and Ava attend a swinger party to find Drew Thompson.

According to Nielsen Media Research, the episode was seen by an estimated 2.15 million household viewers and gained a 0.8 ratings share among adults aged 18–49. The episode received positive reviews from critics, who praised the character development although the pace and lack of plot advancement was criticized.

== Plot ==
6 days earlier, Raylan (Timothy Olyphant) delivers Jody Adair (Chris Chalk) to Sharon (Aja Evans) and her partner Mitch (Kevin Daniels). During their transportation, the van blows a tire and Sharon uses the opportunity to go into the woods to urinate. While Mitch prepares to change the tire, a man named Kenneth (Michael Gladis) pulls up but Mitch threatens him to leave. However, Jody breaks free and strangles Mitch to death. He later finds Sharon in the woods and he shoots her in the neck, killing her.

In present day, Raylan is notified by the local police of Sharon's death and sets out to find Jody. Jody has been living with Kenneth, who helped pop the tire to enable Jody’s escape, during this time and decides to talk to his ex-wife. They sneak in her house, but find that Raylan is already there and is questioning her house sitter and friend Jackie Nevada (Shelley Hennig), forcing them to leave. Meanwhile, after sleeping with Teri, Johnny (David Meunier) deduces that Colt (Ron Eldard) attacked her. He also discovers that he was looking for Ellen May, realizing that he lied about killing her.

Boyd (Walton Goggins) and Ava (Joelle Carter) attend a swinger party hosted by Tillman Napier (David Andrews) in order to find anyone that could fit Drew Thompson's real identity. Ava feels uncomfortable at the party and Boyd defends her when two men approach her for sexual interest. Boyd meets Lee Paxton (Sam Anderson) and Gerald Johns (Ned Bellamy), who want him to dispatch one of the attendees in order to benefit from government funds. Boyd refuses but they threaten that they will use their influence to shut down his brothel if he refuses.

Raylan takes Jackie to her house. After he leaves, Jody is revealed to be hiding at the house and demands that she hand over his ex-wife's security code. But Raylan recognizes that he is in the house and returns to confront him. Jody holds a knife to Jackie's throat but she breaks loose after smashing a glass on his head, forcing him to escape by jumping through a window. After arresting Kenneth at his apartment, Raylan eventually finds Jody at the bar below where Raylan lives, and shoots him in a standoff, killing him. He accompanies Jackie to a hotel room, where he realizes Jody was going after money and not his ex-wife.

At the bar, Johnny talks with Colt, although he does not mention his knowledge of him failing to kill Ellen May. The next day, Raylan visits Arlo (Raymond J. Barry) in prison. Raylan tells him he will get him transferred to a country club prison if Arlo tells him where Drew is and that's the best deal Raylan is willing to offer. Arlo coldly dismisses the offer. Raylan leaves his dad after telling his dad that he is on his way to see the ex-sheriff Hunter Mosley. Before leaving, he tells Arlo he will not live long and he will be glad to hear the news when Arlo is pronounced dead.

== Production ==
=== Development ===
In January 2013, it was reported that the seventh episode of the fourth season would be titled "Money Trap", and was to be directed by co-executive producer Don Kurt and written by producer Chris Provenzano from a story by Provenzano and executive producer Elmore Leonard.

=== Writing ===
Jackie Nevada's storyline was adapted from Elmore Leonard's 2012 novel Raylan. Series developer Graham Yost said, "That's a chunk from the book that Tim [Olyphant] wanted to try to get in last year, and we couldn't fit it in. So it's been a target for quite some time."

The episode marked the return of Jody Adair, previously seen on "Hole in the Wall", which was teased by Yost.

=== Casting ===
Despite being credited, Erica Tazel does not appear in the episode as her respective character.

In December 2012, Sam Anderson joined the series in the recurring role of Lee Paxton, "a rugged and manipulative funeral director who crosses paths with (and confides in) Boyd."

== Reception ==
=== Viewers ===
In its original American broadcast, "Money Trap" was seen by an estimated 2.15 million household viewers and gained a 0.8 ratings share among adults aged 18–49, according to Nielsen Media Research. This means that 0.8 percent of all households with televisions watched the episode. This was a 7% decrease in viewership from the previous episode, which was watched by 2.30 million viewers with a 0.9 in the 18–49 demographics.

=== Critical reviews ===
"Money Trap" received positive reviews from critics. Seth Amitin of IGN gave the episode a "great" 8.3 out of 10 and wrote, "Regardless of where the season goes from here or what it focuses on, 'Money Trap' was a very good episode in the catalog of a great series."

Zack Handlen of The A.V. Club gave the episode a "B" grade and wrote, "One thing you learn straight away when reviewing Justified for the first time: There are a lot of characters on this show, and nearly all of them are worth talking about, and that means tracking down names and trying to remember who did what when, and it can just be a huge pain in the ass. Worth it, though." Kevin Fitzpatrick of Screen Crush wrote, "Suffice to say, it wasn't hard to figure out after season 4 premiere 'Hole in the Wall' that we'd be seeing Jody again, though 'Money Trap' seems especially self-aware as an episode designed to dance around the Drew Thompson mystery with a side-story."

Alan Sepinwall of HitFix wrote, "'Money Trap' wasn't as busy as last week's episode, yet parts of it – particularly on the Raylan vs. Jody end of things – still felt more rushed than they needed to be." Rachel Larimore of Slate wrote, "The movers and shakers gather for some moving and shaking in Clover Hill."

Joe Reid of Vulture gave the episode a 3 star rating out of 5 and wrote, "It's almost like Elmore Leonard loaned out Raylan Givens to Graham Yost and FX with the caveat that every season, they have to make an episode that feels more like outtakes from Out of Sight than an actual Justified episode. I'm not exactly complaining — these episodes are almost always a great time. But there's something about being yanked out of the narrative of a season that has always seemed showy to me." Dan Forcella of TV Fanatic gave the episode a 4 star rating out of 5 and wrote, "For maybe the first time in three and a half seasons watching Justified, I thought to myself, this doesn't make much sense at all. The rest of the hour was enjoyable enough to make 'Money Trap' another quality hour of television, but I can't help but worry about how many more times they will attempt to do something similar." Jack McKinney of Paste gave the episode a 9 rating out of 10 and wrote, "I would be remiss if I didn't also mention director (and co-executive producer) Don Kurt and writer Chris Provenzano. Both turned in choice work here and deserve some notice."
