= Money Trap =

Money Trap may refer to:

- Money Trap (film), a 2019 Turkish comedy film
- "Money Trap" (Justified), an episode of the television series Justified
- The Money Trap, a 1965 film
