= Richard Crudo =

American cinematographer and director

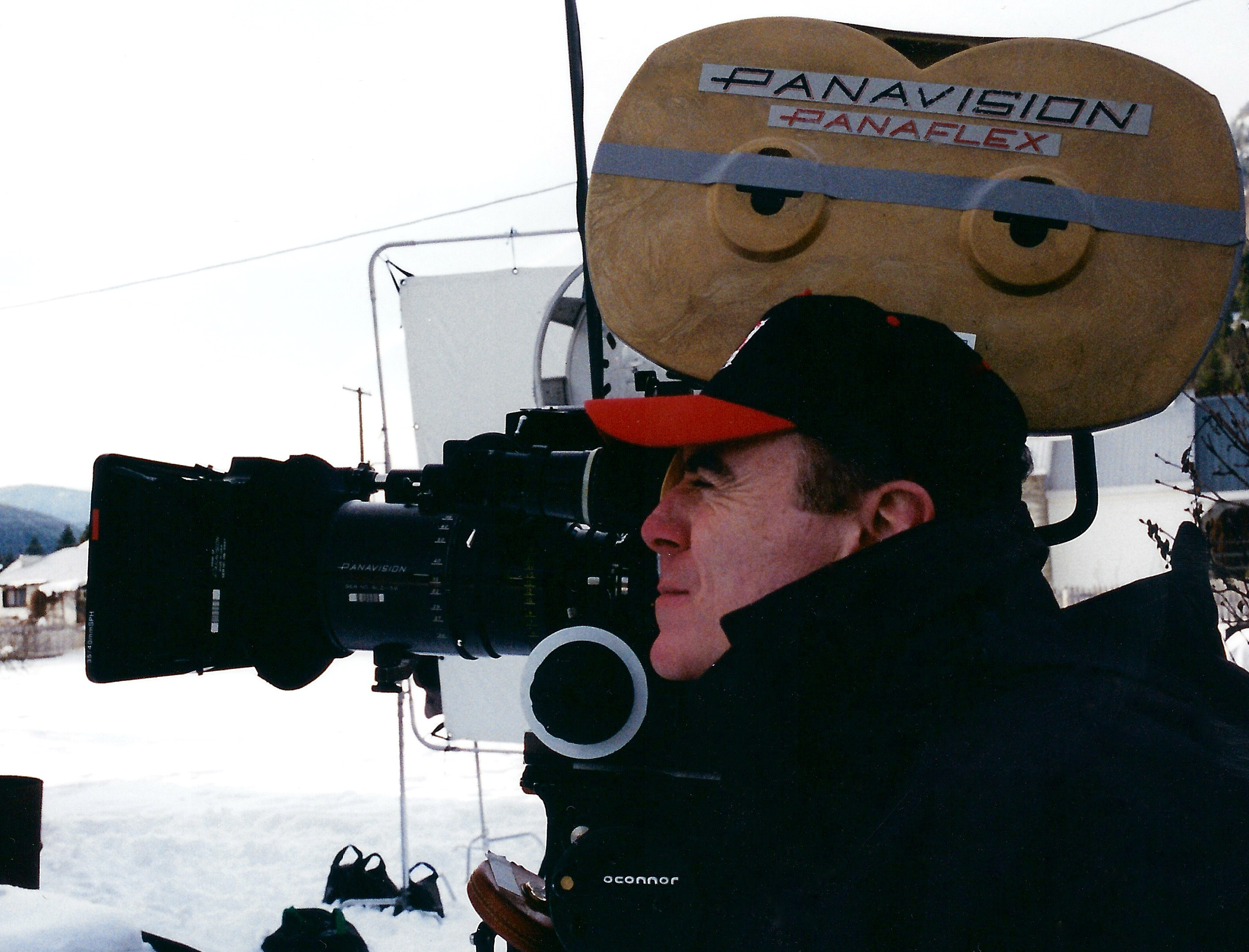
- Richard Crudo, ASC, American Cinematographer and Director
- Born: Brooklyn, New York, USA
- Occupations: Cinematographer and Director
- Organization(s): American Society of Cinematographers; President: 2003-2006, 2013-2016; Board of Governors: 2002-2006, 2007-2010, 2011-2014, 2015-2017

Richard Crudo, A.S.C. is an American cinematographer and director. He is a 6-term past-president of the American Society of Cinematographers.

== Life and career ==
Born and raised in Brooklyn, New York, cinematographer\director Richard Crudo, ASC's lengthy resume includes such notable feature credits as Federal Hill, American Buffalo, Outside Providence, American Pie, Down To Earth, Out Cold, Grind and Brooklyn Rules. Each was singled out by critics for its excellence in cinematography.

On the television side, he has shot numerous episodes of FX Network's Justified, The CW’s Jane the Virgin, MTV's Awkward and CBS's SWAT. He has also contributed to such series as Good Girls Revolt and Doubt (Amazon), Greenleaf (OWN), Sweet Vicious (MTV) and NCIS, Tommy and Why Women Kill (CBS).

More recently, Mr. Crudo photographed the pilot episode of Federal Hill: The Beginning. Executive Produced by Terence Winter (creator of Boardwalk Empire, writer\producer of The Sopranos & The Wolf of Wall Street), it saw him reunited with longtime collaborator, writer\director Michael Corrente. He also shot the pilot episode of Executive Producer David E. Kelley's ABC series, Avalon and in the fall of 2024 shot The Weight, a feature film directed by Sallyanne Massimini.

Mr. Crudo is a six-term Past President of the American Society of Cinematographers and served for three years as a Governor of the Academy of Motion Picture Arts and Sciences. He is a frequent guest lecturer at universities across the United States and is a regular contributor to American Cinematographer magazine and other industry publications. He is also a leading proponent in the industry’s drive to establish standards for digital imaging workflow. His twice-weekly blog - www.normalexposure.com - addresses issues pertaining to cinematography.

Other professional affiliations include memberships in the Academy of Television Arts and Sciences, the International Cinematographers Guild and the Society of Motion Picture and Television Engineers. In 2007 he was made a Fellow of the Royal Photographic Society. In May 2012, he was invited to become a Canon Camera Explorer of Light.

== Professional affiliations ==
Academy of Motion Picture Arts and Sciences
- Cinematographers Branch Executive Committee, 2003, 2008, 2009, 2015, 2017, 2018, 2019, 2020
- Chairman, Cinematographers Branch Executive Committee, 2012, 2013
- Board of Governors, 2011-2014 Academy of Television Arts & Sciences
- Cinematographers Branch

American Society of Cinematographers
- President, 2003–2006, 2013-2016
- Board of Governors, 2002–2006, 2007–2010, 2011–2014, 2015-2017, 2019-2022
- Vice President, 2011, 2012, 2013

Canon Camera Explorer of Light

Digital Cinema Society

International Cinematographers Guild, IATSE Local 600

National Film Preservation Board for the Library of Congress

Royal Photographic Society, Fellow

Society of Camera Operators, Associate

Society of Motion Picture and Television Engineers, Life Member

UCLA Cinematographer-in-Residence Spring Term 2011

== Filmography ==
=== Feature film ===
Year	Title	Director
1989	Title Shot	Bill Durkin
1993	Spree	Kevin Lynn
1994	Federal Hill	Michael Corrente
1994	Rave Review	Jeff Seymour
1995	The Low Life	George Hickenlooper
1995	Tilt-A-Whirl	Tom Sullivan
1996	American Buffalo	Michael Corrente
1996	Persons Unknown	George Hickenlooper
1997	The First to Go	John L. Jacobs
1998	Bongwater	Richard Sears
1998	Music from Another Room	Charlie Peters
1999	Say You'll Be Mine	Brad Kane
1999	American Pie	Paul Weitz; Chris Weitz
1999	Outside Providence	Michael Corrente
2001	Down to Earth	Paul Weitz; Chris Weitz
2001	Out Cold	The Malloys
2003	Grind	Casey La Scala
2004	Homie Spumoni	Mike Cerrone
2007	Brooklyn Rules	Michael Corrente
2007	My Sexiest Year	Howard Himelstein
2023	Wait With Me	Colleen Davie Jones

Direct-to-video

Year	Title	Director
2000	In Pursuit	Peter Pistor
2004	Bring It On Again	Damon Santostefano
2004	Out of Reach	Po-Chih Leong
2008	Pistol Whipped	Roel Reiné

=== Television ===
Year	Title	Director	Episode(s)
1995	CBS Schoolbreak Special	Matthew Diamond	"Between Mother and Daughter"
2013	Awkward	Steve Gainer	"Taking Sides"
2012	Justified	Bill Johnson	"Coalition"
2013	Justified	Lesli Linka Glatter	"The Hatchet Tour"
2013	Justified	Bill Johnson	"Ghosts"
2014	Justified	Bill Johnson	"Raw Deal"
2014	Justified	Michael Pressman	"Starvation"
2017	Jane the Virgin	Anna Mastro	"Chapter Fifty-Nine"
2017	Jane the Virgin	Melanie Mayron	"Chapter Sixty-One"
2017	Jane the Virgin	Gina Lamar	"Chapter Sixty-Three"
2018	S.W.A.T.	Doug Aarniokoski	"Source"
2021	Interconnected	Debbie Peiser	"Don't Try This At Home"
2022	Avalon	Kate Dennis	Pilot
