= Leonard Chang =

Korean American writer

Leonard Chang is a Korean American writer of short stories and novels, as well as a screenwriter and television writer/executive producer who is known for FX's Snowfall.

== Biography ==
Born in Harlem, New York, Chang grew up on Long Island and attended the public schools of Merrick. After graduating high school, Chang studied Philosophy at Dartmouth College, interned with the Peace Corps in Kingston, Jamaica, and continued his Philosophy studies at Harvard University, where he received a Bachelor of Arts degree with honors. After college, Chang attended the Masters of Fine Arts (MFA) Graduate Creative Writing program at the University of California, Irvine. He currently lives in South L.A.

== Fiction writing ==
=== Short stories and novels ===
Chang's short stories have appeared in a variety of literary journals, including The Crescent Review, Confluence, The Literary Review, and Prairie Schooner.

His first novel was The Fruit 'N Food (1996), winner of the Black Heron Press Award for Social Fiction, a story about a loner who finds employment in a New York City grocery; major themes involve race relations and violence. His other novels include Dispatches from the Cold (1998), which won the San Francisco Bay Guardian Goldie Award for Literature.

His novel Over The Shoulder (2001), a mystery/noir, forms the first book in a trilogy about his Korean American private-eye protagonist, Allen Choice. Other novels in the "Choice" trilogy are: Underkill (2003) and Fade To Clear (2004) (a USA Today Summer Reading Pick and a finalist for the Shamus Award).

His 2009 novel, entitled Crossings brings together many of the themes and issues of his previous work, and centers around a love story between recent Korean immigrants, while tackling the harsh circumstances of illegal immigration and human trafficking.

Triplines was published in 2014 and is a highly autobiographical novel about his tumultuous childhood on Long Island.

His latest novel, entitled The Lockpicker, was published in 2017.

=== Themes ===
Chang's work is unusual in the canon of Asian American literature because of the level of assimilation many of his Korean American characters have achieved, and their connections with characters of other races and ethnicities. His protagonists tend to be second generation Americans, often linked to a diverse landscape of characters and locations, including a clerk in a Korean grocery in Queens, a working-class white man in rural New Hampshire, or a sex-trafficked young woman in Los Angeles. His crime-related works deal less with race relations than with character-driven issues, such as with Allen Choice, whose name ("Choice" changed from the Korean "Choi" by his father) denotes the shift in themes. Chang's experiments in crime fiction are related to this shift, since the stories revolve around criminals, and despite the fact that the protagonists are often Korean American, the debt here is more to crime and noir writers like Raymond Chandler, Dashiell Hammett, and Ross Macdonald. What also seems to differentiate Chang's work from others of his generation is his singular focus on detailing the Korean American experience as distinctly American. His later works tend to deal with family trauma, violence and dysfunction, and how these scars reverberate throughout the generations.

Chang's novels have been translated and published in multiple countries, and are regularly studied in literature, theology and sociology courses throughout the United States, Asia and Europe.

== Teaching ==
Chang was a faculty member at Antioch University's MFA program, and has been a Visiting Distinguished Writer at Mills College. The U.S. Consulate in Berlin also recently sponsored a multi-city lecture/reading tour of Germany where he read from his works.

== Television and film writing ==
=== TV writing ===
Chang was a writer and Executive Producer for the FX series Snowfall. He was also a writer/producer for Justified, based on various works by Elmore Leonard. He has received "written by" credits on the Justified episodes: "Burned" (2015), "Sounding" (2015), "Wrong Roads" (2014), "Peace of Mind" (2013) and "The Hatchet Tour" (2013). He has been a staff writer/story editor/co-producer on 39 other Justified episodes. He also appeared in the 2014 Justified episode "Wrong Roads" as a bartender.

Chang was a staff writer for the NBC show Awake. He has served as a staff writer for over 12 episodes and has received "written by" credits for the episodes "Turtles All The Way Down" (2012), "Say Hello To My Little Friend" (2012), and "Nightswimming" (2012).

He was recently an Executive Producer and Showrunner for the Netflix comedy The Vince Staples Show.

=== Film writing ===
Chang has written a number of feature film screenplays, including adaptations of his novels Over The Shoulder, Dispatches from the Cold, and Triplines.

== Bibliography ==
- The Lockpicker (2017)
- Triplines (2014)
- Crossings (2009)
- Fade to Clear (2004)
- Underkill (2003)
- Over the Shoulder (2001)
- Dispatches from the Cold (1998)
- The Fruit 'N Food (1996)
