= Bill Johnson (filmmaker) =

American film editor and director

- Occupation(s): Film editor, television director, television editor
- Years active: 1986–present

Bill Johnson is an American film editor, television director and television editor.

In his career, he has edited episodes of Ally McBeal, Robbery Homicide Division, Karen Sisco, Kidnapped, Shark, The Beast and Entourage. He also edited episodes of The West Wing, House and Justified, as well as directing at least one episode of those series and numerous episodes for the latter.

In 2001, Johnson won a Primetime Emmy Award for editing The West Wing episode "Two Cathedrals". He was also nominated the year before, for editing the episode "In Excelsis Deo".

His film editing credits include The Manhattan Project (1986), Something Wild (1986), Married to the Mob (1988) and Miami Blues (1990). He worked as an associate/assistant editor on all of the aforementioned films. As a head editor, he worked on the films Mystery Science Theater 3000: The Movie (1996), Infinity (1996) starring Matthew Broderick (the film was also Broderick's directorial debut), and Cruel Intentions 2 (2000).
