= Ron Eldard =

American actor (active 1989–2018) (born 1965)

- Born: Ronald Jason Eldard; Long Island, New York, U.S.
- Education: State University of New York, Purchase (BFA)
- Occupation: Actor
- Years active: 1989–2018

Ronald Jason Eldard is an American former actor. As of 2026, his last television appearance was a recurring role in the 2013 season of Justified, with his last film being the lead role in Higher Power (2018).

== Early life ==
Eldard was born on Long Island, New York. He is the sixth of seven children, and has four sisters and two brothers. He is of Irish and Scottish descent. Eldard's mother died in a car accident when he was a child, and Eldard and his siblings were sent to live with various family members. He attended grade school in Utah while living with his aunt and uncle.

== Career ==
Eldard made his film debut in the comedy True Love (1989), written and directed by Nancy Savoca, and co-starring Annabella Sciorra. This film won the Grand Jury Prize at the Sundance Film Festival. Eldard has performed on Broadway in critically acclaimed productions of On the Waterfront, Biloxi Blues, Bash: Latterday Plays, and Death of a Salesman. The latter two were filmed for Showtime productions.

Eldard is known for his film roles as Mickey Bunce in the cult comedy Drop Dead Fred (1991); as street thug John Reilly in Sleepers (1996), and as Dodge, a Marine Salvage Expert, in the horror film Ghost Ship (2002).

Beginning January 11, 2006, he starred as Father Flynn in the Tony Award– and Pulitzer Prize–winning Broadway production of Doubt, opposite the British actress Dame Eileen Atkins. He was scheduled to assume the role for the January 10 performance, but was ill. The production closed July 2, 2006. In 2014, he starred in the indie horror film Poker Night.

== Personal life ==
Eldard was in a relationship with his ER co-star Julianna Margulies from 1991 to 2003.

== Filmography ==
Year	Title	Role	Notes
1989	True Love	Michael	
1989	One Life to Live	"Blade"	Television series
1991	Drop Dead Fred	Mickey Bunce	
1992	Jumpin' Joe	Joe Dugan	Television film
1992	Arresting Behavior	Officer Donny Walsh	Television series
1992	Scent of a Woman	Officer Gore	
1993	TriBeCa	Phil	Television series
1993–1994	Bakersfield P.D.	Detective Wade Preston	Television series
1995	Sex & the Other Man	Bill Jameson	
1995	The Last Supper	Pete	
1995–1996	ER	Paramedic Ray "Shep" Shepard	Television series
1996	Bastard Out of Carolina	Glen Waddell	
1996	Sleepers	John Reilly	
1996–1997	Men Behaving Badly	Kevin Murphy	Television series
1998	Deep Impact	Oren Monash	
1998	When Trumpets Fade	Private / Sergeant / Lieutenant David Manning	Television film
1999	Homicide: Life on the Street	Emmet Carey	Television series
1999	Delivered	Reed	aka Death by Pizza
1999	The Runner	Edward Harrington	
1999	Mystery, Alaska	Matt "Skank" Marden	
2000	Death of a Salesman	Biff Loman	Television film
2001	Bash: Latter-Day Plays		Television film
2001	Black Hawk Down	Chief Warrant Officer Michael Durant	
2002	Just a Kiss	Dag	
2002	Ghost Ship	Dodge	
2003	House of Sand and Fog	Deputy Sheriff Lester Burdon	
2005	Fathers and Sons	Tom	Television film
2005	Blind Justice	Detective Jim Dunbar	Television series
2006	Freedomland	Danny Martin	
2006	Diggers	Jack	
2007	Demons	Gus	Television film
2007	Already Dead	Thomas Archer	
2008	The Tenth Circle	Daniel Stone	Television film
2009	Law & Order: Special Victims Unit	Geno Parnell	Television series
2011	In Plain Sight	Carl Harris	Television series
2011	Super 8	Louis Dainard	
2011	Roadie	Jimmy Testagross	
2013	Justified	Colton "Colt" Rhodes	Television series
2013	Jobs	Rod Holt	
2014	Poker Night	Cunningham	
2018	Odds Are...	The Homeowner	
2018	Higher Power	Joe Steadman	
