= David Meunier =

American actor (born 1973)

- Born: February 5, 1973 (age 53); Portland, Oregon, U.S.
- Education: University of California, Santa Barbara, University of Toulouse-Le Mirail, University of Provence Aix-Marseille I, Santa Barbara City College
- Occupation: Actor
- Years active: 1994–present
- Spouse: Faline England

David Meunier (French pronunciation: [mønje]; born 05 February 1973) is a Luxembourgish-American actor known for his portrayals of Johnny Crowder in the FX Series Justified, Slavi in Denzel Washington's The Equalizer, and Roy Kovic in Aquarius with David Duchovny.

== Early life ==
Meunier was born in Portland, Oregon. Cast as Nathan Detroit in a school production of Guys and Dolls he fell in love with acting. Meunier later moved to California to attend university; he also attended schools in France.

== Career ==
Meunier portrayed Johnny Crowder on the television series Justified, and has had roles in series such as Revolution and Jericho. He appeared in the 2014 film adaptation of the 1980s television series The Equalizer. He also appeared as Lieutenant Greitzer in Pirates of the Caribbean: At World's End.

== Personal life ==
Meunier is married to actress Faline England. He reportedly speaks fluent French.

== Filmography ==
=== Film ===
Year	Title	Role	Notes
1994	The Adventures of Young Indiana Jones: Hollywood Follies	Studio Exec	Television film Credited as David Miller
2007	Pirates of the Caribbean: At World's End	Lieutenant Greitzer	Uncredited
2008	The Incredible Hulk	Soldier	Credited as David Miller
2009	The Horseman	Jacob Quinn	Short film
2009	The Night Girl	Gerry	Short film
2011	Partners	Brian Scott	Television film
2012	Envelope (film)	Lieutenant	Short film
2014	The Equalizer	Slavi	
2015	Girl on the Edge	Kyle	
2016	Kevin Hart: What Now?	Victor	
2019	Breckman Rodeo	Chucky	Television film

=== Television ===
Year	Title	Role	Notes
2000	Angel	Man #1	Episode: "Untouched"; Credited as David J. Miller
2001	Buffy the Vampire Slayer	Rat-Faced Demon	Episode: "Life Serial"; Credited as David J. Miller
2002	CSI: Crime Scene Investigation	Boyd Waldrip	Episode: "A Thousand Days on Earth"
2002	Push, Nevada	Research Drone #2	2 episodes
2004	Monk	Ray Kaspo	Episode: "Mr. Monk Goes to Jail"
2006	Charmed	Rohtul	Episode: "Payback's a Witch"
2006	The Unit	Michael Angelli	Episode: "Off the Meter"
2006–2008	Jericho	Russell	10 episodes
2007	Without a Trace	Derek	Episode: "Eating Away"
2008	CSI: Crime Scene Investigation	Barry Lawrence	Episode: "Blood Lust"
2008	In Plain Sight	Phil	Episode: "Don of the Dead"
2009	Castle	Sasha	Episode: "Deep in Death"
2009	Saving Grace	Percy Hendricks	Episode: "She's a Lump"
2010	Criminal Minds	Joseph Lanham	Episode: "Into the Woods"
2010	Human Target	Tom	Episode: "Pilot"
2010	Leverage	Pieter	Episode: "The Three-Card Monte Job"
2010	Bones	Winston Hinkle	Episode: "The Couple in the Cave"
2010	Law & Order: LA	Charles Roker	Episode: "Harbor City"
2010–2014	Justified	Johnny Crowder	37 episodes
2011	The Mentalist	Yegor Golenka	Episode: "Bloodstream"
2011	Prime Suspect	Chris Hughes	Episode: "Carnivorous Sheep"
2011	CSI: Miami	Darren Riggs	Episode: "A Few Dead Men"
2012	Nikita	Joshua	Episode: "True Believer"
2012	Revolution	Sgt. Will Strausser	6 episodes
2013	Burn Notice	Ben Snyder	Episode: "Bitter Pill"
2013	Scandal	Crosby	Episode: "Seven Fifty-Two"
2013	The Bridge	Agent Ralph Gedman	Episode: "Maria of the Desert"
2014	Legends	Richard Hubbard	3 episodes
2015	Aquarius	Roy Kovic	16 episodes
2016	Damien	Detective Shay	10 episodes
2016–2017	Arrow	Ishmael Gregor	7 episodes
2018	NCIS: Los Angeles	Barris Stone	Episode: "Outside the Lines"
2018	The Alienist (TV series)	Adam Dury	Episode: Psychopathia Sexualis
2018	Lucifer	Rex Wilson	Episode: "Once Upon a Time"
2018	Hawaii Five-0	Nikolai Malkin	Episode: "Waiho Wale Kahiko"
2018–2019	Mom	Yuri	3 episodes
2019	S.W.A.T.	Mickey	3 episodes
2019	The Blacklist	Louis T. Steinhil	2 episodes
2020	Bosch	Roy Lewis	Episode: "The Ace Hotel"
2020	Helstrom	Finn Miller / Magoth	4 episodes
2021-2022	Big Sky	Dietrich	12 episodes
2022	The Rookie	Man with Money	Episode: "Day in the Hole"
2023	NCIS	Wade Cutler	Episode: "Big Rig"
2023	Fatal Attraction	Richard Macksey	7 episodes
2024	NCIS: Hawaii	Alexi Volkoff	3 episodes
2026	9-1-1	Roman	Episode: Where There's Smoke"

=== Video games ===
Year	Title	Role	Notes
2011	L.A. Noire	Errol Schroeder	Voice
