= Contemporary Western =

Genre of fiction, primarily American, in various media

Contemporary Western is a subgenre of the Western genre, in various media, that includes contemporary settings and uses Old West themes, archetypes, and motifs. These may include a rebellious antihero, open plains and desert landscapes, and gunfights, among others. This sub-genre includes the post-Western, neo-Western, and urban Western genres that include "the cowboy cult" in a modern setting that involves the audience's feelings and understanding of Western movies. A neo-Western can be said to use Western themes set in the present day. According to Stephen Teo in Eastern Westerns: Film and Genre Outside and Inside Hollywood, there is little difference between the neo-Western and post-Western, and the terms may often be used interchangeably.

== Development ==
As early as 1929, there was talk about the need for change in Western films in order to stay relevant in then-modern America ("Tom Mix, Hoot Gibson and Ken Maynard must swap horses for aeroplanes or go to the old actors' home."). However, the rise of the contemporary Western is credited to two specific reasons. First, contemporary setting enabled the use of a higher number of potential plot-ideas, which "included everything from modern crooks and evil Nazis to high-tech cars and machine guns". Second, Gene Autry, a famous Western film star, was also a famous singer and performer. In order to use his reputation as much as possible, Republic Pictures decided that it was best for Autry to play himself, thus moving the films from the Old West into a contemporary setting. Some earlier actors, such as Ken Maynard and Hoot Gibson, sometimes starred in the films featuring modern setting, but Autry was the first actor starring in such films on a regular basis. Autry's films were also described as "crime dramas in contemporary Western setting".

Other early examples of the genre were films starring Roy Rogers which included contemporary settings with heavy reliance on traditional western characters and imagery, such as Silver Spurs (1943). His films made after 1947 are described as "almost without exception, modern-day adventure films set in the American west". Republic Pictures, which distributed a significant number of Autry's and Rogers's films, soon specialized in the contemporary Western subgenre, an example of which is also Paramount's Texas Rangers Ride Again (1940).

Beginning in the postwar era, radio dramas such as Tales of the Texas Rangers (1950–1952), with Joel McCrea, a contemporary detective drama set in Texas, featured many of the characteristics of traditional Westerns. In this period, post-Western precursors to the modern neo-Western films began to appear. This includes films such as Nicholas Ray's The Lusty Men (1952) and John Sturges's Bad Day at Black Rock (1955). Examples of the modern "first phase" of neo-Westerns include films such as Lonely Are the Brave (1962) and Hud (1963). The popularity of the subgenre has been resurgent since the release of Joel and Ethan Coen's No Country for Old Men (2007).

The subgenre can also be seen in television in shows such as Breaking Bad. According to Breaking Bad creator Vince Gilligan, "After the first Breaking Bad episode, it started to dawn on me that we could be making a contemporary Western. So you see scenes that are like gunfighters squaring off, like Clint Eastwood and Lee van Cleef—we have Walt and others like that."

Many space Westerns and science fiction Westerns can be classed within the neo-Western genre, particularly if the science fiction elements are of secondary importance to the Western characteristics of the plotlines. Some well-known examples include the original TV series Star Trek (1966–1969) and Joss Whedon's series Firefly (2002). Other kinds of science fiction Westerns, such as the film Mad Max (1979), have also become popular.

== Setting, motif and themes ==
Some neo-Westerns still take place in the American West and reveal the progression of the Old West mentality into the late 20th and early 21st centuries. This subgenre often features Old West-type characters struggling with displacement in a "civilized" world that rejects their "outdated" brand of justice. However, the contemporary Western need not be limited to the traditional American West setting. Coogan's Bluff and Midnight Cowboy are examples of urban Westerns set in New York City. The neo-Western television series Justified is set in Eastern Kentucky.

The neo-Western has three identifying themes. First is the lack of rules, with morals guided by the character's or audience's instincts of right and wrong rather than by governance. The second is characters searching for justice. The third theme, characters feeling remorse, connects the neo-Western to the broader Western genre, reinforcing a universal theme that consequences come with actions. Other conventions of the genre include "virility and thus patriarchal rights... secured through public performances of competence; and competence, in turn, is measured and proven in (successful) acts of violence." Taylor Sheridan's filmography includes many examples of what being a neo-Western means.

== List of contemporary Westerns ==
This list is not exhaustive. It includes major films and television labelled contemporary Western, neo-Western, post-Western, or urban Western. The list highlights the media released to illustrate the development of the concept over time.

=== Novels ===
- Welcome to Hard Times (1960)
- The Man Who Rode Midnight (1987)
- No Country for Old Men (2005)

=== Films ===
- Thunder Over Texas (1934)
- Under Western Stars (1938)
- Texas Rangers Ride Again (1940)
- Man from Cheyenne (1942)
- Silver Spurs (1943)
- Bells of San Angelo (1947)
- Springtime in the Sierras (1947)
- The Treasure of the Sierra Madre (1948)
- North of the Great Divide (1950)
- Heart of the Rockies (1951)
- South of Caliente (1951)
- Pals of the Golden West (1951)
- The Lusty Men (1952)
- Bad Day at Black Rock (1955)
- The Misfits (1961)
- Lonely are the Brave (1962)
- The Chase (1966)
- Hud (1963)
- Midnight Cowboy (1969)
- Dirty Harry (1971)
- Buck and the Preacher (1972)
- The Getaway (1972)
- Junior Bonner (1972)
- J. W. Coop (1972)
- Badlands (1973)
- Bring Me the Head of Alfredo Garcia (1974)
- Mr. Majestyk (1974)
- Hearts of the West (1975)
- Assault on Precinct 13 (1976)
- Comes a Horseman (1978)
- High-Ballin' (1978)
- Urban Cowboy (1980)
- Lone Wolf McQuade (1983)
- Flashpoint (1984)
- Paris, Texas (1984)
- Extreme Prejudice (1987)
- Near Dark (1987)
- Kill Me Again (1989)
- Next of Kin (1989)
- Road House (1989)
- Revenge (1990)
- Harley Davidson and the Marlboro Man (1991)
- El Mariachi (1992)
- Thunderheart (1992)
- Flesh and Bone (1993)
- Red Rock West (1993)
- Dead Man (1995)
- Desperado (1995)
- Last Man Standing (1996)
- Lone Star (1996)
- The Hi-Lo Country (1998)
- The Way of the Gun (2000)
- Once Upon a Time in Mexico (2003)
- Down in the Valley (2005)
- An Unfinished Life (2005)
- The Three Burials of Melquiades Estrada (2005)
- Brokeback Mountain (2005)
- Don't Come Knocking (2005)
- No Country for Old Men (2007)
- Shotgun Stories (2007)
- There Will Be Blood (2007)
- Gran Torino (2008)
- Ain't Them Bodies Saints (2013)
- Out of the Furnace (2013)
- Mystery Road (2013)
- Sicario (2015)
- Hell or High Water (2016)
- Lucky (2017)
- Three Billboards Outside Ebbing, Missouri (2017)
- The Rider (2017)
- Wind River (2017)
- Logan (2017)
- Bacurau (2019)
- Bull (2019)
- To Hell and Gone (2019)
- El Camino: A Breaking Bad Movie (2019)
- Let Him Go (2020)
- Nomadland (2020)
- The Quarry (2020)
- The Power of the Dog (2021)
- Cry Macho (2021)
- The Last Victim (2021)
- Nope (2022)
- Vengeance (2022)
- The Bikeriders (2023)
- Eddington (2025)
- Rebuilding (2025)
- The Rivals of Amziah King (2025)
- Violent Ends (2025)

=== Comics ===
- Bronc Peeler (1933–1938), a comic strip by Fred Harman
- Vigilante from DC Comics

=== Television ===
- Cade's County (1971–1972)
- Walker, Texas Ranger (1993–2001)
- Breaking Bad (2008–2013) and its spin-off Better Call Saul (2015–2022)
- Sons of Anarchy (2008–2014)
- Justified (2010–2015)
- Longmire (2012–2017)
- Mystery Road (2018–2020)
- Yellowstone (2018–2024)
- Too Old to Die Young (2019)
- Walker (2021–2024)
- Joe Pickett (2021–2023)
- Outer Range (2022–2024)
- Dark Winds (2022–present)
- Justified: City Primeval (2023)
- The Walking Dead (2010–2022)
- Supernatural (2005–2020)
- Territory (2024)
- Landman (2024–present)
- Marshals (2026–present)
- The Madison (2026–present)
- Lanterns (2026)
