= Collateral (Justified) =

- Justified episode
- Episode no.: Season 6 Episode 12
- Directed by: Michael Pressman
- Written by: Chris Provenzano & VJ Boyd
- Cinematography by: Andy Strahorn
- Editing by: Keith Henderson
- Original air date: April 7, 2015
- Running time: 43 minutes

Guest appearances
- Mary Steenburgen as Katherine Hale; Patton Oswalt as Constable Bob Sweeney; Shea Whigham as Hagan; Kaitlyn Dever as Loretta McCready; Jeff Fahey as Zachariah Randolph; Rick Gomez as AUSA David Vasquez; Jeffrey Pierce as Lappicola; Jonathan Tucker as Boon; Audrey Wasilewski as Lorna; Riley Bodenstab as Derrick Waters; Ryan Dorsey as Earl; Tom A. Proctor as Cope; Sam Elliott as Avery Markham

Episode chronology
← Previous "Fugitive Number One"	Next → "The Promise"
- Justified (season 6)

"Collateral" is the twelfth episode of the sixth season of the American Neo-Western television series Justified. It is the 77th overall episode of the series and was written by executive producer Chris Provenzano and producer VJ Boyd and directed by Michael Pressman. It originally aired on FX on April 7, 2015.

The series is based on Elmore Leonard's stories about the character Raylan Givens, particularly "Fire in the Hole", which serves as the basis for the episode. The series follows Raylan Givens, a tough deputy U.S. Marshal enforcing his own brand of justice. The series revolves around the inhabitants and culture in the Appalachian Mountains area of eastern Kentucky, specifically Harlan County where many of the main characters grew up. In the episode, both Raylan and Boyd close in on Ava while Avery seeks a new alliance for his business.

According to Nielsen Media Research, the episode was seen by an estimated 1.83 million household viewers and gained a 0.5 ratings share among adults aged 18–49. The episode received universal acclaim from critics, who praised the writing, the night shootout scene, character development and acting as strong points.

== Plot ==
Boyd (Walton Goggins) stops the truck driver, Hagan (Shea Whigham), ordering him to drive him somewhere. Meanwhile, Raylan (Timothy Olyphant) visits the hill people, forced off their land by mining pollution. Learning that there's bad blood over Arlo using them to move drugs up and down the mountain, Raylan signs over the deed to Arlo's place to them as restitution and to be rid of his last tie to Harlan, and continues on his way to Grubes' cabin.

At the cabin, Zachariah (Jeff Fahey) and Ava (Joelle Carter) dig a grave for Grubes, thinking the wisest thing is to lie low with six months' of supplies in the cabin. However, while finishing with digging, they hear on a police scanner that Boyd has escaped custody and deduce he will come for them, causing Ava to suffer a nervous breakdown. Duffy (Jere Burns) is released from custody and picks up his stuff from Vasquez (Rick Gomez) in the Marshal's office, stating he plans to leave Kentucky forever. Before he leaves, Vasquez questions him on the Simon Poole case. Duffy feigns ignorance and leaves the office.

Loretta (Kaitlyn Dever) and her ex-boyfriend Derrick (Riley Bodenstab) are hiding in a barn when Boon (Jonathan Tucker) finds them. Derrick tries to show his bravery but Boon shoots him in the shoulder. Vasquez becomes irate with the Marshals who have merely issued a bulletin saying Raylan's life has been threatened, and puts in a call to the FBI and a BOLO is issued on Raylan. Constable Bob Sweeney (Patton Oswalt) hears the BOLO for Raylan and calls offering his help but discovers he has already given it as Raylan borrowed his Crown Vic. Bob then is forced to take his cruiser and uses a tracker to find the car.

Duffy meets with his contact and arranges for purchase of two passports, a gun, and a dog-grooming van with a large well-hidden compartment and pays with Katherine's shoplifted diamond tennis bracelet and large engagement ring. Raylan arrives at the cabin but only finds Zachariah there, who was expecting to ambush Boyd in the cabin. Ava has run off with $1 million in a backpack, placing a call to someone to help her. She finds Bob's Crown Vic and attempts to steal it when Bob arrives and seizes the backpack, locking her in his car. However, Boyd has forced Hagan to drive him nearby and after a lengthy talk, Boyd kills Hagan by shooting him in the head.

Ava and Bob hear the gunshot and Bob sets out to investigate, leaving a handcuffed Ava in his car. Ava hears multiple gunshots and starts panicking. She manages to release herself and escapes with the backpack of money. As night falls, Boyd and Raylan find themselves in a shootout where none of them hits their intended target. After a shouting conversation, Boyd evades Raylan. Ava arrives at the bridge but is intercepted by a police cruiser. She tries to blackmail them to escape but the officers are revealed to be working for Avery (Sam Elliott) and plan to take her to him.

Avery visits Loretta at the barn and puts Derrick out of his misery. With Ava now in the way, Avery gives Loretta 30 seconds to change his mind on why he shouldn't kill her. Loretta states that Avery needs her as she knows more about the land and can work with her associates, who won't trust Avery all by himself and she offers him a partnership. Avery decides to spare her life and accepts the deal. Back in the woods, Raylan finds a seriously wounded Bob and drives him to the hospital. At the cabin, Boyd avoids Zachariah's ambush and shoots him in the leg, realizing Ava is not there. When Boyd demands her location, Zachariah reveals a bomb on his coat and detonates it, killing himself and wounding Boyd. Raylan manages to get Bob to the hospital but as he turns to leave, he is cornered and held at gunpoint by state troopers.

== Production ==
=== Development ===
In March 2015, it was reported that the twelfth episode of the sixth season would be titled "Collateral", and was to be directed by Michael Pressman and written by executive producer Chris Provenzano and producer VJ Boyd.

=== Writing ===
Star Walton Goggins struggled with the storyline involving his character and the driver, particularly during the scene where he kills him. He said, "I had a real hard time with it, because that is who Boyd represents, that's who he speaks up for when he speaks publicly and that man's issues are the issues that he fights for. I can't just arbitrarily commit that act, because that's a psychopath, and Boyd Crowder is not a psychopath. He's an outlaw, he's a villain. I get that. But he also has a moral code, and the people that he's killed in this show up until this point — aside from the pilot — were people that were trying to kill him." Casting Shea Whigham made it easier for him to prepare for the episode. Series developer Graham Yost said, "Shea just brought a truth and a weight and a reality to it that just meshed well with where Boyd was and is. So it was a tough one."

The night shootout between Raylan and Boyd was originally 8-pages long in the shooting script and involved more action. Co-producer Leonard Chang suggested that the series could apply Aristotle's Poetics for the scene, highlighting the motivations of the characters. This prompted the writers to deem it "the anagnorisis scene."

Zachariah was originally intended to die on "Burned", but the writers decided to keep him around for possible story purposes. According to Yost, "the presence of dynamite in that part of the story was important to us."

The episode was Patton Oswalt's last appearance in the series as Constable Bob Sweeney. Questioned about his fate, Yost said, "Dave Andron and I had a moment where it was all over where we went, 'Wait a second, we forgot to say that Bob's alive!' What I fell back on was two things. One is the Justified rule that unless you see someone zipped up in a body bag, they're probably okay. And the other thing was that if we had dropped a line into the final episode, it would have felt like that. It would have felt like we were just making everything seem okay. But Bob's fine."

Sam Elliott described Avery Markham as "He's aggressive in that he's in pursuit, but he is where he is now. He doesn't get out of that barn again, which is perfect, because he's in there surrounded by weed."

=== Casting ===
Despite being credited, Erica Tazel does not appear in the episode as her respective character.

== Reception ==
=== Viewers ===
In its original American broadcast, "Collateral" was seen by an estimated 1.83 million household viewers and gained a 0.5 ratings share among adults aged 18–49, according to Nielsen Media Research. This means that 0.5 percent of all households with televisions watched the episode. This was a 7% decrease in viewership from the previous episode, which was watched by 1.96 million viewers with a 0.6 in the 18-49 demographics.

=== Critical reviews ===
"Collateral" received universal acclaim from critics. Seth Amitin of IGN gave the episode a perfect "masterpiece" 10 out of 10 and wrote in his verdict, "Wow. This wasn't just a great episode, but one of the great keystones of a very good series. We could be in for a spectacular, ferocious ending to Justified - one it well deserves."

Alasdair Wilkins of The A.V. Club gave the episode an "A" grade and wrote, "In its way, 'Collateral' functions almost as a 'What if?' episode, showing us what it would look like if Raylan abandoned all vestiges of his humanity, of his sense of right and wrong. Without seeing the preview for next week, I can't say for certain if he's going to regain any of his admittedly shaky lawman's morality, but it's hard to imagine the show managing to outdo the darkness of Raylan's confrontation with Boyd on that hillside. That was a meeting of two killers, two long lost souls. That's an aspect of what Justified is, but it's not the only one. Perhaps next week's finale will show us something brighter, at least by this show's standards. If it took Bob getting shot to get Raylan back there, it might just be worth it. They do say it's darkest just before the dawn, but if 'Collateral' was the darkness, next week better have one hell of a dawn waiting for us." Damon Darlin of The New York Times wrote, "This episode did not let us down. It gave us more of Raylan than usual as he scoured the hills. His encounter with a destitute mountain man is the heart of the episode as Raylan rids himself of the last bit of his criminal family's legacy."

Alan Sepinwall of HitFix wrote, "Raylan wants Boyd dead, and Boyd wants a lot of people dead and the money in his hands, and there's a much harder edge to their dialogue than there's ever been before on the show. Which is about how it should be, with the end only a week away. It's been a lot of fun watching these two circle each other for years, but a time comes when one or both of them is likely to end up in the ground. That's serious business, and Justified is acknowledging that as it makes last-minute preparations for however this story will end." Jeff Stone of IndieWire gave the episode an "A" grade and wrote, "Ava's only able to get away when Boyd shows up, and even then she gets picked up by Markham's crooked cops. Now Markham's got the one thing Boyd and Raylan want most, other than each other dead. Time for a showdown."

Kyle Fowle of Entertainment Weekly wrote, "In completely relative terms, the penultimate episode of Justified, 'Collateral', is a bit of a cool-down episode, the kind of episode that spends a bit more time ruminating before heading into what's sure to be a bloody finale. With that said though, this is still Justified, which means that even the cool-down episodes are packed to the brim with high-stakes chases and the establishing of brand new consequences." Matt Zoller Seitz of Vulture gave the episode a perfect 5 star rating out of 5 and wrote, "It's fitting that so much of Justified's second-to-last episode 'Collateral' takes place on a desolate, wooded mountain haunted by the ghosts of an old way of life, one that used to be driven by rural traditions and old-fashioned, digger-driven mining." Neely Tucker of The Washington Post wrote, "So, that's it, really. Ho hum. Not much to... TARNATION, JUSTIFIED!!!! Why are you ending? How can next week be it? You can seriously wrap up Wynn, Boyd, Raylan, Ava, Avery and the feds all angling for those duffel bags with $10 million in ONE SHOW? Because that’s the delish ending that appears to be in the offing: Everybody and his brother headed up the mountain to get the money. It’s going to be like 'It's a Mad, Mad, Mad, Mad World', only with guns and ganja. Wheeee!"

James Queally of Los Angeles Times wrote, "On a second watch, I realized how necessary this episode was. In all the chaos of the last two or three episodes, we haven't had time to return to the central questions that drive this show. Is Raylan a lawman, or is his badge the only thing that keeps him from turning into another version of Boyd Crowder? Has Boyd accepted that he's the villain of his own story, or does he still see himself as more Robin Hood than Jesse James?" Sean McKenna of TV Fanatic gave the episode a 4.5 star rating out of 5 and wrote, "It was bittersweet watching the penultimate episode of the series, knowing Justified is coming to a close, but this season has been top-notch from the characters, story, writing and acting. It's certainly looking like it's going to go out with a satisfying bang." Jack McKinney of Paste gave the episode a 9.2 out of 10 and wrote, "This episode certainly lives up to its 'First Half' responsibilities. It is a painfully fast hour that leaves me wondering if my biggest complaint with the final episode next week may be that it simply went by too quickly."
