= Restitution (disambiguation) =

Restitution is a legal remedy taking away a benefit wrongfully obtained.

Restitution may also refer to:

- Crime victims' compensation
- "Restitution" (Justified), 2014 television episode
- Restitution (theology)
