= Fugitive Number One =

- Justified episode
- Episode no.: Season 6 Episode 11
- Directed by: Jon Avnet
- Written by: Taylor Elmore & Keith Schreier
- Cinematography by: Stefan von Bjorn
- Editing by: Eric L. Beason
- Original air date: March 31, 2015
- Running time: 44 minutes

Guest appearances
- Mary Steenburgen as Katherine Hale; Kaitlyn Dever as Loretta McCready; Jeff Fahey as Zachariah Randolph; Rick Gomez as AUSA David Vasquez; Justin Welborn as Carl; Jonathan Tucker as Boon; Louis Herthum as Detective Willits; Jonathan Kowalsky as Mike; Ryan Dorsey as Earl; Mel Fair as Nelson Dunlop; Chad Todhunter as Deputy Stiles; Sam Elliott as Avery Markham

Episode chronology
← Previous "Trust"	Next → "Collateral"
- Justified (season 6)

"Fugitive Number One" is the eleventh episode of the sixth season of the American Neo-Western television series Justified. It is the 76th overall episode of the series and was written by executive producer Taylor Elmore and Keith Schreier and directed by Jon Avnet. It originally aired on FX on March 31, 2015.

The series is based on Elmore Leonard's stories about the character Raylan Givens, particularly "Fire in the Hole", which serves as the basis for the episode. The series follows Raylan Givens, a tough deputy U.S. Marshal enforcing his own brand of justice. The series revolves around the inhabitants and culture in the Appalachian Mountains area of eastern Kentucky, specifically Harlan County where many of the main characters grew up. In the episode, the Marshals have set a search for Ava after she shot Boyd and stole Avery's $10 million.

According to Nielsen Media Research, the episode was seen by an estimated 1.96 million household viewers and gained a 0.6 ratings share among adults aged 18–49. The episode received extremely positive reviews from critics, who praised the RV fight scene, writing, performances, directing and emotional tone.

== Plot ==
Authorities have deemed Ava (Joelle Carter) "fugitive number one" and a search for her starts. At the office, Art (Nick Searcy) comes back from leave to take over Marshal operations in Kentucky, surprising Rachel (Erica Tazel). Raylan (Timothy Olyphant) visits a wounded Boyd (Walton Goggins) at a hospital for questioning. Boyd indicates that Ava may be with Zachariah (Jeff Fahey).

Ava and Zachariah have made it to a rescue station in the mountains with the money, intending to escape in the coming days. At their room, Katherine (Mary Steenburgen) talks with Avery (Sam Elliott), telling him that Duffy (Jere Burns) was the snitch against Grady, which doesn't seem to surprise Avery. Despite their lack of trust, Avery still intends to marry and reclaim his money, planning to kill Boyd while Katherine will also try to kill Duffy. While getting her car, Loretta (Kaitlyn Dever) is intimidated once again by Boon (Jonathan Tucker).

Earl (Ryan Dorsey) and Carl (Justin Welborn) are visited in jail by Avery and Boon. Avery tells them about Boyd's plan, which involved having them arrested while he kidnapped Katherine. Carl refuses to believe Boyd would do it, so Avery assigns him a task: he will release him so he can find Boyd and kill him. If Carl fails or attempts to flee, Boon will kill Earl. At the mountain, Raylan, Tim (Jacob Pitts) and the authorities find evidence of Ava and Zachariah in the now empty rescue station and order a helicopter for back-up in finding them. During this, Vasquez (Rick Gomez) expresses concern at Raylan's actions, citing his lack of action against Ava and Boyd and how getting involved with Ava in the past ruined a case and even accuses Raylan of conspiring with Ava in the case.

After talking with Vasquez, Art contacts Raylan to return to Lexington. Raylan reluctantly accepts and drives back to Lexington. During this, Carl knocks out Boyd's guard and confronts him at his hospital room. Boyd convinces him to let him save Earl and get the money. Boyd dons a police's uniform and then immediately kills Carl in the room, warning the hospital staff that there's a shooter, allowing him to escape. Avery is informed of this and orders Boon to release Earl so they can kill him. However, Raylan has deviated from the Lexington road and arrives at the station where Earl is being held. He threatens the cops on Avery's payroll to hand over Earl.

Katherine meets with Mike (Jonathan Kowalsky) on their trailer and she talks with Duffy. Duffy confesses snitching on Grady and killing Simon Poole when he tried to reveal the truth. As Katherine prepares to kill him, Mike interferes, stating that they should let him live and, despite his status, Duffy is still his boss and he will have to avenge him if anyone kills him. This causes a brutal fight between Katherine and Mike, where Katherine shoots him. Despite losing blood and being shot multiple times, Mike manages to kill her by breaking her neck. In his last moments, he passes Duffy the keys so he can release himself. He asks a shocked Duffy to hold him as he collapses and dies.

Raylan visits Avery and Boon at the Pizza Portal. He tells Avery to drop the search for Ava or Earl will testify, which will cause Avery's arrest. When Avery exclaims that he is doing everything for the land he will own with Katherine, Raylan informs him that Katherine died just some minutes ago, devastating him. Earl tells Raylan that Ava and Boyd planned to meet with someone named "Grubes" to help them escape. At the same time, Ava and Zachariah arrive at Grubes' cabin in the hills but are shocked to find him dead. That night, Boyd uses the police cruiser to follow a man in a red truck. Raylan leaves his car and badges with Earl, letting the Marshals arrest him. He calls Art to inform him he will search for Boyd, Ava and the money. Art tells him he has 48 hours and states he won't send anyone to find him, Art himself will pursue Raylan.

== Production ==
=== Development ===
In March 2015, it was reported that the eleventh episode of the sixth season would be titled "Fugitive Number One", and was to be directed by Jon Avnet and written by executive producer Taylor Elmore and Keith Schreier.

=== Writing ===
Series developer Graham Yost credited director Jon Avnet for the RV scene, deeming him the series' "secret weapon" for his "producing instincts and great visual flair". Avnet's original plan for filming the fight involved crashing a window, which would result in Mike and Katherine fighting outside. Due to money and time constraints, the writers told him to keep the fight inside the RV. Yost further said, "he's a very larger than life persona and a lot of fun, and so people got into the spirit of it and they got a lot of work done in that motorhome, which is not an easy place to shoot in." Avnet would later share his "shot list" of the scene, detailing his plans for the fight.

During the making of the episode, the writers considered killing off Nelson Dunlop and even eyed killing Tim Gutterson during the hospital scenes with a more escalated shootout. Charlie Almanza, the series' Marshal adviser, was quoted as saying "then it's really Blackhawk helicopter time. The 8th Army invades if a marshal is killed." This prompted the writers to abandon the idea.

FX executives delivered notes on the episode, particularly the scene where Mike played "Pachelbel's Canon" in the RV to annoy Duffy. Executives deemed the piece "too on the nose", calling it an overdone piece of music. Yost responded by explaining, "Mikey's not the smartest person in the world. He's not going to have the most esoteric taste in classical music. It's not going to be Bartok or Schoenberg or something. He's going to be more the pops." Yost also described it as "the best use of 'Pachelbel’s Canon' since Ordinary People." Star Jere Burns said that he originally pitched an idea to Yost where he would shoot Mike. The original plan was for Duffy to kill Mike to put him out of his misery, deeming it "the most compassionate thing that Wynn does in six years." However, he said "in the end, he's just so mortally wounded that that was unnecessary. It would have been redundant at that point; he was so riddled with bullets. So I knew something like that was coming down the pipe from about episode three or four.

Describing her death scene, Mary Steenburgen said, "My jaw dropped, literally, when I read how it all ended. Jon Avnet is so... he's just such a wonderful director. Everybody, the DP, everybody, we all kind of created that together, the incredible stunt people, Jonathan [Kowalsky], who plays Michael or Mikey, it was just all such a wonderful ballet we all did together. Jere [Burns], of course. Him going under that table! It was wonderful, because I felt like, 'Wow, I've never seen this one before. This is a whole new ball game.'"

== Reception ==
=== Viewers ===
In its original American broadcast, "Fugitive Number One" was seen by an estimated 1.96 million household viewers and gained a 0.6 ratings share among adults aged 18–49, according to Nielsen Media Research. This means that 0.6 percent of all households with televisions watched the episode. This was a 13% increase in viewership from the previous episode, which was watched by 1.72 million viewers with a 0.5 in the 18-49 demographics.

=== Critical reviews ===
"Fugitive Number One" received extremely positive reviews from critics. Seth Amitin of IGN gave the episode a "great" 8.7 out of 10 and wrote in his verdict, "Justified's final season is turning into a solid ending for the series. Episode 11 had a lot crammed into it, maybe too much, but enough for us to understand what was going on. At the same time, we were given some intimate scenes, one particularly touching and tender one, and some loose ends to pick up later. This might just be the ending we were hoping for. Two episodes left."

Alasdair Wilkins of The A.V. Club gave the episode an "A" grade and wrote, "Tonight's Justified continues winnowing the show down to its core elements, and there really isn't room for Avery in that final calculation, which means next week figures to be just as breathtaking as tonight's entry and all the weeks that have preceded it."

Alan Sepinwall of HitFix wrote, "'Fugitive Number One' was another fabulous episode, loaded up with all the things that has made this final season, and Justified as a whole, such a pleasure to watch. Plenty of scenes this week would be the easy standout of another episode, or season, or even series – the hour was like a gourmet meal where the delicious courses kept coming somehow without filling up anyone's appetite." Jeff Stone of IndieWire gave the episode an "A" grade and wrote, "Well, you can't say that the last two episodes of Justified haven't been exciting! The previous nine episodes took their time setting up a dozen combustible elements, and the last two episodes have taken a lot of pleasure in just watching them pinball off one another to see what explosions result. Last episode's series of betrayals culminated in Ava's big play, and this episode has several moments of shocking violence. It's damn fine television."

Kyle Fowle of Entertainment Weekly wrote, "Somehow, some way, Justified has managed to up the ante with every passing episode of its final season. Just as it looks like the show has reached its peak and might settle into a more meditative episode, one that recalibrates where each character is before the final blowout of the series finale, an episode like 'Fugitive Number One' airs and lets us know that there's no time for contemplation in the world of Justified." Matt Zoller Seitz of Vulture gave the episode a perfect 5 star rating out of 5 and wrote, "Justified continued its winning streak with 'Fugitive Number One', a wrenching hour that killed off major characters and seemed to set the remaining major players on rails leading to some horrendous final showdown." Neely Tucker of The Washington Post wrote, "Boyd! Carl! Mikey! Katherine! Ava! Wynn. Good gravy, we are cutting the meat off the bones now, cousins. I sloshed bourbon outta my glass at LEAST twice and yelled at the tee-vee so loud it scared the dog."

James Queally of Los Angeles Times wrote, "I'd be remiss if I didn't spend most of this review praising 'Fugitive Number One' for what it was, another arresting stanza in what's proving to be a masterful sendoff for Justified." Sean McKenna of TV Fanatic gave the episode a 4.6 star rating out of 5 and wrote, "It now really seems less and less likely that Justified Season 6 will find a happy ending, and I'm nervous and excited to see who will be left when the final dust settles." Jack McKinney of Paste gave the episode an 8.9 out of 10 and wrote, "This week, a strong episode otherwise was marred by some suspect plotting choices. I enjoyed the episode greatly overall, but when all was said and done the lasting image in my mind was the one visual you never want a viewer to have: a roomful of writers who know where they want to go, but who can't quite figure out how to get there."
