= The Promise (Justified) =

- Justified episode
- Episode no.: Season 6 Episode 13
- Directed by: Adam Arkin
- Written by: Graham Yost; Fred Golan; Dave Andron; Benjamin Cavell
- Cinematography by: Stefan von Bjorn
- Editing by: Steve Polivka
- Original air date: April 14, 2015
- Running time: 48 minutes

Guest appearances
- Sam Elliott as Avery Markham; Kaitlyn Dever as Loretta McCready; David Koechner as Deputy Greg Sutter; Jonathan Tucker as Boon; Jack Conley as Bartender; Jason Gedrick as Richard; Jeffrey Pierce as Lappicola; Robert Dolan as Detective Costanza; Chad Todhunter as Deputy Stiles; Natalie Zea as Winona Hawkins

Episode chronology
| ← Previous "Collateral" | Next → "City Primeval" |
- Justified (season 6)

"The Promise" is the series finale of the American Neo-Western television series Justified. It is the 13th episode of the sixth season and is the 78th overall episode of the series. The episode was written by series developer Graham Yost and executive producers Fred Golan, Dave Andron and Benjamin Cavell and directed by Adam Arkin. It originally aired on FX on April 14, 2015.

The series is based on Elmore Leonard's stories about the character Raylan Givens, particularly "Fire in the Hole", which serves as the basis for the episode. The series follows Raylan Givens, a tough deputy U.S. Marshal enforcing his own brand of justice. The series revolves around the inhabitants and culture in the Appalachian Mountains area of eastern Kentucky, specifically Harlan County where many of the main characters grew up. The primary conflict of the series revolved around the rivalry of Raylan with childhood friend and criminal Boyd Crowder, who crossed paths with him throughout the course of the series.

The final season covers the last showdown between Raylan and Boyd. Raylan used Boyd's fiancée Ava to work as an informant against him in order to avoid prison time. The season also introduced main antagonist Avery Markham, a big-time criminal recently back from Colorado with a small fortune from legalized cannabis, intending to take over Harlan for his business. In the final episode, the characters will make their last stand in order to survive and set out who leaves Harlan alive.

According to Nielsen Media Research, the episode was seen by an estimated 2.24 million household viewers and gained a 0.7 ratings share among adults aged 18–49, making it the most watched episode of the season. The finale received universal acclaim from critics and audiences, who praised the directing, writing, performances, tension, pace, cinematography and closure, with many declaring it brought the series "full circle". The last scene particularly drew acclaim, and was deemed the highlight of the finale. It is considered by many to be one of the best series finales in TV history.

== Plot ==
Raylan (Timothy Olyphant) is taken into custody by the state troopers at the hospital. At the cabin, Boyd (Walton Goggins) is still looking for the money, finds a shovel that was used recently and digs up around the cabin. At the barn, Ava (Joelle Carter) is brought before Avery (Sam Elliott), who is unhappy to see she only carried $1 million in the bag and demands to know the location of the rest of the money.

As authorities search for Ava, Tim (Jacob Pitts) and Rachel (Erica Tazel) are notified that they found a gator-tooth necklace in the ground (not knowing it belonged to Dewey Crowe). Police scanners pass this information to all officers, including the one that is taking Raylan for custody. Raylan convinces the officer to ask if the necklace was gator-tooth. As the officer takes Raylan to a station, Art (Nick Searcy) appears and demands to take Raylan himself and the officer reluctantly agrees. Boyd fails to find the money, only finding Grubes' corpse. He is then called by Ava, who refers to him as Zachariah and asks for help. Boyd is not willing to help her until she says she is the only one who knows where the money is and agrees to meet with someone at a location. Avery sends Boon (Jonathan Tucker), instructing him to kill him once he gets the money. Boon agrees and takes Loretta (Kaitlyn Dever) with him.

As Art is driving him back to Lexington, Raylan states the situation with Ava and says he must do something. Art then stops the vehicle and hands over Raylan's badge and gun back to him, agreeing to help him. They arrive at a bar to confront Deputy Stiles (Chad Todhunter) for his role as being part of Avery's payroll and they obtain Avery's location at the barn. The Marshals arrive at the cabin but find no sign of Boyd. But they spot him nearby and it starts a pursuit, where Boyd uses dynamite to distract them and manages to evade capture. Art is called to the pursuit and leave his car keys to Raylan, who will go to the barn by himself.

Avery gets mad when he finds that Zachariah didn't show up at the location when suddenly, Boyd arrives holding his officer at gunpoint. An angered Avery then starts shooting but Boyd manages to kill his officers and shoots Avery in the eye, killing him. Boyd then confronts Ava and he pulls the trigger, but his gun is empty. Raylan arrives and has a confrontation with Boyd, intending to end their rivalry once and for all. He goes as far as to willingly hand over a reloaded gun to Boyd, preparing for a shootout. Before it starts, Boyd asks Ava why she did all her actions, she just says she did what he would do. Boyd then refuses to shoot Raylan and intends to provoke in shooting him by saying he will be released from jail and after he kills Ava, he will kill Raylan too. Raylan debates what to do before settling on handing Boyd over to the authorities.

Boyd is taken by Rachel while Raylan escorts Ava in his car. Ava still tries to save herself as she won't survive in prison but Raylan says there won't be a deal for her. Ava then questions what did Raylan try to prove by letting Boyd live, to which he just replies "nothing". Their car is then rammed by Boon's truck, who steps out for a final confrontation with Raylan through a quick draw gunfight. Both pull out their guns at the same time and shoot each other; Raylan is hit a minor wound in the head that impacts his hat while Boon is mortally hit in the chest. Boon tries to use his dying breath to shoot Raylan but Loretta steps on his gun and Boon dies in front of her. As Raylan regains consciousness, Ava has taken over his car and flees.

Raylan appears at the office just before he goes to Florida. He and Art drink from Art's special bottle and while Raylan is worried that Ava is still on the run, Art assures him they'll find her and that he was hired to catch Boyd Crowder, which he accomplished. He then talks and says farewell to Tim, handing him his copy of The Friends of Eddie Coyle. He also passes Rachel and both say goodbye as Raylan leaves the office, wearing Boon's hat as a replacement.

4 years later, Raylan lives in Miami, working for the local Marshal's office and often spends time with his daughter Willa while Winona (Natalie Zea) is now married to a man named Richard (Jason Gedrick). At his office, his partner, Deputy Sutter (David Koechner) tells him he will have to transport from the Glades. Raylan also finds an article sent by Rachel, which shows Ava in a pumpkin patch. Raylan visits her at Lebec, California, she explains that she is living in the caretaker home of an old couple. Raylan deduces that with Ellen May (Abby Miller) and Limehouse (Mykelti Williamson) unavailable, Duffy (Jere Burns) helped her get out of Harlan in exchange for Avery's $9 million, after which he disappeared. She then shows Raylan that she had a child with Boyd, named after Zachariah, and asks Raylan not to tell Boyd about it. Raylan decides not to arrest her and let her stay with her son.

At Tramble penitentiary, Boyd is now a preacher for the inmates, claiming to have found religion again after succumbing to temptation. He is then visited by Raylan, who informs him they found Ava. But he shows him a death certificate for an alias of Ava, telling him she died in a car crash on Texas 3 years ago. A saddened Boyd asks why Raylan went out of his way to deliver the news in person, Raylan states that despite everything, there's something that brought them together in the first place. Boyd then says, "We dug coal together", to which Raylan responds, "That's right." The series ends with title cards thanking everyone involved in the show and a final dedication to author Elmore Leonard.

== Production ==
=== Development ===
In January 2014, FX Original Programming President, Nick Grad mentioned that the series would probably end with the sixth season, "We like having shows that rate really well, and there’s an instinct that you want it to go on forever. But it doesn't. Another metric that's important to us beyond ratings is, 'What shows are going to be talked about in the next 20 years?' If you're making a great, 80-hour movie, it has to have a beginning, middle and end. Going out at the right time is going to make your show last forever — we want to make shows that stand the test of time." One week later, it was announced that the series was renewed for a sixth season, also announcing that it would be the final season. Chairman of FX, John Landgraf, commented, "we talked about it a year ago. They felt that the arc of the show and what they had to say would be best served by six seasons instead of seven. Regretfully, I accepted their decision." Series developer Graham Yost said, "it really felt in terms of the story of Raylan Givens in Kentucky that six years felt about right." He further added, "we just felt like if this chapter in Raylan's life was about Raylan and Boyd that we could only take it so far, that was basically it. We didn't want to outstay our welcome." Back on 2013, Yost said that if they ran for more than six seasons, they run a greater risk of doing "Elmore light." Star Timothy Olyphant said, "usually when things end, I'm not the first person to find out. It's been wonderful to just be able to see the finish line and enjoy it", referring to the cancellation of his previous series Deadwood.

In March 2015, it was reported that the thirteenth episode of the sixth season and series finale would be titled "The Promise", and was to be directed by Adam Arkin and written by series developer Graham Yost and executive producers Fred Golan, Dave Andron and Benjamin Cavell. Many considered that the title referred to the promise made in the first episode, where Raylan says "you make me pull, I'll put you down" to Boyd while talking on the church. But Yost said the title referred to the promise Raylan made to Ava on "Restitution", where he promises to keep her safe. It was also a callback to the first episode, where Ava states she knew everything was going to be fine because she knew it was Raylan.

=== Writing ===
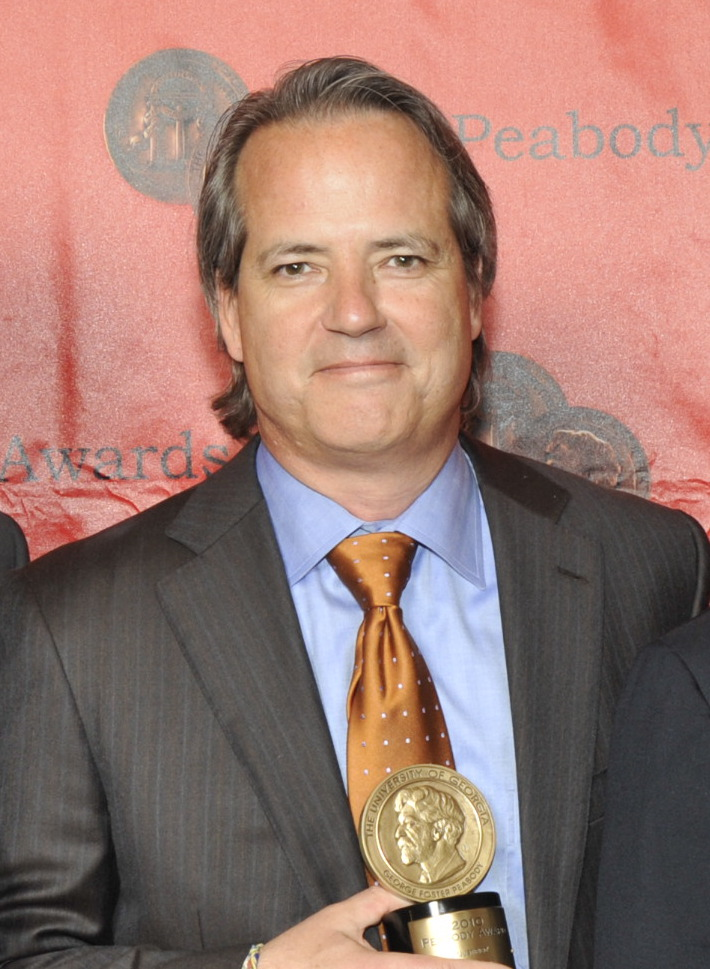
Series developer Graham Yost described the finele, "we think that we ended it in the vicinity of what Elmore would do."

Joelle Carter previewed the finale, saying "this season was filled with schedule conflicts and lots of collaboration. It's always been a show of collaboration, but the writers really honored that we had breathed life into these characters." On the legacy of the series, she said, "I hope it will leave the idea that you can have dramatic entertainment that also has an underlying sense of comedy. We touch on some heavy stuff, but you can also find yourself laughing throughout the hour, and you can escape."

Killing off Raylan was never a plan by the writers. Yost said, "we didn't feel like we were a kind of show that would kill of Raylan. We're not a tragedy. In Elmore's stuff, tragedies happen, but usually the good guy survives." The central idea of the episode was growth, with Yost explaining, "Tim [Olyphant] and I talked right from the beginning of the series that Raylan could grow, but not by much. That was, I suppose, the target for the end."

The confrontation between Raylan and Boyd in the barn was described as "a very, very small needle to thread", according to Walton Goggins. Yost stated that if Raylan killed Boyd, it would be deemed as a sign that Raylan didn't grow over the course of the series. Yost also explained that the scene would draw bring up the question raised in first episode, "what would he have done with Tommy Bucks if Tommy Bucks hadn't drawn?" The writers debated on whether they would kill of Boyd in the episode. They received an e-mail from Greg Sutter, Elmore Leonard's researcher, asking about their intentions in the finale. Sutter said, "Well, you can't kill Boyd. Elmore already tried that in the pilot, in [Leonard's short story that served as the basis for Justified], 'Fire In The Hole', and it didn't stick. You can't do it again." On Boyd's refusal to pull out his gun on Raylan, Yost said, "I think Boyd's point of view is somewhat suicidal, at that point. All is lost: He didn't get Ava. He doesn't get the money. Life as he knows it is about to end. He doesn't get to go out in a blaze of glory." He also cited Unforgiven as an inspiration for the scene, with the writers not putting the showdown at the end of the episode. He said, "it's better to do something that's, again, unexpected and yet something that feels right in terms of the characters." Yost eventually decided it was the right ending, as he felt the series would be over if Raylan killed Boyd, deeming it "a bummer" and said, "it felt like when you get down to our core group that would be sort of wanton slaughter other than something that would feel organic to the show."

Yost said the writers had a clear idea on what to do with Boon, played by Jonathan Tucker. He said, "we knew we wanted to create a character who really modeled himself after Raylan to one degree or another, and he would get a hat, and Raylan would end up with the bad guy's hat." As the writers never intended to have Raylan kill Boyd, the writers still worked on having a situation where Raylan could lose his life, which led to the creation of the character of Boon and their gunfight in the episode. Yost said, "we wanted someone who was a young gun, like Raylan of 20 years ago, and have him go up against himself of the past." Raylan picking up Boon's hat was a small tribute to Leonard. Leonard wanted Raylan to always wear a hat in the series, even though the producers disagreed with his idea. When questioned about the decision about Boon's hat, Sutter told the writers that Leonard "would have gotten a kick out of that."

On David Vasquez's absence in the episode despite his role in the previous episodes, Yost explained that while his search for Ava would continue, it wouldn't be pivotal for the authorities. This was due to Charlie Almanza, the series' technical Marshal adviser, who said, "yeah, they'd always be on the lookout for her, but they got Boyd. And the money was not theirs to begin with, it was a dead man's – so they wouldn't have Ava on a high priority."

The final scene was intended to bring the series "full circle", according to Yost. Yost said, "It was very emotional. It was on our final day on our stages, and it was very emotional. It's strange to get to this point, though we knew it was inevitable. Years ago, we could always say, 'Oh, we have another three seasons, two seasons, one season'. Well, now we're down to one episode, and then one day. And it's a bit breathtaking when it comes. It was one of the best scenes we've had between those characters and those actors, and we're very proud of that." The writers intended for Raylan to be genuine about his feelings during the scene. The line "We dug coal together" was taken from the first episode and Leonard's Fire in the Hole, which inspired the series, and it was delivered by Raylan after shooting Boyd. Actor Walton Goggins suggested that they use the line in the episode and the writers accommodated it. Other callbacks included Winona's statement from the first episode where she called Raylan "the angriest man I've ever known" and Raylan's line "I tried it on and it fit" from "Riverbrook".

The 4-year time jump was originally planned as 5 but the writers felt that was too big of a jump. Yost thought about integrating a jump at least since 2014, saying "pretty early on. Even last year, I would say, I was thinking about a time jump. I liked the idea of Ava being whipsawed between these two guys, them using her for own purposes, and then her choosing her own path, and the idea that she would finally get away one more time. The idea that she would be allowed to stay out in the world felt satisfying." The decision to have Raylan and Winona still separated at the end was reminiscent of Leonard's novels, where the characters would constantly commit the same mistakes. Yost added, "they're always going to love each other, they just can't live together."

Yost considered partially adapting Leonard's unpublished final novel, Blue Dreams. It would've involved Raylan going to Imperial County, California for an assignment. He said, "we kicked around ending with Raylan facing down the bad guys with a shootout in the California desert."

Goggins said his feelings for the finale were "much harder than [I] anticipated", citing his commitment to the series, The Hateful Eight and his previous series finale in The Shield, "Family Meeting". He commented on the final conversation he has with Ava, explaining "there is no greater recipe for sobriety than the only person you trust and love in the world telling you that." Commenting on ending the series, Yost said, "It's strange. It's really bittersweet. We're happy with how we decided to end it. We hope the audience responds. We showed it to people in Harlan this weekend, and they got a kick out of it. It's fun to see it with a group of people. Everything's gotta end at some point. We think that we ended it in the vicinity of what Elmore would do. People have asked me over the years how it ends, and I would say, 'Read Elmore Leonard'. And this is pretty much, I think, how he would have chosen to do it."

=== Casting ===
Abby Miller and Mykelti Williamson appear in the episode uncredited as their respective characters. Their appearances were nearly scrapped as both actors had scheduling conflicts. The writers intended to have Damon Herriman and Margo Martindale to return as Dewey Crowe and Mags Bennett at some point during the finale but scheduling conflicts prevented it from happening.

Jason Gedrick, who worked with Yost on Boomtown, makes an appearance as Richard, Winona's new husband. The series also starred Neal McDonough, Mykelti Williamson and Gary Basaraba, all three ended up making appearances in Justified. Yost hoped that Boomtown' series regulars Donnie Wahlberg, Lana Parrilla and Nina Garbiras could appear at some point.

Yost noted the difficulty of managing to get all actors in the series involved at the same time. Scheduling conflicts included Kaitlyn Dever working on Last Man Standing, Walton Goggins working on The Hateful Eight and Jere Burns working on Angie Tribeca. It was a priority for Yost to get Dever on the final episodes, saying "every scene she's in just has an extra punch to it because she's in it. And it's also a sense of the future. That she is the one Harlan person who's sticking around, and she's going to try to make things work. She's not leaving. Everyone else is talking about leaving, and she's not. We thought that was important, too."

=== Filming ===
The final scene, where Raylan visits Boyd in prison, was intended as the last scene to be filmed for the series. Goggins said he "almost couldn't get through it." His final scene was Boyd preaching at the prison, stating "I got to go out on Boyd Crowder and preach it", further adding "it was a great high to end on." The idea was suggested by Goggins to the producer, who liked the idea.

== Reception ==
=== Viewers ===
In its original American broadcast, "The Promise" was seen by an estimated 2.24 million household viewers and gained a 0.7 ratings share among adults aged 18–49, according to Nielsen Media Research. This means that 0.7 percent of all households with televisions watched the episode. This was a 22% increase in viewership from the previous episode, which was watched by 1.83 million viewers with a 0.5 in the 18-49 demographics. But it was a 6% decrease in viewership from the previous season finale, which was watched by 2.37 million viewers with a 0.8 in the 18-49 demographics.

=== Critical reviews ===
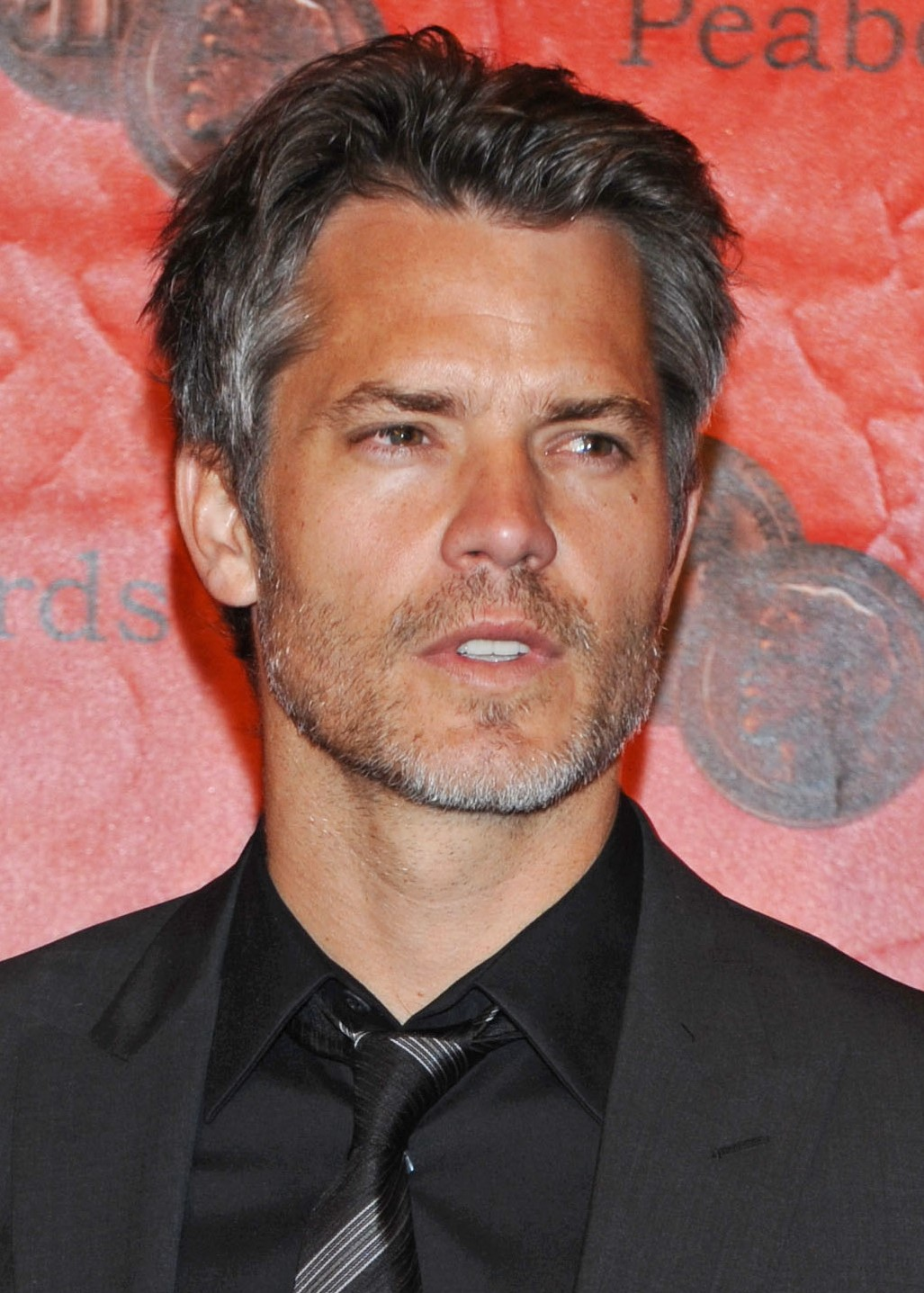
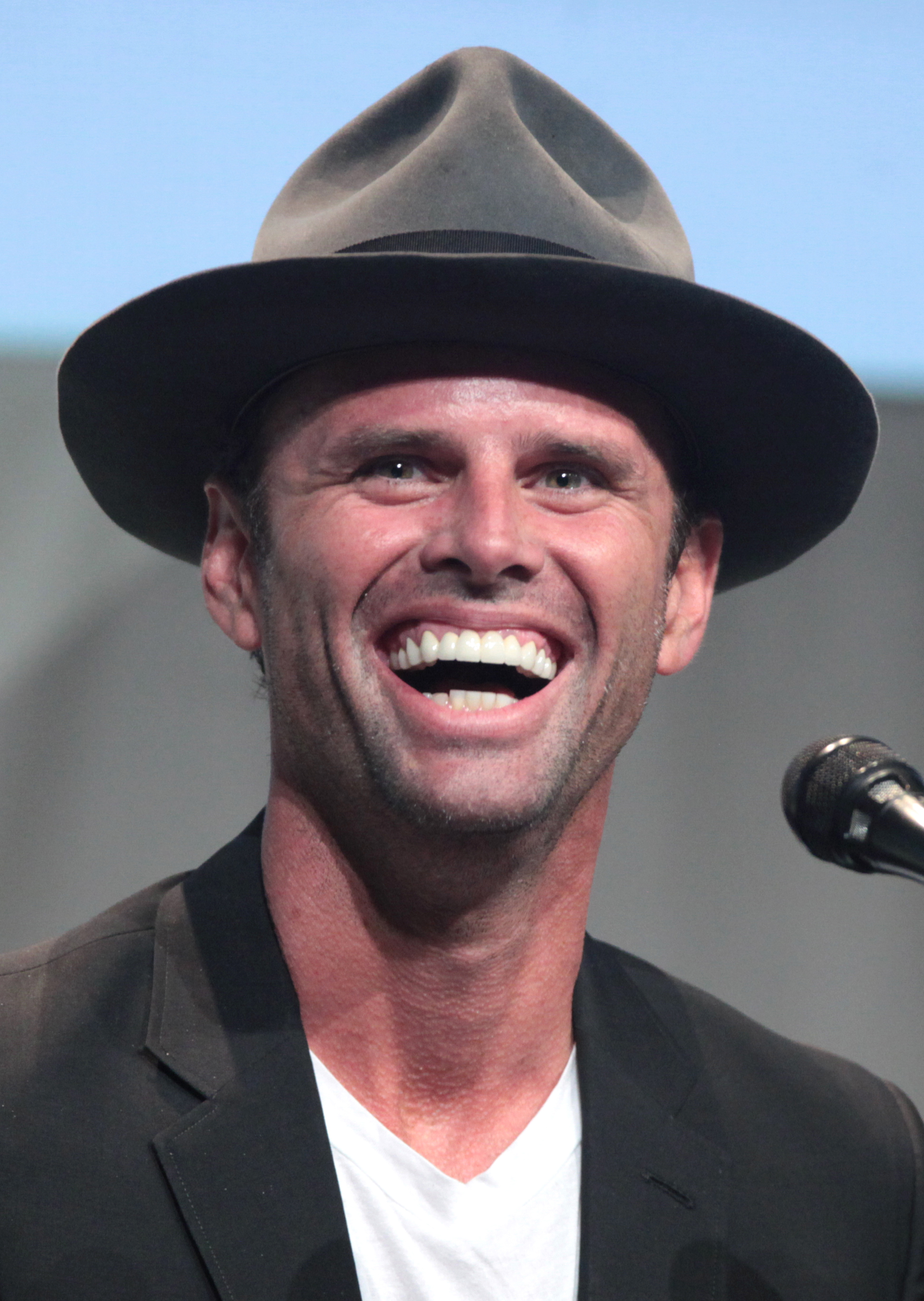
Timothy Olyphant (left) and Walton Goggins (right)'s performances received universal acclaim from critics, with many deeming their final scene as the highlight of the finale.

"The Promise" received universal acclaim from critics. Seth Amitin of IGN gave the episode a perfect "masterpiece" 10 out of 10 and wrote in his verdict, "At the end, the series ended exactly as it should have: charming, bordering sweet and bittersweet, and leaving us with a mostly resolved world. Ava is free. Boyd is in prison. Raylan has moved on with his life. Like a good book, we put down the remote and felt satisfied. Elmore Leonard would be proud."

Alasdair Wilkins of The A.V. Club gave the episode an "A" grade and wrote, "Boyd and Raylan definitely aren't friends, and it would be a mistake to think they somehow are underneath all the sniping and subterfuge. Yet, in that final scene and perhaps all along, they are far more friends than they ever were enemies. In the end, neither is really a good description of what they are to each other. They dug coal together. That's right." James Poniewozik of Time wrote, "It's only a kind of Western, and what has made it great–its true legacy from late godfather Elmore Leonard–is that its choicest ammunition has always been the word. And Justified spends its final 20 minutes displaying its verbal firepower." Kevin Fitzpatrick of ScreenCrush wrote, "So ends Justified. Long live Justified. A surprisingly low body count, but a pitch-perfect ending to one of TV's best, often-overlooked dramas. Raylan survived and made it to Miami, despite eventually losing Winona, while Ava managed to flee as far as California, giving birth to a baby boy that Boyd Crowder would never learn about, for the rest of his days preaching behind bars. Art, Rachel and Tim all got sentimental send-offs, and even Wynn Duffy lived to retire to a surfing sunset in Maui."

Alan Sepinwall of HitFix wrote, "Some finales can elevate how you feel about the entire series that led up to it. Some can completely sour the memory of all that came before. 'The Promise' was neither of those things. It was a definitive, entertaining conclusion to the story of Raylan's time in Kentucky, and I suppose that will make the show both easier to recommend to newcomers and more enticing to revisit one day for us. It felt very much of a piece of all that came before it. I will miss these characters and this world, all the sharp things people said and all the exciting things they did. All stories end, though, and this was a very good end to an often great story." Jeff Stone of IndieWire gave the episode an "A" grade and wrote, "What's most surprising about 'The Promise', the final episode of a stellar six-season run of Justified, is how quiet it is. There's action in this episode, sure, but the final third is dedicated to following the three main characters four years into the future, for scenes of reflection. It's a ballsy move for a show that had so much action over the years, but it's not the wrong call. The finale offered a sense of true resolution for everything that mattered, with a great series of scenes culminating in a truly moving final moment. If you loved this series as I did, this was a wonderful finale." Mike Hale of The New York Times wrote, "Tuesday's episode suffered a common series-finale affliction: In order to leave room for a poignant coda, the showdowns between Raylan and Boyd and Raylan and Boon were a little rushed and anticlimactic. But the final 15 minutes were worth it — a quiet, bittersweet postscript, with no far-fetched twist or excess sentiment."

Jeff Jensen of Entertainment Weekly wrote, "Justified departs as that rare series that succeeds as saga, as a cohesive, thematically clear whole. Going into the finale, I worried that Justified had left way too many story lines for the show to wrap up in satisfying fashion. And yet, Yost, his fellow writers, director Adam Arkin and the cast managed to do everything they needed to do and then some, making every scene and every beat count for something, every moment of important getting exactly the amount of time it needed, no more, no less. There were curious compressions, but the quality of everything else made the clunk easy to ignore." Matt Zoller Seitz of Vulture gave the episode a perfect 5 star rating out of 5 and wrote, "What we did see was spare, concrete, and direct — basically an extended climax, a muffled detonation of a fuse that had been burning all season long. The end might be the best cut to black since the end of The Sopranos, though of course the artistic intent could not be more different. We saw what happened, we know what it meant, now it's all over." Emily St. James of Vox wrote, "The most remarkable thing about the series finale of FX's Justified, which first aired Tuesday, April 14, is how it functions as both a capper for a six-season story and an almost perfect mirror of the show's very first episode."

Tim Goodman of The Hollywood Reporter wrote, "That finale should be considered a high point of the series (along with the masterful second season), because all endings on television are difficult and more so when you've got a protagonist/antagonist situation where both characters are, in some way, equally beloved by the audience. In the end, Justified won't sit in the pantheon of shows like The Wire, The Sopranos, Mad Men or Breaking Bad, but somewhere high on the tier below. However, Raylan and Boyd will certainly take their place with the best of any of the characters from those other shows. And that's a mighty accomplishment." Brian Lowry of Variety wrote, "The finale stayed true to the program's modern-cowboy ethos as well as the heady mixture of drama, comedy and tension that has always defined the dynamics among its key players." Maureen Ryan of The Huffington Post wrote, "Episodes of the show regularly had what felt like abrupt endings, but maybe that's because the show was really at its best when it was simply hanging out with its characters. There was an expansive, relaxed quality to Justified, a show that liked to simply spend time with its characters and listen to them talk. What pleasure we got from those hours spent with these men and women for six seasons."

James Queally of Los Angeles Times wrote, "'The Promise' is something of a muted finale for a show like Justified, but it's the right finish, not quite excellent but certainly memorable. It hummed along, leaving me not entirely certain when it was going to end." Sean McKenna of TV Fanatic gave the episode a 4.7 star rating out of 5 and wrote, "Justified, the sort of modern-day Western, may not have gone out guns blazing, but it succeeded in finding a satisfying ending that stuck true to its characters and story. So long, Raylan Givens, it was a blast of a ride." Jack McKinney of Paste gave the episode a perfect 10 out of 10 and wrote, "With its deep interest in families, Justified is a generational show for the generations. When viewers rewatch episodes years from now, I suspect that they will be shocked and delighted when they discover the myriad ways that the show built upon, doubled back on, reinvented, reflected, and re-imagined itself, all while staying true to a common tone and through-line."
