= The Hunt (Justified) =

- Justified episode
- Episode no.: Season 6 Episode 7
- Directed by: John Dahl
- Written by: Taylor Elmore & Keith Schreier
- Cinematography by: Stefan von Bjorn
- Editing by: Steve Polivka
- Original air date: March 3, 2015
- Running time: 48 minutes

Guest appearances
- Sam Elliott as Avery Markham; Garret Dillahunt as Ty Walker; Justin Welborn as Carl; Jeff Fahey as Zachariah Randolph; Scott Grimes as Seabass; Natalie Zea as Winona Hawkins

Episode chronology
← Previous "Alive Day"	Next → "Dark As a Dungeon"
- Justified (season 6)

"The Hunt" is the seventh episode of the sixth season of the American Neo-Western television series Justified. It is the 72nd overall episode of the series and was written by executive producer Taylor Elmore and Keith Schreier and directed by Peter Werner. It originally aired on FX on March 3, 2015.

The series is based on Elmore Leonard's stories about the character Raylan Givens, particularly "Fire in the Hole", which serves as the basis for the episode. The series follows Raylan Givens, a tough deputy U.S. Marshal enforcing his own brand of justice. The series revolves around the inhabitants and culture in the Appalachian Mountains area of eastern Kentucky, specifically Harlan County where many of the main characters grew up. In the episode, Raylan meets with Winona and their daughter and questions what kind of relationship he will try in the future for them. Meanwhile, Boyd takes Ava out to his dad's cabin in the mountains for some "questions" while Walker struggles to escape a manhunt on his name.

According to Nielsen Media Research, the episode was seen by an estimated 1.73 million household viewers and gained a 0.5 ratings share among adults aged 18–49. The episode received generally positive reviews from critics, who praised the scenes involving Boyd and Ava while Raylan's and Walker's separate storylines received a more mixed response.

== Plot ==
While authorities search for Walker (Garret Dillahunt), Raylan (Timothy Olyphant) asks Rachel (Erica Tazel) for time off to work on something. She accepts his request but warns him not to pursue Walker all by himself. Meanwhile, Walker talks to Avery (Sam Elliott) for helping him in an extraction. Seabass (Scott Grimes) sets out to go help him but Avery pays him with a stack of cash to burn Walker for his actions, buying his loyalty.

With the information that Limehouse provided him, Boyd (Walton Goggins) tells Ava (Joelle Carter) that he wants them to go to his family cabin in the mountains at that exact moment. At the cabin, they drink from a bottle originally intended for their wedding and talk about loyalty and trust. Ava loses her grip and shares her frustrations with Boyd taking her out. When Boyd allows her to hit him, she hits him twice in the face, causing him to nearly strangle her. After that, they start making love. Meanwhile, Raylan is actually visiting Winona (Natalie Zea) and their daughter Willa at his hotel room. Raylan holds his daughter for the first time but is told by Winona that Willa has a grade 4 heart murmur, and they need to work on the custody arrangements. They later have a fight over Raylan's failure to commitment.

At a station's washroom, Walker uses a knife to dig out the bullet that was shot in his shoulder. He then pays a pair of frat boys on their way to Orlando to deliver his vest to 1212 Main Street for him, and apparently sends out his credit cards as other decoys. The next morning, Art (Nick Searcy) finds Avery waiting at the conference room on the Marshal's office. He brings up the many coincidences and past crimes associated with Avery. One of these includes Grady's indictment and his affair with Katherine and U.S. Attorney Simon Poole who was shot dead about the same time (Poole would have been the only one who knew the identity of the snitch against Grady). Avery deflects every accusation. Art leaves and greets Raylan, who arrived with Willa at the office. Tim (Jacob Pitts) tells Raylan about Walker's credit card, which has been registering recent activities. Raylan immediately deduces that Walker threw his cards off to avoid detection.

Walker's car breaks down in the middle of nowhere and he calls an ambulance for help. However, he recognizes that the paramedics know about his manhunt and try to sedate him, to which he kills both of them and runs with their medical supplies. Raylan once again meets with Winona, who says she wants to go back to the way they were: together and raising their daughter, willing to go as far as to let Raylan be himself whenever they go.

Boyd takes Ava out before dawn to hunt, talking about killing and betrayal, then leaves her unarmed as he kills a boar. After they eat, Ava confronts him as to why he took her there. He then coldly states he knows she went with Limehouse and that someone helped her out with Errol in the hardware store, deducing it was Raylan as he was visiting their house later that night. Ava then confesses her role as an informant for Raylan, intending to deliver Boyd to him. Boyd is bewildered and takes out his gun. Ava then states he left her no choice, having abandoned her in prison, she reveals her knowledge of the planned deal he had with Raylan for a "clean slate" for himself.

Boyd fears she sleeps with Raylan and asks her to kill him with his gun but she denies the claim. Boyd apologizes, saying he'd let her down when she was in prison, and that if they trust each other they can have Raylan going in circles while Boyd gets enough money for them to start over again. He then goes to pick up more logs when it is revealed he handed her an empty gun and secretly reloads it. Raylan then says goodbye to Winona and Willa as they prepare to return to Florida. When Winona questions him on his decision, he says they should go for it and promises to see them soon.

== Production ==
=== Development ===
In February 2015, it was reported that the seventh episode of the sixth season would be titled "The Hunt", and was to be directed by John Dahl and written by executive producer Taylor Elmore and Keith Schreier.

=== Writing ===
On bringing Winona back on the series, series developer Graham Yost said, "we just felt it was the time for us to do something big about both relationships — Boyd and Ava and Raylan and Winona. We feel it's kind of an episode unlike any other episode we've ever done in that it's so focused on those two stories." He further added, "the whole point of the Raylan and Winona thing was to remind Raylan what's at stake. He gets so involved in the job — in the Boyd of it, in the Markham of it — that he forgets his priorities, and I think you'll see [in the next episode] his priority is rekindled."

=== Casting ===
Despite being credited, Jere Burns does not appear in the episode as his respective character.

== Reception ==
=== Viewers ===
In its original American broadcast, "The Hunt" was seen by an estimated 1.73 million household viewers and gained a 0.5 ratings share among adults aged 18–49, according to Nielsen Media Research. This means that 0.5 percent of all households with televisions watched the episode. This was a 5% decrease in viewership from the previous episode, which was watched by 1.81 million viewers with a 0.5 in the 18-49 demographics.

=== Critical reviews ===
"The Hunt" received generally positive reviews from critics. Seth Amitin of IGN gave the episode a "good" 7.3 out of 10 and wrote in his verdict, "Putting aside the decent acting and dialogue in this one, there's still an aimless feel about this final season of Justified and this episode isn't helping. Ava turning I guess will be necessary to whatever end is coming, but we're still waiting for some kind of action to blend in with the words. With only six episodes left, there's only one thing left to wonder: when does it start?"

Alasdair Wilkins of The A.V. Club gave the episode an "A" grade and wrote, "'The Hunt' is a masterclass for these elliptical conversations, but what elevates this episode to the top tier of Justified entries is that it also has moments of utter, terrifying honesty." Kevin Fitzpatrick of Screen Crush wrote, "'The Hunt' offered a few other scenes to enjoy, like Art getting a chance to size up Avery Markham at the police station, or Rachel coming into her own as Interim Chief, but it seemed for the most part like tonight was treading water until Boyd and Ava could put cards on the table. We don't yet know Ty Walker's ultimate fate, and the mining subplot only warranted a scant appearance, considering we don't yet know its full scope, or how far Zachariah would go for revenge on Boyd."

Alan Sepinwall of HitFix wrote, "'The Hunt' focuses primarily on the once and potentially future love interests of our main hero and villain, and returns to familiar settings for discussion what happened, what's to come, and how much one partner in each relationship has to accept the true nature of the other." Jeff Stone of IndieWire gave the episode a "B" grade and wrote, "To say Ava and Boyd Crowder have a complicated relationship would be understating things quite a bit. She's drawn to him, but he's also the brother of her abusive husband, a man she shot to death at the dinner table. Everyone in Harlan knows the Crowders are bad news, but Boyd is different, at least in the way he treats women. But there's still that doubt. The apple doesn't fall far from the tree, and the Crowder family tree is more rotten than most."

Kyle Fowle of Entertainment Weekly wrote, "What's interesting about this final season of Justified is that Raylan's storyline is the least interesting of the bunch. Television has no shortage of cops who love their jobs more than their families, who have no problem taking control in their work environments but just make a mess of their personal lives. It's a story line that's been played out plenty of times, and in this episode, the beats feel very familiar." Matt Zoller Seitz of Vulture gave the episode a perfect 5 star rating out of 5 and wrote, "'The Hunt' ends with a maybe-reconciliation between Raylan and Winona, and the possibility that Boyd might murder his beloved Ava after deviously getting confirmation that she was ratting him out to the U.S. Marshals. These are both huge developments, but the episode takes its sweet time setting them up. It's a slow-building hour, but so confident and patient that the slowness creates a different kind of tension than we're used to seeing on TV."

James Queally of Los Angeles Times wrote, "One week after the gunfight that led to Choo-Choo's last stand, Justified chose to slow things dramatically with 'The Hunt', an episode loaded with talking, talking... and more talking... that cements the stakes for the series' final chapter. And it worked, sort of." Sean McKenna of TV Fanatic gave the episode a 4.6 star rating out of 5 and wrote, "This episode took more of a break from the action and the hunt, putting the characters back front and center. And Justified has excelled with its characters. It'll definitely be sad to see them all go, but this season is really making a memorable last stand." Jack McKinney of Paste gave the episode a 9.3 out of 10 and wrote, "If anyone out there has been waiting excitedly for the point in the season where several of our characters finally give in to the stress and anxiety that has been building all season and completely lose their shit, then this episode is for you. It was a terrible week to be a bad guy and a strangely serene and charming week to be a good guy."

=== Accolades ===
TVLine named Walton Goggins as an honorable mention as the "Performer of the Week" for the week of March 7, 2015, for his performance in the episode. The site wrote, "Justified viewers dreaded Boyd inevitably learning that Ava's a snitch, primarily because there was no telling how he'd react. And with Walton Goggins' work as that scenario played out, we indeed were on edge of seat."
