= Fate's Right Hand =

Fate's Right Hand may refer to:

- Fate's Right Hand (album), 2003 studio album
- Fate's Right Hand (Justified), TV episode
