= The Toll (Justified) =

- Justified episode
- Episode no.: Season 5 Episode 11
- Directed by: Jon Avnet
- Written by: Benjamin Cavell
- Cinematography by: Francis Kenny
- Editing by: Steve Polivka
- Original air date: March 25, 2014
- Running time: 42 minutes

Guest appearances
- Michael Rapaport as Daryl Crowe Jr.; Rick Gomez as AUSA David Vasquez; Shashawnee Hall as Marshal Ed Kirkland; John Kapelos as Picker; Jacob Lofland as Kendal Crowe; Jesse Luken as Jimmy Tolan; Danielle Panabaker as Penny; Amy Smart as Alison Brander; Alicia Witt as Wendy Crowe; Leslie Riley as Leslie Mullen; Justin Welborn as Carl; Mary Steenburgen as Katherine Hale

Episode chronology
← Previous "Weight"	Next → "Starvation"
- Justified (season 5)

"The Toll" is the eleventh episode of the fifth season of the American Neo-Western television series Justified. It is the 63rd overall episode of the series and was written by co-executive producer Benjamin Cavell and directed by Jon Avnet. It originally aired on FX on March 25, 2014.

The series is based on Elmore Leonard's stories about the character Raylan Givens, particularly "Fire in the Hole", which serves as the basis for the episode. The series follows Raylan Givens, a tough deputy U.S. Marshal enforcing his own brand of justice. The series revolves around the inhabitants and culture in the Appalachian Mountains area of eastern Kentucky, specifically Harlan County where many of the main characters grew up. In the episode, Art is severely wounded after being shot protecting Alison. Raylan and the Marshals then set out to find the shooter while Boyd meets with his associates to arrange a new deal for their business.

According to Nielsen Media Research, the episode was seen by an estimated 2.05 million household viewers and gained a 0.6 ratings share among adults aged 18–49. The episode received positive reviews from critics, who praised the acting, writing and pace.

== Plot ==
Ava (Joelle Carter) cleans herself after killing Judith and Penny (Danielle Panabaker) takes her back to their dorm just as a lockdown begins. Meanwhile, Art (Nick Searcy) takes Alison (Amy Smart) out of her apartment after the authorities fear for her life. As they exit, a hitman arrives and shoots Art in the stomach.

Raylan (Timothy Olyphant) and Art's wife, Leslie (Leslie Riley) meet at the hospital with Tim (Jacob Pitts) and Rachel (Erica Tazel), who state that Art is in critical condition. Raylan suspects Daryl (Michael Rapaport) was involved but Rachel says they can't do anything, as Marshal Kirkland (Shashawnee Hall) will come and temporarily take Art's spot. When Rachel leaves, Tim suggests to Raylan that they work to get to Daryl but Raylan rebuffs his suggestion. Raylan visits the office and finds a sleepy Alison there, who can't reveal much due to her condition. He then meets with Kirkland, who deduces Theo Tonin was behind the hit. AUSA Vasquez (Rick Gomez) shows up, revealing that Tonin confessed to the shooting and will point to the hitman.

Boyd (Walton Goggins) meets with Duffy (Jere Burns), Katherine (Mary Steenburgen) and Picker (John Kapelos) to discuss their now-missed heroin shipment. He blames the loss on the Crowes but they are considering killing him for all recent events. Marshals led by Tim and Rachel then raid the room, having been led there by Tonin's confession. Raylan talks with Picker at his interrogation room, as Tonin pointed him as the shooter. Raylan and Kirkland offer him a better deal if he helps them find Daryl. However, Tim finds evidence that Picker wasn't in the apartment at the time of the shooting. They then find that Wendy (Alicia Witt) called and Daryl will turn himself in, but only to Raylan.

Raylan meets with Wendy on a hotel room but finds no sign of Daryl. Daryl and Kendal (Jacob Lofland) have arrived at the office and Daryl turns himself in while Kendal is taken by the officers. However, Kendal confesses to shooting Art, having confused him for Raylan as he blames him for Danny's death. After they are released, Boyd, Duffy, Katherine and Picker resume their meeting, where Boyd offers Duffy a share of his heroin shipment, angering Picker. Boyd hands Picker a box of cigarettes containing a timer bomb, which kills Picker. He maintains his offer to Duffy and exits the hotel room.

Kirkland leaves his position and tells Rachel that Art named her his successor at the office in case of emergency. Raylan confronts Daryl as he is forced to release him, telling him that Kendal will be sent to juvie for his actions. He deduces Daryl forced Kendal to take the blame after knowing it was Art who was shot and not Raylan, and threatens him to bring him down. The episode ends as Raylan visits Art, who is still in a coma, in the hospital, replacing the Marshal watching over him.

== Production ==
=== Development ===
In February 2014, it was reported that the eleventh episode of the fifth season would be titled "The Toll", and was to be directed by Jon Avnet and written by co-executive producer Benjamin Cavell.

=== Writing ===
The original idea for the episode involved making a bottle episode, as the series already went over-budget throughout the season. While Jon Avnet shot the episode in 6 days instead of the usual 7, writer Benjamin Cavell added a gunfight and an explosion to the script. Series developer Graham Yost said, "we just wanted Boyd to do something dramatic and have this scene with Katherine Hale, and have it just be this, 'Holy s–t!' kind of moment." He further added, "we wanted it to be momentarily grisly. We debated in the cut how much we were gonna show of it. There's a side shot of him actually exploding, which is a dummy with John Kapelos' head grafted digitally onto it, and then there's the aftermath shot head on."

== Reception ==
=== Viewers ===
In its original American broadcast, "The Toll" was seen by an estimated 2.05 million household viewers and gained a 0.6 ratings share among adults aged 18–49, according to Nielsen Media Research. This means that 0.6 percent of all households with televisions watched the episode. This was a slight increase in viewership from the previous episode, which was watched by 2.04 million viewers with a 0.7 in the 18-49 demographics.

=== Critical reviews ===
"The Toll" received positive reviews from critics. Seth Amitin of IGN gave the episode a "great" 8.2 out of 10 and wrote in his verdict, "We've paid quite a bit to get to 'The Toll' and things are starting to pay off. Certainly this isn't the neatest, nuts-and-boltsiest story development for a season we've seen from Justified, but Season 5 now has our attention. Let's hope it segues neatly into a brilliant final season."

Alasdair Wilkins of The A.V. Club gave the episode a "B+" grade and wrote, "For all the greatness of that sudden, shocking moment, 'The Toll' can't quite match the quality of the last couple of episodes. After taking the last couple of weeks to round the season into shape, Justified needs tonight's story to set up the endgame that should play out over the last couple of episodes, and that means this episode features a lot of narrative maneuvering punctuated by two great bursts of decisive, violent action." Kevin Fitzpatrick of Screen Crush wrote, "So while we knew the higher stakes would come, 'The Toll' doesn't necessarily suffer the lacking expense, putting a personal tone over the final three episodes that should carry us well into the finale."

Alan Sepinwall of HitFix wrote, "This has been a disappointing and at times frustrating season of Justified, and last week's episode arguably had more high notes than this one. But 'The Toll' was the kind of episode this show is built to do well with, and it did." James Quealley of The Star-Ledger wrote, "This season of Justified has been so uneven that I spent a few minutes leaning back after watching 'The Toll', wondering if familiarity was breeding my contempt."

Matt Zoller Seitz of Vulture gave the episode a 3 star rating out of 5 and wrote, "Things continue to fall apart on 'The Toll'. The body count rises higher. Old arrangements get reconfigured." Holly Anderson of Grantland wrote, "Where this episode really sings is bringing characters together in long-missed or unfamiliar pairings and watching them work in so many combinations."

Carla Day of TV Fanatic gave the episode a 4.5 star rating out of 5 and wrote, "It quickly shifted when shots were fired and Art's life was on the line. That life or death situation set the morose tone for the rest of the hour." Jack McKinney of Paste gave the episode a 9.8 out of 10 and wrote, "I would never describe the inconsistencies of this season as 'bad' — I'm not sure 'bad' Justified is even possible — but, for me, there are three things that separate very good from sublime where episodes and whole seasons are concerned: focus, balance and stakes. 'The Toll' is a master class in all three."

=== Accolades ===
TVLine named Alicia Witt as an honorable mention as the "Performer of the Week" for the week of March 29, 2013, for her performance in the episode. The site wrote, "Witt displayed a mother's utter devastation — that her boy, so young, would be take such action or, worse, be compelled to engage in a cover-up."
