= Trust (Justified) =

- Justified episode
- Episode no.: Season 6 Episode 10
- Directed by: Adam Arkin
- Written by: Benjamin Cavell
- Cinematography by: Attila Szalay
- Editing by: Steve Polivka
- Original air date: March 24, 2015
- Running time: 40 minutes

Guest appearances
- Mary Steenburgen as Katherine Hale; Justin Welborn as Carl; K. Callan as Lilian; Rick Gomez as AUSA David Vasquez; Jonathan Tucker as Boon; Andrew J. West as Waiter; Ryan Dorsey as Earl; Jonathan Kowalsky as Mike; Mykelti Williamson as Ellstin Limehouse; Sam Elliott as Avery Markham

Episode chronology
← Previous "Burned"	Next → "Fugitive Number One"
- Justified (season 6)

"Trust" is the tenth episode of the sixth season of the American Neo-Western television series Justified. It is the 75th overall episode of the series and was written by executive producer Benjamin Cavell and directed by Adam Arkin. It originally aired on FX on March 24, 2015.

The series is based on Elmore Leonard's stories about the character Raylan Givens, particularly "Fire in the Hole", which serves as the basis for the episode. The series follows Raylan Givens, a tough deputy U.S. Marshal enforcing his own brand of justice. The series revolves around the inhabitants and culture in the Appalachian Mountains area of eastern Kentucky, specifically Harlan County where many of the main characters grew up. In the episode, Boyd kidnaps Katherine in order to blackmail Avery for ransom money. Meanwhile, Ava finds Dewey Crowe's necklace and is desperate to cooperate with the Marshals when Vasquez wants to end their partnership.

According to Nielsen Media Research, the episode was seen by an estimated 1.72 million household viewers and gained a 0.5 ratings share among adults aged 18–49. The episode received extremely positive reviews from critics, who praised the twists, performances, writing, directing and "shocking" ending.

== Plot ==
Katherine (Mary Steenburgen) talks with Duffy (Jere Burns) on the phone, expressing frustration that they committed the heist and fire while she was in the Pizza Portal. Unknown to Katherine, Raylan (Timothy Olyphant) and Tim (Jacob Pitts) are overhearing their discussion.

Limehouse (Mykelti Williamson) meets with Boyd (Walton Goggins) at the bar, where Boyd pays him the $100,000 reward to help him and Ava (Joelle Carter) escape Harlan once the new heist is done. Limehouse accepts to help them but states that once they leave, they can never return to Harlan. During this, Ava finds Dewey Crowe's gator-tooth necklace and takes it. At a diner, Raylan and Tim meet with Avery (Sam Elliott) and Boon (Jonathan Tucker). They push Avery's paranoia, suggesting that Katherine is working with Boyd to steal his money and predicting that she will inquire about how he's moving it. They suggest him to call her and tell that he is moving the money to Charlotte as a trust test, although Avery says he trusts her. However, after they leave, Avery calls her to tell her that he's moving the money to Charlotte.

Katherine informs Duffy about the new move, so he informs Boyd and his crew. Raylan and Tim set up a decoy truck to be attacked in order to get Boyd although they express concern that Boyd will not fall for it. At the bar, Boyd sends Carl (Justin Welborn) and Earl (Ryan Dorsey) to hit the car but he tells Ava that he knows the truck is a decoy. Ava relays this information to Raylan, who informs Rachel (Erica Tazel) and Vasquez (Rick Gomez). Vasquez expresses frustration that Ava hasn't helped them in the case and intends to send her back to prison. Meanwhile, Boyd meets with Katherine holding a gun.

Avery visits Loretta's great aunt Lilian (K Callan) to stop her partnership with Boyd and offers to buy her properties. Lilian refuses and Avery leaves the house, but he instructs Boon to enter and kill Lilian. He then receives a call from Katherine's phone but it's actually Boyd, who has kidnapped Katherine and will only release her if Avery gives him his money on a certain location. Avery does not hesitate in the terms and accepts to do what is needed. Meanwhile, Duffy is confronted by his bodyguard Mike (Jonathan Kowalsky), who has deduced that Duffy snitched on Grady Hale. He attacks Duffy and handcuffs him to a table. He then leaves a message on Katherine's phone, telling her he needs to speak with her, unaware of her current status.

Earl and Carl are arrested after trying to hit on the decoy truck although there are no shots fired and Tim informs that Boyd wasn't with them. Raylan visits Ava at her house, as she prepares to pack their stuff with Limehouse's fake IDs. He explains that Vasquez wants to end her cooperation, which will result in Ava returning to prison. Ava then pulls out Dewey's necklace, suggesting that they could arrest for his murder. Raylan states they can't arrest him without proper evidence and the necklace is not enough to prove it. Ava then suggests she could get Boyd to confess. At the diner, Boon intimidates a hipster and an engineering student in a greasy spoon.

Avery meets with Boyd at night to deliver two duffel bags of money. Boyd returns Katherine and leaves with the money, but he also tells Avery that Katherine was involved in the heist as revenge because she thought he killed Grady. Katherine claims she no longer believes he killed her husband and asks what's gonna happen now, Avery doesn't respond. Boyd meets with Ava on the road and they hug. However, Ava uses the opportunity to take his gun and shoot him in the shoulder. Raylan appears, as Ava was just supposed to make him confess. Ava defends her actions, stating that he wouldn't confess and that Vasquez would probably still send her to prison. Despite Raylan telling her that he will follow her, she gets into Boyd's truck and leaves with the money.

== Production ==
=== Development ===
In February 2015, it was reported that the tenth episode of the sixth season would be titled "Trust", and was to be directed by Adam Arkin and written by executive producer Benjamin Cavell.

=== Writing ===
When questioned about Ava's actions, series developer Graham Yost said, "the big idea was that we wanted to build a season that was about Raylan versus Boyd with Ava caught in the middle. To a degree, it was kind of a little bit like Boyd's old thing of blowing up a car on the edge of town and distracting people while he's actually going to go hit a bank. To a degree, we wanted to distract people with the Raylan versus Boyd and not have them realize that the story was really about Ava, and that she was going to do something that was going to confound them both. The story would then be about getting Ava and who's going to get her first."

The idea of having Boyd kidnapping Katherine to get the money wasn't the original idea. Yost said, "the Elmore [Leonard] rule is basically cutting through the expectation and finding what's the smartest move. So Boyd figures out that Raylan's probably going to be on top of this, so he does the smarter move and he goes right to use Katherine."

=== Casting ===
Despite being credited, Nick Searcy does not appear in the episode as his respective character.

== Reception ==
=== Viewers ===
In its original American broadcast, "Trust" was seen by an estimated 1.72 million household viewers and gained a 0.5 ratings share among adults aged 18–49, according to Nielsen Media Research. This means that 0.5 percent of all households with televisions watched the episode. This was a 5% decrease in viewership from the previous episode, which was watched by 1.81 million viewers with a 0.5 in the 18-49 demographics.

=== Critical reviews ===
"Trust" received extremely positive reviews from critics. Seth Amitin of IGN gave the episode a "great" 8.6 out of 10 and wrote in his verdict, "Justified burned its trust last season but maybe I was wrong in tossing aside the creators' abilities to make something out of the show. Despite the last six episodes blandly going through the motions, 'Trust' capitalized on what they had built. Maybe there's hope this series can finish strong. I'm cautiously optimistic."

Alasdair Wilkins of The A.V. Club gave the episode an "A" grade and wrote, "I've talked quite a bit about the hierarchy that governs the characters on Justified; indeed, I went long on the subject as recently as last week's episode. So it's amusing that the very next episode is one such as this, in which all the traditional rules are suddenly upended, with minor characters repeatedly punching above their narrative weight and one of the major ones quite possibly taking away from us the long-ordained final showdown between Raylan and Boyd. The thing is, none of this contradicts what I was trying to get at in the review of 'Burned'. Rather, the very fact that Justified has invested so much time in setting up the storytelling strictures that govern its world is what makes it so damn powerful when 'Trust' violates them. Every truly great show reaches a point where it must be willing to incinerate its own premise, to discard the last vestiges of a narrative safety net. Ava shooting Boyd — without a moment's hesitation, because if there's one thing Ava knows how to do, it's shoot Crowders — and making off with Avery Markham's 10 million dollars sure as hell qualifies."

Alan Sepinwall of HitFix wrote, "After the events of this episode, I have no idea what's coming next. And I do not care, given how much fun I am having watching it all play out." Jeff Stone of IndieWire gave the episode an "A" grade and wrote, "At this point in the season, nearly all of the various criminals on Justified are keeping secrets from one another, and obviously these secrets had to be revealed eventually. What's so impressive about 'Trust' is that nearly all of the secrets are revealed in a single episode, without any of them feeling unmotivated or out of left field."

Kyle Fowle of Entertainment Weekly wrote, "At some point, it was going to have to come down to this, to Raylan, Boyd, and Ava tangled in a web of lies, misdirection, and miscommunication, stumbling along just trying to survive while hopefully having time to save the people that they care about. We're not completely there yet but in many ways, 'Trust' is the season's story lines coming to a head." Matt Zoller Seitz of Vulture gave the episode a perfect 5 star rating out of 5 and wrote, "'Trust', directed by Adam Arkin from a script by Benjamin Cavell, is a nearly perfect engine of plot and characterization — like every episode of Justified this season, really, but more mercilessly tense."

James Queally of Los Angeles Times wrote, "I said last week I was not ready to let this show go. Now I'm actually afraid of what happens when it's over, because this is going to result in me sitting on my couch and watching the whole series over again." Sean McKenna of TV Fanatic gave the episode a 4.6 star rating out of 5 and wrote, "'Trust' was another solid episode on the final ride of Justified, and while I have no clue how this whole series is going to end, I'm excited to see it all go down. And I certainly trust it to keep being that satisfying ride to the end." Jack McKinney of Paste gave the episode a 9.2 out of 10 and wrote, "With so little time left in the show it grows increasingly tempting to act as much as prognosticator as reviewer. Just two weeks ago, I would have bet that the show would end with a confrontation between Raylan and Boyd down in the mine beneath the Pizza Parlor; a fitting symbolic end to their relationship as their entwined fates drew them back into the dark where their relationship began. But that was not to be. The plot of the mine has come and gone as have other likely subplots. In fact, with each passing hour the show grows increasingly unpredictable as this week's installment so clearly shows."
