= Starvation (Justified) =

- Justified episode
- Episode no.: Season 5 Episode 12
- Directed by: Michael Pressman
- Written by: Chris Provenzano
- Cinematography by: Richard Crudo
- Editing by: Eric L. Beason
- Original air date: April 1, 2014
- Running time: 46 minutes

Guest appearances
- Michael Rapaport as Daryl Crowe Jr.; Rick Gomez as AUSA David Vasquez; Damon Herriman as Dewey Crowe; Jesse Luken as Jimmy Tolan; Danielle Panabaker as Penny; Stephen Root as Judge Mike Reardon; Alicia Witt as Wendy Crowe; Jeannetta Arnette as Marsha Keyhoe; Justin Welborn as Carl

Episode chronology
← Previous "The Toll"	Next → "Restitution"
- Justified (season 5)

"Starvation" is the twelfth episode of the fifth season of the American Neo-Western television series Justified. It is the 64th overall episode of the series and was written by co-executive producer Chris Provenzano and directed by Michael Pressman. It originally aired on FX on April 1, 2014.

The series is based on Elmore Leonard's stories about the character Raylan Givens, particularly "Fire in the Hole", which serves as the basis for the episode. The series follows Raylan Givens, a tough deputy U.S. Marshal enforcing his own brand of justice. The series revolves around the inhabitants and culture in the Appalachian Mountains area of eastern Kentucky, specifically Harlan County where many of the main characters grew up. In the episode, the Marshals are put under pressure to find Daryl Crowe under any means necessary and they use Boyd for their benefit to get Daryl.

According to Nielsen Media Research, the episode was seen by an estimated 2.04 million household viewers and gained a 0.6 ratings share among adults aged 18–49. The episode received critical acclaim, with critics praising the writing, acting, character development and ending.

== Plot ==
Duffy (Jere Burns) meets with Yoon's associates, claiming that he killed Boyd (Walton Goggins). They are skeptical of his claims and tell him he must find Daryl (Michael Rapaport) by the next day or he will be killed. Daryl, meanwhile, brutally attacks Duffy's bodyguard and forces him to reveal the location of the heroin.

Duffy and Boyd discuss the reunion at their trailer when Raylan (Timothy Olyphant), Tim (Jacob Pitts) and Rachel (Erica Tazel) appear. They want Daryl's location but neither Boyd or Duffy speak, which results in Duffy's trailer getting towed due to expired licensed plates. As Duffy tends to his wounded bodyguard, Boyd decides that the best way to find Daryl is sending everyone after the heroin. Raylan then visits Ava (Joelle Carter) in prison, hoping she could pressure Boyd into helping them with Daryl. Ava refuses to help, citing that they are no longer together and when Raylan threatens to tell the guards to not watch over her, she angrily returns to her dorm.

Boyd shows up at the Marshal's office, intending to help find Daryl in exchange for immunity for his crimes and a chance to leave the state. Raylan and Tim object to having Daryl only arrested for a drug charge instead of shooting Art but Rachel has to accept the deal. Daryl attacks Carl (Justin Welborn) at the bar and gets the location of the heroin. He forces Wendy (Alicia Witt) to get the heroin or he will kill her. Meanwhile, Dewey (Damon Herriman) is still on the run when his car runs out of gas. He steals gas from an old lady's car and is forced to flee when the woman shoots at him with a shotgun, although he is not injured. He returns to his trailer where he fights a customer when he steals his collar. Unbeknownst to Dewey, the prostitutes record his actions on a phone.

Wendy arrives at a barn to pick up the heroin. Raylan, Boyd, Tim and Rachel are nearby, watching her from a camera hidden in the barn. As she is about to open a fridge containing the heroin, she decides not to do it and leaves. However, Raylan appears and arrests her. Raylan tells Boyd that he will need to use a wire and record Daryl confessing to the shooting. Boyd objects but changes his mind when he notices Yoon's associates passing by. In prison, Ava's friend Penny (Danielle Panabaker) is killed by a rival. Someone snitches the killer and everyone blames Ava, something to which her mate says will be very disastrous for them.

Boyd, wearing a wire, meets with Daryl on Audrey's. However, Dewey enters with guns drawn at Daryl and Boyd, demanding the bag of heroin. During this, Dewey proudly admits killing Wade Messer in the woods, alerting the Marshals. Dewey takes the bag and leaves the bar, only to be met by Raylan, Tim and Rachel and is arrested for his confession. Raylan then visits Ava after she calls him, who fears for her life in prison and is willing to reconsider his previous offer. Raylan tells her that Boyd already cooperated and asked for a "clean slate" for him, surprising her. Despite this, he tells her he'll see what he can do for her.

Daryl's lawyer Marsha Keyhoe (Jeannetta Arnette) tells Vasquez (Rick Gomez) that they will have to drop all charges against him as there is no evidence holding him back or they will face a lawsuit. Talking with Boyd, Raylan tells him about Daryl's release and that because they failed to arrest him, Boyd's deal has been revoked. When Boyd complains, Raylan shows up a file containing all of Boyd's crimes and repercussions. But Boyd fires back by mentioning that he knows his involvement in Nicky Augustine's death, which is overheard by Tim and Rachel, although they express skepticism at his claim. Boyd exits and tells Jimmy (Jesse Luken) to take his heroin and meet with him. Unaware to Boyd, Jimmy is being held at gunpoint by Yoon's Mexican connections. After making a deal with Raylan and Judge Reardon (Stephen Root), Vasquez reveals that Kendal will be tried, not as a minor, but as an adult for Art's shooting and will face up to 40 years of prison, shocking Wendy and Daryl. When they demand to know who did this, Raylan coldly says that it was his idea and exits the room.

== Production ==
=== Development ===
In March 2014, it was reported that the twelfth episode of the fifth season would be titled "Starvation", and was to be directed by Michael Pressman and written by co-executive producer Chris Provenzano.

=== Writing ===
The episode featured the death of Ava's prison roommate, Penny, played by Danielle Panabaker. The character was killed off as Panabaker had to start filming on The Flash. The original idea for the episode was different, as another of Ava's roommates was killed while Penny was alive.

Talking about Raylan's coldness in the episode, particularly his scenes with Ava, series developer Graham Yost said, "it was a concern, but it was a good concern. You can see over the course of the series that we're not opposed to showing Raylan doing stuff that makes us wince a little bit. And Tim wholeheartedly embraces that and seeks it out, because that gives more color to his character."

=== Casting ===
Despite being credited, Nick Searcy does not appear in the episode as his respective character.

== Reception ==
=== Viewers ===
In its original American broadcast, "Starvation" was seen by an estimated 2.04 million household viewers and gained a 0.6 ratings share among adults aged 18–49, according to Nielsen Media Research. This means that 0.6 percent of all households with televisions watched the episode. This was a slight decrease in viewership from the previous episode, which was watched by 2.05 million viewers with a 0.6 in the 18-49 demographics.

=== Critical reviews ===
"Starvation" received critical acclaim. Seth Amitin of IGN gave the episode an "amazing" 9 out of 10 and wrote in his verdict, "It took a long, long time to get to this point, but we're finally here. Justified is firing on all cylinders now and, for the first time all season, I'm looking forward to the next episode. If you tuned out earlier, tune in now."

Alasdair Wilkins of The A.V. Club gave the episode an "A−" grade and wrote, "Boyd's moment of horrible realization is subtler than Ava's or Raylan's, but then he's always running schemes within schemes. Still, his recognition of the danger that the cartel represents and his immediate agreement to wear a wire suggest he has precisely the same reaction as Ava and Raylan do when they are confronted with their own lack of control over their immediate futures. This episode is defined by a collective look of, 'Oh, shit.'" Kevin Fitzpatrick of Screen Crush wrote, "It's a lot to take in, and like last week, we suspect that 'Starvation' serves a bit more to set up Raylan and Boyd's rivalry return in the final season, focusing on more immediate consequences in next week's finale, but it's nice to see Justified finally shooting on its A-game again."

Alan Sepinwall of HitFix wrote, "But even though I'm mostly ready for all the Crowe business to be done with, 'Starvation' was a reminder of how effective Justified can be when it wants to be very, very serious." James Quealley of The Star-Ledger wrote, "Despite some narrative oddity and the continued weakness of Darryl Crowe, 'Starvation' was a better episode than most of season 5's offerings. Let's hope we're headed for a solid conclusion and a springboard into a satisfying final season."

Matt Zoller Seitz of Vulture gave the episode a 4 star rating out of 5 and wrote, "In 'Starvation', Raylan Givens seems, for the first time in season five, like a ruthlessly effective cop again — maybe even management material. How ironic that he had to stumble into a high-water mark of competency." Holly Anderson of Grantland wrote, "One episode remains. Raylan's in a corner. Boyd's in a corner. Ava's in a corner. Now Wendy is, too, playing out the final act of this ghoulish Peter Pan fantasy with her brother. Everybody's exhausted and this close to ruination. Everyone's life is ALREADY a goddamn calamity."

Carla Day of TV Fanatic gave the episode a 4.5 star rating out of 5 and wrote, "'Starvation' was an excellent penultimate episode. Justified Season 5 has been building to several confrontations and they were all brought to the brink. It's unlikely everyone will make it out unscathed. After the botched drug deal in Mexico, Judith's death and Art's shooting, the Crowders and the Crowes have plenty to be worried about." Jack McKinney of Paste gave the episode an 8.7 out of 10 and wrote, "'Starvation' isn't a bad episode by any means, but like so many episodes this year, it is surprisingly uneven, made up of varyingly successful scenes punctuated by occasional brilliance."
