= Fate's Right Hand (Justified) =

- Justified episode
- Episode no.: Season 6 Episode 1
- Directed by: Michael Dinner
- Written by: Michael Dinner & Fred Golan & Chris Provenzano
- Cinematography by: Stefan von Bjorn
- Editing by: Steve Polivka
- Original air date: January 20, 2015
- Running time: 49 minutes

Guest appearances
- Garret Dillahunt as Ty Walker; Rick Gomez as AUSA David Vasquez; Damon Herriman as Dewey Crowe; Justin Welborn as Carl; Ryan Dorsey as Earl; Rolando Molina as Aguilar; Bill Tangradi as Cyrus; Natalie Zea as Winona Hawkins

Episode chronology
← Previous "Restitution"	Next → "Cash Game"
- Justified (season 6)

"Fate's Right Hand" is the first episode of the sixth season of the American Neo-Western television series Justified. It is the 66th overall episode of the series and was written by executive producer Michael Dinner, executive producer Fred Golan and co-executive producer Chris Provenzano and directed by Dinner. It originally aired on FX on January 20, 2015.

The series is based on Elmore Leonard's stories about the character Raylan Givens, particularly "Fire in the Hole", which serves as the basis for the episode. The series follows Raylan Givens, a tough deputy U.S. Marshal enforcing his own brand of justice. The series revolves around the inhabitants and culture in the Appalachian Mountains area of eastern Kentucky, specifically Harlan County where many of the main characters grew up. In the episode, Raylan works with the Marshals in order to start an investigation into Boyd, using Ava as an informant. He may found the perfect way to catch Boyd by having Dewey Crowe act as a snitch, but Dewey wants to continue with his criminal life. Meanwhile, Boyd tries to continue his partnership with Duffy and Hale by accepting their offer to rob a bank.

According to Nielsen Media Research, the episode was seen by an estimated 2.17 million household viewers and gained a 0.6 ratings share among adults aged 18–49. The episode received positive reviews from critics, who praised Damon Herriman's acting and deemed the episode as a return to form, with many considering it an improvement over the previous season, citing a more consistent storyline.

== Plot ==
In Florida, Winona (Natalie Zea) talks to her daughter Willa, questioning what is Raylan (Timothy Olyphant) doing instead of being with them. In Nuevo Laredo, Raylan meets corrupt Federal officer Aguilar (Rolando Molina), who insults him and tells him to get out. When Aguilar leaves in his car, Raylan rams his car into Aguilar's, kidnaps him and takes him to the United States in the trunk.

Boyd (Walton Goggins) visits a bank, gets access to the safe deposit box vault and sprays some of the boxes. He later visits Ava (Joelle Carter), offering to help her in the house despite knowing their relationship may be over. At the Marshal's office, Raylan tells Rachel (Erica Tazel) and Vasquez (Rick Gomez) that Aguilar named Dewey Crowe (Damon Herriman) as a witness to Johnny Crowder's death and he could identify Boyd. Rachel and Vasquez explain that Dewey will be released as the jury fell for his claim of innocence of Wade Messer's death and he also has a restraining order against Raylan. Despite the order, Raylan meets Dewey as he leaves prison, telling him he will be extradited to Mexico for being involved in Johnny's murder unless he names the killer. Dewey does not feel intimidated and leaves.

Dewey returns to Audrey's, only to find it seized by the government. He also finds that one of the prostitutes he usually hired now works at a restaurant with the man who previously stole his collar. Ava returns to work at a beauty parlor but she has a talk with Boyd, where he expresses his desire to leave Harlan together for a better life as there is nothing worthwhile about Harlan anymore. Ava does not agree with his plan, as she does not want to abandon her home. At the parlor, she finds Raylan and expresses frustration at having to lie to Boyd while helping bring him down.

Dewey makes his way to Boyd's bar, where Boyd nearly attacks him for robbing the heroin. Dewey asks Boyd for a second chance to work for him but Boyd is not interested and has Carl (Justin Welborn) throw him out. Raylan and Tim (Jacob Pitts) have set up a command base at Arlo's house when they are visited by a man named Ty Walker (Garret Dillahunt) interested in buying the property with cash. Raylan is dubious about Walker's intentions and declines his offer as he suspects he stole the money. Raylan and Tim then confront one of Boyd's associates, Cyrus (Bill Tangradi), at his house. Cyrus tries to escape but Raylan knocks him unconscious with a shovel.

Unable to contact Cyrus, Boyd is forced to hire Dewey to transport a car with his tow truck (apparently using Hot Rod Dunham's old trick of towing a car with a bag of drugs in the trunk). Raylan and Tim decide to pull surveillance off Boyd to follow Dewey, who gets scared at a state police roadblock and drives off the road. When they confront him, they force him to open the bag, suspected of containing drugs. However, they (including Dewey) discover that the bag only contains clothing, revealing that Boyd used Dewey as a decoy. During this, Boyd and his crew rob a bank by stealing the safety deposit boxes.

That night, Raylan pressures a scared Ava to fulfill her obligations as an informant and produce actionable information on Boyd or be returned to prison. Ava states she feels lost so Raylan reminds her about her past when she killed Bowman, uplifting her spirits. At the bar, Boyd's crew open the boxes but find themselves frustrated to find that the boxes do not contain cash as promised but a ledger and deeds, although Boyd seems to be interested in the ledger. Raylan visits Art (Nick Searcy) at his house, who is still recovering from his wound. They both express frustration with their new status, with Art remarking that Raylan could be sent to prison if he kills Boyd in a confrontation unless Raylan himself dies.

Dewey confronts Boyd at the bar for using him as a decoy. Dewey then reminisces with Boyd about Crowder's Commandos (he, Boyd and Devil) saying it was the happiest time of his life, but Boyd believes there's no future left in Harlan and those days are behind them. Boyd then shows Dewey a portrait of his family during the early days of Harlan and how they viewed the future. While Dewey stares at the picture, Boyd shoots him in the head, killing him. Carl wonders if he thought that Dewey was a snitch but Boyd just says he couldn't trust Dewey any more. He instructs Carl to dispose of the body and leaves the bar. The episode ends with Boyd contemplating a sleeping Ava in her bedroom.

== Production ==
=== Development ===
In January 2014, FX Original Programming President, Nick Grad mentioned that the series would probably end with the sixth season, "We like having shows that rate really well, and there’s an instinct that you want it to go on forever. But it doesn't. Another metric that's important to us beyond ratings is, 'What shows are going to be talked about in the next 20 years?' If you're making a great, 80-hour movie, it has to have a beginning, middle and end. Going out at the right time is going to make your show last forever – we want to make shows that stand the test of time." One week later, it was announced that the series was renewed for a sixth season, also announcing that it would be the final season. Chairman of FX, John Landgraf, commented, "we talked about it a year ago. They felt that the arc of the show and what they had to say would be best served by six seasons instead of seven. Regretfully, I accepted their decision." Series developer Graham Yost said, "it really felt in terms of the story of Raylan Givens in Kentucky that six years felt about right." He further added, "we just felt like if this chapter in Raylan's life was about Raylan and Boyd that we could only take it so far, that was basically it. We didn't want to outstay our welcome." Back on 2013, Yost said that if they ran for more than six seasons, they run a greater risk of doing "Elmore light." Star Timothy Olyphant said, "usually when things end, I'm not the first person to find out. It's been wonderful to just be able to see the finish line and enjoy it", referring to the cancellation of his previous series Deadwood.

In December 2014, it was reported that the first episode of the sixth season would be titled "Fate's Right Hand", and was to be directed by executive producer Michael Dinner and written by Dinner, executive producer Fred Golan and co-executive producer Chris Provenzano.

=== Writing ===
The episode featured the death of Dewey Crowe, played by Damon Herriman, who made his first appearance in the first episode "Fire in the Hole". Executive producer Michael Dinner came up with the idea during the summer while star Timothy Olyphant reinforced the idea. The writers were sad about having to kill the character but felt that his death emphasized the stakes for the final season. According to series developer Graham Yost, the breaking point that signed Dewey's fate was in the final scene when he talked to Boyd about Mexico, "that was it. That was Dewey's mistake." For Yost, killing off Dewey was as difficult as having to kill Arlo Givens on season 4 and Mags Bennett on season 2. He further added, "we love Damon. We've had so much fun with him over the years. Other than Boyd, he's one of the few bad guys who survived from the pilot. So that was a hard choice."

Herriman said that he was told about his character's fate while working on the fifth season's DVD commentary. While he expressed sadness, he was impressed by the script. He said, "that was definitely a bit of a shock. It's kind of weird. It's like hearing that someone you know has passed away." He also said, "this is an amazing episode for Dewey and an amazing way to say goodbye to the character. And it's nice that [his death] does actually serve a purpose that resonates through the rest of the season. So I couldn't be happier. I'm just so grateful I got to be on that show and play that role. It's definitely going to be right up there for me as a career highlight for the rest of my life." Herriman further praised the final scene, saying "some of my favorite stuff is in my final episode... that scene with Boyd is a very special scene, because it's a very emotional scene, which is not something you see a lot with Dewey."

=== Casting ===
Despite being credited, Jere Burns does not appear in the episode as his respective character.

In September 2014, it was announced that Garret Dillahunt was joining the series in the recurring role of Ty Walker, "a special ops veteran who spent most of the last decade deployed in combat zones, as a soldier and later a private contractor. Now he uses the skills he developed during his military career in his job handling security for a quasi-legal businessman. But Walker's cold professionalism turns to rage when Raylan and Boyd irritate him." Dillahunt, who worked with Olyphant on Deadwood, was interested in appearing in the series. Yost said, "so then we started thinking about who was gonna be part of the team of bad guys this year, the fresh blood. We liked the idea of ex-military. So we came up with this character, Ty Walker. Once Garret got a look at that, he said, 'I'm in.'"

== Reception ==
=== Viewers ===
In its original American broadcast, "Fate's Right Hand" was seen by an estimated 2.17 million household viewers and gained a 0.6 ratings share among adults aged 18–49, according to Nielsen Media Research. This means that 0.6 percent of all households with televisions watched the episode. This was a 9% decrease in viewership from the previous episode, which was watched by 2.37 million viewers with a 0.8 in the 18-49 demographics. This was also a 24% decrease in viewership from the previous season premiere, which was watched by 2.84 million viewers with a 1.1 in the 18-49 demographics.

=== Critical reviews ===
"Fate's Right Hand" received positive reviews from critics. Seth Amitin of IGN gave the episode a "good" 7.2 out of 10 and wrote in his verdict, "Justified has a lot of work to do to get back to where it belongs, but Season 5 left Season 6 with the material it needed and 'Fate's Right Hand' showed some promise. The once razor-sharp wit in this show has dulled over time, but there's reason to be hopeful. Justified might be on the verge of getting back to something interesting, but for now, we'll temper our expectations."

Alasdair Wilkins of The A.V. Club gave the episode an "A−" grade and wrote, "From the outset, 'Fate's Right Hand' is a far more confident installment of Justified than pretty much anything that aired last season. There's a definite sense that the show is consciously returning to its core strengths, with Boyd's resumption of his bank-robbing career marked by a lengthy pre-credits sequence in which he prepares to go back to his work, maybe even his calling." Kevin Fitzpatrick of Screen Crush wrote, "We'll be sad to lose Justified after only six seasons, but 'Fate's Right Hand' definitely feels like a return to simpler times, and a much cleaner start than anything we had last year. The next couple episodes deftly keep up the momentum as well, but tonight was definitely a strong, if quiet return to form."

Alan Sepinwall of HitFix wrote, "In a series that was always destined to conclude with Raylan going against Boyd one last time, Ava is a huge wild card. Should be interesting to see what she does, and who's still standing by the time we get there. All I know right now is that I felt much more confident watching this episode than I did for most of season 5." Jeff Stone of IndieWire gave the episode a "B−" grade and wrote, "Justified has never been much for a spectacular kick-off, generally choosing to play its hand slowly, introducing several colorful characters and disparate story elements over several episodes, then crashing them all together in a bullet-filled crescendo. So when I say the Season 6 premiere is a little pokey, it’s no slight on my hopes for the season overall, especially since things pick up considerably in the episodes to come. Still, the premiere is mostly set-up, with very few of the touches that have made Justified one of the most successful crime shows around."

Kyle Fowle of Entertainment Weekly wrote, "The final season premiere, 'Fate's Right Hand', takes the first steps toward building to that inevitable confrontation between Boyd and Raylan, and in typical Justified fashion, it's not immediately clear how everything will go down; but the general sense of foreboding means that we have 12 more episodes of a tightly wound cat-and-mouse game to look forward to." Matt Zoller Seitz of Vulture gave the episode a perfect 5 star rating out of 5 and wrote, "The premiere of Justified's sixth season is proof of how the awareness of death can focus the mind. Because this is such a densely packed and intricately structured episode, all built around the idea of old ways fading and a fearsome future looming."

James Queally of Los Angeles Times wrote, "Raylan wants to go back to Florida, to his wife, to the way things were. In a way, Dewey Crowe wanted the same. But if the bullet from Boyd didn't deliver the message clear enough, that’s not the way things work. At least, not in Harlan they don't." Sean McKenna of TV Fanatic gave the episode a 4.4 star rating out of 5 and wrote, "This was such a positive way to start things off for Justified Season 6, and I can only see things ramping up for what should be a fantastic ending that's sure to close out with a bang." Jack McKinney of Paste gave the episode a 9 out of 10 and wrote, "I started out by discussing the ways that a finale can undermine the legacy of a great show, but in this case I think that the better question concerns whether or not a show coming off an uneven season can use a final season to right itself. We will know for sure in 12 weeks, but we sure are off to a good start."
