= Jeannetta Arnette =

American actress

- Education: North Carolina School of the Arts
- Occupation: Actress
- Years active: 1977–present
- Known for: Head of the Class; Boys Don't Cry; Ladybugs

Jeannetta Arnette is an American actress. She became known for her television role as Miss Meara on the situation comedy Head of the Class. She has also appeared in numerous films, including 1992's Ladybugs and 1999's Boys Don't Cry, and guest-starring roles on television.

Arnette grew up in North Carolina and attended high school at North Carolina School of the Arts, studied acting in England and attended college at George Washington University where she began acting in local theatrical productions. She dropped out of college to move to Los Angeles to pursue an acting career there.

In 2006, she co-starred in Tori Spelling's VH1 sitcom, So NoTORIous and played Sarah Jean, an innocent death-row inmate, on CBS' Criminal Minds. In 2014, she played in a recurring role in the CBS series, Extant.

== Filmography ==
=== Film ===
Jeannetta Arnette's film appearances
Year	Title	Role	Notes / Ref.
1977	Teenage Graffiti	Annie	
1978	The Redeemer: Son of Satan	Cindy	
1992	Ladybugs	Glynnis Mullen	
1996	Somebody Is Waiting	Edna Rice	
1998	Judas Kiss	Monica Grimes	
1999	Boys Don't Cry	Linda Tisdel	
2000	Finding Kelly	Alice Johnson	
2000	The Prime Gig	Cheryl	
2001	Your Guardian	Lillian	
2001	The Shipping News	Silver Melville	
2003	Small Town Conspiracy	Donna Jo	
2003	Dunsmore	Irma Pritcher	
2003	Finding Home	Grace	
2004	Sniper 3	Sydney Finnegan	Video
2007	Snow Angels	Louise Parkinson	
2008	Pineapple Express	Sandra Danby	
2008	Middle of Nowhere	Mindy Green	
2010	Beneath the Dark	Shirley	
2014	Angels in Stardust	Jacqueline Windsor	
2016	Hunter Gatherer	Dr. Merton	

=== Television ===
Jeannetta Arnette's television appearances
Year	Title	Role	Notes	Ref.
1978	Chico and the Man	Chongo AKA Lavinia Pemberton	Episode: "Waiting for Chongo"	
1980	Brave New World	Dwightina	TV film	
1980	Camp Grizzly	Jean	TV film	
1980	Brothers	Rhonda	TV film	
1981	Stephanie	Rita Melvoin	TV film	
1981	Hill Street Blues	Jennifer Cross	Episode: "Jungle Madness"	
1982	Take Your Best Shot	Fran	TV film	
1983	Hill Street Blues	Lenore Kramer	Episode: "Gung Ho"	
1983	Three's Company	Det. Green	Episode: "Going to Pot"	
1983	Laverne & Shirley	Marianne Vimvoli	Episode: "The Ghost Story"	
1983	Ryan's Four	Rachel	Episode: "Ryan's Four"	
1983	St. Elsewhere	Louise Garrison	Episode: "Qui Transtulit Sustinet"	
1984	Flight 90: Disaster on the Potomac	Patricia 'Nikki' Felch	TV film	
1984	The Bounder	Bonnie	TV film	
1985	Riptide	Francine	Episode: "Girls Night Out"	
1985	The A-Team	Betty / Sarah	Episode: "The Doctor Is Out"	
1986	The Fall Guy	Chris Travers	Episode: "War on Wheels"	
1986	Hardcastle and McCormick	Melinda Marshall	Episode: "When I Look Back on All the Things"	
1986	The Deliberate Stranger	Barbara	TV film	
1986–1991	Head of the Class	Bernadette Meara	Main role	
1987	Sister Margaret and the Saturday Night Ladies	Helene	TV film	
1988	L.A. Law	Vicki Simonetti	Episode: "Leapin' Lizards"	
1989	Single Women Married Men	Maureen Harrison	TV film	
1992–1993	The Jackie Thomas Show	Sophie Ford	Regular role	
1994	Hotel Malibu	Ms. Robinette	Episode: "Do Not Disturb"	
1995	Pins and Needles	Doris Swanson	TV film	
1995	Touched by an Angel	Dr. Gus Jacobs	Episode: "Interview with an Angel"	
1997	Star Trek: Deep Space Nine	Dr. Loews	Episode: "Statistical Probabilities"	
1998	Grace Under Fire	Maxine	Episode: "Grace Under Class"	
1999	V.I.P.	Dr. Lonnie Hippelman	Episode: "K-Val"	
2000	Chicken Soup for the Soul	Suzie	Episode: "Letters to Suzie"	
2000	Nash Bridges	Ginny Peacock	Episode: "Missing Key"	
2000	The '70s	Doris Shales	TV film	
2000	Diagnosis: Murder	Lana	Episode: "Death by Design"	
2001	The Clark Family	Mrs. Clark	TV film	
2001	Roswell	Dolores Browning	Episode: "Busted"	
2002	The Drew Carey Show	Gloria	Episode: "Family Affair"	
2002–2003	Passions	Flo	Recurring role	
2003	ER	Mrs. Hawkes	Episode: "A Saint in the City"	
2004	Law & Order: Special Victims Unit	Sandra Knowles	Episode: "Haunted"	
2005	Invasion	Ruth	Episode: "Pilot"	
2005	Lost	Calloway	Episode: "Adrift"	
2005	CSI: Crime Scene Investigation	Mrs. Spencer	Episode: "Shooting Stars"	
2006	A House Divided	Elaine	TV film	
2006	Criminal Minds	Sarah Jean Dawes	Episode: "Riding the Lightning"	
2006	So Notorious	Ruthie Rose	Regular role	
2009	Cold Case	Chelsey Simpson	Episode: "Hood Rats"	
2009	Washington Field	Senator Loring	TV film	
2009	Fringe	Dr. West	Episode: "Grey Matters"	
2012	The Mentalist	Sue Overton	Episode: "Blood Feud"	
2013	Perception	Stephanie Nordhoff	Episode: "Caleidoscope"	
2014	Switched at Birth	Ms. Troyer	Episode: "Drowning Girl"	
2014	Justified	Marsha Keyhoe	Episodes: "A Murder of Crowes", "Starvation"	
2014	Extant	Anya Sparks	Recurring role	
2018	Heathers	Mrs. Kelly	Episode: "I'm a No-Rust-Build-up Man Myself"	
2018	Homecoming	Woman With Dogs	Episode: "Stop"	
2021	Impeachment: American Crime Story	Delmer Lee Corbin	Episode: "Do You Hear What I Hear?"	
