= Dark as a Dungeon (Justified) =

- Justified episode
- Episode no.: Season 6 Episode 8
- Directed by: Gwyneth Horder-Payton
- Written by: Chris Provenzano & VJ Boyd
- Cinematography by: Attila Szalay
- Editing by: Eric L. Beason
- Original air date: March 10, 2015
- Running time: 48 minutes

Guest appearances
- Mary Steenburgen as Katherine Hale; Garret Dillahunt as Ty Walker; Justin Welborn as Carl; Ryan Dorsey as Earl; Jeff Fahey as Zachariah Randolph; Don McManus as Billy Geist; Sam Elliott as Avery Markham

Episode chronology
← Previous "The Hunt"	Next → "Burned"
- Justified (season 6)

"Dark As a Dungeon" is the eighth episode of the sixth season of the American Neo-Western television series Justified. It is the 73rd overall episode of the series and was written by executive producer Chris Provenzano and producer VJ Boyd and directed by Gwyneth Horder-Payton. It originally aired on FX on March 10, 2015.

The series is based on Elmore Leonard's stories about the character Raylan Givens, particularly "Fire in the Hole", which serves as the basis for the episode. The series follows Raylan Givens, a tough deputy U.S. Marshal enforcing his own brand of justice. The series revolves around the inhabitants and culture in the Appalachian Mountains area of eastern Kentucky, specifically Harlan County where many of the main characters grew up. In the episode, Raylan debates on his parents' remains while he still continues hunting Ty Walker. Walker has met with Boyd and offered him his participation and help in the robbery.

According to Nielsen Media Research, the episode was seen by an estimated 1.80 million household viewers and gained a 0.6 ratings share among adults aged 18–49. The episode received very positive reviews from critics, who praised the writing, character development and building momentum for the final episodes.

== Plot ==
Ready to pull-up roots, Raylan (Timothy Olyphant) cleans up Arlo's house and burns the contents of his old army footlocker. He makes arrangements to have the family remains interred on the property moved to the town cemetery, but he gives more priority to his mother's remains than his father's.

Boyd (Walton Goggins) is informed by Carl (Justin Welborn) and Earl (Ryan Dorsey) that The Pig died on the shaft and Zachariah (Jeff Fahey) is waiting for him to talk. Boyd assigns Earl to accompany Ava (Joelle Carter) to her house and protect her while he speaks with Zachariah. Zachariah claims the job is too dangerous and demands another $10,000 to continue working, although Boyd only offers $5,000. Earl and Ava arrive at her house, but discover Walker (Garret Dillahunt) waiting for them. He forces Ava to tie Earl to a chair and to tend his wounds.

Knowing Zachariah could lead him to Boyd, Raylan visits him and catches Zachariah getting a box of dynamite to hurry along the tunnelling per Boyd's request. They briefly fight each other, though Raylan decides to spare Zachariah from arresting him. Katherine (Mary Steenburgen) visits Duffy (Jere Burns), who maintains his suspicion that Avery (Sam Elliott) was behind Grady Hale's fate. Duffy then questions Boyd's intentions as they have not heard anything about the planned robbery, to which Katherine states that if their plan fails, the next plan involves marrying Avery and having access to his bank accounts. Art (Nick Searcy) visits Katherine and she provides him with Duffy's information.

Boyd arrives at Ava's house and finds Walker holding her at gunpoint. When Walker puts down his gun, Boyd quickly attacks him and prepares to kill him when Walker reveals the reason why he visited: he knows the combination to Avery's safe. Although he suspects his intentions, Boyd accepts his help. Raylan visits Avery at the empty Pizza Portal, asking for help to conclude the manhunt so he can get back on Boyd, revealing that Boyd has been the thorn in Avery's side. Avery then goes to a radio station to announce he has issued a $100,000 reward to anyone who can help them find Walker.

As Boyd and Walker discuss the planned robbery, Raylan arrives at the house to talk to Boyd. Boyd attempts to distract him, but Ava allows him to enter the house so he does not suspect anything while Walker hides. Raylan then tells them about the reward, prompting Boyd to reveal that Walker is in the house. Walker attacks Earl and attempts to escape, but is shot in the back by Raylan and dies from his wounds. That night, Raylan takes Boyd to the Pizza Portal to get the reward from Avery. He shows them the vault and takes $100,000 in cash. In the shaft, Zachariah lights a fire under the vault to pull off the heist. Raylan feels a light tremor, but does not suspect anything.

Ava is content with the $100,000, but Boyd is still intent on getting the $10 million found in Avery's vault, despite the complexity of the heist. Ava later informs to Raylan, telling him about the mine shaft Boyd is using to tunnel for the vault, though Raylan also has the impression that Ava's been burned. He shares this concern to Rachel (Erica Tazel), warning her about the operation. Raylan looks into Arlo's back shed fearing the worst, but finds it empty while also talking to a hallucination of his father (Raymond J. Barry). The next morning, Raylan decides to let the mortician remove their tombs without exhuming them.

== Production ==
=== Development ===
In February 2015, it was reported that the eighth episode of the sixth season would be titled "Dark As a Dungeon", and was to be directed by Gwyneth Horder-Payton and written by executive producer Chris Provenzano and producer VJ Boyd.

=== Writing ===
The concept on Raylan's storyline was explained by series developer Graham Yost, "the idea of the 'dungeon', as it were… maybe it came up in the room. We were sort of debating it, not entirely landing on it, and as is the usual on this show, we have to just keep going. So Chris and VJ finished the script and sent it to [executive producers Fred Golan and Dave Andron] and me, and we didn't know that Arlo Givens was going to reappear in the story. Chris hadn't asked us. He hadn't mentioned it. He just did it, and we were all frankly blown away, first of all by the audacity of him not even running this by us, but then more than that, it was, as Fred said, 'I don't know that I would've done that, and I'm really glad that you did.'" He further added, "we went back and forth in the editing as to how much we would see of Arlo and in what way, and we really kind of went for the whole notion of not ever explaining it or addressing it and just letting it be. It's not a ghost. It's a figment of his imagination. But it's just something that we did and hope people respond."

== Reception ==
=== Viewers ===
In its original American broadcast, "Dark As a Dungeon" was seen by an estimated 1.80 million household viewers and gained a 0.6 ratings share among adults aged 18–49, according to Nielsen Media Research. This means 0.6 percent of all households with televisions watched the episode. This was a 4% increase in viewership from the previous episode, which was watched by 1.73 million viewers with a 0.5 in the 18-49 demographics.

=== Critical reviews ===
"Dark As a Dungeon" received very positive reviews from critics. Seth Amitin of IGN gave the episode a "great" 8.6 out of 10 and wrote in his verdict, "Justified still doesn't seem to be pointing toward much. We're four episodes away from the end and we're still messing around with the chase of Ty Walker. There's no face off or cataclysm. There's barely a direct challenge (for Raylan or for Boyd). Everyone's strangely in agreement, though there's clearly some surface tension. Despite that, this episode was superbly written. It's dialogue was sharp, it's plotting was smooth, and it ended on a very strong note. It was another great episode by Provenzano and Boyd. If I were a showrunner, I'd be looking to hire these two writers as soon as possible."

Alasdair Wilkins of The A.V. Club gave the episode an "A" grade and wrote, "After last week's brilliant 'The Hunt' had its characters tell some unexpected truths, tonight's episode is defined by so many examples of that hallmark of Justified storytelling: the combustible partnership. This is an episode in which circumstances maneuver together the likes of Boyd and Walker, Katherine Hale and Art, and even Raylan and Avery Markham." Kevin Fitzpatrick of Screen Crush wrote, "'Dark as a Dungeon' brought quite a few other dynamics to enjoy as well, between always-reliable Wynn Duffy and Mike humor, that gorgeous back-and-forth between Katherine Hale and Art over her ex-husband's killer, or really any of the dozen exchanges and character beats throughout, though truly, this was just a lovely hour of television. The endgame remains a bit clunky, between Raylan and Boyd's final confrontation, Ava's allegiance (still), or any of the Markham-Hale business, but good grief if tonight wasn't some fascinatingly complex work on all fronts."

Alan Sepinwall of HitFix wrote, "Given how well Justified is cooking, there is a very large part of me that's gonna miss it. But so much of what has made this season great has been the fact that the creators, and so many of the characters, know that the end is getting perilously near." Jeff Stone of IndieWire gave the episode a "B" grade and wrote, "One nice thing about Justified over the years is that it's never flinched from Raylan's contentious relationship with his father, Arlo. Raylan's an angry, angry man, and the wellspring of all that anger is Arlo. Justified has never sugar-coated their relationship, and it's often gone to some very dark places."

Kyle Fowle of Entertainment Weekly wrote, "As Justified barrels toward its series finale (five episodes to go), it's clear that even if the likes of Raylan, Boyd, and Ava manage to escape Harlan, they can never really outrun their past or change who they are." Matt Zoller Seitz of Vulture gave the episode a perfect 5 star rating out of 5 and wrote, "Although this episode resonated at a metaphorical level, plenty happened plot-wise. But here again we saw one of the great strengths of Justified: its ability to weave together what actually happens and what, in a larger sense, it means." Neely Tucker of The Washington Post wrote, "When Justified is good, it's as good as anything its creator and spiritual guiding force, Elmore Leonard, ever put on screen (and heck, maybe on paper), and 'Dark as a Dungeon', this week's episode, is a diamond-cut gem."

James Queally of Los Angeles Times wrote, "Not a bad episode of Justified, just a weird one. There are only five episodes left in the series, yet 'Dark as a Dungeon' seemed to be in a holding pattern, offering us more meat on past problems in the Raylan and Arlo scenes, than the present ones." Sean McKenna of TV Fanatic gave the episode a 4.6 star rating out of 5 and wrote, "This season has been very exciting, and I can't wait to see how it all concludes. But, like Raylan, I'm definitely going to miss it when it's all over." Jack McKinney of Paste gave the episode a 9.5 out of 10 and wrote, "For most shows, their greatest hits are a collection of moments that can be brought into a clip show complete with a very special guest host. For Justified, greatest hits means pulling a theme from an early season, referencing a moment that worked later on, revisiting the mystery genre that buoyed a later year, and then meshing them all into a more perfect union. We know by now exactly how great the sum of its parts is. The only question that remains is if it can be something greater."
