= Burned (Justified) =

- Justified episode
- Episode no.: Season 6 Episode 9
- Directed by: Don Kurt
- Written by: Dave Andron & Leonard Chang & Jenny DeArmitt
- Cinematography by: Stefan von Bjorn
- Editing by: Keith Henderson
- Original air date: March 17, 2015
- Running time: 41 minutes

Guest appearances
- Mary Steenburgen as Katherine Hale; Justin Welborn as Carl; Kaitlyn Dever as Loretta McCready; Ryan Dorsey as Earl; Jeff Fahey as Zachariah Randolph; Rick Gomez as AUSA David Vasquez; Scott Grimes as Seabass; Jonathan Tucker as Boon; Sam Elliott as Avery Markham

Episode chronology
← Previous "Dark As a Dungeon"	Next → "Trust"
- Justified (season 6)

"Burned" is the ninth episode of the sixth season of the American Neo-Western television series Justified. It is the 74th overall episode of the series and was written by executive producer Dave Andron, co-producer Leonard Chang and Jenny DeArmitt and directed by executive producer Don Kurt. It originally aired on FX on March 17, 2015.

The series is based on Elmore Leonard's stories about the character Raylan Givens, particularly "Fire in the Hole", which serves as the basis for the episode. The series follows Raylan Givens, a tough deputy U.S. Marshal enforcing his own brand of justice. The series revolves around the inhabitants and culture in the Appalachian Mountains area of eastern Kentucky, specifically Harlan County where many of the main characters grew up. In the episode, Boyd proceeds to go with the robbery although certain actions impact its outcome. Meanwhile, worried that Ava might have been "burned", the Marshals get a new informant to report on Boyd's activities.

According to Nielsen Media Research, the episode was seen by an estimated 1.81 million household viewers and gained a 0.5 ratings share among adults aged 18–49. The episode received very positive reviews from critics, who praised the writing, the heist scenes and the performances, with many highlighting Kaitlyn Dever.

== Plot ==
Raylan (Timothy Olyphant) shares his concerns to Rachel (Erica Tazel), Art (Nick Searcy) and Vasquez (Rick Gomez) that Ava (Joelle Carter) may have blown her cover. They consider having another informant close to Boyd (Walton Goggins). So Raylan and Art visit Duffy (Jere Burns), with Art revealing that Simon Poole's documents revealed that Duffy was the snitch that led to Grady Hale's arrest. Fearing he will be killed if he is "burned", Duffy accepts to cooperate with them against Boyd.

Seabass (Scott Grimes) confronts Avery (Sam Elliott) and Katherine (Mary Steenburgen) at their room, demanding a larger sum of money for having betrayed Walker. Katherine offers to give him a diamond bracelet from her pursue but she actually uses the opportunity to use a gun from the purse, killing Seabass. Ava and Boyd discuss what she told to Raylan the previous night when Duffy enters, telling them that Avery is moving the money during a party at the Pizza Portal that evening, provoking him to move up his timetable and suspecting Raylan is involved.

Loretta (Kaitlyn Dever) arrives at her house and finds a headless rattlesnake. Suddenly, a man named Boon (Jonathan Tucker) shows up unannounced and threatens her but leaves without hurting her. Loretta later visits Boyd, suggesting a partnership with her land and know-how matched with his muscle and distribution. Having his sights on Avery's money, Boyd gives his blessing to Loretta's purchase of the farms he's threatened against selling, and for men to protect her for fair wages.

At the Pizza Portal's party, Raylan talks with Loretta, offering her ownership of Arlo's property, which she accepts. Boon joins them in their talk, revealing that he works for Avery and Raylan is disgusted by his personality. Boyd and Ava also show up at the party, despite Avery's previous threat that he would kill them if he ever saw them there. Avery reveals his plan to generously purchase lands and lift up the economy. Boyd questions his motivations and how much money will stay in Harlan, and Loretta names those who have died after refusing Avery's offers. Loretta puts forward her offer to the landowners: to buy them out for cash but keep them in their homes, hire locals for security and farm hands and keep the profits in the county, and names Boyd as her partner. Raylan confronts Loretta about associating herself with Boyd and pulls out his offer as he can't be associated with him.

While Boyd and Duffy head to the shaft, Raylan talks with Ava, who deduces that Raylan knows she has been "burned" and explains she's supposed to tell him the heist is next week but it's actually that night, that she's to start a fire to clear the place out. To her surprise, Raylan tells her to go as planned. At the shaft, Boyd checks the fuse with Zachariah (Jeff Fahey) and immediately tells his crew to start the heist. Ava causes a fire in the kitchen, prompting everyone to leave but Raylan approaches Avery and Katherine to inform them that they are being robbed.

After Boyd lights the fuse, Zachariah attacks him and chains him to a support post, expressing that he won't let Ava be related to a Crowder and leaves the scene. Boyd fails in stopping the fuse and desperately calls Carl (Justin Welborn) for help. Carl returns and helps Boyd pick up a rock hammer to cut loose from the chains. They manage to escape just before the mine explodes. Unknown to them, they are watched by Rachel and Tim (Jacob Pitts), who report to Raylan that they came out without the money and no sign of Zachariah. At the Pizza Portal, Raylan and Avery talk about the failed robbery, with Avery remarking that Raylan used him to get to Boyd.

Boyd confronts Ava, accusing her of conspiring with Zachariah to kill him but she reaffirms she wasn't involved and reminds Boyd she's warned her uncle wasn't right in the head. Despite their failure at the heist, Boyd says he will still go after the money despite knowing it will be more dangerous and more difficult now that Avery moved it. Although the Marshals fail to catch Boyd red-handed, Raylan reminds Rachel that they've got two informants and Boyd is going to go after that money with desperate stupidity when Avery tries to move it, which will give them an opportunity to get him.

== Production ==
=== Development ===
In February 2015, it was reported that the ninth episode of the sixth season would be titled "Burned", and was to be directed by executive producer Don Kurt and written by executive producer Dave Andron, co-producer Leonard Chang and Jenny DeArmitt.

=== Writing ===
Throughout the season, the writers were still working on uncovering who would be the snitch who caused Grady Hale's arrest before settling on Wynn Duffy. Series developer Graham Yost said, "in retrospect, it's hard to imagine any other possibility. He was just the right guy, and it fits with his character."

The episode originally included Zachariah's death after he tried to kill Boyd in the mine but the writers decided to keep him alive for possible story purposes. Yost said, "first of all, Jeff Fahey was fantastic, and was really fun to work with. He came into the whole story wanting to get Boyd for the Crowder sins against Ava, and it felt good he would be the one to at least help Ava try to get away."

=== Casting ===
In January 2015, it was reported that Jonathan Tucker was joining the series in a recurring role for the final five episodes as Boon, "a hired gun of Katherine Hale's ex, Avery Markham." Due to Garret Dillahunt only available for a certain amount of episodes, the writers decided to create Boon to accommodate. They contacted Tucker to try for the role, which was possible after a scheduling change in another project. Yost described him, "we knew we wanted to create a character who really modeled himself after Raylan to one degree or another."

== Reception ==
=== Viewers ===
In its original American broadcast, "Burned" was seen by an estimated 1.81 million household viewers and gained a 0.5 ratings share among adults aged 18–49, according to Nielsen Media Research. This means that 0.5 percent of all households with televisions watched the episode. This was a slight increase in viewership from the previous episode, which was watched by 1.80 million viewers with a 0.6 in the 18-49 demographics.

=== Critical reviews ===
"Burned" received very positive reviews from critics. Seth Amitin of IGN gave the episode a "good" 7.9 out of 10 and wrote in his verdict, "'Burned' was an entertaining episode that capstoned the end of an inconsistent, lackluster building period in Season 6. We know where they're headed: Loretta takes over the criminal empire of Harlan and Boyd goes for the money. Who knows if it actually goes that way, but at least there's something here. Let's hope they make the best of the opportunity and finish off Justified with a bang."

Alasdair Wilkins of The A.V. Club gave the episode an "A" grade and wrote, "'Burned' is another fantastic episode of Justified, and I still haven't mentioned the figure most crucial to its success: Kaitlyn Dever as Loretta McCready, a character who has only appeared five times total since the Mags Bennett season yet is instantly able to command respect as an equal of Raylan and Boyd, let alone of Markham and Hale." Kevin Fitzpatrick of Screen Crush wrote, "An incredible, thread-tightening push toward Justified's inevitable end, and with four hours still to go, there's no telling how much greater one of FX's strongest dramas will get."

Alan Sepinwall of HitFix wrote, "That Boyd failed at his heist only delays several inevitable confrontations this season. And I was enjoying every energetic, sharply-written minute of this hour too much to mind that it was ultimately one big stall tactic." Jeff Stone of IndieWire gave the episode a "B" grade and wrote, "This is a well Justified has gone to repeatedly, but Harlan's denizens defending themselves from threatening outsiders is a running theme, so it's hardly a shock."

Kyle Fowle of Entertainment Weekly wrote, "We're still a few episodes away from what's sure to be an explosive Justified series finale, but 'Burned' gives us a sense of everything that's to come. In a season full of great episodes, this is perhaps the best in terms of execution and engagement with the show's overarching themes. 'Burned' brings almost the entire cast of Harlan together in one way or another and that always makes for something combustible and memorable." Matt Zoller Seitz of Vulture gave the episode a perfect 5 star rating out of 5 and wrote, "This was one of the great Justified episodes, a banquet of action, quotable dialogue, character-enriching twists, and spotlight moments for the actors. It reminded me of watching a lineup of great bands full of brilliant musicians who all got a solo and nailed it." Neely Tucker of The Washington Post wrote, "With four episodes remaining, we are not much closer to knowing who will (or won't) get out of Harlan alive, but we do know more about the prices that will be paid, and we finally meet a man with a gun who just may be quicker on the draw than Raylan."

James Queally of Los Angeles Times wrote, "'Burned' is a tapestry of tension. From the insanely creepy debut of Markham's strongman Boon at Loretta's house, to the quick deterioration of Markham's party from political ploy to tinder box to Zachariah's insane vengeance play, this episode is meant to leave you breathless, and it accomplishes that mission." Sean McKenna of TV Fanatic gave the episode a 4.6 star rating out of 5 and wrote, "This was an intense hour that kicked things into final gear bringing everything you love about Justified and readying viewers and its characters for the remaining, and hopefully exhilarating, episodes." Jack McKinney of Paste gave the episode a 9 out of 10 and wrote, "Classic mysteries derived their tension from the knowledge that there was a single unknown killer in the room. Justified derives its tension from the knowledge that everyone in the room is a killer."
