= Restitution (Justified) =

- Justified episode
- Episode no.: Season 5 Episode 13
- Directed by: Adam Arkin
- Written by: Fred Golan & Dave Andron
- Cinematography by: Stefan von Bjorn
- Editing by: Steve Polivka
- Original air date: April 8, 2014
- Running time: 51 minutes

Guest appearances
- Michael Rapaport as Daryl Crowe Jr.; Rick Gomez as AUSA David Vasquez; Deidrie Henry as Rowena; Jacob Lofland as Kendal Crowe; Jesse Luken as Jimmy Tolan; Don McManus as Billy Geist; Alicia Witt as Wendy Crowe; Justin Huen as Alberto Ruiz; Leslie Riley as Leslie Mullen; Mary Steenburgen as Katherine Hale; Natalie Zea as Winona Hawkins

Episode chronology
← Previous "Starvation"	Next → "Fate's Right Hand"
- Justified (season 5)

"Restitution" is the thirteenth episode and season finale of the fifth season of the American Neo-Western television series Justified. It is the 65th overall episode of the series and was written by executive producer Fred Golan and executive producer Dave Andron and directed by Adam Arkin. It originally aired on FX on April 8, 2014.

The series is based on Elmore Leonard's stories about the character Raylan Givens, particularly "Fire in the Hole", which serves as the basis for the episode. The series follows Raylan Givens, a tough deputy U.S. Marshal enforcing his own brand of justice. The series revolves around the inhabitants and culture in the Appalachian Mountains area of eastern Kentucky, specifically Harlan County where many of the main characters grew up. In the episode, Raylan makes a final stand in order to take down Daryl Crowe while Boyd faces problems from his Mexican crime associates.

According to Nielsen Media Research, the episode was seen by an estimated 2.37 million household viewers and gained a 0.8 ratings share among adults aged 18–49. The episode received positive reviews from critics, while critics expressed displeasure at the season's long story arc and pace, others highlighted the finale as a decent finale to an inconsistent season, with many praising the set-up for the final season.

== Plot ==
The Marshals release an angry Daryl (Michael Rapaport) from custody but keep Wendy (Alicia Witt) in the station. Boyd (Walton Goggins) returns to the bar and finds Jimmy (Jesse Luken) tied to a chair, held at gunpoint by Alberto Ruiz (Justin Huen). Alberto kills Jimmy, to Boyd's shock. He then forces Boyd to help them find Daryl and to contact him. Boyd uses his phone to change Raylan's (Timothy Olyphant) name to Daryl's in order to evade their suspicion.

Raylan tells Kendal (Jacob Lofland) about his new sentence unless he speaks up. Despite being nervous, Kendal maintains his statement. Raylan offers Wendy a chance to arrest Daryl by using a wire but she refuses out of fear that she might be killed. Tim (Jacob Pitts) is assigned to follow Daryl but Daryl causes Tim's car to crash after running a red light. Daryl is then called by Wendy, who was released and is seeing through the lies of the Marshals and explains that she intends to sue them. Despite wanting to leave it behind, Daryl agrees to her plan.

In prison, Ava (Joelle Carter) fears for her life now that she has no protection. In order to avoid problem with the gangs in prison, she starts a fight in the mess hall so that she can be protected by the guards. Boyd fails to convince his captors to turn against Ruiz while he constantly texts Raylan as Daryl. Before Ruiz kills him, Raylan texts back posing as Daryl, telling them he will meet them at Ava's house. At the house, a car pulls up, revealing Tim and Rachel (Erica Tazel), who draw their guns at Ruiz and his henchmen. This starts a shootout, which ends with the death of Ruiz and his henchmen and Boyd's release from custody, although Rachel threatens that she will take his file from Raylan and use it against Boyd someday.

Wendy meets with Daryl at Audrey's and they discuss the situation with Kendal. When he confesses to shooting Art, Wendy reveals that she recorded their conversation on a phone. When Daryl threatens her, she points a gun at his genitals just as Raylan appears. Despite Raylan refusing to shoot, Wendy shoots Daryl in his genitals and then at the throat. Raylan takes her gun and they watch Daryl die from his wounds. Raylan later visits Art (Nick Searcy), who just woke up from his coma. After everyone leaves, Art tells him that Dan Grant offered Raylan a chance of a transference to Florida. He then asks about Daryl, knowing he shot him and despite knowing Raylan didn't kill him, thanks him. He shares the news with Winona (Natalie Zea), who is relieved that he can now spend more time with their daughter.

Rachel and Vasquez (Rick Gomez) tell Raylan that they found a connection in all of his cases: Boyd himself. They tell him they'll go after Boyd using RICO and ask for his help before he leaves, to which he gladly accepts. Ava is released from prison after the truth comes out about the fake stabbing and she meets with Boyd at her house. This makes for an uncomfortable encounter after their previous conversation, ending when Ava shuts the door to take a bath. Boyd attempts to break his partnership with Duffy (Jere Burns) and Katherine Hale (Mary Steenburgen), but they actually want his experiences in bank robbing, which interests him. That night, Ava meets with Raylan at a bridge; she was released from prison under the condition that she would help the Marshals against Boyd. Ava remains scared for her safety but Raylan assures her he will protect her.

== Production ==
=== Development ===
In March 2014, it was reported that the thirteenth episode of the fifth season would be titled "Restitution", and was to be directed by Adam Arkin and written by executive producer Fred Golan and executive producer Dave Andron.

=== Writing ===
On Ava's decision to help bring down Boyd, series developer Graham Yost said, "we needed to get her desperate, but we also wanted to see her on her own and show that she is capable of surviving — it's just really tough. Our idea was Ava keeps her head above water, just barely, but there's only so many moves she can make, and she ends up right up against it. She's done everything she can. We introduced the notion in the previous episode of Raylan understanding how bad her situation is. Our feeling is that he has two thoughts: One is that she could help them get Boyd, although he's gotta question how much he can really trust her. But the other thing is, he doesn't like to see her in jail. As much as Raylan can talk about people riding the rap and all of that, I think he does care for Ava."

On setting up the last battle between Raylan and Boyd, Yost said, "we knew it was a target, that it was our goal. There were certain pieces that we had to get in place by the end of the season."

== Reception ==
=== Viewers ===
In its original American broadcast, "Restitution" was seen by an estimated 2.37 million household viewers and gained a 0.8 ratings share among adults aged 18–49, according to Nielsen Media Research. This means that 0.8 percent of all households with televisions watched the episode. This was a 16% increase in viewership from the previous episode, which was watched by 2.04 million viewers with a 0.6 in the 18-49 demographics. This was also a 5% increase in viewership from the previous season finale, which was watched by 2.25 million viewers with a 0.7 in the 18-49 demographics.

=== Critical reviews ===
"Restitution" received positive reviews from critics. Seth Amitin of IGN gave the episode a "great" 8.4 out of 10 and wrote in his verdict, "'Retaliation' was a limp to the finish line. The episode itself was very good, but for Justified, which prides itself on great, cataclysmic endings, it fell a little flat from disorganization. Sure, Darryl's death was a great moment but this wasn't on par with what we've seen from this series. Season 5 will have to be remembered for a few running threads that worked together, but never unified neatly in the Justified way. It did, however, lead in to what looks like a great final battle between Raylan and Boyd for Season 6, the final season. So we have that going for us. Which is nice."

Alasdair Wilkins of The A.V. Club gave the episode a "B+" grade and wrote, "If the fifth season has taught us anything, it's that Raylan is right, that everything will indeed be fine — for him. But those words ring awfully hollow as a promise of safety to anyone else, and the fact that next season is the end of the line means it's at least possible that Raylan's luck will finally run out. The episode's closing, ominous reprise of 'You'll Never Get Out Of Harlan Alive' has never felt quite so much like a warning." Kevin Fitzpatrick of Screen Crush wrote, "The best it could do, realistically, was to set up a few major pins for the confirmed final season, and wrap up the season 5 threads that hadn’t quite worked, something 'Restitution' mostly accomplishes."

Alan Sepinwall of HitFix wrote, "Most seasons of the show end with a version of 'You'll Never Leave Harlan Alive'. Most of the Crowes fulfilled that lyric. Ditto Robert Quarles, Nicky Augustine, many of the Bennetts, etc. It's a dangerous place. And I wonder how many members of this central triangle will survive it. Mainly, though, I'm glad to be moving on from the Crowes and back to the show's best dynamic." James Quealley of The Star-Ledger wrote, "Justified has never struggled with a finale, and 'Restitution' was a fun ride that completed the late season rescue of an otherwise uninspired batch of episodes. The setup for the final season was excellent, and that last chorus of 'You Will Never Leave Harlan Alive', as our gunfighter walked off in the dark and alone to fight one more day, made me realize why I'll miss this show when it's gone."

Matt Zoller Seitz of Vulture gave the episode a 2 star rating out of 5 and wrote, "The fifth season of Justified is the first one that I'd rather hadn't happened. So many missed opportunities, so many dead ends, so many false starts; and now, an unsatisfying ending. Or I should say, an ending that feels as though it should’ve been a beginning. Season six, unsurprisingly and inevitably, will come down to Raylan Givens versus Boyd Crowder." Holly Anderson of Grantland wrote, "It's served its grander purpose, now, to line up everybody for Season 6, and to telegraph what those last 13 hours are going to involve, and to get us hooting and hollering for what's ahead."

Carla Day of TV Fanatic gave the episode a 4.6 star rating out of 5 and wrote, "At the core, Justified has been the story of two childhood friends who went in opposite directions. Before Raylan heads off to Florida to be with Winona and his daughter, he has one final case in Kentucky. It's going to be a Raylan vs. Boyd showdown. To be honest, I'm not sure how I want it to end." Jack McKinney of Paste gave the episode a 9.3 out of 10 and wrote, "The final hour of the penultimate season of Justified is the right running time, but what we actually came away with is two different finales, one that wraps up the often head-scratching fifth season and a second that sets up the final thirteen hours of one of the best shows on television. So maybe it is really a finale and half a premiere. My score for the night is an average of my ratings for each. One is much better than the other."
