= Rick Gomez =

American actor (born 1972)

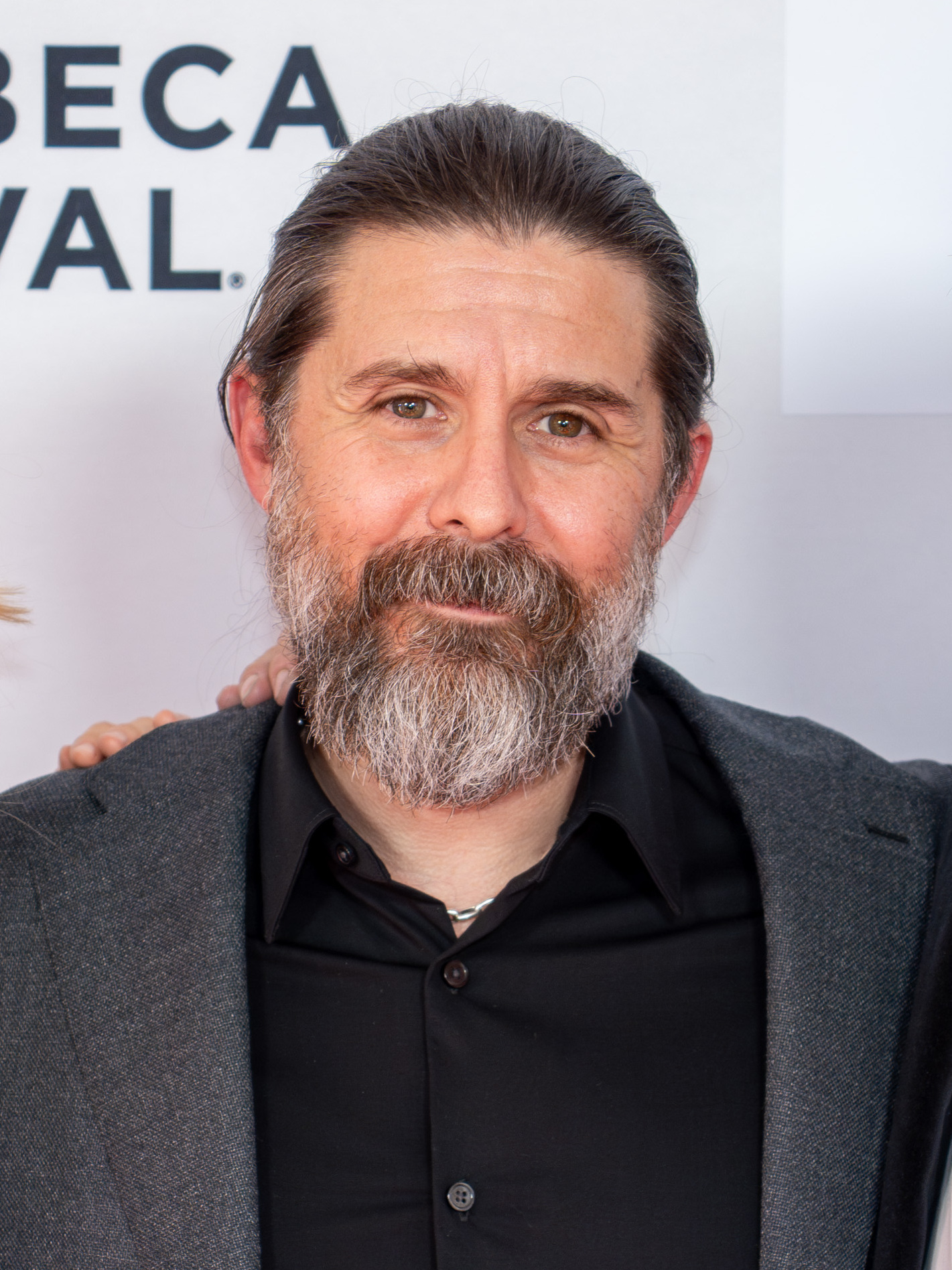
- Gomez in 2025
- Born: Richard Harper Gomez; June 1, 1972 (age 54); Bayonne, New Jersey, U.S.
- Occupation: Actor
- Years active: 1990–present
- Relatives: Joshua Gomez (brother)

Richard Harper Gomez (born June 1, 1972) is an American actor. He is known for portraying Radio Technician Fourth Grade George Luz in the HBO television miniseries Band of Brothers, and "Endless Mike" Hellstrom in the Nickelodeon TV series The Adventures of Pete & Pete. Gomez also voiced Zack Fair in the Final Fantasy VII series. He is the older brother of actor Joshua Gomez.

Born in Bayonne, New Jersey, and raised in South Plainfield, New Jersey, Gomez graduated from South Plainfield High School.

== Filmography ==
=== Film ===
List of acting performances in feature films
Year	Title	Role	Notes	Source
1995	Mercy	Peter		
1999	Three to Tango	Rick		
2003	11:14	Kevin (Paramedic #2)		
2003	Last Man Running	Richie		
2004	Ray	Tom Dowd		
2005	Magnificent Desolation: Walking on the Moon 3D	Alpha Station Commander	Documentary film	
2005	Sin City	Klump		
2007	Transformers	Sheriff		
2009	The Boy in the Box	Officer JJ		
2010	Love Ranch	Tom Macy		
2025	She Dances	—N/a	Also director, screenwriter, and producer	

List of voice performances in television films
Year	Title	Role	Notes	Source
2000	Mary and Rhoda	Video editor		
2004	Helter Skelter	Milio		
2005	Detective	Detective Rodriguez		
2008	Another Cinderella Story	Bacne Spot Announcer		

List of voice performances in animated films
Year	Title	Role	Notes	Source
2003	The Animatrix	Pilot	Segment: "Final Flight of the Osiris"	
2004	The Chronicles of Riddick: Dark Fury	Lead Merc	Direct-to-video	
2006	Final Fantasy VII: Advent Children	Zack Fair		
2009	Final Fantasy VII: Advent Children Complete	Zack Fair		
2007	Tekkonkinkreet	Kimura		
2011	Thor: Tales of Asgard	Loki	Direct-to-video	

=== Television ===
List of acting performances in television shows
Year	Title	Role	Notes	Source
1993–96	The Adventures of Pete & Pete	"Endless Mike" Hellstrom	9 episodes	
1996	Law & Order	Ticket Taker	Episode: "Atonement"	
1997	Hitz	Robert Moore	10 episodes	
2001	Band of Brothers	George Luz	TV miniseries 9 episodes	
2002	In-Laws	Ricky	Episode: "Love Thy Neighbor"	
2003	Boomtown	Detective Daniel Ramos	3 episodes	
2006–07	What About Brian	Dave Greco	24 episodes	
2009	Cupid	Felix	9 episodes	
2010	The Good Guys	Tim McMurphy	Episode: "Supercops"	
2010–15	Justified	Assistant US Attorney David Vasquez	24 episodes	
2011	Burn Notice	William Resnik	Episode: "Necessary Evil"	
2011	Hawaii Five-0	Mateo Vargas "Hulio Castillo"	Episode: "Pahele"	
2014	Reckless	Russ Waterman	3 episodes	
2017	APB	Robert Ruiz	Episode: "Above & Beyond"	
2018	The Crossing	Nestor Rosario	11 episodes	
2019	Blood & Treasure	Chappie	Episode: "The Lunchbox of Destiny"	
2019	NYPD Blue	Craig Pettibone	Unaired pilot	
2023–present	Silo	Patrick Kennedy	18 episodes	

List of voice performances in television shows
Year	Title	Role	Notes	Source
1996–99	KaBlam!	Sniz	Sniz and Fondue segments	
2003	Gary the Rat	Bud, additional voices	4 episodes	
2005–08	My Gym Partner's a Monkey	Windsor Gorilla, Slips Python, James Ant	48 episodes	
2008–12	The Life & Times of Tim	The Priest, Fireman	9 episodes	

=== Video games ===
List of voice performances in video games
Year	Title	Role	Notes	Source
2003	Final Fantasy X-2	Gippal		
2005	Call of Duty 2: Big Red One	Additional voices		
2008	Crisis Core: Final Fantasy VII	Zack Fair		
2010	Kingdom Hearts Birth by Sleep	Zack Fair		
2018	World of Final Fantasy Maxima	Zack Fair		
2024	Batman: Arkham Shadow	Boone Carver / Shrike		
