= Brother's Keeper (Justified) =

- Justified episode
- Episode no.: Season 2 Episode 9
- Directed by: Tony Goldwyn
- Written by: Taylor Elmore
- Cinematography by: Francis Kenny
- Editing by: Victor Du Bois
- Original air date: April 6, 2011
- Running time: 43 minutes

Guest appearances
- Margo Martindale as Mags Bennett; Rebecca Creskoff as Carol Johnson; Jeremy Davies as Dickie Bennett; Kaitlyn Dever as Loretta McCready; Brad William Henke as Coover Bennett; Joseph Lyle Taylor as Doyle Bennett; Mark Colson as Hobart Curtis; Peter Murnik as Deputy Tom Bergen

Episode chronology
← Previous "The Spoil"	Next → "Debts and Accounts"
- Justified (season 2)

"Brother's Keeper" is the ninth episode of the second season of the American Neo-Western television series Justified. It is the 22nd overall episode of the series and was written by co-producer Taylor Elmore and directed by Tony Goldwyn. It originally aired on FX on April 6, 2011.

The series is based on Elmore Leonard's stories about the character Raylan Givens, particularly "Fire in the Hole", which serves as the basis for the episode. The series follows Raylan Givens, a tough deputy U.S. Marshal enforcing his own brand of justice. Following the shooting of a mob hitman, Raylan is sent to Lexington, Kentucky to investigate an old childhood friend Boyd Crowder, who is now part of a white supremacist gang. In the episode, Harlan residents all convene at Mags' home for a celebration. Mags and Carol both reveal their cards over their plans for the Harlan County land, with Boyd playing a deciding role in negotiations. Despite being credited, Jacob Pitts, Erica Tazel and Natalie Zea do not appear in the episode.

According to Nielsen Media Research, the episode was seen by an estimated 2.79 million household viewers and gained a 0.9/2 ratings share among adults aged 18–49. The episode received critical acclaim, who praised the writing, pace, fights, set-up for upcoming episodes and acting, with many deeming it one of the best episodes of the series. For her performance in the episode, Margo Martindale won the Primetime Emmy Award for Outstanding Supporting Actress in a Drama Series at the 63rd Primetime Emmy Awards.

== Plot ==
The Bennetts prepare for their picnic party but Mags (Margo Martindale) is angry upon seeing Boyd (Walton Goggins) and Ava (Joelle Carter) arriving. Raylan (Timothy Olyphant) and Carol (Rebecca Creskoff) arrive shortly and Raylan nearly gets into a fight with one of the visitors, Hobart Curtis (Mark Colson). Nearby, Coover (Brad William Henke) uses drugs after overhearing Mags express disappointment at him.

Carol once again tries to talk with Mags about their land and this time, Mags accepts to have a talk inside her house. Before entering, Carol kisses Raylan in the lips "for luck". She enters and finds Boyd also there with Mags, as Boyd is owner of a desired land. Carol makes an offer to Mags, who refuses again. Mags then gives a counter-offer: triple the amount of money that Carol is offering plus a 4% in the company's shares. Carol refuses but Mags reveals that the land will need a road in order to make it valuable and as Mags, Boyd, Arlo and Helen Givens own the land, Black Pike won't have the resources to mine without an existing road, forcing it to move to another location. Carol contacts the company and they finally settle a deal to buy the land although Carol is still perplexed at Mags betraying her community after supporting them in the church meeting. Mags congratulates Boyd on his play for the Givens lands, but warns him to stay out of the marijuana business, run by the Bennetts. They shake on it, and Boyd shares a celebratory dance with Ava.

Feeling defeated, Carol has Raylan take her to the hotel room before she leaves for Cincinnati. At the Bennett picnic, Loretta (Kaitlyn Dever) helps Coover with lifting a beer keg on his trunk when she notices Coover wearing her dad's watch. Later that night, she visits Coover and gives him a special joint filled with formaldehyde. Coover expresses jealously over Mags' favoritism of Loretta and briefly passes out. Loretta inspects the house and finds her dad's watch with a unique engraving inside, prompting her to cry upon realizing they killed him. She calls Raylan through the burner phone he gave her to tell him everything when Coover finds her and attacks her. Raylan immediately turns back on the road to save her.

Coover explains the situation to Dickie (Jeremy Davies), who tries to calm him down. However, Dickie just worsens the situation by teasing Coover and Coover attacks him, strangling him until Dickie falls unconscious. During the chaos, Loretta escapes from the RV while Coover chases after her. Raylan revives Dickie and tortures him to give him the possible location of Coover. Raylan drives to the woods to find Loretta unconscious but then Coover attacks him and tries to throw him into the mineshaft to his death. Loretta appears, pointing a gun at Coover. With Coover distracted, Raylan shoots Coover in the neck and his corpse falls into the mineshaft. Raylan then comforts Loretta, grieving over the incident and the discovery of her dad's fate. Doyle (Joseph Lyle Taylor) wakes Mags in the middle of the night to give her the news.

The next day, Raylan reports to Mullen (Nick Searcy) that Loretta has been taken to a hospital and is now in the custody of Child Protective Services. Coover and Walt's bodies are recovered from the mineshaft. Doyle shows up with a grieving Mags asking to see Loretta but Raylan tells her it will not be possible. Mags then turns to her cold persona and leaves the scene with Doyle.

== Production ==
The episode was dedicated to the memory of Derek Hotsinpiller and John Perry, two U.S. Deputy Marshals who died in 2011.

== Reception ==
=== Viewers ===
In its original American broadcast, "Brother's Keeper" was seen by an estimated 2.79 million household viewers and gained a 0.9/2 ratings share among adults aged 18–49, according to Nielsen Media Research. This means that 0.9 percent of all households with televisions watched the episode, while 2 percent of all households watching television at that time watched it. This was a 5% increase in viewership from the previous episode, which was watched by 2.64 million viewers with a 0.9/2 in the 18-49 demographics.

=== Critical reviews ===
"Brother's Keeper" received critical acclaim. Scott Tobias of The A.V. Club gave the episode an "A" grade and wrote, "'Brother's Keeper' is a heartbreaker of an episode, but the heartbreak arrives stealthily, because there's so much intrigue and treachery first. Yes, the seeds are planted for Coover/Loretta conflict in the very first scene but Mags' 'big 'ole whoop-tee-doo' takes center stage for most of it, as Black Pike, the Bennetts, and an opportunistic Boyd Crowder finally put their cards on the table."

Alan Sepinwall of HitFix wrote, "Where FX sends some of its series out in large chunks (if not as entire seasons), Justified is one of the ones where I only get to see them one or two at a time. I have yet to see the episode after this one, and while I'm glad to be able to write this review without it being colored by what happens next, after the last 10 or so minutes of 'Brother’s Keeper,' I'm damn dying to see it already." Todd VanDerWerff of Los Angeles Times wrote, "'Brother's Keeper' is my new favorite episode of Justified ever made. If I were going to make a list of my 100 favorite TV episodes, it would stand a good shot at making it on there (and I've seen a lot of TV over the years)."

Dan Forcella of TV Fanatic gave the episode a 4.5 star rating out of 5 and wrote, "There was a whole lot of feeling of finality at the end of this one, as the deal with Black Pike was done, Loretta was saved and sent to child services, and the Bennetts seemed to be in remission for a while. If this gives us a bit of a break from all the excitement for an episode or two, I'm fine with that. Give me a couple of stand alone eps before heading down the final stretch."
