= Debts and Accounts =

- Justified episode
- Episode no.: Season 2 Episode 10
- Directed by: John David Coles
- Written by: Chris Provenzano
- Cinematography by: Francis Kenny
- Editing by: Bill Johnson
- Original air date: April 13, 2011
- Running time: 41 minutes

Guest appearances
- Margo Martindale as Mags Bennett; Mark Colson as Hobart Curtis; Jeremy Davies as Dickie Bennett; Kaitlyn Dever as Loretta McCready; Linda Gehringer as Helen Givens; David Meunier as Johnny Crowder; William Ragsdale as Gary Hawkins; Kevin Rankin as Derek "Devil" Lennox; Richard Speight Jr. as Jed Berwind; Joseph Lyle Taylor as Doyle Bennett

Episode chronology
← Previous "Brother's Keeper"	Next → "Full Commitment"
- Justified (season 2)

"Debts and Accounts" is the tenth episode of the second season of the American Neo-Western television series Justified. It is the 23rd overall episode of the series and was written by co-producer Chris Provenzano and directed by John David Coles. It originally aired on FX on April 13, 2011.

The series is based on Elmore Leonard's stories about the character Raylan Givens, particularly "Fire in the Hole", which serves as the basis for the episode. The series follows Raylan Givens, a tough deputy U.S. Marshal enforcing his own brand of justice. Following the shooting of a mob hitman, Raylan is sent to Lexington, Kentucky to investigate an old childhood friend Boyd Crowder, who is now part of a white supremacist gang. In the episode, Harlan's criminal community begins to shift in the wake of Mags' deal with Black Pike, as Boyd begins rebuilding his criminal empire and Dickie goes behind his mother's back to set up his own operation. Despite being credited, Jacob Pitts and Erica Tazel do not appear in the episode.

According to Nielsen Media Research, the episode was seen by an estimated 2.50 million household viewers and gained a 0.9/2 ratings share among adults aged 18–49. The episode received very positive reviews from critics, who hailed the acting and character development despite some citing the "slow" pace of the episode.

== Plot ==
Mullen (Nick Searcy) informs Raylan (Timothy Olyphant) that the Bennetts categorized Walt's death as the result of Coover killing him for his watch. During their discussion, Mullen indirectly refers to Winona's (Natalie Zea) actions in the evidence room, claiming "it never happened".

Boyd (Walton Goggins) tells Ava (Joelle Carter) that he is moving out of her house because he can no longer avoid committing crimes as she made him promise, and thanks her for everything. Mags (Margo Martindale) meets with Helen (Linda Gehringer) to give her her share of the deal with Black Pike. Mags is then confronted by Hobart Curtis (Mark Colson) for selling out her land, mocking Coover's death but Mags threatens him to never disrespect her again. Winona tells Raylan that she intends to divorce Gary (William Ragsdale), surprising Raylan. Raylan is then called by Loretta (Kaitlyn Dever), who is struggling to adapt to her new foster house. Raylan convinces her to try it as it could be good for her life.

Mags informs Doyle (Joseph Lyle Taylor) and Dickie (Jeremy Davies) about their new directions, leaving Dickie a share of marijuana but telling him that he will be cut off from the main activities. He is told not to pursue Raylan as Mags blames Dickie for Coover's death. He is also told that Boyd retained his part of the deal and can do whatever he wants and Dickie can't stop him from anything. Dickie secretly starts conspiring with associate Jed Berwind (Richard Speight Jr.) to set up his own crime operation.

Meanwhile, Boyd visits his cousin Johnny (David Meunier), revealed to be still alive after having been shot in the chest by Bo and now forced to live with a wheelchair. Although Johnny blames Boyd for his condition, he is interested when Boyd says he plans to give control of Harlan County to the Crowders. They then contact former associate Derek "Devil" Lennox (Kevin Rankin) to join them, which he accepts. While meeting at a bar, they are approached by Dickie, who lies about Boyd's control of the land and claims he now owns Boyd's territories, offering him to join Dickie before he leaves the bar. While Devil and Johnny dislike Dickie, Boyd seems interested in the idea.

Raylan then talks with Winona, who says that her divorce seems imminent as she and Gary are "done". They then consider leaving Harlan and moving back to Glynco, Georgia although Winona is still hesitant. While driving in the car, Raylan and Winona are attacked by hitmen, forcing them to hide in a warehouse. Raylan manages to kill the hitmen and meets with Winona as the sirens are heard. Winona decides to move to Glynco with Raylan.

Boyd visits Ava at her house and she kisses him.

== Reception ==
=== Viewers ===
In its original American broadcast, "Debts and Accounts" was seen by an estimated 2.50 million household viewers and gained a 0.9/2 ratings share among adults aged 18–49, according to Nielsen Media Research. This means that 0.9 percent of all households with televisions watched the episode, while 2 percent of all households watching television at that time watched it. This was a 11% decrease in viewership from the previous episode, which was watched by 2.79 million viewers with a 0.9/2 in the 18-49 demographics.

=== Critical reviews ===
"Debts and Accounts" received very positive reviews from critics. Scott Tobias of The A.V. Club gave the episode an "A−" grade and wrote, "Logically, the hour should be denouement, but there are four episodes left, so 'Debts And Accounts' must do two seemingly contrary things at once: Take stock of the profound, life-changing events that have just taken place and regain momentum for the homestretch. And for the most part, tonight's Justified has done both brilliantly."

Alan Sepinwall of HitFix wrote, "After last week's series' high point, Justified offers up a less exciting, albeit still very strong episode, the sort of bridging episode that's necessary a few times a season on a drama with the kind of narrative ambition Graham Yost and company are demonstrating of late." Emily St. James of Los Angeles Times wrote, "'Debts and Accounts' isn't as good as the last few episodes, but it's a necessary one, letting the audience in on how the characters are feeling about everything that's happened and getting them in place for the big finale to come. Not a lot actually happens in terms of plot movement in 'Debts,' but by the end, it's hard not to feel like everybody's in grave danger."

Dan Forcella of TV Fanatic gave the episode a 4.5 star rating out of 5 and wrote, "'Debts and Accounts,' while not as epic as 'Brother's Keeper,' was another fantastic episode in what has been my favorite season of television in 2011. Add to it all that fantastic smooch between Boyd and Ava at the end, and how could you not have been a fan?"
