= Justified season 2 =

Justified
- Season 2
- Season 2 DVD cover
- No. of episodes: 13

Release
- Original network: FX
- Original release: February 9 – May 4, 2011

Season chronology
- ← Previous; Season 1 Next → Season 3

The second season of the American neo-Western television series Justified premiered on February 9, 2011, on FX, and concluded on May 4, 2011, consisting of 13 episodes. The series was developed by Graham Yost based on Elmore Leonard's novels Pronto and Riding the Rap and his short story "Fire in the Hole". Its main character is Raylan Givens, a deputy U.S. Marshal. Timothy Olyphant portrays Givens, a tough federal lawman, enforcing his own brand of justice in his Kentucky hometown. The series is set in the city of Lexington, Kentucky, and the hill country of eastern Kentucky, specifically in and around Harlan.

== Cast and characters ==
=== Main ===
- Timothy Olyphant as Raylan Givens, a suave deputy U.S. marshal who is tangled up with the criminal Bennett family.
- Nick Searcy as Art Mullen, the chief deputy of Lexington's marshals office.
- Joelle Carter as Ava Crowder, Boyd's sister-in-law who takes him in following the events of the first season.
- Jacob Pitts as Tim Gutterson, a Lexington deputy marshal.
- Erica Tazel as Rachel Brooks, a Lexington deputy marshal.
- Natalie Zea as Winona Hawkins, Raylan's court reporter ex-wife who begins seeing him again.
- Walton Goggins as Boyd Crowder, Raylan's intelligent nemesis who tries to work a legitimate job at the Black Pike Coal mining company.

=== Recurring ===
- Jeremy Davies as Dickie Bennett, Mags's cunning son who walks with a limp because of a fight he had with Raylan when they were children.
- Joseph Lyle Taylor as Doyle Bennett, Mags's oldest son and the corrupt local chief of police.
- Margo Martindale as Maggie "Mags" Bennett, the deceptively kind matriarch of the Bennetts.
- Kaitlyn Dever as Loretta McCready, the teenage daughter of a local marijuana grower who becomes involved with the Bennett family against her will.
- Brad William Henke as Coover Bennett, Mags's largest, youngest, and dimmest son.
- Peter Murnik as Tom Bergen, Raylan's state trooper friend.
- Raymond J. Barry as Arlo Givens, Raylan's criminal father who is under house arrest after colluding with Boyd's father.
- William Ragsdale as Gary Hawkins, Winona's estranged husband who becomes bitter after she plans to divorce him.
- Linda Gehringer as Helen Givens, Raylan's maternal aunt and stepmother.
- David Meunier as Johnny Crowder, Boyd's cousin who is left paraplegic after being shot by his uncle.
- Kevin Rankin as Derek "Devil" Lennox, a former henchman of Boyd's who gets re-involved with him.
- Rebecca Creskoff as Carol Johnson, the vice president of Black Pike who seeks to buy up Harlan land.
- William Gregory Lee as Nick Mooney, one of Doyle's deputies.
- Jere Burns as Wynn Duffy, a volatile and dangerous Dixie Mafia enforcer who again gets involved with Gary.
- Damon Herriman as Dewey Crowe, Boyd's dim-witted former henchman who now does drug runs for the Dixie Mafia.
- Jonathan Kowalsky as Mike Cosmatopolis, Duffy's bodyguard.
- Richard Speight Jr. as Jed Berwind, a Bennett man that works mainly with Dickie.
- Abby Miller as Ellen May, a prostitute that crosses Raylan's path multiple times.

=== Guest ===
- Jim Beaver as Shelby Parlow, the foreman at a Black Pike site.
- Steven Flynn as Emmitt Arnett, a Dixie Mafia higher-up.
- James LeGros as Wade Messer, a petty criminal who crosses paths with Loretta.
- Stephen Root as Mike Reardon, an eccentric and harsh judge who is ruling over a case involving Black Pike.

== Production ==
FX ordered a second season of 13 episodes on May 3, 2010.

=== Casting ===
Walton Goggins, who had a recurring role in the first season as Boyd Crowder, was promoted to series regular beginning with the second season.

=== Filming ===
Episodes were shot in California. The small town of Green Valley, California often doubles for Harlan, Kentucky.

== Episodes ==
No. overall	No. in season	Title	Directed by	Written by	Original release date	US viewers (millions)
14	1	"The Moonshine War"	Adam Arkin	Story by : Elmore Leonard & Graham Yost; Teleplay by : Graham Yost	February 9, 2011	3.47
Raylan follows and incapacitates Boyd before he can kill Gio Reyes's niece. He takes her to Miami and orders Reyes to square things between them, backed by the local chief deputy marshal. Raylan is offered his job in Miami back, but he declines and returns to Kentucky. Harlan marijuana grower Walt McCready calls the marshals after a pedophile harasses his teenage daughter Loretta. Raylan learns that they both work for the criminal Bennett family, who the Givens family has a long-standing feud with. Sensing police presence, he kidnaps Loretta and flees, though Raylan tracks him down and arrests him. Bennett matriarch Mags fatally poisons Walt for talking to the police and decides to raise Loretta herself. Raylan learns that Boyd has gotten a job with the Black Pike Coal mining company.
15	2	"The Life Inside"	Jon Avnet	Benjamin Cavell	February 16, 2011	2.41
Boyd, now living with Ava, insists to a doubtful Raylan that he is doing honest work. Raylan demands Arlo Givens return the money he was supposed to give Bo Crowder, (Note: As depicted in "Fathers and Sons".) though he pretends he gave it to Bo. Mags tells Loretta that Walt left town. Raylan and Tim are assigned to escort heavily pregnant inmate Jamie Berglund to a hospital. She is freed by a pair of criminals who are working with her and the guard father to sell the child, though unbeknownst to her, the guard has instructed criminal Jess Timmons to kill her after the birth. The marshals pull the guard's phone records and learn of his association with the criminals, while Timmons kills his accomplice when he objects to killing Berglund. The marshals arrive and Tim kills him to save her. The guard's separated wife requests to adopt the baby. A now estranged Gary Hawkins promises Raylan he will win Winona back.
16	3	"The I of the Storm"	Peter Werner	Dave Andron	February 23, 2011	2.59
Two men rob a Dixie Mafia drug trafficking bus that Dewey Crowe is on. He disguises himself as Raylan and robs them back, and Raylan realizes who was responsible when he is called by police chief and Mags's son Doyle. The robbers attack just as Raylan confronts Dewey. Doyle saves them, but kills the robbers after they explain his brothers Coover and Dickie hired them. Ava tells Raylan that Boyd is allowed to stay with her so long as he does honest work, though he warns her to be wary of him. White supremacist Kyle Easterly notices Boyd at work and tries to get him involved in criminal activity, so Boyd drags him with his car to ward him off.
17	4	"For Blood or Money"	John Dahl	Wendy Calhoun	March 2, 2011	2.64
Deputy marshal Rachel Brooks's parolee brother-in-law Clinton Moss attacks the manager of his halfway house for not letting him off work for his son's birthday. He steals a drug dealer's car but is intercepted by the marshals at his son's school, so he decides to meet him at a restaurant. The dealer and manager arrive simultaneously. Rachel arrives and kills the former before he can hurt anyone, though the present Clinton bought for his son is destroyed in the crossfire. She allows the boy to visit him in custody. Gary decides to officially divorce Winona, though Raylan suspects this to be a manipulation tactic. Kyle asks Boyd if he wants to take part in a robbery that would make him out to be heroic.
18	5	"Cottonmouth"	Michael Watkins	Taylor Elmore	March 9, 2011	2.71
An imprisoned Dewey tells Raylan that the Bennetts are planning "something big." Raylan realizes Walt's welfare checks are being cashed with forged signatures and Arlo gives him the location of Harlan's forging man. He tricks Coover into going to the man's place, confirming that the Bennetts are involved in Walt's disappearance. Boyd overhears Kyle and his friends plotting to kill him during the robbery, so he leaves a note for Ava to call Kyle's phone at a certain time. The men take money guarded by foreman Shelby Parlow and plan to blow up the mine with him and Boyd inside. Ava calls Kyle, which Boyd uses to kick the other men out of the trailer, claiming the cell signal will interfere with the explosives. He hides them in the money, killing Kyle and his friends when he detonates them. Parlow agrees to cover for Boyd and he returns to Ava, giving her the remaining money and deciding to go back to his criminal life. Raylan gives Loretta his number to call if she is ever in danger.
19	6	"Blaze of Glory"	Jon Avnet	Benjamin Cavell	March 16, 2011	2.37
Ava backs up Boyd's claim of being forced into the robbery to the ATF. Gary takes out a mortgage loan on his and Winona's house so he can buy a racehorse. Frustrated, she steals a hundred dollar bill from her courthouse's evidence locker, only for it to be stolen when the bank she checks its validity at is robbed, forcing her to ask Raylan for help. The oldest robber sets up his accomplices with a fake suicide vest, sends them to rob another bank, and anonymously calls the police. Raylan arrives and quickly arrests them. Art realizes the man was misleading them and tracks him to an airfield before he can flee with the money. Raylan recovers the bill and returns it to Winona.
20	7	"Save My Love"	Jon Avnet	Graham Yost	March 23, 2011	2.22
Winona claims that Raylan took the wrong bill. Gary approaches Duffy with an "exciting investment opportunity." Boyd is promoted to Black Pike's security team by vice president Carol Johnson. Raylan learns that Tim already entered the bills into the county's database and sent the data to the FBI. When he tells Winona, she admits she took all of the money from the locker, so Raylan helps her sneak it back into the courthouse, though Mike Reardon (Note: An eccentric and harsh local judge, first seen in "The Hammer".) interrupts by asking her to transcript an accidental death case involving Black Pike. He ejects the plaintiffs when they refuse to settle down, so they call in a bomb threat that gets the courthouse evacuated. Raylan finds a sniper rifle that would have been used to kill Reardon, and Winona returns the money just before Art can walk in on her.
21	8	"The Spoil"	Michael Watkins	Story by : Elmore Leonard & Dave Andron; Teleplay by : Dave Andron	March 30, 2011	2.64
Boyd blocks Bennett attempts to prevent local landowners from selling to Black Pike, so Doyle has him falsely arrested and Johnson bails him out. Following the bomb threat, Raylan is assigned to protect Johnson at a county meeting. She tries to convince the residents to sell their land to her, but Mags sways them to her side and announces a party at her house. Dickie and Coover attack Boyd, but Ava fights them off. Johnson visits Arlo to ask him to sell, while Helen Givens (Note: Raylan's maternal aunt and stepmother, first seen in "The Lord of War and Thunder".) pays Raylan to leave Harlan with the money Arlo owes the marshals. Raylan stops one of the plaintiffs from killing Johnson, while her brother is caught trying to kill Reardon. Raylan tells Helen he lied about leaving Harlan and keeps the money to return to the marshals.
22	9	"Brother's Keeper"	Tony Goldwyn	Taylor Elmore	April 6, 2011	2.79
At the party, Johnson sits down with Mags, who has made a deal with Boyd behind her back. Boyd explains that Mags was planning to get more money from Black Pike by selling them land that requires a new road, the land for which is where Arlo's house is, which Boyd has convinced him to sell to Mags. Johnson is forced to agree to buy all the land. Loretta notices Coover wearing Walt's watch. She calls Raylan but is caught by Coover, who calls Dickie for help, only to choke him out when he mocks him over Mags's favoritism towards Loretta. Raylan forces Dickie to tell him that Coover is taking Loretta to the mineshaft where they disposed of Walt's body. Raylan is attacked by Coover when he arrives, but Raylan throws him into the shaft to his death. The next day, Mags arrives on the scene and begs to see Loretta, but Raylan reveals she has already been given to child protective services.
23	10	"Debts and Accounts"	John David Coles	Chris Provenzano	April 13, 2011	2.50
Walt's death is blamed on Coover, while Mags disowns Dickie for giving him up to Raylan. Boyd visits Johnny Crowder, now paraplegic after being shot by Bo, (Note: As depicted in "Bulletville".) and convinces him and their former associate Derek "Devil" Lennox to help him take over Harlan. Winona begins to finalize her divorce, and Raylan posits moving to Glynco, Georgia together, where he would work as a FLETC instructor. They are attacked by a pair of hitmen, who Raylan kills, and Winona agrees to move with him. Boyd meets with Ava and the two kiss.
24	11	"Full Commitment"	Peter Werner	Benjamin Cavell	April 20, 2011	2.50
Ignoring Art's warnings not to investigate the hitmen, Raylan stakes out Winona's house. He notices a car watching it and confronts the driver, learning that the company he works for is associated with Duffy and that Gary hired the hitmen. He drags Gary to Duffy in hopes that Duffy will kill him, but gives Gary the opportunity to run, which he takes. Boyd and Arlo rob Dickie's marijuana operation, though Dickie recognizes a masked Arlo's gait. He breaks into Arlo's house while he is out and plans to hold Helen hostage until he gives back his product, but kills her when she pulls a gun on him.
25	12	"Reckoning"	Adam Arkin	Dave Andron	April 27, 2011	2.92
Arlo blames Raylan for Helen's death. Mags refuses to give Dickie to Raylan and laments that she never wanted to be a criminal, but had to take it up after her husband's death. Dickie asks Doyle to kill Jed Berwind, his henchman and a witness to Helen's murder. Raylan saves Jed when Doyle approaches him, and Jed informs him of the robbery. Boyd points out to Raylan that the Black Pike deal has not gone through yet, so Raylan convinces Arlo to pull out of the deal unless Mags gives up Dickie. Raylan prepares to kill him, but his comments about Helen make Raylan change his mind and he instead sends Dickie to prison. After Helen's funeral, he learns that Jed was pressed into confessing to killing Helen, while Mags promises Dickie she will "take care of it" upon his release.
26	13	"Bloody Harlan"	Michael Dinner	Fred Golan	May 4, 2011	2.68
Winona tells Raylan that she is pregnant. Despite Boyd returning the money he stole from Dickie, the Bennetts send men to Johnny and Ava's houses. The Bennett men are all killed, but Dickie manages to shoot Ava and flee. Loretta steals a gun from her foster home and pays petty criminal Wade Messer to drive her to the Bennetts's property, but he alerts them when he realizes she plans to kill Mags. Raylan visits Messer but is subdued by a waiting Dickie. Boyd arrives and saves Raylan, who makes Dickie take him to Mags. Loretta arrives first and corners Mags, while Doyle and his men surround Raylan. The marshals, alerted by Winona, kill Doyle and arrest Dickie. Despite Mags admitting to killing Walt, Raylan convinces Loretta to spare her. Before Mags goes outside to be arrested, she asks Raylan to drink moonshine with her and settle their family feud with a handshake. She dies after shaking his hand, having poisoned her own drink.

== Reception ==
On Rotten Tomatoes, the season has an approval rating of 100% with an average score of 8.8 out of 10 based on 28 reviews. The website's critical consensus reads, "Justified finds its footing in its second season with an expanded cast of characters that enriches its seedy world." On Metacritic, the season has a weighted average score of 91 out of 100, based on 12 critics, indicating "universal acclaim.

Robert Bianco of USA Today praised Margo Martindale's performance, stating: "Like the show itself, Margo Martindale's performance is smart, chilling, amusing, convincing and unfailingly entertaining. And like the show, you really don't want to miss it." Slant Magazine critic Scott Von Doviak praised Olyphant's performance and the writing for this season, observing: "Justified's rich vein of gallows humor, convincing sense of place, and twisty hillbilly-noir narratives are all selling points, but it's Olyphant's devilish grin that seals the deal."

=== Awards ===
For the second season, it received four acting nominations for the 63rd Primetime Emmy Awards—Timothy Olyphant for Outstanding Lead Actor in a Drama Series, Walton Goggins for Outstanding Supporting Actor in a Drama Series, Margo Martindale for Outstanding Supporting Actress in a Drama Series, and Jeremy Davies for Outstanding Guest Actor in a Drama Series, with Martindale winning.

=== Ratings ===
The second season averaged 2.649 million viewers and a 0.9 rating in the 18–49 demographic, improving 9.6% in viewership from the first season.

== Home media release ==
The second season was released on Blu-ray and DVD in region 1 on January 3, 2012, in region 2 on July 18, 2011, and in region 4 on September 5, 2012. Special features on the season two set include deleted scenes, three behind-the-scenes featurettes, and outtakes.
