= Bloody Harlan (Justified) =

- Justified episode
- Episode no.: Season 2 Episode 13
- Directed by: Michael Dinner
- Written by: Fred Golan
- Cinematography by: Francis Kenny
- Editing by: Bill Johnson
- Original air date: May 4, 2011
- Running time: 43 minutes

Guest appearances
- Margo Martindale as Mags Bennett; Jeremy Davies as Dickie Bennett; Kaitlyn Dever as Loretta McCready; James LeGros as Wade Messer; David Meunier as Johnny Crowder; Peter Murnik as Deputy Tom Bergen; Kevin Rankin as Derek "Devil" Lennox; Joseph Lyle Taylor as Doyle Bennett; Raymond J. Barry as Arlo Givens

Episode chronology
← Previous "Reckoning"	Next → "The Gunfighter"
- Justified (season 2)

"Bloody Harlan" is the thirteenth episode and season finale of the second season of the American Neo-Western television series Justified. It is the 26th overall episode of the series and was written by executive producer Fred Golan and directed by executive producer Michael Dinner. It originally aired on FX on May 4, 2011.

The series is based on Elmore Leonard's stories about the character Raylan Givens, particularly "Fire in the Hole", which serves as the basis for the episode. The series follows Raylan Givens, a tough deputy U.S. Marshal enforcing his own brand of justice. Following the shooting of a mob hitman, Raylan is sent to Lexington, Kentucky to investigate an old childhood friend Boyd Crowder, who is now part of a white supremacist gang. In the episode, the Crowder and the Bennett clans go to war over control of Harlan, which results in deadly consequences for everyone involved.

According to Nielsen Media Research, the episode was seen by an estimated 2.68 million household viewers and gained a 0.9/2 ratings share among adults aged 18–49. The episode received universal acclaim from critics and audiences, who hailed nearly every single aspect of the episode, with most of the praise heading towards the writing, pace, directing and acting (particularly Margo Martindale) and some deeming it as a strong ending to a strong season.

== Plot ==
Deciding to move to Glynco, Georgia with Winona (Natalie Zea), Raylan (Timothy Olyphant) asks Mullen (Nick Searcy) for a promotion so he could move to the Federal Law Enforcement Training Centers. Mullen says he will think about it. Meanwhile, the Bennetts start discussing their new plans, which involve negotiating with Boyd (Walton Goggins).

Winona tells Raylan that she is pregnant, which makes him happy as they plan to move out of Harlan. At a church, Boyd and Arlo (Raymond J. Barry) meet with Mags (Margo Martindale) and Doyle (Joseph Lyle Taylor). Mags reprimands Boyd for interfering in the marijuana business but is delighted to see Boyd return the money he stole from Dickie (Jeremy Davies). But Mags is still convinced that Boyd will continue stealing. She has sent hitmen to kill Boyd's crew at their houses. Dickie shoots Ava (Joelle Carter) in the chest and is forced to flee when Devil (Kevin Rankin) shoots and kills many of his henchmen. Johnny (David Meunier) avoids assassination when he blows up his own house to kill the hitmen.

Returning home, Boyd is furious at Devil for failing to protect Ava and forces a doctor to operate on her, threatening to kill him if anything happens to her. Raylan is called back for Loretta (Kaitlyn Dever), who fled her foster home. She escaped with the help of Wade Messer (James LeGros) and intends to kill the Bennetts for her father's death. Wade, a friend of her father, notices her intentions and refuses to let her do it. Loretta decides to abandon Wade and go by herself. Raylan drops off Winona at her job so he can find Loretta. Winona asks Mullen to help Raylan but he declines, saying Raylan asked for free time during the week and can't send other Marshals to help him. Raylan finds Wade in his house, but is then knocked unconscious by Dickie.

Dickie sends Wade to find Loretta while he ties Raylan upside down from a tie and Dickie hits him multiple times with a baseball bat. However, Boyd arrives and forces Dickie to untie Raylan. Dickie pleads for his life, telling Raylan he can take him to Loretta. Raylan asks an angry Boyd to let him have Dickie for a few minutes so he can find her. Loretta finds her way to Mags' house, who greets her and lets her go inside. Dickie arrives at the house, being held at gunpoint by Raylan. Back inside Loretta pulls out a gun and while Mags tries to calm her down, she shoots her in the leg. Outside, Doyle and his crew shoot at Dickie and Raylan, wounding both. Before he can kill Raylan, Doyle is shot in the head by a raid team led by Mullen and Dickie is arrested.

Raylan, Tim (Jacob Pitts) and Rachel (Erica Tazel) enter the house and find Loretta holding Mags at gunpoint, who confessed to poisoning Loretta's father. Raylan dissuades Loretta from killing Mags, and she drops the gun and leaves with Tim and Rachel while Raylan informs Mags of Doyle's death. Raylan stays with Mags, who asks to join her in drinking her moonshine. They both drink and Mags makes peace with Raylan. Raylan realizes that Mags poisoned her own drink and she dies in front of him while holding his hand.

== Reception ==
=== Viewers ===
In its original American broadcast, "Bloody Harlan" was seen by an estimated 2.68 million household viewers and gained a 0.9/2 ratings share among adults aged 18–49, according to Nielsen Media Research. This means that 0.9 percent of all households with televisions watched the episode, while 2 percent of all households watching television at that time watched it. This was a 9% decrease in viewership from the previous episode, which was watched by 2.92 million viewers with a 0.9/2 in the 18-49 demographics.

=== Critical reviews ===
"Bloody Harlan" received universal acclaim from critics. Scott Tobias of The A.V. Club gave the episode an "A" grade and wrote, "Having the season come full circle with Mags falling prey to the same deadly 'apple pie' brew that she used to kill Walt McCready in episode one was perhaps a too-neat bit of writing, but it felt more of a real ending than the messy shootout of season one. And though they give themselves a few loose ends to work with, the writers are now faced with the challenge of rebuilding for season three. The bar has been set awfully high."

James Poniewozik of Time wrote, "It could not have been more fitting that the climax of this fantastic season of Justified, 'Bloody Harlan', came with Mags Bennett telling a lie about her family, encased in a truth about family. Facing Loretta, whose father she poisoned, and staring down her own possible death, Mags tells her that she’ll understand someday when she had kids of her own: 'You do what you must to protect them, even when you know it's wrong.'" Alan Sepinwall of HitFix wrote, "I really can't say enough good things about this finale. I liked but didn't particularly love last season's 'Bulletville', feeling like it sacrificed a lot of what had become interesting in that season's later episodes in favor of just letting Raylan shoot as many bad guys as possible. Here, he doesn't fire a shot and yet this episode was as viscerally exciting as it was emotionally rich."

Mandl Blerly of Entertainment Weekly wrote, "With an episode title like 'Bloody Harlan', we expected a body count in Justified's season 2 finale, and we got it." Todd VanDerWerff of Los Angeles Times wrote, "The mark of a great TV series is that it doesn't just tell us a story or show us fun characters; it finds a way to say something true about human nature, to ask a central question about the characters that might never be answered. After this season of Justified, which I’d easily mark as a great one, the question that applies to every single character on the show is not whether they can get out of Harlan, Ky."

Dan Forcella of TV Fanatic gave the episode a perfect 5 star rating out of 5 and wrote, "This second season of Justified was pretty close to flawless, and in some ways extremely poetic. 'Bloody Harlan' was in itself a great episode, but it wrapped up the entire arc of the year so well that at times it might be difficult to grasp how good the hour actually was." Valerie Ettenhofer of Film School Rejects called the episode "a master class in acting, directing, writing, and American myth-making."
