= Reckoning (Justified) =

- Justified episode
- Episode no.: Season 2 Episode 12
- Directed by: Adam Arkin
- Written by: Dave Andron
- Cinematography by: Francis Kenny
- Editing by: Victor Du Bois
- Original air date: April 27, 2011
- Running time: 41 minutes

Guest appearances
- Margo Martindale as Mags Bennett; Jeremy Davies as Dickie Bennett; Kaitlyn Dever as Loretta McCready; David Meunier as Johnny Crowder; Peter Murnik as Deputy Tom Bergen; Kevin Rankin as Derek "Devil" Lennox; Richard Speight Jr. as Jed Berwind; Joseph Lyle Taylor as Doyle Bennett; Raymond J. Barry as Arlo Givens

Episode chronology
← Previous "Full Commitment"	Next → "Bloody Harlan"
- Justified (season 2)

"Reckoning" is the twelfth episode of the second season of the American Neo-Western television series Justified. It is the 25th overall episode of the series and was written by supervising producer Dave Andron and directed by Adam Arkin. It originally aired on FX on April 27, 2011.

The series is based on Elmore Leonard's stories about the character Raylan Givens, particularly "Fire in the Hole", which serves as the basis for the episode. The series follows Raylan Givens, a tough deputy U.S. Marshal enforcing his own brand of justice. Following the shooting of a mob hitman, Raylan is sent to Lexington, Kentucky to investigate an old childhood friend Boyd Crowder, who is now part of a white supremacist gang. In the episode, Raylan is intent on finding Helen's killer but Arlo knows who is responsible and will try to get there first. Despite being credited, Nick Searcy, Jacob Pitts and Erica Tazel do not appear in the episode.

According to Nielsen Media Research, the episode was seen by an estimated 2.92 million household viewers and gained a 0.9/2 ratings share among adults aged 18–49. The episode received critical acclaim, with critics praising the writing and strong acting. For their performances in the episode, Timothy Olyphant and Jeremy Davies were nominated for the Primetime Emmy Award for Outstanding Lead Actor in a Drama Series and Primetime Emmy Award for Outstanding Guest Actor in a Drama Series at the 63rd Primetime Emmy Awards.

== Plot ==
A shaken Raylan (Timothy Olyphant) arrives at Helen's house as forensics take her body. Meanwhile, Boyd (Walton Goggins) is serving breakfast to his crew when Ava (Joelle Carter) notifies him of Helen's death. Boyd knows that Arlo's limp identified him in the robbery.

Raylan finds Arlo (Raymond J. Barry) loading a shotgun, intending to take revenge against the Bennetts, deducing Dickie (Jeremy Davies) killed her. Arlo blames Raylan for Helen's death as he killed Coover Bennett, although Arlo hides the fact that he prompted Dickie and his crew to attack. Raylan questions Mags (Margo Martindale) about Dickie's location, as Arlo will likely kill him if he gets to him first. Mags says nothing but confesses that she cut off Dickie from her operations. After Raylan leaves due to a tip regarding Arlo, Mags calls Doyle (Joseph Lyle Taylor) about the escalating problem.

Raylan finds Arlo in Dickie's RV and both talk about Helen before Raylan arrests Arlo for breaking in and gun possession. Arlo tries to buy his exit by detailing Dickie's possible location but Raylan has him jailed anyway. Mags and Doyle find Dickie at a cabin and Mags hits him for his actions, which could have repercussions for their activities. But Dickie explains that he has a plan to get themselves out of Raylan's track: his plan involves Doyle killing Dickie's associate Jed Berwind (Richard Speight Jr.) for "resisting arrest" and avoid Raylan from finding their connections. Doyle visits Jed that night but Raylan unexpectedly arrives and forces Doyle to leave. Raylan promises Jed protection for him and his family for his testimony. Jed confesses that Dickie killed Helen as he was there but is unsure of Dickie's location. He also tells Raylan that Arlo and Boyd cooperated to steal Dickie's marijuana business.

Raylan confronts Boyd about his actions but Boyd explains that as the Black Pike deal is not official yet, he can use it as his advantage to get Mags to reveal Dickie's location. He releases Arlo in order to talk to Mags, who reluctantly gives him Dickie's cabin's location. Raylan and Doyle then arrive at Dickie's cabin, arresting him as Mags betrayed him. However, Raylan knocks Doyle unconscious and forces Dickie to walk through the woods. A desperate Dickie pleads for his life but Raylan reprimands him due to his strong bond with Helen. Raylan's comments made him change his mind and instead of executing Dickie, he just knocks him unconscious.

The next day, Boyd, Ava and Winona (Natalie Zea) join Raylan on Helen's funeral at her house. Mags officially signs the Black Pike deal and instructs a woman to visit Jed in jail. After the funeral, Raylan discovers that Jed changed his testimony and now claimed to be Helen's killer, forcing the police to release Dickie from jail. Dickie is picked up by Doyle and Mags, who comforts him as he cries due to Raylan's threat. Mags promises she'll take care of it.

== Reception ==
=== Viewers ===
In its original American broadcast, "Reckoning" was seen by an estimated 2.92 million household viewers and gained a 0.9/2 ratings share among adults aged 18–49, according to Nielsen Media Research. This means that 0.9 percent of all households with televisions watched the episode, while 2 percent of all households watching television at that time watched it. This was a 16% increase in viewership from the previous episode, which was watched by 2.50 million viewers with a 0.9/2 in the 18–49 demographics.

=== Critical reviews ===
"Reckoning" received critical acclaim. Scott Tobias of The A.V. Club gave the episode an "A−" grade and wrote, "The wordless, slow-motion shots of Raylan at the beginning of 'Reckoning' are like a cold splash of water in that respect: We're suddenly reminded that Aunt Helen is not just the brassy, shotgun-toting woman chained to Raylan's father, but the person responsible for Raylan's upbringing, and her death is of real consequence to him. Add to that his part in the chain of events that led to Helen's murder and there's no escaping the guilt and grief that defines much of this first-rate episode."

James Poniewozik of Time wrote, "In a recent Justified post, I noted how the show had developed its cast so well that it can hold my attention even without Raylan Givens. Last night's 'Reckoning' didn't change that opinion — much of it, especially Jeremy Davies' work, only underscored it. But it also emphasized, undeniably, that Timothy Olyphant remains fan-damn-tastic in this role." Alan Sepinwall of HitFix wrote, "This season of Justified has been one long scorpion and the frog parable, as Raylan, Boyd, Mags and so many others have tried and failed to change their natures, dragging a variety of frogs down with them. And by the end of the fantastic 'Reckoning', many of the major players have accepted who and what they are."

Todd VanDerWerff of Los Angeles Times wrote, "In the generally terrific episode 'Reckoning', a stellar penultimate hour for what's been a wonderful second season of Justified, not a single gun goes off." Dan Forcella of TV Fanatic gave the episode a perfect 5 star rating out of 5 and wrote, "'Reckoning' was another thrilling episode of Justified's stellar second season. With the little bit we saw of Loretta, she must have a big role in next week's finale. There is no reason to continue to come back to her if she's isn't going to be a factor in the future."
