= The Moonshine War (Justified) =

- Justified episode
- Episode no.: Season 2 Episode 1
- Directed by: Adam Arkin
- Story by: Elmore Leonard & Graham Yost
- Teleplay by: Graham Yost
- Cinematography by: Francis Kenny
- Editing by: Bill Johnson
- Original air date: February 9, 2011
- Running time: 46 minutes

Guest appearances
- Margo Martindale as Mags Bennett; Jeremy Davies as Dickie Bennett; Alexandra Barreto as Pilar; Jordi Caballero as Gio Reyes; Matt Craven as Dan Grant; Kaitlyn Dever as Loretta McCready; Brad William Henke as Coover Bennett; Chris Mulkey as Walt McCready; Joseph Lyle Taylor as Doyle Bennett; Billy Miller as James Earl Dean; Peter Murnik as Deputy Tom Bergen

Episode chronology
← Previous "Bulletville"	Next → "The Life Inside"
- Justified (season 2)

"The Moonshine War" is the first episode of the second season of the American Neo-Western television series Justified. It is the 14th overall episode of the series and was written by series developer Graham Yost from a story by Yost and executive producer Elmore Leonard and directed by Adam Arkin. It originally aired on FX on February 9, 2011.

The series is based on Elmore Leonard's stories about the character Raylan Givens, particularly "Fire in the Hole", which serves as the basis for the episode. The series follows Raylan Givens, a tough deputy U.S. Marshal enforcing his own brand of justice. Following the shooting of a mob hitman, Raylan is sent to Lexington, Kentucky to investigate an old childhood friend Boyd Crowder, who is now part of a white supremacist gang. In the episode, after fixing all loose ends with the Miami mob, Raylan works with Rachel on a case involving a sex offender who is connected to a powerful crime family in the area.

According to Nielsen Media Research, the episode was seen by an estimated 3.47 million household viewers and gained a 1.3/4 ratings share among adults aged 18–49. The episode received very positive reviews, with critics welcoming the new characters, highlighting Margo Martindale and Jeremy Davies as standouts.

== Plot ==
In the aftermath of the cabin shootout, Mullen (Nick Searcy) and his officials take Ava (Joelle Carter) into custody while there appears to be no sign of Raylan (Timothy Olyphant) or Boyd (Walton Goggins). The last gunrunner alive, Pilar (Alexandra Barreto), forces a truck driver to get her to the airport to escape. In the landing zone, she is confronted by Boyd, who intends to kill her. Raylan arrives and incapacitates Boyd and takes Pilar to get to Miami in the airplane.

In Miami, Raylan confronts drug kingpin Gio Reyes (Jordi Caballero) and threatens to kill him unless he steps back. Just then, Raylan's boss, Dan Grant (Matt Craven) appears. To Raylan's surprise, Grant tells Reyes that if he harms Raylan, Grant himself will kill Reyes. Reyes is forced to accept the deal. Afterwards, Dan offers Raylan his old job in Miami back, but Raylan returns to Kentucky, where he learns that Boyd has fled the hospital where he was being treated. Raylan is then questioned for the recent events involving Arlo and Bo but he feigns ignorance in the case. After being cleared, he goes on a case with Rachel (Erica Tazel): James Earl Dean (Billy Miller) is a recently paroled sex offender and is suspected of having aggravated a teenager named Loretta McCready (Kaitlyn Dever).

Dean meets with Loretta in a shed where she works on a marijuana crop. She escapes his advances and her recently widowed father Walt (Chris Mulkey) calls the police. However, when the police, Raylan and Rachel question him, Walt feigns not recognizing him and shuts the door. It's revealed that Dean works for the Bennett Clan, a ruthless criminal organization in the area. Two Bennetts, Dickie (Jeremy Davies) and Doyle (Joseph Lyle Taylor) visit Walt for putting marijuana in their land and force him to put his foot on a bear trap. Meanwhile, Loretta talks with the Bennett family matriarch, Mags (Margo Martindale), who works at a grocery store. Mags promises to take care of Dean. Raylan and Rachel arrive at the store and it's revealed that Raylan and Mags have known each other for years. Mags denies hiring Dean to work for them.

Raylan and Rachel talk with Dickie and his brother Coover (Brad William Henke). Coover turns hostile, throwing a dead rat at their car, insulting Rachel with a racial slur and holding a gun in his hand. Dickie orders him to stop and Coover goes back inside. As Loretta tends to the sleeping Walt's injury, Dean kidnaps her, puts her in the trunk of his car and tries to escape to Tennessee. However, Raylan and Rachel intercept him at a gas station and save Loretta, and Dean is arrested. Mags and Dickie later visit Walt, where they poison him with moonshine in retaliation for involving the police with one of their employees, growing marijuana on their land, and neglecting Loretta since his wife's death. Mags promises to raise Loretta better than he has been as he dies.

Back at his hotel room, Raylan is visited by Winona (Natalie Zea). He wants to talk about their previous sexual encounter but they end up sleeping together again. Afterwards, Raylan receives a call from Deputy Tom Bergen (Peter Murnik), who may have found a lead on Boyd. Boyd is then shown with a team exploding in a mine.

== Production ==
=== Casting ===
Starting with this episode, Walton Goggins is promoted to series regular after having a recurring role in the first season as Boyd Crowder.

In October 2010, Jeremy Davies was cast as Dickie Bennett, "in a heavily recurring role as a nemesis to Timothy Olyphant's U.S. Marshal Raylan Givens." In December 2010, Margo Martindale joined as Mags Bennett, "the matriarch of the Bennett clan, a menacing presence in the Harlan County criminal world."

== Reception ==
=== Viewers ===
In its original American broadcast, "The Moonshine War" was seen by an estimated 3.47 million household viewers and gained a 1.3/4 ratings share among adults aged 18–49, according to Nielsen Media Research. This means that 1.3 percent of all households with televisions watched the episode, while 4 percent of all households watching television at that time watched it. This was a 70% increase in viewership from the previous episode, which was watched by 2.03 million viewers with a 0.8/2 in the 18-49 demographics. But it was a 17% decrease in viewership from the previous season premiere, which was watched by 4.16 million viewers with a 1.5 in the 18-49 demographics.

=== Critical reviews ===
"The Moonshine War" received very positive reviews from critics. Seth Amitin of IGN gave the episode a "great" 8 out of 10 rating and wrote, "'The Moonshine War' seems to be a modest step toward that goal. It's unassuming, quaint, Kentucky Fried Storytelling hits on all cylinders. Whether or not the show continues on that path or jumps around to episodic plots is the real question, but we'll find out as we keep watching."

Alan Sepinwall of HitFix wrote, "The complaints about the early part of Justified season one had less to do with execution than ambition. A number of those standalone episodes were quite good, but in reading your comments there was often a sense of, 'Is that really all they're going to do?' By the time we met Arlo, Boyd and Bo got out of prison, etc., the series became more complicated and simply richer than those early episodes, and it seems like Graham Yost and company have learned that lesson well. 'The Moonshine War' did not lack for ambition."

Emily VanDerWerff of Los Angeles Times wrote, "It had the weird sense of cleaving the episode into two episodes, and while both of those episodes were good, I might have liked it if the whole hour had just dealt with the primary storyline. Still, it's a small quibble in a remarkably self-assured start to season two of the series. I can't wait to see what other evils are hiding in the back woods of Harlan." Scott Von Doviak of Slant Magazine gave the episode a 3.5 star rating out of 4 and wrote, "Justified's rich vein of gallows humor, convincing sense of place, and twisty hillbilly-noir narratives are all selling points, but it's Olyphant's devilish grin that seals the deal." Tim Goodman of The Hollywood Reporter wrote, "The series, which had a string of stand-alone episodes before becoming more serialized, gets the balance a little better in Season 2. But all anyone really needs to know is that Raylan still has a gun, Boyd is still in town, and Mags Bennett ain't as sweet as she looks. Kentucky looks to be one volatile place this season."

Scott Tobias of The A.V. Club gave the episode a "B" grade and wrote, "For the most part, 'The Moonshine War' gets us off to a hell of a promising start, though it has a little clean-up to do before setting the table. If you'll recall, last season ended in a bloody Old West-style shootout, with temporary allies Raylan and Boyd on one side and enforcers from a Miami drug cartel on the other. When all the smoke cleared, Boyd's duplicitous father, Bo, and one of the enforcers were shot dead, but some loose ends were left untied — namely, a stray Miami gunwoman who made her escape and some uncertainty about whether Raylan and Boyd were still maintaining their fragile alliance. Structurally, this causes problems for the first episode, which plays like 15 minutes of finale wrap-up grafted onto 30 minutes of distinctly new material, but at least the i's are dotted and the t's crossed."

Dan Forcella of TV Fanatic gave the episode a 4.5 star rating out of 5 and wrote, "Was I then upset that Boyd was missing from about 90% of this second season premiere? Not at all. The writers eloquently gave us a taste of that ever so fantastic Raylan/Boyd dynamic, and then sidelined it to introduce what I assume will be the main crux of season two: The Bennetts."
