= Full Commitment =

- Justified episode
- Episode no.: Season 2 Episode 11
- Directed by: Peter Werner
- Written by: Benjamin Cavell
- Cinematography by: Francis Kenny
- Editing by: Keith Henderson
- Original air date: April 20, 2011
- Running time: 37 minutes

Guest appearances
- Margo Martindale as Mags Bennett; Jeremy Davies as Dickie Bennett; Jere Burns as Wynn Duffy; Matt Craven as Dan Grant; Linda Gehringer as Helen Givens; Mickey Jones as Rodney "Hot Rod" Dunham; David Meunier as Johnny Crowder; William Ragsdale as Gary Hawkins; Kevin Rankin as Derek "Devil" Lennox; Richard Speight Jr. as Jed Berwind; Joseph Lyle Taylor as Doyle Bennett; Raymond J. Barry as Arlo Givens

Episode chronology
← Previous "Debts and Accounts"	Next → "Reckoning"
- Justified (season 2)

"Full Commitment" is the eleventh episode of the second season of the American Neo-Western television series Justified. It is the 24th overall episode of the series and was written by story editor Benjamin Cavell and directed by Peter Werner. It originally aired on FX on April 20, 2011.

The series is based on Elmore Leonard's stories about the character Raylan Givens, particularly "Fire in the Hole", which serves as the basis for the episode. The series follows Raylan Givens, a tough deputy U.S. Marshal enforcing his own brand of justice. Following the shooting of a mob hitman, Raylan is sent to Lexington, Kentucky to investigate an old childhood friend Boyd Crowder, who is now part of a white supremacist gang. In the episode, Raylan intends to find the hitmen that went after him and Winona on the previous episode, which could impact Gary's life. Meanwhile, Boyd starts his new criminal gang and decides to go after Dickie.

According to Nielsen Media Research, the episode was seen by an estimated 2.50 million household viewers and gained a 0.9/2 ratings share among adults aged 18–49. The episode received very positive reviews from critics, who praised the writing, acting and "shocking" ending.

== Plot ==
In the aftermath of the shooting, Gary (William Ragsdale) arrives at the Marshal's office, yelling at Raylan (Timothy Olyphant) for putting Winona (Natalie Zea) in danger. Mullen (Nick Searcy) stops the argument and has Rachel (Erica Tazel) escort Winona and Gary to their house while he assigns Tim (Jacob Pitts) to watch over Raylan, telling Raylan not to investigate the hitmen.

Dickie (Jeremy Davies) starts training men to use weapons, although they are still lacking experience. Meanwhile, Boyd (Walton Goggins) wakes up next to Ava (Joelle Carter) after having sex with her the night before. Ava accepts his continued criminal activity on the condition that he doesn't oversee prostitution. Boyd and Johnny (David Meunier) approach Arlo (Raymond J. Barry) about starting a partnership through the land's routes, which interests Arlo. Boyd and the gang (with all but Boyd using ski masks) then steal Dickie's marijuana, impacting his business and causing two of Dickie's henchmen to quit. An enraged Dickie then kills the men, only letting Jed (Richard Speight Jr.) alive as he is forced to be part of Dickie's gang. Dickie deduces that Arlo was one of the robbers due to his limp.

Raylan manages to con Tim into losing track of him and visits Mags (Margo Martindale) at her grocery store. Mags explains that despite knowing Raylan killed Coover, she didn't send the hitmen as she intends to keep peace with Helen (Linda Gehringer). Tim catches up to Raylan and then they are surrounded by Doyle (Joseph Lyle Taylor) and his cops, leading to a tense conversation before they are allowed to go. They go to Winona's and Gary's house where Rachel and Tim intend to stay due to Mullen's orders. Raylan notices a man watching from a car and confronts him; the man reveals that he works for a construction company named Baxter-Hawley.

After checking the company's records with Dan Grant's (Matt Craven) help, Raylan confronts Gary as he called the hit on them out of jealousy. He then forces Gary to talk to Wynn Duffy (Jere Burns) and they agree to meet at a location. Raylan accompanies Gary to meet with Duffy, who confesses to his involvement. Raylan tells Gary that he should flee Harlan after all these events and pardons Duffy's actions, but warns him he will kill him if he tries anything again. That night, Helen awakes in the middle of the night due to noises in the house. She goes to the kitchen and finds Dickie and his gang breaking in, demanding that Arlo returns everything he stole. They all reach for their guns and two gunshots and a cry from Helen are heard.

== Reception ==
=== Viewers ===
In its original American broadcast, "Full Commitment" was seen by an estimated 2.50 million household viewers and gained a 0.9/2 ratings share among adults aged 18–49, according to Nielsen Media Research. This means that 0.9 percent of all households with televisions watched the episode, while 2 percent of all households watching television at that time watched it. This was steady in viewership from the previous episode, which was watched by 2.50 million viewers with a 0.9/2 in the 18-49 demographics.

=== Critical reviews ===
"Full Commitment" received very positive reviews from critics. Scott Tobias of The A.V. Club gave the episode an "A−" grade and wrote, "If you're looking for a key scene in 'Full Commitment,' a tense yet subtler-than-usual episode of Justified, it's in the little exchange between Helen and Ava as their men are negotiating on the front porch."

Alan Sepinwall of HitFix wrote, "And regardless of what went down in the kitchen of Raylan's childhood home, I imagine things are going to get much worse before they get better for Boyd, Arlo, Dickie and – much as he's going to hate being dragged back into all of this, particularly at such a perilous professional time – Raylan." Todd VanDerWerff of Los Angeles Times wrote, "I was worried a few weeks ago about how Justified would head into its final episodes after closing off so much of its story line back in the ninth episode. But 'Full Commitment' shows in the best way possible that this season hasn't just been about Raylan versus the Bennetts or Raylan versus Boyd or anything like that."

Dan Forcella of TV Fanatic gave the episode a 4.5 star rating out of 5 and wrote, "The first season of Justified was really about how terrific Timothy Olyphant was as Deputy Marshal Raylan Givens. Conversely, this second season really has been about how great everyone around Olyphant has been. Whether it was Margo Martindale's Mags, Walton Goggins' Boyd, or even Nick Searcy's Art in that one episode, the supporting cast has been fantastic this year. In 'Full Commitment' it was Jeremy Davies turn to shine, as his Dickie Bennett truly did fully commit to his goal of being in charge in Harlan County, and Davies himself fully committed to the role of an absolute sociopath."
