= Cottonmouth (Justified) =

- Justified episode
- Episode no.: Season 2 Episode 5
- Directed by: Michael Watkins
- Written by: Taylor Elmore
- Cinematography by: Francis Kenny
- Editing by: Keith Henderson
- Original air date: March 9, 2011
- Running time: 39 minutes

Guest appearances
- Margo Martindale as Mags Bennett; Jeremy Davies as Dickie Bennett; Jim Beaver as Shelby Parlow; Kaitlyn Dever as Loretta McCready; Linda Gehringer as Helen Givens; Brad William Henke as Coover Bennett; Damon Herriman as Dewey Crowe; Michael Mosley as Kyle Easterly; Peter Murnik as Deputy Tom Bergen; Joseph Lyle Taylor as Doyle Bennett; Michael Shamus Wiles as Winston Baines; Alex Solowitz as Marcus; Nathan Sutton as Pruitt; Raymond J. Barry as Arlo Givens

Episode chronology
← Previous "For Blood or Money"	Next → "Blaze of Glory"
- Justified (season 2)

"Cottonmouth" is the fifth episode of the second season of the American Neo-Western television series Justified. It is the 18th overall episode of the series and was written by co-producer Taylor Elmore and directed by Michael Watkins. It originally aired on FX on March 9, 2011.

The series is based on Elmore Leonard's stories about the character Raylan Givens, particularly "Fire in the Hole", which serves as the basis for the episode. The series follows Raylan Givens, a tough deputy U.S. Marshal enforcing his own brand of justice. Following the shooting of a mob hitman, Raylan is sent to Lexington, Kentucky to investigate an old childhood friend Boyd Crowder, who is now part of a white supremacist gang. In the episode, Raylan receives a tip about a possible connection between the Bennetts and Walt McCready's whereabouts. Meanwhile, Boyd and his team start working on a new robbery. Despite being credited, Jacob Pitts, Erica Tazel and Natalie Zea do not appear in the episode.

According to Nielsen Media Research, the episode was seen by an estimated 2.71 million household viewers and gained a 1.0/3 ratings share among adults aged 18–49. The episode received highly positive reviews from critics, who praised the writing, pace and performances with Margo Martindale and Walton Goggins singled out for praise.

== Plot ==
At prison, Dewey (Damon Herriman) is questioned by Raylan (Timothy Olyphant), who promises to take him to a halfway house in exchange for any useful information regarding the Bennetts. Dewey states that Doyle (Joseph Lyle Taylor) is corrupt and that the Bennetts are planning "something big" and they may be involved on Walt McCready's whereabouts.

At the Marshal's office, Raylan is informed that Arlo (Raymond J. Barry) crossed the threshold of his house arrest. He is then surprised to see Arlo entering the office, giving him the money he owed them, although instead of $20,000, it's just $6,000. To lower the debt, Arlo states that Bowman Crowder was involved in forged checks. Boyd (Walton Goggins) agrees to work with Kyle (Michael Mosley) on a robbery even though their plan involves killing the foreman at their mine job. Boyd then answers the house phone, though he secretly leaves behind his cellphone to listen to Kyle confessing that they will kill Boyd during the robbery.

Their meeting is interrupted when Raylan arrives, who wants Boyd to answer anything about Bowman's activities. Boyd redirects him to Bowman's contact, Winston Baines (Michael Shamus Wiles). Raylan talks with Winston but both get into a fight in which both are hit by tasers. Raylan then questions Coover (Brad William Henke) about Walt's whereabouts and Coover starts getting suspicious of Raylan's intentions. Coover and Dickie (Jeremy Davies) then go to Winston's church but find it empty and are forced to leave when they see Raylan watching them. Raylan talks with Deputy Tom Bergen (Peter Murnik) and both share the theory: that Walt just vanished and the Bennetts are involved.

At the mine, Boyd, Kyle and their team start the robbery by holding the foreman Shelby (Jim Beaver) hostage and stealing explosives and the money from his vault. Kyle's phone starts ringing and Boyd starts accusing him of trying to get them killed. Unknown to them, Boyd left a note to Ava (Joelle Carter) to call the cellphone at that exact hour. Boyd takes Shelby to the mine to set off the explosives while Kyle uses batteries to prepare the detonation, intending to kill them. He activates the explosives but Boyd planted them at their car and Kyle and his team die from the explosion. Boyd and Shelby then leave the mine and Boyd kills the last one of the team standing. Grateful for saving him, Shelby agrees to protect Boyd from the police by providing an alibi.

Returning home, Boyd is confronted by Ava for the note and his actions. He reaffirms she wasn't involved in the crew's deaths and that he can't change who he was. He then gives part of the money (around $20,000) to help Ava's situation. As police cruisers arrive at the house, Boyd asks Ava for one last favor. Mags (Margo Martindale) confronts Dickie and Coover for cashing Walt's checks and attracting the attention of the authorities. She then smashes Coover's fingers with a hammer as punishment for their actions. Raylan meets Loretta (Kaitlyn Dever) at a gas station and gives her a burner phone, telling her to call him if she is in trouble.

== Reception ==
=== Viewers ===
In its original American broadcast, "Cottonmouth" was seen by an estimated 2.71 million household viewers and gained a 1.0/3 ratings share among adults aged 18–49, according to Nielsen Media Research. This means that 1 percent of all households with televisions watched the episode, while 3 percent of all households watching television at that time watched it. This was a slight increase in viewership from the previous episode, which was watched by 2.64 million viewers with a 1.0/3 in the 18-49 demographics.

=== Critical reviews ===
"Cottonmouth" received highly positive reviews from critics. Scott Tobias of The A.V. Club gave the episode an "A" grade and wrote, "There's so much electrifying stuff in 'Cottonmouth' it's hard to know where to start: the tender scene between Raylan and Loretta, where he quietly offers her protection from a danger he can see coming; Boyd's 'Always Be Cool' demeanor and his delicious counterplotting in the mine heist; Raylan's Taser fight with the reverend of the Church of the Two-Stroke Jesus; the staggering scene where Mags punishes Coover for getting out of line and the big man is reduced to a helpless, sniveling 6-year-old, pleading for his mother's mercy. And that's to say nothing of the colorful Elmore Leonard-esque vernacular that the show's writers imitate so skillfully. Justified has finally hit full stride this season, and it's a wonderful thing."

Alan Sepinwall of HitFix wrote, "Great work all around. I was enjoying the episodes previous to this one, but 'Cottonmouth' was a reminder of how much stronger Justified is when it sets the standalone stuff aside for a while."

Dan Forcella of TV Fanatic gave the episode a 4.5 star rating out of 5 and wrote, "What was great about that entire plot was that it was so similar to a typical Justified/Elmore Leonard bad guy story. We got to watch the criminals do their thing and eventually start fighting with each other until they screw the pooch. That's when Raylan came in and saved the day."
