= The Spoil =

- Justified episode
- Episode no.: Season 2 Episode 8
- Directed by: Michael Watkins
- Story by: Elmore Leonard & Dave Andron
- Teleplay by: Dave Andron
- Cinematography by: Francis Kenny
- Editing by: Keith Henderson
- Original air date: March 30, 2011
- Running time: 41 minutes

Guest appearances
- Rebecca Creskoff as Carol Johnson; Margo Martindale as Mags Bennett; Jeremy Davies as Dickie Bennett; Tara Buck as Sally Peener; Kaitlyn Dever as Loretta McCready; Linda Gehringer as Helen Givens; Brad William Henke as Coover Bennett; Peter Murnik as Deputy Tom Bergen; Joseph Lyle Taylor as Doyle Bennett; Raymond J. Barry as Arlo Givens

Episode chronology
← Previous "Save My Love"	Next → "Brother's Keeper"
- Justified (season 2)

"The Spoil" is the eighth episode of the second season of the American Neo-Western television series Justified. It is the 21st overall episode of the series and was written by supervising producer Dave Andron from a story by Andron and executive producer Elmore Leonard and directed by Michael Watkins. It originally aired on FX on March 30, 2011.

The series is based on Elmore Leonard's stories about the character Raylan Givens, particularly "Fire in the Hole", which serves as the basis for the episode. The series follows Raylan Givens, a tough deputy U.S. Marshal enforcing his brand of justice. Following the shooting of a mob hitman, Raylan is sent to Lexington, Kentucky to investigate an old childhood friend Boyd Crowder, who is now part of a white supremacist gang. In the episode, Raylan is assigned to protect Carol Johnson while she attempts to convince Harlan County residents to sell their land rights over to Black Pike. Despite being credited, Jacob Pitts does not appear in the episode.

According to Nielsen Media Research, the episode was seen by an estimated 2.64 million household viewers and gained a 0.9/2 ratings share among adults aged 18–49. The episode received highly positive reviews from critics, who praised the writing, pace, acting and build-up for the next episode.

== Plot ==
Dickie (Jeremy Davies) and Coover (Brad William Henke) visit a land owner, intending to buy it for their family. However, Boyd (Walton Goggins) was already there as Black Pike intends to buy the land. The Bennetts threaten the owner before leaving and Boyd offers him protection from them. The next day, Boyd is stopped by officers on Doyle's (Joseph Lyle Taylor) payroll when they break his car's red lights and they arrest him.

Mullen (Nick Searcy) assigns Raylan (Timothy Olyphant) to protect Carol Johnson (Rebecca Creskoff) and take her to a town meeting in Harlan. Raylan begins suspecting that Mullen knows about the incident in the courthouse. Raylan accompanies Carol to bail out Boyd and they run into Doyle, where both he and Carol get into a heated discussion. Due to the land owner's signature taken over by the police, Carol assigns Boyd to get the signature again. Carol and Raylan then visit Mags (Margo Martindale) at her grocery store, who opposes Black Pike's ownership of the land. Dickie and Coover also arrive and Raylan and Coover get into a heated discussion. Despite Dickie's insistence to calm down, they both get into a brutal fight in which Coover brutally punches Raylan in the face until he is stopped by Mags.

Raylan explains to Carol about his family feud with the Bennetts: it was suspected that the Givens family informed about the Bennett's activities during the Prohibition era, which resulted in Raylan's uncle's death. Dickie's limping condition is a result of a baseball game where Raylan hit him in the knee after Dickie tried to hit him in the head. Boyd meets with Arlo (Raymond J. Barry) and Helen (Linda Gehringer), wanting them to sell their land but Arlo refuses. Raylan, Carol and Boyd then attend a church meeting to talk about Black Pike's business prospects, where Raylan and Boyd take different instances on the company's plans. But Mags wins over the crowd by highlighting the company's shady actions and invites everyone to a party at her house.

The meeting suddenly ends when gunshots are heard, although is finally discovered to be just firecrackers planted by Carol. Boyd is attacked when he returns home by Dickie and Coover, who intend to release an unknown animal on the home. However, Ava (Joelle Carter) appears, kills the animal and forces them to leave their house. Raylan and Carol visit Arlo and Helen to buy the land, where Helen tells Raylan she will give him the $20,000 that Arlo stole from authorities if Raylan leaves Harlan and the Bennetts behind. Suddenly, gunshots are fired and everyone enters the house but Arlo is shot in the leg.

Due to the house's lack of phone lines, Raylan removes Arlo's monitor ankle to alert the police. Raylan then heads out and locates the shooter: Sally Peener (Tara Buck), sister of the man responsible for the courthouse's bomb attempt. After handing the shooter to the police, he tells them to warn Judge Reardon about a possible assassination attempt. The bomber is eventually found outside the Judge's house and is arrested. Arlo is taken by ambulances while Helen gives Raylan an envelope with the $20,000. Despite their agreement, Raylan and Carol leave to attend Mags' party.

== Production ==
=== Writing ===
There was interest among critics and fans about the content of the Bennett's duffel bag, as the animal's identity was never revealed in the episode. Graham Yost said the writers viewed the animal as a badger, saying "We debated it: Was it too Coen brothers? Or was it just Coen brothers enough? Honestly, it was like I was the vice president and it was the senate: Half the room said, 'No way,' and the other half said, 'Oh come on, let’s do it.' And I said, 'Okay, let's do it.' It ended up being great."

== Reception ==
=== Viewers ===
In its original American broadcast, "The Spoil" was seen by an estimated 2.64 million household viewers and gained a 0.9/2 ratings share among adults aged 18–49, according to Nielsen Media Research. This means that 0.9 percent of all households with televisions watched the episode, while 2 percent of all households watching television at that time watched it. This was a 18% increase in viewership from the previous episode, which was watched by 2.22 million viewers with a 0.7/2 in the 18-49 demographics.

=== Critical reviews ===
"The Spoil" received highly positive reviews from critics. Scott Tobias of The A.V. Club gave the episode an "A−" grade and wrote, "Picking up the momentum from last week's episode, 'The Spoil' feels like part one of an unofficial two-parter, just as the recent 'Blaze Of Glory' and 'Save My Love' played in consecutive weeks, but it accomplishes more than mere table-setting. I'll wait a bit to talk about the episode's extraordinary centerpiece but I think we're seeing a great convergence of all the dark forces this show has to offer."

Alan Sepinwall of HitFix wrote, "But all the players are on the board together now, and we know most of the battles – even getting confirmation that it was Raylan who hobbled Dickie, and why – and that was a damned entertaining hour of Justified."

Dan Forcella of TV Fanatic gave the episode a perfect 5 star rating out of 5 and wrote, "Justified continued its stellar run of serialization this week. In 'The Spoil', Raylan followed along as the battle between Black Pike and the Bennetts came to the forefront. The main attraction was the town hall meeting in which Mags Bennett proved why the people of Bennett love her so much, but getting to that moment was just as entertaining."
