= The I of the Storm =

- Justified episode
- Episode no.: Season 2 Episode 3
- Directed by: Peter Werner
- Written by: Dave Andron
- Cinematography by: Francis Kenny
- Editing by: Victor Du Bois
- Original air date: February 23, 2011
- Running time: 40 minutes

Guest appearances
- Jeremy Davies as Dickie Bennett; Will Harris as Elrod; Brad William Henke as Coover Bennett; Damon Herriman as Dewey Crowe; Michael Mosley as Kyle Easterly; Peter Murnik as Deputy Tom Bergen; Channon Roe as Cutter; Joseph Lyle Taylor as Doyle Bennett; Dave Alvin as himself

Episode chronology
| ← Previous "The Life Inside" | Next → "For Blood or Money" |
- Justified (season 2)

"The I of the Storm" is the third episode of the second season of the American Neo-Western television series Justified. It is the 16th overall episode of the series and was written by supervising producer Dave Andron and directed by Peter Werner. It originally aired on FX on February 23, 2011.

The series is based on Elmore Leonard's stories about the character Raylan Givens, particularly "Fire in the Hole", which serves as the basis for the episode. The series follows Raylan Givens, a tough deputy U.S. Marshal enforcing his own brand of justice. Following the shooting of a mob hitman, Raylan is sent to Lexington, Kentucky to investigate an old childhood friend Boyd Crowder, who is now part of a white supremacist gang. In the episode, Dewey Crowe returns to Harlan to take advantage of a big score, but a more dangerous element has their eyes on that same prize. Despite being credited, Erica Tazel does not appear in the episode.

According to Nielsen Media Research, the episode was seen by an estimated 2.59 million household viewers and gained a 0.9/3 ratings share among adults aged 18–49. The episode received very positive reviews from critics, who praised the writing and performances (particularly Walton Goggins). Walton Goggins submitted this episode for consideration for his nomination for the Primetime Emmy Award for Outstanding Supporting Actor in a Drama Series at the 63rd Primetime Emmy Awards.

== Plot ==
Dewey Crowe (Damon Herriman) meets with Boyd (Walton Goggins) at a bar. They discuss their new prospects in life. Dewey has to turn down a sex worker due to lack of funds and rejects Boyd's offer of money. At a roadhouse, Raylan (Timothy Olyphant) and Winona (Natalie Zea) attend a Dave Alvin performance, but leave when they see Tim (Jacob Pitts) in the roadhouse, as they're still unsure about taking their relationship public.

Next we see Dewey traveling on a church bus when it is high jacked by gunmen. They kill the man in charge and steal a bag of OxyContin from the dead men. Back at the marshal's office, while discussing the case with Raylan, Mullen (Nick Searcy) shares his concern for Tim after the shootout in the previous episode as Tim seemingly feels no remorse for killing a man. Dewey confronts Boyd about the bus incident, thinking that Boyd is involved but Boyd denies being part of the robbery. Dewey then decides to steal the drugs from the robbers by himself. Raylan asks Ava (Joelle Carter) about Boyd's possible connection to the robbery and she gives him an address to a bar which Boyd frequents. She also tells Raylan that Boyd lives with her to pay the mortgage, as long as he is not involved in anything illegal.

Unable to find a mask, Dewey decides to wear a hat and pretends to be Raylan when he breaks into the house of the robbers. He threatens the robbers to reveal the location of the OxyContin and leaves, telling multiple times he is Raylan. Unknown to Dewey, a woman saw his actions through another room in the house. This woman is a confidential informant for Doyle Bennett (Joseph Lyle Taylor). Because of this, Doyle assumes Raylan is corrupt and awkwardly tries to get Raylan to confess. Rylan learns that the woman identified him as the man who broke into the house. He confronts the woman, who confirms Raylan is not the same person. Raylan eventually deduces that Dewey is involved. He tells Doyle to issue an all-points bulletin on Dewey.

Dewey visits Boyd at the bar, proud of having stolen the drugs. Boyd is disgusted by Dewey's actions and notifies Raylan of Dewey's location. Raylan finds Dewey in an RV with two prostitutes just as the robbers arrive and a shootout ensues. Doyle arrives and questions the robbers about who hired them to steal the drugs in the first place. They reveal that it was Dickie (Jeremy Davies). Doyle kills both robbers in order to silence them. Raylan fails to hear the conversation and assumes the robbers resisted arrest. That night, Doyle confronts Dickie and Coover (Brad William Henke) for their actions, telling them to be more responsible and careful.

Raylan talks with Ava about letting Boyd live with her but she stands firm on her decision, saying Raylan has no say in her life. At a bar, Boyd is joined by a new co-worker Kyle (Michael Mosley), despite Boyd wanting to be left alone. When Kyle confesses that he admires Boyd and that he has even killed people, Boyd is disgusted and leaves the bar. Kyle follows him and tries to talk with him. Boyd loses the temper and puts Kyle in a headlock through the window and starts furiously driving. After mocking him, Boyd drops him on the road. He stops as he sees that the body is not moving. Once Kyle stands up, Boyd drives away screaming.

== Production ==
=== Casting ===
The episode include a guest performance by Dave Alvin, who plays himself at the beginning of the episode. Alvin was a fan of the series and series developer Graham Yost contacted him to appear in the show. Alvin commented, "One of my favorite old TV shows was The Rockford Files. I've discussed this with Yost, and he was a Rockford guy, and I just said at one point before I knew he was a Rockford guy, Justified is like The Rockford Files of Appalachia meets The Sopranos. It's a very smartly written, smartly put-together show."

== Reception ==
=== Viewers ===
In its original American broadcast, "The I of the Storm" was seen by an estimated 2.59 million household viewers and gained a 0.9/3 ratings share among adults aged 18–49, according to Nielsen Media Research. This means that 0.9 percent of all households with televisions watched the episode, while 3 percent of all households watching television at that time watched it. This was a 7% increase in viewership from the previous episode, which was watched by 2.41 million viewers with a 0.9/3 in the 18-49 demographics.

=== Critical reviews ===
"The I of the Storm" received very positive reviews from critics. Scott Tobias of The A.V. Club gave the episode a "B+" grade and wrote,"'The I Of The Storm' makes the thrilling suggestion that the criminal world of Harlan County is wide open this season, and the struggle for power among the young and unscrupulous will be positively Darwinian."

Alan Sepinwall of HitFix wrote, "What a hell of an episode for Walton Goggins, who keeps making Boyd smaller and smaller until the enormous explosion of the final scene. Right now, in the context of this season's larger story about Raylan vs. the Bennetts, Boyd seems like a real wild card."

Dan Forcella of TV Fanatic gave the episode a 4.7 star rating out of 5 and wrote, "It just keeps getting better and better. Even though 'The I Of The Storm' did not contain one scene with Margo Martindale, the second season of Justified continues to impress. 'The I of the Storm' was an entertaining episode, laying a lot of tracks for the longer arc of the season."
