= For Blood or Money =

- Justified episode
- Episode no.: Season 2 Episode 4
- Directed by: John Dahl
- Written by: Wendy Calhoun
- Cinematography by: Francis Kenny
- Editing by: Bill Johnson
- Original air date: March 2, 2011
- Running time: 39 minutes

Guest appearances
- Margo Martindale as Mags Bennett; Jeremy Davies as Dickie Bennett; Chadwick Boseman as Ralph "Flex" Beeman; Kaitlyn Dever as Loretta McCready; Jakobe Dempsey as Nick Moss; Steven Flynn as Emmitt Arnett; Brad William Henke as Coover Bennett; Juanita Jennings as Rachel's Mother; Joel McCrary as Olander; Michael Mosley as Kyle Easterly; William Ragsdale as Gary Hawkins; Joseph Lyle Taylor as Doyle Bennett; Larenz Tate as Clinton Moss

Episode chronology
← Previous "The I of the Storm"	Next → "Cottonmouth"
- Justified (season 2)

"For Blood or Money" is the fourth episode of the second season of the American Neo-Western television series Justified. It is the 17th overall episode of the series and was written by co-producer Wendy Calhoun and directed by John Dahl. It originally aired on FX on March 2, 2011.

The series is based on Elmore Leonard's stories about the character Raylan Givens, particularly "Fire in the Hole", which serves as the basis for the episode. The series follows Raylan Givens, a tough deputy U.S. Marshal enforcing his own brand of justice. Following the shooting of a mob hitman, Raylan is sent to Lexington, Kentucky to investigate an old childhood friend Boyd Crowder, who is now part of a white supremacist gang. In the episode, Rachel's recently paroled brother-in-law is on the run, and Raylan has to make sure Rachel's emotional involvement doesn't affect the case.

According to Nielsen Media Research, the episode was seen by an estimated 2.64 million household viewers and gained a 1.0/3 ratings share among adults aged 18–49. The episode received positive reviews from critics, who praised the character development, emotional tone and performances (especially Erica Tazel).

== Plot ==
Raylan (Timothy Olyphant) visits the Bennett family picnic, asking about anything related to the robbers, as they had Dickie (Jeremy Davies) as one of their contacts. Mags (Margo Martindale) reacts angrily to these accusations, thinking Raylan still has a grudge against them. Raylan leaves, although he tells them that one of the robbers killed a hitman who worked for the Dixie Mafia and they will seek retribution. Kyle (Michael Mosley) visits Boyd (Walton Goggins); despite his injuries, he wants to do business with him.

A paroled criminal, Clinton Moss (Larenz Tate), is living at a halfway house when the manager calls him out for skipping a task and revokes his day out, when he was supposed to attend his a family birthday. In a fit of rage, Clinton attacks and severely wounds the manager before escaping. Despite being wounded, the manager intends to follow Clinton rather than calling the police. Raylan pays a visit to Emmitt Arnett (Steven Flynn), after their previous encounter. Arnett claims not to be involved with any of the robberies or the Dixie Mafia. Winona (Natalie Zea) visits Gary (William Ragsdale), questioning what's her move to win her over. To her surprise, Gary says that in order to win her back, he wants a divorce.

At the office, Raylan learns from Rachel (Erica Tazel) about Clinton, her brother-in-law. Clinton killed Rachel's sister Shawnee in a car accident while driving under the influence, was released on parole and planned to visit his son. Clinton meets with a friend, drug dealer Ralph "Flex" Beeman (Chadwick Boseman), asking for money but Flex refuses. Desperate, Clinton shoots Flex in the hand, kicks him out of the car and drives away. He drives to his son's school but the Marshals are already there and he flees before Raylan can catch him. At the office, Winona tells Raylan about the divorce, as Gary thinks their divorce would help with the house's mortgage. But Raylan says that is a trick for her to stay with him.

Ava (Joelle Carter) talks with Boyd about Kyle's offer but he says he is turning it down, wanting to avoid more crimes. Clinton breaks into Rachel's mother's (Juanita Jennings) house and steals her car. Rachel and Raylan later arrive, and Rachel's mother tells him that on the day of the accident, Clinton was driving Shawnee to the hospital after she overdosed. Clinton waits for his son at a restaurant when the halfway house manager walks in, intending to take Clinton back. But Flex suddenly arrives and threatens Clinton as his car had drugs. The Marshals arrive and kill Flex while Clinton holds the manager hostage. Rachel manages to convince her brother-in-law to drop the gun and Clinton is arrested. Despite being in custody, Rachel allows his son Nick (Jakobe Dempsey) to visit Clinton.

After the events, the team discusses Rachel's family history. After everyone leaves, Rachel breaks down in tears. At the mine, Kyle once again approaches Boyd, who already declined his offer despite a $40,000 payment. Kyle further describes his plan, and says they could even look like heroes afterwards. The latter part interests Boyd.

== Reception ==
=== Viewers ===
In its original American broadcast, "For Blood or Money" was seen by an estimated 2.64 million household viewers and gained a 1.0/3 ratings share among adults aged 18–49, according to Nielsen Media Research. This means that 1 percent of all households with televisions watched the episode, while 3 percent of all households watching television at that time watched it. This was a slight increase in viewership from the previous episode, which was watched by 2.59 million viewers with a 0.9/3 in the 18-49 demographics.

=== Critical reviews ===
"For Blood or Money" received positive reviews from critics. Scott Tobias of The A.V. Club gave the episode a "B" grade and wrote,"I suspect the Bennetts and Boyd will assert themselves more forcefully very soon. If Justified is following the road map of its successful first season — and I think it is, with greater refinement — then a shift should happen right about now, just as it did after the Alan Ruck episode last year. Bring it on."

Alan Sepinwall of HitFix wrote, "'For Blood or Money' has a lot on its plate. It has to keep the Bennett story inching forward, reintroduce the Dixie Mafia baddies who were harassing Gary last season, give us a better sense of Boyd and Ava as roommates (and possibly more?) and also continue his conflict over the proposed robbery, and it has to present a standalone story with a bunch of Elmore Leonard-style hoods (particularly wannabe magician Flex). Mostly, though, it had to deepen the character of Rachel."

Dan Forcella of TV Fanatic gave the episode a 4.5 star rating out of 5 and wrote, "Justified is quickly becoming one of my favorite shows. 'For Blood or Money' helped its cause with a fantastic mix of episodic and serialized stories."
