= The Life Inside =

- Justified episode
- Episode no.: Season 2 Episode 2
- Directed by: Jon Avnet
- Written by: Benjamin Cavell
- Cinematography by: Francis Kenny
- Editing by: Keith Henderson
- Original air date: February 16, 2011
- Running time: 41 minutes

Guest appearances
- Linda Gehringer as Helen Givens; Jeremy Davies as Dickie Bennett; Margo Martindale as Mags Bennett; Kaitlyn Dever as Loretta McCready; Brad William Henke as Coover Bennett; Sarah Jones as Jamie Berglund; James Jordan as Van; Kai Lennox as Glenn Cosgrove; Chris Mulkey as Walt McCready; William Ragsdale as Gary Hawkins; Christie Lynn Smith as Gayle Cosgrove; David Sullivan as Jess Timmons; Joseph Lyle Taylor as Doyle Bennett; Raymond J. Barry as Arlo Givens

Episode chronology
← Previous "The Moonshine War"	Next → "The I of the Storm"
- Justified (season 2)

"The Life Inside" is the second episode of the second season of the American Neo-Western television series Justified. It is the 15th overall episode of the series and was written by story editor Benjamin Cavell and directed by Jon Avnet. It originally aired on FX on February 16, 2011.

The series is based on Elmore Leonard's stories about the character Raylan Givens, particularly "Fire in the Hole", which serves as the basis for the episode. The series follows Raylan Givens, a tough deputy U.S. Marshal enforcing his own brand of justice. Following the shooting of a mob hitman, Raylan is sent to Lexington, Kentucky to investigate an old childhood friend Boyd Crowder, who is now part of a white supremacist gang. In the episode, Raylan and Tim go to transfer a pregnant fugitive to give birth, but end up in the middle of a small-time human trafficking operation. Despite being credited, Erica Tazel does not appear in the episode.

According to Nielsen Media Research, the episode was seen by an estimated 2.41 million household viewers and gained a 0.9/3 ratings share among adults aged 18–49. The episode received positive reviews, although critics expressed disappointment at the short screen time for the Bennett family.

== Plot ==
Dickie (Jeremy Davies) and Coover (Brad William Henke) dispose of Walt's (Chris Mulkey) corpse in a mineshaft. Raylan (Timothy Olyphant) finds that Boyd (Walton Goggins) is now working in a mining site. Over drinks, Boyd claims to have put his criminal life and desire to kill Bo's killer behind him. Raylan then visits Arlo (Raymond J. Barry), who is now under house arrest, to ask him to return the $20,000 the Marshals gave him. Arlo claims he doesn’t have it as he had given it to Bo earlier.

Doyle Bennett drops off Loretta at Mag’s store. Mags (Margo Martindale) plans to look after Loretta (Kaitlyn Dever) after killing her father at the end of the previous episode. She lies to Loretta by telling her that her father has “gone south for a few weeks,” to complete a job for the Bennett clan. Raylan and Tim (Jacob Pitts) are assigned to transport a pregnant inmate, Jamie Berglund (Sarah Jones), from her prison to her doctor’s appointment, as her baby is due to be born in a few weeks. She claims to be pregnant from a conjugal visit from her husband, though she doubts that he will be allowed to have custody of the child after it is born. Jess Timmons (David Sullivan) and Van (James Jordan), get the jump on Raylan and Tim, while at the office, and they take Jamie from them. Jess and Van, both working in human trafficking, plan to perform a C-section on Jamie, who unsuccessfully tries to escape after she realizes that Timmons plans to kill her after the baby is delivered.

Raylan and Tim locate Jamie's husband, who was unaware of her pregnancy and insists that he cannot possibly be the father. They begin suspecting that a prison guard may be the father. They question prison guard Glenn Cosgrove (Kai Lennox) in front of his wife Gayle (Christie Lynn Smith), having obtained evidence that he hired Timmons and Van to kill Jamie and sell the baby to stop his affair from being revealed. They drive to the house where Jamie is being held and where Jess has killed Van after Van attempted to free Jamie. They find Jess holding Jamie behind a couch threatening to kill her and her baby. While Raylan distracts him with conversation, Tim successfully shoots him in the head from a distance.

Boyd returns home after apparently being injured in bar fight. As Ava enters we realize he is staying at her house. Ava (Joelle Carter) helps him tend to his wounds, although the exact nature of their relationship remains undefined for the time being. Back at his office, Raylan is visited by Gayle, who was wondering if it would be possible to adopt Jamie's baby as Gayle is unable to conceive. Raylan tells her he will look at it. He returns to his hotel room, only to be visited by Gary (William Ragsdale). Gary explains to Raylan that he intends to win back Winona (Natalie Zea) after the whole Duffy incident and leaves. Raylan enters the room with a sleeping Winona, not telling her about his encounter with Gary outside. Raylan does not want to share the details of what happened in his day but Winona tells him she wants to know everything, as his silence is the thing that she truly can’t stand. He starts by saying he talked to her husband outside.

== Reception ==
=== Viewers ===
In its original American broadcast, "The Life Inside" was seen by an estimated 2.41 million household viewers and gained a 0.9/3 ratings share among adults aged 18–49, according to Nielsen Media Research. This means that 0.9 percent of all households with televisions watched the episode, while 3 percent of all households watching television at that time watched it. This was a 31% decrease in viewership from the previous episode, which was watched by 3.47 million viewers with a 1.3/4 in the 18-49 demographics.

=== Critical reviews ===
"The Life Inside" received positive reviews from critics. Scott Tobias of The A.V. Club gave the episode a "B+" grade and wrote,"'The Life Inside' finds the show settling into the season, too, but it strikes me as an improvement on all fronts, supporting a satisfying and thematically compelling self-contained A-plot with a lot of intrigue at the margins."

Alan Sepinwall of HitFix wrote, "All in all, a solid follow-up to last week's terrific premiere. Any episode that puts Tim Olyphant in scenes with both Walton Goggins and Raymond Barry is almost automatically good, and this one had plenty beyond that."

Dan Forcella of TV Fanatic gave the episode a 3.5 star rating out of 5 and wrote, "I thought Justified improved greatly throughout its first season, and showed much promise of in last week's premiere, finding the right mixture of episodic storyline and long-term serialization. 'The Life Inside,' however, returned a bit too much to the procedural format I hoped the show had moved on from a while ago."
