= Save My Love (Justified) =

- Justified episode
- Episode no.: Season 2 Episode 7
- Directed by: Jon Avnet
- Written by: Graham Yost
- Cinematography by: Francis Kenny
- Editing by: Bill Johnson
- Original air date: March 23, 2011
- Running time: 41 minutes

Guest appearances
- Stephen Root as Judge Mike Reardon; Jere Burns as Wynn Duffy; William Ragsdale as Gary Hawkins; Tara Buck as Sally Peener; Kara Landry as Mrs. Peener; Rebecca Creskoff as Carol Johnson

Episode chronology
← Previous "Blaze of Glory"	Next → "The Spoil"
- Justified (season 2)

"Save My Love" is the seventh episode of the second season of the American Neo-Western television series Justified. It is the 20th overall episode of the series and was written by series developer Graham Yost and directed by Jon Avnet. It originally aired on FX on March 23, 2011.

The series is based on Elmore Leonard's stories about the character Raylan Givens, particularly "Fire in the Hole", which serves as the basis for the episode. The series follows Raylan Givens, a tough deputy U.S. Marshal enforcing his own brand of justice. Following the shooting of a mob hitman, Raylan is sent to Lexington, Kentucky to investigate an old childhood friend Boyd Crowder, who is now part of a white supremacist gang. In the episode, Winona's involvement with the money in the evidence locker goes deeper than assumed, putting Raylan in a tense race through the courthouse to replace it. Despite being credited, Joelle Carter does not appear in the episode.

According to Nielsen Media Research, the episode was seen by an estimated 2.22 million household viewers and gained a 0.7/2 ratings share among adults aged 18–49. The episode received very positive reviews from critics, who praised the "tense" atmosphere, writing, pace and acting.

== Plot ==
At Raylan's (Timothy Olyphant) hotel room, Winona (Natalie Zea) suddenly remembers something and after checking the $100 bills, realizes that Raylan didn't get the one she stole. Raylan then leaves in order to find the bill. Meanwhile, Gary (William Ragsdale) meets with Wynn Duffy (Jere Burns) for a business partnership.

At the mine, Boyd (Walton Goggins) is approached by Carol Johnson (Rebecca Creskoff), Executive Vice President of Black Pike Coal, a mining company. Carol is impressed by Boyd's actions during the robbery and offers him a spot in the company's security team. Boyd hesitates but agrees to go with Carol on a limo trip. After some consideration, Boyd decides to accept Carol's offer as she is interested in his criminal life.

In the office, Raylan sees that the FBI is also investigating the robbery from the previous episode. He retrieves the evidence from Tim (Jacob Pitts), who got it first. He finds the $100 bill and removes it, replacing it with an original bill. However, Raylan finds that Tim already scanned the bills and sent them to the FBI. He talks about this to Winona, who confesses that she took all the money from evidence and took the $100 bill to the bank for counterfeit questions when the robbery started. Despite not wanting him to be part of returning it, Raylan decides to help her return the money to the courthouse.

Raylan helps her infiltrate the duffel bag with money to the courthouse but Winona is summoned by Judge Reardon (Stephen Root) as he needs her as stenographer. Reardon also asks Raylan to check the courthouse for any bomb threat. At the court, Raylan finds Boyd and Carol, who are part of the trial. After having finished working, Winona goes to the evidence room, only to find it locked. Their meeting is then interrupted by Reardon, who needs Winona back as stenographer on the trial, and Rachel (Erica Tazel), who needs Raylan to return to work. Reardon has an assistant take Winona's duffel bag to her office, thinking is her gym clothes. To complicate matters, Rachel tells Raylan that the Secret Service got involved in the case due to the $100 bill.

The team has found out that the bill was part of a robbery committed twenty years ago. They check the evidence room for the case and discover the money has been missing. Before Raylan and Winona can return it, the courthouse is evacuated due to a bomb threat. Raylan deduces that the plaintiff at the trial and the authorities arrest them, finding that the bomb threat was a sniper. The bomb squad is ordered to leave just when an officer was about to check Winona's duffel bag.

For his role in the courthouse, Carol decides to give Boyd a new mission: the Bennetts, who have been a problem for her business. Back at the courthouse, Raylan allows Winona to enter the evidence room and put the duffel bag back. Mullen (Nick Searcy) shows up but does not see Winona putting the money. The episode ends as Raylan and Winona riding the elevator in silence.

== Reception ==
=== Viewers ===
In its original American broadcast, "Save My Love" was seen by an estimated 2.22 million household viewers and gained a 0.7/2 ratings share among adults aged 18–49, according to Nielsen Media Research. This means that 0.7 percent of all households with televisions watched the episode, while 2 percent of all households watching television at that time watched it. This was a 7% decrease in viewership from the previous episode, which was watched by 2.37 million viewers with a 0.8/2 in the 18-49 demographics.

=== Critical reviews ===
"Save My Love" received very positive reviews from critics. Scott Tobias of The A.V. Club gave the episode an "A" grade and wrote, "In all, 'Save My Love' felt like the back-half of an unofficial two-parter, throwing us right into Winona's sticky situation and amping up the suspense from there. And none of tonight's thriller payoffs would have been possible without the set-up of last week's episode, which I now confess to have underrated. Such are the hazards of the trade: Apologies in advance for doing it again in the near future. It's inevitable."

Alan Sepinwall of HitFix wrote, "But damn if I wasn't hooked throughout 'Save My Love,' an extremely tense – and at times darkly comic – hour demonstrating the many different ways the world had of letting Raylan and Winona know it wasn't going to be easy to put that money back." Todd VanDerWerff of Los Angeles Times wrote, "The latest episode of Justified, 'Save My Love,' is an expert example of how to build tension in an hour of television. Immensely entertaining and filled with all sorts of incredible twists and turns, the episode shows off just how adroit Justified has become about backing its characters into corners and seeing if they can figure a way out of their predicaments. A sure sign of cracking good drama is when it seems like the writers are as much at a loss as the characters about what to do - yet they keep piling on the problems because that's likely what would happen if it were a real-life situation. Justified is heightened, yes, but in 'Save My Love,' everything feels terrifyingly real, terrifyingly tense."

Dan Forcella of TV Fanatic gave the episode a 4.5 star rating out of 5 and wrote, "'Save My Love' picked up right where 'Blaze of Glory' left off, with Raylan attempting to keep Winona out of trouble for stealing money out of the evidence locker. And what made it so interesting, other than the constant suspense of whether Winona would end up getting caught, was how much Raylan was struggling with the entire situation."
