= Blaze of Glory (Justified) =

- Justified episode
- Episode no.: Season 2 Episode 6
- Directed by: Jon Avnet
- Written by: Benjamin Cavell
- Cinematography by: Francis Kenny
- Editing by: Victor Du Bois
- Original air date: March 16, 2011
- Running time: 38 minutes

Guest appearances
- William Ragsdale as Gary Hawkins; Ronnie Gene Blevins as Carter Hayes; Chris Coy as Bobby Green; Conor O'Farrell as ATF Agent Keaton; Connie Ray as Mrs. Reasoner; Scott Wilson as Frank Reasoner

Episode chronology
← Previous "Cottonmouth"	Next → "Save My Love"
- Justified (season 2)

"Blaze of Glory" is the sixth episode of the second season of the American Neo-Western television series Justified. It is the 19th overall episode of the series and was written by story editor Benjamin Cavell and directed by Jon Avnet. It originally aired on FX on March 16, 2011.

The series is based on Elmore Leonard's stories about the character Raylan Givens, particularly "Fire in the Hole", which serves as the basis for the episode. The series follows Raylan Givens, a tough deputy U.S. Marshal enforcing his own brand of justice. Following the shooting of a mob hitman, Raylan is sent to Lexington, Kentucky to investigate an old childhood friend Boyd Crowder, who is now part of a white supremacist gang. In the episode, a bank robbery further complicates the relationship between Winona and Raylan, as well as placing her in potential legal trouble.

According to Nielsen Media Research, the episode was seen by an estimated 2.37 million household viewers and gained a 0.8/2 ratings share among adults aged 18–49. The episode received positive reviews from critics, who particularly enjoyed the case despite the intensity of the previous episode and fewer screen time for Boyd and Ava although some questioned Winona's actions in the episode.

== Plot ==
At the Marshal's office, ATF agents separately interrogate Boyd (Walton Goggins) and Ava (Joelle Carter) about the mine robbery. Boyd claims he was forced into participating while Ava denies knowing the location of the missing money. Meanwhile, Winona (Natalie Zea) and Gary (William Ragsdale) fight over Gary's decision to put a mortgage loan on their home to buy a racehorse.

Winona shares her frustrations with Raylan (Timothy Olyphant), who finds the situation funny. While checking evidence, Winona steals a $100 bill. Winona then heads to the bank – presumably to deposit it – when the bank suddenly turns into a robbery. One of the robbers takes the bill and stomps on her face before they leave. At the office, Winona confesses to Raylan about the bill, angering him. One of the robbers, Frank Reasoner (Scott Wilson), contacts the authorities and talks to Mullen (Nick Searcy), telling him to meet him at a bridge.

Raylan is notified that two of the robbers are at another bank, preventing them from starting another robbery. Raylan finds that Frank tipped them off and the meeting turned out to be a facade. Mullen tracks Frank down, who intends to flee with the money to Mexico. Due to Frank's emphysema, he does not make it far in the airfield and Mullen captures him. Raylan recoups the money, including the $100 bill, and prevents Winona from facing charges. He tells her the news at his hotel room and both lie in the bed, with Raylan commenting that they will have to talk about their relationship "sooner or later".

== Reception ==
=== Viewers ===
In its original American broadcast, "Blaze of Glory" was seen by an estimated 2.37 million household viewers and gained a 0.8/2 ratings share among adults aged 18–49, according to Nielsen Media Research. This means that 0.8 percent of all households with televisions watched the episode, while 2 percent of all households watching television at that time watched it. This was a 13% decrease in viewership from the previous episode, which was watched by 2.71 million viewers with a 1.0/3 in the 18-49 demographics.

=== Critical reviews ===
"Blaze of Glory" received positive reviews from critics. Scott Tobias of The A.V. Club gave the episode a "B" grade and wrote, "Otherwise, this was a shaky episode by Justified standards. Curious to hear if I'm alone in questioning the mess Winona creates for herself; I'm guessing those who weren't resistant found a lot more to like about 'Blaze Of Glory' than I did."

Alan Sepinwall of HitFix wrote, "After the intensity of last week's explosive Boyd outing, Justified shifts into a more minor key for 'Blaze of Glory,' a decidedly laid-back outing whose two climactic scenes involve a bank robbery where everyone's moving slowly and speaking quietly, and a foot chase between an elderly man with emphysema and a slightly younger man with bad knees and a hearing aid."

Dan Forcella of TV Fanatic gave the episode a 4.5 star rating out of 5 and wrote, "If you would have told me that there would be zero screen time for the Bennetts and about five minutes for Boyd Crowder this week, and 'Blaze of Glory' would still be fantastic, I would have said you were crazy. That's just how good Justified has been in this second season."
