= Save My Love =

Save My Love may refer to:

- "Save My Love" (Justified), a 2011 episode of the TV series Justified
- "Save My Love", song by Bruce Springsteen from The Promise (Bruce Springsteen album)
- "Save My Love", song by Blue Murder from Nothin' but Trouble
- "Save My Love" (song), 2025 song by Marshmello, Ellie Goulding and Avaion
- "Save My Love", 2026 song by Kygo with Khalid and Gryffin
