= Tara Buck =

American actress

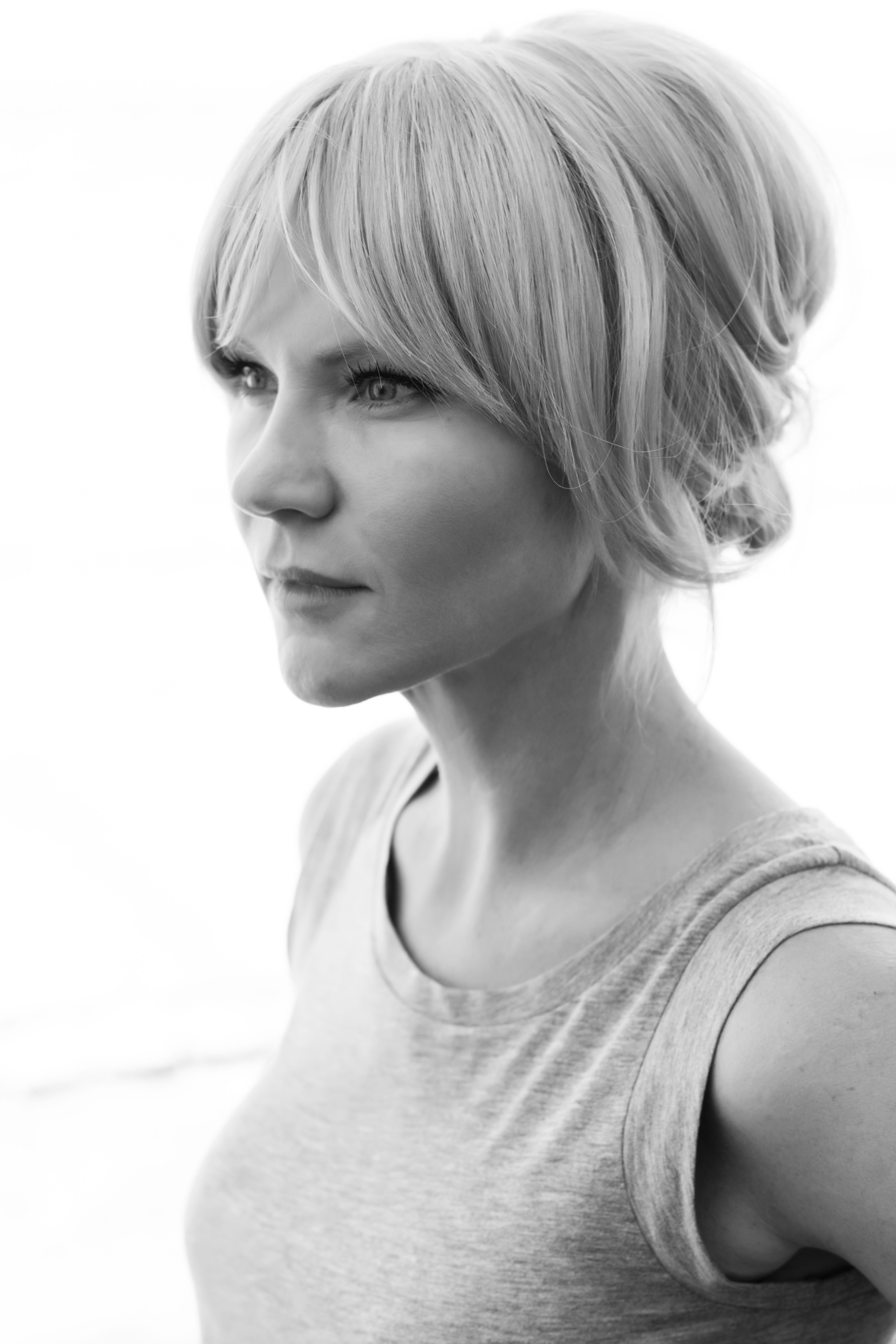
- Buck in 2014
- Other name: Tara L. Buck
- Education: American Academy of Dramatic Arts
- Occupation: Actress
- Years active: 1999–present
- Spouse: Chris Pierce (m. 2012)
- Website: tarabuck.com

Tara Buck is an American film, stage, and television actress. Buck is known for her roles in True Blood, Ray Donovan, and Party of Five.

== Early life ==
Buck attended Wood River High School in Hailey Idaho, where she took on her first acting roles in their theater productions. Later, she moved to Los Angeles to attend the American Academy of Dramatic Arts. Shortly after graduating, Buck landed her first recurring television role on the series Party of Five.

== Career ==
=== Theater ===
Buck has starred in numerous live theater productions including Paula Vogel's Pulitzer Prize-winning play How I Learned to Drive in 2010 and in the West Coast premiere of Ten Cent Night written by Marisa Wegrzyn in 2009. She was nominated for an Ovation Award for her performance in 2004's A Gift From Heaven.

=== Television ===
On television, Buck is known for her recurring role as Ginger in the HBO series True Blood. She appeared on the show from 2008 to 2014 and was promoted to series regular for the seventh and final season of the show.

In 2008 Tara also completed a motorcycle-themed drama pilot for HBO called 1% directed by Alan Taylor and written by Michael Tolkin. The show never aired on HBO due to creative conflicts with early Hells Angels organizer and frequent spokesman Sonny Barger.

Buck has made guest appearances on Bones, The X-Files, Criminal Minds, Justified, Cold Case, Nip/Tuck, The Shield, Southland, The Closer and Bloodline.

In 2016 and 2017, Buck recurred on the fourth and fifth seasons of the Showtime series Ray Donovan with Liev Schreiber. She played patrol cop Maureen Dougherty, an LAPD patrol cop and love interest to Terry Donovan. In the show, Buck's character, Maureen, joined the Donovan family when she married Terry Donovan (Eddie Marsan) in season 5, episode 2, entitled "Las Vegas".

In 2018, Buck guest-starred as Madeline Locarno in the pilot episode for the Shondaland-produced show, For The People on ABC.

=== Film ===
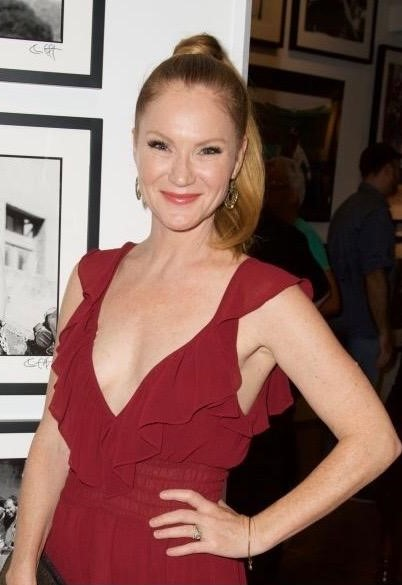
Tara Buck at 2017 VIP Reception for Chris Cuffaro's Exhibit "Greatest Hits: Martini Ranch”

Buck was featured in the crime thriller Tomorrow You’re Gone, in 2013, a film based on the book, Boot Tracks.

The actress has appeared in several independent feature films including the American-Italian-Mexican drama film, Medeas in 2014 with Catalina Sandino Moreno and directed by Andrea Pallaoro. The film premiered at the 70th annual Venice Film Festival, and was well received by critics. She appeared in the horror film, At the Devil's Door with Naya Rivera that premiered at the South by Southwest (SXSW) film festival in 2014.

Buck was the lead in the 2016 film Great Plains, from director [Blair Hayes] and starred in the 2016 Judd Apatow Netflix comedy film Pee-wee's Big Holiday.

She starred in A Mother’s Escape also in 2016 for the Lifetime channel.

In 2017, Buck starred in and executive produced the film, Son of Perdition, a period drama set in the early days of the American frontier which was written and directed by Trevor Riley.

Buck had a supporting role in the crime thriller, Inherit The Viper with Josh Hartnett. The film had its world premiere at the Zurich Film Festival in 2019 and was released internationally by Lionsgate in early 2020.

== Personal life ==
Buck married singer/songwriter Chris Pierce in 2012. She lives in Southern California with her husband.

The actress is an outspoken feminist and has been a guest speaker for multiple events that address issues of gender inequality including, among others, "Conversations With Exceptional Women," an annual conference bringing together highly accomplished women from all professional areas to discuss female-related concerns.

Buck founded her own production company called She & I Productions. The company, based in Los Angeles, is a film and television production company geared toward female content. Its mission is a commitment to the empowerment of women both in front of and behind the camera.

Buck and her husband are co-owners of a boutique wine label called Ledbetter. Ledbetter Wines can be found in many California restaurants.

== Filmography ==
=== Film ===
Year	Title	Role	Notes
1999	Thinking Positive	Sara	Short film
2008	1%	Kimmy	TV film
2010	The Grind	Krisi	
2010	2nd Take	Evelyn	
2011	The Life Zone	Lisa Raines	
2012	Currency	Screen Test	Short film
2012	K-11	Crystal	
2012	Tomorrow You're Gone	Blonde Mistress	
2013	Medeas	Ada	
2013	My Mother Is Not a Fish	Cindy	Short film
2013	The Night Visitor	Hilda	
2014	At the Devil's Door	Yolanda	
2015	The Best Driver in the County	Vivian	Short film
2016	Great Plains	Murel	
2016	Pee-wee's Big Holiday	Beverly	
2017	Son of Perdition	Kristine Tullamore	Also executive producer
2019	Inherit the Viper	Eliza	
2020	Run Sweetheart Run	Raven	
2020	Joe Bell	Mary Ivy	
2020	Noise in the Middle	Sara Brooderick	
2021	In the Desert of Dark and Light	Iris	Short film

=== Television ===
Year	Title	Role	Notes
1999	Party of Five	Ricki (as Tara L. Buck)	Episodes: "Haunted" & "Otherwise Engaged"
2000	The X-Files	Blueberry	Episode: "Orison"
2000	Sabrina, the Teenage Witch	Nancy	Episode: "House of Pi's"
2002	The Division	Aurora	Episode: "Welcome Home"
2003	Without a Trace	Julie	Episode: "Underground Railroad"
2003	JAG	P.O. Translator	Episode: "Touchdown"
2004	Six Feet Under	Girl with Edie	Episode: "Parallel Play"
2004	NCIS	P.O. Debra Marshall	Episode: "The Good Wives Club"
2005	The Shield	Susan Gary	Episode: "Hurt"
2005	Strong Medicine	Josie Weaver	Episode: "Dying Inside"
2005	Nip/Tuck	Rhea Reynolds	Episodes: "Rhea Reynolds" & "Granville Trapp"
2006	The Closer	Ginnifer Rawley	Episode: "The Other Woman"
2006	Cold Case	Kylie	Episode: "The Red and the Blue"
2009	Bones	Valerie Daniels	Episode: "The Princess and the Pear"
2010	The Whole Truth	Melissa Derrico	Episode: "Cold Case"
2011	Prime Suspect USA	Kasey Monrad	Episode: "Bitch"
2011	Southland	Denise	Episode: "Graduation Day"
2011	Justified	Sally Peener	Episodes: "The Spoil" & "Save My Love"
2012	True Blood: Jessica’s Blog	Ginger	Episodes: "What to Do When the Guy You’re Sleepin’ With Shoots You in the Head" & "Retail Therapy"
2013	Criminal Minds	Hannah Johnson	Episode: "Gatekeeper"
2014	Longmire	Phoebe Greene	Episode: "Of Children and Travelers"
2008–2014	True Blood	Ginger	Series regular, 24 episodes
2015	Backstrom	Arianna Fitch	Episode: "I Like to Watch"
2016–2017	A Mother's Escape	Ray Donovan-Maureen Dougherty	Recurring role, 9 episodes
2017	Bloodline	Lannie	Episode: "Part 24"
2018	For The People	Madeline Locarno	Episode: "Pilot"
2021	Shameless	Letty	Episode: "Do Not Go Gentle Into That Good... Eh, Screw It"
2021	9-1-1: Lone Star	Amy	Episode: "Bad Call"
2022	Magnum P.I.	Jill Picone	Episode: "Angels Sometimes Kill"

== Awards and nominations ==
Year	Association	Category	Nominated work	Result
2004	Ovation Award	Best Supporting Actress	A Gift from Heaven	Nominated
