= Mark Colson =

American actor and former theatre professor

Mark Colson is an American actor and former theatre professor at Michigan State University.

== Education ==
Colson received his BFA at Webster University-Conservatory for the Performing Arts and his MFA from the National Theater Conservatory, Denver Center. He also studied at the Yale School of Drama and the British American Drama Academy in Oxford.

== Career ==
Colson's theatrical background includes work at The Denver Center, The Repertory Theatre of St. Louis, The Odyssey, Theatre Banshee in Los Angeles, The Hudson Theatre, The Boarshead Theatre, and The Sierra Repertory Theatre. In 2016, he played the role of Richard in the Purple Rose Theatre's world premiere of The Gaps in the Fossil Record Record. He has also performed as Iago in the American Shakespeare Collective's Othello.

In 2008, Colson was nominated for an Ovation Award for his performance of "Slim" in Theater Banshee's Of Mice and Men.

In 1992, Colson's film career began with the recurring role of Gabriel in the television series Days of Our Lives. His film and TV work includes Clint Eastwood's Flags of Our Father, Mad Men, Demolition Man, Bones, and with Amy Poehler on Parks and Recreation.

Colson also used professional motion capture to play George A. Romero in the 2010 video game Call of the Dead.

Colson worked as a film and theater professor at Michigan State University. In 2015, he pioneered the Theatre2Film project which gives filmmaking and theater students a hands-on learning experience. A student-written piece is performed as a stage play then transformed into a screenplay to be acted by the same students.

== Filmography ==
Year	Title	Role	Notes
1993	Demolition Man	Warden William Smithers - Young	
1997	Profiler	Carter Poole	Episode - "Venom"
1998	Star Trek Voyager	Dream Alien	Episode - "Waking Moments"
1998	Working	Prison	Episode - "The Consultant"
1999	Sabrina the Teenage Witch	Security Attendant	Episode - "Salem and Juliette"
2000	Judging Amy	Motorcycle Cop	Episode - "The Wee Hours"
2000	Locked Up Down Shorty's	Man At Bar	
2002	Grounded for Life	P.E. Coach	Episode - "Eddie Said Knock You Out"
2002	Gilmore Girls	Western Shirt Man	Episode - "Lorelai's Graduation Day"
2002	Alias	OPS Director	Episode - "Cipher"
2003	The Curse and the Smoking Jacker	Mark	
2003	Carnivàle	Farmer	Episode - "Tipton"
2004	Angel	Izzy	Episode - "Not Fade Away," "Power Play," "You're Welcome"
2005	The King of Queens	Gus	Episode - "Deconstructing Carrie"
2005	Pendulum		
2006	Invasion	Deputy Munger	Episode - "Run and Gun," "The Sun Also Rises," "All God's Creature," "Redemption, "Power"
2006	Hi, Hello		
2006	Flags of our Father	Reporter (in LA ) #2	
2006	CSI: NY	Kevin Green	Episode - "And here's to you, Mrs Azrael"
2007	Marked	Dr. Frederickson	
2007	Heroes	Dr. Zern	Episode - "Chapter Three - 'Kindred'," "Chapter Two 'Lizards'," Chapter One - 'Four Months Later'"
2008	Passed the Door of Darkness	Murphy McCasey	
2008	My Own Worst Enemy	Second Prisoner	Episode - "Love in All the Wrong Places"
2009	Medium	Balding Man	Episode - "A Person of Interest"
2010	Lie to Me	Angry Man	Episode - "Angry Man"
2010	Mad Men	Bill Shepard	Episode - "Chinese Wall"
2011	Justified	Hobart Curtis	Episode - "Debts and Accounts," "Brother's Keepers"
2011	Parks and Recreation	Head Chairman	Episode - "Jerry's Painting"
2011	Bones	Todd Belacleets	Episode - "The Change in The Game"
2013	Low Winter Sun	Ken Benson	Episode - "Surrender"
2016	Banshee	Aaron Boedicker	Episode - "The Burden of Beauty," "Something Out of the Bible"
2016	Outsiders	Pat Kersey	Episode - "All Hell," "Day Most Blessed," "Trust," "Its Good to Be King"

== Theatrical resume (since 2008) ==
Year	Title	Role	Theater	Director
2008	Of Mice and Men	Slim	Theatre Banshee	Rebecca Marcotte
2009	The Field	Mick	Theatre Banshee	Sean Branney
2010	The Crucible	Putnam	Theatre Banshee	Sean Branney
2010	Macbeth	Ross	Theatre Banshee	Sean Branney
2010	The Hostage	I.R.A. Officer	Theatre Banshee	McKerrin Kelly
2012	Othello	Iago	The American Shakespeare Coll.	Vincent Murphy
2014	Cyrano de Bergerac	Cyrano	MSU Fairchild Theatre	Edward Daranyi
2014	Gravedigger (World Premiere)	Kurt	Williamston Theatre	John Lepard
2015	Jacob Marley's Christmas Carol	Jacob Marley	Williamston Theatre	Julia Glander
2016	Gaps in the Fossil Record (World Premiere)	Richard	Purple Rose Theatre Company	Guy Sanville
2016	Pulp	R.A. Lyncroft	Williamston Theatre	Tony Caselli
2018	Sherlock Holmes and the Adventure of the Elusive Ear (World Premiere)	Sherlock Holmes	Purple Rose Theatre Company	Guy Sanville
2019	Sherlock Holmes and the Adventure of the Fallen Soufflé (World Premiere)	Sherlock Holmes	Purple Rose Theatre Company	Michelle Mountain

== Union affiliations ==
- Actor's Equity Association: 1990 – present
- SAG-AFTRA: 1993 – present
