= Rebecca Creskoff =

American actress

- Education: University of Pennsylvania (BA); New York University (MFA)
- Occupation: Actress
- Years active: 1998–present
- Spouse: Michael Glassner (m. 2012)

Rebecca Creskoff is an American actress.

== Career ==
Creskoff graduated from the University of Pennsylvania before attending New York University, where she received her master of fine arts degree. She has guest-starred in a number of notable television series, including Law & Order, Law & Order: Special Victims Unit, The West Wing, Mad Men, Desperate Housewives, Hannah Montana, Justified, and Curb Your Enthusiasm. She has had recurring roles in The Practice, Girlfriends, Jonas, Bates Motel, and Hung, becoming a series regular on the show's second season.

Creskoff also co-starred in the sitcoms Greetings from Tucson and Quintuplets, both of which ended after one season.

== Personal life ==
In 2012, she married fertility doctor Michael Glassner in two ceremonies—the first at a resort in Tulum, Mexico, and the second at Congregation Rodeph Shalom in Philadelphia.

== Filmography ==
Film and television
Year	Title	Role	Notes
1998	Finding North	Gina	Independent film
1998–2010	Law & Order	Charlotte/Veronica Masters	TV series, 2 episodes
1999	Law & Order: Special Victims Unit	Waitress	TV series, 1 episode
2000	The West Wing	Sarah Jordan	TV series, 1 episode
2000	The Practice	Dr. Jeannie Reynolds	TV series, 3 episodes
2001	Friends & Family	Jenny Patrizzi	Independent film
2001	Kristen	Janis	TV series, 1 episode
2003	Phil at the Gate	Unknown	Made-for-TV film
2002–2003	Greetings from Tucson	Elizabeth Tiant	TV series, regular role
2004–2005	Quintuplets	Carol Chase	TV series, regular role
2005–2006	Girlfriends	Jennifer Miller	TV series, recurring role, 6 episodes
2006	Stroller Wars	Cara	Made-for-TV film
2006	The New Adventures of Old Christine	Hilary	TV series, 1 episode
2007-2015	Mad Men	Barbra Katz	TV series, 2 episodes
2008	Libertyville	Lorie	Made-for-TV film
2008–2009	Hannah Montana	Nurse Carol	TV series, 2 episodes
2008	Terminator: The Sarah Connor Chronicles	Anne Fields	TV series, 1 episode
2009	Party Down	Liddy McSpadden	TV series, 1 episode
2009	NCIS	Hillary Taffet	TV series, 1 episode
2009–2010	Jonas	Sandy Lucas	TV series, recurring role
2010–2011	Parenthood	Carly Barrow	TV series, 2 episodes
2009–2011	Hung	Lenore	Recurring role (season 1), Regular role (seasons 2–3)
2010	Knucklehead	Tina	
2010	Desperate Housewives	Stacy Strauss	TV series, 1 episode
2010	$#*! My Dad Says		Cameo in season 1, episode 6
2011	Justified	Carol Johnson	TV series, 3 episodes
2011	Curb Your Enthusiasm	Heidi	TV series, 1 episode
2012	How I Met Your Mother	Geraldine	TV series, 1 episode
2014	Bates Motel	Christine Heldens	TV series, season 2
2018–2020	Single Parents	Big Red	4 Episodes
2019	Claws	Melba Lovestone	Recurring role (season 3)
2019	Law & Order: Special Victims Unit	Claire Newbury	S20, E12 "Dear Ben"
2024	Feud: Capote vs. The Swans	Happy Rockefeller	Episode: "Pilot"
2024	ClearMind	Nora	Film
2024	Elsbeth	Tracy	Episode: "Reality Shock"
2025	Echo Valley	Emma Hanway	Film
