= Kevin Rankin (actor) =

American actor

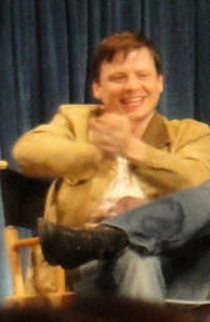
- Rankin in 2011
- Born: April 18, 1976 (age 50); Baton Rouge, Louisiana, U.S.
- Occupation: Actor
- Years active: 1997–present
- Spouse: Jill Farley (m. 2010)
- Children: 2

Kevin Rankin (born April 18, 1976) is an American actor. He is known for his roles as Herc in the NBC series Friday Night Lights, Tyler Briggs in the NBC series Trauma, Roe Sanders in the CBS series Unforgettable, Kenny in the AMC series Breaking Bad, Derek "Devil" Lennox in the FX TV series Justified and Aloysius "Wish" Aiken in the ABC show R.J. Decker.

== Early life and career ==
After watching the television show The Fall Guy, Rankin originally intended on becoming a stunt man, until he realized the main character, a stunt man, was, in fact, played by an actor, Lee Majors.

Rankin began his acting career with an appearance on the television show Unsolved Mysteries, followed by a small role in the drama film The Apostle in 1997. Starting in 2000, roles in various television series followed, notably Buffy the Vampire Slayer, NYPD Blue and Philly. In 2002, he starred as "Doc" in eleven episodes of the series My Guide to Becoming a Rock Star. He also had other, longer-running appearances in Undeclared, Six Feet Under, State of Mind, Bionic Woman, and Friday Night Lights.

In 2009, he landed the role of "Tyler Briggs" in the NBC series Trauma; the series was canceled after the first season. In 2011, he guest-starred in five episodes of the HBO drama Big Love. He played a main role in the criminal series Unforgettable from 2011-12. After a restructuring of the show, his character was dropped in the second season. From 2017 to 2022, he played Bryce Hussar in TNT's drama Claws.

Starting 2026 he plays a main role as Aloysius "Wish" Aiken an ex-con and a bar owner in R.J. Decker.

== Personal life ==
In 2000, Rankin moved to Los Angeles, where he met Jill Farley

At the shooting of the pilot episode of Trauma, he proposed to her. They married on October 23, 2010, and have a son and daughter together.

== Filmography ==
=== Film ===
Year	Title	Role	Notes
1997	The Apostle	Young Man in Car	
1999	Clean and Narrow	Tommy Lee	
2001	Carman: The Champion	Scrappy	
2003	Riverside	Brent	Short film
2003	Hulk	Harper	
2005	Heads N TailZ	Heads	
2007	Box One Forty-Seven	Bill	Short film
2010	Friendship!	Marvin	
2011	The Chaperone	Goldy	
2012	Santeria: The Soul Possessed	Brother Neil	Direct-to-video
2012	Congratulations	Casey Tremblay	Co-executive producer
2013	Pawn Shop Chronicles	Randy	Direct-to-video
2013	Dallas Buyers Club	T. J.	
2013	White House Down	Carl Killick	
2014	Wild	Greg	
2014	Dawn of the Planet of the Apes	McVeigh	
2016	Hell or High Water	Billy Rayburn	
2018	Skyscraper	Ray	
2019	El Camino: A Breaking Bad Movie	Kenny	

=== Television ===
Year	Title	Role	Notes
1997	Unsolved Mysteries		
2000	After Diff'rent Strokes: When the Laughter Stopped	Lanny	Television film
2000	Buffy the Vampire Slayer	Donny Maclay	Episode: "Family"
2001	Spin City	Kurt	Episode: "Trainstopping"
2001–2002	Undeclared	Lucien	Recurring role
2002	Philly	Marty Schlosser	Episode: "Tall Tales"
2002	NYPD Blue	Chris Nelson	Episode: "One in the Nuts"
2002	Birds of Prey	Dr. Lewis Melfin	Episode: "Three Birds and a Baby"
2002	My Guide to Becoming a Rock Star	Doc	Main cast
2003	All About the Andersons	—N/a	Director, episode: "My Hero"
2004	The O.C.	Lucas	Episode: "The Strip"
2004	Without a Trace	Larry Schneider	Episode: "Transitions"
2005	Six Feet Under	Johnny	4 episodes
2006	Bones	Mike Doyle	Episode: "The Man in the Morgue"
2006–2008	Friday Night Lights	Herc	Recurring role (seasons 1–3)
2007	CSI: Crime Scene Investigation	Shawn Curtis	Episode: "Leaving Las Vegas"
2007	Grey's Anatomy	Jack Vaughan	2 episodes
2007	State of Mind	Arthur Cromwell	3 episodes
2007	Bionic Woman	Nathan	Recurring role
2008	Law & Order	Dean Emerson	Episode: "Misbegotten"
2008	NCIS	Dennis Moran	Episode: "Stakeout"
2008	My Name Is Earl	TR	Episode: "Killerball"
2008	The Closer	Dean Murphy	Episode: "Live Wire"
2008	1%		Television film
2009	Last of the Ninth	Slick Rick	Television film
2009	Lost	Jerry	Episode: "LaFleur"
2009	In Plain Sight	Jerry Rogan / Jerry Royal	Episode: "In My Humboldt Opinion"
2009–2010	Trauma	Tyler Briggs	Main cast
2010	The Mentalist	Danny Ruskin	Episode: "Cackle-Bladder Blood"
2010	All Signs of Death	Talbot	Television pilot
2010	The Odds	Holt McCready	Television film
2010–2012	Justified	Derek "Devil" Lennox	Recurring role (seasons 1–3)
2011	Lie to Me	Kent Clark	Episode: "Saved"
2011	Big Love	Verlan Walker	5 episodes
2011–2012	Unforgettable	Roe Saunders	Main cast (season 1)
2012–2013	Breaking Bad	Kenny	7 episodes
2014	Gracepoint	Paul Coates	Main cast
2014	The Newsroom	Cellmate	Episode: "Oh Shenandoah"
2015	Halt and Catch Fire	Henry Clark	2 episodes
2016	Lucifer	Malcolm Graham	7 episodes
2017–2022	Claws	Bryce Husser	Main cast
2020	The Umbrella Academy	Elliott	Recurring role (season 2)
2022–2023	East New York	Tommy Killian	Main cast
2026–present	R.J. Decker	Aloysius "Wish" Aiken	Main cast
