= Peter Murnik =

American actor (born 1965)

- Born: December 14, 1965 (age 60); Concord, Massachusetts, U.S.
- Occupation: Actor

Peter Murnik (born December 14, 1965) is an American actor with roles in Justified, JAG, Pensacola: Wings of Gold, Martial Law, and ER. He also had a role in the 1998 movie Hard Rain.

== Early life and education ==
Murnik was born in Concord, Massachusetts. He attended Boston University.

== Career ==
Murnik had a role as Lt. Martel in the two-part Seinfeld episode "The Trip". In that his character investigated a murder case in Los Angeles and arrested Kramer as the serial killer, but eventually let him go after a long interrogation that put Kramer in tears. He was a main character in the BYUtv series, Granite Flats.

== Filmography ==
=== Film ===
Year	Title	Role	Notes
1990	Pastime	Simmons	
1990	Disturbed	Brad	
1991	Body Parts	Mark Draper	
1991	Father of the Bride	Patrolman	
1993	Golden Gate	Agent Byrd	
1995	Phoenix	Dillon	
1995	Til Death Do Us Part	Paul	
1996	It's My Party	Greg King	
1996	Cityscrapes: Los Angeles	Elliot	
1996	Rowing Through	John Biglow	
1998	Hard Rain	Phil	
1998	Armageddon	NASA Tech	
1998	The Party Crashers	Former Athlete	
1999	The Hungry Bachelors Club	Jethro Youngblood	
2006	Young, Single & Angry	Dr. David	
2011	Transformers: Dark of the Moon	Tracking Station Supervisor	
2011	The Soccer Nanny	Coach Bobby Breed	
2012	The Paperboy	Death Row Guard	
2016	Suburban Cowboy	Shorty	
2016	Lucifer	Sheriff Davis	
2020	Burning Dog	Mysterious Suit	
TBA	All the Colors of the Dark	Officer Daniels	

=== Television ===
Year	Title	Role	Notes
1989	TV 101	Harold Ross	Episode: "Keegan's Past"
1989	Thunderboat Row	Moby Griffin	Television film
1989	Tour of Duty	2nd Lt. Miller	Episode: "Doc Hoc"
1989	Booker	Chester Arrizola	Episode: "Razing Arizona"
1990	Gunsmoke: The Last Apache	Lt. Davis	Television film
1990	The Outsiders	Hal	Episode: "Tequila Sunset"
1991	Quantum Leap	Second Military Officer	Episode: "The Wrong Stuff"
1992	Seinfeld	Lt. Martel	Episode: "The Trip"
1992	Angel Street	Officer Snepp	Episode: "Midnight Times a Hundred"
1993	Class of '61	Upton	Television film
1993	Northern Exposure	Bob Miller	Episode: "Kaddish, for Uncle Manny"
1993	The John Larroquette Show	Bob	Episode: "Thirty Day Chip"
1994	Against the Wall	Jess	Television film
1994	Dead at 21	Lorne	Episode: "Cry Baby Cry"
1994	Diagnosis: Murder	Ralph McReedy	Episode: "The Busy Body"
1996	Andersonville	Limber Jim	Miniseries
1997	Vanishing Point	Gilmore	Television film
1997	ER	Officer Mulvahill	Episode: "When the Bough Breaks"
1997	The Pretender	Bobby Cain	Episode: "Over the Edge"
1997–2001	JAG	Clark Palmer / Tom Boone	7 episodes
1998	Pensacola: Wings of Gold	Monty Pearl	2 episodes
1998	Martial Law	Douglas Seed	Episode: "Bad Seed"
2003	Miracles	Detective Wilson Estep	Episode: "Hand of God"
2007	Smith	Bill Turkenson	Episode: "Six"
2010	Trauma	Johnny the Paramedic	Episode: "13"
2010	Desperate Housewives	Officer	Episode: "Sorry Grateful"
2010	The Event	Mr. Berg	2 episodes
2011	The Cape	Officer #2	Episode: "Pilot"
2011	Rizzoli & Isles	Rod Mason	Episode: "Remember Me"
2011–2013	Justified	Trooper Tom Bergen	11 episodes
2012	Shameless	Colonel Kirk McNally	2 episodes
2012	Touch	Officer McKinney	Episode: "Gyre, Part 1"
2012	Vegas	John Turley	Episode: "Solid Citizens"
2013–2015	Granite Flats	Hershel Jenkins	21 episodes
2016	The Fluffy Shop	Officer Gavin	Television film
2017	The Mist	Mike Copeland	3 episodes
2017	Mindhunter	Detective Carver	2 episodes
2019	The Kids Are Alright	Motorcycle Cop	Episode: "Low Expectations"
2019	SEAL Team	Dr. Wilson	2 episodes
2020	NCIS	Admiral Michael Caplinger	Episode: "The Arizona"
2021	Animal Kingdom	The Wizard	2 episodes
