= Erica Tazel =

American theatre and television actor (born 1977)

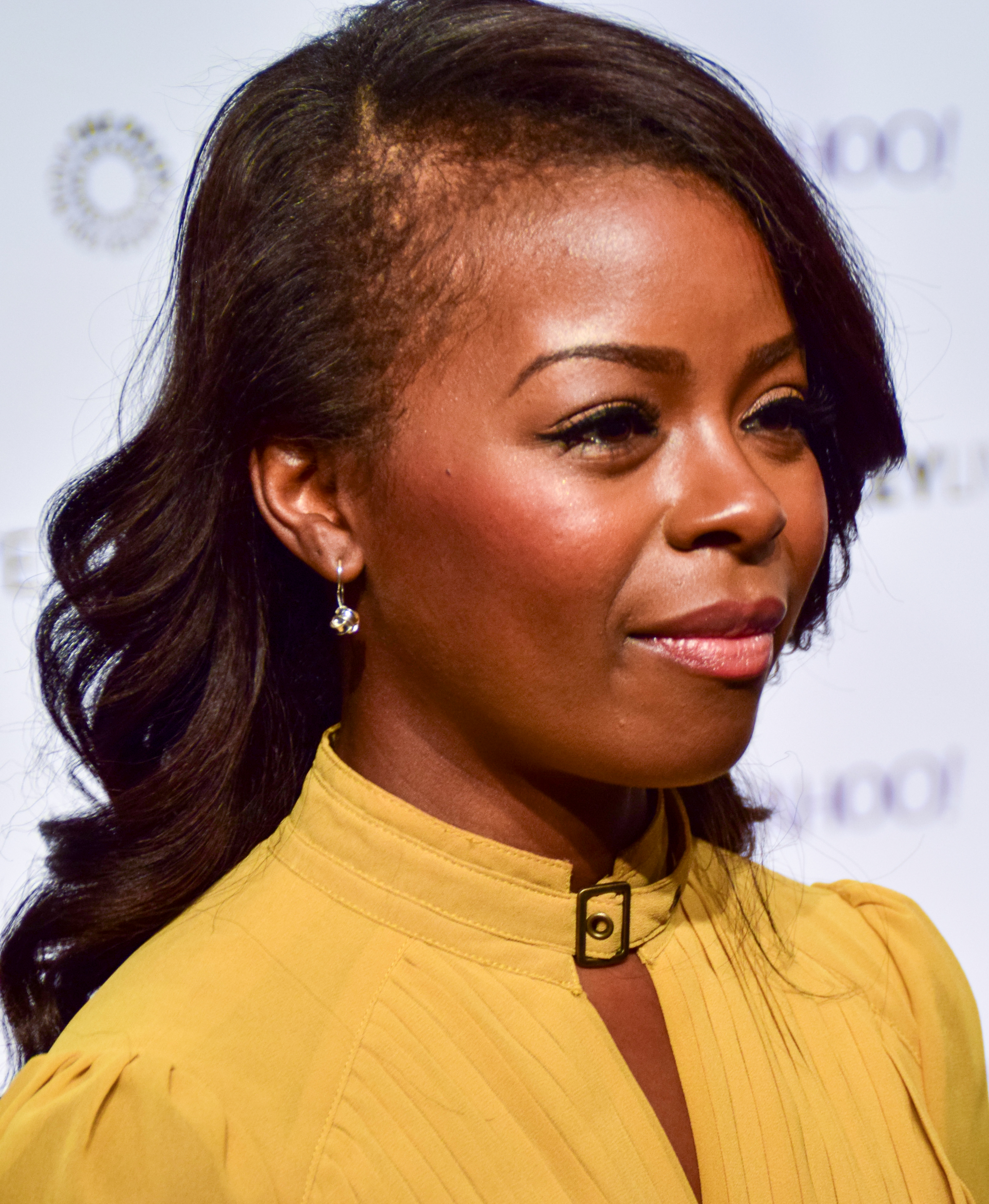
- Tazel at the Paley Center in 2015
- Born: 1977 (age 48–49); Dallas, Texas, U.S.
- Education: Spelman College (BA); New York University (MFA)
- Occupation: Actress
- Years active: 2000–present
- Known for: Justified

Erica Tazel (born 1977) is an American theatre and television actress best known for the role of US Deputy Marshal Rachel Brooks in the FX television series Justified (2010–2015).

== Life and career ==
Tazel holds a B.A. from Spelman College and an M.F.A. from New York University's Graduate Acting Program.

She made her professional acting debut at the New York Shakespeare Festival’s The Winter’s Tale (2000); further roles include at the Royal Shakespeare Company's Cymbeline, and an off-Broadway appearance in Playwrights Horizons' Juvenilia. Tazel was nominated for the L.A. Drama Critics Circle award for Lead Performance, for her work in I Have Before Me a Remarkable Document Given To Me by a Young Lady from Rwanda (role of Juliette, 2007) at The Colony Theatre in Burbank, CA, and received the NAACP Theatre Award for Best Lead Female (2007) for that same role.

On screen, Tazel has made limited appearances, including a minor role in the David Duchovny drama House of D (2004, table below), starring Anton Yelchin, Robin Williams, Téa Leoni, and Erykah Badu.

Tazel's television debut was as a dance teacher in an episode of Sex and the City (2001); prior to her supporting role in Justified she was a guest lead on Without A Trace, had recurring roles on Jericho and Third Watch, and guest roles on programs including The Office, ER, Law & Order and Law & Order: Special Victims Unit, Life, Heartland, Bones, and Firefly.

== Filmography ==
=== Film ===
Year	Film	Role	Notes
2004	House of D	Reader	
2010	As It Is	Lark	Short
2015	Runaway Island	Vonda Hines	
2015	Mr. Right	Lisa	
2016	Gubagude Ko	Dembe	Short
2017	Lawman	Nellie Reeves	Short
2017	Odious	Evelyn	
2019	Cognitive	Nurse Alisse	Short
2019	The Summer People	Kim Nixon	TV movie
2020	Always and Forever	Paige	
2021	The Deadliest Lie	Sam	
2022	The Devil You Know	Eva Dylan	
2023	Big George Foreman	Mary Foreman	

=== Television ===
Year	Title	Role	Notes
2001	Sex and the City	Dance Teacher Grace	Episode: "Baby, Talk Is Cheap"
2001	Third Watch	Shaquana Golden	Episode: "He Said/She Said" & "Childhood Memories"
2002	Firefly	Doralee	Episode: "Safe"
2003	Law & Order: Special Victims Unit	Lynn Hauser	Episode: "Risk"
2003	Law & Order	Receptionist	Episode: "Suicide Box"
2006	Bones	Karen Merton	Episode: "The Soldier on the Grave"
2007	Jericho	Jessica Williams	Recurring Cast: Season 1
2007	Without a Trace	Tess Pratt	Episode: "Skin Deep"
2007	Heartland	Temple	Episode: "A Beautiful Day"
2007	ER	Mrs. Birk	Episode: "Blackout"
2008	Life	Mum at Park	Episode: "Find Your Happy Place"
2009	The Office	Julia	Episode: "Lecture Circuit: Part 1"
2010–15	Justified	Rachel Brooks	Main Cast
2015	Kroll Show	Detective Hall	Recurring Cast: Season 3
2015	NCIS	Coach Curry	Episode: "Troll"
2016	Roots	Matilda	Episode: "Part 3 & 4"
2017	The Night Shift	Dr. Bella Cummings	Recurring Cast: Season 4
2017	The Orville	Baleth	Episode: "Mad Idolatry"
2017–18	The Good Fight	Barbara Kolstad	Main Cast: Season 1, Guest: Season 2
2018	DC's Legends of Tomorrow	Esi Jiwe	Episode: "Guest Starring John Noble"
2019	Queen Sugar	Deesha Brown-Sonnier	Recurring Cast: Season 4
2019	Raising Dion	Danielle	Episode: "Issue #107: Why So Vomity?"
2020	God Friended Me	Bonnie	Episode: "The Fugitive"
2020	Lovecraft Country	Dora Freeman	Recurring Cast
2021-23	Truth Be Told	Charise Spivey	Recurring Cast: Season 2-3
2022	All American: Homecoming	Veronica Skinner	Episode: "Move On" & "Confessions"

=== Video games ===
Year	Title	Role	Notes
2016	Mafia 3	Cassandra	Voice & likeness
