= Francis Kenny =

American cinematographer

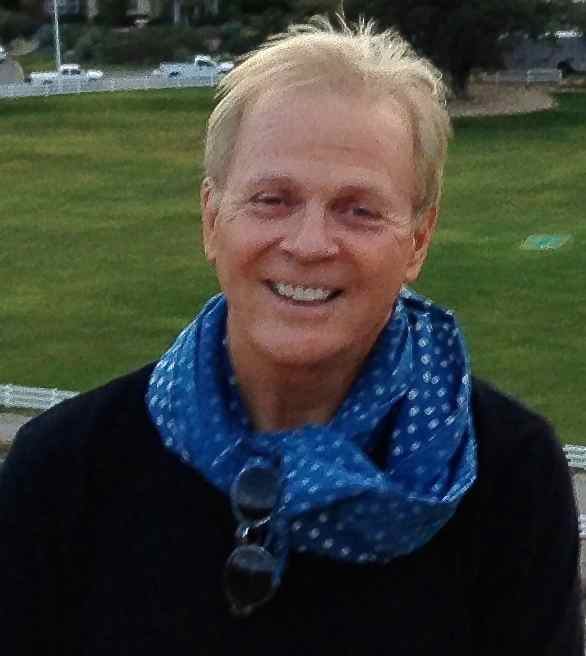
- Kenny, ASC 2014
- Born: Indianapolis, Indiana, U.S.
- Occupation: Cinematographer
- Children: 1

Francis Kenny A.S.C. is an American cinematographer.

== Background and education ==
Kenny is a twice board member of the American Society of Cinematographers and member of the AMPAS Executive Committee for Cinematographers.

Kenny was born in Indianapolis, Indiana, attending schools in Indianapolis, Indiana; Cleveland, Ohio; Atlanta, Georgia; New Orleans, Louisiana:, Portland, Oregon; Seattle, Washington; and high school in New Orleans, Louisiana. At the age of 16, he entered The University of Texas at Austin; he later attended Harvard University; and Hofstra University. He holds degrees in sociology, English literature and communications.

His father, Francis Bernard Kenny, graduated from Princeton University, worked for the Shell Oil Company and eventually became treasurer. His grandfather, Herman Adkins, was a test pilot for the government at the Indianapolis Experimental Station (Civil Aeronautics Authority) and flew the NC-11 "flying laboratory". The airplane is now located at the National Air and Space Museum in Washington, D.C. Herman Adkins later built The Happy Landings Resort, Lake of the Ozark, in Sunrise Beach, Missouri. Adkins was a member of the secretive club for aviators called The Quiet Birdmen.

== Career ==
Francis Kenny began his career working on documentaries with the filmmaker David Hoffman, whom he met at Hofstra University.

Kenny was the cinematographer on the Academy Award-winning feature documentary He Makes Me Feel Like Dancin'. He has photographed commercials and documentaries in Afghanistan, Iran, Pakistan, Israel, Lebanon, Sri Lanka, Australia, Singapore, Sumatra, Korea, Hong Kong, Japan, England, France, Germany, Italy, Norway, Denmark, Sweden and Morocco.

He became an active member of The American Society of Cinematographers in 1996. He served as the Chairman of the ASC Membership Committee from 2001 until 2011. In 2012, he received the ASC Presidents Award.

== Filmography ==
This filmography is incomplete (for both film and television work).

=== Film ===
Year	Title	Director
1983	He Makes Me Feel Like Dancin'	Emile Ardolino
1983	Redd Foxx: Video in a Plain Brown Wrapper	Jerry Finberg
1987	Campus Man	Ron Casden
1987	Salvation!	Beth B
1989	Heathers	Michael Lehmann
1991	New Jack City	Mario Van Peebles
1991	Cold Heaven	Nicolas Roeg
1991	House Party 2	George Jackson; Doug McHenry
1992	Class Act	Randall Miller
1993	Ed and His Dead Mother	Jonathan Wacks
1993	Coneheads	Steve Barron
1993	Wayne's World 2	Stephen Surjik
1994	Jason's Lyric	Doug McHenry
1996	A Thin Line Between Love and Hate	Martin Lawrence
1996	Harriet the Spy	Bronwen Hughes
1997	Bean	Mel Smith
1998	Denial	Adam Rifkin
1998	A Night at the Roxbury	John Fortenberry
1999	She's All That	Robert Iscove
2000	Scary Movie	Keenen Ivory Wayans
2001	Kingdom Come	Doug McHenry
2001	Finder's Fee	Jeff Probst
2001	How High	Jesse Dylan
2003	From Justin to Kelly	Robert Iscove
2005	Edison	David J. Burke
2007	Cover	Bill Duke

=== Television ===
Year	Title	Notes
1984	Strokes of Genius	TV miniseries directed by Amanda Pope
1989	Sweet Bird of Youth	TV movie directed by Nicolas Roeg
2010-2014	Justified	TV series
2013	Bonnie & Clyde	TV miniseries directed by Bruce Beresford

== Personal life ==
He currently resides in Santa Monica, California, with his daughter, who attends Parsons School of Design.
