= Fuck (2005 film) =

2005 American documentary film directed by Steve Anderson

- Directed by: Steve Anderson
- Produced by: Steve Anderson
- Starring: Steven Bochco; Pat Boone; Ben Bradlee; Drew Carey; Billy Connolly; Sam Donaldson; Janeane Garofalo; Ice-T; Ron Jeremy; Bill Maher; Judith Martin; David Milch; Alanis Morissette; Kevin Smith; Tera Patrick; Hunter S. Thompson
- Cinematography: Andre Fontanelle
- Edited by: Jayne Rodericks
- Music by: Carvin Knowles
- Production companies: Mudflap Films; Rainstorm Entertainment
- Distributed by: ThinkFilm
- Release dates: November 7, 2005 (AFI); November 10, 2006 (United States)
- Running time: 93 minutes
- Country: United States
- Language: American English

Fuck (stylized as F★CK) is a 2005 American documentary film by director Steve Anderson about the word fuck. The film argues that the word is an integral part of societal discussions about freedom of speech and censorship. It examines the term from perspectives which include art, linguistics, society and comedy, and begins with a segment from the 1965 propaganda film Perversion for Profit. Scholars and celebrities analyze perceptions of the word from differing perspectives. Journalist Sam Donaldson talks about the versatility of the word, and comedian Billy Connolly states it can be understood despite one's language or location. Musician Alanis Morissette comments that the word contains power because of its taboo nature. The film features the last recorded interview of author Hunter S. Thompson before his suicide. The film is dedicated to him. Scholars, including linguist Reinhold Aman, journalism analyst David Shaw and Oxford English Dictionary editor Jesse Sheidlower, explain the history and evolution of the word. Language professor Geoffrey Nunberg observes that the word's treatment by society reflects changes in our culture during the 20th century.

Anderson was exposed to public conceptions surrounding the word "fuck" by comedian George Carlin's monolog "Seven Words You Can Never Say on Television". He named the film Fuck despite anticipating problems with marketing. Animator Bill Plympton provided sequences illustrating key concepts in the film. The documentary was first shown at the AFI Film Festival on November 7, 2005, at ArcLight Hollywood in Hollywood and released by ThinkFilm in the United States on November 10, 2006.

Fuck's reviews were generally mixed. Film critic A. O. Scott called the documentary a battle between advocates of morality and supporters of freedom of expression. The Washington Post and the New York Daily News criticized its length and other reviewers disliked its repetitiveness – the word "fuck" is used 857 times in the film. In his 2009 book Fuck: Word Taboo and Protecting Our First Amendment Liberties, law professor Christopher M. Fairman called the movie "the most important film using 'fuck'".

== Content summary ==
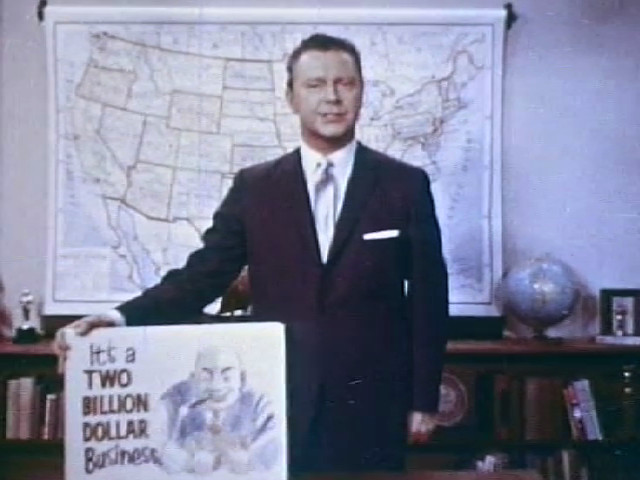
The documentary begins with a segment from the 1965 propaganda film Perversion for Profit.

Fuck begins with a segment from the 1965 propaganda film Perversion for Profit, followed by a clip from SpongeBob SquarePants (specifically, from the episode "Sailor Mouth") which states that the word can be used as a "sentence enhancer". The documentary includes commentary from film and television writers Kevin Smith and Steven Bochco; comedians Janeane Garofalo, Bill Maher, Drew Carey and Billy Connolly; musicians Chuck D, Alanis Morissette and Ice-T; political commentators Alan Keyes and Pat Boone; and journalists and Judith Martin. The word "fuck" is used 857 times during the film.

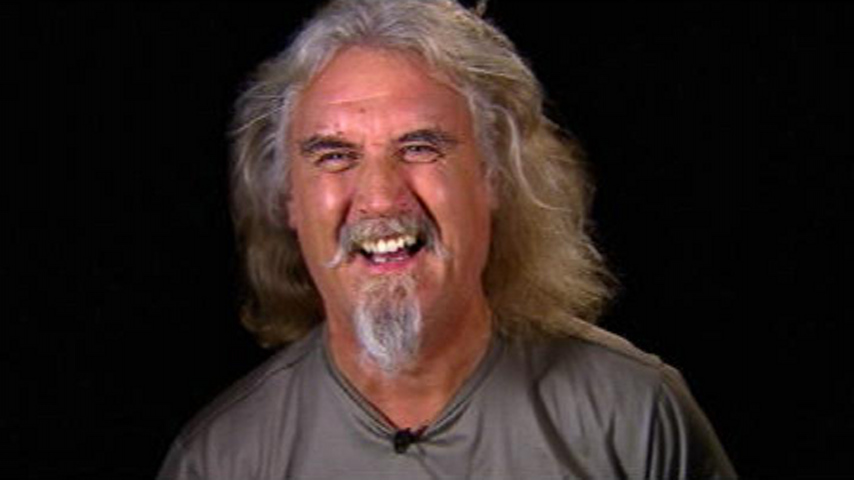
Billy Connolly reflects in the film on the versatility of the word and its ability to communicate across languages.

Scholarly analysis is provided by Maledicta publisher Reinhold Aman, journalism analyst David Shaw and Oxford English Dictionary editor Jesse Sheidlower. Language professor Geoffrey Nunberg says, "You could think of that [word] as standing in for most of the changes that happened in the 20th century, at least many of the important ones".

The film next features author Hunter S. Thompson in his final documented interview. Fuck later includes archival footage of comedians Lenny Bruce and George Carlin, and analysis of the word's use in popular culture, from MASH (1970) to Scarface (1983) and Clerks (1994). Carlin's 1972 monolog "Seven Words You Can Never Say on Television" is excerpted in the film. Journalist Sam Donaldson comments on the versatility of "fuck": "It's one of those all-purpose words." Bill Maher comments, "It's the ultimate bad word", observing that thanks to Lenny Bruce, comedy clubs have become "the freest free-speech zone" in the United States.

Connolly states that "fuck" "sounds exactly like what it is", noting that the emotional impact of saying "fuck off" cannot be translated. He says that if a person is in Lhasa Gonggar Airport and someone is fiddling with their luggage, yelling "fuck off" will effectively communicate that they should stop and leave. Morissette says, "The f-word is special. Everybody uses the word 'breakfast', but not everyone feels comfortable using the word 'fuck' so there's an extra power behind it." Boone argues for less use of the word, saying that he uses his surname instead. Radio talk show host Dennis Prager says that it is acceptable for youths to hear the word on television and film, but not from their family members. In the film, opponents of the word "fuck" use an argument commonly known as "Think of the children". (Note: "Think of the children" is a rhetorical device used by those who wish to cast youth as victims to win a political argument.)

Fuck observes that the original use of the word is unknown to scholars, noting that its earliest written appearance was in the 1475 poem "Flen flyys". It was not, as is often claimed, originally an acronym for "For Unlawful Carnal Knowledge" or "Fornication Under Consent of the King". The word has been used by authors including Robert Burns, D. H. Lawrence (in his 1928 Lady Chatterley's Lover) and James Joyce. The film explains that "fuck" established its current usage during the First and Second World Wars, and was used by General George S. Patton in a speech to his forces who were about to enter France.

Fuck states that the first use of the word in a large-studio film was in M*A*S*H (1970), and it entered the Oxford English Dictionary in 1972. That year, the word was also recorded during the Apollo 16 United States mission to land on the Moon. The film includes a segment from the 1987 film Planes, Trains and Automobiles with actor Steve Martin, in which "fuck" is repeated for comedic effect. Fuck states that the most financially successful live action comedy film to date had the suggestive title of Meet the Fockers (2004). The director analyzes the uses and connotations of "fuck" and the feelings it evokes on several levels. Bruce is quoted as saying, "If you can't say 'fuck', you can't say 'fuck the government'". Steve Anderson argues that "fuck" is an integral part of societal discussions about freedom of speech and censorship.

== Soundtrack ==
Fuck includes songs with similarly themed titles, including "Shut Up and Fuck" by American hard rock band Betty Blowtorch, "Fucking Fucking Fuck" by Splatpattern and "I Love to Say Fuck" by American horror punk supergroup Murderdolls. Journalist Sam Peczek of Culture Wars compared the film's music to that in softcore pornography and observed that the soundtrack was broad in scope and helped accentuate the film's content.

=== Track listing ===
Fuck (2005) by Steve Anderson
| No. | Title | Writer(s) | Length |
|---|---|---|---|
| 1. | "All Things Bright and Beautiful" (Susan Skup, vocalist) | Anglican hymn |
| 2. | "Hot Dog Man" (Antony W. Lee, vocalist) | Carvin Knowles |
| 3. | "Don't Fuck with My Freedom of Speech" (Patrick Delaney and Steve Anderson, vocalists) | Carvin Knowles |
| 4. | "Vendetta" (performed by Carvin Knowles, Joel Kleinberg and David Uebersax) | Carvin Knowles |
| 5. | "If I Had The Copyright (The F-Word Song)" (performed by Carla Ulbrich) | Carla Ulbrich |
| 6. | "Porn King" (performed by The Funky Filter) | Dany Almeida |
| 7. | "Revolution Starts Now" (performed by Steve Earle) | Steve Earle |
| 8. | "I Can't Say These Things" (performed by Red Peters) | Ed Grenga, Arthur Johnson, Michael McMahon and Douglas Stevens |
| 9. | "Shut Up and Fuck" (performed by Betty Blowtorch) | Bianca Butthole, Sharon Needles, Blare N. Bitch and Judy Molish |
| 10. | "Fucking Fucking Fuck" (performed by Splatpattern) | Walter Fischbacher, Elizabeth Lohninger, and Pete Macnamara |
| 11. | "Chicken Rhythm" (performed by Slim Gaillard) | Bulee Gaillard and Harry Squires |
| 12. | "A Chat With Your Mother" (performed by Cathy Fink and Marcy Marxer) | Lou and Peter Berryman |
| 13. | "Don't Fuck Around With Love" (performed by The Blenders) | Claude DeMetrius and Joseph W. Burns |
| 14. | "Hallelujah Chorus" (courtesy of DeWolfe Music Library) | George Frideric Handel |
| 15. | "Bad Word for a Good Thing" (performed by The Friggs) | Dean Roher and Ben Vaughn |
| 16. | "Fuck tha Police" (performed by NWA) | O'Shea Jackson, Andre Young, and Lorenzo Patterson |
| 17. | "Surfin' Bird" (performed by The Trashmen) | Al Frazier, Sonny Harris, Carl White, and Turner Wilson |
| 18. | "I Love To Say Fuck" (performed by Murderdolls) | Joey Jordison |
| 19. | "F The CC" (performed by Steve Earle) | Steve Earle |
| 20. | "The Closing Song" (performed by Red Peters) | Joseph Vercillo, Ed grenga, Douglas Stevens and Arthur Johnson |
| 21. | "Love Muscle" (performed by The SEX-O-RAMA Band) | Carvin Knowles |
| 22. | "Stiffed" (performed by The SEX-O-RAMA Band) | Carvin Knowles |

== Production ==
=== Inspiration ===
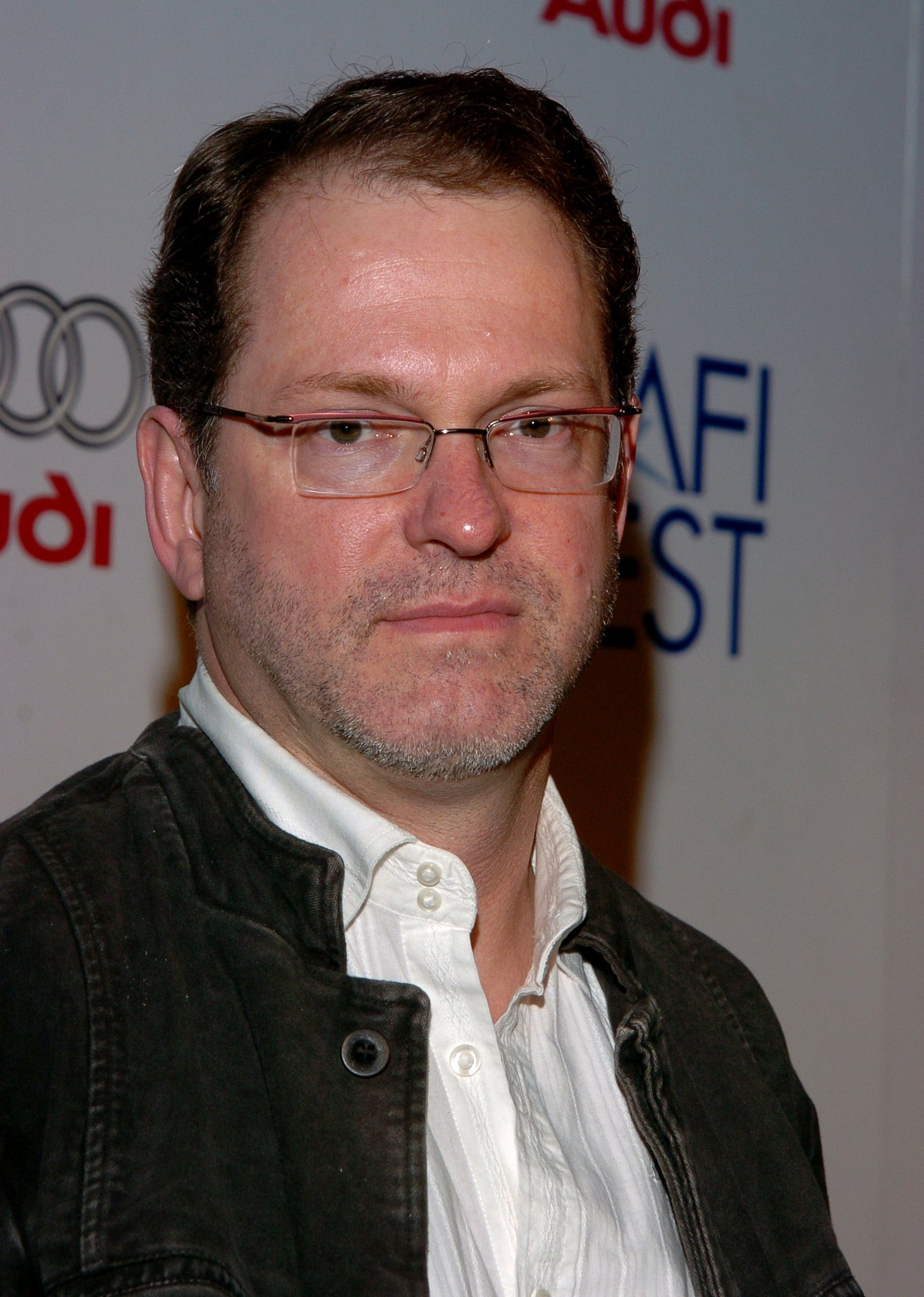
Steve Anderson decided to research the film's topic due to the word's versatility and his interest in language use as a writer.

Anderson made his directorial debut in 2003 with the film The Big Empty, starring actors Daryl Hannah and Jon Favreau, and became fascinated by the usage of the word "fuck". In an interview with the Democrat and Chronicle, Anderson suggested he cursed a lot more than he used to after the film's production. He decided to research the film's topic due to the word's versatility and his interest in language as a writer. Early exposure by Anderson to public perception of the word "fuck" came from Class Clown by comedian George Carlin, which included his monolog "Seven Words You Can Never Say on Television".

The director explained in an interview that he was fascinated with the word "fuck" because of its different uses. He originally proposed the idea of a film about the word in jest, later realizing that the topic could fuel a documentary. The Observer quoted him as saying that he was entertained by the word "fuck", and intrigued with the idea of examining how the word had been incorporated into popular culture. He wanted to analyze why some people were offended by its use and others enjoyed it, noting that the word sharpened debate about taboo language in society.

Anderson explained to the Los Angeles Times the confusing, forbidden nature of the word "fuck" in the face of the increased pervasiveness of euphemisms for it. He commented on its taboo nature and demonstrated how it can be indirectly referred to, so youth understand the reference without using the word itself. In an interview with the South China Morning Post, Anderson said that film directors should fight against censorship, because it can block their true message.

The director told CanWest News Service that he hoped the documentary would provoke a wider discussion about freedom of speech, sexual slang and its media use. Anderson questioned whether the word should be used on NYPD Blue, and how parents should discuss its use with their children. He emphasized that artists and filmmakers should be free to express their views without censorship, deferring to public opinion on the appropriateness of his documentary's title.

Anderson stated in an interview with IndieWire that freedom of speech was not guaranteed, but a concept requiring discussion and monitoring, so it is not lost. He classified the word "fuck" as being at the core of discussion about freedom of speech. He acknowledged that there are terms considered by society more vulgar than "fuck", but said that this particular word creates controversy and dialogue. Anderson said that its title alone distinguished his documentary from others, in terms of promotional difficulty. During production, Fuck was known as The Untitled F-Word Film.

=== Title and marketing ===
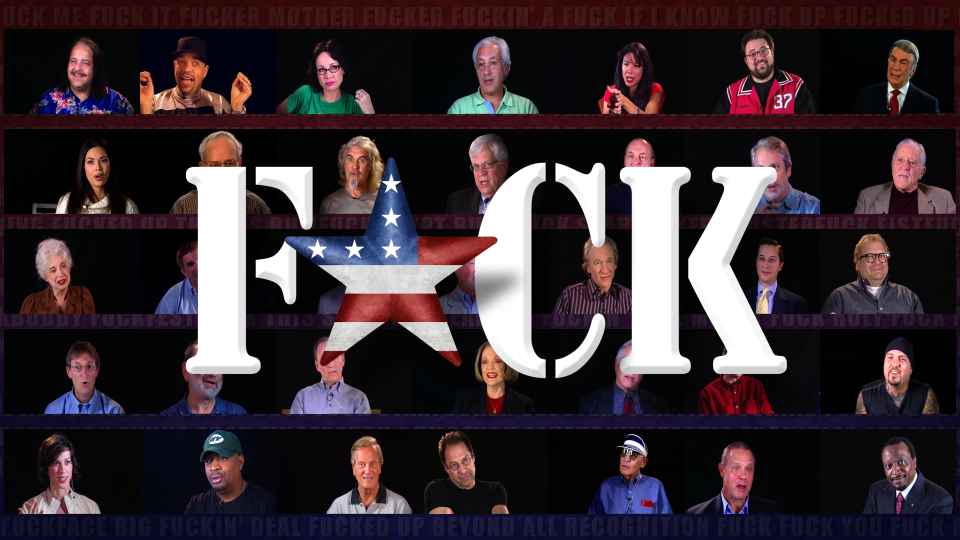
Steve Anderson said that the title of his film was Fuck, but he allowed marketing designs with an asterisk.

In an interview about the film on his website, Anderson discussed problems he encountered in naming his film Fuck instead of a censored version of the word. Anderson always wanted to call it Fuck, because it succinctly described the film's contents. (Note: Fuck is styled as FUCK, F★CK, or F*CK and alternatively referred to as Fuck: A Documentary and The F-Bomb: A Documentary.) There were inherent problems with this approach, including an inability to advertise the true title in mainstream media such as The New York Times and Los Angeles Times (they used four asterisks instead), although the real title might be permitted in alternative newspapers such as LA Weekly. Anderson also anticipated problems displaying the film's title during film festivals on theater marquees.

Anderson explained that although the title of his documentary was Fuck, he allowed alternate designations using an asterisk. The film and content he controlled would refer to the title as Fuck, including theatrical and DVD editions. He concluded that his struggle reflected the debate alluded to by the documentary, and this realization motivated him to stand firm on the film's title. Because the film is about how a taboo word can impact culture, it was important to keep Fuck as its title.

=== Filming and distribution ===
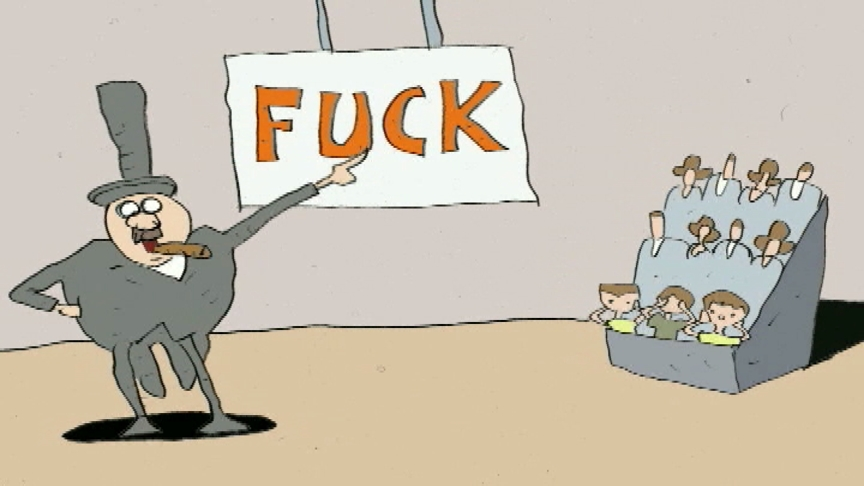
The film uses animation by Bill Plympton to illustrate key concepts.

The film features animation by American graphic designer and cartoonist Bill Plympton. To illustrate key concepts, Fuck uses sound bites, music, video clips and archival film footage; Anderson combined excerpts from five television series and twenty-two films in the documentary. The interviews were cut so that different subjects appear to be talking to each other; the interviewees in question generally had opposite views on the subject. The film was unrated by the Motion Picture Association of America.

Rainstorm Entertainment was confirmed in November 2003 to produce and finance the documentary, with production scheduled to begin in January 2004. The film was completed in 2005 by Anderson's company, Mudflap Films, and produced by Rainstorm Entertainment co-founders Steven Kaplan and Gregg Daniel, and Bruce Leiserowitz, Jory Weitz and Richard Ardi. Financial assistance was provided by Bad Apple Films of Spokane, Washington.

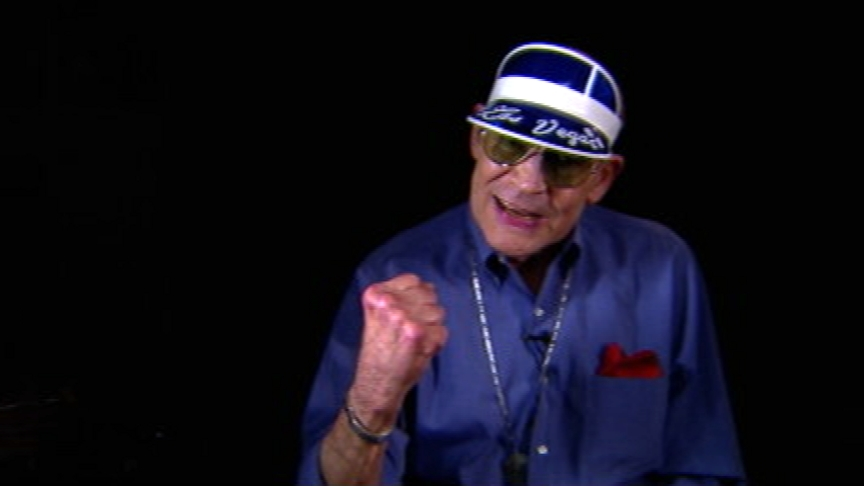
The documentary featured the last interview with author Hunter S. Thompson before his suicide and honored Thompson's contributions to journalism.

Thirty-five media commentators were interviewed for the film. Jory Weitz helped obtain interviews; he had cast Anderson's previous film, The Big Empty, and had industry credibility as executive producer of Napoleon Dynamite. Anderson said he intended to select interviewees with a variety of perspectives, conservative as well as liberal. He described how, as confirmations of interview subjects came in, he was surprised when Pat Boone was among the first to confirm his participation. Anderson had previously worked as a cameraman on a piece with Boone about eight years before starting work on Fuck. After confirming Boone, Bill Maher and Janeane Garofalo on Fuck, it became easier for Anderson to confirm other interviewees. The film included the final video interview with Hunter S. Thompson before his suicide, and Anderson dedicated it to Thompson for his contributions to journalism.

Distribution rights to Fuck were obtained by THINKFilm in 2006. Movie chains did not use the film's title in their promotion, instead using references such as The Four-Letter Word Film. Mark Urman, chief of the theatrical division of THINKFilm, told The Philadelphia Inquirer that it was especially difficult (as an independent film distributor) to promote a film with a title media outlets did not wish to print. Urman told Variety that the intent of the production staff during promotion was a creative, original marketing campaign. THINKFilm marketed the documentary as a comprehensive, humorous look at the dichotomy between the taboo nature and cultural universality of the word "fuck".

== Reception ==
=== Release ===
Fuck was shown for the first time on November 7, 2005, at the American Film Institute Film Festival at the ArcLight Hollywood on Sunset Boulevard in Hollywood, California. On March 10, 2006, interest increased after the opening night of the 20th South by Southwest Film Festival in Austin, Texas. At the 30th Cleveland International Film Festival, it sold out two screenings (which were standing-room only events).

Fuck was featured on March 31 and April 2, 2006, at the Florida Film Festival. It was screened in April 2006 during the Philadelphia Film Festival at Prince Music Theater in Philadelphia. It had its Washington, D.C. premiere in June 2006, and was shown on June 15 at the Nantucket Film Festival.

Fuck opened in Los Angeles on August 23, 2006, and in New York on November 10. It made its Canadian debut at the 2006 Hot Docs Canadian International Documentary Festival, and began regular showings at the Bloor Cinema on December 1. The documentary began screening at the Century Centre Cinema in Chicago on November 17, 2006. Fuck had two screenings in April 2007 during the Hong Kong International Film Festival in Tsim Sha Tsui. According to a 2011 interview with Anderson in the Santa Barbara Independent, the documentary was shown in about 100 film festivals worldwide and was screened in about 65 cities during its theatrical release.

=== Critical response ===
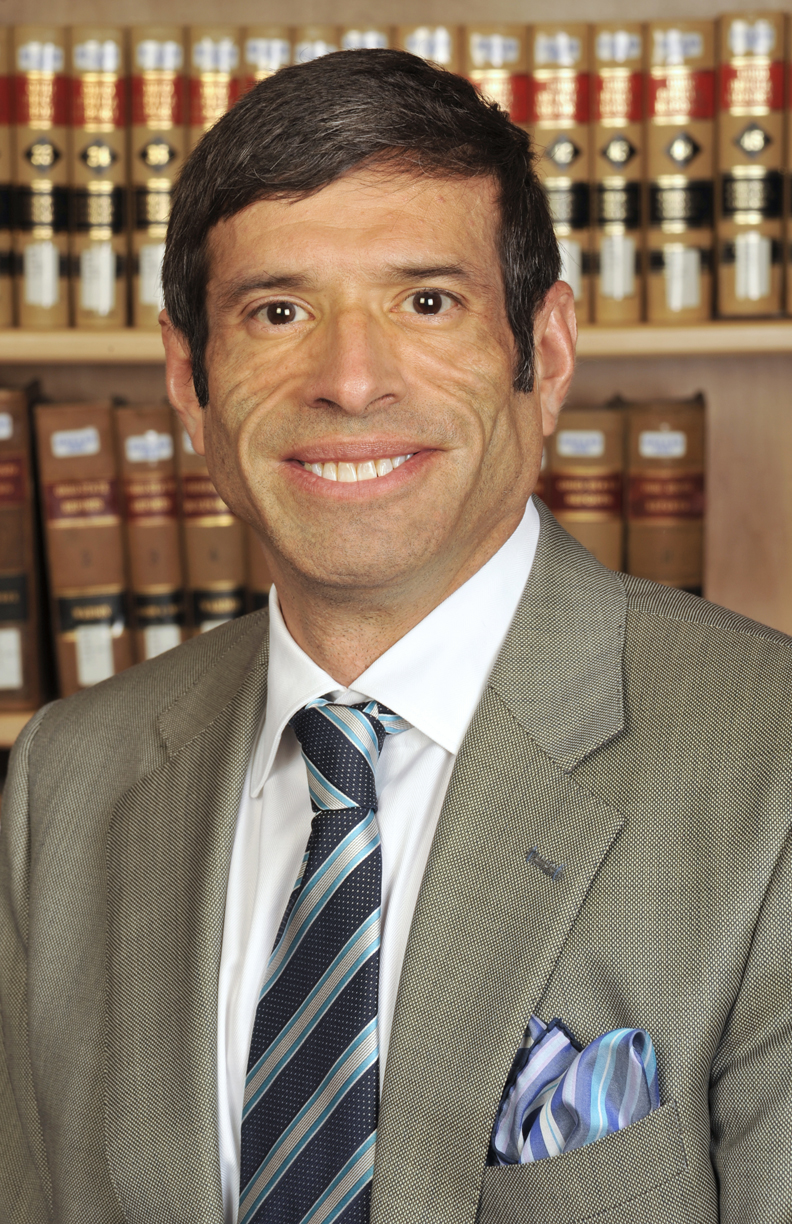
In his book Fuck: Word Taboo and Protecting Our First Amendment Liberties, Christopher M. Fairman of the Moritz College of Law at Ohio State University called the documentary "the most important film using 'fuck'".

Fuck received mixed reviews. The review aggregator website Rotten Tomatoes reported a 56% approval rating with an average rating of 5.8/10 based on 72 reviews. The website's consensus reads, "A documentary that sets out to explore a lingual taboo but can't escape its own naughty posturing." At Metacritic, which assigns a weighted-mean rating from 0–100 based on reviews by film critics, the film has a rating score of 58 based on 23 reviews (a mixed, or average, film). The American Film Institute wrote, "Ultimately, Fuck is a movie about free speech ... Freedom of expression must extend to words that offend. Love it or hate it, fuck is here to stay".

Jack Garner of the Democrat and Chronicle gave the film a rating of 8 out of 10, concluding that he was pleasantly surprised at the documentary's entertainment value. He described it as educational, despite Fuck's repetitive use of the word. In The Boston Globe Wesley Morris commented that the director's flippant style was beneficial, enabling him to make serious educational points to the audience. Sally Foster of Film Threat said that the crux of the film was the debate about freedom of speech, and that the film was funny and thought-provoking. A. O. Scott wrote in The New York Times: "Mr. Anderson's movie is staged as a talking-head culture-war skirmish between embattled upholders of propriety (or repression, if you prefer) and proponents of free expression (or filth), but its real lesson is that the two sides depend upon each other. Or rather, that the continued vitality of the word—its unique ability to convey emphasis, relieve stress, shock grown-ups and function as adverb, noun, verb, intensifier and what linguists call 'infix'—rests on its ability to mark an edge between the permissible and the profane". In the Chicago Reader, Jonathan Rosenbaum wrote that the documentary was an amusing film and an educational commentary on the word. According to Glenn Garvin of The Miami Herald, the film was an expansive merging of perspectives from politics, history and culture.

In a review for The Austin Chronicle Marjorie Baumgarten gave the film a rating of 4.5 out of five stars, concluding that it helped unravel myths surrounding the word and describing it as captivating and educational. Steve Schneider reviewed the film for the Orlando Weekly, comparing it to an academic thesis despite its repeated use of off-color humor. Noel Murray of The A.V. Club gave the film a grade of B-minus, stating that Fuck succeeded where Kirby Dick's This Film Is Not Yet Rated did not, by providing viewpoints from multiple perspectives. Karl French wrote in a review for the Financial Times that the documentary was unique and reasonably entertaining. Moira MacDonald asked, in a review for The Seattle Times, if viewers could embrace the First Amendment to the United States Constitution and still be leery of the word's omnipresence in society. Mick LaSalle wrote in the San Francisco Chronicle that the commentators seemed monotonous and formulaic in debating freedom of speech, and criticized the film's repetition of the word "fuck".

Peter Keough reviewed the film for the Boston Phoenix; giving it a rating of two out of four stars, he also said that the repeated use of "fuck" grew tiresome. In a critical review for The Observer Philip French wrote that the film had low comedic value, calling it arrogant, puerile and tedious. Peter Bradshaw of The Guardian gave the film two out of five stars, criticizing its lack of originality. In a review for Empire magazine, David Parkinson also gave the film a rating of two out of five stars and was frustrated that arguments by the director seemed guarded; he said that the film's scope was not comedic, amusing or provoking enough. In Time Out London David Jenkins gave the film one star out of six, writing that it lacked depth on the issues of linguistics, media, and censorship. A critical review by Noah Sanders of The Stranger concluded that the film was watchable and amusing, but poorly edited and organized. The St. Paul Pioneer Press criticized the film's length, which was echoed by The Washington Post, the Deseret News, The Herald and the New York Daily News. In a review for the Seattle Post-Intelligencer Bill White gave the film a grade C, calling it a dull compilation of childish observations and a failed attempt to spark a discussion about freedom of speech. Mike Pinsky of DVD Verdict concluded that the film's main arguments were achieved by the beginning of the documentary, and criticized its lack of subsequent structure and light tone overall.

=== Home media ===
THINKFilm reached an agreement to screen the documentary on the American premium cable channel Showtime in 2007, and it aired on the Documentary Channel on May 28, 2011. The DVD for Fuck was released by THINKFilm on February 13, 2007, and a United Kingdom DVD edition was released in 2009. For the DVDs, THINKFilm remastered the video for Fuck; it was optimized for home viewing with 1.85:1 anamorphic widescreen transfer to a 16:9 anamorphic full-frame presentation and Dolby Digital Stereo 2.0 audio.

Trailers for Shortbus, Farce of the Penguins and The Aristocrats appear on the DVD before the documentary. Special features include a commentary track by Steve Anderson, interviews with Anderson and Bill Plympton, the film's theatrical trailer, a gallery for the introductory trailers, deleted scenes and interviews with Hunter S. Thompson and Tera Patrick. The disc includes an optional on-screen counter, giving viewers a running total of utterances (and appearances) of the word "fuck" during play. (Note: The on-screen counter tracks uses of "fuck" throughout the film in aggregate over time, starting from the beginning of the film.)

=== Impact ===
Fuck has been a resource for several university courses. (Note: The film was recommended as a resource to students by Dr. Richard Stepp in his Fall 2007 course "Ethnographic and Documentary Film" at the University of Florida.) (Note: See additional research by Miriam Sobre-Denton of Southern Illinois University Carbondale and Jana Simonis published in the academic journal Communication Teacher.) Christopher M. Fairman discussed the documentary in his article, "Fuck", published in February 2007 in the Cardozo Law Review. Fairman cited Anderson's decision to call his film Fuck and the marketing problems this entailed, saying that he and Anderson both found the title of their works helped spur debate on word taboos in society.

In an interview with the Santa Barbara Independent, Anderson said that a schoolteacher in Philadelphia had been fired for showing the documentary to his students. The teacher had researched the documentary, and wanted to teach his students the history of the word because of its frequent use in his class. Anderson said it was not the use of the word "fuck" in the film that cost the teacher his job, but a 38-second scene from a Fuck for Forest concert in Europe where a couple engaged in sexual intercourse onstage as environmental advocacy. The teacher showed the DVD to his 11th-grade journalism class at William Penn High School without previewing it or sending permission slips home to parents. He told the Philadelphia Daily News that before showing the documentary, he was unaware that it contained the clip showing sexual intercourse. He was dismissed from his position by the school principal, and his termination was upheld by the regional superintendent. The teacher did not appeal the decision, instead retiring. An analysis of the incident by the Philadelphia Daily News concluded that the school district's decision to fire the teacher was appropriate, but also agreed with the teacher's position that showing a 90-minute DVD should not have obliterated his 19 years as an educator.

Fuck was featured in a 2012 analysis in the academic journal Communication Teacher, "Do You Talk to Your Teacher with That Mouth? F*ck: A Documentary and Profanity as a Teaching Tool in the Communication Classroom", by Miriam Sobre-Denton of Southern Illinois University Carbondale and Jana Simonis. Sobre-Denton and Simonis discussed the documentary's use for communication studies students studying university-level intercultural relations. Their research incorporated interviews with Steve Anderson, students and data from graduate-level classes in language and culture. Sobre-Denton and Simonis' conclusions correlated taboo words with social forms of power, rebelliousness, professionalism and gender roles.

== See also ==
- Censorship in the United States
- Cohen v. California
- Freedom of speech in the United States
- List of films that most frequently use the word fuck
- Madonna on Late Show with David Letterman
