= Fuck: Word Taboo and Protecting Our First Amendment Liberties =

Nonfiction book by law professor Christopher M. Fairman

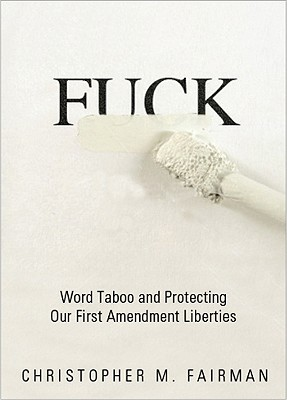
- Cover of 2009 edition
- Author: Christopher M. Fairman
- Cover artist: Cyanotype Book Architects
- Language: English
- Subject: Freedom of speech
- Publisher: Sphinx Publishing
- Publication date: 2009
- Publication place: United States
- Pages: 250
- ISBN: 978-1-57248-711-6
- OCLC: 262433445
- Dewey Decimal: 342.7308/53
- LC Class: KF9444 .F35 2009

Fuck: Word Taboo and Protecting Our First Amendment Liberties is a nonfiction book by law professor Christopher M. Fairman about freedom of speech, the First Amendment to the United States Constitution, censorship, and use of the word fuck in society. The book was first published in 2009 by Sphinx as a follow-up on the author's article "Fuck", published in 2007 in the Cardozo Law Review. It cites studies from academics in social science, psychoanalysis, and linguistics. Fairman establishes that most current usages of the word have connotations distinct from its meaning of sexual intercourse. The book discusses the efforts of conservatives in the United States to censor the word from common parlance. The author says that legal precedent regarding its use is unclear because of contradictory court decisions. Fairman argues that once citizens allow the government to restrict the use of specific words, this will infringe upon freedom of thought.

The book received a mostly favorable reception from news sources and library trade publications. Library Journal described the book as a sincere analysis of the word and its history of censorship, Choice: Current Reviews for Academic Libraries called it stimulating, and the San Diego Law Review said it was thought-provoking. One reviewer said that the book, like the article, was a format for the author to repeatedly use "fuck" rather than analyze it from a rigorous perspective. After the book's release, Fairman was consulted by media sources including CNN and The New York Times, as well as the American Civil Liberties Union, on issues surrounding word taboo in society.

== Background ==
Christopher M. Fairman graduated from the University of Texas at Austin. He taught high-school-level history for nine years before returning to his alma mater, where he ultimately received his Juris Doctor degree. He worked as a clerk on the Texas Court of Appeals for the Third District for Justice J. Woodfin Jones. Subsequently, he was a clerk on the U.S. Court of Appeals for the Fifth Circuit for Judge Fortunato Benavides, and worked for the law firm Weil Gotshal in their office in Dallas. Fairman became a professor at Ohio State University's Moritz College of Law in 2000. He specialized in areas of freedom of speech and word taboo, and earned a reputation as an expert on the subject of legal ethics.

Fairman was motivated to conduct research on "fuck" after learning of a Columbus, Ohio, man who was arrested for using the word in an email to a judge in 2004. Fairman delayed writing the article until he received tenure because he was concerned its publication would adversely affect his professional reputation. Nevertheless, his supervisors did not try to convince him to cease research into the topic. Government funding helped finance Fairman's scholarship.

His original 2006 article "Fuck" is an analysis of forbidden speech from linguistic and legal perspectives. It covers use of the word in case studies about sexual harassment and education. The article is 74 pages long, and the word fuck appears over 560 times. According to author Jesse Sheidlower in his book The F-Word, Fairman's work is the first academic article with the title of simply "Fuck".

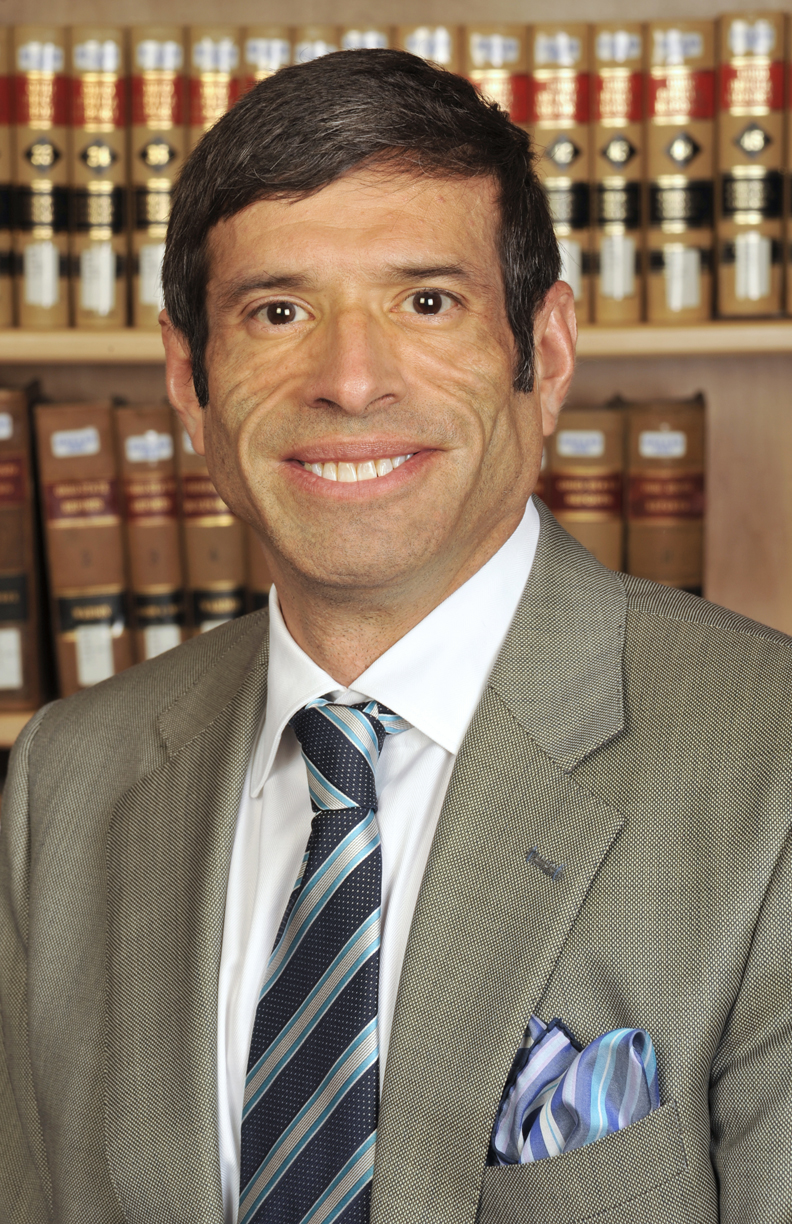
Professor Christopher M. Fairman of the Moritz College of Law at Ohio State University (2008)

Fairman made his article available as a working paper on the Social Science Research Network website on April 17, 2006. Initially the author unsuccessfully tried to have the article published by providing copies to multiple U.S. law reviews. The Kansas Law Review rejected his article 25 minutes after receipt. It was published by the Cardozo Law Review in 2007. The author wrote a follow-up piece in April 2007 titled "Fuck and Law Faculty Rankings". Fairman died on July 22, 2015. At the time of his death, Fairman's 2007 Cardozo Law Review article, "Fuck" was still classed with the 20 top downloaded works on the Social Science Research Network.

== Content summary ==
Fuck cites studies from academics in social science, psychoanalysis, and linguistics. Of the sixteen chapters in the book, eight use the word "fuck" in their titles. He discusses uses of the word from the 15th century onwards. Fairman establishes that most current usages have connotations distinct from its denotation of sexual intercourse, and asserts that rather than having sexual meaning, the word's use is most commonly associated with power.

Fairman discusses the efforts of conservatives in the United States to censor the word from common parlance in the country and says these acts are opposed to the First Amendment to the United States Constitution. Fairman warns against a tendency toward self-censorship. He explains that those who choose to silence themselves tacitly encourage a process by which speech is forbidden through the legal process. He argues that this passivity has an impact of increasing the taboo nature of the word.

Fairman writes that legal precedent regarding using the word is unclear because of contradictory court decisions. He presents case studies of these conflicting applications of the law and uses them to analyze public perceptions surrounding freedom of speech. He provides examples of exceptions to the First Amendment, such as speech intended to cause violent acts, and discusses how federal and state governments sanction these exceptions. Fairman draws parallels between the protection of comedians' usage of taboo language and the ability of individuals in society to express ideas freely. He argues that once citizens allow the government to restrict specific words that can be used in speech, this will infringe upon freedom of thought.

== Reception ==
Fuck: Word Taboo and Protecting Our First Amendment Liberties was first published in 2009 in paperback by Sphinx Publishing, and in an electronic format for the Amazon Kindle the same year. The Seattle Post-Intelligencer called Fairman's paper compelling and amusing. The Horn Book Magazine described the paper as a contemplative scholarly work which was simultaneously an engaging read. In a 2011 article for the Federal Communications Law Journal, W. Wat Hopkins was critical of Fairman's article and subsequent book, writing that both appeared to be formats for the author to repeatedly use the word "fuck", rather than analyze the subject from a rigorous perspective.

A review of the book in Publishers Weekly called it a vibrant extension of his article. It described it as educational and assertive in promoting freedom of speech, particularly in the face of the controversial language discussed. Choice: Current Reviews for Academic Libraries reviewed Fuck and called it a stimulating book. The review concluded, "[h]ighly recommended. All readership levels."

Library Journal described the book as a sincere analysis of "fuck" and its history of censorship. The review characterized the book as of a higher quality than The Compleat Motherfucker: A History of the Mother of all Dirty Words (2009) by Jim Dawson. Ian Crouch of The New Yorker praised the cover design for the book. Crouch observed that the word Fuck was shown partially obscured by correction fluid but was still clearly evident in full. He concluded this was an appropriate image for a book on free speech and word taboos.

After the book's publication, Fairman was consulted by media sources, including CNN, on issues involving word taboo. The American Civil Liberties Union of Ohio invited Fairman to host its forum "Word Taboos" in 2010; his presentation was titled "Putting the 'F' in Free Speech". In a 2012 article on the word "fuck", The New York Times characterized Fairman as the foremost legal scholar in the United States on the word "fuck".

== See also ==
- Censorship in the United States
- Cohen v. California
- Freedom of speech in the United States
- Fuck (documentary about the word)
- Seven dirty words
- Political correctness
