= The F Book =

The F Book may refer to:

== Internet ==
- Thefacebook, now known simply as "Facebook"

== Literature ==
- The F-Word (book), a book first published in 1995
