= Carla Ulbrich =

American singer-songwriter

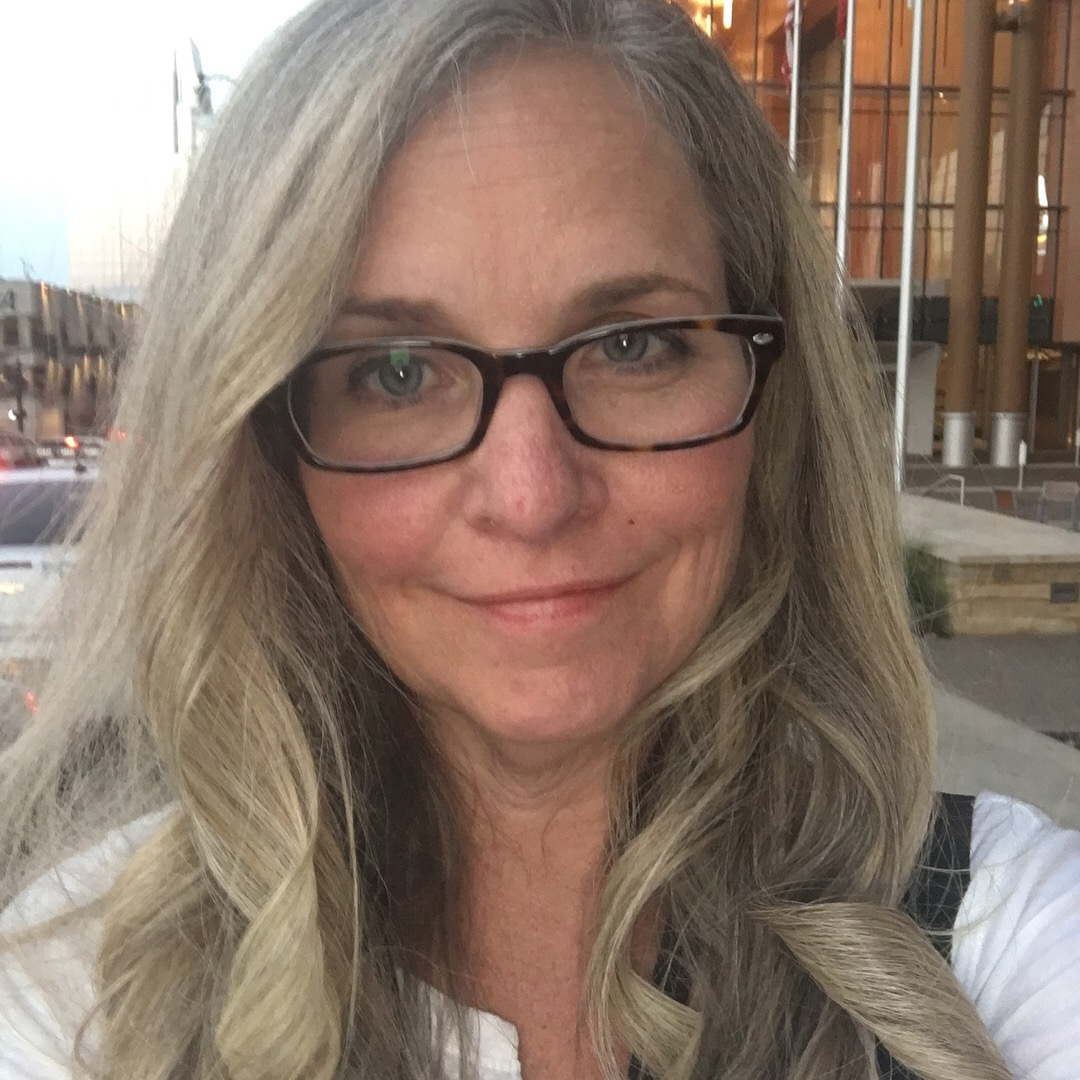

Background information
- Origin: Clemson, South Carolina
- Occupation(s): Singer-songwriter, author
- Instrument(s): Singing, guitar
- Labels: Romantic Devil Records, Official Seal Records
- Website: http://www.carlau.com

Carla Ulbrich is an American singer-songwriter, guitarist, author, and self-described "professional smart aleck" from Clemson, South Carolina.

== Career ==
Humorous songwriter Carla Ulbrich started out at age 9 as a classical guitarist, inspired by her aunt, Pat Brothwell, who was pursuing a degree in classical guitar at the time. Ulbrich started writing songs in college (when she was supposed to be practicing "real" music).

Despite the distractions, Ulbrich received an AFA in music from Brevard College and a BA in Music from UNC-Greensboro. Having many parody or novelty songs in her repertoire (such as "Duet with a Klingon" based on "Let's Call the Whole Thing Off", with a Klingon taking the male lead), she has regularly been on the Dr. Demento Radio Show and SiriusXM Comedy radio, and has also appeared on USA, WGN, WVIA and PAX TV, the BBC, and NPR's Weekend Edition.

She has won numerous songwriting awards, including "Novelty Song of the Year" in 2006 from the Just Plain Folks awards for her piece "What If Your Butt was Gone?", a rewrite of her earlier song "What If Your Girlfriend was Gone?"

Many of her pieces are of a humorous nature, reflecting on human life. She has written songs about unappreciated elements, such as "The Guy Who Changes the Lightbulbs (Changes Everything)", "Nothing to Say", "Prednisone", and "The Wedgie".

Her 2004 album Sick Humor deals with Ulbrich's recovery from strokes and kidney failure she suffered in 2002. This collection of songs has led to appearances at medical conferences.

Her song "If I Had the Copyright" was featured in the 2006 documentary Fuck, directed by Steve Anderson.

Since 1999, Ulbrich has performed in England, Canada, and much of the US (including Alaska). She has appeared at the Bluebird Cafe, Eddie's Attic, the Falcon Ridge Folk Festival, Florida Folk Festival, South Florida Folk Festival, Wildflower! Arts and Music Festival, Kerrville Folk Festival, Avalon Nude Folk Festival, DragonCon, MarsCon, FenCon (and numerous other science fiction and/or filk conventions), various colleges, a few comedy clubs, private and corporate parties, nursing, patient and caregiver conventions, a few weddings, and the Chet Atkins Appreciation Society Convention.

Ulbrich has taught guitar at 3 colleges, 3 music stores, and her own private teaching studio, as well as Hummingbird Music Camp and the National Guitar Summer Workshop. Her music instruction book Notespeller was published by Alfred Knopf in 2001. She has a number of instructional guitar videos on YouTube.

Ulbrich also wrote a book of humorous essays on recovering health after a catastrophic illness titled How Can You *Not* Laugh at a Time Like This?. The book was released by Tell Me Press on February 1, 2011.

== Discography ==
- Twang, 2022
- Inside Jokes: Songs from Quarantine, 2020
- The Loud Album, 2020
- Live at FuMPFest, 2019
- Totally Average Woman, 2015
- Live From Outer Space, 2009
- Leftovers, 2009
- Sick Humor, 2004
- Professional Smart Aleck, 2003
- If I Had the Copyright (The F Word Song), single, 2002
- Her Fabulous Debut, 2000
