= La Femme Nikita (TV series) =

1997 Canadian action-drama television series

- Also known as: Nikita
- Genre: Action; Drama; Spy fiction
- Based on: Nikita by Luc Besson
- Developed by: Joel Surnow and Robert Cochran
- Starring: Peta Wilson; Roy Dupuis; Matthew Ferguson; Don Francks; Eugene Robert Glazer; Alberta Watson
- Theme music composer: Mark Snow
- Composer: Sean Callery
- Countries of origin: Canada; United States
- Original language: English
- No. of seasons: 5
- No. of episodes: 96 (list of episodes)

Production
- Executive producers: Jay Firestone; Rocco Matteo
- Producer: Jamie Paul Rock
- Camera setup: Single-camera
- Running time: 45–48 minutes
- Production companies: Baton Broadcasting; LFN Productions, Inc.; Fireworks Entertainment; Warner Bros. Television

Original release
- Network: CTV (Canada); USA Network (United States)
- Release: January 13, 1997 – March 4, 2001

Related
- Nikita (2010–2013)

La Femme Nikita (French pronunciation: [la fam nikita], literally "The Woman Nikita"; called Nikita in Canada) is a Canadian action-drama television series based on the French film of the same name by Luc Besson. The series stars Peta Wilson as the titular character. It was co-produced by Jay Firestone of Fireworks Entertainment and Warner Bros. Domestic Television Distribution. It was created and adapted for television by Joel Surnow and Robert Cochran. The series was telecast in the United States on the USA Network cable channel on Monday, January 13, 1997 at 10pm, and ran for five seasons until March 4, 2001. The series was also aired in Canada on the over-the-air CTV Television Network. La Femme Nikita was the highest-rated drama on American basic cable during its first two seasons. It was also distributed in some other countries.

== Comparison with the film ==
In the 1990 original Luc Besson film—and in the 1993 American remake Point of No Return (also released as The Assassin), by Warner Bros.—Nikita is a drug-addicted juvenile delinquent who kills a police officer in cold blood during an attempted robbery of a pharmacy. She is later arrested and sentenced to life imprisonment in Nikita, and to death by lethal injection in Point of No Return, upon which she was secretly drugged by the government, faking her death. Nikita is then "recruited" by a secret government organization and transformed into a highly skilled assassin who cannot be traced.

The television series differs from the film versions in one fundamental aspect: Nikita (Peta Wilson) is innocent. She is not a killer, nor a drug user, just a homeless young woman in the wrong place at the wrong time. Section One—an elite, top-secret counter-terrorism organization—sets Nikita up to be accused of murdering a police officer and sentenced to life in prison where she supposedly commits suicide and is brought into Section One. Because Nikita will be killed (or "cancelled") if she fails to comply, she is forced to carry out the organization's ruthless methods of fighting terrorism, while attempting to keep her moral integrity intact. This personal struggle becomes the primary conflict of the series. A key scene in the two theatrical films involves Nikita's first assignment—to murder a VIP in a crowded restaurant. Although the Nikita of the television series eventually does become, by necessity, a ruthless killer, in the television version of this first mission she avoids killing the VIP (whereas the film versions of the character complete the assignment). However, despite the machinations of others in power around her, Nikita retains her compassion and humanity.

Over time, Nikita's secretive and risky romantic involvement with her trainer, the mysterious Michael Samuelle (Roy Dupuis), will become another source of conflict, and the series' most significant relationship. Just before the conclusion of the series, Nikita also learns the truth of why she was recruited into Section One.

== Cast and characters ==
Characters are listed in order of title credit and by appearance on the show.

= Main cast (credited)
= Recurring cast (2+)
= Guest cast (1)

Actor	Character	Seasons				
Actor	Character	1	2	3	4	5
Main cast
Peta Wilson	Nikita	Main	Main	Main	Main	Main
Roy Dupuis	Michael Samuelle	Main	Main	Main	Main	Recurring
Don Francks	Walter	Main	Main	Main	Main	Main
Matthew Ferguson	Seymour Birkoff	Main	Main	Main	Main	
Eugene Robert Glazer	Operations (Paul Wolfe)	Main	Main	Main	Main	Main
Alberta Watson	Madeline	Main	Main	Main	Main	Guest
Cindy Dolenc	Katherine “Kate” Quinn				Recurring	Main
Recurring cast
Anais Granofsky	Carla	Recurring	Recurring			
Julian Richings	Errol Sparks	Guest		Guest		
Ingrid Veninger	Siobhan Lawrence	Guest		Guest		
Carlo Rota	Mick Schtoppel / "Mr. Jones" / Reginald “Martin” Henderson	Guest	Recurring	Recurring	Recurring	Recurring
Nigel Bennett	Egran Petrosian	Guest	Guest			
Douglas O’Keefe	David Fanning	Guest	Guest			
Yvonne Scio	Lisa Fanning	Guest	Guest			
Tara Slone	Gail	Guest	Recurring			
Lindsay Collins	Devo One (Elizabeth)	Guest	Guest	Recurring	Recurring	Guest
James Faulkner	Dominic	Guest		Guest		
Stephen Shellen	Marco O’Brien	Guest				Recurring
Bruce Payne	Jurgen		Recurring			
Jill Dyck	Belinda		Recurring			
Roman Podhora	Mowen		Recurring			
Kris Lemche	Greg Hillinger		Guest	Recurring	Guest	
Siân Phillips	Adrian		Recurring		Recurring	
David Hemblen	George			Recurring	Recurring	
Evan Caravela	Adam			Recurring	Recurring	Recurring
Samia Shoaib	Elena			Recurring	Recurring	
Josh Holliday	Devo Two (Henry)^{1}			Recurring	Recurring	Guest
Lawrence Bayne	Davenport			Guest	Recurring	
Matthew Ferguson	Jason Crawford				Recurring	Recurring
Larissa Gomes	Naomi Hill				Recurring	
Kira Clavell	Jasmine Kwong				Guest	Recurring
Polly Shannon	Michelle					Recurring
Edward Woodward	Mr. Jones (Philip) / "Flavius"					Recurring
Aidan Devine	Graff					Recurring
Conrad Coates	Haled					Recurring

Note

1. For the first two seasons, Devo Two was portrayed by two different uncredited extras.

=== Main ===
- Peta Wilson as Nikita: The show's central protagonist and titular character, Nikita was falsely accused of killing a police officer and sentenced to life in prison, only to be forcibly recruited by Section One and trained as a spy and assassin. Her compassion and sympathy constantly conflict with the ruthless orders she is given, and this endears her to the majority of the people she works with, including Walter, Birkoff, and Michael, who eventually becomes her love interest.
- Roy Dupuis as Michael Samuelle: A former radical student activist-turned-coldly efficient assassin, as well as Section’s top mission team leader. At first alternately cruel and compassionate toward Nikita, he eventually falls in love with her, and repeatedly puts his life on the line to protect her.
- Eugene Robert Glazer as Operations: The often ruthless head of Section One, and the show’s main antagonist for the majority of the series. He exercises considerable geopolitical power, which places him in conflict with the hierarchy above Section on multiple occasions. Later in the series, it is revealed that his real identity is Lieutenant Paul L. Wolfe, who was forcibly recruited into Section after serving in the Vietnam War.
- Alberta Watson as Madeline: Section One’s executive strategist, responsible for the psychological conditioning of all operatives, as well as the extraction of critical intel from captured terrorists—using torture if necessary. Madeline eventually becomes the show’s secondary antagonist, as she and Operations expend considerable Section resources to keep Nikita and Michael apart, as they perceive their romantic and professional partnership to be a threat to their power.
- Matthew Ferguson as Seymour Birkoff: Section One’s youthful head of Comm, who supervises mission operations in progress. Late in the series, he learns that he is one of two twin boys born to a Section operative, with the other—Jason Crawford—living on the outside as part of a psychological comparison implemented by Section. Crawford is later recruited into Section. Ferguson played both roles.
- Don Francks as Walter: Head of Munitions, he is responsible for creating and providing all weapons, gadgets, and tools needed for use on various missions. As one of the oldest Section operatives, he is initially flirtatious with Nikita, but eventually becomes a trusted confidante. Although one of Birkoff’s closest friends, their relationship is strained when Birkoff discovers Walter's role in the aforementioned psychological comparison.
- Cindy Dolenc as Katherine “Kate” Quinn: Late in the series, she becomes Birkoff’s replacement as head of Comm, and is forced to endure the newly recruited Jason Crawford’s romantic affections, while at the same time scheming to take the place of Madeline.

=== Recurring ===
- Anais Granofsky as Carla (seasons 1–2), Nikita's neighbor, later revealed to be one of Adrian's operatives.
- Julian Richings as Errol Sparks (seasons 1, 3), the leader of terrorist group Glass Curtain, responsible for the capture of Michael's first wife Simone.
- Ingrid Veninger as Siobhan Lawrence (seasons 1, 3), Glass Curtain's second-in-command.
- Carlo Rota as Mick Schtoppel (seasons 1–4) / "Mr. Jones" (seasons 4–5 ) / Reginald "Martin" Henderson (Season 5), a greenlisted informant, later revealed to be "Mr. Jones", the head of Center, the organization above Oversight that directs all Sections. Later, Mr. Jones is revealed to be another cover identity for actor Henderson.
- Nigel Bennett as Egran Petrosian (seasons 1–2), former deep cover operative who is later briefly in charge of Section One.
- Douglas O'Keefe as David Fanning (seasons 1–2), a terrorist hit man later recruited into Section One.
- Yvonne Scio as Lisa Fanning (seasons 1–2), David's wife and victim of his marital abuse. Also recruited into Section One.
- Tara Slone as Gail (seasons 1–2), Section One operative and Birkoff's girlfriend.
- Lindsay Collins as Devo One alias Elizabeth (seasons 1–5), a White Room operative used to torture uncooperative terrorists.
- James Faulkner as Dominic (seasons 1, 3), who tortured Nikita and Michael when they were captured by the terrorist group Red Cell.
- Stephen Shellen as Marco O'Brien (seasons 1, 5), a former police detective recruited into Section One; later became Michael's replacement.
- Bruce Payne as Jurgen (season 2), a high-ranking operative in Spec Ops, who evaluated Nikita upon her return to Section One.
- Jill Dyck as Belinda (season 2), an abeyance operative who became Walter's fiancé.
- Roman Podhora as Mowen (season 2), a Section One team leader.
- Kris Lemche as Greg Hillinger (seasons 2–4), Birkoff's rival in Section One, later revealed to be a mole for Oversight.
- Siân Phillips as Adrian (seasons 2, 4), the "Mother" of Section One, who sought to depose Operations with the help of Nikita.
- David Hemblen as George (seasons 3–4), the head of Oversight, former lover of Adrian and enemy of Operations.
- Samia Shoaib as Elena (seasons 3–4), Michael's wife as part of a "blood cover" mission to capture her father, a terrorist.
- Evan Caravela as Adam (seasons 3–5), Michael's son with Elena.
- Josh Holliday as Devo Two alias Henry (seasons 3–5), Devo One's White Room partner.
- Lawrence Bayne as Davenport (seasons 3–4), a Section One team leader loyal to Operations.
- Larissa Gomes as Naomi Hill (season 4), Jason Crawford's girlfriend and Section One "valentine operative."
- Kira Clavell as Jasmine Kwong (seasons 4–5), young recruit turned Section One operative.
- Polly Shannon as Michelle (season 5), Mr. Jones' mysterious secretary, and Nikita's sister.
- Edward Woodward as Mr. Jones alias Philip, codename "Flavius" (season 5), the true head of Center and Nikita's father.
- Aidan Devine as Graff (season 5), leader of terrorist "supergroup" the Collective.
- Conrad Coates as Haled (season 5), the Collective's second-in-command.

== Broadcasting history ==
Season	Episodes	Originally released	
Season	Episodes	First released	Last released
1	22	January 13, 1997	October 5, 1997
2	22	January 4, 1998	August 30, 1998
3	22	January 3, 1999	August 29, 1999
4	22	January 9, 2000	August 27, 2000
5	8	January 7, 2001	March 4, 2001

=== Ratings success ===
La Femme Nikita was the number-one Nielsen-rated drama on basic cable for its first two seasons. It had been "greenlighted" by the network's founder and "cable network pioneer" Kay Koplovitz and nurtured by former USA Network president Rod Perth, a "key player" in its development. But, after Barry Diller assumed control of the network in April 1998, he replaced Perth with Stephen Chao as network president. Heyn observed, "Although both Diller and Chao praised La Femme Nikita publicly, it soon became obvious that the series was no longer a priority. The non-stop publicity the series enjoyed under Perth began to dry up, and the only attention that La Femme Nikita received was the occasional promo spot, and even the frequency of those began to decline." During Nikita's third season, following Chao's "bizarre request that La Femme Nikita cast wrestlers in key terrorist roles as a way to cross-promote USA's broadcasts of the World Wrestling Entertainment" despite evidence that the shows did not have compatible demographics, Chao also began retooling USA Network's successful "Sunday Night Heat" block of action dramas at 10pm, which also included Pacific Blue and Silk Stalkings; he canceled Silk Stalkings and replaced it with a slate of new series that included The War Next Door, G vs. E, Manhattan, Arizona and Cover Me, all of which ultimately failed in the ratings and were also canceled. Consequently, La Femme Nikita tumbled in the ratings too, although the series still remained the top-rated drama on USA Network, even during its fourth season, when promotional advertisements for the series all but disappeared. Negotiations to continue Nikita for a fifth season and beyond failed owing to "disagreements between USA Network and Warner Bros. over La Femme Nikita's renewal terms[,] [which] spilled out publicly into the pages of [industry trade publications] Variety and The Hollywood Reporter."

=== "Save LFN" ===
Following the series' cancellation in 2000, its dedicated viewers mounted an extensive fan campaign to revive it. "Save LFN" was not the first successful fan campaign to use the internet to rally fans and renew a canceled series. "These kinds of efforts had resurrected canceled series before, beginning with the original Star Trek on NBC in 1968 all the way up to UPN's Roswell in 2000". However, "Save LFN" is notable for its size and inventiveness, including an "online renewal petition" which led to a full-page advertisement placed in The Hollywood Reporter that requested USA Network and Warner Bros. reconsider their decision. The campaign also amassed over 25,000 letters sent to both companies containing everything from dollar bills featuring images of co-star Roy Dupuis to sunglasses (Nikita's signature accessory) to old TVs, VCRs, and remote controls. A group of organizers calling themselves "First Team", based on the term for the lead members of a mission used frequently in the series, coordinated most of these efforts through their Save LFN fansite. As a result of these efforts, Stephen Chao announced in September 2000 that La Femme Nikita would return for a truncated fifth season of eight new episodes, which began airing in January 2001.

== CW series ==
On January 28, 2010, it was reported that The CW Television Network would develop a new TV pilot based loosely on the French film Nikita. The new show, which shares its name with the film, is executive-produced by McG, with Peter Johnson and Craig Silverstein serving as executive producers and writers. It is a joint production with Warner Bros. Studios and Wonderland Productions. On May 18, 2010, it was picked up to series.

== Merchandising ==
=== Home media ===
The complete series is available on DVD through Warner Bros. Home Video. The box sets use the USA/international title, La Femme Nikita.

Each DVD boxed set features a solitary image of Peta Wilson on the cover, with the remainder of the cast featured on the interior artwork. Only the covers for seasons one and five feature images of Wilson taken specifically as promotional photographs (for advertising campaigns and later marketing purposes) during those seasons. The DVD cover images for seasons two and three again feature promotional photographs used during the first season, while season four features a promotional photograph from advertisements for the second season.

- Season Two was originally scheduled for release on July 20, 2004, but it was delayed for two years due to a confusion in music licensing. Warner Bros. was unable to license the song "Loaded Gun" by Hednoize, featured in the episode "Off Profile." (Some websites have claimed that the song in question was from Garbage, but that is incorrect.) This was eventually resolved by replacing the song with another piece of music. A small number of Season Two box sets were distributed and sold in 2004 with "Loaded Gun" before it was withdrawn from store shelves and internet sales sites, and these sets are considered collector's items.

=== Soundtracks ===
An official soundtrack, released in June 1998, is still available on CD from TVT Records. It features the title theme from composer Mark Snow, as well as numerous songs heard during the first two seasons of the show from artists like Depeche Mode and Afro Celt Sound System. A "promotional release" in a limited run of 2000 CDs of Emmy-award winning composer Sean Callery's selections from his orchestral score for Nikita was first made available by Callery during the Close Quarters Standby 4 fan convention in May 2001.

=== Series merchandise ===
According to Christopher Heyn, "To many long-time viewers, La Femme Nikita had always been a natural for merchandising. Besides the usual array of T-shirts, jackets, coffee mugs, posters and other trinkets, the action content of the series lends itself perfectly to the development of video games, comic books, toys and action figures. Yet, during the entire run of the series, Warner Bros. released only one piece of merchandise—the soundtrack CD on TVT Records. Beyond that, there was nothing. This frustrated [former president of USA Network and key player in the series' development] Rod Perth to no end."(20) Heyn quotes Perth as saying: "'Warner Bros. never had an interest in this show ...'" (20). Nevertheless, Heyn reports, he himself "successfully brokered an official merchandising agreement between the Specialty Products division, a vendor in Toronto that already produced merchandise for the series' cast and crew, and the Sidekicks Society, the organizers of Close Quarters Standby 2", the second in a series of four La Femme Nikita fan conventions held in Toronto in October 1999.(Heyn 20) Such items included jackets, T-shirts, coffee mugs, and key chains emblazoned with the series logo and the copyright notice "©1999, Warner Bros." below the logo (photograph in Heyn 21). "Because of a delivery mixup," Heyn's photo caption reads, "most of the coffee mugs and keychains never made it to the convention in time for sale," and he adds, "The remaining boxes of jackets, T-shirts and coffee mugs sold out in less than an hour, leaving many empty-handed attendees frustrated and upset."(21) Moreover, Heyn observes, "That unfortunate outcome only validated Warner Bros.' reticence to merchandise La Femme Nikita on a larger scale. The studio lost money on the internet broadcast and made next to nothing from the limited merchandising deal, which echoed their attitude toward the series' financial construction."(Heyn 20)

In 2001, a video game based on Nikita—featuring dialogue written by La Femme Nikita supervising producer Peter Lenkov—was announced for the Xbox system, but the project was later cancelled.

== Critical response ==
On Metacritic, the first season received a score of 68/100 based on 7 reviews, indicating "generally favorable reviews". Andrea Higbie, writing for The New York Times said, "The show, which has received good reviews in publications including New York magazine, USA Today and The New York Times, is like a long MTV video, with few words but lots of music and action." Tom Gliatto, writing for People, gave the first season a B+, and commented, "Peta Wilson, an Australian actress with the harsh blonde hair, snub nose and oversize, depthless blue eyes of your average mass-produced doll, makes a sexy, amusing Nikita." Todd Everett, writing for Variety, said, "What was stylish in original version here becomes muddy and confusing attempt at MTV cutting and loud electronic soundtrack, and title may leave many USA watchers, accustomed to more conventional (and arguably superior) Renegade, Silk Stalkings and The Big Easy, confused. [...] Locations are nondescript, with darkish production design and lighting suggestive of some unnamed European country."

The second season received a 7/10 score from Sergio Non, who wrote for IGN: "It's dark, esoteric and morbid, offering up one dose of suffering after another. I couldn't stop watching."

== Awards and nominations ==
=== CableACE Awards ===
Year	Category	Nominee	Result	Ref.
1997	Guest Actor in a Dramatic Special or Series - "Gambit"	Harris Yulin	Nominated	

=== Gemini Awards ===
Year	Category	Nominee	Result	Ref.
1998 (March)	Best Performance by an Actress in a Continuing Leading Dramatic Role	Peta Wilson	Nominated	
1998 (March)	Best Performance by an Actor in a Featured Supporting Role in a Dramatic Series - "Noise"	Matthew Ferguson	Nominated	
1998 (March)	Best Performance by an Actor in a Guest Role in a Dramatic Series - "Innocent"	Maury Chaykin	Won	
1998 (March)	Best Performance by an Actress in a Guest Role in a Dramatic Series - "Rescue"	Nancy Beatty	Won	
1998 (March)	Best Direction in a Dramatic Series - "Gambit"	Jon Cassar	Nominated	
1998 (March)	Best Production Design or Art Direction in a Dramatic Program or Series - "Noise"	Rocco Matteo	Nominated	
1998 (March)	Best Costume Design - "Noise"	Laurie Drew	Nominated	
1998 (October)	Best Performance by an Actress in a Featured Supporting Role in a Dramatic Series - "New Regime"	Alberta Watson	Nominated	
1998 (October)	Best Photography in a Dramatic Program or Series - "Spec Ops"	Nikos Evdemon	Nominated	
1998 (October)	Best Costume Design - "New Regime"	Laurie Drew	Won	
1998 (October)	Chrysler's Canada's Choice Award	Jamie Paul Rock, Jay Firestone	Won	
1999	Best Dramatic Series	Jamie Paul Rock, Jay Firestone	Nominated	
1999	Best Performance by an Actress in a Continuing Leading Dramatic Role	Peta Wilson	Nominated	
1999	Best Costume Design - "Off Profile"	Laurie Drew	Nominated	
1999	Best Overall Sound in a Dramatic Program or Series - "Looking for Michael"	Daniel Latour, Scott Shepherd, Al Ormerod, Steve Baine	Nominated	
2000	Best Costume Design - "Getting Out of Reverse"	Laurie Drew	Nominated	
2000	Best Overall Sound in a Dramatic Program or Series - "Sympathy for the Devil"	Daniel Latour, Scott Shepherd, Al Ormerod	Won	
2000	Best Sound Editing in a Dramatic Program or Series - "Sympathy for the Devil"	Craig Henighan, Steve Baine, Jill Purdy, Rose Gregoris	Nominated	

=== OFTA Television Awards ===
Year	Category	Nominee	Result	Ref.
1998	Best Actress in a Cable Series	Peta Wilson	Nominated	
1998	Best Direction in a Cable Series		Nominated	
1998	Best Sound in a Series		Nominated	
1999	Best Guest Actress in a Cable Series	Margot Kidder	Nominated	
1999	Best Guest Actress in a Cable Series	Sian Phillips	Nominated	
