= Cindy Dolenc =

Canadian actress

Cindy Corrine Dolenc (born 1976 in Toronto, Ontario) is a Canadian actress. She is best known for appearing in the television series La Femme Nikita as Kate Quinn.

Her first paid acting role she received while studying in London, England, where she was cast by Stanley Kubrick in Eyes Wide Shut. She also appeared in the films Girl X, Love, Lust & Joy, the television series Tracker, and TV film June. In 2005 she took a part in a two-act drama North Beach with the TrapDoor Ensemble, performing in Santa Monica. She lives in California.

== Filmography ==
| Year | Title | Role | Notes |
|---|---|---|---|
| 1998 | Girl X | Janice | |
| 1999 | Eyes Wide Shut | Girl at Sharky's | |
| 2000 | Love, Lust & Joy | Tammy | |
| 2007 | Cul de sac | Linda | |
| 2010 | Casino Jack | Female Friend | |
| 2010 | The Chicago 8 | Congratulatory Spectator | |
| 2011 | The River Murders | Annie Locke | |
| 2013 | Final: The Rapture | Amanda Nelson | |
| 2021 | NCIS: Los Angeles | Ryan Logue | 1 episode |
