= The River Murders =

- Directed by: Rich Cowan
- Written by: Steve Anderson
- Produced by: Rich Cowan; Daniel Toll; Steve Anderson; Sarah Ann Schultz; Tay Voye
- Starring: Ray Liotta; Ving Rhames; Gisele Fraga; Melora Walters; Christian Slater; C.R. Clatworthy
- Cinematography: Dan Heigh
- Edited by: Jason A. Payne
- Music by: Pinar Toprak
- Distributed by: Sony Pictures Entertainment
- Release date: July 1, 2011
- Running time: 92 minutes
- Country: United States
- Language: English

The River Murders is a 2011 American psychological crime thriller film directed by Rich Cowan and starring Ray Liotta, Ving Rhames, and Christian Slater.

== Plot ==
Detective Jack Verdon is investigating a series of brutal murders when he realizes that each victim is a woman with whom he has slept or had a relationship with in the past. Verdon is taken off the case by FBI Agent Vukovitch and suspended by his Captain. Verdon is forced to work outside the law and confront his past to catch the killer, who has been extracting details of Verdon's other lovers – and subsequent victims – from each victim.

The killer is revealed to be John, the son Jack never knew was born from his first girlfriend, Rebecca. When she discovered she was pregnant Jack convinced her to have an abortion. However, she never did. John kidnaps Jack's wife, but cannot bring himself to take her life when he discovers that she is pregnant. He convinces Jack that he did kill her, causing Jack to kill him.

== Cast ==
- Ray Liotta as Jack Verdon
- Ving Rhames as Captain Art Langley
- Michael Rodrick as John Lee
- Gisele Fraga as Ana Verdon
- Christian Slater as FBI Agent Vuckovitch
- Sarah Ann Schultz as Jenny Tate
- Raymond J. Barry as Trent Verdon
- Melora Walters as FBI Agent Glover
- Cindy Dolenc as Annie Locke
- Michelle Krusiec as Sung Li
- C.R. Clatworthy as Thomas Lincoln
- Vanessa Toll as Ellie Nelson

== Production ==
Filming took place in the fall of 2010 in Spokane, Washington.

== Release ==
The River Murders premiered at the Cannes Film Festival and had a limited release in September 2011. Sony Pictures Home Entertainment released it on DVD on September 20, 2011.

== Reception ==
Paul Bradshaw of Total Film rated it 2/5 stars and called it a low point for the careers of the stars. Rohit Rao of DVD Talk rated it 1.5/5 stars and called it a "drab and generic serial killer thriller". Paul Pritchard of DVD Verdict wrote, "As a TV movie, The River Murders would be passable, but expecting people to spend money on it is asking too much."
