= Steve Anderson (director) =

American film director

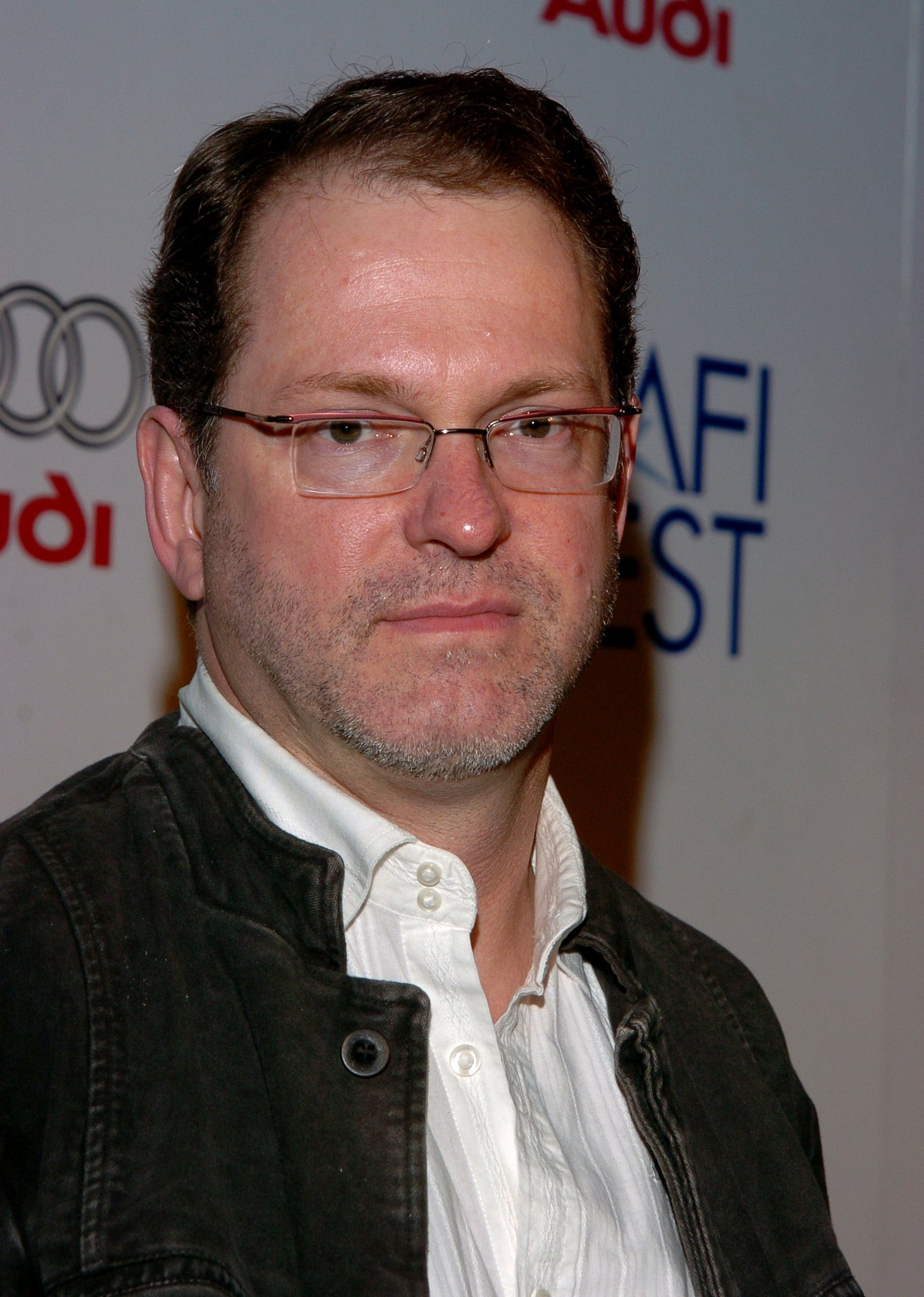
- Anderson in 2013
- Education: Nazareth College
- Occupation: Film director
- Years active: 1987–present
- Known for: The Big Empty; Fuck; The River Murders

Steve Anderson is an American film director, writer, and producer. After graduating with an undergraduate degree from Nazareth College in Rochester, New York, he gained experience as a television cameraman. He made documentary films for PBS, and won a Peabody Award for Safe Haven in 1987. He moved to Los Angeles, California in 1989 and worked for CNN.

Anderson made his feature film directorial debut in 2003 with The Big Empty starring Daryl Hannah and Jon Favreau. He directed the documentary film Fuck, which features commentary by a variety of individuals, including Kevin Smith, Steven Bochco, Janeane Garofalo, Bill Maher, Drew Carey, and Alanis Morissette.

== Early life and education ==
Anderson was raised in Pittsford, New York. He received an undergraduate degree from Nazareth College in Rochester, New York. He worked as a cameraman for WXXI-TV.

== Career ==
Steve Anderson gained experience in filmmaking while directing documentary films for PBS. One of these productions for PBS titled Safe Haven earned him recognition with a Peabody Award in 1987. In 1989, Anderson moved to Los Angeles, California. He worked for CNN in California.

Anderson made his feature film directorial debut in 2003 with the film The Big Empty.

He directed the documentary film Fuck, which features commentary by a variety of celebrities.

== Filmography ==
Year	Film	Director	Writer	Producer	Other	Notes
2003	The Big Empty	Yes	Yes			
2004	Promised Land		Yes			
2005	Fuck	Yes	Yes	Yes	Yes	Voice actor
2011	The River Murders		Yes	Yes		
2013	This Last Lonely Place	Yes	Yes	Yes		
2018	White Orchid	Yes	Yes	Yes		

== Awards ==
Year	Work	Award	Organization	Result
1987	Safe Haven, PBS documentary film	Peabody Award	Henry W. Grady College of Journalism and Mass Communication at the University of Georgia	Won
2003	The Big Empty	Sonoma Valley Film Festival Audience Award for Best Feature	Sonoma Valley Film Festival	Won
2004	Promised Land	Golden Leopard	Locarno International Film Festival	Nominated
2012	The River Murders	Festival Award: Best Feature Film	Hoboken International Film Festival	Won

== See also ==
- Carla Ulbrich
- List of science fiction films of the 2000s
- Rainstorm Entertainment
- ThinkFilm
