= Christian Slater =

American actor (born 1969)

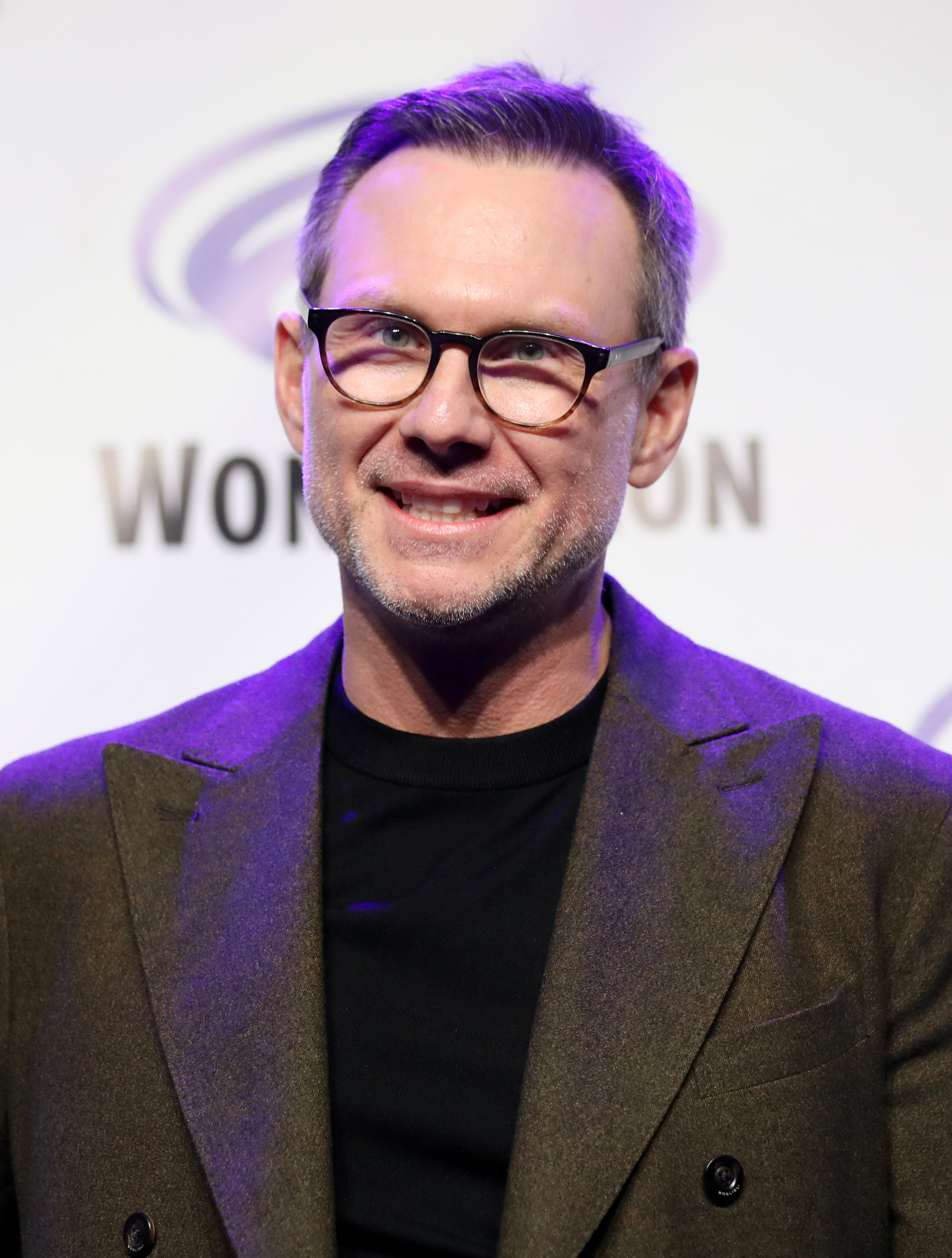
- Slater in 2024
- Born: Christian Michael Leonard Slater; August 18, 1969 (age 57); New York City
- Occupations: Actor; producer
- Years active: 1977–present
- Spouses: Ryan Haddon (m. 2000; div. 2007); Brittany Lopez (m. 2013)
- Children: 4
- Parents: Michael Hawkins; Mary Jo Slater
- Relatives: Bill Slater (great-uncle); Dayle Haddon (former-mother-in-law)

Christian Michael Leonard Slater (born August 18, 1969) is an American actor. He made his film debut with a leading role in The Legend of Billie Jean (1985) and gained wider recognition for his breakout role as Jason "J.D." Dean, a sociopathic high school student, in the satire Heathers (1989).

In the 1990s, Slater starred in a number of big-budget films, including Young Guns II (1990), Robin Hood: Prince of Thieves (1991), Interview with the Vampire (1994), Broken Arrow (1996), and Hard Rain (1998) as well as cult films like Gleaming the Cube (1989), Pump Up the Volume (1990) and True Romance (1993). He has had roles in other notable films, including The Name of the Rose (1986), Tucker: The Man and His Dream (1988), Windtalkers (2002), Alone in the Dark (2005), Bobby (2006), He Was a Quiet Man (2007), Nymphomaniac (2013), The Wife (2017), We Can Be Heroes (2020), and Blink Twice (2024).

He received critical acclaim for playing the title role in the USA Network television series Mr. Robot (2015–2019): it earned him the 2016 Golden Globe Award for Best Supporting Actor – Series, Miniseries or Television Film, and additional nominations for that award in 2017 and 2018. For his role as Mulgarath in fantasy series The Spiderwick Chronicles (2024), Slater received the Children's and Family Emmy Award for Outstanding Lead Performer.

In addition to his live-action roles, Slater has had an extensive voice-acting career, with roles including Pips in FernGully: The Last Rainforest (1992), Slater in Archer (2014–2023), Ushari in The Lion Guard (2016–2019), Rand Ridley in Inside Job (2021–2022), and Floyd Lawton / Deadshot in the DC Animated Movie Universe.

== Early life and education ==
Slater was born on August 18, 1969, in New York City, the son of Michael Hawkins (born Thomas Knight Slater), an actor also known as Michael Gainsborough; and Mary Jo Slater (née Lawton), an actors’ agent turned casting executive and producer. He has a maternal half-brother, Ryan Slater, who also became an actor. His great-uncle was radio personality Bill Slater.

Slater grew up in Manhattan Plaza in Hell's Kitchen, Manhattan. He attended the Dalton School, the Professional Children's School, and the Fiorello H. LaGuardia High School of Music & Art and Performing Arts.

== Career ==
=== 1977–1990: Early success ===
Slater played his first television role at the age of eight, on the ABC soap opera One Life to Live. Following a run on Ryan's Hope, he made his Broadway debut as the lisping Winthrop Paroo opposite Dick Van Dyke in the 1980 revival of The Music Man. Additional Broadway credits include Copperfield, Merlin, Macbeth, Side Man, and The Glass Menagerie. He also performed in London's West End in One Flew Over the Cuckoo's Nest and Swimming with Sharks.

Slater made his big-screen debut in The Legend of Billie Jean (1985), playing Billie Jean's brother Binx. The film had been expected to be a big hit, but fell short at the box office. It has since gained a cult following. His career improved with a role in The Name of the Rose (1986), playing alongside Sean Connery. Slater played Connery's apprentice monk, and they investigated a series of murders at a Benedictine abbey. Slater next played Junior Tucker in Francis Ford Coppola's Tucker: The Man and His Dream (1988).

At the age of 18 Slater played the dark character J.D. in the 1989 film Heathers alongside Winona Ryder. Slater was chosen for the part over many other actors, including Brad Pitt, and his performance drew a comparison with a young Jack Nicholson. Slater also starred in Gleaming the Cube and appeared in Beyond the Stars (both 1989). After Heathers, Slater had offers to play other troubled youths, including a rebellious teen in Pump Up the Volume (1990) and a wild gunman in Young Guns II (1990). In the latter, Slater acted alongside Emilio Estevez, Lou Diamond Phillips and Kiefer Sutherland.

=== 1991–1999: Box office success ===
In 1991 Slater was cast as Will Scarlett in the Hollywood big budget production of Robin Hood: Prince of Thieves alongside Kevin Costner, Morgan Freeman and Alan Rickman. The film was a commercial success, taking US$390 million worldwide, and Slater became one of the major A-list stars of the 1990s. With Slater being a big Star Trek fan (in addition to his mother, Mary Jo Slater, serving as the casting director for the film), he accepted a cameo role in Star Trek VI: The Undiscovered Country, shortly after playing Charlie Luciano in the crime drama Mobsters. The following year, he expanded his film genre and starred in the comedy Kuffs opposite Milla Jovovich. In 1993, Slater again stretched his acting skills, playing opposite Marisa Tomei in Untamed Heart and playing Clarence Worley in True Romance, written by Quentin Tarantino, which received many rave reviews. In his review of True Romance, Roger Ebert gave the movie 3 stars out of 4 and said, "the energy and style of the movie are exhilarating. Christian Slater has the kind of cocky recklessness the movie needs." In the same year, he was the first choice for the role of Eric Draven in the movie The Crow, directed by Alex Proyas.

He gained the role of the interviewer Daniel Molloy in Interview with the Vampire (1994) after the death of his friend River Phoenix, who was originally cast. Slater subsequently donated his earnings from the film to Phoenix's favorite charities. He played the character of Lewis in the romance film Bed of Roses in 1996 opposite Mary Stuart Masterson, then that of Riley Hale in the big-budget John Woo film Broken Arrow (1996), which also starred John Travolta. In 1998, Slater appeared in crime movie Hard Rain alongside Morgan Freeman. The same year, he also starred in the dark comedy Very Bad Things opposite Cameron Diaz.

=== 2000–present: Television roles, Mr. Robot ===
Since 2000 Slater has mixed TV work with leading roles in mainly lower budget films, along with supporting roles in a few mainstream productions. He appeared in the successful The West Wing and Alias TV series. He was also part of Hollywood films, including Bobby and 3000 Miles to Graceland. He has also worked as a voice-over artist in productions, including the character of 'Pips' in the successful Australian-American animated film FernGully: The Last Rainforest, Jet Fusion in an episode of The Adventures of Jimmy Neutron: Boy Genius, and narrating TV documentaries, including Prehistoric Planet and Dinosaur Planet. Slater also voiced the character John Watson a.k.a. "Wonko the Sane" in BBC Radio 4's production of The Hitchhiker's Guide to the Galaxy.

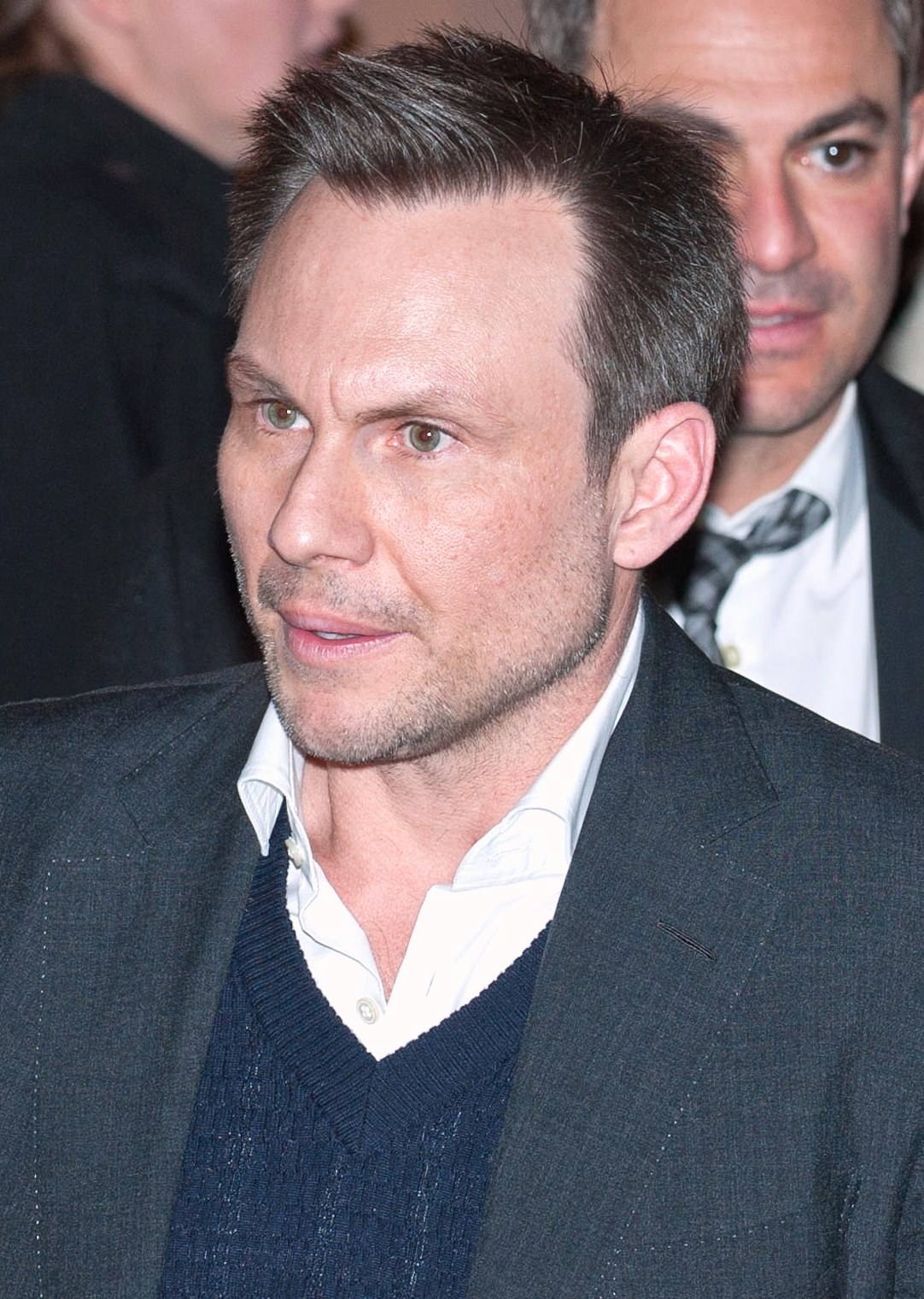
Slater at the Berlin International Film Festival in 2014

Slater starred in the television series My Own Worst Enemy in 2008 and The Forgotten in 2009. In 2011, he co-starred in the action film The River Murders, with Ray Liotta and Ving Rhames. Also in 2011, he starred in the television series, Breaking In, which ran for two seasons. Slater co-starred with Rhames again in the film Soldiers of Fortune (2012), and in the Sylvester Stallone action thriller Bullet to the Head (2013), directed by Walter Hill. He co-starred in the 2014 television series, Mind Games, which was cancelled after five episodes were aired. He was part of the ensemble in Lars von Trier's controversial film, Nymphomaniac.

In October 2014 Slater signed on for his title role in the television series on USA Network Mr. Robot. Slater plays a computer hacker, "Mr. Robot," who recruits Rami Malek's character, Elliot, into Slater's band of hackers called fsociety. The series premiered on June 24, 2015, and concluded in 2019 with its fourth season. For his performance, he earned the Golden Globe Award for Best Supporting Actor – Series, Miniseries or Television Film in 2016, with additional nominations in 2017 and 2018.

Prior to beginning his role in Mr. Robot, Slater announced in 2013 that he was developing and making a film based on Will Viharo's 1993 neo-noir novel Love Stories Are Too Violent for Me, the first of three works to feature Vic Valentine. However, the success of Mr. Robot and contracts for additional seasons has delayed his being able to develop his adaptation.

Slater voices the character "Slater" on the FX original series Archer. He also provided the voice of Ushari the Egyptian Cobra in The Lion Guard. He also made a short film for HP called The Wolf, which shows how easily malware can spread on unprotected printers and computers. In 2018, Slater appeared in The Public, the latest film by Estevez. At the world premiere of the film at the Toronto Film Festival, Slater discussed his role, Josh Davis, with Ikon London Magazine:

"He (Josh Davis) is definitely the character in the movie who represents that side of politics where he is not as open-hearted as you'd like him to be. He is definitely the guy who feels this is all a mess. And he is a law and order politician in this movie. So hopefully, he is the kind of guy you love to hate".

From 2021 to 2022, he voiced the character Rand Ridley on the adult sci-fi animated sitcom Inside Job. The show's creator announced the cancellation of the show in January 2023.

He was given a star on the Hollywood Walk of Fame for television in 2025.

== Personal life ==
In 2000 Slater married Ryan Haddon, the daughter of model Dayle Haddon. They have two children, a son, Jaden Christopher, born in 1999, and a daughter, Eliana Sophia, born in 2001. In 2003, Haddon was arrested for assaulting Slater during an argument at a Hard Rock Cafe while on vacation in Las Vegas. Haddon allegedly threw a glass bottle and cut Slater's neck. The wound required 20 stitches. Haddon was charged with domestic battery, booked at Las Vegas' Clark County Detention Center, and freed after posting bond. They announced their separation over Christmas in 2004. Slater was living in London at the time, performing in a stage version of One Flew Over the Cuckoo's Nest. The couple officially separated in 2005 and divorced in 2007.

On December 2, 2013, Slater married Brittany Lopez in Florida after three years of dating. They have a daughter together, born in August 2019, and a son, born in July 2024.

Slater practices Kempo Karate and divides his time between Coconut Grove in Miami, Florida and Hell's Kitchen, Manhattan.

=== Legal issues ===
Slater has had difficulties with substance abuse and has undergone treatment. In 1989, Slater was arrested for drunk driving. He was sentenced to ten days in jail.

In 1994, he was arrested when he tried to board a commercial plane with a gun in his baggage. He was sentenced to three days of community service.

In 1997, Slater was convicted of punching his girlfriend, Michelle Jonas, and assaulting a police officer while under the influence of heroin, cocaine, and alcohol. He had consumed them for two days straight and had little to no sleep. He was treated for more than 100 days in a rehabilitation facility while on bail, and then was sentenced to a three-month term in jail, followed by three months in a residential rehab center. He was released from prison after 59 days on the basis of good behavior.

On May 24, 2005, Slater was arrested in Manhattan, after allegedly groping a woman on the street. Slater was charged with third-degree sexual abuse. The charges were later dropped due to lack of evidence and on the condition that Slater keep out of trouble for six months.

After becoming sober Slater said, "Work is my hobby, staying sober is my job". In a similar vein, he said, "Work is my job, and having adventures with my kids. My kids are all-important".

The illusion of being very cool, that drinking is the hip thing to do and that you'll seem like Clark Gable. You go to a party and have a drink and feel like a superhero when the truth is you're looking rather foolish. Showing up for life 24/7 straight and sober can be tough if you're riddled with insecurities. Actually, the fastest way of knowing who you are is to know who you're not.

== Philanthropy ==
Slater has been a supporter of several charities, including 21st Century Leaders, Global Green, and Whatever It Takes. Slater appeared in an educational video on behalf of Nelson Mandela’s 46664 charity for AIDS awareness. He has also worked to promote humanitarian work in South Africa. In early May 2009 Slater visited wounded and recovering soldiers of Walter Reed Army Medical Center for the USO. On December 10, 2009, Slater visited Hattiesburg, Mississippi, where he contributed work for the television show Extreme Makeover: Home Edition. The episode aired on March 21, 2010.

== Filmography ==
=== Film ===
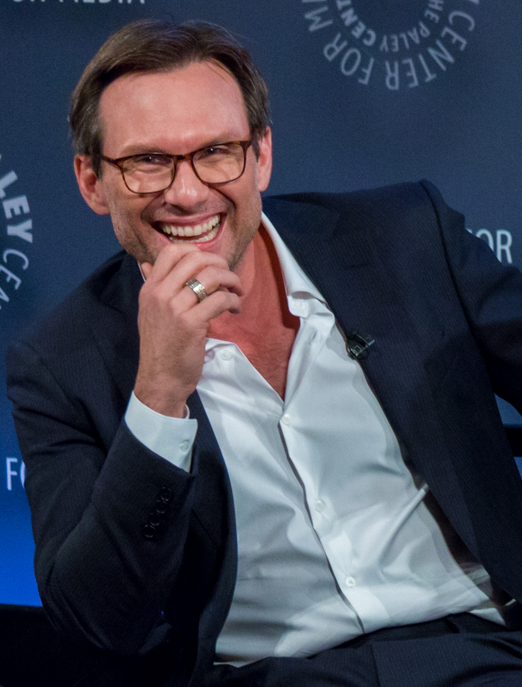
Slater speaking at the Mr. Robot panel during the 2015 PaleyFest

Y	Title	Role	Notes
1985	The Legend of Billie Jean	Binx Davy	
1985	Twisted	Mark Collins	
1986	The Name of the Rose	Adso of Melk	
1988	Tucker: The Man and His Dream	Preston Tucker Jr.	
1989	Heathers	Jason "J.D." Dean	
1989	Desperate for Love	Cliff Petrie	
1989	Beyond the Stars	Eric Michaels	
1989	The Wizard	Nick Woods	
1989	Gleaming the Cube	Brian Kelly	
1990	Tales from the Darkside: The Movie	Andy Smith	Segment: "Lot 249"
1990	Pump Up the Volume	Mark Hunter	
1990	Young Guns II	"Arkansas" Dave Rudabaugh	
1991	Robin Hood: Prince of Thieves	Will Scarlet	
1991	Mobsters	Charlie "Lucky" Luciano	
1991	Star Trek VI: The Undiscovered Country	Excelsior Communications Officer	Cameo
1992	Kuffs	George Kuffs	
1992	Where the Day Takes You	Social Worker	Uncredited
1992	FernGully: The Last Rainforest	Pips	Voice
1993	Untamed Heart	Adam	
1993	True Romance	Clarence Worley	
1994	Interview with the Vampire	Daniel Molloy	
1994	Jimmy Hollywood	William	
1995	Murder in the First	James Stamphill	
1996	Bed of Roses	Lewis Farrell	
1996	Broken Arrow	Captain Riley Hale	
1997	Austin Powers: International Man of Mystery	Easily Fooled Security Guard	Uncredited
1997	Julian Po	Julian Po	
1997	Basil	John Mannion	Also co-producer
1998	Hard Rain	Tom	Also co-producer
1998	Very Bad Things	Robert Boyd	Also executive producer
2000	The Contender	Reginald Webster	
2001	Who Is Cletis Tout?	Trevor Allen Finch	
2001	3000 Miles to Graceland	Hanson	
2001	Zoolander	Himself	Cameo
2002	Hard Cash	Thomas Taylor	Direct-to-video
2002	Windtalkers	Sgt. Pete "Ox" Henderson	
2003	Masked and Anonymous	Crew Guy No. 1	
2004	Churchill: The Hollywood Years	Winston Churchill	
2004	Mindhunters	J.D. Reston	
2004	The Confessor	Father Daniel Clemens	aka The Good Shepherd
2004	Pursued	Vincent Palmer	Direct-to-video
2005	Alone in the Dark	Edward Carnby	
2005	The Deal	Tom Hanson	Also executive producer
2006	Crossing the Line	Himself	Documentary
2006	Bobby	Daryl Timmons	
2006	Hollow Man 2	Michael Griffin	Direct-to-video
2007	He Was a Quiet Man	Bob Maconel	
2007	Slipstream	Ray / Matt Dodds / Patrolman No. 2	
2007	The Ten Commandments	Moses	Voice; Direct-to-video
2008	Love Lies Bleeding	Pollen	Direct-to-video
2008	Igor	Doctor Schadenfreude's Igor	Voice
2009	Dolan's Cadillac	Jimmy Dolan	Direct-to-video
2009	Lies & Illusions	Wes Wilson	Direct-to-video
2010	Quantum Quest: A Cassini Space Odyssey	Jammer	Voice
2011	Sacrifice	Father Porter	Direct-to-video
2011	The River Murders	Agent Vuckovitch	
2011	Guns, Girls and Gambling	John Smith / Lee	
2011	Without Men	Gordon Smith	
2012	Playback	Frank Lyons	
2012	Soldiers of Fortune	Craig Mackenzie	
2012	El Gringo	Lieutenant West	Direct-to-video
2012	Freaky Deaky	Skip Gibbs	
2012	Dawn Rider	"Cincinnati" John Mason	Direct-to-video
2012	Rites of Passage	Delgado	Direct-to-video
2012	Hatfields and McCoys: Bad Blood	Governor Bramlette	Direct-to-video
2012	Back to the Sea	Jack	Voice
2012	Assassin's Bullet	Robert Diggs	Direct-to-video
2013	Bullet to the Head	Marcus Baptiste	
2013	The Power of Few	Clyde	
2013	Stranded	Col. Gerard Brauchman	Direct-to-video
2013	Assassins Run	Michael Mason	Direct-to-video
2013	Nymphomaniac	Joe's father	
2014	Ask Me Anything	Paul Spooner	
2014	Way of the Wicked	Henry	Direct-to-video
2015	Hot Tub Time Machine 2	Brett McShaussey	Uncredited
2015	The Adderall Diaries	Hans Reiser	
2016	King Cobra	Stephen Kocis	
2017	The Summit	Dereck McKinley	
2017	Mune: Guardian of the Moon	Leeyoon	Voice; English dub
2017	The Wife	Nathanial Bone	
2018	The Public	Josh Davis	
2018	Suicide Squad: Hell to Pay	Floyd Lawton / Deadshot	Voice; Direct-to-video
2020	We Can Be Heroes	Tech-No	
2023	Chupa	Richard Quinn	
2023	Freelance	Sebastian Earle	
2024	Unfrosted	Mike Diamond	
2024	Blink Twice	Vic	
2025	If I Had Legs I'd Kick You	Charlie	
2026	How to Rob a Bank	David Walton	

Key
†	Denotes films that have not yet been released

=== Television ===
Year	Title	Role	Notes
1981	Standing Room Only	Billy	Episode: "Sherlock Holmes"
1982	Pardon Me for Living	Virgil Meade	Television film
1983	ABC Weekend Special	Billy	Episode: "The Haunted Mansion Mystery"
1983	Living Proof: The Hank Williams Jr. Story	Walt Willey	Television film
1984	Tales from the Darkside	Jody Tolliver	Episode: "A Case of the Stubborns"
1984, 1986	All My Children	Scotty, Caleb Thompson	
1985	Ryan's Hope	D. J. LaSalle	6 episodes
1986	Crime Story	Teen Boy	Episode: "Old Friends, Dead Ends"
1986	The Equalizer	Michael Winslow	Episode: "Joyride"
1988	L.A. Law	Andy Prescott	Episode: "Fetus Completus"
1991, 1993	Saturday Night Live	Himself	Host; 2 episodes
1992	Shelley Duvall's Bedtime Stories	Himself	Narrator; Episode: There's a Nightmare in My Closet/There's an Alligator Under My Bed/There's Something in My Attic
1993	1993 MTV Video Music Awards	Himself	Host; Television special
2002	Alias	Neil Caplan	2 episodes
2002	The West Wing	Lt. Cmdr. Jack Reese	3 episodes
2002	Great Books	Narrator	Voice; Episode: "Inferno"
2002–2003	Prehistoric Planet	Narrator	Voice; Season 2
2003	Dinosaur Planet	Narrator	Voice; 4 episodes
2003, 2005	The Adventures of Jimmy Neutron, Boy Genius	Jet Fusion	Voice; 2 episodes
2004	Top Gear	Himself	1 episode
2005–2012	Robot Chicken	Various voices	Voice; 6 episodes
2006	Odd Job Jack	Agent Brody	Episode: "29.5"
2006	My Name Is Earl	Woody	Episode: "Robbed a Stoner Blind"
2008	My Own Worst Enemy	Edward Albright / Henry Spivey	9 episodes
2009	The Forgotten	Alex Donovan	17 episodes
2009	Curb Your Enthusiasm	Christian Slater	Episode: "The Hot Towel"
2010	The Office	Christian Slater	Episode: "Sabre"
2011	Entourage	Christian Slater	Episode: "Out with a Bang"
2011–2012	Breaking In	Oz	20 episodes; also producer
2012	Phineas and Ferb	Paul the Delivery Guy	Voice; Episode: "Delivery of Destiny"
2013	Out There	Johnny Slade	Voice; Episode: "Springoween"
2014	Mind Games	Ross Edwards	10 episodes
2014	Stan Lee's Mighty 7: Beginnings	Lazer Lord	Voice; Television film
2014–2016, 2022–2023	Archer	Slater	Voice; 13 episodes
2015	Two and a Half Men	Christian Slater	Episode: "Of Course He's Dead"
2015	Jake and the Never Land Pirates	The Grim Buccaneer	Voice; 2 episodes
2015–2019	Mr. Robot	Mr. Robot	45 episodes; also producer
2016–2017	Dawn of the Croods	Gurg	Voice; 3 episodes
2016–2017	Live with Kelly	Himself	Guest host; 13 episodes
2016–2019	The Lion Guard	Ushari	Voice; 13 episodes
2016–2019	Milo Murphy's Law	Elliot Decker	Voice; 14 episodes
2017	Jeff & Some Aliens	Zergrees	2 episodes
2017	Justice League Action	Deadshot	Voice; 3 episodes
2017	Rick and Morty	Vance Maximus	Voice; Episode: "Vindicators 3: The Return of Worldender"
2018	Explained	Narrator	Voice; Episode: "Cryptocurrency"
2020	Dirty John	Dan Broderick	8 episodes
2020	Scooby-Doo and Guess Who?	Christian Slater	Voice; Episode: "The High School Wolfman's Musical Lament!"
2021	Dr. Death	Dr. Randall Kirby	8 episodes
2021	Lego Star Wars: Terrifying Tales	Ren	Voice; Television short
2021–2022	Inside Job	Rand Ridley	Voice; 18 episodes
2022	The Boys Presents: Diabolical	The Narrator: Paul	Voice; Episode: "An Animated Short Where Pissed-Off Supes Kill Their Parents"
2022	Willow	Allagash	Episode: "Prisoners of Skellin"
2022	Fleishman Is in Trouble	Archer Sylvan	2 episodes
2024	The Spiderwick Chronicles	Dr. Dorian Brauer / Mulgarath	8 episodes
2024–2025	Dexter: Original Sin	Harry Morgan	Main role
TBA	Army of the Dead: Lost Vegas †	Torrance	Voice; post-production

Key
†	Denotes television productions that have not yet been released

=== Stage ===
Year	Title	Role	Venue
1978	Mister Scrooge	Tiny Tim Cratchit	Trinity Theatre
1980	The Music Man	Winthrop Paroo	New York City Center
1981	Copperfield	Billy Mowcher	August Wilson Theatre
1982	Macbeth	Macduff's Son	Circle in the Square Theatre
1983	Merlin	Young Merlin / Arthur	Mark Hellinger Theatre
1984	Landscape of the Body	Bert Yearn	Second Stage Theatre
1999	Side Man	Clifford Glimmer	John Golden Theatre
2004–2005	One Flew Over the Cuckoo's Nest	Randle Patrick "Mac" McMurphy	Gielgud Theatre
2005	The Glass Menagerie	Tom Wingfield	Ethel Barrymore Theatre
2006	One Flew Over the Cuckoo's Nest	Randle Patrick "Mac" McMurphy	Garrick Theatre
2007–2008	Swimming with Sharks	Buddy Ackerman	Vaudeville Theatre
2015	Spamalot	Sir Galahad	The Hollywood Bowl
2017–2018	Glengarry Glen Ross	Richard Roma	Playhouse Theatre
2023	Gutenberg! The Musical!	Producer (one night cameo)	James Earl Jones Theatre
2025	Curse of the Starving Class	Weston Tate	Pershing Square Signature Center

== Awards and nominations ==
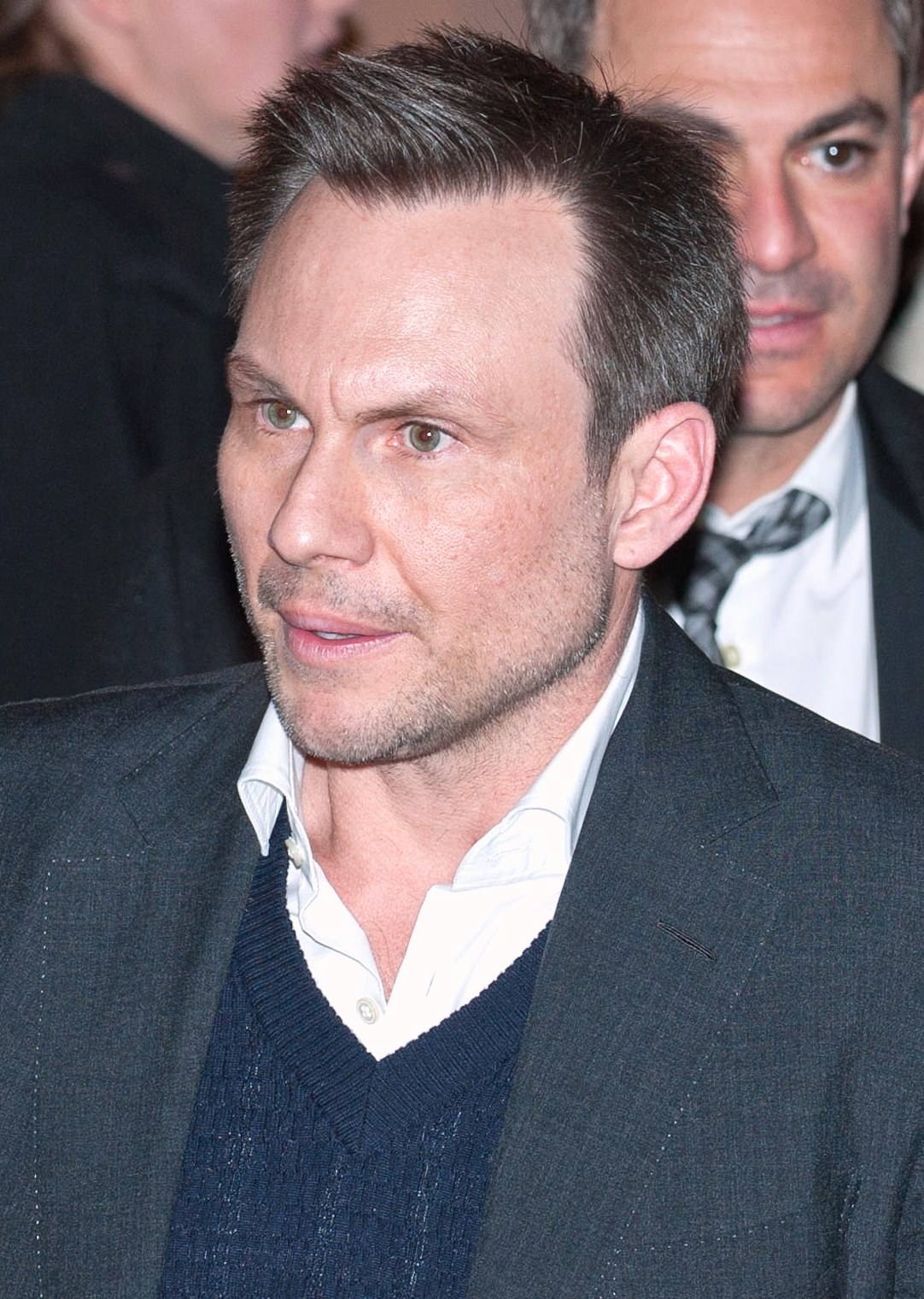
Slater at the 64th Berlin International Film Festival in 2014

Year	Award	Category	Title	Result
1990	Chicago Film Critics Association Award	Most Promising Actor	Heathers	Nominated
1991	Independent Spirit Award	Best Male Lead	Pump Up the Volume	Nominated
1992	MTV Movie Award	Most Desirable Male	Kuffs	Nominated
1993	MTV Movie Award	Most Desirable Male	Untamed Heart	Won
1993	MTV Movie Award	Best Kiss (with Marisa Tomei)	Untamed Heart	Won
1994	MTV Movie Award	Best Kiss (with Patricia Arquette)	True Romance	Nominated
1994	Saturn Award	Best Actor	True Romance	Nominated
1995	MTV Movie Award	Most Desirable Male	Interview with a Vampire: The Vampire Chronicles	Nominated
1996	MTV Movie Award	Best Fight (with John Travolta)	Broken Arrow	Nominated
2000	Slate Award	Best Male Performance	Very Bad Things	Won
2001	Critics' Choice Award	Alan J. Pakula Award	The Contender	Won
2006	Hollywood Film Award	Ensemble of the Year	Bobby	Won
2007	Screen Actors Guild Award	Outstanding Performance by a Cast in a Motion Picture	Bobby	Nominated
2007	Critics' Choice Award	Best Acting Ensemble	Bobby	Nominated
2016	People's Choice Award	Favorite Cable TV Actor	Mr. Robot	Nominated
2016	Critics' Choice Television Award	Best Supporting Actor in a Drama Series	Mr. Robot	Won
2016	Golden Globe Award	Best Supporting Actor – Series, Miniseries or Television Film	Mr. Robot	Won
2016	Satellite Award	Best Supporting Actor – Series, Miniseries or Television Film	Mr. Robot	Won
2016	Critics' Choice Television Award	Best Supporting Actor in a Drama Series	Mr. Robot	Nominated
2017	Golden Globe Award	Best Supporting Actor – Series, Miniseries or Television Film	Mr. Robot	Nominated
2018	Golden Globe Award	Best Supporting Actor – Series, Miniseries or Television Film	Mr. Robot	Nominated
2022	Critics' Choice Television Award	Best Supporting Actor in a Movie/Miniseries	Dr. Death	Nominated
2025	Children's and Family Emmy Awards	Outstanding Lead Performer	The Spiderwick Chronicles	Won
