= Historical Dictionary of Science Fiction =

Online database

Historical Dictionary of Science Fiction is a website created by lexicographer Jesse Sheidlower that traces the origin of terms in science fiction literature. The website launched in January 2021.

== Background ==
The genesis for the site was the Oxford English Dictionary's Science Fiction Citations Project, begun in 2001. Sheidlower, an editor-at-large for the OED, used crowdsourcing to collect words and their history from science fiction. The project resulted in the Hugo Award-winning book Brave New Words.

In 2020, Sheidlower obtained permission from the OED to continue the project independently.

== Development ==
The Internet Archive had scanned large numbers of science fiction pulp magazines, providing a digital resource that was not available when the earlier project began. With that resource and the extended period of isolation due to the COVID-19 pandemic, Sheidlower tracked down the original appearance of words such as "mutant", "first contact", and "deep space", and began assembling the new website, launching it live in January, 2021.

As a historical dictionary, the site provides not only a definition of a term, but also the historical development of their forms and meanings. Particular attention is paid to antedating, which means finding the first known occurrence. The dictionary is a useful resource for both fans of science fiction and "for scholars interested in the history of science and technology", according to Elizabeth Swanstrom, co-editor of the journal Science Fiction Studies and an English scholar at the University of Utah. The co-editor of the science fiction journal Extrapolation and a professor of English at the University of Georgia, Isaiah Lavender III, notes the usefulness of the dictionary for academic analysis of issues, saying "Having these origin dates in mind can help a student or scholar build a framework to analyze something like the concept of the racial ‘other’ where robots and androids (as well as aliens) are stand-ins for oppressed peoples." Lavender points out the problem of lack of diversity in the dictionary at present, which Sheidlower also acknowledges.

The Historical Dictionary of Science Fiction contains approximately 1800 entries at launch, identifying the literature in which the term first appeared and subsequent uses of the term over time. The entries include terms used over three centuries. For example, the first recorded use of teleport is an 1878 mention in The Times of India.

Sheidlower is continuing to add additional terms after the initial launch and hopes to include more terms from 21st century science fiction. The general criteria for inclusion of a term is that "a word must either be adopted widely within science fiction or become part of the broader culture".
