= Hollywood Star Lanes =

Bowling alley utilized in two American films

Coordinates: 34°5′28.28″N 118°18′12.56″W

- Interactive map of Hollywood Star Lanes
- Address: 5227 Santa Monica Blvd. Los Angeles, California
- Owner: Joseph Barnese, Sam Barnese
- Type: Bowling center

Construction
- Built: 1960
- Opened: January 7, 1961
- Closed: August 8, 2002
- Demolished: 2002
- Main contractor: Baingo Brothers General Contractors

Hollywood Star Lanes was a 32-lane bowling alley located on Santa Monica Boulevard in Los Angeles, California.

The alley was opened in late 1960 by owner Joseph Barnese with 32 lanes, a cocktail lounge, and a coffee shop. Grand opening ceremonies were held January 7, 1961. Barnese's son Sam Barnese was general manager and Herb Roth, manager. The alley was featured in the film The Big Lebowski, which was filmed on location over three weeks of the eleven-week filming schedule. At the time of filming, traditional paper score cards were still used. Profits from the film allowed for electronic scoring monitors to be installed.

The alley was also a filming location for The Big Empty in early 2002. In August 2002, after several years of failed negotiations with then owner Sam Barnese the alley was closed after the Los Angeles Unified School District seized the land by eminent domain in order to build an elementary school at the site (today known as Kingsley Elementary School). The center closed on August 8 of that year.

In July 1977, the area behind the bowling alley was used by the FBI as a staging area to conduct a raid on two nearby Scientology locations.
