= Brave New Words =

2007 science fiction dictionary

Brave New Words: The Oxford Dictionary of Science Fiction
- Editor: Jeff Prucher
- Language: English
- Subject: Science fiction
- Publisher: Oxford University Press
- Publication date: 2007
- ISBN: 0-19-530567-1

Brave New Words: The Oxford Dictionary of Science Fiction is a book published in 2007 by the Oxford University Press. It was edited by Jeff Prucher, with an introduction by Gene Wolfe.

== Contents ==
The vocabulary includes words used in science fiction books, TV and film. A second category rises from discussion and criticism of science fiction, and a third category comes from the subculture of fandom. It describes itself as "the first historical dictionary devoted to science fiction", tracing how science fiction terms have developed over time.

== Reception ==
The dictionary received positive reviews from science fiction journals, although the critic Rob Latham felt that its digital version (the SF Citations Project) might be preferable to the print format, which could grow out-of-date. In 2008 it won the Hugo Award for Best Related Book and was cited as an Outstanding Reference Source by the American Library Association.

== See also ==
- Historical Dictionary of Science Fiction
