= Christopher M. Fairman =

American law professor

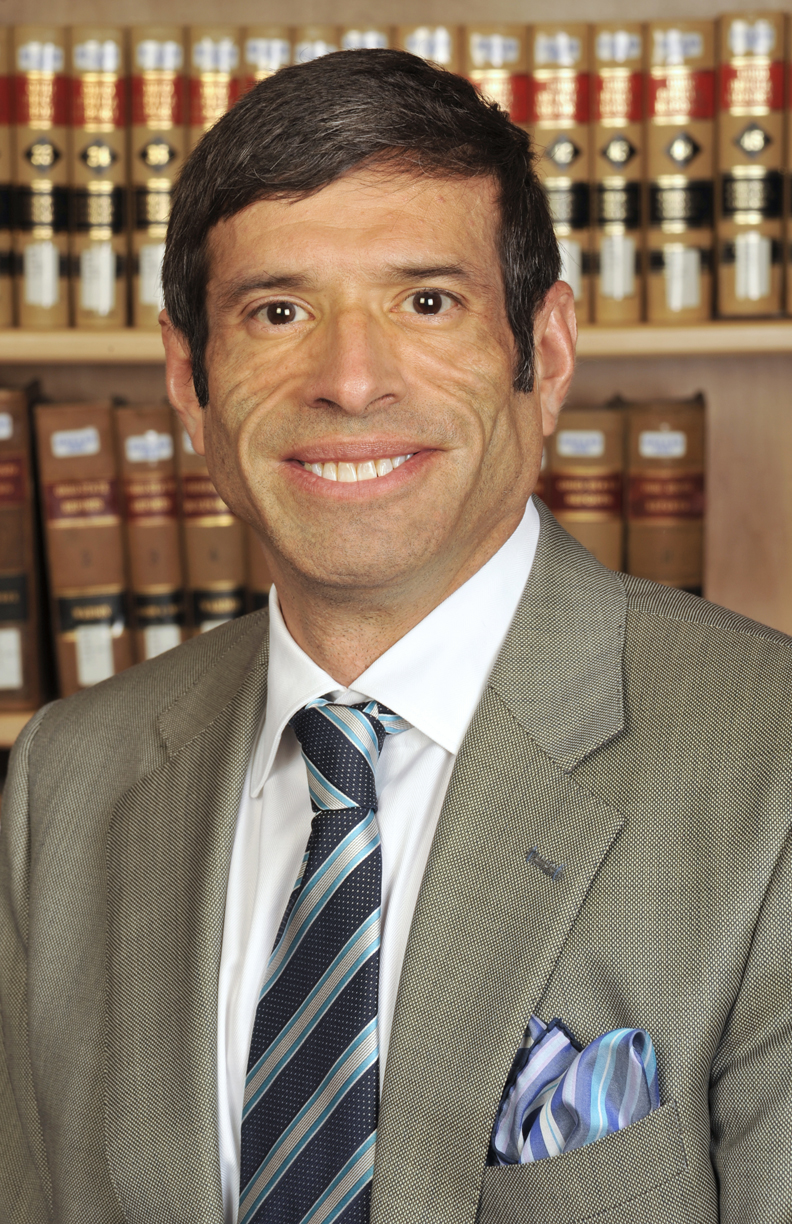
- Christopher M. Fairman
- Born: July 26, 1960; Kansas, United States
- Died: July 22, 2015 (aged 54); United States
- Occupations: Professor, Lawyer
- Known for: Research on freedom of speech, censorship and word taboo
- Notable work: Fuck: Word Taboo and Protecting Our First Amendment Liberties

Christopher M. Fairman (July 26, 1960 – July 22, 2015) was a professor of law at Ohio State University Moritz College of Law and Associate Dean for Faculty. He was also the C. William O'Neill Professor in Law and Judicial Administration.

Fairman was born in Kansas. He was awarded the "Outstanding Professor Award 2003" by the Graduating Class of 2003.

Fairman's article "Fuck", published in 2007 by Cardozo Law Review, examines the legal implications of the use of the word fuck. Fairman's article quickly became one of the most downloaded scholarly legal articles on the Internet, leading to some controversy in Brian Leiter's list of "Most Downloaded Law Faculties, 2006" because Brian Leiter chose to omit Ohio State and Emory University School of Law (where Fairman was a visiting professor) from the list. Leiter argued that without Fairman's article, neither school would be close to the top 15.

In 2009 Fairman followed up this article with the book Fuck: Word Taboo and Protecting Our First Amendment Liberties, published by Sphinx.

Fairman's primary areas of focus were civil procedure and heightened pleading.

He died of cardiac arrest at the age of 54 on July 22, 2015. At the time of his death, Fairman's 2007 Cardozo Law Review article, "Fuck" was still classed with the 20 top downloaded works on the Social Science Research Network.

== Selected publications ==
- "Heightened Pleading," 81 Tex. L. Rev. 551 (2002)
- "Ethics and Collaborative Lawyering: Why Put Old Hats on New Heads?," 18 Ohio St. J. on Disp. Resol. 505 (2003)
- "No McJustice for the Fat Kids," Legal Times, Feb. 17, 2003, at 42
- "The Myth of Notice Pleading," 45 Ariz. L. Rev. 987 (2003)
- "An Invitation to the Rulemakers – Strike Rule 9(b)," 38 U.C. Davis L. Rev. 281 (2004)
- "House Follies," Legal Times, June 13, 2005, at 76
- "A Proposed Model Rule for Collaborative Law," 21 Ohio St. J. on Disp. Resol. 73 (2005).
- "Fuck," 28 Cardozo L. Rev. 1711 (2007).
- "Why We Still Need a Model Rule for Collaborative Law: A Reply to Professor Lande," 22 Ohio St. J. on Disp. Resol. 707 (2007).
- Fuck: Word Taboo and Protecting Our First Amendment Liberties. Sphinx Publishing. 2009. ISBN 978-1572487116. LCCN 2009016762. OCLC 262433445.; Kindle edition: ISBN 1572487119 ASIN B00348UN8E
