= Red Peters =

American musician and comedian

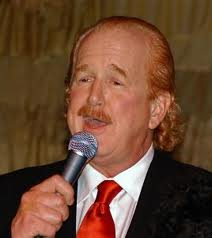
- Red Peters performing
- Born: Douglas Stevens; July 11, 1950 (age 76); Quincy, Massachusetts U.S.
- Other name: Red Peters

Comedy career
- Years active: 1971–present
- Medium: Comedy, radio, music

Douglas Stevens, better known by his stage name Red Peters, is an American musician and comedian. He has released two albums and three compilations. He was the host of The Red Peters Comedy Music Hour from 2005–2013 on SiriusXM, and a frequent guest on The Howard Stern Show.

== Early career ==
Stevens attended Massachusetts College of Art and Design in Boston from 1968–1971, majoring in film. He was one of the original students of The Studio For Interrelated Media.

Stevens left art school in late 1971 to go on the road with his first music group, Gross National Productions (or "GNP") as lead vocalist under the stage name "Matt Maverick." GNP recorded their debut album, "P Flaps and Low Blows" on Metromedia Records in 1972; the album was produced by George "Shadow" Morton and John Linde. Off the album, the band toured nationally, both headlining as well as opening for major acts such as Lee Michaels, Tommy James, Sha Na Na, Badfinger, Spirit, Jeremy Steig, Muddy Waters, John Lee Hooker, the Mahavishnu Orchestra, and Frank Zappa and the Mothers of Invention.

Following GNP's breakup, Stevens (under the name "Red Stevens") co-wrote and directed the rock comedy musical theater production Rockfights – Rich Amusement, which played at the Overland Theater in Boston in 1976.

== Career ==
=== Music ===
In 1984, the song "Blow Me (You Hardly Even Know Me)" was the first single ever released by Stevens as "Red Peters," as a 45 rpm single. He co-wrote the song with Ed Grenga (a.k.a. "Babe Marino"), who also gave Stevens the stage name "Red Peters." As Peters told Outer Shell Magazine, "My music director, Babe Marino, and I were messing around with a big band arrangement one day and the words just flowed out. We brought the scratch recording to a party that night and people went shithouse for it. We went on to formally record it with his orchestra along with the Alan Pinchloaf Singers."

In 1990, Peters released "How's Your Whole... Family?" as a second single. This led to a full-length release, produced by Grenga, in 1995 for Ugly Sisters Records, I Laughed... I Cried... I Fudged My Undies! A nationwide radio tour followed, including the Mancow Muller show, The Bruce Bond Late Afternoon Show, the Dr. Demento radio show, and eventually Howard Stern. On his first appearance on Stern's show in 1996, he sang "A Ballad of a Dog Named Stains."

In 1999, Peters released his 2nd full-length album, Ol' Blue Balls Is Back! on Ball Bag Records. It was again produced by Grenga.

On October 8, 2003, Peters and Ball Bag Records signed an exclusive distribution deal with Oglio Entertainment Group, and his music is distributed by Universal Fontana. This led to two single releases, "I Can't Say These Things" in 2005, and "When I Jerkoff, I Think of You" in 2006. The Best of the Red Peters Comedy Music Hour, Vol. #1, a compilation album of various artists, was the first full-length release with Oglio in 2007. This album consisted of songs and artists featured on his Sirius Howard 101 radio show.

In 2009, Peters released It's A Red Peters Christmas! Vol. 1, a collection of holiday songs from guests that appeared on his Red Peters Comedy Music Hour holiday radio programs on Sirius XM Howard 101, once again performed by various artists. In 2010, another compilation from his radio show, called Red Peters Presents The Summer Song Sizzler, was released.

In October 2010, Peters and comic Margaret Cho recorded a cover of the Dick Shreve song, "The Christmas Gift (Just A Little Christmas Blow Job)" when Cho was in Boston on her "Cho Dependent" national tour, performing at the Wilbur Theater. The song was released as a single on Oglio Records in November 2010.

=== Audio production ===
In 1976, Stevens founded the music production company Handsome Brothers Music Service with fellow GNP band member Tom Dempsey. The company specializes in commercial music production for television, radio, corporate videos, advertising, and motion pictures. Composer Ed Grenga became a business partner in 1984; besides corporate work, Grenga has produced all of Peters' albums and scored numerous feature films as well. For the 2009 baseball season, Grenga and Stevens created pregame, in-game and post-game music for NESN's broadcasts of Boston Red Sox games. The music debuted on Opening Day in 2009.

=== Radio show ===
In 2005, Peters started a Sirius Satellite Radio show called The Red Peters Comedy Music Hour on Howard Stern's "Howard 101" channel, as a weekly broadcast. The first show aired November 18, 2005. The show is described as "uncensored songs, oddities, taboo subjects and the forbidden spoken word." In 2010, Peters' show went to a schedule of 8 one-hour specials a year, primarily on holiday weekends.

=== Television, movies, and theater ===
In 1997, Peters appeared on Stern's radio show, and shortly thereafter on his CBS late night television show, The Howard Stern Radio Show. He was featured in a live segment from the radio show, and in music video footage of his song, "The Ballad of a Dog Named Stains".

Peters appeared in the movie Johnny Slade's Greatest Hits (Meet The Mobsters) in 2005. Handsome Brothers partner Grenga produced the songs and scored the film. Peters' "Blow Me (You Hardly Even Know Me)" was featured in the film's opening scenes, and actor John Fiore sang an arrangement of Peters' song, "The First Time I Met You". Peters had a role in the film, playing himself, as a wise cracking stand-up comic.

In 2008, Peters and singer/songwriter Gregory Roman, star of the short film Titler that won an Honorable Mention at the Sundance Film Festival in 2000, co-wrote and produced the Nu-vaudeville production, Oddvile. It was a 2-hour show, featuring a variety of music, comedy, and novelty acts. It premiered June 7, 2008, at Boston's Cutler Majestic Theater.

== Farting incident with President Obama ==
In August 2011, while vacationing on Martha's Vineyard, Peters is reported to have accidentally farted in front of Barack Obama. "Mr. Obama was forced from the fiction aisle to the self-help section until the Secret Service deemed the area was clear," Peters told the Boston Herald. "They were polite but not amused. The young daughter (Sasha) was blocking her nose. I was so embarrassed." The President's security detail then escorted Peters from the bookstore.

== Discography ==
- "Blow Me (You Hardly Even Know Me)" 45 rpm single (HBMS) 1984
- "How's Your Whole... Family?" single (HBMS) 1990
- I Laughed, I Cried, I Fudged My Undies! (Ugly Sisters/Ball Bag Records) 1994
- Ol' Blue Balls Is Back! (Ball Bag Records) 1999
- I Laughed, I Cried, I Fudged My Undies! and Ol' Blue Balls Is Back!- re-issues (Oglio Records) 2004
- "I Can't Say These Things" (Oglio Records) single 2005
- "When I Jerkoff, I Think of You" (Oglio Records) single 2006
- The Best of the Red Peters Comedy Music Hour- Vol. 1 (Oglio Records) 2007 Various Artists
- It's A Red Peters Christmas (Oglio Records) 2009 Various Artists
- The Red Peters Summer Song Sizzler (Oglio Records) 2010 Various Artists
- Have A Wonderful Hawaiian Christmas (Oglio Records) 2010
- "The Christmas Gift (Just A Little Christmas Blowjob)" (with Margaret Cho) (Oglio Records) 2010

== See also ==
- Howard 100
- Sirius Satellite Radio
