= The Big Empty (2003 film) =

- Directed by: Steve Anderson
- Written by: Steve Anderson
- Produced by: Gregg L. Daniel; Steven G. Kaplan; Doug Mankoff; Andrew Spaulding
- Starring: Jon Favreau; Joey Lauren Adams; Bud Cort; Jon Gries; Daryl Hannah; Adam Beach; Gary Farmer; Rachael Leigh Cook; Brent Briscoe; Melora Walters; Kelsey Grammer; Sean Bean
- Cinematography: Chris Manley
- Edited by: Scot Scalise
- Music by: Brian Tyler
- Distributed by: Artisan Entertainment; Aura Entertainment
- Release date: November 14, 2003
- Running time: 94 minutes
- Country: United States
- Language: English

The Big Empty is a 2003 comedy film directed and written by Steve Anderson. It stars Jon Favreau as a struggling actor with a bizarre request from his neighbor to deliver a suitcase that he cannot open. While there, he meets an unusual cast of characters, and starts to think this delivery might be more than it seems.

== Plot ==
John Person is a struggling actor in Los Angeles who is $27K in debt. His neighbor Neely offers him $27K to take a gun and deliver a blue suitcase to "Cowboy" in Baker.

Arriving in Baker at his hotel, Person just misses Cowboy. At a bar, he is immediately held at gunpoint by Randy, who thinks Person is after his girlfriend Ruthie. She comes to Person's room later, returning his dropped wallet. In a diner the next day, Person meets Dan, who tells many strange tales and conspiracy theories about the desert. Person meets Ruthie outside a gas station and they drive to Devil's Crest lakebed outside town. As they get drunk, he hears stories about disappearing people. Person drives Ruthie home when she gets sick and passes out.

At the motel, Person again misses Cowboy, who left him a bowling ball bag that he is not allowed to open. Person's friend Grace calls to tell him Neely was beheaded, and FBI agent Banks is looking for him. Fearing Neely's head is in the bag, Person buries it. Later, Randy threatens to kill him if he talks to Ruthie again. Stella, the bar owner, reveals she rescued Ruthie as a toddler from Devil's Crest. At the bar, Banks tries to link Person to Neely's murder and 75 mysterious disappearances from Baker.

Person sees Randy has stolen his suitcase. He drives to a junkyard with his gun, finding Randy has tied Ruthie up. During an armed standoff, Person convinces Randy to let Ruthie and him go by threatening to shoot her. Later, Ruthie comes to Person's room to tell him Randy was arrested, and they have sex. Randy then kidnaps Person, but before Randy can shoot him, Cowboy shoots Randy. Going back to the motel, Person finds suitcases stacked in his room. Cowboy, taking Grace hostage, tells him to drive them to the Devil's Crest lakebed. Person goes to Devil's Crest and meets Bob the Indian, who tells him where and how to arrange the suitcases before leaving.

Cowboy arrives with a group in blue tracksuits, similar to Neely's, including Ruthie. Cowboy pulls out a pair of size-11 bowling shoes from the bag and offers them to Person as a chance to join him to Paradise. Refusing, Cowboy gives them to Ruthie. She excitedly invites Person, but he declines. Cowboy shoots a flare and insists he is simply a cowboy, even as his skin turns blue and translucent. As the flare explodes, Person blacks out. He awakens alone on the dry lakebed. All of the suitcases are empty except for a locked one, which he takes. At the highway, he meets Grace, who says he has been missing for three days and gives him a key from Cowboy. He finds his $28K in the case.

Back in Los Angeles, Banks interrogates Person. Unable to tell the truth to the families of those disappeared, Banks invents a story. Person sees a band-aid on Banks' neck, similar to the one that appeared on his own neck after Devil's Crest, relating to one of Dan's conspiracy theories. As Person and Grace go on a date at a bowling alley, she congratulates him for getting a supporting role in a film. She quotes Cowboy with bright blue eyes. Person, wearing size-11 shoes, rolls a ball down the alley; his eyes turn bright blue, too. The bowling ball rolls across the vast moonlit Devil's Crest. Far in the distance white flames, like the Cowboy's flare, rise from the desert floor.

== Cast ==
- Jon Favreau as John Person; an out-of-work actor, and the story's protagonist.
- Joey Lauren Adams as Grace; John's friend, who lives across the hall from him.
- Bud Cort as Neely; John's strange neighbor who convinces John Person to deliver the suitcase to Baker, California.
- Jon Gries as Elron; the manager of the Royal Hawaiian Motel in Baker. He is irritatingly peppy.
- Daryl Hannah as Stella; the bartender at the local bar. She is an easygoing, urbane woman who helps John out.
- Rachael Leigh Cook as Ruthie; Stella's adopted daughter. She wants to leave Baker to see the world, and is attracted to John's good and supportive nature.
- Adam Beach as Randy; Ruthie's boyfriend. He has an obsession with Ruthie, and reacts violently if anyone so much as looks at her. He is psychopathic and threatens to kill John, first with a chainsaw and later with a shotgun.
- Brent Briscoe as Dan; a trucker who is always at the diner.
- Sean Bean as Cowboy; a mysterious person to whom John Person needs to deliver the suitcase.
- Kelsey Grammer as FBI Agent Banks; an FBI agent who suspects John has a role in the unusual occurrences in Baker.
- Gary Farmer as Bob "Indian Bob"; a sarcastic Native American who guides John Person to the "jump point" in the dry lake bed.
- Melora Walters as Candy; a hooker who works for the motel where John Person is staying.

== Locations ==
The Big Empty was all shot on location in Los Angeles and Baker, California, which is a real town in southern California where most of the story takes place. Many of its locations are real, including the Royal Hawaiian Motel. Several landmarks in Baker are also shown, including the world's tallest thermometer. The Alto Nido apartments where John Person is living are the same ones where William Holden lived in the beginning of Sunset Blvd. All the bowling scenes were filmed at the famous Hollywood Star Lanes in Hollywood. It has since been demolished.

== Reception ==
On Rotten Tomatoes the film has an approval rating of 67% based on reviews from 6 critics.

Kevin Thomas of the Los Angeles Times gave the film a positive review, saying it "Has a seductive easiness (which may not be for everyone, but it works), a laid-back yet ever-so-slightly portentous score and a wonderful sense of place." Chuck Wilson of L.A. Weekly wrote: "More amiable than laugh-out-loud funny, the film pokes along, buoyed by the motel's bright Hawaiian color scheme, and a moonlit desert finale that's awfully pretty." Robert Koehler of Variety wrote: ""Hobbled by uninspired stabs at cleverness and surreal narrative curlicues, The Big Empty goes nowhere, replete with a question mark of an ending that isn't worth answering."
