= La Femme Nikita: Music from the Television Series =

La Femme Nikita: Music From The Television Series

Soundtrack album by Various
- Released: June 16, 1998
- Recorded: Various dates
- Genre: Soundtrack
- Label: TVT

La Femme Nikita Original Soundtrack is the soundtrack album series for the television series.

== Track listing ==
1. Mark Snow – "Main Title"
2. Enigma – "Beyond the Invisible"
3. Mono – "Silicone"
4. Depeche Mode – "The Love Thieves"
5. Morcheeba – "Fear and Love"
6. Hednoize – "Loaded Gun"
7. DJ Krush featuring Deborah Anderson – "Skin Against Skin"
8. Beverly Klass – "Temple"
9. Afro Celt Sound System – "Inion/Daughter"
10. Curve – "Chinese Burn"
11. Vibrolux – "Drown"
12. Morphine – "Hanging on a Curtain"
13. Fluke – "Absurd"
14. GusGus – "Gun"
15. DJ Keoki – "Majick" (Cirrus Remix)
