= South Florida Folk Festival =

South Florida Folk Festival is an annual music and arts festival in Fort Lauderdale, Florida, United States sponsored by the Broward Folk Club.
