= The F-Word (book) =

1995 book by lexicographer J. Sheidlower

- Author: Jesse Sheidlower
- Language: English
- Genre: Non-fiction
- Publisher: Random House
- Publication date: 1995

The F-Word is a book by lexicographer and linguist Jesse Sheidlower surveying the history and usage of the English word fuck and a wide variety of euphemisms that replace it. Sheidlower examines 16th and 17th century poetry, 20th century literature, and 21st century media uses of the word.

The book was first published in 1995 by Random House, which also published the second edition in 1999. Oxford University Press published a revised and expanded third edition in 2009, featuring a foreword by comedian Lewis Black.
