= Jesse Sheidlower =

American lexicographer (born 1968)

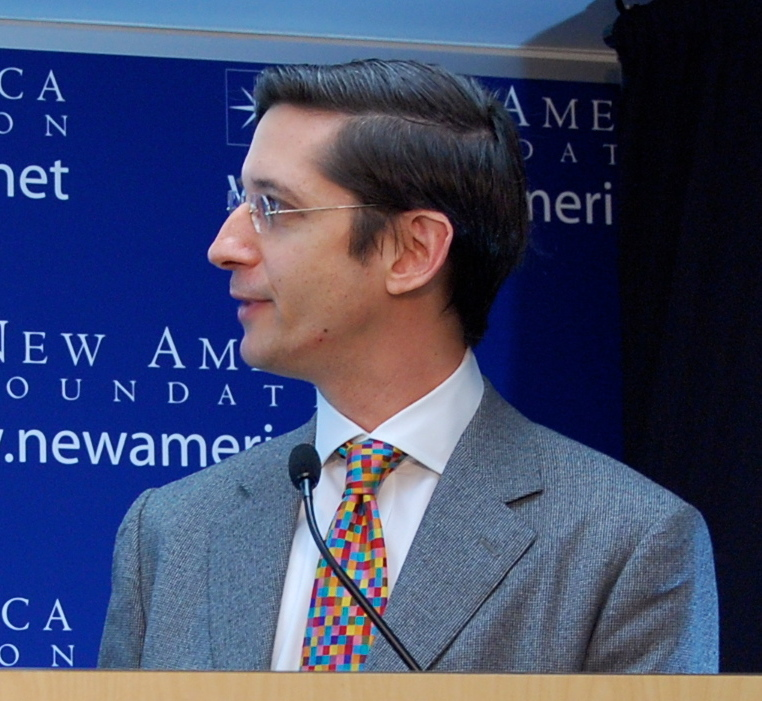
- Born: Long Island, New York

Academic background
- Education: University of Chicago; Cambridge University

Academic work
- Discipline: Lexicography
- Institutions: Columbia University
- Notable works: The F-Word, Historical Dictionary of Science Fiction
- Website: jessesword.com

Jesse Sheidlower (Note: /ˈʃaɪd.laʊər/; the syllables rhyme with "side hour".) (born August 5, 1968) is a lexicographer, editor, author, and programmer. He is past president of the American Dialect Society, was the project editor of the Random House Dictionary of American Slang, and is the author of The F-Word, a history of the word "fuck". He is also a former editor-at-large at the Oxford English Dictionary. New York Magazine named him one of the 100 smartest people in New York, and he serves as a judge for the annual "literary-celeb-studded" Council of Literary Magazines and Presses spelling bee. Sheidlower is employed as an adjunct assistant professor at Columbia University.

Sheidlower was a language consultant for Amazon's adaptation of Philip K. Dick's The Man in the High Castle, and in January 2021, he launched the Historical Dictionary of Science Fiction, a website tracing the origin of terms in science fiction literature.

== Biography ==
Sheidlower attended the University of Chicago. He was interested in astrophysics as a child and intended to major in science, but switched to classics and English. After graduating from Chicago, he studied early English in the department of Anglo-Saxon, Norse and Celtic at Cambridge.

Although not a computer programmer by training, Sheidlower introduced Perl to the North American offices of Oxford University Press and developed tools for data manipulation when no programmers were available. He is also one of the core developers of Catalyst, a popular Perl web development framework.

From 1996 to 1999 Sheidlower worked for Random House as a senior editor, where he initiated their "Word of the Day" internet page, answering questions about lexicography. In 1999, the Oxford English Dictionary hired him to manage their newly opened North American Office, based in Old Saybrook, Connecticut. From 1999 until 2005, Sheidlower was Principal North American Editor at the Oxford English Dictionary; then until 2013 he was editor-at-large focusing on North American usage.

While at the OED he managed the Science Fiction Citations project, a program to capture citations of science fiction words such as "alien", "robot", and "cyberspace". The project began in 2001 and was hosted at Sheidlower's personal website. In 2021, Sheidlower launched the Historical Dictionary of Science Fiction website, an expansion of the earlier Citations project.

Sheidlower is an expert amateur cook and collects both cookbooks and bar paraphernalia; Food & Wine Magazine has written about his "famous Manhattan dinner parties". He is one of the two proprietors of the Threesome Tollbooth, a cocktail bar in Williamsburg, New York, which is only large enough for the bartender and two guests. He has been consulted on both the linguistics and logistics of the well-tailored suit.

Sheidlower has written against the censorship of obscenities in news coverage and court cases, arguing that a reliance on euphemisms can impede accurate reporting, deprive readers of integral information, and obscure the realities of racism, sexism, and homophobia.

== Works ==
- The F-Word, 1995
- Jesse's Word of the Day, 1998
