= The Full Monty (disambiguation) =

The Full Monty is a 1997 British comedy film.

The Full Monty may also refer to:

- The Full Monty (soundtrack), the soundtrack from the film
- The Full Monty, a 1998 novelization of the film by Wendy Holden (author, born 1961)
- The Full Monty (musical), a 2000 musical based on the film
- The Full Monty (play), a 2013 play based on the film
- The Full Monty (TV series), a follow-up to the 1997 film
- The full monty, a British slang phrase (basis for the title of the other works listed)

A series of celebrity special TV programmes inspired by the film have also been produced commencing in the United Kingdom in 2017, with the franchise format subsequently repeated in several other countries, under the name The Real Full Monty.
