= Mufti (dress) =

Clothing worn in private or civil life, especially by those otherwise in uniform

In British English and some Commonwealth dialects of English, mufti is plain or ordinary clothes, especially when worn by one who normally wears, or has long worn, a military or other uniform, such as a school uniform. It is also called civies and civvies (slang for "civilian attire").

== Origins ==
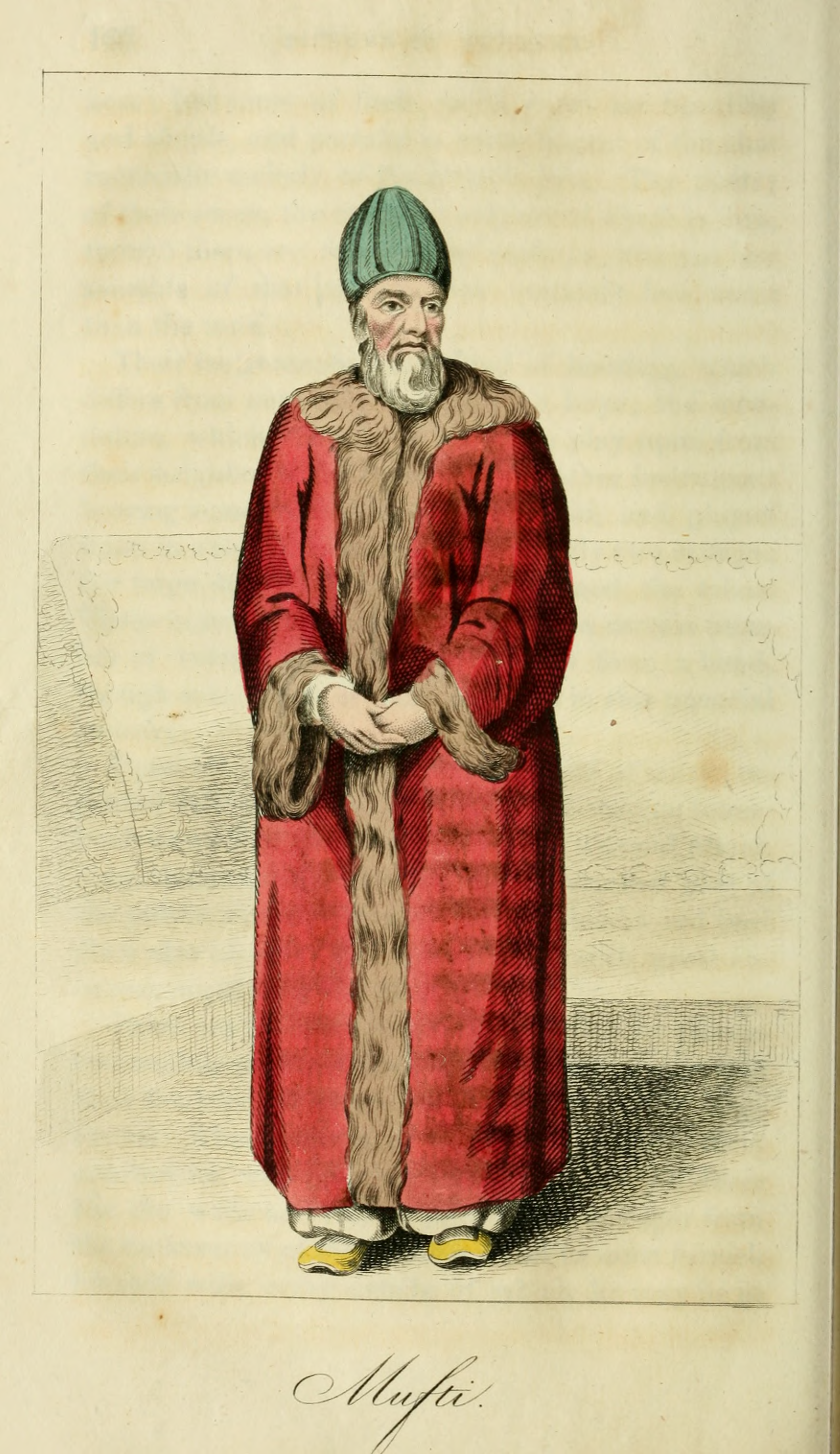
An Algerian mufti. The term as it relates to the wearing of non-uniform clothes is thought to have originated from the Arabic.

The word originates from the Arabic mufti (مفتي), meaning an Islamic scholar. It has been used by the British Army since 1816 and is thought to derive from the vaguely Eastern style dressing gowns and tasselled caps worn by off-duty officers in the early 19th century. Yule and Burnell's Hobson-Jobson (1886) notes that the word was "perhaps originally applied to the attire of dressing-gown, smoking-cap, and slippers, which was like the Oriental dress of the Mufti".

Another possibility for the origin of the use of the word mufti in the context of school clothes is that the word is taken from Urdu, in which muft (مفت) means 'free (of charge)', originated from Persian.

== Mufti day ==
A "mufti day" (also known as "casual clothes day", "casual Friday", "colour day", "own-clothes day", "home-clothes day", "plain-clothes day", "non-uniform day", "free-dress day", "civvies day", "dress-down day", and "uniform-free day") is a day where students attend school in casual clothing instead of school uniform. The term is commonly used in multiple different countries where students are required to wear uniform, incl. the United Kingdom, Ireland, Fiji, Australia, India, Pakistan, Bangladesh, New Zealand, South Africa and Nigeria.

By extension, the term is used in reference to the practice of wearing "smart casual" attire to the office instead of business suits or other conventional clothing. Australia takes this even further, where even if a suit or smart-casual attire is the norm, "Mufti Fridays" allow employees to wear jeans, a polo shirt or even a t-shirt.

== New Zealand ==
A school in New Zealand dropped the term because New Zealand's Human Rights Commission claimed that use of the word to mean non-uniform dress represents an "appropriation" and that the "appropriation has a history of degradation and racism."

Writes New Zealand historian Katie Pickles:

It appears that officers started dressing in robes and slippers that they slightly mockingly thought resembled garments worn by Mufti. This happened at a time when, with the objective of rendering them obsolete and powerless, the authority of Mufti in India was being extinguished.

From there, the British Army started using the word “mufti” for their days out of uniform when they wore loose and comfortable clothing (including dressing gowns). One culture’s power dressing was another’s play clothes.

We can now interpret the development of mufti as a classic example of cultural appropriation and othering during the height of British imperialism.

== See also ==
- Demob suit
