= Burton's, Abergavenny =

Historic site in Wales

Burton's
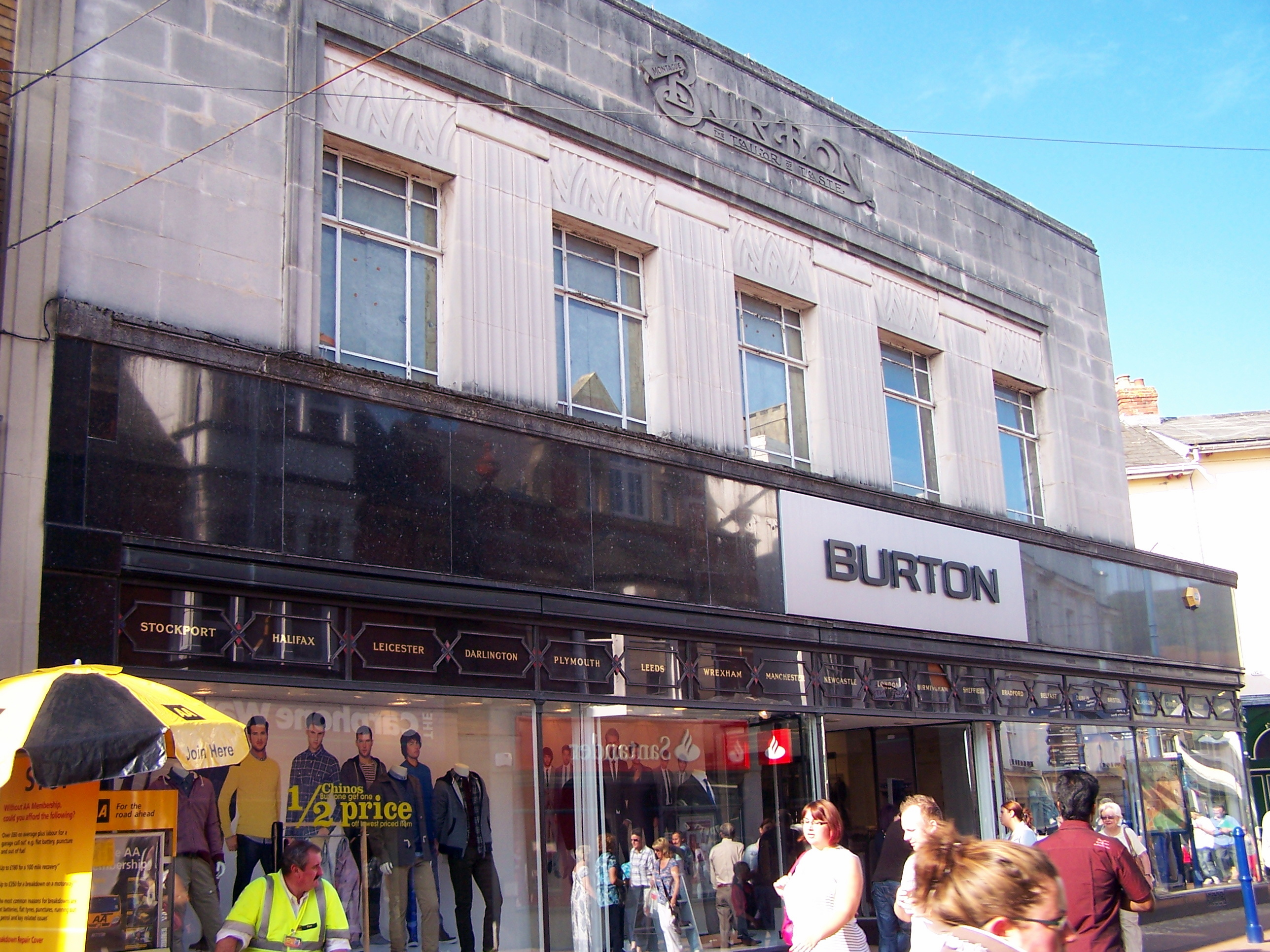
- "A classic Burton store"

- Location within Monmouthshire
- 51.8221°N 3.0180°W
- Location: 16–18 High Street Abergavenny, NP7 5RY, Monmouthshire, Wales, United Kingdom

History
- Built: 1937
- Built for: Sir Montague Maurice Burton

Site notes
- Architect: Nathaniel Martin

Listed Building – Grade II*
- Designated: 13 October 1994
- Reference no.: 14875

Burton's, 16–18 High Street, Abergavenny, Wales, is a shop constructed for the Burton's tailoring company in 1937. The design, by Burton's in-house architect, Nathaniel Martin, is Art Deco in style. The building is listed Grade II* for its "exceptional interest and rarity as a well preserved Burton's store which retains almost all of its 1930s external detailing."

== History and architecture ==
The Burton clothing company was founded by Montague Burton in 1903. Originally named the Cross-Tailoring Company, the business grew to become the world's largest tailoring company by Burton's death in 1952. During rapid expansion in the 1920s and 1930s, fuelled in part by contracts to supply uniforms to the British Army throughout World War I, Burton established a distinctive architectural template for his stores nationwide. Using an in-house architectural team, led firstly by Harry Wilson and then by Nathaniel Martin, the stores were constructed in an Art Deco style, "the uncompromising moderne of the Burton house style (being) used in every store in the land."

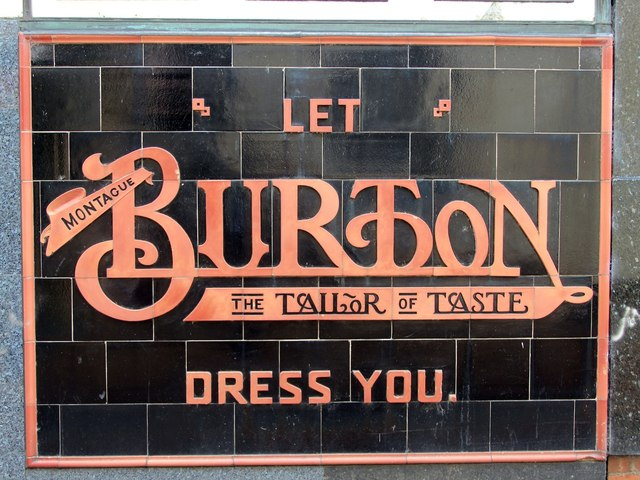
Sign on the Nevill Street frontage.

The building on High Street, Abergavenny is of two storeys with wide glass elevations to both the Market Street and High Street frontages. The building materials include Portland stone, polished black marble, brass and glass. A foundation stone records; "This stone laid by Raymond Montague Burton 1937". The store has an exterior that is almost unchanged since its construction in 1937 and, as such, it represents a rare survival of a commercial style that was once common through the United Kingdom. The building has a Grade II* listing in acknowledgement of this rarity. Its Cadw listing describes it as "a classic Burton store with all the characteristic design features which used to be displayed in every British town and have now gone almost completely".

Burton closed the store in the early 21st century. In 2018, redevelopment work on the building was halted by Monmouthshire County Council over concerns that historic architectural features were being damaged. In 2019, the retailer Mountain Warehouse took a ten-year lease on the site.
