= Burton (retailer) =

British online clothing retailer

Burton Online Limited
- Trade name: Burton Menswear
- Formerly: Burton Trading Limited
- Company type: Subsidiary
- Founded: 1903; 123 years ago
- Founder: Sir Montague Maurice Burton
- Headquarters: London, W1; United Kingdom
- Area served: United Kingdom
- Key people: Daniel Finley (Chief Executive Officer)
- Owner: Burton Group (1929-1998); Arcadia Group (1998-2021); Debenhams Group (2021-)
- Website: burton.co.uk

Burton Online Limited (trading as Burton Menswear) is a British online clothing retailer, former high street retailer and clothing manufacturer, specialising in men's clothing and footwear. It is operated by Debenhams Group in the United Kingdom.

Previously, Burton was a constituent of the FTSE 100 Index, but became a trading name of Arcadia Group Brands Ltd, part of the Arcadia Group. Sir Philip Green acquired the Arcadia Group in 2002, and it became the sole owner of Burton. In 2021, Boohoo Group (now Debenhams Group) acquired the brand after Arcadia went into administration.

== History ==
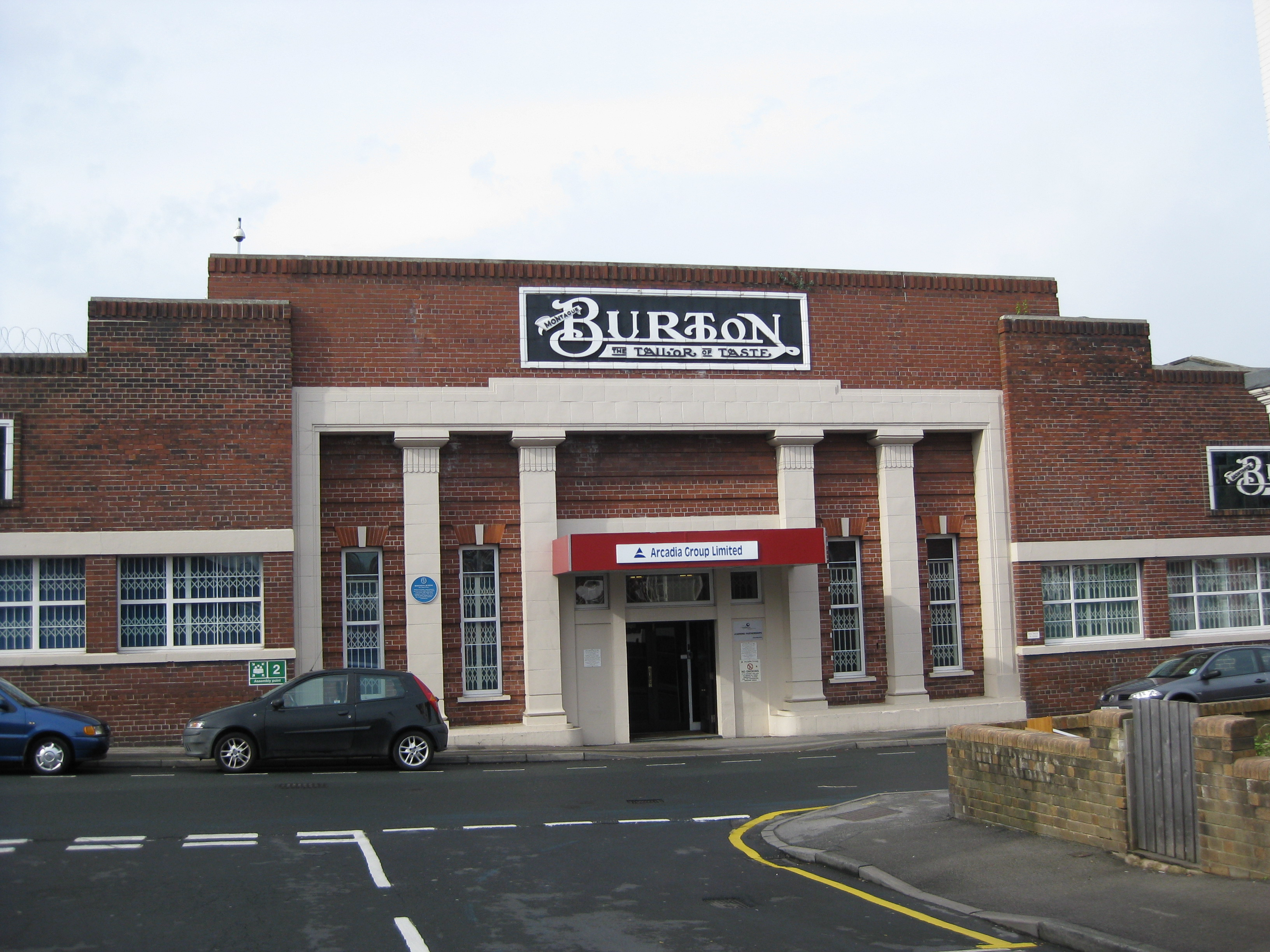
The Burtons factory in Burmantofts, Leeds, is now used only as a warehouse

The company was founded by Sir Montague Maurice Burton in Chesterfield in 1903 under the name of The Cross-Tailoring Company. It was first listed on the London Stock Exchange in 1929 by which time it had 400 stores, factories and mills.

After World War II, Montague Burton was one of the suppliers of demob suits to the British government for demobilising servicemen, comprising jacket, trousers, waistcoat, shirt and underwear. It has been speculated that this is the origin of the phrase "the full monty". In 1946, the company acquired the Peter Robinson department store chain. Montague Burton died in 1952. By this time, the company was the largest multiple tailor in the world.

The company expanded by purchasing various other brands, including competitors until it was split from Debenhams in 1998. At this time Burtons became a brand name, and the Arcadia Group name took over as the group name.

The companies purchased or merged with were:

- 1954 – Jackson the Tailor
- 1979 – Dorothy Perkins
- 1984 – Harry Fenton
- 1985 – Debenhams
- 1986 – John Collier

Burton was the official clothing supplier to the England national football team for the 1966 FIFA World Cup, UEFA Euro 1996 and the 2002 FIFA World Cup championships. In 1998 the company changed its name to Arcadia Group.

Philip Green purchased the company in 2002.

The Burton company archives are held at the West Yorkshire Archive Service in Leeds.

In July 2020, Arcadia Group, which comprised several brands including Burton, had been hit hard by the COVID-19 lockdown and planned hundreds of job cuts to minimise costs. As financial difficulties worsened, Arcadia entered administration on 30 November 2020. In February 2021, Boohoo.com announced it was buying the Burton brand from Arcadia (along with the Wallis and Dorothy Perkins brands) for £25.2 million, with the loss of around 2,450 jobs. All Burton stores closed as the company became an online only retailer.

== Architecture ==
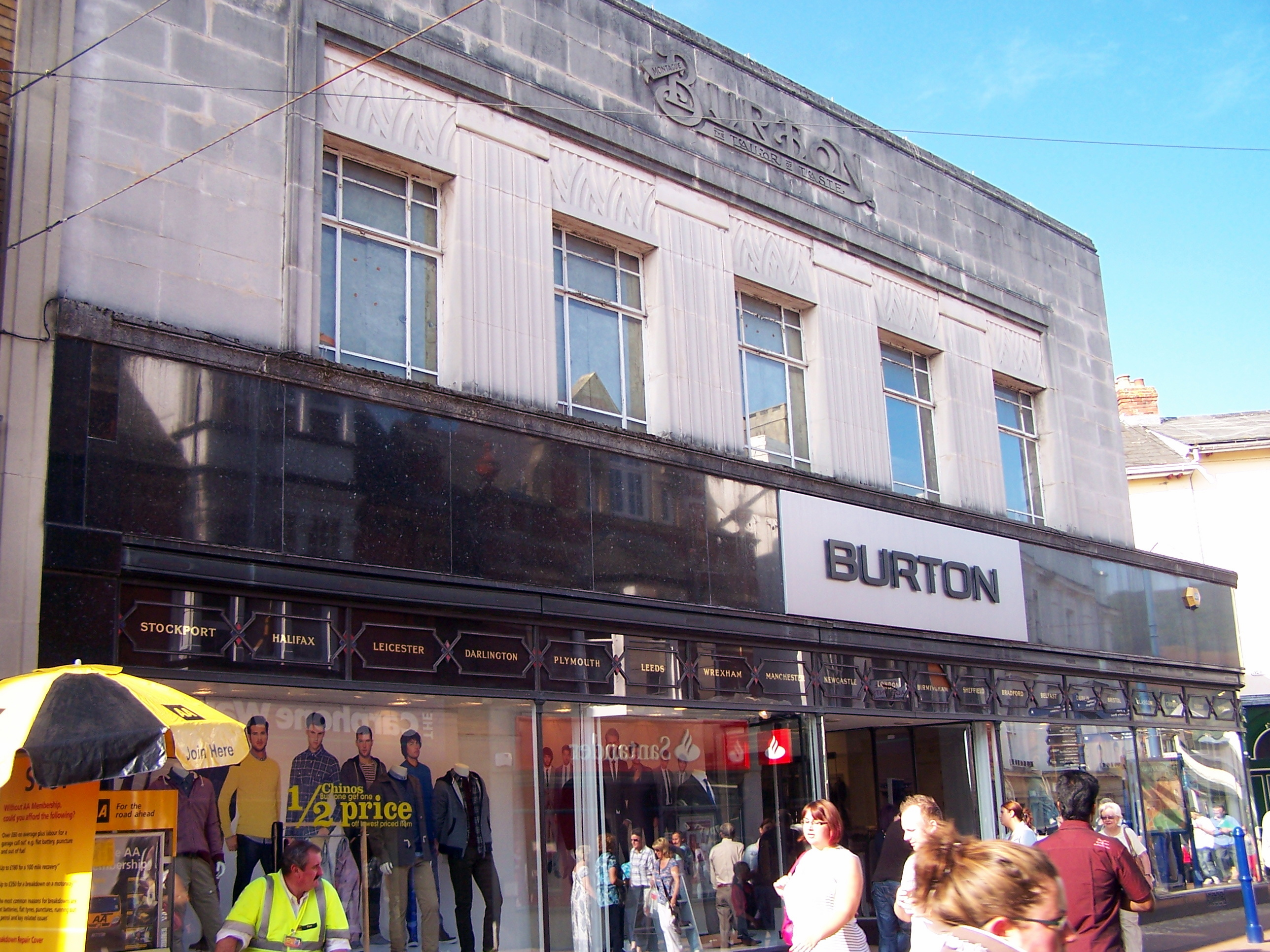
Art Deco Burton store in Abergavenny

Beginning in 1923, Burton began to acquire freehold sites in order to build its own custom designed stores. Prominent town centre corner sites were preferred and the shops often moved a few doors along the same street in order to acquire the corner site. Leeds-based architect Harry Wilson was hired at this time and developed the Burton "house style" building design. In 1931 Burton took over Wilson's practice to make it the in-house architecture department. Wilson was replaced as chief architect by Nathaniel Martin in 1937.

This Burton in-house architecture was Art Deco in style. Individual stores vary from the more restrained red-brick with neoclassical scroll headed columns to fully-fledged Art Deco with glazed white faience tile, geometric patterns and stylised elephant heads. However, there are also many standard elements such as a wide polished black granite band above the shop windows for signage, metal vent grates bearing the company logo, billiard halls on the upper levels, window lights showing the locations of other Burton stores, and mosaic titles – sometimes including the company logo – in the doorways.

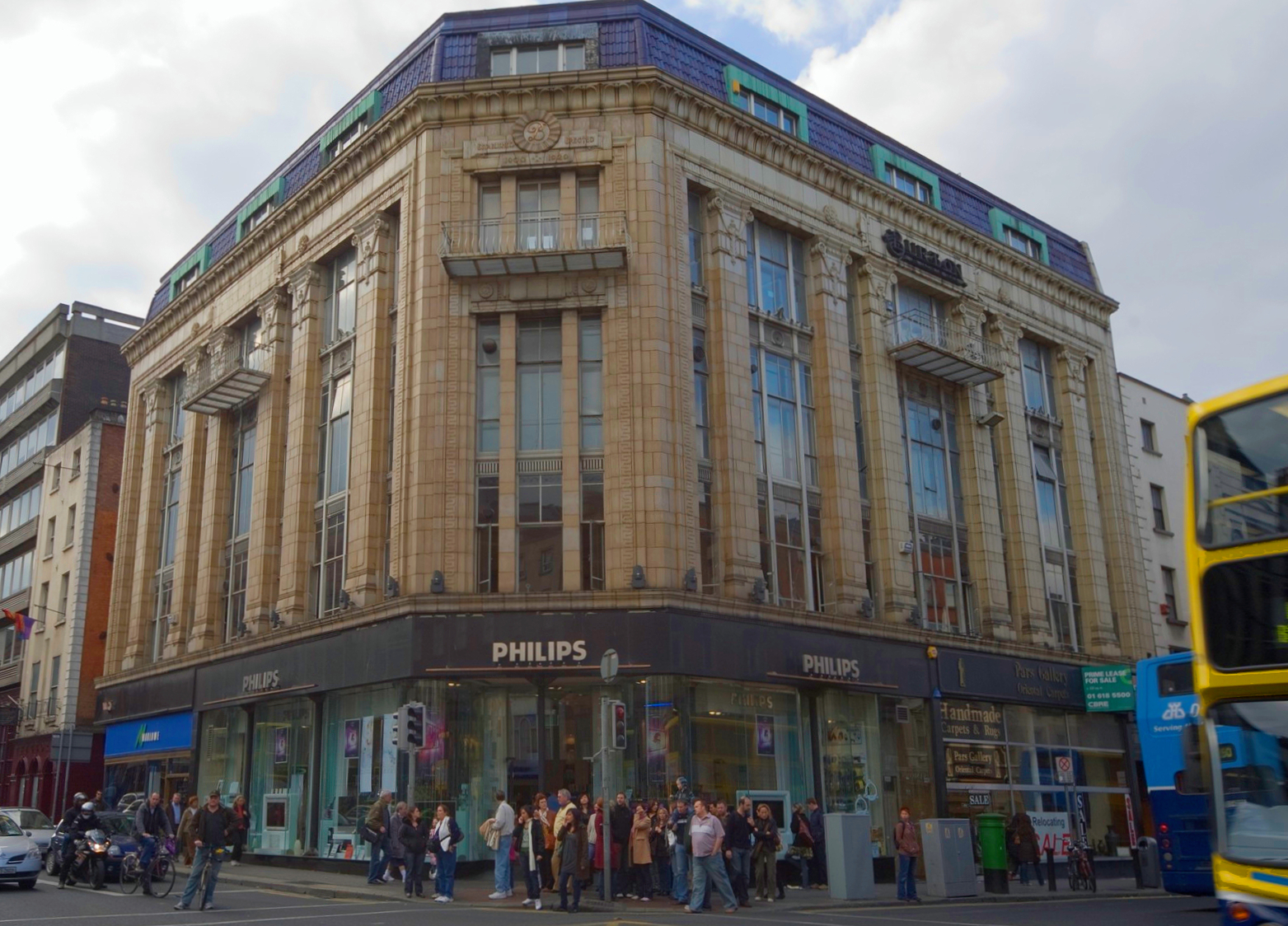
The Montague Burton Building in Dublin is on the city's list of protected structures.

At ground level, foundation stones were often placed by Montague Burton's four children, Barbara, Stanley, Arnold and Raymond. Each store might have one or several foundation stones, each bearing one name and the year. For example: "This stone laid by Raymond Montaque Burton 1937". The children were quite young when these stones were laid. Stanley Howard was born in 1914 and laid a stone for the Nottingham Beastmarket Hill store in 1924. At least six stores bear stones laid by Montague's wife "Lady Burton", and a number in the mid to late 1930s were laid by Austin Stephen Burton who may have been a grandchild.

Whilst some of these Burton buildings have been destroyed over the years, many are still standing and some of them still have active snooker clubs upstairs. Some were still occupied by Burton stores at the time of Arcadia's closure in 2020 (often a combined Burton and Dorothy Perkins store) but many others had changed use. McDonald's first three restaurants in the UK were opened in former Burton stores in 1974 and 1975 as the company was selling property at that time.

Most of the Scottish stores are listed with Historic Environment Scotland, protecting them from changes. (Note: Listed Scottish stores include Aberdeen, Aberystwyth, Kirkcaldy, Paisley) However, only six stores in England and Wales are listed buildings, (Note: Listed stores in England and Wales include Abergavenny and Camden.) leaving over 200 with no protection from future changes or demolition. As of 2021, stores have been demolished in Plymouth (2004) and Neasden (2012).

An early Dublin Burton's store was housed in the purpose-built Montague Burton Building on the corner of Dame Street and South Great George's Street. It is now on the city's list of protected structures.

== Charitable activities ==
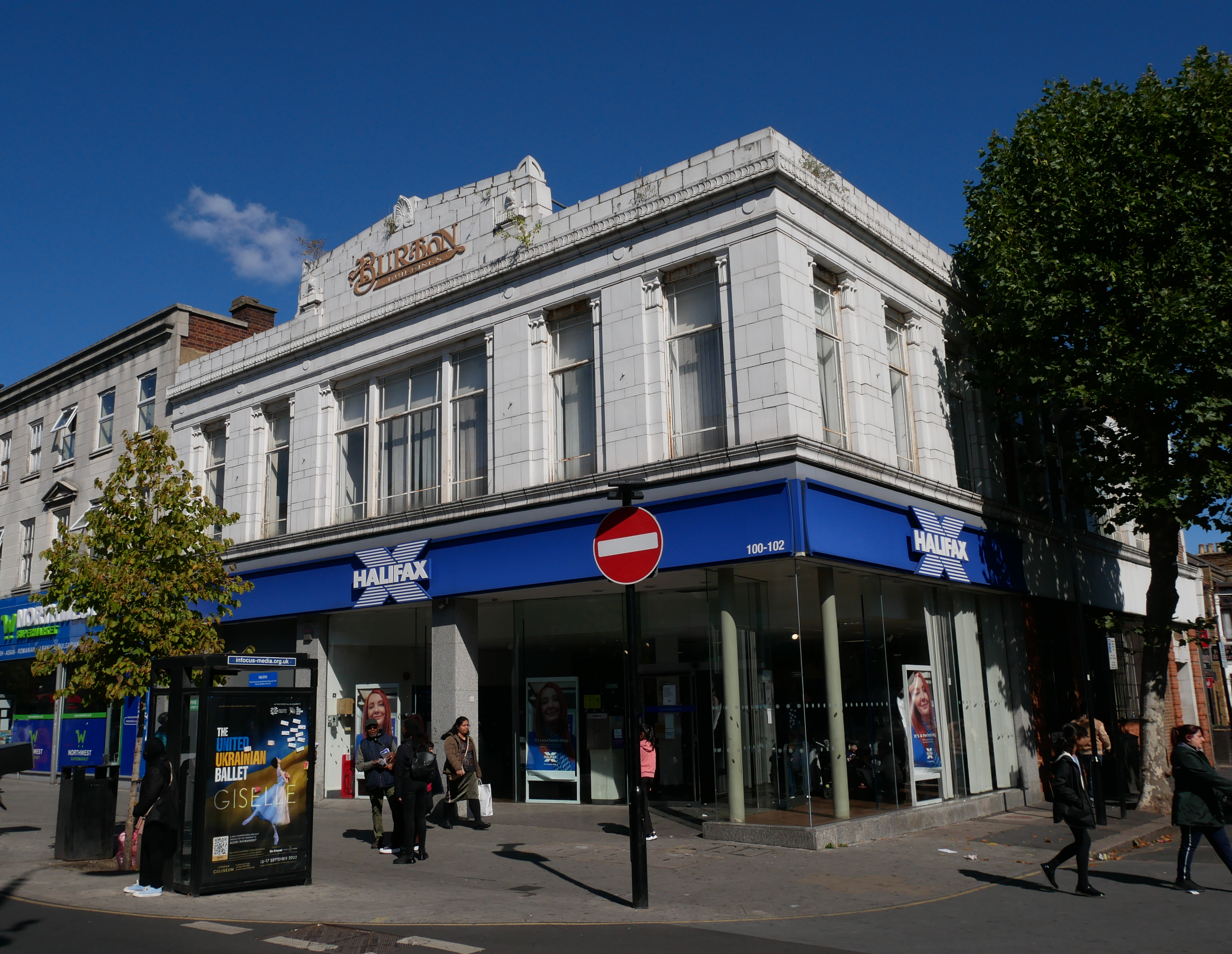
The purpose-built Burton store in East Ham, east London

Burton has worked with the Bobby Moore Fund in order to publicize the issue of bowel cancer. England's World-Cup-winning football team captain Bobby Moore died of bowel cancer in 1993. The Bobby Moore Fund is an arm of Cancer Research UK.

In November 2009, Burton sought to bring back "The Burton", a style of moustache worn by founder Montague Burton, through their support of the Movember campaign in order to raise money for The Prostate Cancer Charity. The "Burton" moustache was styled upon two influential moustache types, the English and the Handlebar.
