= Ball of Wax =

Ball of Wax may refer to:

- Ball of wax
- Ball of wax example, a thought experiment of René Descartes
- Ball of Wax, a song in early productions of Ghost the Musical
- Ball of Wax, a 2008 episode of Tak and the Power of Juju (TV series)

== See also ==
- The whole ball of wax
