= The Full Monty (musical) =

Musical by Terrence McNally and David Yazbek

- Music: David Yazbek
- Lyrics: David Yazbek
- Book: Terrence McNally
- Basis: The Full Monty by Simon Beaufoy
- Productions: 2000 San Diego (tryout); 2000 Broadway; 2001 North American tour 2002 West End; 2002 North American tour
- Awards: Drama Desk Award for Outstanding Music

The Full Monty is a musical with book by Terrence McNally and score by David Yazbek.

In this Americanized musical stage version adapted from the 1997 British film of the same name, six unemployed Buffalo steelworkers, low on both cash and prospects, decide to present a strip act at a local club after seeing their wives' enthusiasm for a touring company of Chippendales. As they prepare for the show, working through their fears, self-consciousness, and anxieties, they overcome their inner demons and find strength in their camaraderie.

== Plot ==
While relocated to Buffalo, New York, the musical closely follows the film.

=== Act I ===
In depressed Buffalo, New York, the once-successful steel mills have grown brown with rust, rolling equipment has been removed, and the lines are silent. Best friends Jerry Lukowski and Dave Bukatinsky, along with the other unemployed mill workers, collect unemployment checks and ponder their lost lives ("Scrap"). Elsewhere, Dave's wife Georgie and her friends are celebrating their newfound independence and wealth as the sole earners of their families by attending a Chippendales performance ("It's a Woman's World").

While hiding in the bathroom of the strip club, Jerry and Dave hear how unhappy Georgie is over Dave's insecurities (in part because of his weight) and Pam, Jerry's ex-wife, laments the loss of her marriage and her plans to take court action against him for the child support payments that he's failed to make since losing his job. Compromising the situation further is Jerry's son, Nathan, who reluctantly spends time with him; he has grown tired of his father's seeming lack of motivation.

After talking to the stripper in the Chippendales act, Jerry and Dave are intrigued by the women's willingness to pay for a striptease act. Jerry is convinced that his ship has finally come in: he decides to organize a similar act of his own, with the intent to earn enough money to pay for his child support obligations ("Man").

The first to join the act is gauche and lonely Malcolm, a security guard at the steel mill where Dave and Jerry once worked. Malcolm tries to commit suicide by asphyxiating himself in his car through carbon monoxide poisoning. Dave pulls him out, and Jerry and Dave discuss various methods to commit suicide ("Big-Ass Rock"). Malcolm ultimately joins in and with the reassurance of his new-found friends behind him, he joins the fledgling lineup. His rescue and inclusion in the group gives him a newly optimistic and confident outlook on life. He also starts to grow more independent from his domineering, invalid mother, Molly.

Next on Dave and Jerry's list is their former foreman, the middle-class aspirant Harold Nichols, who is taking a ballroom dance class with his immaculately groomed wife, Vicki. While Harold explains that he has concealed his unemployment from his materialistic wife, Vicki blithely sings about their marriage ("Life with Harold"). Dave and Jerry tell him of their scheme; with literally no options left, Harold agrees to be the act's choreographer.

In a sequence of scenes, former co-workers perform strip-tease auditions. One of the auditionees is invited to sit down after he flunks; he declines, saying that his children are outside waiting 'in the car' and that 'this is no place for kids' before glancing over at Nathan before leaving. Other auditioners are, hired: Noah 'Horse' Simmons, for his comprehensive dance knowledge (while overlooking evidence of advanced arthritis), and Ethan Girard, who longs to dance like Donald O'Connor in Singin' in the Rain and has a jaw-dropping, euphemism-inducing penis ("Big Black Man"). They are also joined by Jeanette Burmeister, a tough, seen-it-all showbiz musician who "shows up, piano and all" to accompany the boys' rehearsals.

Elsewhere, Dave contemplates his weight and Harold contemplates Vicki's spending habits ("You Rule My World"). At the first rehearsal, Harold feels the men are hopeless, but Jerry fires them up, encouraging them to think of it not as dance, but as sports moves ("Michael Jordan's Ball").

=== Act II ===
As the men practice, doubts continue to creep in about whether this is the best way to make some money, due to their individual insecurities over their appearances. Jeanette is particularly straightforward ("Jeanette's Showbiz Number").

Requiring a deposit at the club, Jerry tries to get seed money from Pam, which she denies. Nathan eventually provides some college funds, and Jerry is moved by Nathan's growing belief in his father ("Breeze Off the River").

Later, as the men are rehearsing at Harold's house, they undress in front of each other for the first time, and have nightmare visions that the women of the town will find them inadequate ("The Goods"). They are interrupted by repossessors who are scared off by the scantily clad men; their mutual friendships continue to grow.

During a dress rehearsal, the boys get literally caught with their pants down wearing thongs, causing Jerry, Horse, Harold, Jeanette, and Nathan to be brought into a police station. Malcolm and Ethan successfully escape, and fall into a homoerotic embrace after they climb through the window of Malcolm's house. They are interrupted by the sudden illness of Molly.

After Pam tearfully picks up Nathan ("Man (Reprise)"), the boys are brought together at the funeral of Malcolm's mother, where he is joined by Ethan in subtly announcing their relationship ("You Walk with Me"). Later, the men are approached on the street by local women acquaintances who have heard of their show. Jerry declares that their show will be better than the Chippendales dancers because they'll go "the full monty"—strip all the way. Dave, meanwhile, quits less than a week before the show, deprecating himself as a 'fat bastard' whom no one would want to see in the nude—including his wife, Georgie.

Their secret out, all seems lost for the members of Hot Metal—their "stage name". But Georgie and Vicki reconfirm their love for their husbands despite their failures ("You Rule My World (Reprise)"). It is also revealed the arrest publicity has spiked ticket sales.

With not much left to lose, and a sold-out show, the men decide to go for it for one night, including Harold, who has finally gotten a job. Dave finds his confidence and joins the rest of the group, but Jerry has a last minute loss of his. Nathan convinces him to go on and he joins the boys for the final performance. With the support of friends, family, and townspeople, the boys perform one final show ("Let It Go").

== Productions ==
=== Original Broadway production ===
The Full Monty had its world premiere at the Old Globe Theatre in San Diego from June 1 through July 9, 2000. The show opened on Broadway at the Eugene O'Neill Theatre on October 26, 2000, and closed on September 1, 2002, after 770 regular performances and 35 previews. The production was directed by Jack O'Brien and choreographed by Jerry Mitchell, with musical direction by Ted Sperling, sets by John Arnone, lighting by Howell Binkley, sound design by Tom Clark, and costumes by Robert Morgan. The opening night cast included Patrick Wilson as Jerry, John Ellison Conlee as Dave, Marcus Neville as Harold, Jason Danieley as Malcolm, André De Shields as Horse, Romain Frugé as Ethan, Lisa Datz as Pam, Annie Golden as Georgie, Emily Skinner as Vicki, and Kathleen Freeman as Jeanette.

=== Original West End production ===
The musical premiered in the West End at the Prince of Wales Theatre on March 12, 2002, and closed on November 23, 2002. The cast included original Broadway cast members Jason Danieley, André De Shields, John Ellison Conlee, Romain Frugé and Marcus Neville, with Jarrod Emick as Jerry and Dora Bryan as Jeanette. The production won the London Evening Standard Theatre Award for Best Musical.

=== Subsequent international productions ===
The Full Monty has been played in Australia, Canada, Czech Republic, Denmark, Finland, France, Germany, Greece, Iceland, Israel, Italy, Japan, Mexico, Netherlands, Philippines, Singapore, South Africa, South Korea, Spain, Sweden, the United Kingdom, and the United States, and has been translated into multiple languages.

From October 16, 2001, through February 3, 2002, The Full Monty ran at the Teatre Novedades in Barcelona, being the first time the show was seen in Europe. Directed by Mario Gas and translated to Catalan by Roser Batalla and Roger Peña, the cast included Marc Martínez as Jerry, Dani Claramunt as Dave, Xavier Mateu as Harold, Àngel Llàcer as Malcolm, Miquel Àngel Ripeu as Horse, Xavier Mestres as Ethan, Roser Batalla as Pam, Mercè Martínez as Georgie, Mone as Vicki, and Carme Contreras as Jeanette.

In 2003, the musical was translated to Danish and played at the closed-down Tuborg Brewery bottling plant in Copenhagen, and the story was changed to the men being let off from Brewers. The role of Jerry (renamed Jesper in Danish) was played by the actor/comedian Peter Mygind. The musical ran from October 30 until December 20, 2003.

An Australian production opened at the State Theatre in Melbourne on 6 January 2004 (after previewing from 31 December 2003), featuring Matt Hetherington, David Harris, Paul Mercurio, Michael Veitch, Queenie van de Zandt and Val Jellay. It was not commercially successful, with the Melbourne season closing early and a Sydney season cancelled.

A production opened in the Czech Republic in Liberec in 2005. The show translated literally as Donaha! is currently played in 3 different theatres in Czech Republic.

In South Korea, the musical was performed in Korean at 'Yeon-gang Hall' (theatre) in Seoul, from November 25, 2006, to February 25, 2007. Comedian Jeong Jun-ha (as Dave) was one of the cast.

A South African production starring Judy Page as Janet Burmeister, played in Cape Town (Artscape Theatre) and Johannesburg (The Johannesburg Civic Theatre) from July through October 2008. The production was nominated for Best Musical and Judy Page won the Naledi Theatre Award for best Actress in a Musical. It was directed by David Bowns and produced by Johan Kruger for Creativentertainment.

In regional theatre, the Paper Mill Playhouse, Millburn, New Jersey presented the musical in June–July 2009, starring Elaine Stritch as Jeanette.

A production directed by Thom Southerland ran at the Broadway Studio in Catford, South East London, in November 2009 and then transferred to the Off West End at the New Players Theatre from December 3, 2009, through January 2, 2010.

In 2013, a French adaptation was produced by TV producer Gilles Ganzmann, and played for a short time on stage in Paris. Although it was short-lived, it got rave reviews. The book and most of the songs were adapted in French by Nathaniel Brendel. A couple songs were adapted by Baptiste Charden. The show was choreographed by Fauve Hautot.

A Philippine version was staged at the RCBC Plaza starring Mark Bautista, Arnel Ignacio, Marco Sison, OJ Mariano, and Jamie Wilson.

In 2017, a revival was staged at the National Theatre in Melbourne, Australia. The cast featured mostly local actors, as well as special guest appearances (during certain performances) from Australian Idol finalist Rob Mills, AFL footballer Brodie Holland, and radio presenter Anthony "Lehmo" Lehmann. The show ran from March 3 through March 19.

A Spanish language production opened on October 27, 2021 at the Teatro Rialto in Madrid, with Samuel Gómez as Jerry, Falco Cabo as Dave, José Navar as Harold, Gustavo Rodríguez as Malcolm, Piñaki Gómez as Horse, Carlos Salgado as Ethan, Marta Arteta as Pam, Silvia Villaú as Georgie, Begoña Álvarez as Vicki, and Marta Malone as Jeanette.

=== Cancelled 2027 Broadway Revival ===
On April 16, 2026, Roundabout Theatre Company announced that they would be producing the show's first Broadway revival as part of their 2026-2027 season, with Leigh Silverman attached to direct. The production was scheduled to open at the Todd Haimes Theatre on April 25, 2027.

On October 15, 2026, it was announced that the production has been postponed indefinitely due to cast availability.

== Song list ==
Act I

- "Scrap" – Jerry, Dave, Malcolm, Ethan, Men
- "It's a Woman's World" – Georgie, Susan, Joanie and Estelle
- "Man" – Jerry and Dave
- "Big-Ass Rock" – Jerry, Dave and Malcolm
- "Life with Harold" – Vicki
- "Big Black Man" – Horse, Jerry, Dave, Harold, Malcolm, Nathan
- "You Rule My World" – Dave, Harold
- "Michael Jordan's Ball" – Jerry, Dave, Harold, Horse, Malcolm, Ethan

Act II

- "Jeanette's Showbiz Number" – Jeanette, Dave, Horse, Harold, Malcolm, Ethan, Jerry
- "Breeze Off the River" – Jerry
- "The Goods" – Jerry, Horse, Dave, Harold, Malcolm, Ethan, Women
- "You Walk with Me" – Malcolm and Ethan
- "You Rule My World" (Reprise) – Georgie and Vicki
- "Let It Go" – Ethan, Dave, Harold, Malcolm, Horse, Jerry, Company

== Original casts ==
Character	Broadway (2000)	North American tour (2001)	West End (2002)	North American tour (2002)
Jerry Lukowski	Patrick Wilson	Rod Weber	Jarrod Emick	Christian Anderson
Dave Bukatinsky	John Ellison Conlee	Daniel Stewart Sherman	John Ellison Conlee	Michael J. Todaro
Harold Nichols	Marcus Neville	Steven Skybell	Marcus Neville	Robert Westenberg
Malcolm MacGregor	Jason Danieley	Danny Gurwin	Jason Danieley	Geoffrey Nauffts
Noah "Horse" T. Simmons	André De Shields	Larry Marshall	André De Shields	Cleavant Derricks
Ethan Girard	Romain Frugé	Chris Diamantopoulos	Romain Frugé	Christopher J. Hanke
Pam Lukowski	Lisa Datz	Carol Linnea Johnson	Julie-Alanah Brighten	Whitney Allen
Georgie Bukatinsky	Annie Golden	Susann Fletcher	Gina Murray	Jennifer Naimo
Vicki Nichols	Emily Skinner	Andréa Burns	Rebecca Thornhill	Heidi Blickenstaff
Jeanette Burmeister	Kathleen Freeman	Kaye Ballard	Dora Bryan	Carol Woods
Nathan Lukowski	Nicholas Cutro; Thomas Michael Fiss	Bret Fox; Brett Murray	Joseph Tremain	Bret Fox; Brett Murray

== Accolades ==
=== Original Broadway production ===
Year	Award Ceremony	Category	Nominee	Result
2001	Tony Award	Best Musical		Nominated
2001	Tony Award	Best Book of a Musical	Terrence McNally	Nominated
2001	Tony Award	Best Original Score	David Yazbek	Nominated
2001	Tony Award	Best Performance by a Leading Actor in a Musical	Patrick Wilson	Nominated
2001	Tony Award	Best Performance by a Featured Actor in a Musical	John Ellison Conlee	Nominated
2001	Tony Award	Best Performance by a Featured Actor in a Musical	André De Shields	Nominated
2001	Tony Award	Best Performance by a Featured Actress in a Musical	Kathleen Freeman	Nominated
2001	Tony Award	Best Direction of a Musical	Jack O'Brien	Nominated
2001	Tony Award	Best Choreography	Jerry Mitchell	Nominated
2001	Tony Award	Best Orchestrations	Harold Wheeler	Nominated
2001	Drama Desk Award	Outstanding Musical		Nominated
2001	Drama Desk Award	Outstanding Book of a Musical	Terrence McNally	Nominated
2001	Drama Desk Award	Outstanding Actor in a Musical	Patrick Wilson	Nominated
2001	Drama Desk Award	Outstanding Featured Actor in a Musical	John Ellison Conlee	Nominated
2001	Drama Desk Award	Outstanding Featured Actor in a Musical	André De Shields	Nominated
2001	Drama Desk Award	Outstanding Featured Actress in a Musical	Kathleen Freeman	Nominated
2001	Drama Desk Award	Outstanding Director of a Musical	Jack O'Brien	Nominated
2001	Drama Desk Award	Outstanding Choreography	Jerry Mitchell	Nominated
2001	Drama Desk Award	Outstanding Orchestrations	Harold Wheeler	Nominated
2001	Drama Desk Award	Outstanding Lyrics	David Yazbek	Nominated
2001	Drama Desk Award	Outstanding Music	David Yazbek	Won
2001	Drama Desk Award	Outstanding Lighting Design	Howell Binkley	Nominated
2001	Theatre World Award		Kathleen Freeman	Won

== See also ==
- The Full Monty (play), another stage adaptation of the film
