= Harry Fenton (retailer) =

British menswear store chain

Harry Fenton was a British menswear store chain.

The chain was predominantly in London, Essex and Kent, and there were 16 shops when it was acquired by Rael-Brook Holdings in 1962, and became a subsidiary of Wellpax Investments. In 1965, there were 63 shops. In 1972, English Calico sold Harry Fenton to Combined English Stores.

In the 1960s, they had central London stores at 62 Shaftesbury Avenue and later, 113 Oxford Street as well.

In 1980, the "Kevin Keegan Collection at Harry Fenton" was launched, a range of menwear modelled by the football player Kevin Keegan.

In 1984, the chain was bought by Burton.

Harry Fenton is in the permanent collection of the Victoria and Albert Museum, London.
