= Montague Burton Building =

Art Deco building in Dublin, Ireland

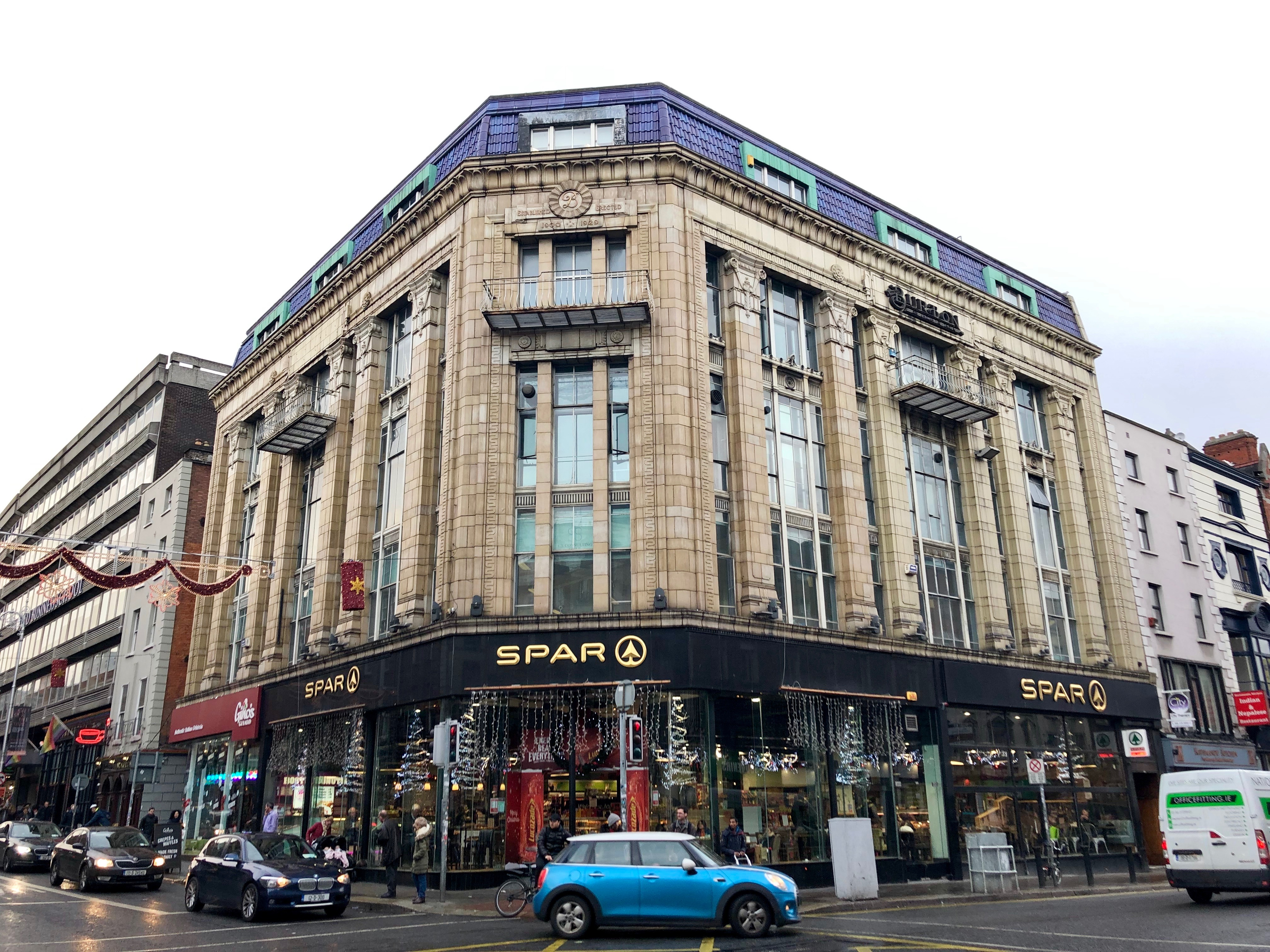
- The Montague Burton Building in 2018

- Location within Central Dublin

General information
- Type: Retail
- Architectural style: Art Deco
- Location: Dame Street, South Great George's Street
- Coordinates: 53.344047°N 6.264647°W
- Current tenants: SPAR
- Construction started: 1929
- Completed: 1930
- Client: Burton department store

Design and construction
- Architect: Harry Wilson

The Montague Burton Building is an Art Deco commercial building on the corner of Dame Street and South Great George's Street in Dublin, Ireland. It was constructed between 1929 and 1930 and designed by architect Harry Wilson.

Named after Montague Burton, the founder of the Burton department store chain, the building was originally home to an early Dublin branch of the menswear retailer. It later became a Philips electrical store.

As of 2023, it is home to a branch of SPAR that is known colloquially as "gay SPAR" by members of the city's LGBT community. This is because of its close proximity to The George, which is one of the city's oldest gay bars.

== Architecture ==
The building is typical of early 20th century Burton stores. Montague Burton was known for selecting prominent city centre corner sites. Leeds-based architect Wilson designed the Dublin store in the Burton in-house style, which was almost always Art Deco. The building is ornately decorated with faience tiles, ornamental capitals and a decorative cornice. This contrasts with the mainly restrained facades of Victorian and Georgian buildings on Dame Street and George's Street.

The building is an example of post-First World War retail development that makes use of wraparound shopfronts. Its roof, while having a mansard appearance from the street, is actually flat and incorporates five pyramid-shaped roof lights. The entire building is on the city's list of protected structures.
