= Demob suit =

Civilian clothes for a man upon demobilised after WWII

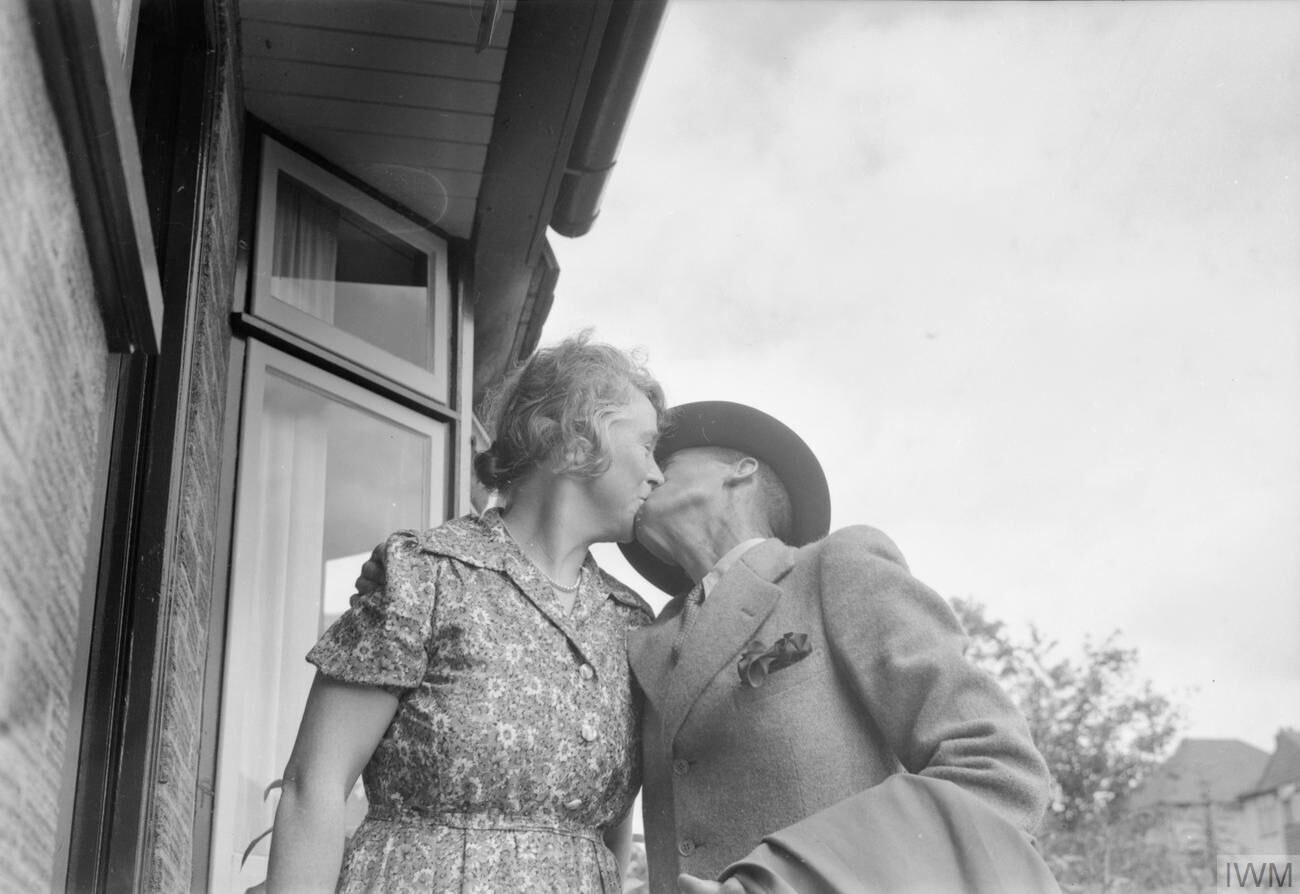
"Mr C Stilwell returns to his home in Farnham, Surrey, after being "demobbed", and is greeted by his wife." Ministry of Information, c. 1945.

A demob suit was a suit of civilian clothes given to a man on his demobilisation from the British armed forces at the end of the Second World War. Although the suits were of good quality, the need to clothe millions of demobilising servicemen led to supply problems that caused some men to receive suits that were not of the correct size. As a result, the demob suit became a common subject in British comedy in the post-war years.

== Etymology ==
The word "demob", short for demobilisation, came into use in the 1930s. Soldiers had received a set of civilian clothes on demobilisation at the end of the First World War. However, the phrase "demob suit" only came into common use at the end of the Second World War.

== Background ==
Beginning on 18 June 1945, millions of men were demobilised from the British armed services on a phased basis according to age and length of service. A set of civilian clothes was essential in order to help them integrate into civilian life and because they normally no longer had their original clothes after years in uniform. Clothes rationing meant that it was not possible to buy a new suit from a shop without a large quantity of ration coupons and a long delay while the suit was made.

Many separate demobilisation centres were run by the Army, Royal Navy and Royal Air Force, alongside Civilian Clothing Depots. Army centres were run by the Royal Army Ordnance Corps. One Royal Air Force centre was at Uxbridge.

== The suit ==
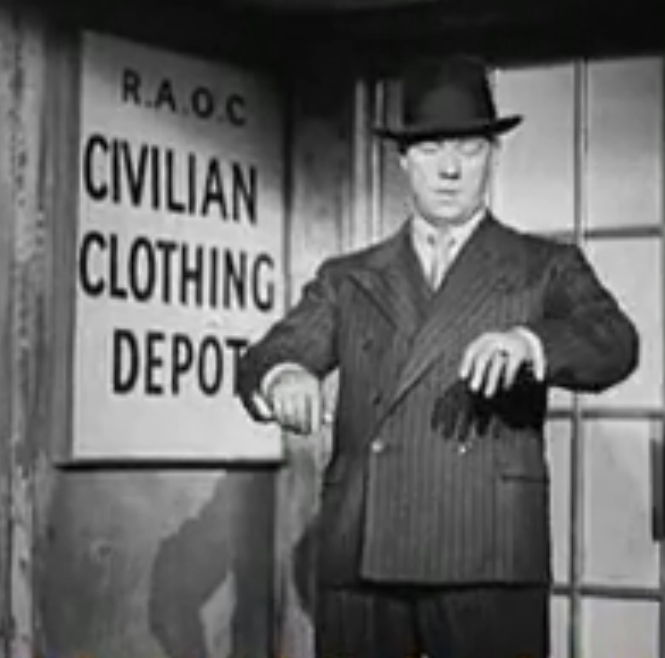
Some servicemen complained that their suit made them look like old-time gangsters.

At the demobilisation centre, men were issued with their civilian clothes. This was not in exchange for their service uniform which they were allowed to retain. The demob suit was just one part of a complete set of clothes. According to the Imperial War Museum, the full outfit included:

- A felt hat or optional flat cap
- A double-breasted pinstripe three-piece suit, or a single-breasted jacket with flannel trousers
- Two shirts and collars with matching collar studs
- A tie
- Shoes
- A raincoat

A variety of other items are sometimes said to have been supplied, the list varying according to the source, including gloves, underwear, socks, and bowler hats. In addition, men were given a special allocation of clothing coupons with which they could buy any extra items they might need, a special cigarette ration, and a one-way rail warrant. Men could keep their service uniform and many left the distribution centres in uniform with a small suitcase containing their demob clothes. Towards the end of 1945, around 75,000 demob suits were being made each week. One of the principal suppliers was Burtons, founded by Montague Burton, leading to speculation that the phrase the full monty, meaning "everything" or "a complete set", originated in reference to a full set of demob clothes supplied by the firm. Other manufacturers included the Fifty Shilling Tailors and Simpsons of Piccadilly.

Demob suits were made of the best quality material available in quantity at the time and were not utility clothes. However, problems with distribution meant that the right sizes were not always in stock when the clothes were fitted and the style of what was available was not always what men wanted. These problems made the demob suit the subject of much ridicule and humour. One soldier described his trousers as "unfriendly", saying "they kept their distance from my feet, in mourning at half mast". Another complained that his suit "looked as hostile and intimidating as the bloke pushing it my way".

Men had to make do with whatever was available when it was their turn to receive a suit. Occasionally, only odd sizes remained, though this could sometimes work in their favour as those with extreme measurements might be issued a bespoke suit, ordered and delivered by mail, which might be a better fit than one off-the-peg. The fact that certain versions were very common and easily recognised made some men feel that they had substituted one uniform for another. One remembered that he "walked proudly into town wearing my light grey pin-striped demob suit, looking around, I recognized all the ex-servicemen – they were all back in uniform – light grey pin-striped suits!". Others were embarrassed to wear the suits. One reported that he rarely wore his to work as "both the pattern and the hue made it difficult to hide its patriotic origins". Nonetheless, the suits were often the first that a man had owned and they remained in use for many years after the end of the war, being brought out whenever formal wear was required.

== Black market sales ==
Clothes rationing meant that there was plenty of demand for the suits and the other items on the black market. Spivs (small time criminals dealing in illicit goods) lurked outside distribution centres and offered men £10 for each set of clothes, which some accepted. Questions were asked in Parliament but the government could do nothing as the clothes belonged to the ex-servicemen as soon as they signed for them.

== Gallery ==
Official British Ministry of Information pictures of the demobilisation clothing depot, Olympia, London:

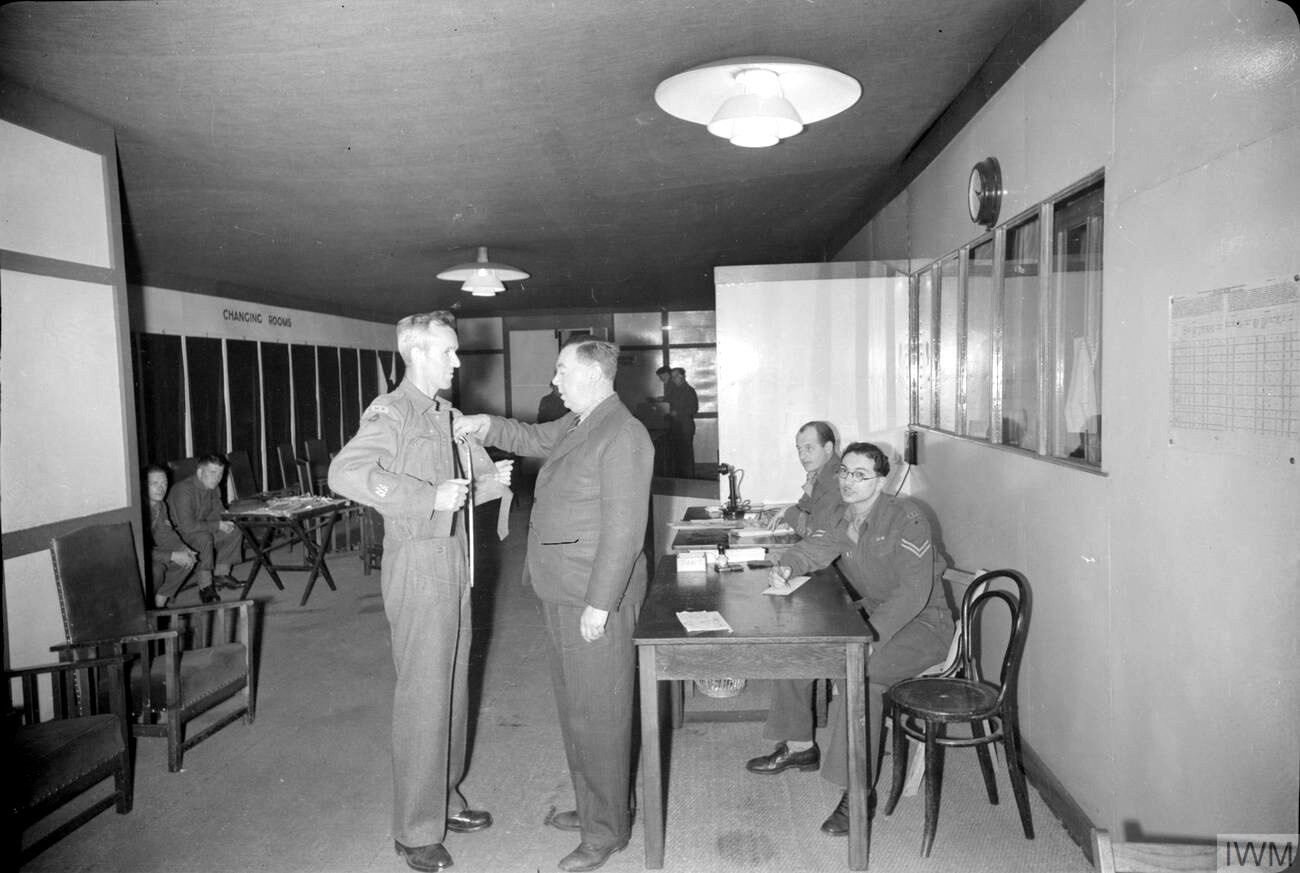
Regimental Sergeant Major Stilwell has his measurements taken for his demob suit by a tailor at the army's Demobilisation Clothing Depot at Olympia, London.

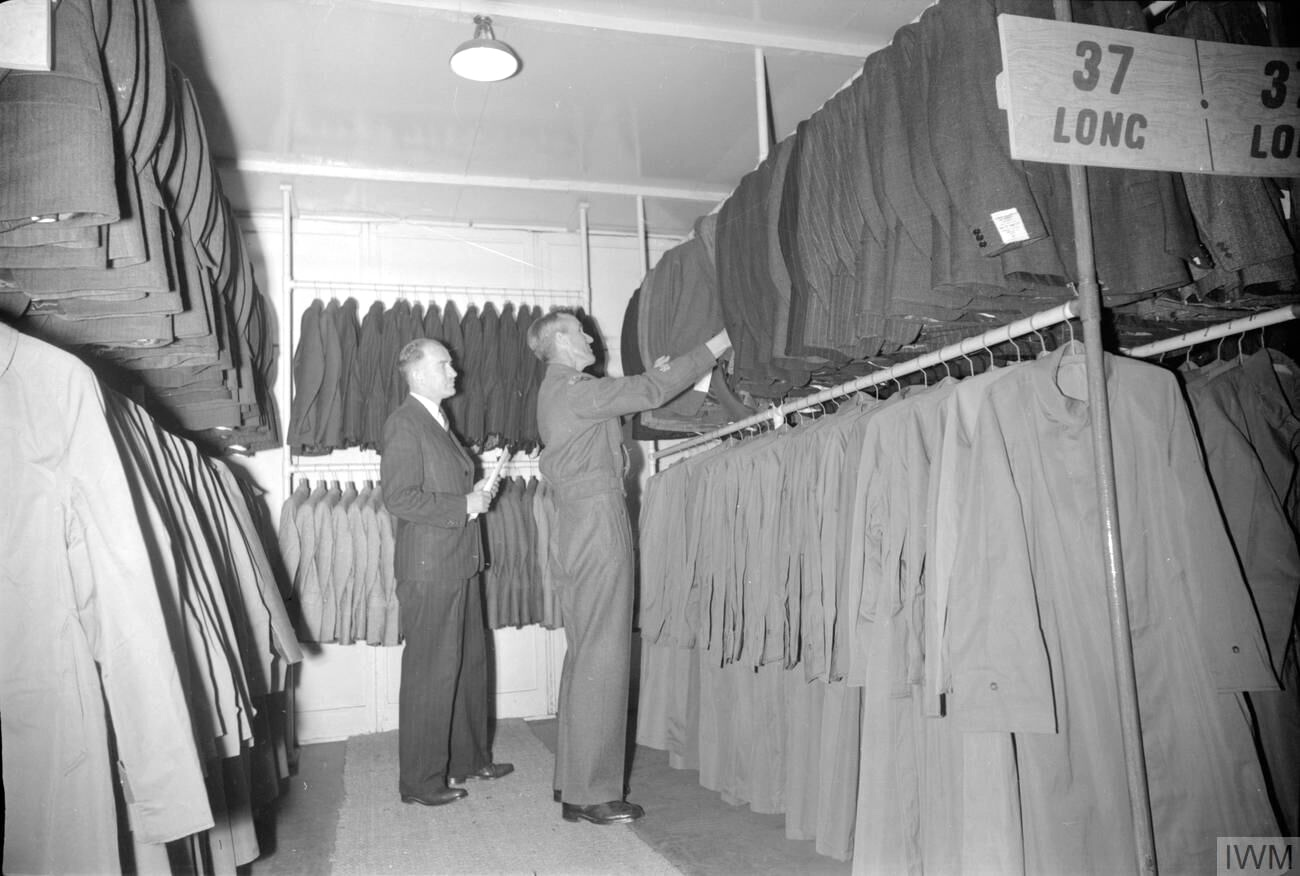
RSM Stilwell selects a jacket for a suit.

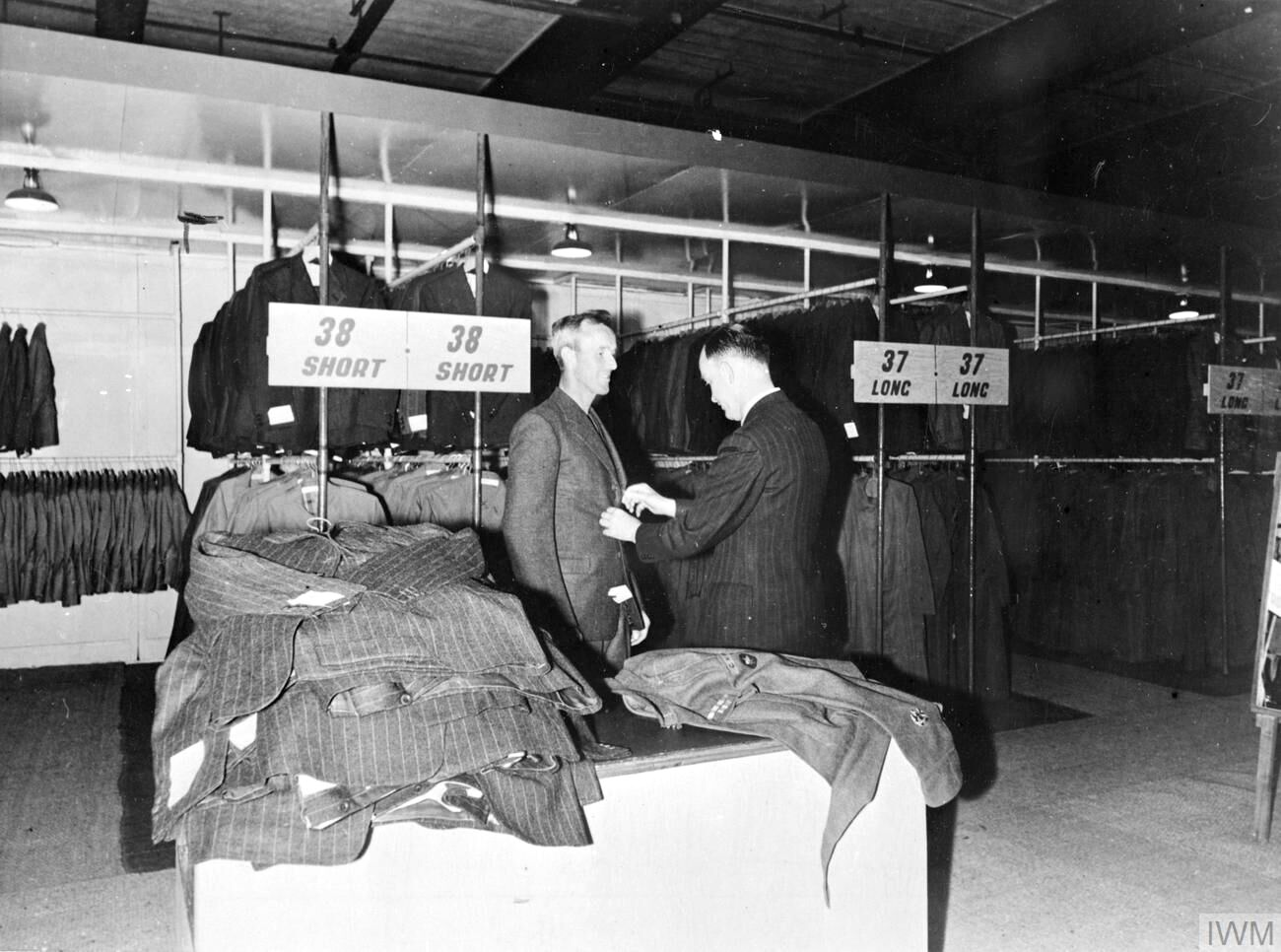
RSM Stilwell is fitted with his demob suit.

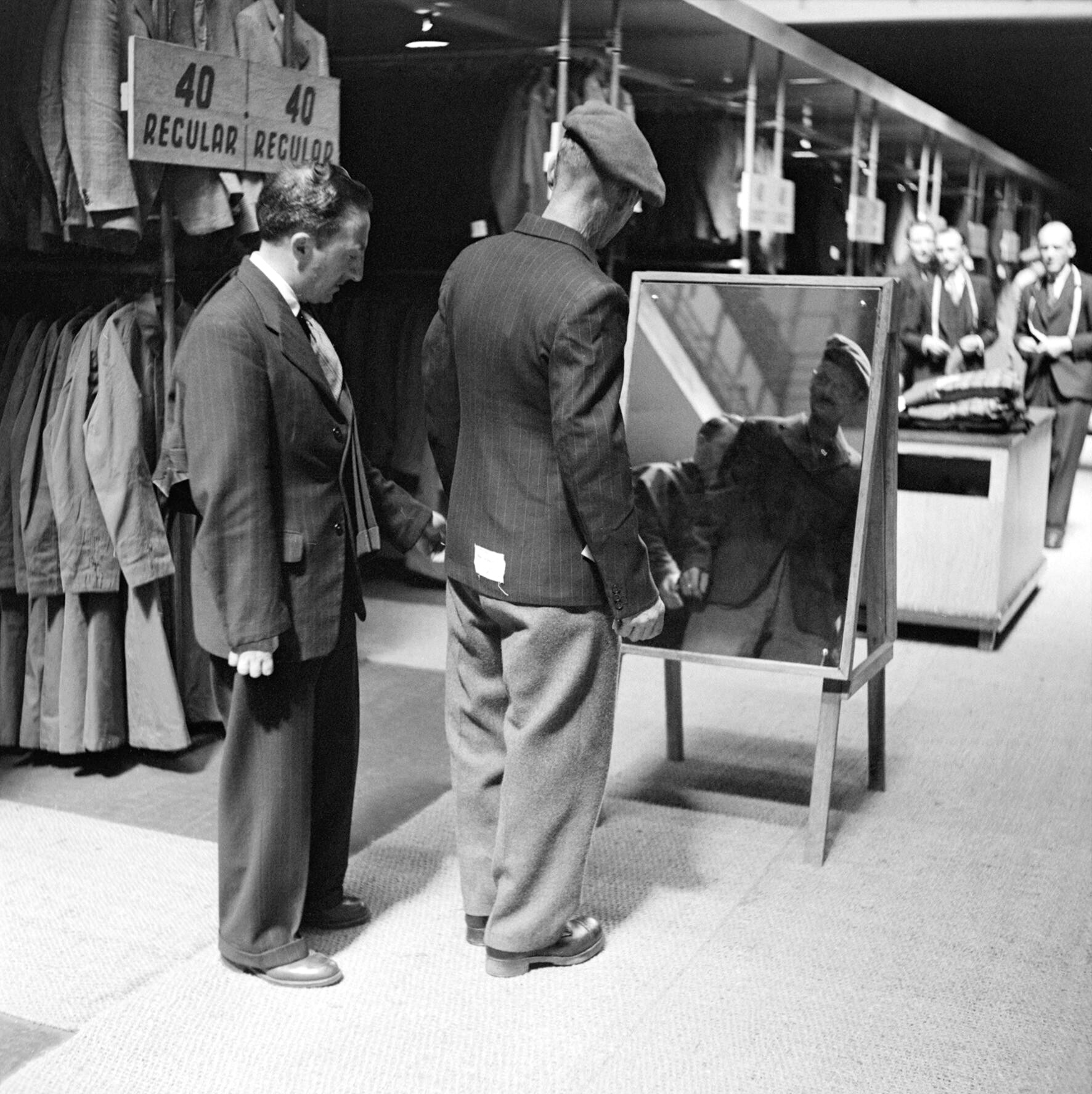
Private Bill Krepper of the Pioneer Corps is assisted in the selection of his demob suit.

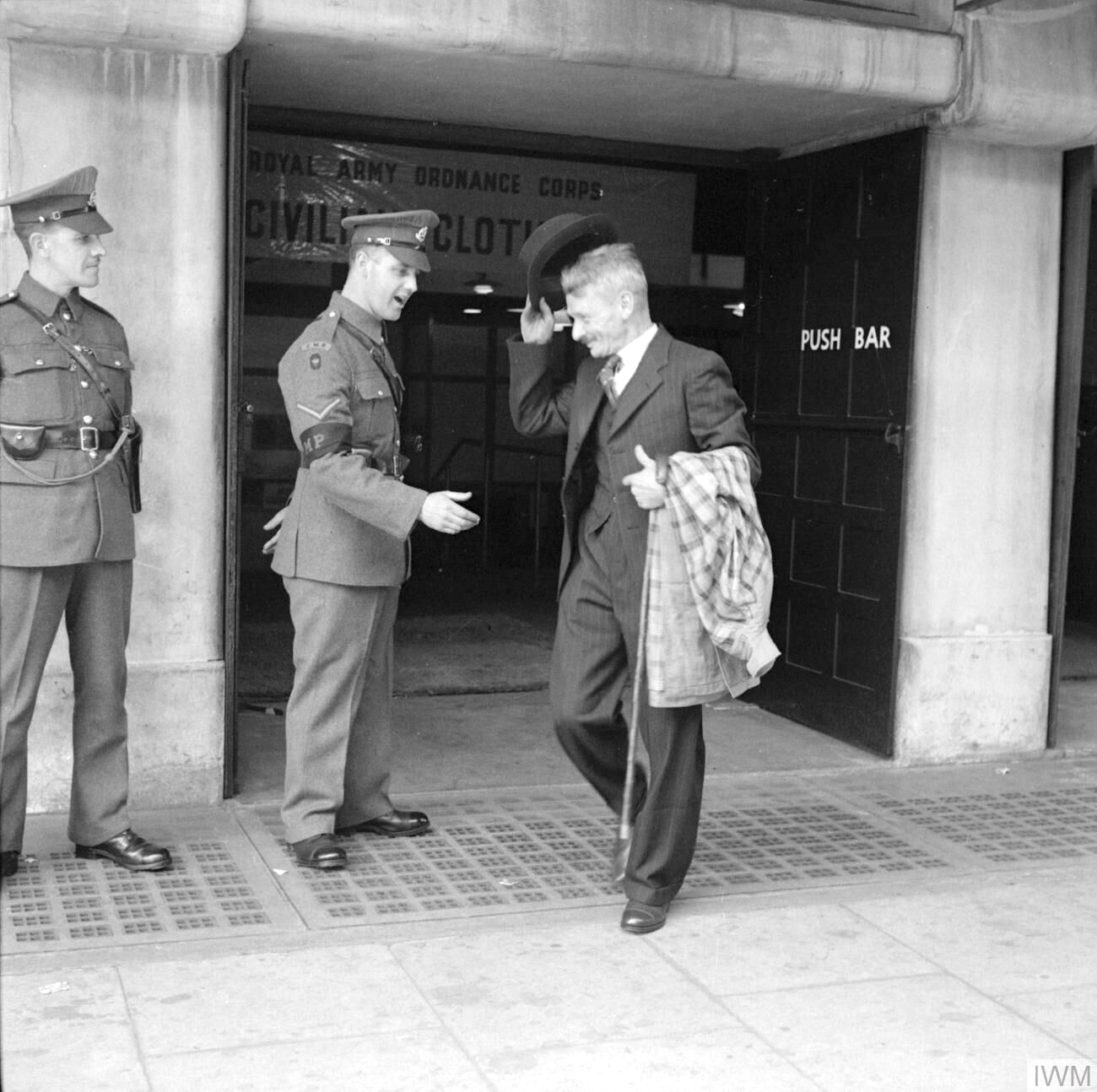
Mr Bill Krepper, late of the Pioneer Corps, leaves the demobilisation clothing depot at Olympia, London, wearing his demob suit.

== In fiction ==
J.B. Priestley titled his 1945 novel about three returning servicemen facing the challenges of post-war life, Three Men In New Suits. Anthony Powell, who had a military career during the war and may have gone through the process himself, used a scene set in the demob centre at Olympia as the conclusion to his 1968 novel The Military Philosophers, "Rank on rank, as far as the eye could scan, hung flannel trousers and tweed coats, drab mackintoshes and grey suits with a white line running through the material", asking whether the massed ranks of empty coats on their hangers somehow symbolised the dead.

== In comedy ==
The demob suit became a popular subject in British comedy after the Second World War as a topic to which millions of people could relate. There was obvious comic potential in a suit that was either too large or too small. The British physical comedian Norman Wisdom, whose suits were always too tight and who had been demobilised himself in 1946, was described by one critic as "Pagliacci in a demob suit". An obituary of Wisdom spoke of his "ill-fitting, half-mast demob suit". Frankie Howerd, one of a whole generation of British comedians who started their career immediately after demobilisation, performed in a badly fitting demob suit, probably because he had nothing else to wear.

== See also ==
- Demobilisation of the British Armed Forces after the Second World War
