= Montague Burton =

British businessman (1885–1952)

Sir Montague Burton
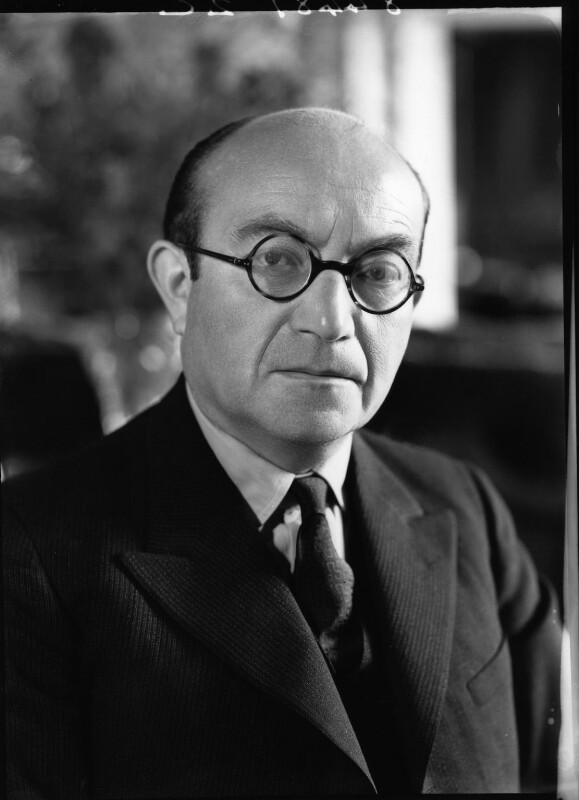
- Burton in 1938
- Born: Meshe David Osinsky; 15 August 1885; Kurkliai, Kaunas province, Russian Empire (now Lithuania)
- Died: 21 September 1952 (aged 67); Leeds
- Resting place: Stonefall Jewish Cemetery, Harrogate
- Occupations: Clothing manufacturer and retailer
- Known for: Founder of Burton Menswear
- Spouse: Sophia Amelia Marks
- Children: 3 sons and 1 daughter

Sir Montague Maurice Burton (15 August 1885 – 21 September 1952) was the founder of Burton Menswear, one of Britain's largest chains of clothes shops.

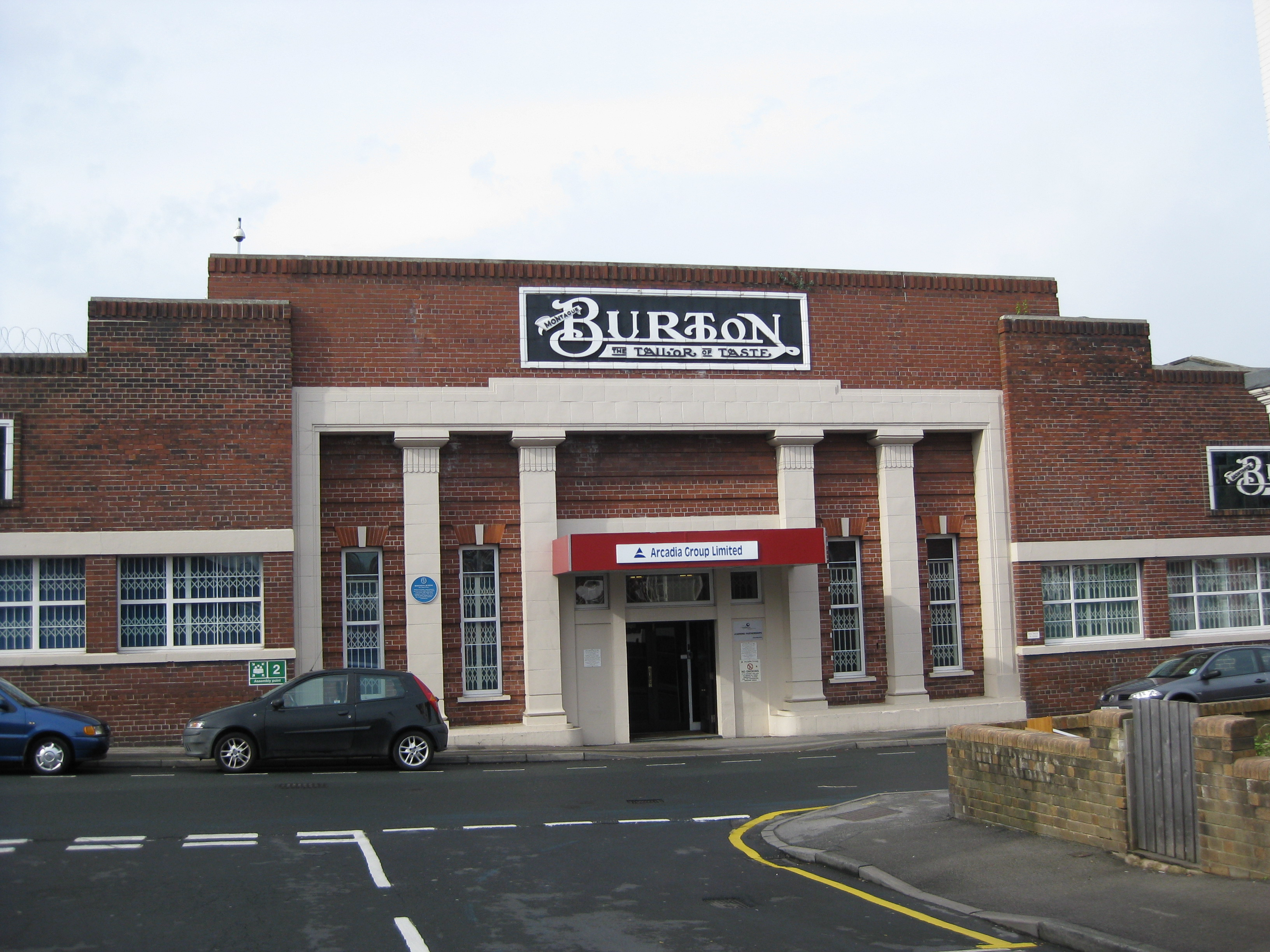
Burton's factory, Hudson Road, Leeds LS9

== Early life ==
Born Meshe David Osinsky and a Lithuanian Jew in Kurkliai, Kaunas province, he came alone to the United Kingdom in 1900 to escape the Russian pogroms. He was well-educated, having studied in a yeshiva, but arrived unable to speak English.

== Career ==
In 1901, he was staying in Cheetham Hill, Manchester. He started as a pedlar, then set up as a general outfitter in Chesterfield in 1903 selling readymade suits bought from a wholesaler.

Following his marriage to Sophie Marks in 1909 the name of the company was changed from M. Burton to Burton & Burton. On the birth of his twin boys in 1917, he gave his name as Montague Maurice Burton. However, he had not changed his name legally, which caused problems during the First World War.

By 1913 Burton had five men's tailor shops with headquarters in Sheffield and manufacturing in Leeds. He had four hundred shops, factories, and mills, by 1929, when the company went public. His firm made a quarter of the British military uniforms during World War II and a third of demobilisation clothing.

== Honours ==
Burton declined the offer to be Lord Mayor of Leeds in 1930 but was knighted in 1931 for "services to industrial relations" and was a Justice of the Peace from 1924. He became a Fellow of the Royal Society of Antiquaries in 1940 and was awarded an honorary doctorate (DLitt) by the University of Leeds in 1944.

== Personal life ==
In 1909, he married Sophia Amelia Marks: they had one daughter, Barbara (1910), and three sons, Stanley (1914) and twins Raymond and Arnold (1917).

== Death and legacy ==
He died while speaking after a dinner in Leeds on 21 September 1952. The funeral was at the Harrogate Synagogue (some sources say Chapeltown) and he was interred at Gildersome. However, he and his wife were reinterred in 1964 at Stonefall Jewish cemetery, Harrogate, the first to be buried there.

Burton endowed chairs in industrial relations in the University of Leeds and Cardiff in 1929 and Cambridge in 1930. He also endowed chairs of international relations in Jerusalem (1929), and at Oxford University (1930), the London School of Economics and Political Science (LSE) (1936) and The University of Edinburgh (1948).

He is commemorated in the Montague Burton Residences, which are student flats at the University of Leeds.

He wrote the foreword to the seminal work on the business successes of the Quakers: Quakers in commerce: A record of business achievement (1940), by Paul H. Emden.

== Publication ==
- Burton, Montague (1943). The Middle Path – Talks on Collective Security, Arbitration and other aspects of International & Industrial Relations. Petty & Sons

== See also ==
- Burton (retailer)
- Montague Burton Professor of Industrial Relations
- Montague Burton Professor of International Relations
- Montague Burton Building, Dublin
