= The Full Monty =

1997 British black comedy film by Peter Cattaneo

- British theatrical release poster
- Directed by: Peter Cattaneo
- Written by: Simon Beaufoy
- Produced by: Uberto Pasolini
- Starring: Robert Carlyle; Tom Wilkinson; Mark Addy
- Cinematography: John de Borman
- Edited by: David Freeman; Nick Moore
- Music by: Anne Dudley
- Production companies: Redwave Films; Channel Four Films
- Distributed by: Fox Searchlight Pictures (through 20th Century Fox)
- Release dates: 13 August 1997 (United States); 29 August 1997 (United Kingdom)
- Running time: 91 minutes
- Country: United Kingdom
- Language: English
- Budget: $3.5 million
- Box office: $257.9 million

The Full Monty is a 1997 British comedy film directed by Peter Cattaneo, written by Simon Beaufoy, and starring Robert Carlyle, Tom Wilkinson and Mark Addy. The film is set in Sheffield in the North of England during the 1990s, and tells the story of six unemployed men, four of them former steel workers, who decide to form a male striptease act (à la Chippendale dancers) to make some money and for the main character, Gaz, to be able to see his son. Gaz declares that their show will be much better than the Chippendales because they will go "the full monty"—strip all the way.

Despite being a comedy, the film also touches on serious subjects such as unemployment, fathers' rights, depression, impotence, homosexuality, body image, working class culture and suicide. The Full Monty was a critical success upon release and an international commercial success, grossing $257 million from a budget of only $3.5 million. It was the highest-grossing film in the UK until it was outsold by Titanic. It won the BAFTA and European Film Award for Best Film, and the Academy Award for Best Original Score. It was also nominated for Academy Awards for Best Picture, Best Director and Best Original Screenplay.

The Full Monty was released in the United Kingdom by Fox Searchlight Pictures via 20th Century Fox on 29 August 1997. The British Film Institute ranked the film the 25th best British film of the 20th century. It was adapted into a musical in 2000 and a play in 2013. A follow-up TV series was released in 2023.

== Plot ==
In the mid-1990s, the once-successful steel mills of Sheffield, South Yorkshire, have shut down and most of the workers have been made redundant. Former steelworkers Gary "Gaz" Schofield and Dave Horsfall resort to stealing scrap metal from the abandoned mills and selling it to make money, taking Gaz's son Nathan with them for assistance, but a security guard keeps surprising them and locking them inside the mill.

Gaz is facing trouble from his former wife Mandy and her boyfriend Barry over child support payments that he cannot pay since losing his job. Nathan lives with Mandy and Barry but Gaz has joint custody of him with Mandy. Mandy is seeking a court ruling giving her sole custody of Nathan.

One day, Gaz spots a crowd of women lined up outside a club to see a Chippendales' striptease act, and is inspired to form his own striptease group using local men, hoping to make enough money to pay off his child support arrears. The first to join the group is Lomper, a security guard at the mill where Dave and Gaz once worked, whose suicide attempt they interrupt. Next, they recruit Gerald Cooper, their former foreman, who is hiding his unemployment from his wife. Gaz and Dave see Gerald and his wife, Linda, at a dance class, and recruit him to teach them some moves.

Looking for more recruits, the four men hold an open audition and settle on Horse, an older man who is a good dancer, and Guy, who cannot dance but proves to be unusually well-endowed. The six men begin to practise their act. Gaz then learns that he has to pay a £100 deposit to secure the club for the night. He cannot afford this but Nathan gets the money out of his savings, saying that he trusts Gaz to repay him. When they are greeted by two women while putting up posters for the show, Gaz boasts that they are better than the real Chippendales because they go "the full monty". Dave, struggling with his body image, drops out and finds a job as a security guard at Asda. The others publicly rehearse at the mill for some female relatives of Horse, but a passing policeman catches them mid-show and Gaz, Gerald and Horse are arrested for indecent exposure, costing Gaz the right to see Nathan. Lomper and Guy escape to Lomper's house and start a relationship.

Gerald is thrown out by Linda after bailiffs arrive at their house and seize their belongings to pay Gerald's debts, resulting in him having to stay with Gaz. Later Gaz goes to Asda and asks Dave if he could "borrow" a jacket for Lomper's mother's funeral. Dave agrees and also decides to quit his security job. They steal two suit jackets and go to the funeral.

Soon, the group find that the act and their arrest has popularised them. They agree to forgo the plan, until Gaz learns that the show is sold out. He convinces the others to do it just for one night only. Initially Dave still refuses but regains his confidence after encouragement from his wife, Jean, and joins the rest of the group minutes before they go on stage. Nathan also arrives with Dave, having secretly come along, and tells Gaz that Mandy is there but she would not let Barry go with her.

Gaz refuses to do the act because there are men in the audience (including the police officers who watched the footage of the security camera's recording of them earlier), when the posters were supposed to say it was for women only. The other five are starting the act when Nathan orders Gaz to go out on stage. Gaz, proud of his son, joins the others and performs in front of the audience and Mandy, who seems to see him in a new light. Their act is a success.

== Cast ==
- Robert Carlyle as Gary "Gaz" Schofield
- Mark Addy as Dave Horsfall
- Tom Wilkinson as Gerald Arthur Cooper
- Steve Huison as Lomper
- Paul Barber as Barrington "Horse" Mitchell
- Hugo Speer as Guy
- William Snape as Nathan Schofield
- Lesley Sharp as Jean Horsfall
- Emily Woof as Mandy
- Deirdre Costello as Linda Cooper
- Paul Butterworth as Barry
- Dave Hill as Alan
- Bruce Jones as Reg
- Andrew Livingston as Terry
- Vinny Dhillon as Sharon
- Kate Rutter as Dole Clerk

== Production ==
Channel 4 Films paid for the screenplay to be written but then declined to invest any equity in the film. Fox Searchlight ended up financing it for almost £3 million.

The famous "Hot Stuff" scene, in which the characters dance in the queue at the Jobcentre, was originally going to be cut from the final production as it was considered "too unrealistic".

The cast allegedly agreed that all six of them would really do the "full monty" strip at the end in front of 50 extras, provided they had to do only one take. Hugo Speer told The Guardian in 2019: "The climactic scene was nuts. It was in a very cold working men's club, starting at about midday. The makeup and costume girls knew how we were feeling, so they were thrusting glasses of alcohol into our hands between takes. The extras had smuggled in booze, too. They weren't aware we were going to go all the way – that was a bit of smarts on the producers' part, so it was a completely natural reaction they got at the end."

The production and shooting was also said to be very challenging, with Robert Carlyle saying: "The Full Monty was a tough shoot, it really really was. Horrible."

=== Locations ===
The film was shot entirely on location in and around Sheffield in April 1996, except for a couple of locations in Shirebrook, Derbyshire.

Shiregreen Working Men's Club featured in the film as the fictitious Millthorpe Working Men's Club, where the climactic final scenes of the film take place. Shiregreen WMC subsequently branded itself as "the home of The Full Monty"; however, it closed down in November 2019. The building was subsequently destroyed by fire on 9 August 2026, after it had been left to become derelict.

=== The Reel Monty ===
The opening sequence of the Sheffield promotion film from 1972 is taken from City on the Move, a film commissioned by Peter Wigley, Sheffield's first ever publicity officer, to convince people that Sheffield was a centre for tourism and commerce. City on the Move was produced and directed by Jim and Marie-Luise Coulthard and showed a modern thriving city that was rapidly developing thanks to the successful steel industry in Sheffield. However, the film went virtually unnoticed until the Coulthards were approached about some of the footage being included in The Full Monty for a payment of £400, which they accepted. In 2008, City on the Move was released on DVD under the new name The Reel Monty.

=== Language ===
The film features frequent use of British slang, and in particular Sheffielder dialect.

The film's title is a phrase generally used in the United Kingdom to mean "the whole lot", or "the whole hog"; in the film, the characters use it to refer to full nudity — as Horse says, "No one said anything to me about the full monty!" The phrase, whose origin is obscure (a possible meaning relates to a full 3-piece suit by the then popular high street tailor Montague Burton), gained a renewed prominence in British culture following the film.

Other dialect words are used in the film; some such as nesh (meaning a person unusually susceptible to cold) are widespread across the North Midlands region. Jennel (an alley) is local to Sheffield: it is a variation on the word "ginnel", which is in full versions of the Oxford English Dictionary and is used in many parts of England.

== Release ==
=== Critical reception ===
The film surprised critics when it was first released, earning near-universal acclaim, and it went on to be nominated for the Academy Award for Best Picture.

Writing in Time Out New York regarding the implications of the film Andrew Johnston stated: "Monty is much less ribald than it sounds. The funniest moments are frequently the most subtle, like when five of the strippers, standing in the dole line, find themselves unable to resist dancing in place when Donna Summers's "Hot Stuff" comes on the radio. There's surprisingly little raunch, in part because the film can't stop thinking of women as enemies of a sort (at least Monty is less offensive than Brassed Off in that department). And refreshingly, its definition of male bonding is broad enough to let two of the lads find love in each other's arms."

Review aggregate Rotten Tomatoes retrospectively reports that 96% of critics have given the film a positive review based on 55 reviews, with an average score of 7.50/10. The consensus reads, "Cheeky and infectiously good-natured, The Full Monty bares its big beating heart with a sly dose of ribald comedy." On Metacritic, which assesses films with a score out of 100, the film has a score of 75 based on 31 critics' reviews, indicating "generally favorable reviews".

=== Box office ===
The Full Monty opened on six screens in the United States on 13 August 1997 and grossed $244,375 in its first five days, with a per-screen average in its opening weekend of $29,430; the highest for a film that weekend. The film expanded to 10 screens the following weekend and then 36 screens for the Labor Day weekend (29 August – 1 September) where it remained the film with the highest per-screen average gross ($25,344) and grossed a total of $1.7 million in its first 20 days. When the film was released in the United Kingdom on 29 August 1997 on 224 screens, it grossed £1,593,928 in its first 3 days, ranking second at the UK box office behind Men in Black, which grossed £1.7 million in its fifth week of release from almost twice the number of screens (411). However, it beat Men in Black for the week and took the weekend crown the following weekend and remained number one at the UK box office for the next nine weeks, the longest a film had remained at number one in the UK. It became the highest-grossing British film of all time in its ninth week of release, surpassing Four Weddings and a Funeral. It was displaced as the weekend number one by Face/Off but remained the highest grosser for the week and returned to spend the next two weekends back at number one. It was the highest-grossing film in the UK for thirteen consecutive weeks and eleven weekends. In the US, it expanded to 387 screens on 12 September and grossed $2.9 million for the weekend to finish in fifth place at the box office. It expanded further to 650 screens the following weekend where it retained its fifth place.

It also opened at number one in Australia where it remained for five weeks. In France, it opened at the same time as The Lost World: Jurassic Park and recorded a per screen average of $16,699 compared to the former's $19,133, finishing in third place for the week. On 27 January 1998, it surpassed Jurassic Park to become the highest-grossing film in the UK and finished with a gross of £52.2 million ($85 million). In the United States and Canada it finished its run with a gross of $46 million. It grossed $127 million in other international markets for a worldwide gross of $258 million.

=== Accolades and recognition ===
The Full Monty won the BAFTA Award for Best Film in 1997, beating presumed frontrunners Titanic and L.A. Confidential and Carlyle won the BAFTA Award for Best Actor in a Leading Role. It was nominated for a total of four Academy Awards: Best Picture, Best Director, Best Original Score and Best Original Screenplay.

In 1997, the Best Picture and Best Director Oscars went to that year's big winner, Titanic and its director James Cameron, and the Best Original Screenplay Oscar went to Ben Affleck and Matt Damon for Good Will Hunting. At this time the Academy Award for Best Original Score was split up into two categories: Dramatic and Musical or Comedy. The Dramatic score award went to Titanic and Anne Dudley won the Oscar for Best Original Musical or Comedy Score for The Full Monty. The film was also nominated for the prestigious Grand Prix of the Belgian Syndicate of Cinema Critics.

In 1999, it was ranked #25 on the BFI Top 100 British films list. In 2000, readers of Total Film magazine voted The Full Monty the 49th greatest comedy film of all time. By that year it earned an estimated £194 million at the box office worldwide.

=== Controversy ===
New Zealand playwrights Anthony McCarten and Stephen Sinclair filed a £180 million lawsuit against the producers of The Full Monty in 1998. They claim that the film blatantly infringed on their play, Ladies Night, which toured both Britain and New Zealand. Anthony McCarten and Stephen Sinclair created a website containing their play in response to statements from the producers of The Full Monty that claimed the two productions were not alike. The underlying rights were attributed to co-producer Paul Bucknor, and the lawsuit was settled out of court; as part of the agreement, the website containing Ladies Night was shut down.

== Soundtrack ==
Anne Dudley's Oscar for Best Score was a surprise, and some critics felt undeserved, inasmuch as the award is for original music and most of the film's memorable moments had jukebox favourites playing. Dudley composed "about 20 minutes' worth of music" for the film. Bob Strauss called the Oscar "well-deserved", while Pauline Reay felt Dudley's underscore complemented the familiar hits. Dudley described her score to Steven Poole:

It was this conglomeration of sounds—baritone sax, acoustic guitar, harmonica [...] The reasoning was that all these six men are different, they come from different backgrounds, but in the final scene it all works. The idea was that the instruments should do that as well—they all come from different places but they actually gel...

The Full Monty: Music from the Motion Picture Soundtrack

Soundtrack album by Various Artists
- Released: 1997
- Length: 59:12
- Label: RCA

The album The Full Monty: Music from the Motion Picture Soundtrack includes two original tracks by Dudley plus the pop hits, including a cover by Tom Jones of "You Can Leave Your Hat On" commissioned and produced by Dudley, who had collaborated with Jones on a 1988 cover of "Kiss".

Professional ratings
Review scores
Source	Rating
AllMusic	link

1. "The Zodiac" – David Lindup (3:06)
2. "You Sexy Thing" – Hot Chocolate (4:03)
3. "You Can Leave Your Hat On" – Tom Jones (4:26)
4. "Moving on Up" – M People (5:29)
5. "Make Me Smile (Come Up and See Me)" – Steve Harley & Cockney Rebel (3:59)
6. "The Full Monty" – Anne Dudley (3:04)
7. "The Lunchbox Has Landed" – Anne Dudley (2:14)
8. "Land of a Thousand Dances" – Wilson Pickett (2:24)
9. "Rock & Roll, Pt. 2" – Gary Glitter (3:02)
10. "Hot Stuff" – Donna Summer (3:49)
11. "We Are Family" – Sister Sledge (3:35)
12. "Flashdance... What a Feeling" – Irene Cara (3:49)
13. "The Stripper" – Joe Loss & His Orchestra (2:11)

=== Certifications ===
Region	Certification	Certified units/sales
Australia (ARIA)	2× Platinum	140,000^{^}
Canada (Music Canada)	Platinum	100,000^{^}
United Kingdom (BPI)	3× Platinum	900,000^{^}
United States (RIAA)	Gold	500,000^{^}
^{^} Shipments figures based on certification alone.

== Adaptations ==
In 1998, the film was novelized by the British writer Wendy Holden.

The film was adapted into a 2000 Broadway musical of the same name; the characters and setting were Americanized. The musical ran in the West End at the Prince of Wales Theatre in 2002.

It was also adapted into a stage play by the original screenwriter Simon Beaufoy, which opened at the Lyceum Theatre, Sheffield on 2 February 2013, directed by Sheffield Theatres artistic director Daniel Evans, before embarking on a national tour. It opened in the West End at the Noël Coward Theatre on 25 February 2014.

However, despite positive reviews, the show closed on 29 March, rather than the planned 14 June, after a run of just over a month. A Portuguese-language version was adapted for theatrical performance in Brazil by Brazilian journalist Artur Xexéo. This version of the play was directed by Tadeu Aguiar, and debuted in Brazil on 6 October 2015.

In 2017, twenty years after the film's release, an ITV Special titled The Real Full Monty was announced in order to raise awareness of prostate cancer and testicular cancer. It aired on 15 June 2017 and starred Alexander Armstrong, Ashley Banjo, Danny John-Jules, Dominic Littlewood, Elliott Wright, Harry Judd, Mark Foster, Matthew Wolfenden and Wayne Sleep. The show has returned each year since: The Real Full Monty and The Real Full Monty: Ladies' Night (2018), The All New Monty: Who Bares Wins (2019), The Real Full Monty on Ice (2020), Strictly The Real Full Monty (2021). Banjo has starred in every episode. A version of The Real Full Monty has been produced for Australian audiences, with the participants being Australian celebrities.

=== Television series ===
In 2023, FX on Hulu and Disney+ released a limited television series based on the film. The series is produced by Searchlight Television, FXP and Little Island Productions. Simon Beaufoy is credited as creator, writer and executive producer. The original cast members, including Carlyle, Wilkinson, and Addy, reprised their roles. On 2 July 2022, Speer was removed from the series due to inappropriate conduct claims. The series premiered on 14 June 2023.

== See also ==
- BFI Top 100 British films
- Brassed Off (1996)
- Billy Elliot (2000)
- Pride (2014)
