= Demobilisation of the British Armed Forces after World War II =

Demobilisation of British Armed Forces after Second World War

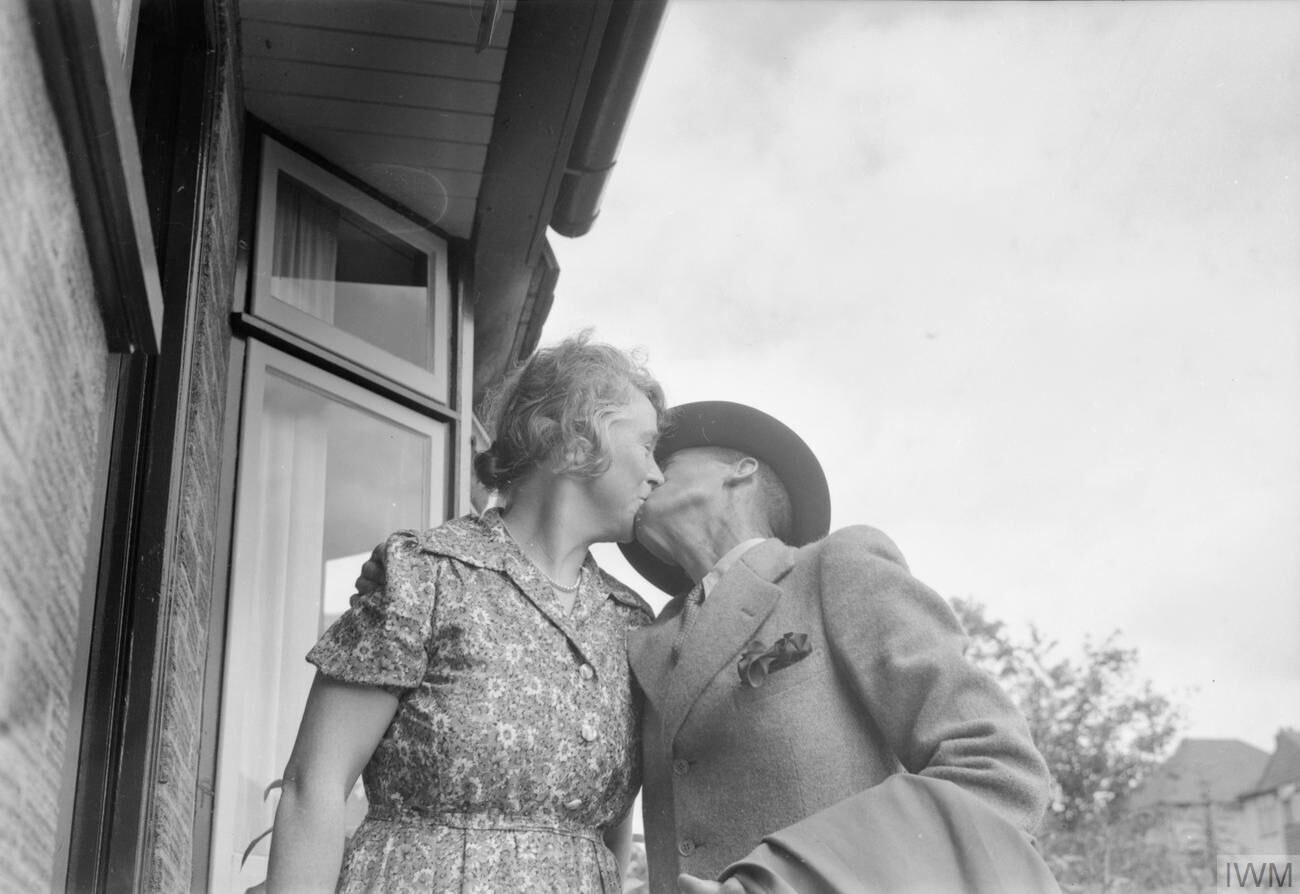
Mr C Stilwell returns to his home in Farnham, Surrey, after being demobbed and is greeted by his wife.

At the end of the Second World War, there were approximately five million servicemembers in the British Armed Forces. The demobilisation and reassimilation of this vast force back into civilian life was one of the first and greatest challenges facing the postwar British government.

== Demobilisation plan ==
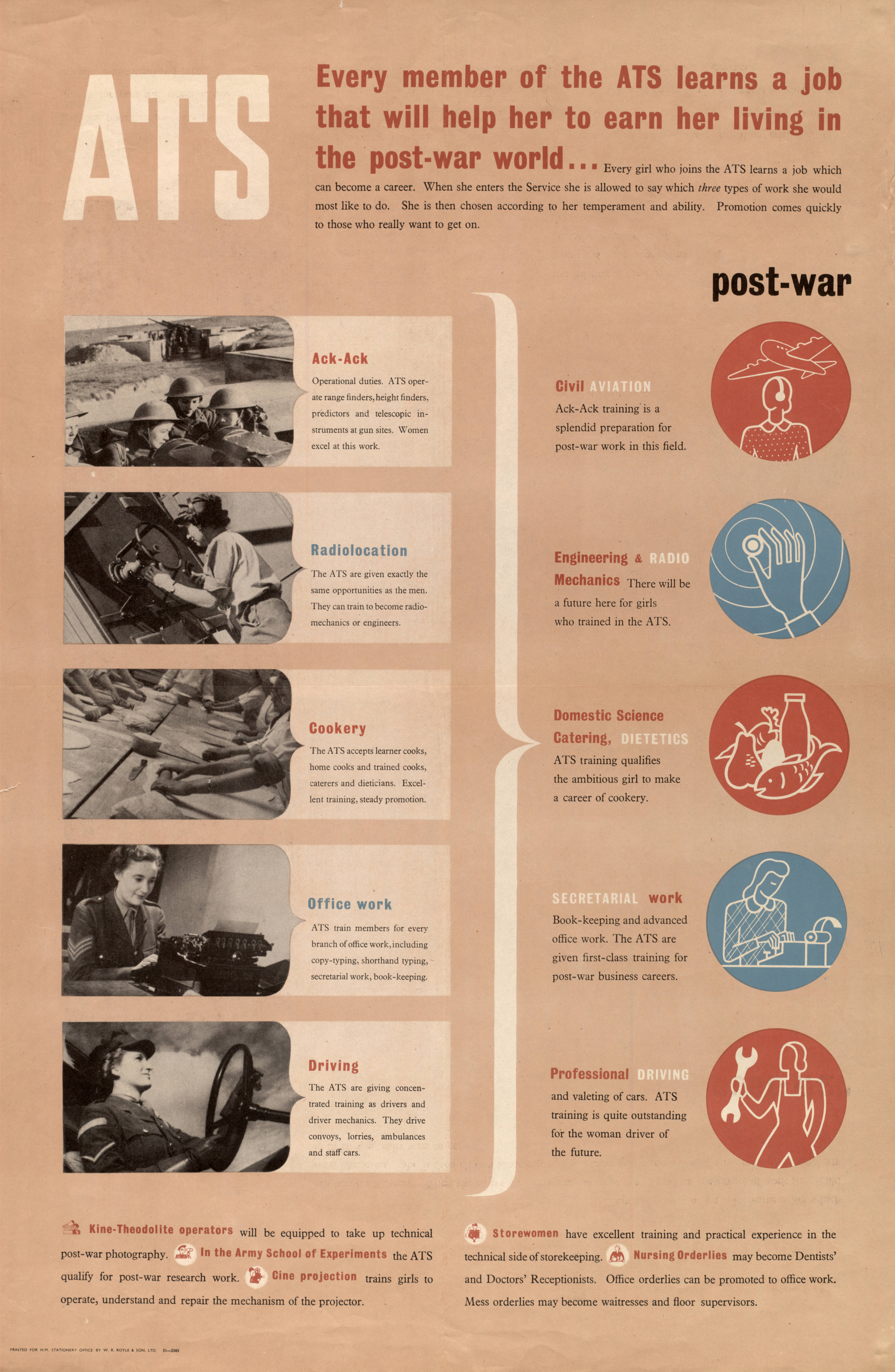
A poster from the Auxiliary Territorial Service, emphasizing future peacetime careers for which ATS service would prepare its members

The wartime Minister of Labour and National Service and Britain's first post-war Foreign Secretary Ernest Bevin, was the chief architect of the demobilisation plan. The speed of its introduction was attributed to the tide of public opinion, which favoured slogans and policies that appealed to peace and disengagement. According to some sources, it was also driven by the labour shortage due to post-war reconstruction. The plan received bipartisan support, which was not seen during the 1930s when Labour and Conservative positions lacked consensus.

The details involving the criteria and framework for demobilisation were unveiled to the public on 22 September 1944. It was scheduled to be implemented on 18 June 1945 and, a month before that date, British soldiers were already well informed about the process, including the welfare system that would support the veterans. Under the plan, most servicemen and servicewomen were to be released from the armed forces according to their 'age-and-service number', which, as its name suggests, was calculated from their age and the months they had served in uniform. A small number of so-called 'key men' whose occupational skills were vital to postwar reconstruction were to be released ahead of their turn. Married women and men aged fifty or more were also given immediate priority.

Service personnel being demobilised passed through special demobilisation centres.

== Release process ==
The release process began on schedule, about six weeks after V-E Day. Decommissioned soldiers received a one-time grant of £83 each, the promise of a right to return to their old jobs, and a set of civilian clothing, which included the so-called "demob suit", shirts, underclothes, raincoats, hat, and shoes. At the end of 1945, demobilised soldiers reached 750,000 and this number doubled two months later after Japan's surrender. By 1947, about 4.3 million men and women returned to 'civvy street'. The process was not without controversy. Frustration at the allegedly slow pace of release led to a number of disciplinary incidents in all branches of the armed services in the winter of 1945–6, most famously the so-called RAF 'strikes' in India and South East Asia. This frustration led to the abandonment of some of the pre-release programmes.

== Personal challenges ==
Aside from the institutional problems of release, returning service-men and -women faced all kinds of personal challenges on their return to civilian life. Britain had undergone six years of bombardment and blockade, and there was a shortage of many of the basic essentials of living, including food, clothing, and housing. Husbands and wives also had to adjust to living together again after many years apart. One indicator of the social problems this caused was the postwar divorce rate; over 60,000 applications were processed in 1947 alone, a figure that would not be reached again until the 1960s.

== Demobilisation centres ==
At the end of World War II, British servicemen and women returned to civilian life by passing through a demobilisation centre. Personnel returning to this country from abroad for the purpose of release passed first through a disembarkation unit. They then went on to a dispersal unit.

=== Military Disembarkation Camp Units ===
Command or District	Title of Unit	Location
Southern	No. 1 Military Disembarkation Camp Unit	Ranikhet Camp Reading
Southern	No. 2 Military Disembarkation Camp, Unit	Slade Camp, Oxford
Eastern	No. 3 Military Disembarkation Camp Unit	Moore Barracks, Shorncliffe, Kent
Western	No. 1 Military Disembarkation Camp, Group H.Q.	Hadrian's Camp Carlisle
Western	No. 4 Military Disembarkation Camp Unit	Hadrian's Camp Carlisle
Western	No. 5 Military Disembarkation Camp Unit	Hadrian's Camp Carlisle
Northern	No. 6 Military Disembarkation Camp Unit	Queen Elizabeth Barracks, Strensall, York.

=== Military Dispersal Units ===
Command or District	Title of Unit	Location
Scottish	No.1 Military Dispersal Unit	Redford Barracks, Edinburgh
Northern	No. 2 Military Dispersal Unit	Fulford Barracks, York
Eastern	No. 3 Military Dispersal Unit	Talavera Camp, Northampton
Eastern	No. 5 Military Dispersal Unit	Queen's Camp, Guildford
London	No. 4 Military Dispersal Unit	Regent's Park Barracks, Albany St., N.W.I.
Southern	No. 6 Military Dispersal Unit	Sherford Camp, Taunton
Western	No. 7 Military Dispersal Unit	North and South Camps, Ashton-under-Lyne
Western	No. 8 Military Dispersal Unit	Bradbury Lines, Hereford
Northern Ireland	No. 9 Combined Military Collecting and Dispersal Unit	Victoria Barracks, Belfast

== See also ==
- Civil Resettlement Units
- Demobilization
- Demobilisation of the Australian military after World War II
- Demobilization of United States armed forces after World War II
- Demob suit
- Military discharge
- Military history of the United Kingdom during World War II
- National Service (Armed Forces) Act 1939
- Royal Air Force Mutiny of 1946
- Post–World War II demobilization strikes

== References and sources ==
Sources

- Alan Allport, Demobbed: Coming Home After the Second World War, Yale University Press, 2009, ISBN 0-300-14043-6
- Hansard - HL Deb 17 October 1945 vol 137 cc353-5
