= The whole nine yards =

Colloquial American English phrase

"The whole nine yards" or "the full nine yards" is a colloquial American English phrase meaning "everything, the whole lot" or, when used as an adjective, "all the way". Its first usage was the punch line of an 1855 Indiana comedic short story titled "The Judge's Big Shirt".

The earliest known idiomatic use of the phrase is from 1907 in Southern Indiana. The phrase is related to the expression the whole six yards, used around the same time in Kentucky and South Carolina. Both phrases are variations on the whole ball of wax, first recorded in the 1880s. They are part of a family of expressions in which an odd-sounding item, such as enchilada, shooting match, shebang or hog, is substituted for ball of wax. The choice of the number nine may be related to the expression "To the nines" (to perfection). Use of the phrase became widespread in the 1980s and 1990s. Much of the interest in the phrase's etymology can be attributed to New York Times language columnist William Safire, who wrote extensively on this question.

== History of the phrase ==
=== Origin ===
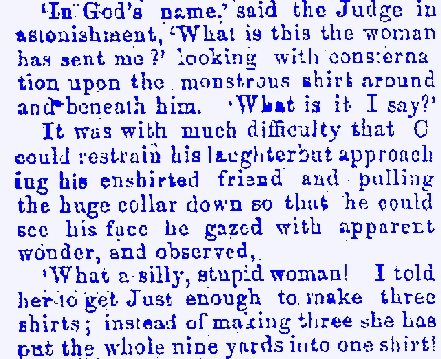
Snippet from 1855 short story "The Judge's Big Shirt," containing the first usage of the phrase

The Oxford English Dictionary places the earliest published non-idiomatic use of the phrase in the New Albany Daily Ledger (New Albany, Indiana, January 30, 1855) in a comedic short story titled "The Judge's Big Shirt."

The humorous anecdote follows Judge A., who regularly neglected packing a second shirt during his travels. He arrives in Raleigh, North Carolina, as part of a business trip. While hoping to find a shirt to borrow, he hints to his lawyer friend (Mr. C.) that he needs one in order to attend a prominent party the following evening. (The narrator clarifies that ready-made shirts were not purchasable "in those days", likely setting the story in the early 19th or late 18th century.) To teach Judge A. a lesson, Mr. C. specifically orders a comically large shirt and promises to have it delivered before the party. Minutes before their departure, the shirt arrives; Judge A. initially praises the craftsmanship, then struggles to pull it on, until he "[finds] himself enshrouded in a shirt five yards long and four yards broad". He is unable to see beyond the collar and expresses his astonishment at the "monstrous shirt".

At the punch line of the story, Mr. C pretends to be innocent of his prank and exclaims, "What a silly, stupid woman! I told her to get just enough to make three shirts; instead of making three, she has put the whole nine yards into one shirt!" Despite this, the Judge attends the party, stuffing the shirt into his undergarments. He is later forced to explain the story to his wife, after which the lawyer feels at liberty to share the story with friends.

=== Idiomatic usage ===
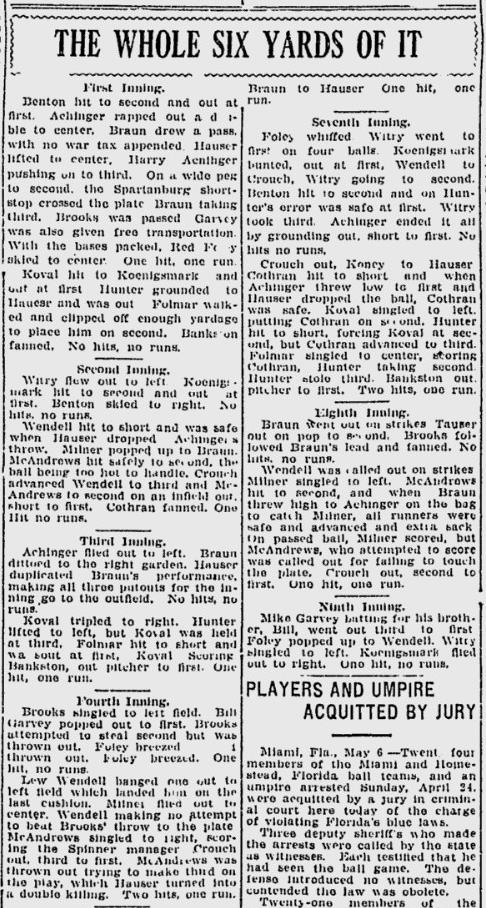
A 1921 headline from The Spartanburg Herald-Journal in South Carolina reads "The Whole Six Yards of It."

The first known use of the phrase as an idiom appears in The Mitchell Commercial, a newspaper in the small town of Mitchell, Indiana, in its May 2, 1907, edition:

This afternoon at 2:30 will be called one of the baseball games that will be worth going a long way to see. The regular nine is going to play the business men as many innings as they can stand, but we can not promise the full nine yards.

The idiom was used three more times in the Mitchell Commercial over the next seven years, in the forms give him the whole nine yards (i.e., tell someone a big story), take the whole nine yards (i.e., take everything), and settled the whole nine yards (i.e., resolved everything).

In other uses from this time period, the phrase was given as the whole six yards. In 1912, a local newspaper in Kentucky asked readers to, "Just wait boys until the fix gets to a fever heat and they will tell the whole six yards." The same newspaper repeated the phrase soon afterward in another issue, stating "As we have been gone for a few days and failed to get all the news for this issue we will give you the whole six yards in our next." The six-yard form of the phrase also appears in a 1917 Arkansas paper ("...he may write me personally and I'll give him the whole six yards."); a South Carolina newspaper headline;, in a Lawrenceville, Georgia newspaper in 1922, and in the text of a 1927 Missouri paper ("we heard the whole six yards--where did you lose your letter?").

Post-war usages of "the whole/full nine yards" have been found between 1946 and 1951 in a Lexington, Kentucky newspaper and in a 1956 issue of Kentucky Happy Hunting Ground, where it appears in an article on fishing. After describing the contests and prizes, the author writes, "So that's the whole nine-yards." It appeared in an article on hunting the following year, this time unhyphenated.

In a short story published in 1962, the phrase is attributed to "a brush salesman". A letter published in an auto magazine later that year describes a certain new car as containing "all nine yards of goodies". In 1964, several newspapers published a syndicated story which explained that "Give 'em the whole nine yards" was NASA talk for an item-by-item report. This early usage can be read as suggesting length, but can also be read as suggesting detailed completeness.

Two 1965 newspaper articles quote U.S. military personnel serving in Vietnam using the phrase. The phrase was explained as something "teenagers say" in a military-oriented magazine in 1965. Citations from 1966 show the phrase was used by a former U.S. Army airman, and also in a publication for military test pilots. It is also recorded in two contemporary novels concerning the U.S. Air Force in Vietnam, Carl Krueger's Wings of a Tiger (1966), and Elaine Shepard's The Doom Pussy (1967).

== Research ==
William Safire, a language columnist at the New York Times, asked listeners for information regarding the origin of the phrase on Larry King's radio show in 1982. Safire ended up writing nine columns on this subject and is largely responsible for the interest in it. In 1986, the phrase was added to the Oxford English Dictionary with the earliest citation given as 1970. The Historical Dictionary of American Slang (1997) cited Shepard's novel, thus pushing the earliest known usage back to 1967.

Yale University librarian Fred R. Shapiro described it as "the most prominent etymological riddle of our time".

Several key discoveries in further antedating the phrase were made by Bonnie Taylor-Blake, a neuroscience researcher at the University of North Carolina at Chapel Hill and an amateur member of the American Dialect Society, an association of professional and amateur linguists whose mailing list often serves as a forum for word and phrase discoveries. In 2012, Taylor-Blake discovered the 1956 and 1957 uses in Kentucky Happy Hunting Ground, and later that year she and Fred R. Shapiro found the "whole six yards" examples from the 1912–1921 period, which received substantial publicity. In 2013, Taylor-Blake posted her discovery of the Mitchell Commercial uses from the 1907–1914 period.

== Origin ==
There is still no consensus on the origin, though many early published quotations are now available for study. A vast number of explanations for this phrase have been suggested; however many of these are no longer viable in light of what is now known about the phrase's history.

- Many of the popular candidates relate to the length of pieces of fabric, or various garments, including Indian saris, Scottish kilts, burial shrouds, or bolts of cloth. No single source verifies that any one of those suggestions was the actual origin. However, an article published in Comments on Etymology demonstrates that fabric was routinely sold in standard lengths of nine yards (and other multiples of three yards) during the 1800s and early 1900s. This may explain why so many different types of cloth or garments have been said to have been nine yards long. The phrase "...she has put the whole nine yards into one shirt" appears in 1855.
- One explanation is that World War II (1939–1945) aircraft machine gun belts were nine yards long. There are many versions of this explanation with variations regarding type of plane, nationality of gunner and geographic area. An alternative weapon is the ammunition belt for the British Vickers machine gun, invented and adopted by the British Army before World War I (1914–1918). The standard belt for this gun held 250 rounds of ammunition and was approximately twenty feet (6 2/3 yards) in length. However, the Vickers gun as fitted to aircraft during the First World War usually had ammunition containers capable of accommodating linked belts of 350-400 rounds, the average length of such a belt being about nine yards, and it was thought that this may be the origin of the phrase. This theory is no longer considered viable, since the phrase predates World War I.
- Another common explanation is that "nine yards" is a cubic measure and refers to the volume of a concrete mixer. This theory, too, is inconsistent with the phrase's history.
- Other proposed sources include the volume of graves; ritual disembowelment; shipyards; and American football. Little documentary evidence has surfaced to support any of these explanations.
- One proposed origin involves the world of full-rigged sailing ships, in which yard is used not as a measure of length or size, but as the name of each horizontal spar on which a sail is hung. All square-rigged sails unfurled, with 3 yards on each of 3 masts, could then be described as the whole nine yards, but again no actual documentation has been uncovered to support this explanation, and in any case not all ships had exactly three yards on each mast, even disregarding the fact that by no means all sailing vessels were three-masters.
- Bonnie Taylor-Blake, noting that several early examples are in the form "give" or "tell" the whole nine (or six) yards, has suggested that the idiom likely relied on "yards" as "lengthy or thorough presentation [of news, anecdotes, play-by-play, etc.]"
- Jesse Sheidlower, editor-at-large for the Oxford English Dictionary, and Fred R. Shapiro have argued that the phrase does not have a concrete meaning, pointing to the variance between six and nine yards and comparing it to the whole shebang.

== See also ==
- The full monty
