= Demobilization =

Decommissioning of military personnel

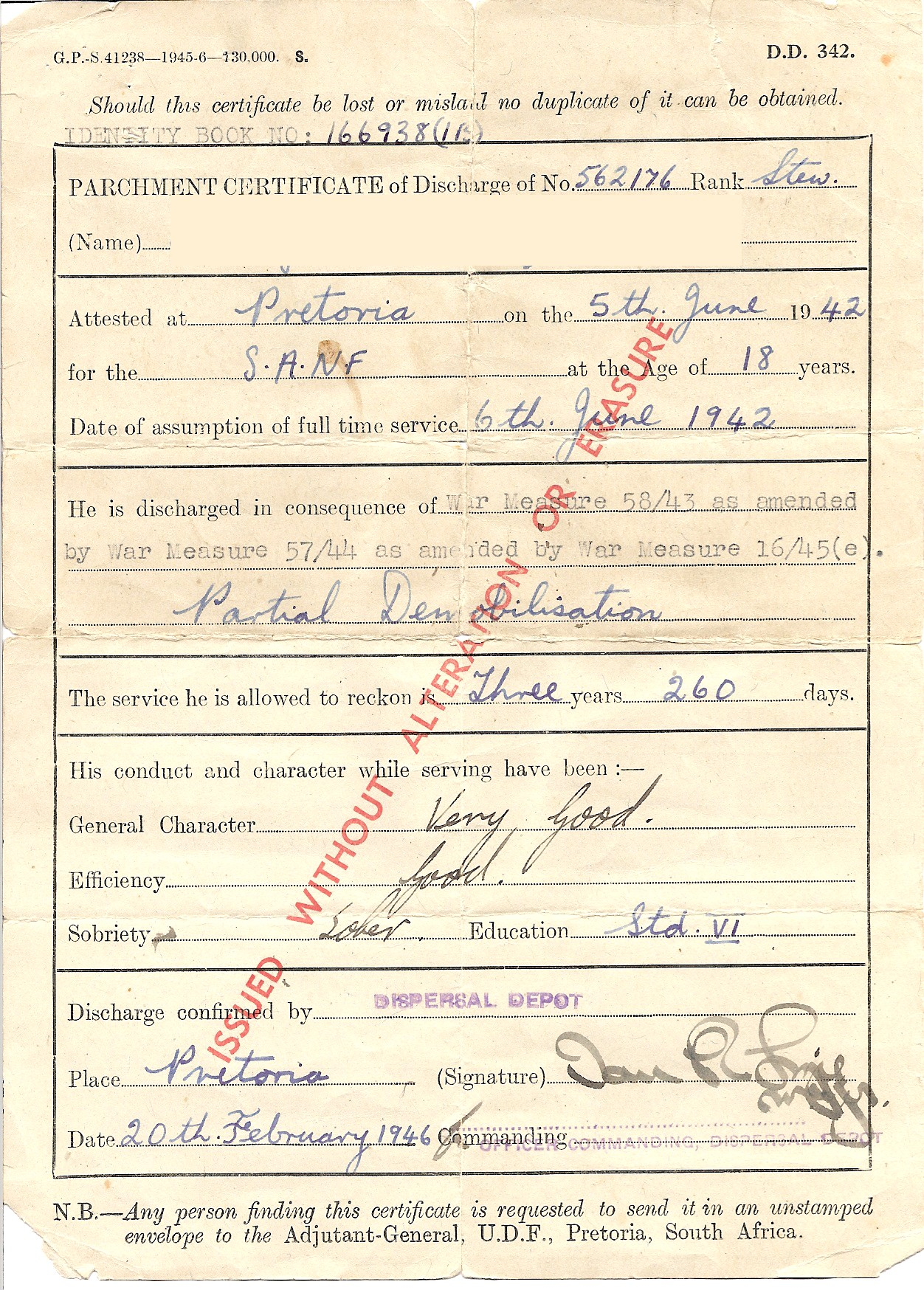
Demob papers issued to a South African sailor in February 1946

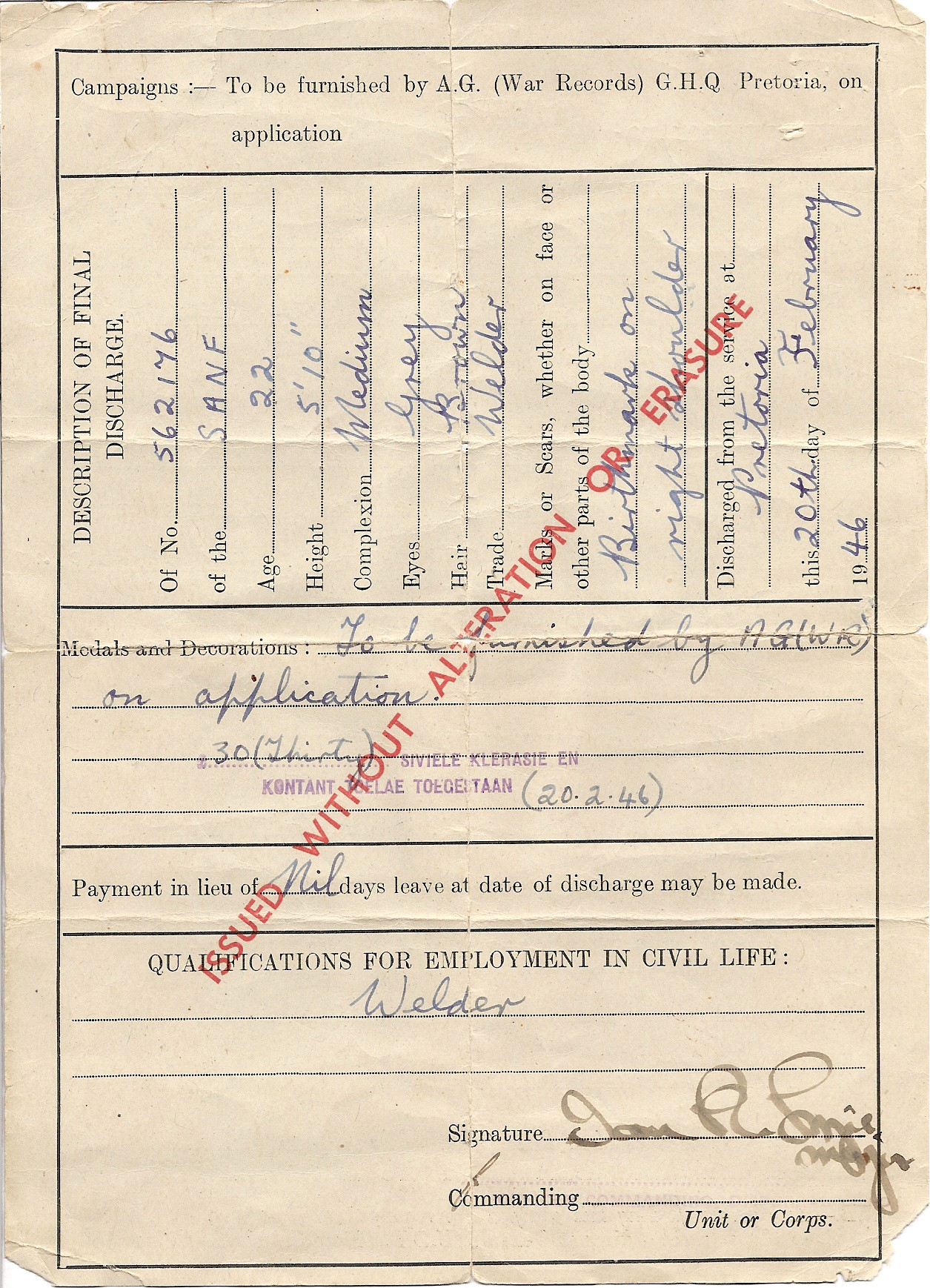
Back page of demob papers issued to a South African sailor in February 1946

Demobilization or demobilisation (see spelling differences) is the process of standing down members of a country's armed forces from combat-ready status. This may be as a result of victory in war, or because a crisis has been peacefully resolved and military force is no longer necessary. Peace-time militaries may demobilize batches of conscripts in a fairly predictable routine. Militaries can also demobilize their members to become reservists.

Demobilization is the opposite of mobilization, calling up forces for active military service. Forceful demobilization of a defeated enemy is called demilitarization.

== Definition ==
The United Nations defines demobilization as "a multifaceted process that officially certifies an individual's change of status from being a member of a military grouping of some kind to being a civilian". Persons undergoing demobilization are removed from the command and control of their armed force and group and the transformation from a military mindset to that of a civilian begins. Although combatants become civilians when they acquire their official discharge documents the mental connection and formal ties to their military command structure still exist. To prevent soldiers from rejoining their armed groups, important preparatory work must be done to ensure that combatants are ready to be reintegrated into society and capable of returning to their civilian lives. Civilians play an important role in supporting combatants to return to civilian life by exposing them to civilian lifestyles and mindsets that combat the rigid military mindset soldiers acquire during their time of service.

Demobilization can be partial or complete depending on the number of units removed from the command structure. The process is often a symbolic and significant part of the peace process during which the conflicting sides acknowledge their intent to consolidate peace.

The United Nations identifies demobilization as part of a three-pronged approach to conflict management. This includes disarmament, demobilization, and reintegration to take combatants out of conflict situations as well as remove weapons and help former members of armed groups rejoin society. For example, in 1917 the gradual demobilization of Canadian troops from England fostered the Khaki University to facilitate the re-integration of the soldiers into Canadian civilian life.

In the final days of World War II the United States Armed Forces developed a demobilization plan which would discharge soldiers on the basis of a point system that favored length and certain types of service. The British armed forces were demobilized according to an "age-and-service" scheme.

The phrase demob happy refers to demobilization and is broadly applied to the feeling of relief at imminent release from a time-serving burden, such as a career. In the Russian language, it is known as dembel and has become a certain tradition in the Soviet and post-Soviet Armed Forces. A United States equivalent is "short-timer's disease", comparable to "senioritis" among United States high school students.

== Two approaches to demobilization ==
The United Nations Peacekeeping Operational Manual lists two different approaches to demobilization. These approaches are the semi-permanent demobilization sites (cantonment) or the mobile method which means demobilization at the sites where ex-combatants are gathered.

== Other uses ==
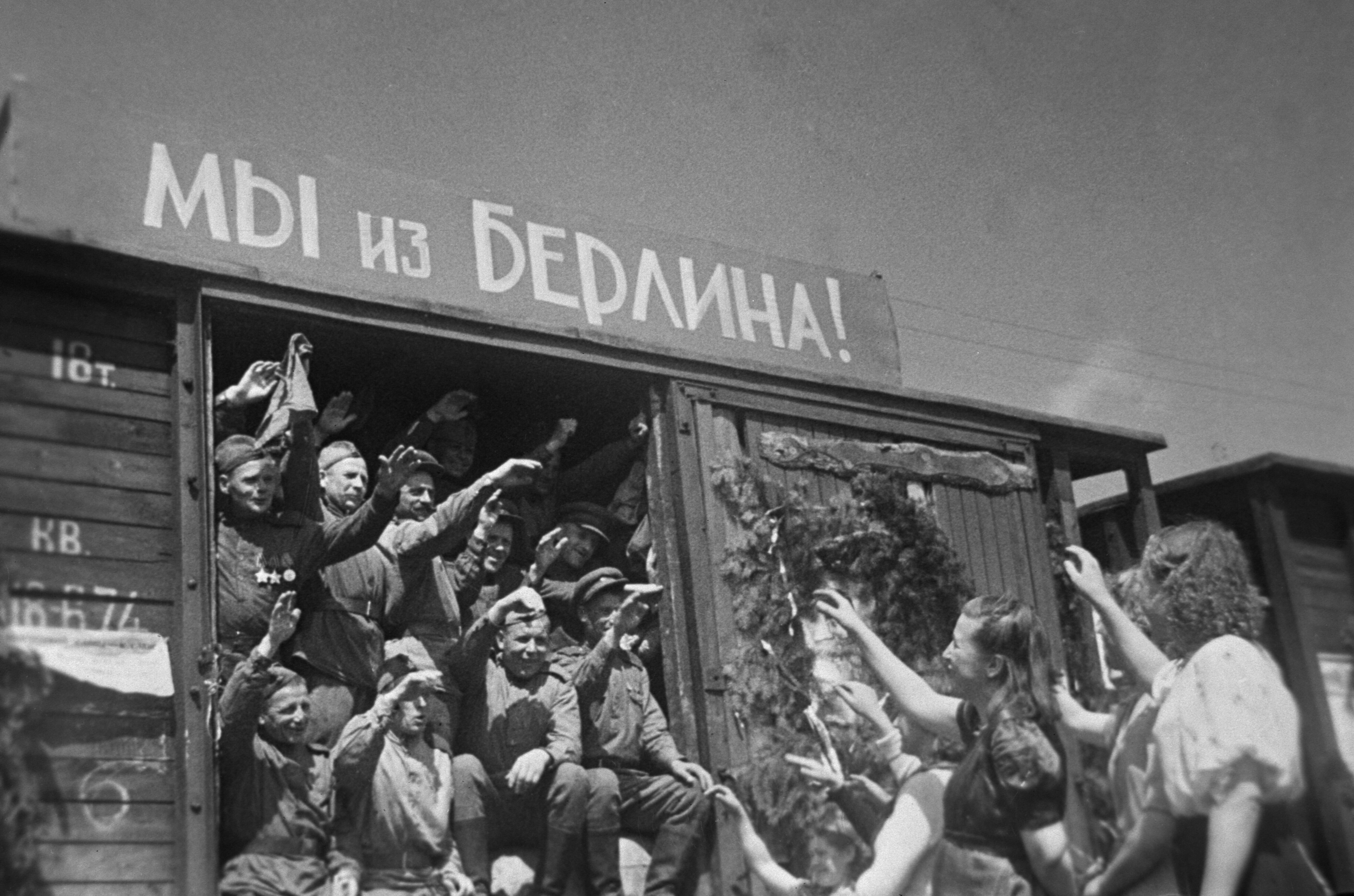
Residents greeting demobilized soldiers of the Red Army in Minsk, July 1945

In professional diving, demobilization is the dismantling, packing and transport back to storage of the diving spread, and where relevant, restoring the site to initial condition. Mobilization is the converse process.

== See also ==
- Demobilisation of the British Armed Forces after World War II
- Demobilization of United States armed forces after World War II
- Demob suit
- Disarmament, demobilization and reintegration
- Military discharge
