= The full monty =

British slang phrase

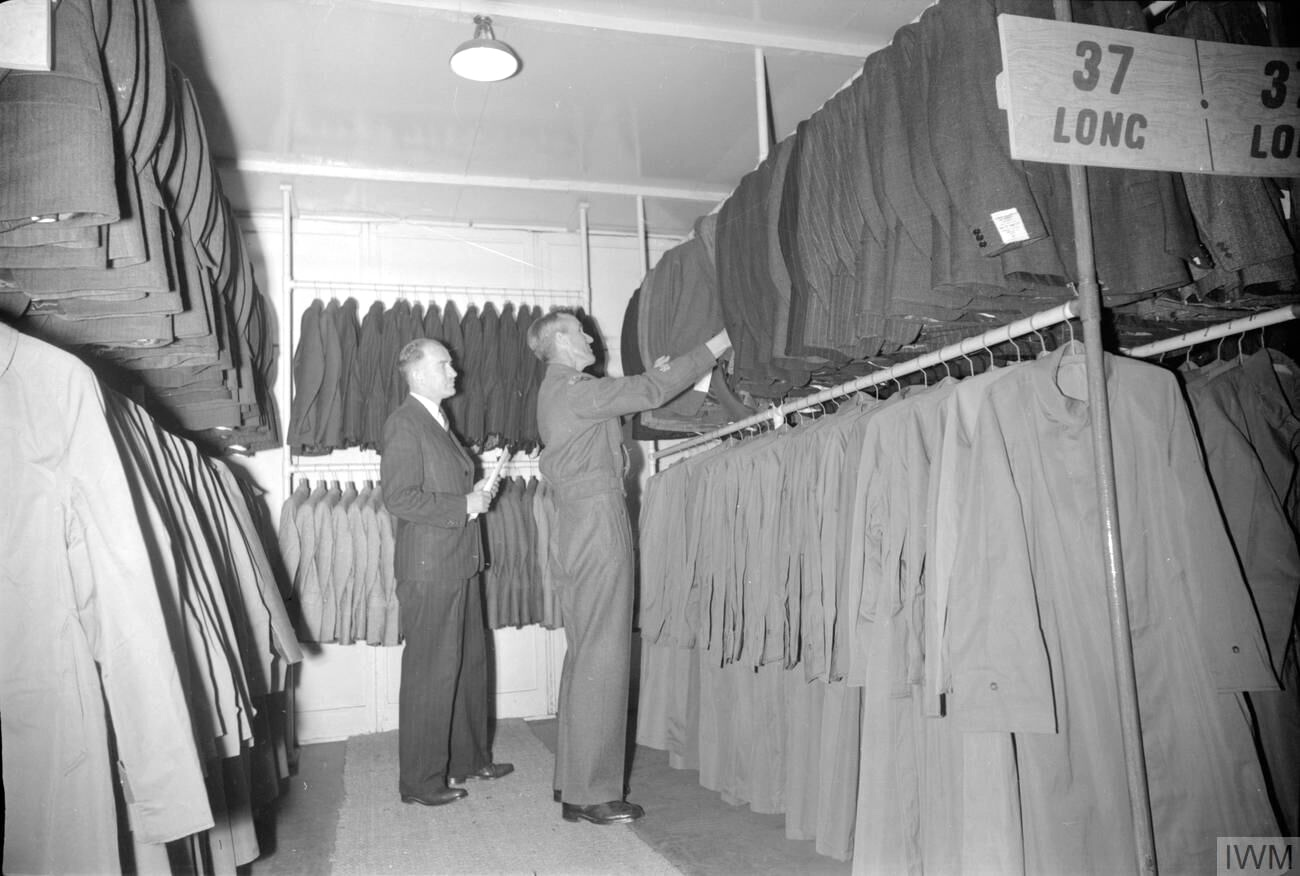
A British soldier of the Second World War selects a jacket for his "demob suit". These suits are one of the possible origins of the phrase.

"The Full Monty" cafe in Middleton, Greater Manchester in May 2008, not long before it closed

"The full monty" (or "the full Monty") is a British slang phrase of uncertain origin. It means "everything which is necessary, appropriate or possible; 'the works'". Similar North American phrases include "the whole kit and caboodle", "the whole nine yards", "the whole ball of wax", "the whole enchilada", "the whole shebang", or "[going] the whole hog".

The phrase was first identified in print by lexicographers of the Oxford English Dictionary in the 1980s. Anecdotal evidence exists for earlier usage; the phrase was also used as the name for some fish and chip shops in Manchester during the same period. The phrase was popularised more widely since the late 1990s via its use as the title of the 1997 British film The Full Monty, plus more recent spin-offs with the same title, wherein its usage (in the context of the story) denotes a complete reveal in the sense of stripping "all the way" on a stage, i.e., total nudity.

Hypothesised origins of the phrase include:

- Field Marshal Montgomery's preference for a large breakfast, even while on campaign.
- A full three-piece suit with waistcoat and a spare pair of trousers from the Leeds-based British tailoring company Montague Burton. When British forces were demobilised after the Second World War, they were issued with a "demob suit". The contract for supplying these suits was partly fulfilled by Montague Burton.
- Gamblers' jargon, meaning the entire kitty or pot, deriving from the card game called monte.
