= Agapito =

Agapito is both a given name and a surname. It is the Spanish and Italian version of Agapitus. Agapitus comes from Greek Ἀγαπητός (Agapetos), meaning "beloved", which derives from ἀγαπάω (agapaō, “to love”), related to ἀγάπη (agapē, “love”).

Notable people with the name include:

Given name

- Pope Agapetus I (490–536), Bishop of Rome, known as Agapetos in contemporary sources
- Agapito Aquino (1939–2015), Filipino politician
- Agapito Conchu, Filipino film director
- Agapito Gómez (born 1963), Spanish boxer
- Agapito Jiménez Zamora (1817–1879), Costa Rican politician
- Agapito Lozada (1938–2011), Filipino swimmer
- Agapito Mayor (1915–2005), Cuban baseball player
- Agapito Mba Mokuy (born 1965), Equatorial Guinean politician
- Agapito Sánchez (1970–2005), Dominican Republic boxer
- Agapito Flores, purported inventor of fluorescent light

Surname

- Julio García Agapito (died 2008), Peruvian environmentalist
- Lourdes Agapito, Spanish computer scientist
- Oliver Agapito (born 1973), Filipino basketball player

Nickname

- Alejandro Garcia Padilla (born 1971), Puerto Rican politician (nickname given to him by the Puerto Rican media)

== Other ==
- Agapito (film), a 2025 Philippine short drama film
