= List of common false etymologies of English words =

This is a list of common contemporary false etymologies for English words.

== Profanity ==
- Crap: The word "crap" did not originate as a back-formation of British plumber Thomas Crapper's surname, nor does his name originate from the word "crap", although the surname may have helped popularize the word. The surname "Crapper" is a variant of "Cropper", which originally referred to someone who harvested crops. The word "crap" ultimately comes from Medieval Latin crappa, meaning "chaff".
- Fuck: The word "fuck" did not originate as an acronym for "For Unlawful Carnal Knowledge", either as a sign posted above adulterers in the stocks, or as a criminal charge against members of the British Armed Forces; nor did it originate during the 15th-century Battle of Agincourt as a corruption of "pluck yew" (an idiom falsely attributed to the English for drawing a longbow). The word also did not originate in Christianized Anglo-Saxon England as an acronym for "Fornication Under Consent of King"; Modern English was not spoken until the 16th century, and the words "fornication" and "consent" are derived from Anglo-Norman and hence did not exist in Old English. The earliest recorded use of "fuck" in English comes from c. 1475, in the poem Flen flyys, where it is spelled fuccant (conjugated as if a Latin verb meaning "they fuck"). The word is ultimately derived from the Proto-Germanic word fukkōną via either Old English or Norse, and has cognates in many other Germanic languages.
- Shit: The word "shit" did not originate as an acronym for "Ship High in Transit", a label falsely said to have been used on shipments of manure to prevent them from becoming waterlogged and releasing explosive methane gas. The word comes from Old English scitte, and is of Proto-Germanic origin.

== Ethnic slurs ==
- Cracker: In the United States, the use of "cracker" as a pejorative term for a white person does not come from the use of bullwhips by whites against slaves in the Atlantic slave trade. The term comes from an old sense of "boaster" or "braggart"; alternatively, it may come from "corn-cracker".
- Gringo: The word "gringo" (a pejorative term for a white American) did not originate during the Mexican–American War (1846–1848), the Venezuelan War of Independence (1811–1823), the Mexican Revolution (1910–1920), or in the American Old West (c. 1865–1899) as a corruption of the lyrics "green grow" in either "Green Grow the Lilacs" or "Green Grow the Rushes, O" sung by American soldiers or cowboys; nor did it originate during any of these times as a corruption of "Green go home!", falsely said to have been shouted at green-clad American troops, or of "green coats" as a description of their uniforms. The word originally simply meant "foreigner" and is probably a corruption of Spanish griego, "Greek".
- Redneck: A "sometimes disparaging" term for a "white member of the Southern rural laboring class." Several sources have reported an incorrect origin story for the term as used in this sense: that it was first used to describe striking miners who tied red bandanas around their necks during the Battle of Blair Mountain in 1921. However, The Oxford English Dictionary attests to uses in the relevant sense at least as early as 1830.
- Spic: The word "spic" (a pejorative term for a Latino) did not originate as an abbreviation of "Hispanic"; nor as an acronym for "Spanish, Indian, and Colored" (in reference to minority races in the United States); nor as an acronym for "Spanish, Polish, Italian, and Chinese", falsely said to have been used by U.S. immigration officials in the 1940s, 1950s, or 1960s to categorize citizenship applications. The American Heritage Dictionary claims that the word is derived from "spiggoty", possibly from the Spanglish phrase "No speak the English".
- Wog: The cacophemism "wog", for a foreigner or person of colour, is sometimes believed to be an acronym for "wily Oriental gentleman". It is more likely to be a shortening of "golliwog".
- Wop: The word "wop" (a pejorative term for an Italian) is not an acronym for "without passport" or "working off passage". It is a corruption of dialectal Italian guappo, "thug".

== Acronyms ==
The use of acronyms to create new words was nearly non-existent in English until the middle of the 20th century. Nearly all older words were formed in other ways.

- [Military] Brat: Not an acronym for "British Regiment Attached Traveller". This is just a specific instance of the word brat, meaning child or offspring, first attested in 16th-century Scotland.
- "Chav": see under "Other"
- Coma: Not an acronym for "cessation of motor activity"; it comes from the Greek κῶμα kōma 'deep sleep'.
- Fuck: see under "Profanity"
- Golf: did not originate as an acronym of "gentlemen only, ladies forbidden". Its origin is unknown, but it existed in the Middle Scots period.
- News: The word news has been claimed to be an acronym of the four cardinal directions (north, east, west, and south). However, old spellings of the word varied widely (e.g., newesse, newis, nevis, neus, newys, niewes, newis, nues, etc.). Additionally, an identical term exists in French, "les nouvelles", which translates as the plural of "the new". "News" also does not stand for "notable events, weather, and sports". The word "news" is simply a plural form of new, and is attested in this sense from the early 15th century.
- Pom or pommy is an Australian English, New Zealand English, and South African English term for a person of British descent or origin. The exact origins of the term remain obscure (see here for further information). A legend persists that the term arises from the acronym P.O.M.E., for "prisoner of Mother England" (or P.O.H.M, "prisoners of His/Her Majesty"), although there is no evidence to support this assertion.
- Posh was not an acronym for wealthy British passengers getting "port out, starboard home" cabins on ocean liners to India, in order to get ocean breeze. It probably derives from 19th-century slang for a dandy and was originally an underworld slang term for money.
- Rap was not an acronym for "random acts of poetry" or "rhythm and poetry" used as speech-lyrics in contemporary music. The word means "to utter forcefully" and appeared as early as 1541.
- Shit: see under "Profanity"
- Swag is not an acronym for "stuff we all get," "secretly we are gay," or anything else. It comes from early-19th-century slang for a thief's booty or loot.
- Tip is not derived from the phrase "to insure promptness" (prompt service). The word originated in the 17th century and is of uncertain origin.
- Wog and wop: see under "Ethnic slurs"

== Idioms ==
- Brass monkey weather does not refer to cold temperatures causing cannon balls to fall off a brass rack; shot was not stored in that way. An 1857 version of the idiom is "It would freeze the tail off a brass monkey", and probably refers to a common type of tourist souvenir.
- Rule of thumb is not derived from a medieval constraint on the thickness of an object with which one might beat one's wife. More likely it means that the thumb can be used to measure an approximate inch.
- Whole nine yards: The origin of the phrase "the whole nine yards" is unknown, and nearly all claimed explanations are easily proven false. Incorrect explanations include the length of machine gun belts, the capacity of concrete mixers (in cubic yards), various types of fabric, and many others. All are probably false, since most rely on nine yards when evidence suggests that the phrase began as "the whole six yards". In addition, the phrase appeared in print as early as 1907, while many explanations require a much later date of origin.

== Other ==
- 420 did not originate as the Los Angeles police or penal code for marijuana use. Police Code 420 is "juvenile disturbance", and Penal Code 420 defines the prevention, hindrance, or obstruction of legal "entry, settlement, or residence" on "any tract of public land" as a misdemeanor. Some LA police codes that do relate to illegal drugs include 10-50 ("under influence of drugs"), 966 ("drug deal"), 11300 ("narcotics"), and 23105 ("driver under narcotics"). The number's association with marijuana originated with a group of students who would meet on the campus of San Rafael High School at 4:20 pm to smoke.
- Adamant is often believed to have come from Latin adamare, meaning to love to excess. It is in fact derived from Greek ἀδάμας, meaning indomitable. There was a further confusion about whether the substance referred to is diamond or lodestone.
- Bombast: There is a common misconception that bombast is a reference to the family name Bombast von Hohenheim of Paracelsus in reference to his outrageous remarks. It is rather about the material Bombast, used as padding, rather like the similar extended meaning of Fustian.
- Buck: The use of "buck" to mean "dollar" did not originate from a practice of referring to African slaves as "bucks" (male deer) when trading. "Buck" was originally short for "buckskin", as buckskins were used in trade.
- Butterfly: The word "butterfly" did not originate from "flutterby". It is, as it appears, a compound of "butter" and "fly", first formed in Old English: it comes from the Middle English word butterflye, which in turn comes from the Old English word butorflēoge.
- Chav: This pejorative UK term for a person of low social class or graces does not originate from "Chatham-" or "Cheltenham Average", nor is it an acronym for "Council Housed And Violent". It comes from a word meaning "boy" in the Romani language.
- Crowbar: A "crowbar" is not so named for its use by Black menial workers, but rather for its forked end, which resembles a crow's foot.
- Easter: The name of the holiday has no connection to the Mesopotamian goddess Ishtar nor its likely analog Astarte. Its Old English name Eostre was derived from the same etymology as the direction "east," both based upon the dawn of the sun, and may or may not have shared a name with a pagan goddess. In the Latin language that dominated Western Christianity until the Reformation, along with the Romance languages that evolved from Latin, Easter is named "Pascha" or some derivative thereof, from the name of Passover.
- Emoji: These pictographic characters are often mistakenly believed to be a simplified form of the word emoticon, itself a portmanteau of "emotion icon". However, emoji is a Japanese term composed from "e" (image) and "moji" (character).
- Faggot: The origin of the slur usage of the word "faggot" (originally referring to a bundle of firewood) may be from the term for women used in a similar way to "baggage", i.e. something heavy to be dealt with. The usage may also have been influenced by the British term "fag", meaning a younger schoolboy who acts as an older schoolboy's servant.
- Female and male: the terms have different etymologies. Male originates from Old French masle, a shortened form of Latin masculus. Female originates from Medieval Latin femella, a diminutive of femina.
- The fluorescent lamp did not derive its name from the fictional Filipino inventor Agapito Flores.
- Handicap: The word "handicap" did not originate as a metathetic corruption of "cap in hand" in reference to disabled beggars. The word originally referred to the game hand-i'-cap, in which forfeits were placed in a cap to equalize the game.
- Helicopter is often erroneously thought to consist of heli- and -copter, while in fact it stems from the greek helix-, meaning spiral, and -pter, meaning wing.
- Hiccough, an alternate spelling still encountered for hiccup, originates in an assumption that the second syllable was originally cough. The word is in fact onomatopoeic in origin.
- History does not derive from "His story" (that is, a version of the past from which the acts of women and girls are systemically excluded) but from the Greek word ἱστορία, historia, meaning "inquiry."
- Innocent: often wrongly believed to have the original meaning of "not knowing", as if it came from Latin noscere (to know); in fact it comes from nocere (to harm), and the primary sense is "harmless".
- Isle and island: The word "isle" is not short for "island", nor is the word "island" an extension of "isle"; the words are unrelated. "Isle" comes ultimately from Latin īnsula, meaning "island"; "island" comes ultimately from Old English īegland, also meaning "island", or technically "island land" (cf. Icelandic ey "island"). The spelling island with an S, however, is indeed due to the influence of isle.
- Marmalade: there is an apocryphal story that Mary, Queen of Scots, ate it when she had a headache, and that the name is derived from her maids' whisper of "Marie est malade" (Mary is ill). In fact it is derived from Portuguese marmelada, meaning quince jam, and then expanded from quince jam to other fruit preserves. It is found in English-language sources written before Mary was even born.
- Nasty: The term nasty was not derived from the surname of Thomas Nast as a reference to his biting, vitriolic cartoons. The word may be related to the Dutch word nestig, or "dirty". It predates Nast by several centuries, appearing in the most famous sentence of Thomas Hobbes's Leviathan, that in the state of nature, the life of man is "solitary, poor, nasty, brutish, and short". That work was published in 1651, whereas Nast was born in 1840.
- Niggardly: The word "niggardly", meaning stingy or miserly, is not actually related to the racial slur "nigger", despite the similar sound. Like "niggle", it may derive from Old Norse nigla, meaning "to fuss about small matters"; alternatively, it may derive from another Germanic root meaning "exact" or "careful". Meanwhile, "nigger", like "Negro", traces back to Latin niger, meaning "black".
- Nonce (in computing): despite claims that the word is a portmanteau of "number used once" or similar, the term actually dates to Middle English and originates from rebracketing "then anes" ("the one [purpose]").
- Picnic: The word "picnic" did not originate as an abbreviation of "pick a nigger", a phrase falsely claimed to have been used by white families at community lynchings in the 19th century. "Picnic" comes from 17th-century French piquenique, which is of uncertain origin.
- Pumpernickel is said to have been given the name by a French man (sometimes Napoleon) referring to his horse, Nicole—"Il étoit bon pour Nicole" ("It was good enough for Nicole"), or "C'est une pomme pour Nicole" ("It's an apple for Nicole") or "C'est du pain pour Nicole" ("It's bread for Nicole"). Some dictionaries claim a derivation from the German vernacular Pumpern (fart) and "Nick" (demon or devil), though others disagree.
- Sincere does not originate from Latin sine cera ("without wax"), but from sincerus ("true, genuine"), which combines roots meaning "single" and "grow".
- Snob does not originate from Latin sine nobilitate ("without nobility").
- Till is not an abbreviation of "until", though the increasingly common spelling 'til is a result of this misconception. In fact, "till" is the older word; "until" is a compound of "till" and the Old Norse prefix "und-" ("up to", "as far as"), just as "unto" is a compound of that prefix and "to".
- Welsh rarebit has been claimed to be the original spelling of the savoury dish "Welsh rabbit". Both forms now have currency, though the form with "rabbit" is in fact the original. Furthermore, the word "Welsh" in this context was used in a pejorative sense, meaning "foreign" or "substandard", and does not indicate that the dish originated in Wales.
- Wi-Fi is not short-form for 'Wireless Fidelity,' although it was likely co-opting the similar phrase of the time, Hi-Fi, referring to High Fidelity audio systems.
- Woman does not originate from "woven from man", nor from "womb". It came from the Old English wifmann ("woman human"), a compound of wif ("woman" – cf. "wife") + man ("human being"). Adult human males were called wer (as in weregeld and world, and also the first element in "werewolf", man-wolf). Mann, the word for "person", eventually came to be used for adult human males specifically. Both "wer" and "wyf" may be used to qualify "man", as in this Old English example:

God gesceop ða æt fruman twegen men, wer and wif
(then at the beginning, God created two human beings, man and woman)

- Yankee does not originate from the Cherokee word eankke meaning "coward". The word does not exist in the Cherokee language. It also does not come from a native tribe called the Yankoo meaning "invincible". No tribe has existed under that name. The word probably has Dutch origins.

== See also ==
- List of common English usage misconceptions
- List of common misconceptions
