= Fuck =

English-language profanity

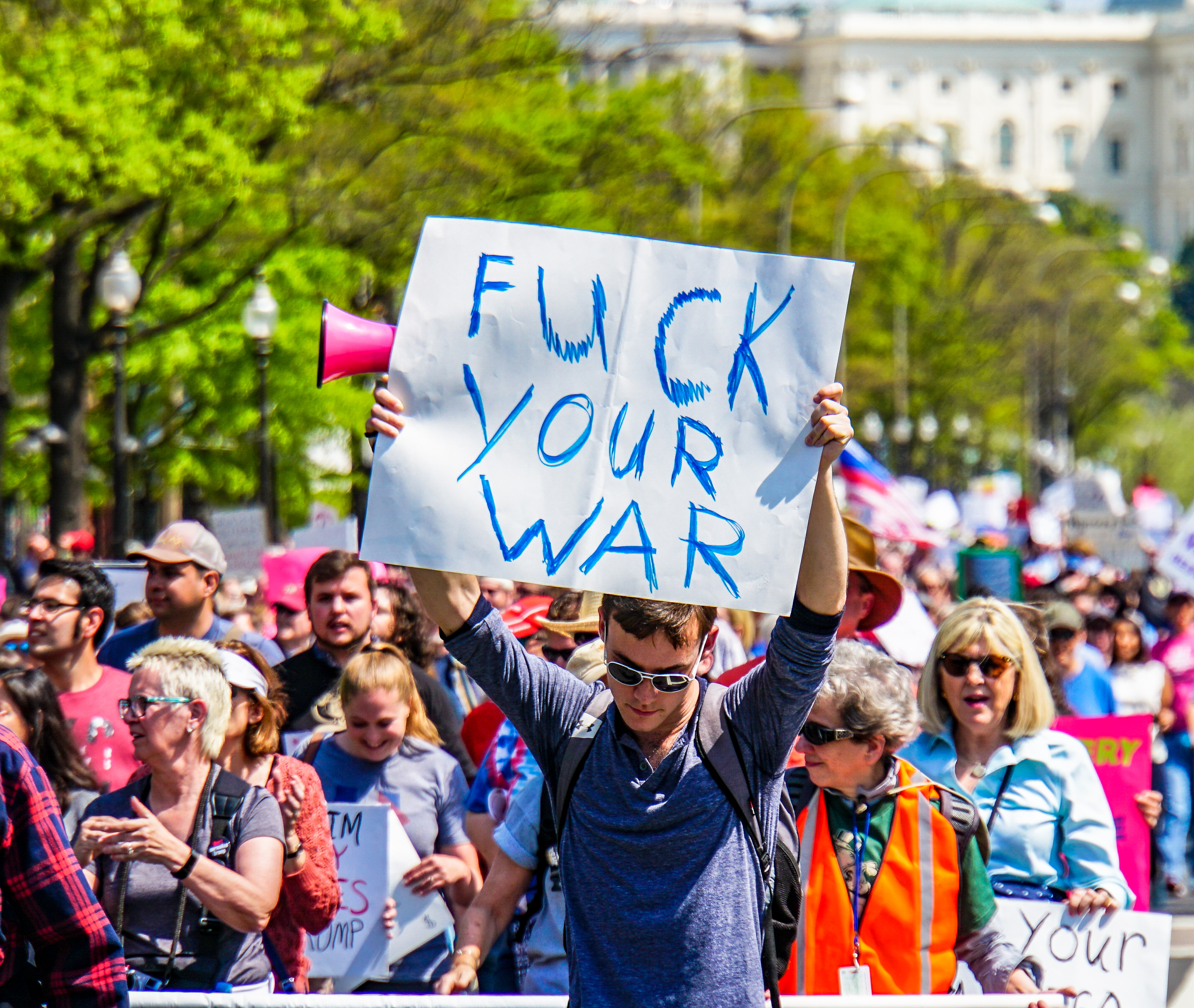
A protester's sign using the word on Tax March Day, April 15, 2017 in Washington, D.C. U.S.

Fuck (/fʌk/) is a profanity in the English language. It often refers to the act of sexual intercourse, but it is most commonly used as an intensifier or to convey disdain. While its origin is obscure, it is usually considered to be first attested to around 1475. In modern usage, the term fuck and its derivatives (such as fucker and fucking) are used as a noun, a verb, an adjective, an infix, an interjection, or an adverb. There are many common phrases that employ the word as well as compounds that incorporate it, such as motherfucker and fuck off.

== Offensiveness ==
It is unclear whether the word has always been considered a pejorative or, if not, when it first came to be used to describe unpleasant circumstances or people in an intentionally offensive way. Some English-speaking countries censor it on television and radio. Andrea Millwood Hargrave's 2000 study of the attitudes of the British public found that fuck was considered the third-most-severe profanity, and its derivative motherfucker second. Cunt was considered the most severe.

Nevertheless, the word has increasingly become less of a pejorative and more publicly acceptable, an example of the "dysphemism treadmill" or semantic drift known as melioration, wherein former pejoratives become inoffensive and commonplace. Because of its increasing usage in the public forum, in 2005 the word was included for the first time as one of three vulgarities in The Canadian Press's Canadian Press Caps and Spelling guide. Journalists were advised to refrain from censoring the word but use it sparingly and only when its inclusion was essential to the story. According to linguist Pamela Hobbs, "notwithstanding its increasing public use, enduring cultural models that inform our beliefs about the nature of sexuality and sexual acts preserve its status as a vile utterance that continues to inspire moral outrage." Hobbs considers users rather than usage of the word and subdivides users into "non-users", for whom "the word belongs to a set of taboo words, the very utterance of which constitutes an affront, and any use of the word, regardless of its form (verb, adjective, adverb, etc.) or meaning (literal or metaphorical) evokes the core sexual meanings and associated sexual imagery that motivate the taboo"; and "users", for whom "metaphorical uses of the word fuck no more evoke images of sexual intercourse than does a ten-year-old's 'My mom'll kill me if she finds out' evokes images of murder" so that the "criteria of taboo are missing."

== Etymology ==
=== Germanic cognates ===
The Oxford English Dictionary states that the ultimate etymology is uncertain, but that the word is "probably cognate" with a number of Germanic words with meanings involving striking, rubbing, and having sex or is derivative of the Old French word that meant 'to have sex'.

The word has probable cognates in other Germanic languages, such as German ficken ('to fuck'); Dutch fokken ('to breed', 'to beget'); Afrikaans fok ('to fuck'); Icelandic fokka ('to mess around', 'to rush'); dialectal Norwegian fukka ('to copulate'); and dialectal Swedish focka ('to strike', 'to copulate') and fock ('penis'). This points to a possible etymology where Common Germanic *fuk(k)ōn-from the verbal root *fug- ('to blow') comes from an Indo-European root *peuk-, or *peuĝ- ('to strike'), cognate with non-Germanic words such as Latin pugno ('I fight') or pugnus ('fist'). By application of Grimm's law, this hypothetical root also has the Pre-Germanic form *pug-néh_{2}- ('to blow'), which is the etymon of, amongst others, Dutch fok(zeil) ('foresail'). There is a theory that fuck is most likely derived from German or Dutch roots, and is probably not derived from an Old English root.

=== False etymologies ===
One reason that the word fuck is difficult to trace etymologically is that it was used far more extensively in common speech, rather than in easily traceable documents or writings. There exist multiple urban legends that advance false etymologies, including the word allegedly being an acronym. One of these urban legends is that the word fuck originated in Irish law. If a couple was caught committing adultery, the two would be punished "For Unlawful Carnal Knowledge In the Nude", with "FUCKIN" written on the stocks above to denote the crime. A variant of this legend alleges church clerks to have recorded the crime of "Forbidden Use of Carnal Knowledge". Another legend places the origin on a royal permission allegedly granted during the Middle Ages. Due to the Black Death and the consequent scarcity of resources, villages and towns supposedly attempted to control population growth by requiring permission to engage in intercourse. Royal permission (usually from a local magistrate or lord) is said to have required placing a sign visible from the road reading: "Fornicating/Fornication Under Consent of King", later shortened to FUCK. This story is not supported by written evidence, and has been proven false, but has persisted in oral and literary traditions for many years.

Another legendary etymology, first made popular by the American radio show Car Talk, says that the phrase fuck you derives from pluck yew in connection with a misconception regarding the origins of the V sign. This misconception states that English archers believed that those who were captured by the French had their index and middle fingers cut off so that they could no longer operate their longbows, and that the V sign was used by uncaptured and victorious archers in a display of defiance against the French. The addition of the phrase fuck you to the misconception came when it was claimed that the English yelled that they could still pluck yew, (yew wood being the preferred material for longbows at the time), a phrase that evolved into the modern fuck you. In any event, the word fuck has been in use far too long for some of these supposed origins to be possible. Since no such acronym was ever recorded before the 1960s according to the lexicographical work The F-Word, such claims create at best a so-called "backronym".

== Grammar ==
In terms of its parts of speech, fuck has a very flexible role in English grammar, functioning as both a transitive and intransitive verb, and as an adjective, adverb, noun, and interjection.

Fuck and related constructions in the Oxford English Dictionary

Although the word itself is used in its literal sense to refer to sexual intercourse, its most common usage is figurative—to indicate the speaker's strong sentiment and to offend or shock the listener. Linguist Geoffrey Hughes found eight distinct usages for English curse words, and fuck can apply to each. For example, it fits in the "curse" sense (fuck you!), as well as the "personal" sense (You fucker). In the Oxford English Dictionary, more than a hundred different senses, usages and collocations (like fuck around, fuck with s.o., fuck you, fuck me, fuck it) are identified for fuck, its derived forms (like fucker, fuckee, fuckability), and compounds with fuck (e.g. fuckfest, fuckhole, fuckface).

== Early usage ==
In 2015, Paul Booth argued that he had found "(possibly) the earliest known use of the word 'fuck' that clearly has a sexual connotation": in English court records of 1310–11, a man local to Chester is referred to as "Roger Fuckebythenavele", probably a nickname. "Either this refers to an inexperienced copulator, referring to someone trying to have sex with the navel, or it's a rather extravagant explanation for a dimwit, someone so stupid they think that this is the way to have sex", says Booth. An earlier name, that of John le Fucker recorded in 1278, has been the subject of debate, but is thought by many philologists to have had some separate and non-sexual origin.

Otherwise, the usually accepted first known occurrence of the word is found in code in a poem in a mixture of Latin and English composed in the 15th century. The poem, which satirizes the Carmelite friars of Cambridge, England, takes its title, "Flen flyys", from the first words of its opening line, Flen, flyys, and freris ('Fleas, flies, and friars'). The line that contains fuck reads Non sunt in coeli, quia gxddbov xxkxzt pg ifmk. Deciphering the phrase gxddbou xxkxzt pg ifmk, here by replacing each letter by the previous letter in alphabetical order, as the English alphabet was then, yields the macaronic non sunt in coeli, quia fuccant vvivys of heli, which translated means, 'They are not in heaven, because they fuck the women of Ely'. The phrase was probably encoded because it accused monks of breaking their vows of celibacy; it is uncertain to what extent the word fuck was considered acceptable at the time. The stem of fuccant is an English word used as Latin. In the Middle English of this poem, the term wife was still used generically for 'woman'.

William Dunbar's 1503 poem "Brash of Wowing" includes the lines: "Yit be his feiris he wald haue fukkit: / Ye brek my hairt, my bony ane" (ll. 13–14).

The oldest known occurrence of the word in adjectival form (which implies use of the verb) in English comes from the margins of a 1528 manuscript copy of Cicero's De Officiis. A monk had scrawled in the margin notes, "fuckin Abbot". Whether the monk meant the word literally, to accuse this abbot of "questionable monastic morals", or whether he used it "as an intensifier, to convey his extreme dismay" is unclear.

John Florio's 1598 Italian–English dictionary, A Worlde of Wordes, included the term, along with several now-archaic, but then-vulgar synonyms, in this definition:

- Fottere: To jape, to sard, to fucke, to swive, to occupy.

Of these, "occupy" and "jape" still survive as verbs, though with less profane meanings, while "sard" was a descendant of the Anglo-Saxon verb seordan (or seorðan, ON serða), to copulate; and "swive" had derived from earlier swīfan, to revolve i.e. to swivel (compare modern-day "screw"). As late as the 18th century, the verb occupy was seldom used in print because it carried sexual overtones.

A 1790 poem by St. George Tucker has a father upset with his bookish son say "I'd not give [a fuck] for all you've read". Originally printed as "I'd not give ------ for all you've read", scholars agree that the words a fuck were removed, making the poem the first recorded instance of the now-common phrase I don't give a fuck.

Farmer and Henley's 1893 dictionary of slang notes both the adverbial and adjectival forms of fuck as similar to but "more violent" than bloody and indicating extreme insult, respectively.

== Modern usage ==
The modern usage and flexibility of fuck was established by the mid-to-late 19th century, and has been fairly stable since. Most literally, to fuck is to have sex, but it is also used as a more general expletive or intensifier.

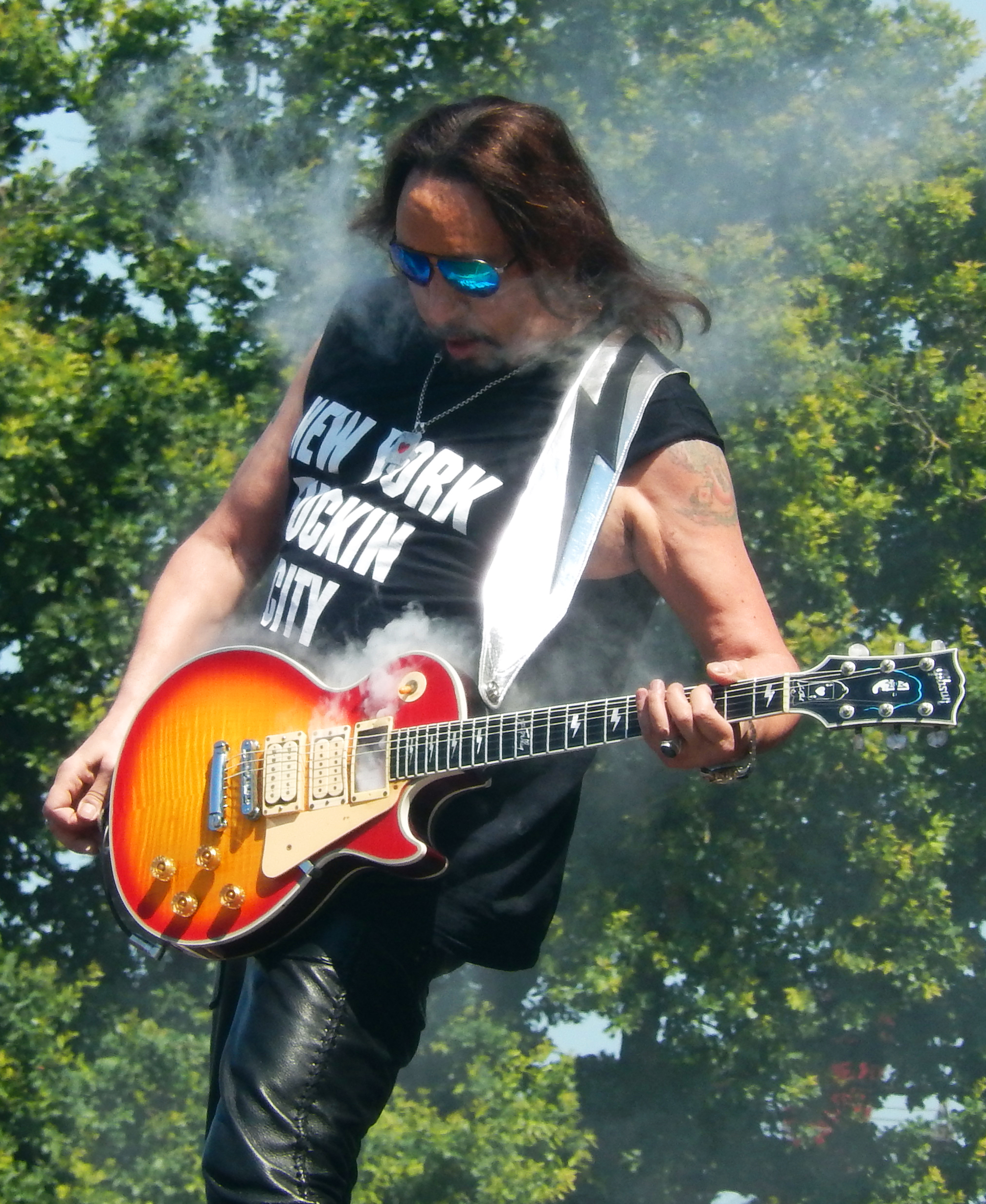
Guitarist Ace Frehley with T-shirt "New York Fuckin City"

Insertion of the trochaic word fucking can also be used as an exercise for diagnosing the cadence of an English-language word. This is the use of fuck or more specifically fucking as an infix, or more properly, a tmesis (see expletive infixation). For example, the word in-fucking-credible sounds acceptable to the English ear, and is in fairly common use, while *incred-fucking-ible would sound very clumsy (though, depending on the context, this might be perceived as a humorous improvisation of the word). Abso-fucking-lutely and motherfucking are also common uses of fuck as an affix. While neither dysphemistic nor connected to the sexual connotations of the word, even the vacuous usages are considered offensive and gratuitous, such as This is fucking awesome! Fuck has colloquial usage as a verb, adverb, adjective, conjunction, interjection, noun, and pronoun.

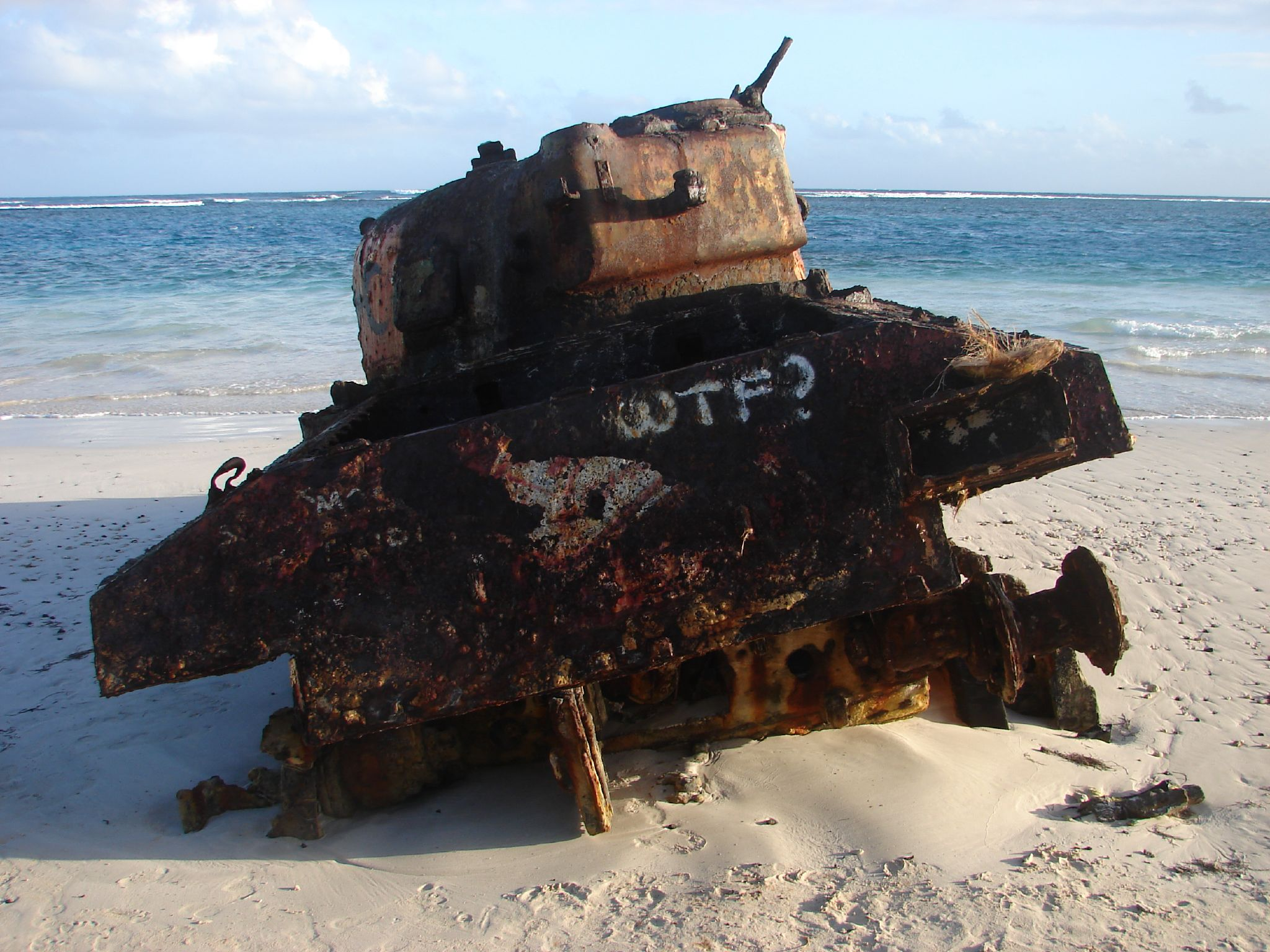
"WTF?" spray painted on the rear of a Sherman tank left over from US military shelling practice on Flamenco Beach on the island of Culebra, Puerto Rico

The word fuck is a component of many acronyms, some of which—like SNAFU (Situation Normal: All Fucked Up) and FUBAR (Fucked Up Beyond All Recognition)—date as far back as World War II. MILF (Mother I'd Like to Fuck) and variations of the first letter are widely seen in pornographic contexts. Many more recent coinages, such as the shorthand WTF? for 'what the fuck', STFU for 'shut the fuck up', or FML for 'fuck my life', have been widely extant on the Internet, and may count as examples of internet memes. Many acronyms will also have an F or MF added to increase emphasis; for example, OMG ('oh my God') becomes OMFG ('oh my fucking God'). Abbreviations involving fuck can be considered less offensive than fuck itself. Although the word is proclaimed vulgar, several comedians rely on fuck for comedic routines. George Carlin created several literary works based upon the word, including his routine "seven dirty words"—words that were bleep censored on US television.

"Fuck all" is a widely recognised, mainly in the United Kingdom and Australia, expression meaning "none", "nothing", or "very little".

=== Examples of more recent usage ===
In 1928, English writer D. H. Lawrence's novel Lady Chatterley's Lover gained notoriety for its frequent use of the words fuck and fucking. The Catcher in the Rye by J. D. Salinger featured the use of fuck you in print. First published in the United States in 1951, the novel remains controversial to this day due in part to its use of the word, standing at number 13 for the most banned books from 1990 to 2000 according to the American Library Association.

Actress Miriam Margolyes has claimed that she was the first to unintentionally say the word on the quiz show University Challenge in 1963; representing Newnham College, Cambridge. She claims to have uttered the word in frustration over an incorrect answer. The word was "bleeped out" for transmission. However, the first documented deliberate use of the word fuck on live British television has been attributed to theatre critic Kenneth Tynan in 1965, though it has been claimed Irish playwright Brendan Behan used the word on Panorama in 1956 or the man who painted the railings on Stranmillis Embankment alongside the River Lagan in Belfast, who in 1959 told Ulster TV's teatime magazine programme Roundabout that his job was "fucking boring".

The Bill Grundy incident was a controversy that ensued in 1976 when Today host Bill Grundy interviewed the Sex Pistols, after guitarist Steve Jones called Grundy a "dirty fucker" and a "fucking rotter".

The word began to break into cinema when it was uttered once in the film Vapor (1963) and in two Andy Warhol films – Poor Little Rich Girl (1965) and My Hustler (1965), and later in each of two 1967 British releases, Ulysses and I'll Never Forget What's'isname. It was used several times in the 1969 British film Bronco Bullfrog. According to director Robert Altman, the first time the word fuck was used in a major American studio film was in 1970s M*A*S*H, spoken by Painless during the football match at the end of the film.

Early examples of the word "fuck" featuring in music, although adlibbed in the studio rather than being a true part of the lyrics, include drummer Lynn Easton's exclamation 55 seconds into the Kingsmen's "Louie Louie" (1963), or the discreet "fucking hell" buried in the mix of the Beatles' "Hey Jude" (1968). MC5 and Jefferson Airplane both used the term "motherfuckers" on their respective 1969 songs "Kick Out the Jams" (from MC5's live album of the same name) and "We Can Be Together" (from Volunteers). Elektra Records created a request clean version of Kick Out the Jams for those offended by the MC5's usage, whereas RCA Records initially refused to release Volunteers uncensored until the band pointed out the label had already released the Hair cast recording with the term. Use of the term "fuck" was still a rare occurrence on rock records in 1976 when the band Doctors of Madness used the word in their song "Out". The Sex Pistols also notoriously used the term on music a year later.

=== Use in politics ===
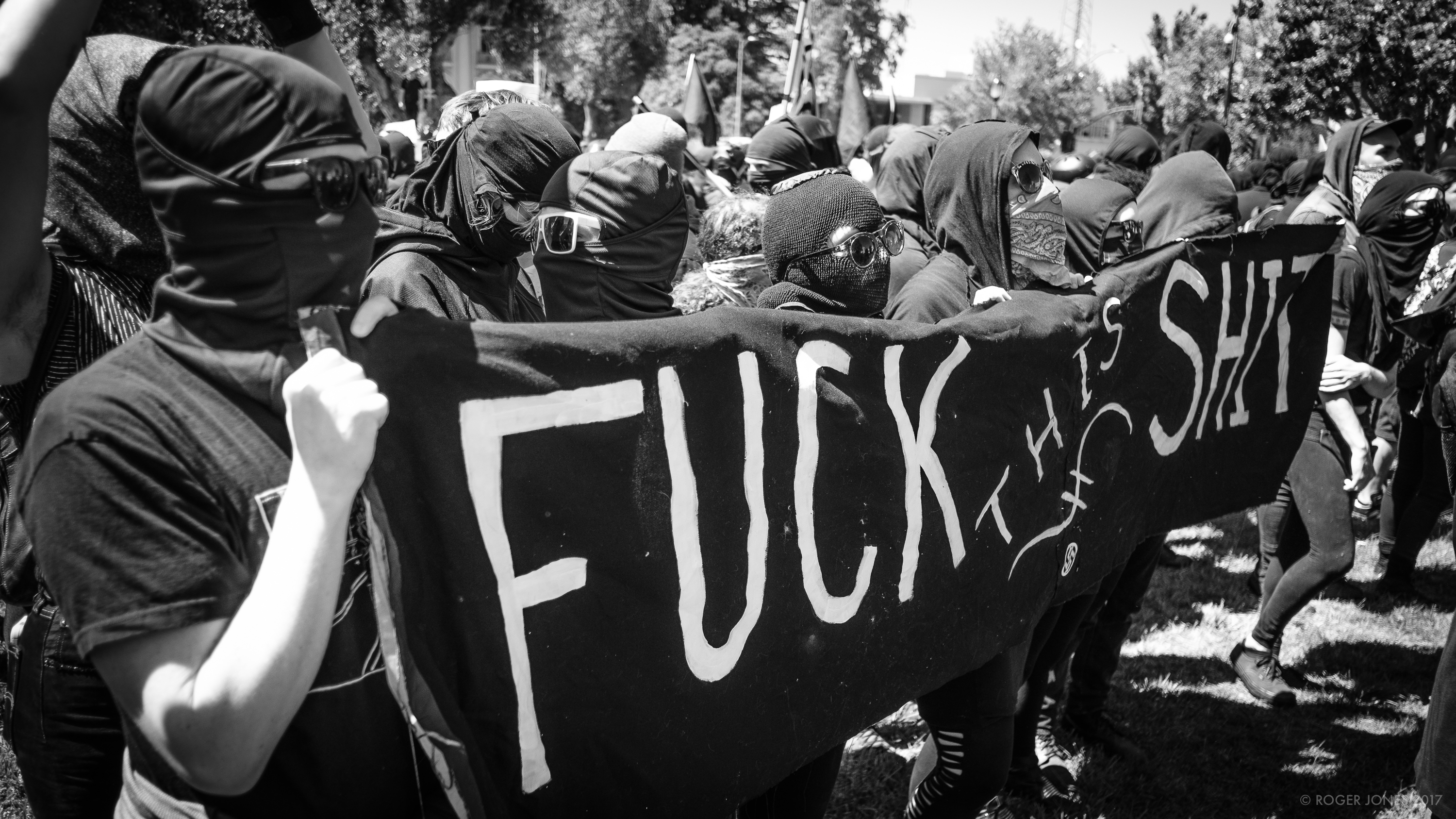
Antifa rally at Berkeley protests on August 27, 2017

Fuck is not widely used in politics, and political norms often establish the use of profanity as taboo. When politicians say "fuck", they may be perceived as expressing exasperation, and their language can be lauded as straightforward communication or criticised as vulgar.

=== Use in marketing ===
In April 1997, clothing retailer French Connection began branding their clothes with fcuk (usually written in lowercase), stating it was an acronym for "French Connection United Kingdom". Its similarity to the word fuck caused controversy. French Connection produced a range of T-shirts with messages such as "fcuk this", "hot as fcuk", "cool as fcuk", "fcuk fashion", etc.

In 2009, the European Union's OHIM trade marks agency disallowed a German brewery to market a beer called "Fucking Hell". The brewery sued, and on March 26, 2010, got permission to market the beer. The company argued that it was actually named after the Austrian village of Fucking (now spelled Fugging) and the German term for light beer, hell (which is simply the word for "light-coloured").

Iancu v. Brunetti is a United States Supreme Court case in which the owner of the clothing brand FUCT (supposedly standing for "Friends U Can't Trust") sued the Patent and Trademark Office, which refused to trademark the name for being "scandalous" under the Lanham Act. The Supreme Court ruled in 2019 that a provision in 15 U.S.C. § 1052(a) of the Act, denying registration to any trademarks seen as consisting of immoral or scandalous matter, was an unconstitutional restriction of applicants' freedom of speech.

=== Band names ===
The word fuck has been used in a number of band names, such as Fucked Up, generally based on common compounds. Many of these bands fall into the genres of punk and metal, while some fall into the categories of electronic rock and pop, such as Holy Fuck and Fuck Buttons.

=== F-bomb ===
An image of a nuclear explosion along with a giant letter F, resembling the word "F-bomb".

The phrase dropping an F-bomb usually refers to the unanticipated use of the word fuck in an unexpected setting, such as public media, a play on the nickname for the hydrogen bomb (the "H-bomb") and the shock value that using the word fuck in discourse carries. The term was first reported in a newspaper (Newsday) in 1988 when Hall of Fame baseball catcher Gary Carter used it. In 2012, it was listed, for the first time, in the mainstream Merriam-Webster's Collegiate Dictionary.

== Censorship ==
In the United States, the word is frequently edited out of music and films when broadcast on TV, such as in the film The Big Lebowski, when John Goodman's character repeatedly yells, "This is what happens when you fuck a stranger in the ass". It was censored on television as "This is what happens when you find a stranger in the Alps." The line inspired the title of singer Phoebe Bridgers's first album, Stranger In The Alps.

In 1971, the US Supreme Court decided that the public display of fuck is protected under the First and Fourteenth amendments and cannot be made a criminal offense. In 1968, Paul Robert Cohen had been convicted of disturbing the peace for wearing a jacket with the slogan "Fuck the Draft" (in a reference to conscription in the Vietnam War). The conviction was upheld by the court of appeals and overturned by the Supreme Court in Cohen v. California.

== Common alternatives ==
In conversation or writing, reference to or use of the word fuck may be replaced by any of many alternative words or phrases, including the F-word, the F-bomb, or simply, eff/f (as in What the eff/F or You effing/f'ing fool). Also, there are many commonly used substitutes, such as flipping, frigging, fricking, freaking, feck, fudge, flaming, forget or any of a number of similar-sounding nonsense words. In print, there are alternatives such as, F***, F––k, etc.; or a string of non-alphanumeric characters, for example, @$#*%! and similar (especially favored in comic books).

A replacement word that was used mainly on Usenet newsgroups is fsck, derived from the name of the Unix file system checking utility.

== See also ==
- Army creole – Dialect associated with military culture
- Four-letter word – Euphemism for profanity
- Harcourt interpolation – British scandal
- List of common false etymologies of English words § Profanity
- List of films that most frequently use the word fuck
- Madonna on the Late Show with David Letterman in 1994 – Controversial live television incident
- Profanity – Socially offensive form of language
- Russian warship, go fuck yourself – Ukrainian slogan
- Seven dirty words – Words traditionally disallowed in U.S. broadcast radio and television
- Sexual slang – Terms and phrases relating to sexual activities
- Shit – Vulgar English word
- The finger (aka the middle finger), a related hand gesture
- The Pope Song – 2010 song by Tim Minchin

== Sources ==
- Sheidlower, Jesse (2009). The F-word (3rd ed.). Oxford University Press. ISBN 978-0-19-975155-6.
- Mohr, Melissa (2013). Holy Sh*t: A Brief History of Swearing. Oxford University Press. ISBN 978-0199742677.
