= Rule of thumb =

Approximate method for doing something

In English, the phrase rule of thumb refers to an approximate method for doing something, based on practical experience rather than theory. This usage of the phrase can be traced back to the 17th century and has been associated with various trades where quantities were measured by comparison to the width or length of a thumb.

A modern folk etymology holds that the phrase is derived from the maximum width of a stick allowed for wife-beating under English common law, but no such law ever existed. This belief may have originated in a rumored statement by 18th-century judge Sir Francis Buller that a man may beat his wife with a stick no wider than his thumb. Despite there being no record that Buller ever said this, the rumor produced numerous jokes and satirical cartoons at his expense, with Buller being ridiculed as "Judge Thumb".

English jurist Sir William Blackstone wrote in his Commentaries on the Laws of England of an "old law" that once allowed "moderate" beatings by husbands, but he did not mention thumbs or any specific implements. Wife-beating has been officially outlawed for centuries in England and the United States, but continued in practice; several 19th-century American court rulings referred to an "ancient doctrine" that the judges believed had allowed husbands to physically punish their wives using implements no thicker than their thumbs.

The phrase rule of thumb first became associated with domestic abuse in the 1970s, after which the spurious legal definition was cited as factual in a number of law journals; the United States Commission on Civil Rights published a report on domestic abuse titled "Under the Rule of Thumb" in 1982. Some efforts were made to discourage the phrase, which was seen as taboo owing to this false origin. During the 1990s, several authors correctly identified the spurious etymology; however, the connection to domestic violence was cited in some legal sources into the early 2000s.

== Origin and usage ==
The exact origin of the phrase is uncertain. Its earliest (1685) appearance in print comes from a posthumously published collection of sermons by Scottish preacher James Durham: "Many profest Christians are like to foolish builders, who build by guess, and by rule of thumb (as we use to speak), and not by Square and Rule."

The phrase is also found in Sir William Hope's The Compleat Fencing Master (1692): "What he doth, he doth by rule of Thumb, and not by Art." James Kelly's The Complete Collection of Scottish Proverbs, 1721, includes: "No Rule so good as Rule of Thumb, if it hit", meaning a practical approximation.

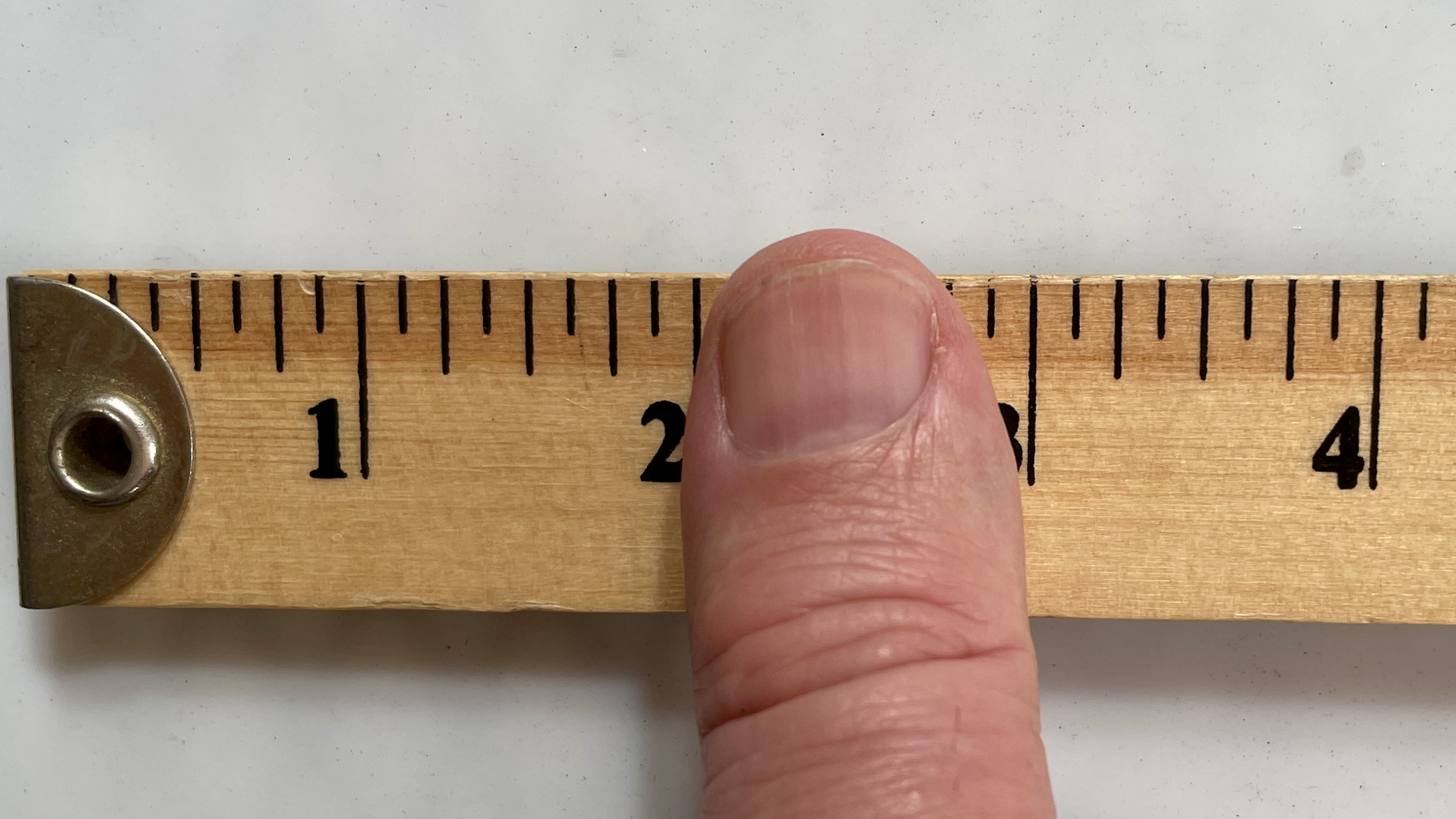
An adult's thumb is about one inch wide, so it can be used to estimate the size of an object.

Historically, the width of the thumb, or "thumb's breadth", was used as the equivalent of an inch in the cloth trade; similar expressions existed in Latin and French as well. The thumb has also been used in brewing beer, to gauge the heat of the brewing vat. Ebenezer Cobham Brewer writes that rule of thumb means a "rough measurement". He says that "Ladies often measure yard lengths by their thumb. Indeed, the expression 'sixteen nails make a yard' seems to point to the thumb-nail as a standard" and that "Countrymen always measure by their thumb." According to Phrasefinder, "The phrase joins the whole nine yards as one that probably derives from some form of measurement but which is unlikely ever to be definitively pinned down."

== Folk etymology ==
=== English common law ===
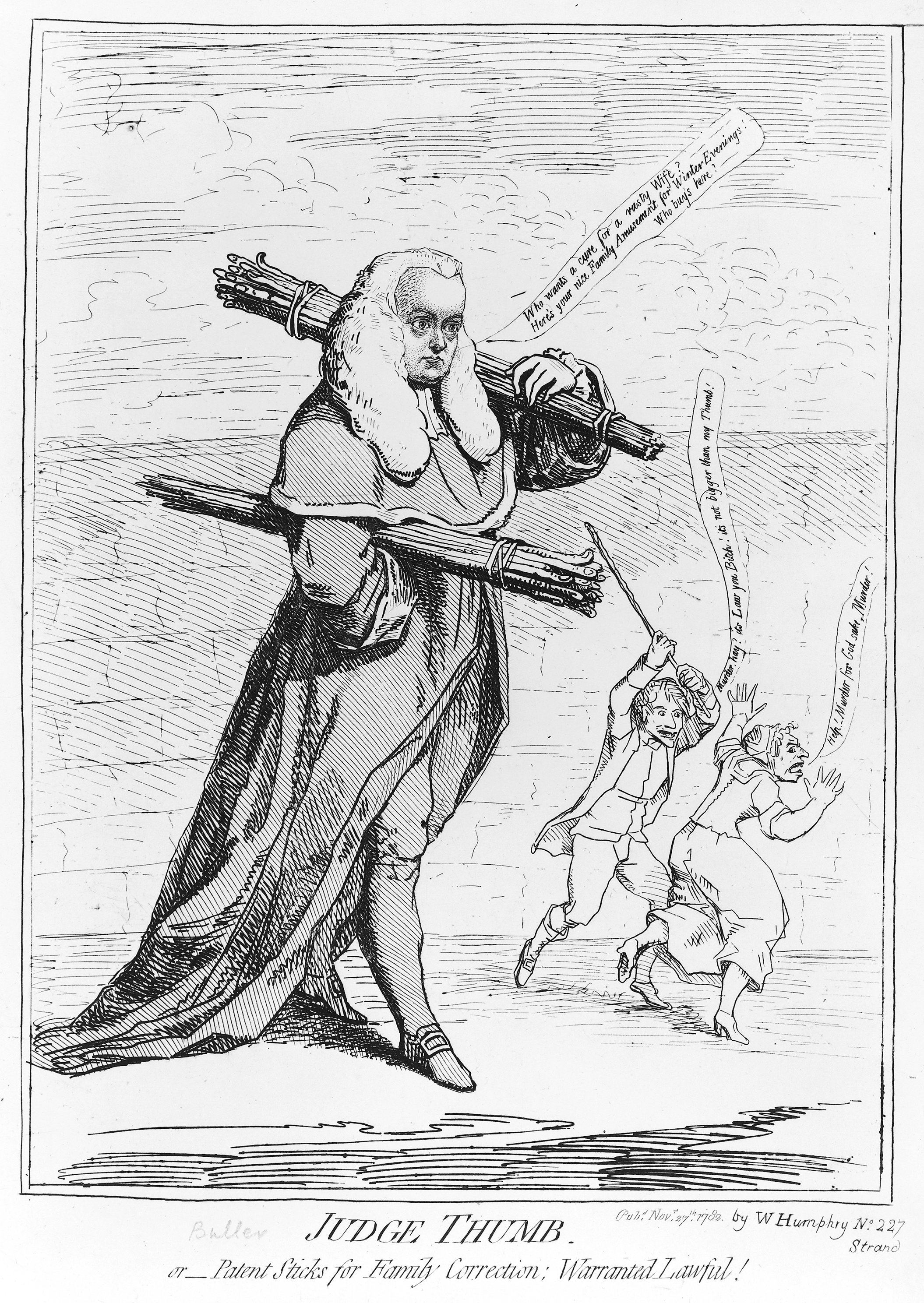
Cartoon by James Gillray satirizing Sir Francis Buller, 1782: "Judge Thumb; or, Patent Sticks for Family Correction: Warranted Lawful!"

A modern folk etymology relates the phrase to domestic violence via an alleged rule under English common law which permitted wife-beating provided that the implement used was a rod or stick no thicker than a man's thumb. Wife-beating has been officially outlawed in England and the United States for centuries, but enforcement of the law was inconsistent, and wife-beating did continue. However, a rule of thumb permitting wife-beating was never codified in law.

English jurist William Blackstone wrote in the late 1700s in his Commentaries on the Laws of England that, by an "old law", a husband had formerly been justified in using "moderate correction" against his wife but was barred from inflicting serious violence; Blackstone did not mention either thumbs or sticks. According to Blackstone, this custom was in doubt by the late 1600s, and a woman was allowed "security of the peace" against an abusive husband. (Note: One of Blackstone's sources was jurist Sir Matthew Hale who ruled in 1674 that a husband may admonish his wife and confine her to the house but not beat her.) Twentieth-century legal scholar William L. Prosser wrote that there was "probably no truth to the legend" that a husband was allowed to beat his wife "with a stick no thicker than his thumb".

The association between the thumb and implements of domestic violence can be traced to 1782, when English judge Sir Francis Buller was ridiculed for purportedly stating that a husband could beat his wife, provided that he used a stick no wider than his thumb. (Note: Whether Buller was supposed to have meant his own thumb or the husband's is unknown. One history states, "A witty countess is said to have sent the next day to require the measurements of his thumb, that she might know the extent of her husband's right".) There is no record of Buller making such a statement, but the rumor generated much satirical press, with Buller being mocked as "Judge Thumb" in published jokes and cartoons.

In the following century, several court rulings in the United States referred to a supposed common-law doctrine which the judges believed had once allowed wife-beating with an implement smaller than a thumb. None of these courts referred to such a doctrine as a rule of thumb or endorsed such a rule, but all permitted some degree of wife-beating so long as it did not result in serious injury.

=== 19th-century United States ===
An 1824 court ruling in Mississippi stated that a man was entitled to enforce "domestic discipline" by striking his wife with a whip or stick no wider than the judge's thumb. In a later case in North Carolina (State v. Rhodes, 1868), the defendant was found to have struck his wife "with a switch about the size of this fingers"; the judge found the man not guilty due to the switch being smaller than a thumb. The judgment was upheld by the state supreme court, although the later judge stated:

Nor is it true that a husband has a right to whip his wife. And if he had, it is not easily seen how the thumb is the standard of size for the instrument which he may use, as some of the old authorities have said [...] The standard is the effect produced, and not the manner of producing it, or the instrument used.

In 1873, also in North Carolina, the judge in State v. Oliver ruled, "We assume that the old doctrine that a husband had the right to whip his wife, provided that he used a switch no larger than his thumb, is not the law in North Carolina". These latter two cases were cited by the legal scholar Beirne Stedman when he wrote in a 1917 law review article that an "old common law rule" had permitted a husband to use "moderate personal chastisement on his wife" so long as he used "a switch no larger than his thumb".

By the late 19th century, most American states had outlawed wife-beating; some had severe penalties such as forty lashes or imprisonment for offenders. Although it was commonly believed in parts of the United States that a man was legally permitted to beat his wife with a stick no wider than his thumb, that belief did not have any connection with the phrase rule of thumb until a misunderstanding arose in the 1970s.

=== 20th-century feminist revival ===
In the 20th century, public concern with the problem of domestic violence declined at first, and then re-emerged along with the resurgent feminist movement in the 1970s. The first recorded link between wife-beating and the phrase rule of thumb appeared in 1976, in a report on domestic violence by women's-rights advocate Del Martin:

For instance, the common-law doctrine had been modified to allow the husband 'the right to whip his wife, provided that he used a switch no bigger than his thumb'—a rule of thumb, so to speak.

While Martin appears to have meant the phrase rule of thumb only as a figure of speech, some feminist writers treated it as a literal reference to an earlier law. The following year, a book on battered women stated:

One of the reasons nineteenth century British wives were dealt with so harshly by their husbands and by their legal system was the 'rule of thumb'. Included in the British Common Law was a section regulating wifebeating [...] The new law stipulated that the reasonable instrument be only 'a rod not thicker than his thumb.' In other words, wifebeating was legal.

Despite this erroneous reading of the common law (which is a set of judicial principles rather than a written law with individual sections) the spurious legal doctrine of the "rule of thumb" was soon mentioned in a number of law journals. The myth was repeated in a 1982 report by the United States Commission on Civil Rights on domestic abuse titled "Under the Rule of Thumb", as well as a later United States Senate report on the Violence Against Women Act.

In the late 20th century, some efforts were made to discourage the phrase rule of thumb, which was seen as taboo owing to this false origin. Patricia T. O'Conner, former editor of the New York Times Book Review, described it as "one of the most persistent myths of political correctness". During the 1990s, several authors wrote about the false etymology of rule of thumb, including English professor Henry Ansgar Kelly and conservative social critic Christina Hoff Sommers, who described its origin in a misunderstanding of Blackstone's commentary. Nonetheless, the myth persisted in some legal sources into the early 2000s.

== See also ==
- Coverture – Wife's legal status subsumed into husband's
- Heuristic – Problem-solving method
- List of common false etymologies of English words § Idioms
- Nail (unit) – Unit of cloth measurement
- Thumb signal – Hand gesture indicating approval or disapproval
