= John le Fucker =

English murderer from 1278

- Born: England
- Citizenship: English
- Known for: Surname
- Criminal charge: Double murder

Details
- Country: England

John le Fucker was an Englishman mentioned in an administrative record of 1278. His distinctive byname has been proposed by some scholars as the first written record of a variant of the English swear word fuck.

== Recorded details ==
According to an entry in the Close Rolls of the chancery of Edward I for 26 April 1278, John le Fucker was imprisoned for a double murder and seeking bail. As published in 1900 in summary calendar form, the entry reads:

John le Fucker of Tythinge, imprisoned at Peterborough for the death of Walter de Leyghton and William de Leyghton, wherewith he is charged, has letters to the sheriff of Northampton to bail him.

== Name ==
Le Fucker's unusual byname has attracted the interest of lexicographers and the public since it was highlighted by American philologist Carl Buck in his 1949 Dictionary of Selected Synonyms in the Principal Indo-European Languages. Buck suggested that the name derived from the Middle English word Fike or Fyke meaning "to fidget" – in other words, "John the Fidgeter" or perhaps more colloquially, "John the Restless". Because Buck did not cite his source, other philologists have questioned Le Fucker's historical existence.

In 1990, John Ayto brought Le Fucker to wider public attention when he claimed in his Dictionary of Word Origins that the surname was the earliest recorded instance in English of the word fuck. Ayto noted that the swear word fuck was not recorded in writing until around the start of the 16th century. But in his view, the surname shows that the word itself "was around before 1500 (perhaps not committed to paper because even then it was under a taboo)".

David Wilton rejects Ayto's theory, commenting that there is "no guarantee that this is an instance of the word fuck", but was rather a well-known 13th-century surname recorded in a variety of forms. Some of these variations were very close to "Fucker", including Foucher, Foucar, Fouchia, Fucher, Foker, and Fuker. Wilton concludes that Le Fucker's surname was "just another spelling of Fulcher (soldier)".

Robert Reisner suggested in 1971 that "it was not uncommon in the Middle Ages to have a characterizing adjectival phrase attached to one's name [i.e., a cognominal surname], such as Charles the Simple, Louis the Pious, so why not John the Fucker, if that was his most salient quality?"

Etymologist and lexicographer Allen Walker Read rejects this connection; noting that while it was commonplace at the time for people to acquire surnames reflecting their occupations, skills, places of origin, characteristics and so on, he "cannot imagine people seriously giving this activity prominence, or any man seriously accepting the name". Read argues instead that the existence of the surname shows that "fuck" could not have been in use at the time, for if it had been, "the name John le Fucker would surely have been avoided".

== See also ==
- Roger Fuckebythenavele
