= Army creole =

Dialect associated with military culture

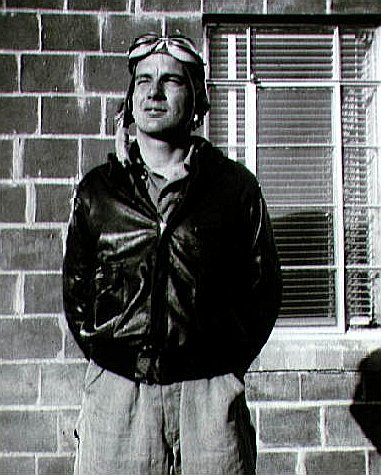
Among the original Mercury Seven astronauts, Deke Slayton was considered the most fluent in army creole.

Army creole was a term used in Tom Wolfe's book The Right Stuff to describe an English dialect spoken by military personnel. The dialect relies upon extensive use of profane intensifiers like "fuck" to gain attention in confusing circumstances requiring prompt, decisive action. Before 1980, basic training drill instructors, drill sergeants, military training instructors, and recruit division commanders used the dialect to increase the stress levels of recruits, simultaneously emphasizing a recruit's subordinate status to the instructor and increasing the probability of the recruit focusing on the instructions being provided in distracting situations. Military personnel learning the dialect in training may use it to improve communication in stressful situations.

== Historical use ==
After losing his uniform during boarding party combat aboard the sinking German submarine U-94, World War II Royal Canadian Navy officer Hal Lawrence was mistaken for a German prisoner of war following rescue by the crew of the USS Lea until Lawrence's fluency with the English military dialect convinced the American sailors of Lawrence's identity.

== Evolution ==
The term AWOL entered the vocabulary during World War I, and acronyms became increasingly important to simplify descriptions of command structure and technical innovations of mid-20th-century warfare. Technical acronyms such as radar and sonar have been widely adopted by conventional English dialects alongside profane acronyms such as snafu. Late 20th-century attempts to reduce use of profanity during United States military recruit training increased reliance on imaginative verbal descriptions of violence as an alternative means of inducing stress and gaining attention.
