= Julio García Agapito =

Peruvian environmentalist

Don Julio Gualberto García Agapito (c. February 1, 1964 – February 26, 2008) was a Peruvian environmentalist who was murdered on February 26, 2008, after reporting a shipment of illegally harvested mahogany in Peru. Don Julio was Lieutenant Governor of the town of Alerta in the Tahuamanu Province of Madre de Dios, Peru.

== Life ==
Don Julio García was a Brazil nut producer and local leader in Alerta, Peru. He was born in Iberia, a small city to the north along the Interoceanic Highway in Madre de Dios, Peru. In 1984, he moved south to Alerta. He lived there with his wife and three young children. He was known as an energetic environmentalist in the community.

== Murder of Don Julio ==
On February 26, 2008, Don Julio reported the trafficking of 34 logs of illegal mahogany to Peru's Natural Resource Management Agency, INRENA. The mahogany had been logged along the Peru-Bolivia border and driven to Alerta by Sr. Amancion Jacinto Maque, approximately 27 years old and resident of a neighboring community, and driver Sr. Angel Vivanco Gonzales in a vehicle owned by Sra. Victoria Jacinto Maque and Raul Vargas. The truck was confiscated by a police officer in Alerta and driven to the local INRENA office. While Don Julio was in the office, Sr. Vivanco attempted to steal the mahogany-laden truck. With an extra set of keys, he drove the truck off the property. The police official followed in his vehicle.

According to a witness account taken by the Human Rights Office of the Parochial Defense Council of Iberia (Defensoría Parroquial de Iberia), Sr. Jacinto entered the INRENA office and shot at Don Julio 10 times. Eight of the bullets hit their mark. Don Julio died instantly in front of two witnesses. Sr. Jacinto fled the premises and allegedly crossed the border into Peru. He has not been seen since. Neither Sr. Vivanco nor Sra. Victoria Jacinto Maque has been charged with any crime.

The truck carrying illegal mahogany was eventually recaptured and the wood confiscated by INRENA.

Don Julio was 44 years old.
