= Flen flyys =

Poem containing oldest known usage of 'fuck'

Flen flyys (Middle English: "Fleas (and) flies") is the colloquial name and first words of an anonymous, untitled poem, written about 1475 or earlier, famous for containing an early written usage in English of the vulgar verb "fuck". In fact the usage was "fuccant", a hybrid of an English root with a Latin conjugation, and was disguised in the text by a simple code, in which each letter was replaced with the next letter in the alphabet of the time (so that fuccant is written as gxddbou).

Written half in English and half in Latin, the poem satirised Carmelite friars in the English county of Cambridgeshire. The poem takes its name from the opening line Flen, flyys and freris meaning "fleas, flies and friars".

The famous line reads "Non sunt in coeli, quia gxddbov xxkxzt pg ifmk." meaning "They [the friars] are not in heaven, since ..." followed by words that when decoded, taking in account the alphabet of the time (where u and v were interchangeable, as were i and j, and uu represented w), read "fvccant vvivys of heli", a Latin/English mix that means "...they fuck the wives of Ely" (Ely being a city near Cambridge) as well as being a pun on the word "hell".

The poem also contains the lines "Fratres cum knyvys goth about and txxkxzv nfookt xxzxkt." With the last three words decoded in the same way as "svvivyt mennis vvyvis," it may be translated as "Friars with knives go about and swive (have sex with) men's wives."

The poem is found in British Library, Harley MS 3362, and was first edited in T. Wright & J. O. Halliwell, Reliquiæ Antiquæ (1841) 1.91. The Oxford English Dictionary (online edition) cites Flen flyys in square brackets, since the form fuccant is Anglo-Latin and not strictly speaking English.
