= Agapito Conchu =

- Born: 1895
- Occupation: Director

Agapito Conchu, also known as Agapito Concho (born 1895, date of death unknown) was a Filipino silent film director of the mid-1930s.

He was born in 1895 and made his directorial debut in the silent movie film Ang Magpapawid (The Roofmaker).

After the "talkies" came to the Philippines, he directed Mahiwagang Biyolin (The Magical Violin), which is a semi-fantasy movie together with a new face, Manuel Conde, who would become a great actor.

Conchu made one horror-flick, Sumpa ng Aswang (Curse of the Devil) with Monang Carvajal and a nationalistic film, Hagase Tu Voluntad.

He specialized in directing dramas, from his first movie Hatol ng Langit (Judged of Heaven) to Awit ng Pag-ibig (The Song of Love), Buhok ni Ester (The Hair of Ester) and Ama (Father) which was his last movie.

== Filmography ==
- 1932 – Ang Magpapawid
- 1935 - Mahiwagang Biyolin
- 1935 - Hatol ng Langit
- 1935 - Awit ng Pag-ibig
- 1935 - Sumpa ng Aswang
- 1936 - Buhok ni Ester
- 1936 - Hagase Tu Voluntad
- 1936 - Ama
