= List of Filipino inventions and discoveries =

This article discusses Filipino inventions and discoveries and details the indigenous arts and techniques, cultural inventions, scientific discoveries and contributions of the people of Philippine islands — both ancient and modern state of the Philippines.

Since ancient times, the people of the Philippine archipelago (Filipino or Pinoy) have accumulated knowledge and developed technology stemming from necessities: from naval navigation knowledge, traditional shipbuilding technology, textile techniques and food processing to Architecture, indigenous arts and techniques, cultural inventions and scientific discoveries.

== Fashion ==
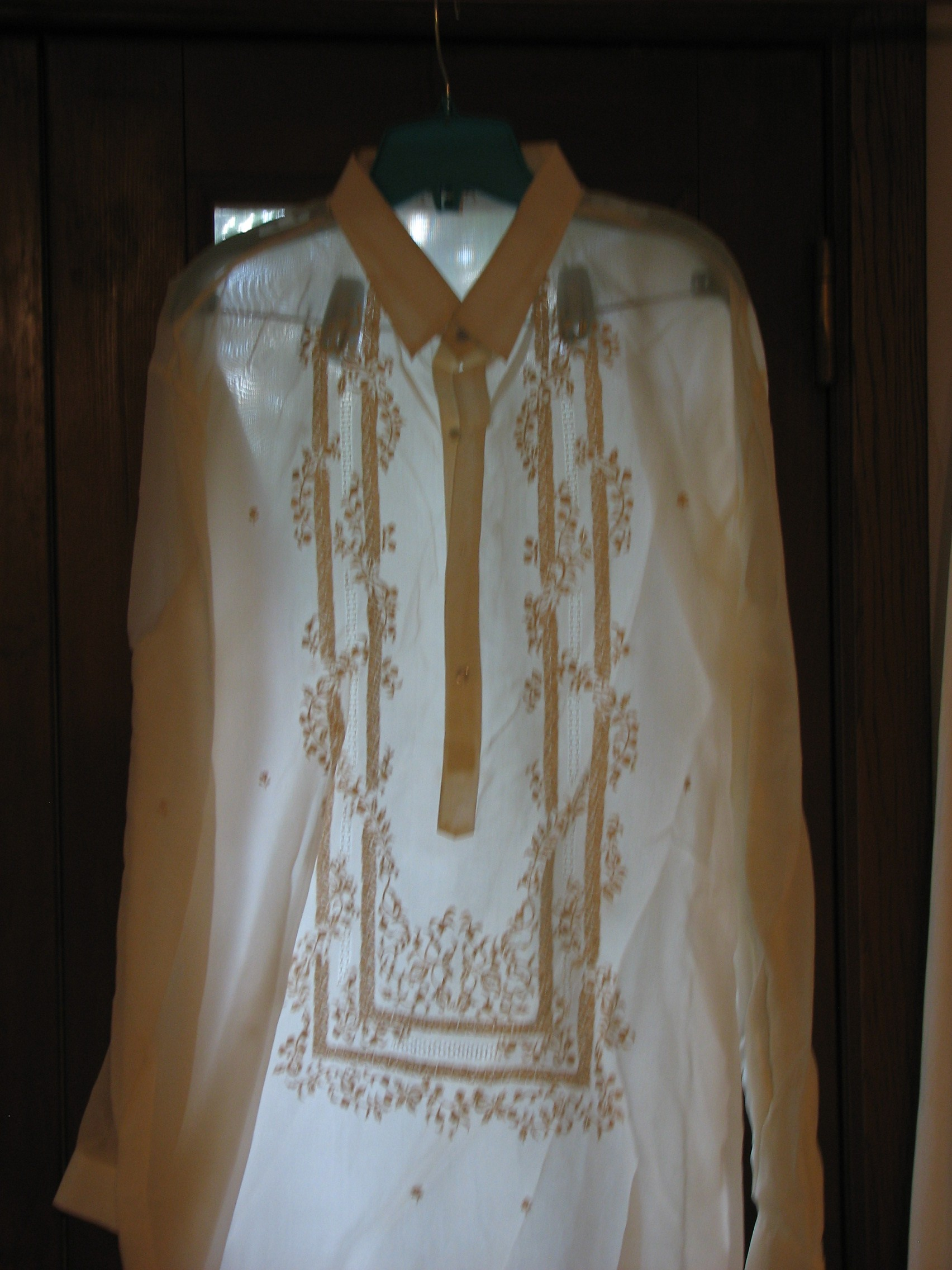
A barong tagalog placed against the light, showing the translucency of the fabric

- The barong tagalog (occasionally baro) is an embroidered formal garment of the Philippines. The name literally means "a Tagalog dress." It is lightweight and worn untucked over an undershirt, similar to a coat/dress shirt. It is usually worn by men during weddings, banquets, and other such formal events. Women wearing the barong tagalog is uncommon, but not unheard of. The baro was popularized as formal wear by Philippine president Ramon Magsaysay, who wore it to most official and personal affairs, including his inauguration as president.
- The baro't saya (also known as Filipiniana) is an embroidered dress and is worn by women. The name is a contraction of the Tagalog words barò at saya, meaning "dress (blouse) and skirt".
- The bahag is a loincloth that was commonly used throughout the Philippines before European colonization, and which is used by some indigenous tribes of the Philippines today—most notably the Cordillerans in Northern Luzon.
- The Salakot is traditional headgear, usually made of bamboo, rattan, nito ferns, and bottle gourd.

== Literature and arts ==
- The Hudhud consists of narrative chants, mainly performed by elder Ifugao women during the rice sowing season, at harvesting times, at funeral wakes and rituals.
- Pabása is a Catholic devotion in the Philippines popular during Holy Week involving the uninterrupted chanting of the Pasyón - an early 16th-century epic poem narrating the life, passion, death, and resurrection of Jesus Christ. The verses are based on the bible and practiced every Holy Week.

== Weapons ==
=== Swords and bladed weapons ===
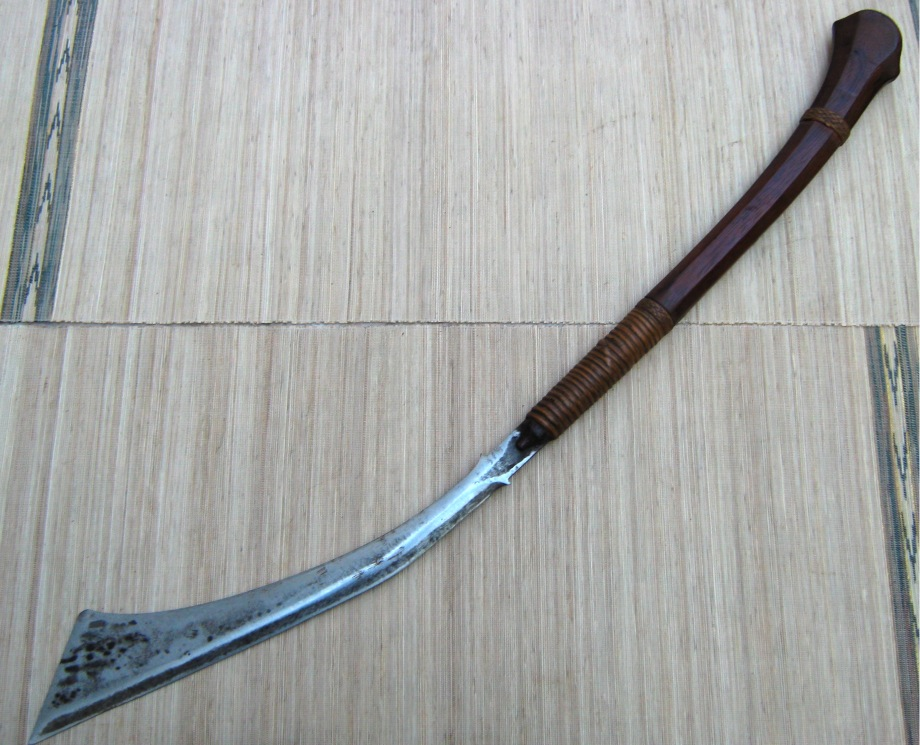
Panabas is a curved-blade weapon.

- The panabas is a large, forward-curved sword, used by certain ethnic groups in the southern Philippines. Its name is a shortened version of the word pang-tabas, which means "chopping tool." Its length varies from two to four feet, and can be wielded with one or both hands. It was used as a combat weapon, as an execution tool, and in displays of power. Its use as an agricultural and butchering tool has also been noted.

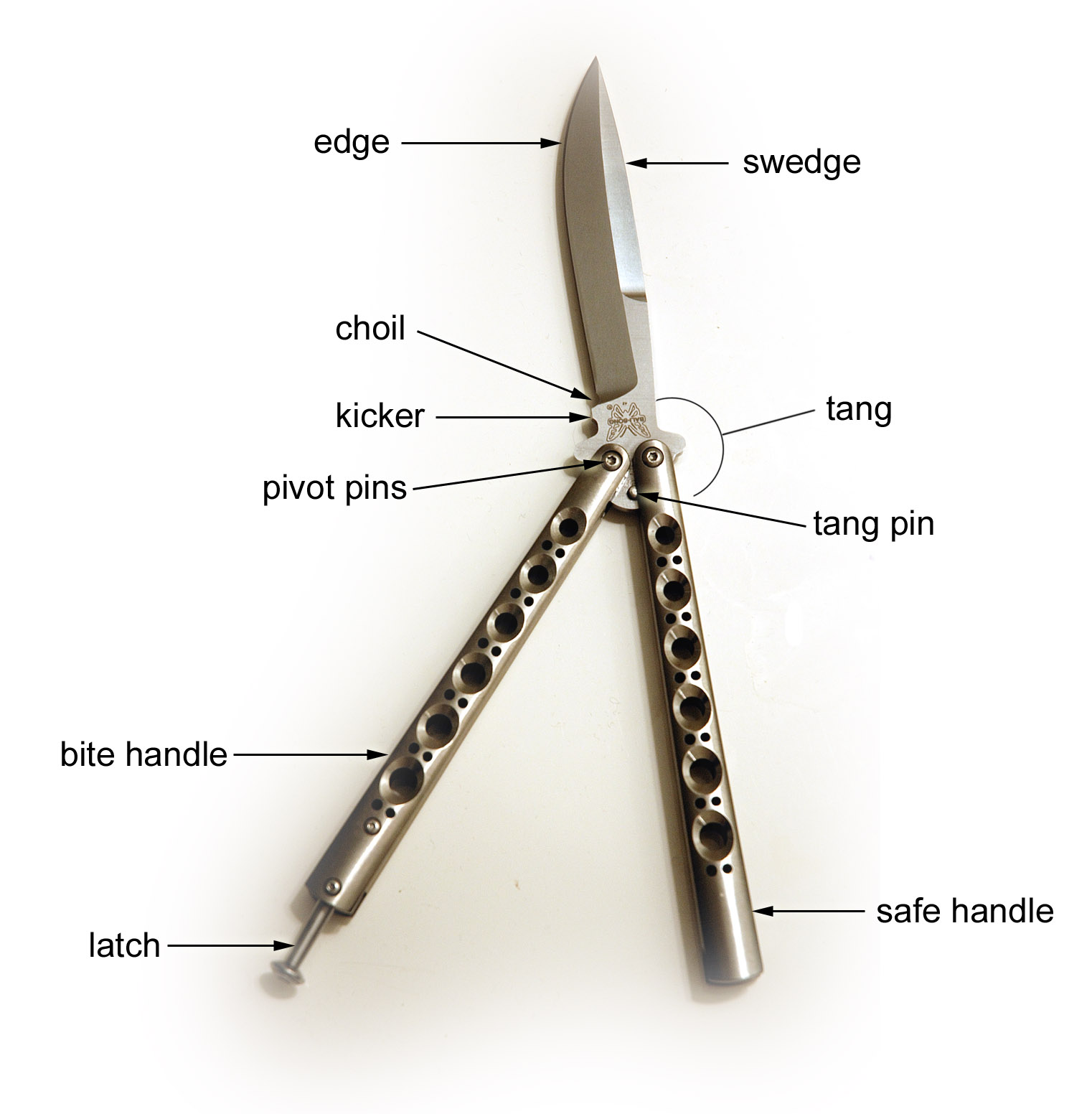
Balisong

- The balisong (also known as a butterfly knife, fan knife or Batangas knife) is a folding pocket knife with two handles counter-rotating around the tang such that, when closed, the blade is concealed within grooves in the handles.
- The barong or barung, is a short sword with a leaf-shaped blade, widely used in the island of Mindanao.
- The kalis is a double-edged sword, often with a "wavy" section, similar to a keris. Like the keris, the kalis' double-edged blade can be used for both cutting and thrusting. The wavy portion of the kalis is meant to facilitate easier slashing in battle—since a straight edge tends to get stuck in the opponent's bones, the wavy portion allows a wielder to more easily pull the weapon out of an opponent's body.
- The gunong or punyál (also known as puñal de kris or kris knife) is a knife from Mindanao. It is essentially a diminutive form of the kalis or kris. The gunong serves both as a utility knife and as a thrusting weapon used for close quarter fighting. It is most often associated with the ethnic Maranao, among whom the gunong was traditionally carried by both sexes. The weapon is typically tucked into the back of a waist sash.

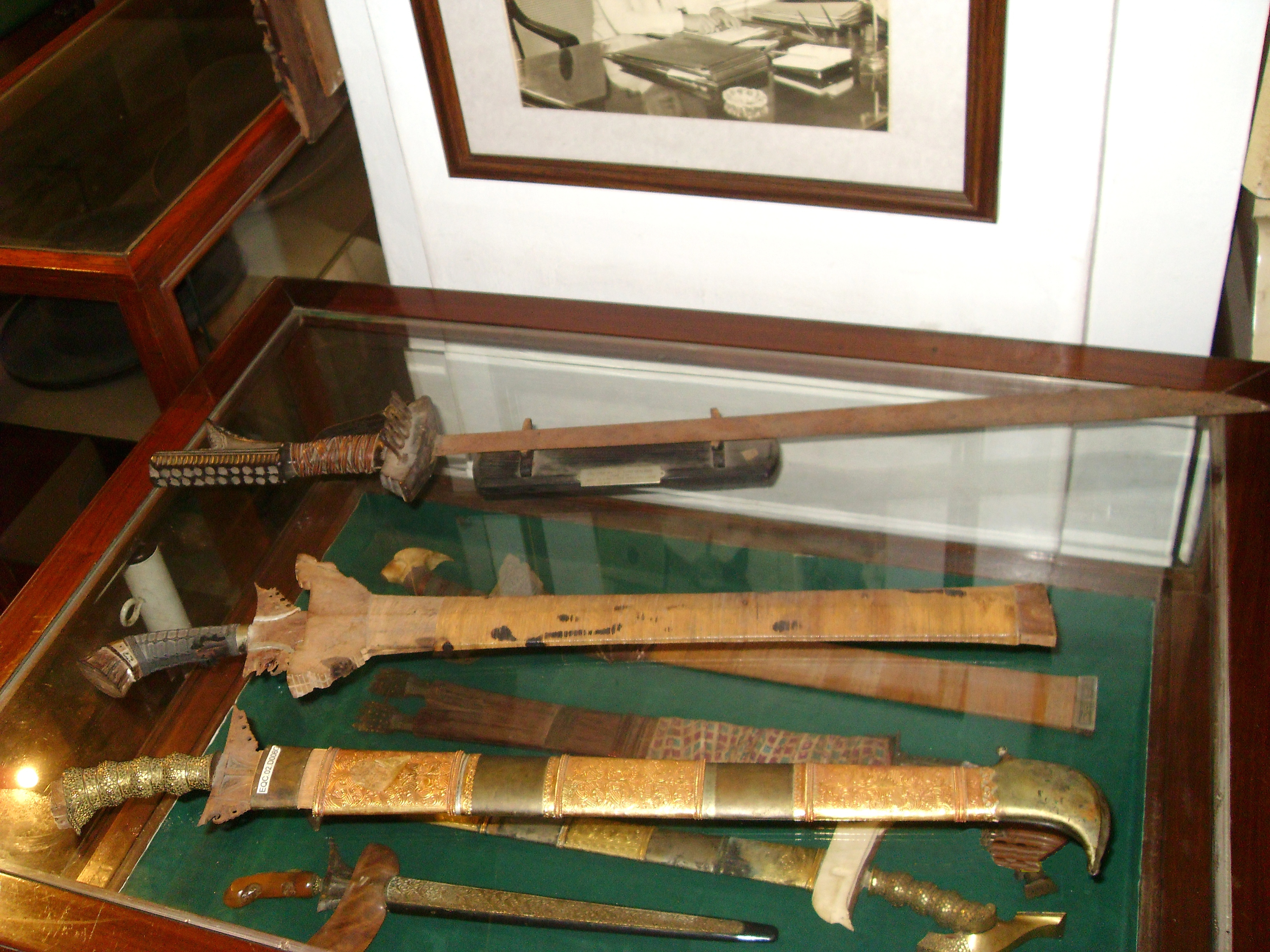
A kampilan hilt is sometimes wrapped with rattan to improve the grip. The two holes on the crossguard are where the metal "staples" (C- or U-shaped) go, as additional protection for the wielder's hand.

- The kampilan is a type of single-edged long sword, used on the islands of Mindanao, Visayas, and Luzon. The kampilan has a distinct profile, with the tapered blade being much broader and thinner at the point than at its base, sometimes with a protruding spikelet along the flat side of the tip and a bifurcated hilt which is believed to represent a mythical creature's open mouth. Lapulapu (the king of Mactan) and his warriors were notable wielders of the kampilan. The mention of the kampilan in ancient Filipino epics originating from non-Muslim areas such as the Hiligaynon Hinilawod and the Ilocano Biag ni Lam-Ang is possible evidence for the sword's widespread usage throughout the archipelago during pre-Hispanic times.

=== Firearms/projectile weapons ===
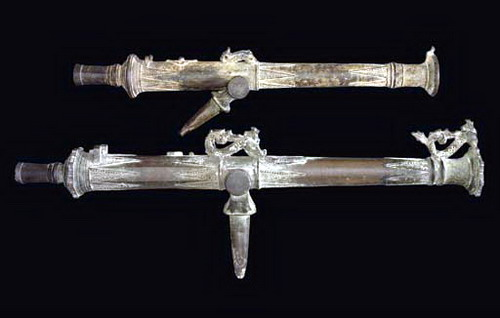
Two lantakas

- The lantaka (also known as kanyon in Tagalog) were a type of bronze swivel gun mounted on merchant vessels travelling the waterways of Malay Archipelago. Its use was greatest in precolonial South East Asia especially in Malaysia, the Philippines, and Indonesia. The guns were used to defend against pirates demanding tribute for the local chief, or potentate. Although most lantaka weighed under two hundred pounds, and many only a few pounds, the largest ones exceeded a thousand pounds, and some weighed over a ton. Many of these guns were mounted on swivels and were known as swivel guns. The smaller ones could be mounted almost anywhere including in the rigging. Medium-sized cannon were frequently used in reinforced sockets on the vessel's rails and were sometimes referred to as rail guns. The heaviest swivel guns were mounted on modified gun carriages to make them more portable. High quality metal casting, artillery, and other metal works had been traditions throughout the ancient Philippines. The metal smith, or panday piray of Pampanga was skilled at making weapons, and many individuals with the surnames Viray and Piray are said to be descendants of people who were once members of the guild of smiths who followed the tradition of the panday pira. Ancient peoples used small arquebuses, or portable cannons made up of bronze. Larger cannons, on the other hand, were made of iron and resembling culverins provided heavier firepower. The iron cannon at Rajah Sulaiman III's house was about 17 feet long and was made from clay and wax moulds.

== Construction and civil engineering ==
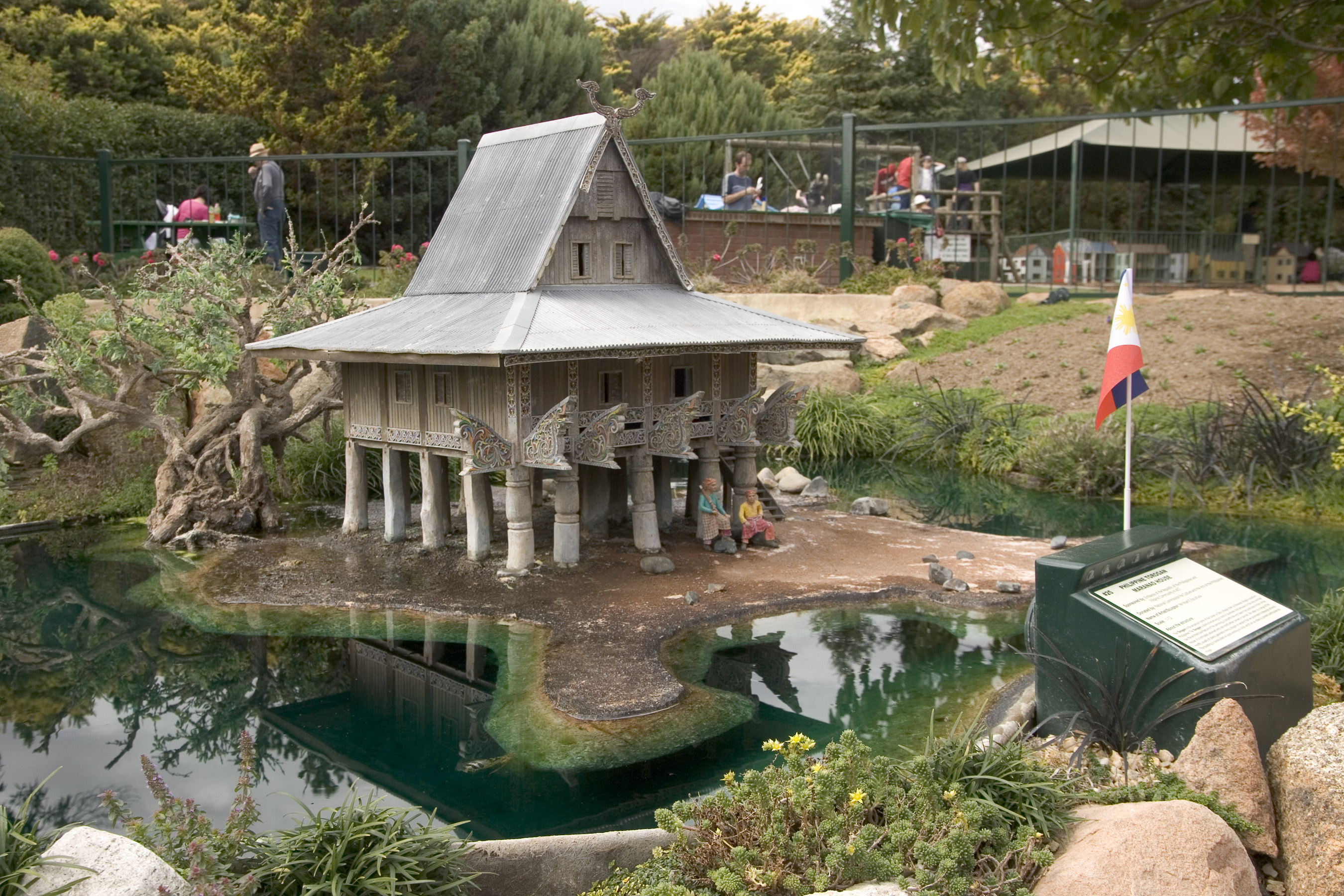
A model of a Torogan

- Igorots built forts made of stone walls that averaged several meters in width and about two to three times the width in height around 2000 BC.
- The Idjang is triangular hil-to citadel of the Ivatan people of the northern islands of Batanes, these idjangs are built fortifications to protect themselves during times of war. They built their so-called idjangs on hills and elevated areas. These fortifications were likened to European castles because of their purpose. Usually, the only entrance to the castles would be via a rope ladder that would only be lowered for the villagers and could be kept away when invaders arrived.
- Torogan is a traditional ancestral house built by the Maranao people of Lanao, Mindanao, Philippines for the nobility, serving as a home to a sultan or datu in the Maranao community. They are massive structures built entirely without using nails - instead using fitted joints and fiber lashings - and are elevated from the ground on large wooden columns. They are usually the biggest structure in a village. A torogan was a symbol of high social status.

== Music and instruments ==
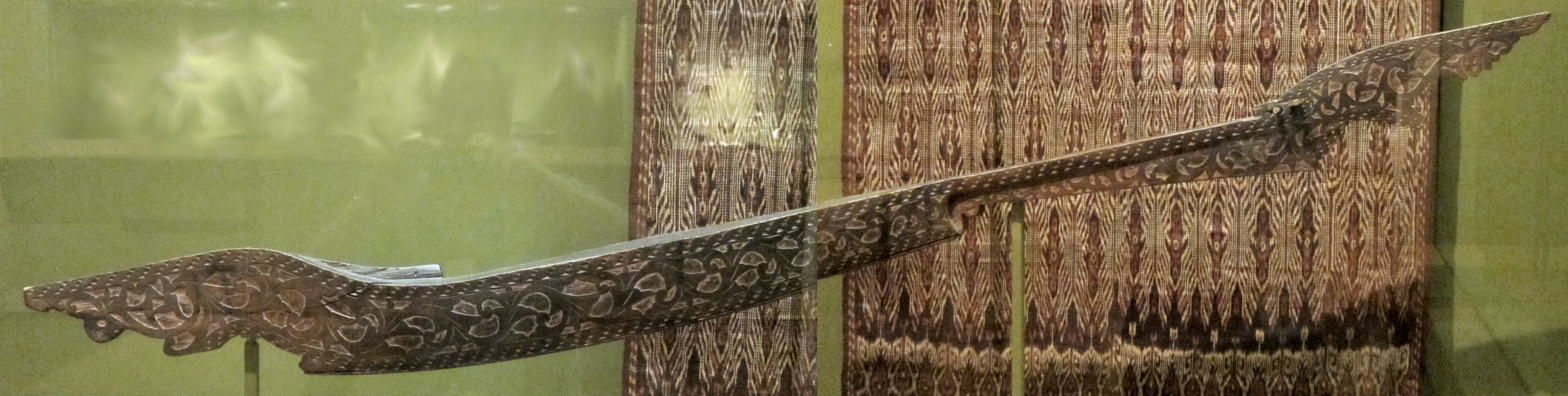
A lute or Kutiyapi from Mindanao bearing Ukkil motifs

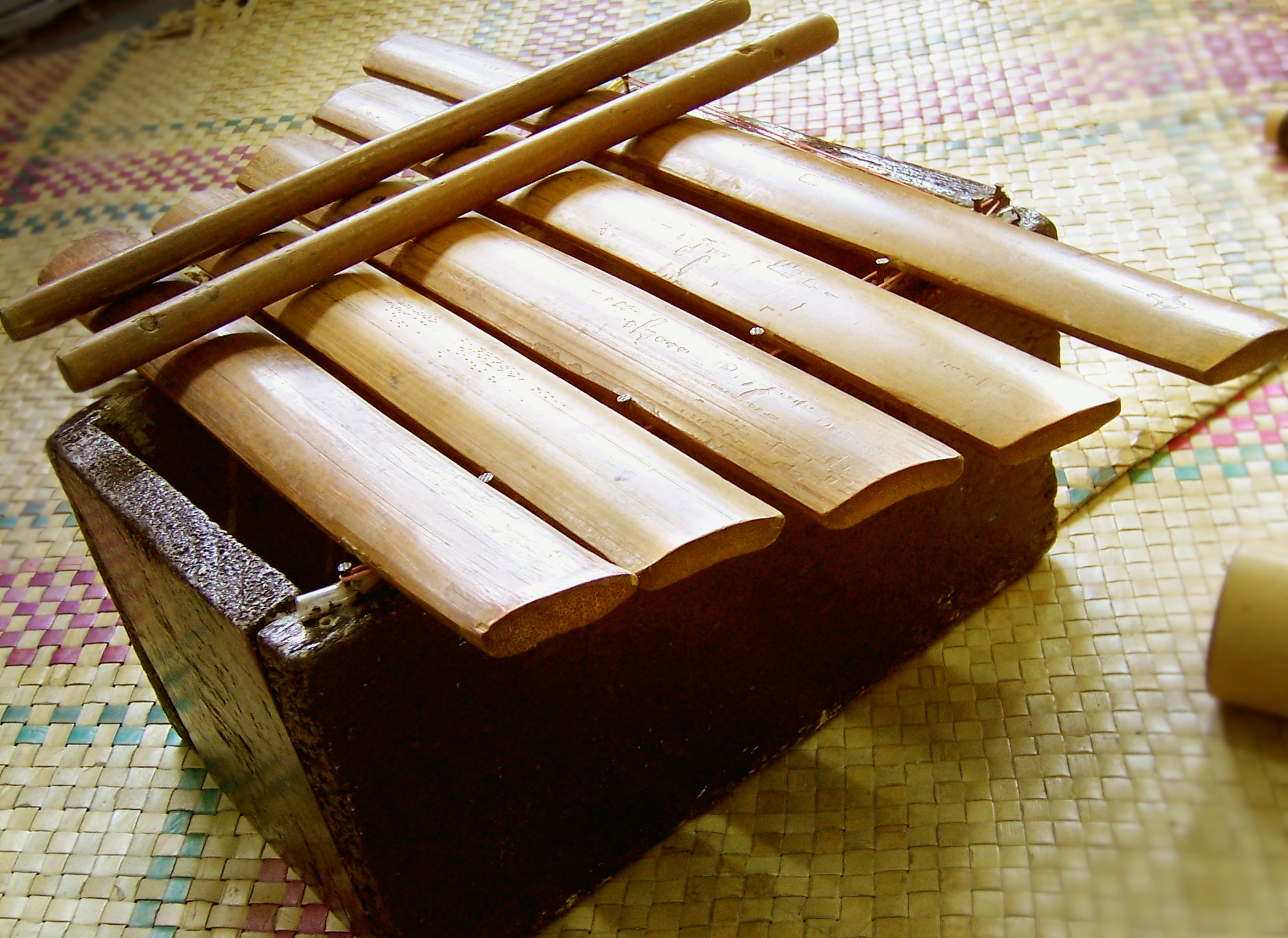
A five-key bamboo version regularly used in performances by Kontra-Gapi, a modern ethnic music ensemble from the Philippines

- OPM include musical performance arts in the Philippines or by Filipinos composed in various genres and styles. The compositions are often a mixture of different Asian, Spanish, Latin American, American, and indigenous influences.
- The Kudyapi is a Philippine two-stringed, fretted boat-lute. It is the only stringed instrument among the people of Visayas and Mindanao, and one of several among other groups such as the Maranao and Manobo. It is four to six feet long with nine frets made of hardened beeswax. The instrument is carved out of solid soft wood such as that from the jackfruit tree. The kudyapi has been found among groups such as the Visayans whose prevalence just like the kubing and other musical instruments are and/or were found in other parts of the Philippines.
- Palendag, also called Pulalu (Manobo and Mansaka), Palandag (Bagobo), Pulala (Bukidnon) and Lumundeg (Banuwaen) is a type of Philippine bamboo flute, the largest one used by the Maguindanao. A smaller version of this instrument is called the Hulakteb (Bukidnon). A lip-valley flute, it is considered the toughest of the three bamboo flutes (the others being the tumpong and the suling) to use because of the way one must shape one's lips against its tip to make a sound. The construction of the mouthpiece is such that the lower end is cut diagonally to accommodate the lower lip and the second diagonal cut is make for the blowing edge. Among the Bukidnon, a similar instrument with the same construction except that it is three-fourths the length of the palendag, is called the hulakteb.
- Gambang, properly called a gambang kayu ('wooden gambang') is a xylophone-like instrument used among peoples of Indonesia and the southern Philippines in gamelan and kulintang, with wooden bars as opposed to the metallic ones of the more typical metallophones in a gamelan. A largely obsolete instrument, the gambang gangsa, is a similar instrument made with metal bars.
- Gandingan is a Philippine set of four large, hanging gongs used by the Maguindanao as part of their kulintang ensemble. When integrated into the ensemble, it functions as a secondary melodic instrument after the main melodic instrument, the kulintang. When played solo, the gandingan allows fellow Maguindanao to communicate with each other, allowing them to send messages or warnings via long distances. This ability to imitate tones of the Maguindanao language using this instrument has given the gandingan connotation: the “talking gongs.”

== Transportation and mobility ==
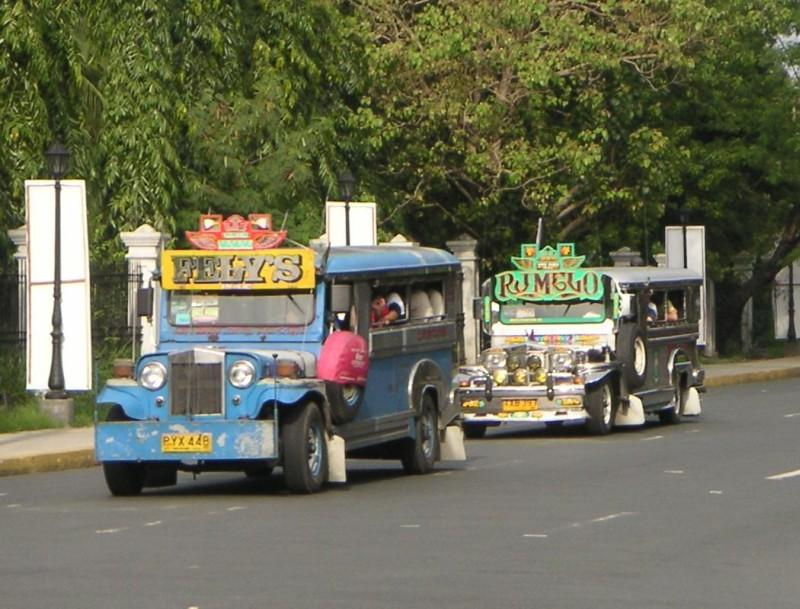
Jeepneys around Manila

=== Marine vessels ===
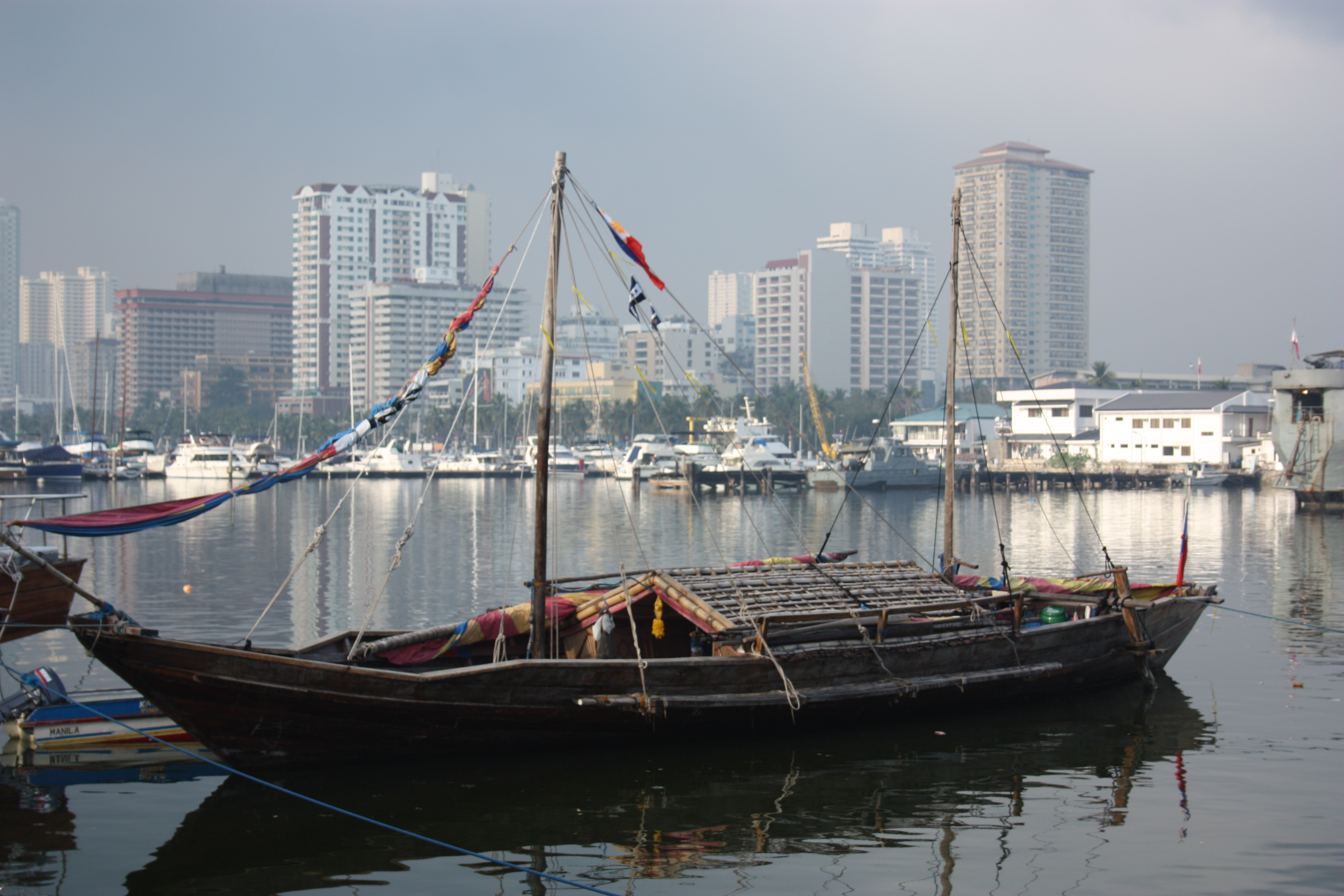
The balangay replica docked at CCP Harbor Manila after its South East Asian expedition

- The balangay was the first wooden marine vessel ever excavated in Southeast Asia. It is also known as the Butuan boat, as nine specimens of these boats, dating back to pre-Hispanic times (the earliest being in 320 CE), were discovered in 1976, Butuan, Mindanao. It is believed that the Austronesians migrated to the Philippine archipelago, riding the balangay. When the first Spaniards arrived in the 16th century, they found the Filipinos living in well-organized independent villages called "baranggáy". The name barangay originated from balangay, the Austronesian word for "sailboat".
- The Karakoa was an ancient warship in the Philippines by the Visayan and Kapampangan people built out of plank fastened with stakes, fitted with accoutrements necessary for searading (mangayaw), slaves and occasional bride. Pedro Chirino, a Spanish friar and a historian, said on his book Relacion de las Islas Filipinas that Karakoa was three times faster than a Spanish Galleon, in the book detailed how friar Francisco Alcina a keen shipwright admired the efficiency of the vessels crafted by the native Visayans, There were 2,000 Kapampangan belligerents in the Battle of Bangkusay who boarded on 40 Karakoas.
- The vinta (locally known as lepa-lepa or sakayan) is a traditional boat, made by ethnic Bajau and Tausūg, living in Mindanao, the Sulu archipelago, North Kalimantan (Indonesia), and Sabah (Malaysia). These boats, sporting a single, colorful sail, are used for inter-island transport of people and goods. Zamboanga City is known for these vessels.

=== Land transport ===
- The Jeepney, a modified military jeep, is the most common form of transportation in the country today. After independence from the United States was declared in 1946, there was a surplus of American military jeeps in the country. Filipinos then modified these vehicles to serve as makeshift buses. Since then, this ubiquitous vehicle has faced a lot of innovative transformations until the modern “E-Jeepney” was finally introduced in Metro Manila and Bacolod.

== Food techniques ==
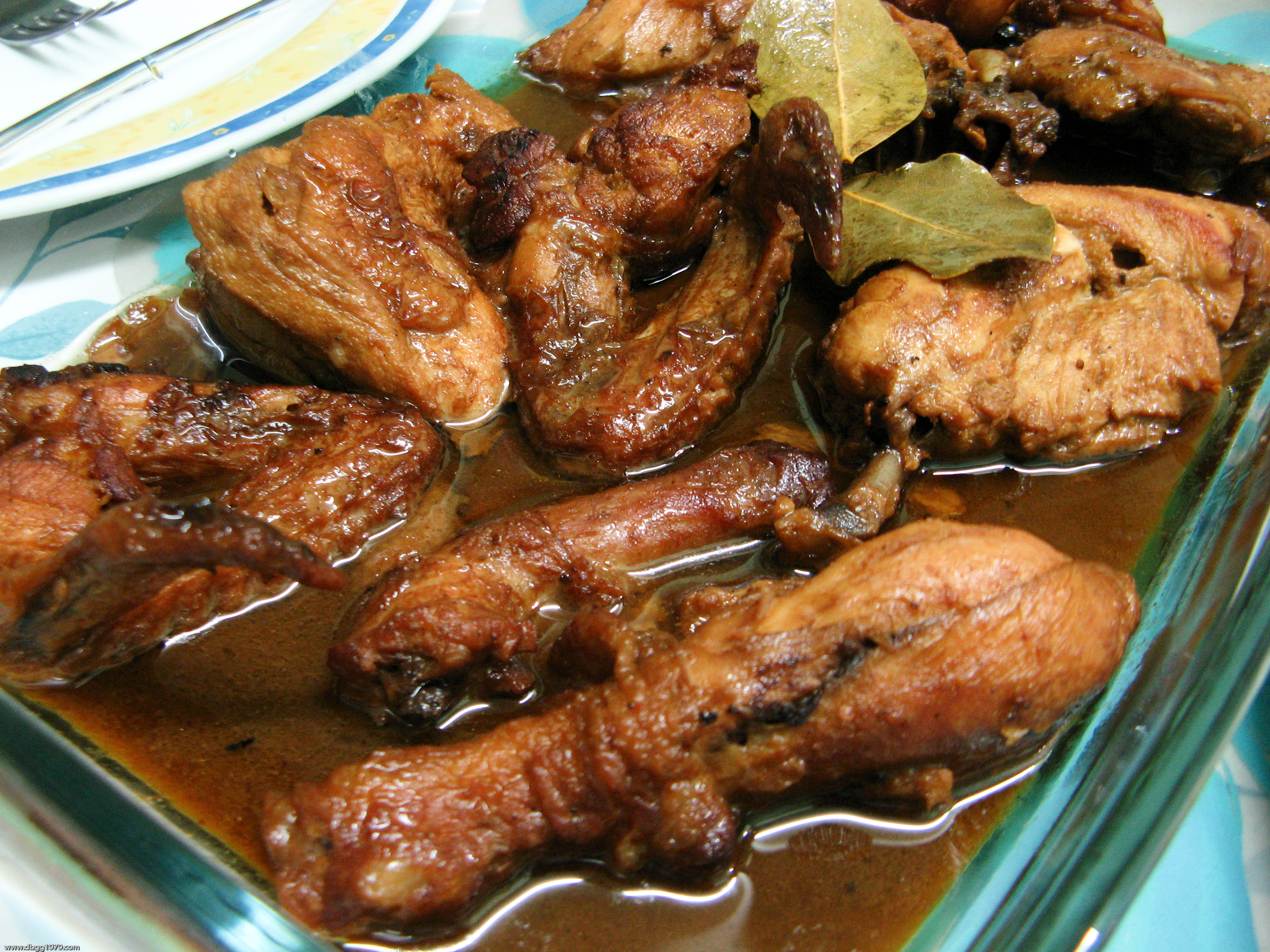
Chicken adobo

- Adobo (meaning "marinade," "sauce" or "seasoning") is a popular dish and cooking process in Philippine cuisine. In its base form, meat, seafood, or vegetables are first browned in oil, and then marinated and simmered in vinegar, salt and/or soy sauce, and garlic. The cooking method is indigenous to the Philippines, despite its Spanish naming. Dishes prepared in this manner eventually came to be known by this name, with the original term for the dish now lost to history.

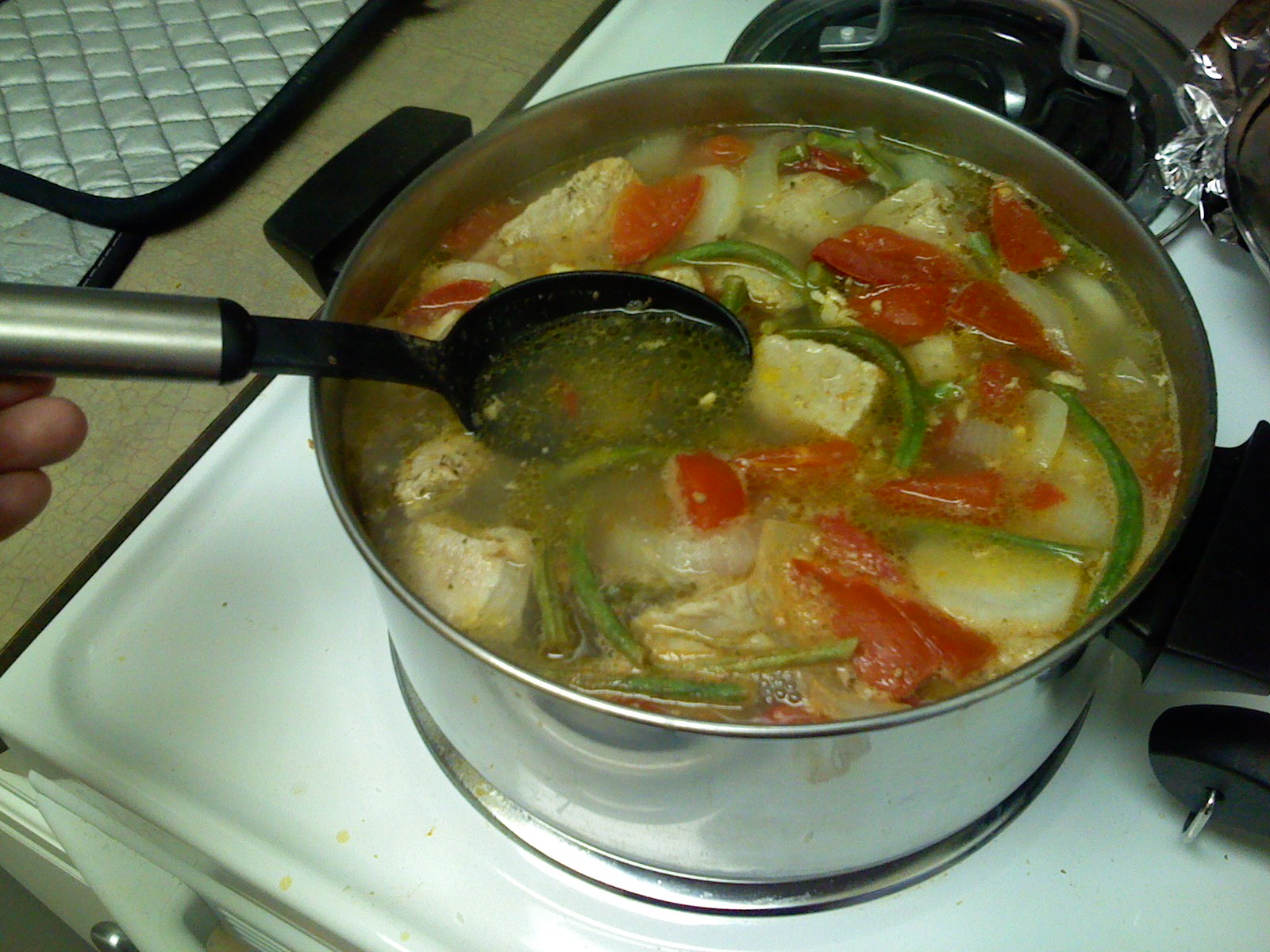
Sinigang

- Sinigang is a Filipino soup or stew characterized by its sour and savory flavor most often associated with tamarind (sampalok). It is one of the popular dishes in Philippine cuisine.
- Banana catsup is a Philippine fruit ketchup condiment made from banana, sugar, vinegar, and spices. Maria Orosa y Ylagan is credited with inventing it. Orosa also experimented with foods native to the Philippines and formulated food products like calamansi nip, a desiccated and powdered form of calamansi that could be used to make calamansi juice, and a powdered preparation of soya-beans called Soyalac, a "magic food" preparation which helped save the lives of thousands of Filipinos, Americans, and other nationals who were held prisoner in different Japanese concentration camps.

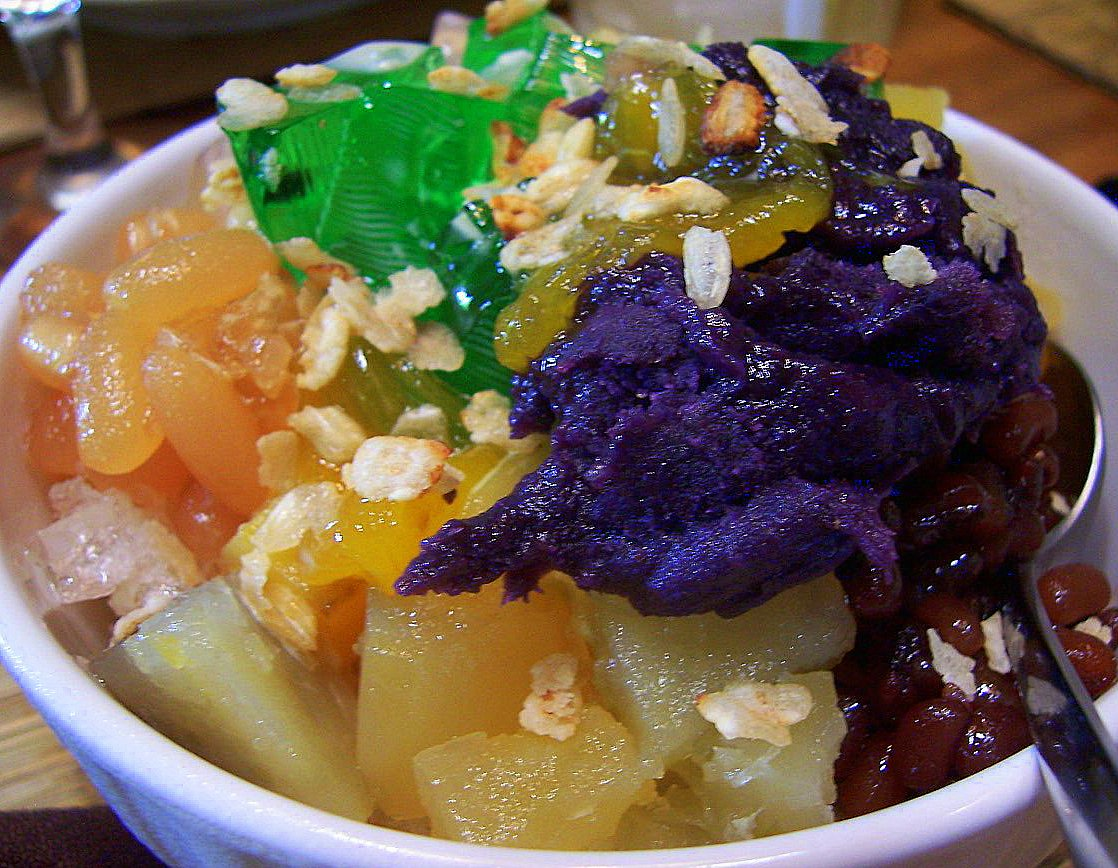
a bowl of Halo-halo.

- Halo-halo (Tagalog: [haluˈhaloʔ], "mixed together") is a popular Filipino dessert with mixtures of shaved ice and evaporated milk to which are added various ingredients, including boiled sweet beans, coconut, sago, gulaman (agar jelly), tubers and fruits. There are claims that halo-halo is derived from Japanese kakigori class of desserts from Japan brought by Japanese immigrants in the 1920s and 1930s. It is served in a tall glass or bowl. The similar Visayan dessert binignit is also referred to as ginataang halo-halo in Tagalog ("halo-halo in coconut milk"), commonly shortened to ginataan. It is made with mostly the same ingredients, although the latter is usually served hot.

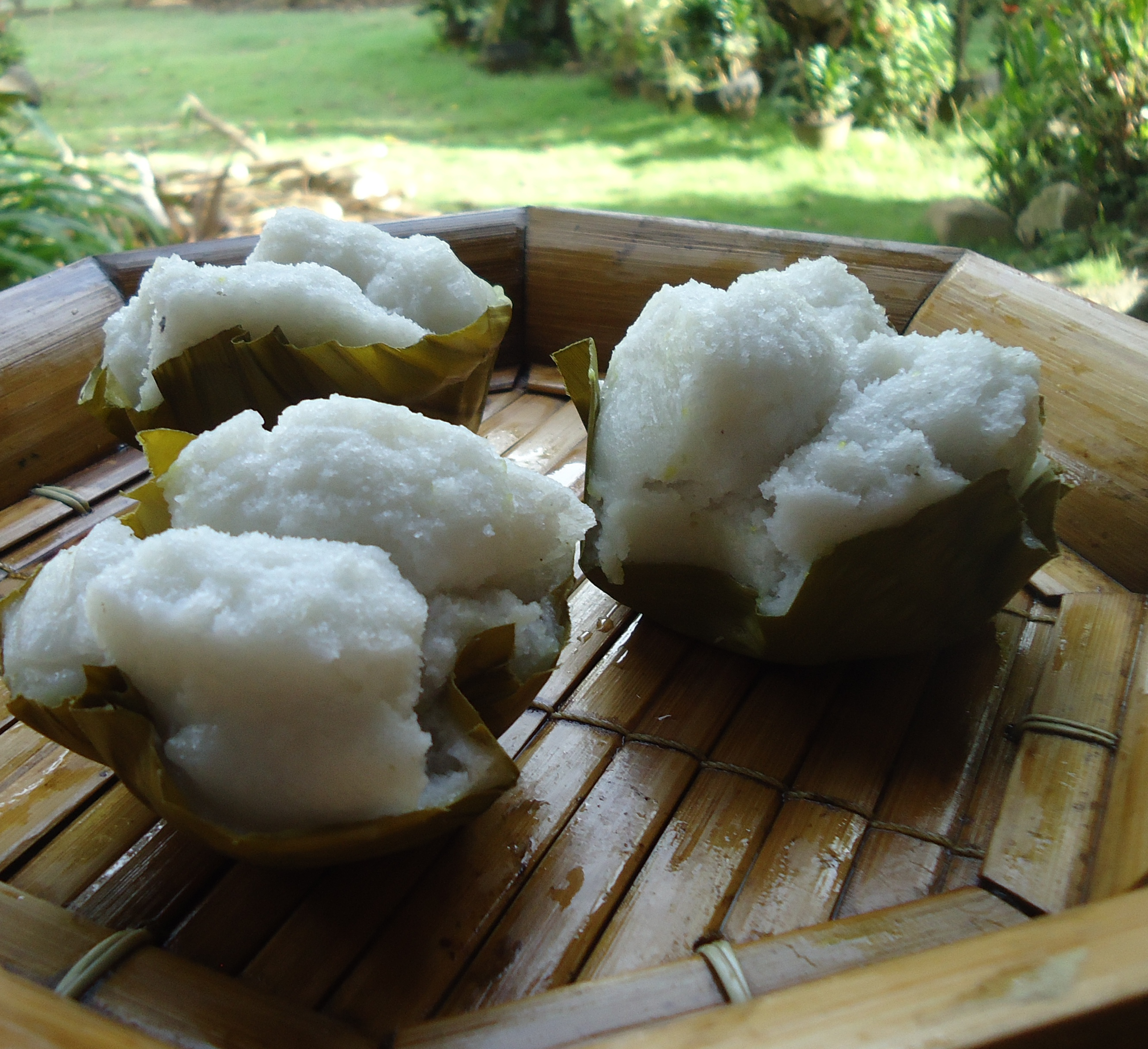
Puto wrapped in a banana leaf.

- Palitaw (from litaw, the Tagalog word for "float" or "rise") is a small, flat, sweet rice cake eaten in the Philippines. They are made from washed, soaked, and ground malagkit (sticky rice). After excess water is let out from the grinding process, scoops of the batter are rolled and flattened to a circular shape and cooked by dropping into boiling water; floating to the surface is an indication that they're done. Before serving, they are dipped in grated coconut, and presented with a separate mix of sugar and toasted sesame seeds.
- Otap (sometimes spelled utap) is an oval-shaped puff pastry in the Philippines, especially common in Cebu where it originated. It usually consists of a combination of flour, shortening, coconut, and sugar. In order to achieve the texture of the pastry, it must undergo an eleven-stage baking process.
- Bibingka is a type of rice cake from the Philippines usually eaten during the Christmas season. It is traditionally cooked in clay pots lined with banana leaves. Bibingka is also used as a general term for desserts made with flour and baked in the same manner. The term can be loosely translated to "[rice] cake".
- Puto is a type of steamed rice cake usually served as snack or as accompaniment to savory dishes such as dinuguan or pancit in Philippine cuisine and believed is to be derived from the Kerala dish puttu. It is eaten as is or with cheese and/or grated fresh coconut, or as an accompaniment to a number of savoury viands (most notably, dinuguan). The most common shape of the putuhán or steamer used in making puto is round, rangingfrom 30 to 60 centimetres (12 to 24 in) in diameter and between 2 and 5 centimetres (0.79 and 1.97 in) deep. These steamers are rings made of either soldered sheet metal built around a perforated pan, or of thin strips of bent bamboo enclosing a flat basket of split bamboo slats (similar to a dim sum steamer basket). The cover is almost always conical to allow the condensing steam to drip along the perimeter instead of on the cakes.

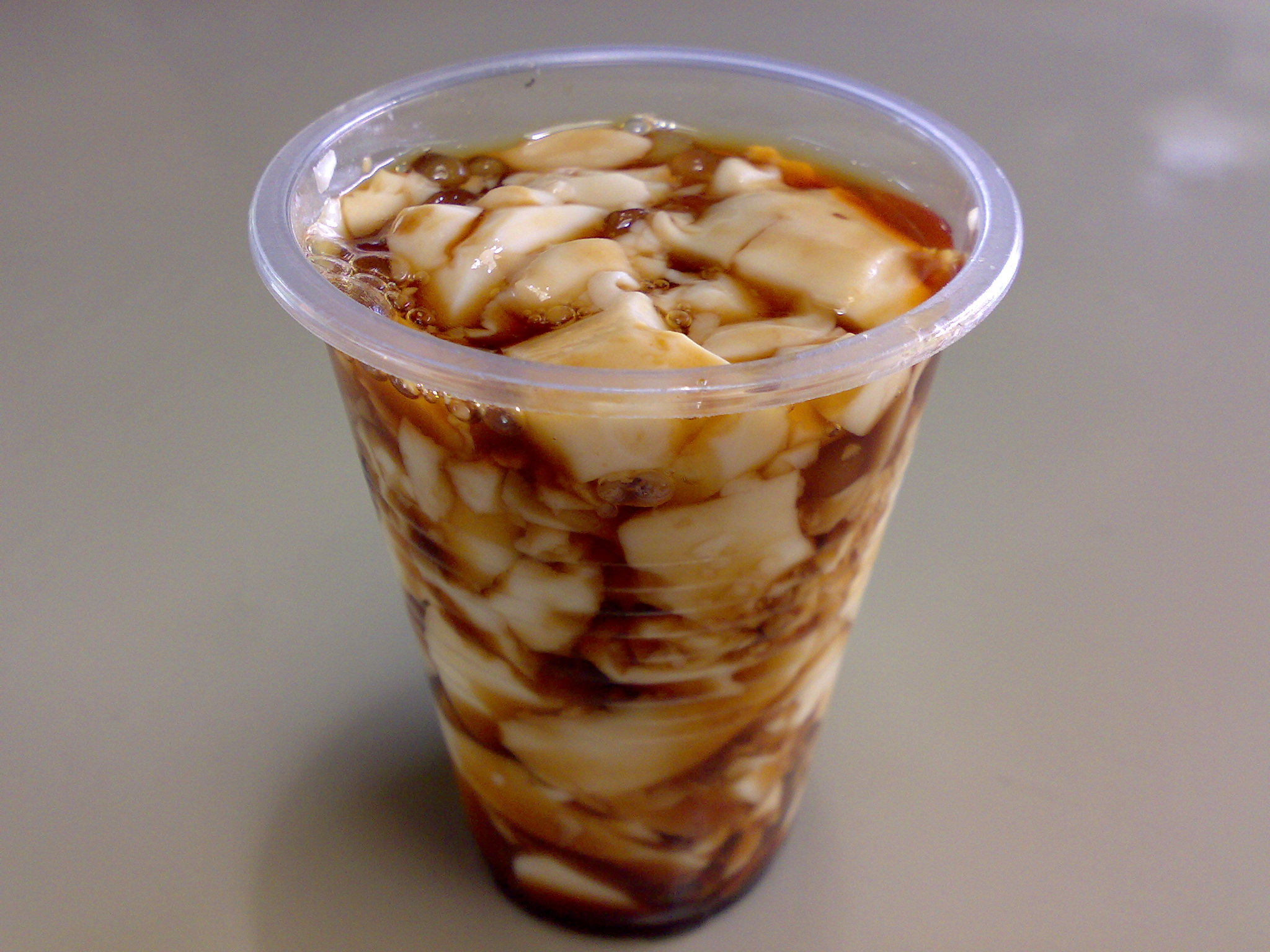
A cup of Taho

- Kutsinta is a type of steamed rice cake (puto) found throughout the Philippines. It is made from a mixture of rice flour, brown sugar and lye, enhanced with yellow food coloring or annatto extract, and steamed in small ramekins. The cooked cakes are topped with fresh grated meat from mature coconut. It is consumed year-round as a merienda or snack, and is frequently sold along with puto. Unlike its counterpart, which has a doughy texture, kutsina has a jelly-like, chewy consistency. It can be also enhanced by adding latik for a sweeter taste.
- Taho is a Filipino snack food made of fresh soft/silken tofu, arnibal (sweetener and flavoring), and sago pearl (similar to tapioca pearls). This staple comfort food is a signature sweet and taho peddlers can be found all over the country. The Indonesian equivalent of this snack is Tauhue, and the Malaysian equivalent of this snack is called Taufufah.
- Nata de coco was originally invented in 1949 by Teodula K. Kalaw as an alternative to the traditional Filipino nata de piña which is made from pineapples.
- Macapuno was first cultivated commercially in the Philippines after the development of the "embryo rescue" in vitro culture technology in the 1960s by Emerita V. De Guzman.

== Modern technologies ==
- Rescue 72, a combination life vest and survival kit, invented by Danvic Briones. This device allows the user to store survival supplies (food, water, medications, etc.) into watertight compartments within the life vest, allowing the wearer to survive up to 72 hours, the period of time it might take rescuers to reach remote locations after a disaster.
- Diosdado Banatao developed the first single-chip graphical user interface (GUI) accelerator that made computers work much faster. This invention has allowed computer users to use graphics for commands and not the usual typed commands in older computers. It has allowed data processing to be a little faster using very little space, with small chips instead of large boards. He was credited with having developed the first 10-Mbit Ethernet CMOS with silicon coupler data-link control and transreceiver chip, the first system logic chip set for IBM's PC-XT and the PC-AT, and the local bus concept and the first Windows Graphics accelerator chip for personal computers. As a three-time start-up veteran, he co-founded Mostron, Chips and Technologies, and S3 Graphics. Sitting together on analog circuits and DSP (digital signal processing) circuits on the same silicon and make them work together demonstrated the invention of this one-chip video camera in CMOS. Banatao has received numerous awards, has co-authored 13 papers, and held six U.S. patents. He has a Ph.D. degree from Stanford University in mixed-signal CMOS IC design.
- Eco-G NanoTechnology developed the Eco-G3000, a low-cost and low-maintenance fuel-emission reduction device. It is designed to reduce vehicular gas consumption and toxic emission.
- Justino Arboleda devised the coconet, a sturdy but biodegradable net made from coconut husk.
- The Vazbuilt Modular Housing System, an invention of Edgardo Vazquez, is a concept of a prefabricated or ready-to-build housing system. an easy to build and less time to construct Walls, floors, columns, window panels, and tied beams, with additional implementation which can potentially solved the country housing backlog.
- Marc Loinaz invented the One Chip Video Camera, Ho-hum materials from a personal computer was the beginning of one-chip video camera created by the team of Loinaz at Lucent Technologies. It is small, a size of cigarette lighter, low power and cheap and can be integrated into everything from wristwatches to cars. Contrary to CCDs (charge-coupled devices), which are relatively large, consume large power and are complicated to design, this one chip is also based on silicon chip found on microprocessors and memory devices.
- Bobby Murphy, a Filipino-American, co-founded Snap Inc. (formerly Snapchat Inc.), a technology and camera company. The company has 4 main products: Snapchat, Spectacles, Bitmoji, and Zenly.

== Games and sports ==
- Game of the Generals, a military-themed board game invented by Sofronio H. Pasola, Jr. The goal of this game is to capture the opponent's flag, or maneuver one's own flag at the end of the board while evading the opponent's soldiers and spies.
- The spike is a volleyball technique developed by Filipino players in the first half of the 20th century and was known as the "Manila Bomb".

=== Martial arts ===
The Eskrima, Arnis, and Kali are umbrella terms for the traditional martial arts of the Philippines ("Filipino Martial Arts," or FMA) that emphasize weapon-based fighting with sticks, knives and other bladed weapons, and various improvised weapons. It is also known as Estoque (Spanish for rapier), Estocada (Spanish for thrust or stab) and Garrote (Spanish for club). In Luzon they may go by the name of Arnis de Mano, Pananandata (use of weapons), Sinawali (Pampanga, "to weave"), Sitbatan (Pangasinan), Didya and Kabaroan (Ilocos region). In the Visayas and Mindanao, these martial arts have been referred to as Eskrima, Kali, Kaliradman, Pagaradman and Kalirongan. Kuntaw and Silat are separate martial arts that have been practiced in the islands. It also includes hand-to-hand combat, joint locks, grappling, and weapon disarming techniques. Although in general, emphasis is put on weapons for these arts, some systems put empty hands as the primary focus and some old school systems do not teach weapons at all.

For all intents and purposes, Eskrima, Arnis, and Kali all refer to the same family of Filipino weapon-based martial arts and fighting systems.

Eskrima masters along with students in Cebu City

== Discoveries ==
- In the 1940s, a method to formulate erythromycin was discovered by Dr. Abelardo Aguilar. A doctor from Iloilo, Aguilar worked for the pharmaceutical company Eli Lilly and Company as a researcher. Then in 1949, he submitted samples of his work to the company's research team who in 1952 declared the discovery of a new kind of antibiotic. According to the team, the new drug was capable of treating several kinds of infections minus the common side-effects of antibiotics, and could be given to those who were allergic to penicillin.
- In 1966, Rodolfo Aquino isolated nine specific breeds of rice for the International Rice Research Institute. His discoveries helped prevent famine in much of Asia.
- In 2007, Jayme Navarro of Bacolod discovered a method of converting plastic bags into fuel. It starts by melting the plastics and then taking out the polymers to mix with a catalyst. Pyrolysis will occur soon after to produce hydrocarbon gases. After several processes of purification, the final output will then be compressed and stored. On average, 5,000 kilos of plastic bags can produce 400 liters of diesel. The discovery was assessed by the DOE and DOST which both attested that the resulting fuel is lower in sulfur and environment-friendly. The invention was finally patented in November 2008.

== In urban legends ==
There are urban legends in the Philippines purporting supposed inventions by Filipinos. These assertions are presented as facts in some academic textbooks in history and science used by Filipino students, as well as social media, to promote Filipino exceptionalism.

- Fluorescent lamp, said to be invented by a certain Agapito Flores. The name of the invention supposedly comes from the surname of the purported inventor, "Flores", sounding similar to the term fluorescent.
- Yoyo, alleged to have been invented by Filipinos. Some believe that the toy could have been used as a weapon. Nestor Castro of the Department of Anthropology of UP Diliman said that the yoyo was indeed invented as a toy but said that he was uncertain where did the idea of the yoyo as a weapon originated. He pointed out that there are no credible sources stating that the yoyo was invented or not invented by Filipinos.
- ArmaLite M16 rifle was allegedly designed by a Filipino gunsmith Armando Lite (pronounced as LEE-teh).
- Lunar Roving Vehicle used by the Apollo missions 15, 16, 17 was allegedly designed by a certain Filipino NASA engineer by the name of Eduardo San Juan. This has long been proven a hoax, as NASA has declassified its Apollo Mission papers.

== See also ==
- Cultural achievements of pre-colonial Philippines
- National Scientist of the Philippines
- Science and technology in the Philippines
- Web accessibility initiatives in the Philippines
