= Rainstorm Entertainment =

Independent film company

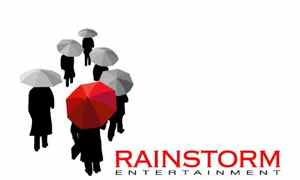
- Rainstorm Entertainment
- Industry: Film
- Founded: 2002
- Founder: Steven G. Kaplan
- Website: http://www.rainstormentertainment.com/

Rainstorm Entertainment is an independent film development, production and sales company headquartered in Hollywood, California.

== History ==
Rainstorm Entertainment was confirmed in November 2003 to produce and finance the documentary film Fuck, with production scheduled to begin in January 2004. The film was completed in 2005 by film director Steve Anderson's film company Mudflap Films; it was executive produced by Rainstorm Entertainment co-founders Steven Kaplan and Gregg Daniel, along with Bruce Leiserowitz, Jory Weitz and Richard Ardi.

== Filmography ==
Year	Film	Director	Notes
2000	Terror Tract	Lance W. Dreesen and Clint Hutchison	Winner, Pegasus Audience Award (Brussels International Festival of Fantasy Film)
2000	Terror Tract	Lance W. Dreesen and Clint Hutchison	Winner, Silver Raven (Brussels International Festival of Fantasy Film)
2000	Terror Tract	Lance W. Dreesen and Clint Hutchison	Winner, Best Feature (Rhode Island International Horror Film Festival)
2000	Terror Tract	Lance W. Dreesen and Clint Hutchison	Winner, Festival Prize (Shriekfest)
2003	The Big Empty	Steve Anderson	Steve Anderson made his directorial debut in 2003 with this film starring Daryl Hannah and Jon Favreau.
2005	Fuck	Steve Anderson	The movie was shown for the first time on November 7, 2005 at the AFI Film Festival. The 2005 AFI Film Festival was held at the ArcLight Hollywood on Sunset Boulevard in Hollywood, California.
2006	Big Bad Wolf	Lance W. Dreesen	Winner, Silver Award, Best Science Fiction/Fantasy/Horror Film, (WorldFest Houston)
2006	Red White Black and Blue	Tom Putnam	Winner, Special Jury Prize, Best Score (BendFilm Festival)
2007	Lost Colony: The Legend of Roanoke (also known as Wraiths of Roanoke)	Matt Codd	Television movie starring actor Adrian Paul
2008	I Am An Island	Jennifer DeLia	Short film
2010	John Henry: A Steel Driving Horse	Cameron Duddy and Chris Koby	Documentary film about a Thoroughbred racehorse.
2011	Billy Bates	Jennifer DeLia	Feature film about a "tormented artist"; made with assistance of Julie Pacino, daughter of actor Al Pacino.
2012	Sunset Strip	Hans Fjellestad	Documentary film about the Sunset Strip in Los Angeles, California; the film was screened at the South by Southwest film festival.
2013	State of Control (also known as Tibet in Ruins)	Christian Johnston and Darren Mann	Documentary film about Tibet; according to The Washington Post, filmmakers had to deal with cyberwarfare against their computers during production.
2013	Its So Easy and Other Lies	Christopher Duddy	Documentary film about biography of Duff McKagan, bass player for music group Guns N' Roses.
2013	Blunt Force	Daniel Zirilli	
