= Race for Glory =

- Directed by: Rocky Lang
- Written by: Rocky Lang
- Produced by: Jon Gordon; Daniel A. Sherkow
- Starring: Alex McArthur; Peter Berg; Pamela Ludwig; Ray Wise; Oliver Stritzel; Barbara Blossom; Steve Carlisle; Jerome Dempsey; Scott J. Fisher
- Cinematography: Jack N. Green
- Edited by: Maryann Brandon
- Music by: Jay Ferguson
- Release date: 3 November 1989
- Running time: 104 min.
- Country: United States
- Language: English

Race for Glory (also known as American Built) is a 1989 American action film directed by Rocky Lang. The film stars Alex McArthur, Peter Berg, Pamela Ludwig, Ray Wise, Oliver Stritzel and Barbara Blossom in the lead roles. The score was composed by Jay Ferguson.

== Plot ==
Dirt track racer Cody Gifford along with his best friend and crew chief Chris Washburn, and girlfriend Jenny Eastman, have built a 500cc superbike in their garage. They take it to the American qualifiers, Despite his bike falling over, he keeps up with two-time German world champion Klaus Kroeter on a factory Samurai, until Gifford and Kroeter crash. After Gifford sets a faster time than Kroeter at the Czechoslovak time trials, the Belgian Grand Prix begins. Kroeter wins as Gifford, who finishes fourth. After this, Gifford accepts an offer to become Kroeter's teammate at Samurai where he is to be a blocker, leaving his friends behind. Kroeter wins race after race as Gifford continues to put up an impressive fight against his teammartw. The Austrian Grand Prix begins. Kroeter takes the lead with Gifford and Italian rider Lalo Giacomo right behind. Kroeter causes Gifford and Giacomo to crash which results in Gifford's bike exploding and Giacomo breaking his leg. Gifford quits and returns home only to find that his father, Joe, has died. Joe's last letter says he wanted Cody to win the Grand Prix. Gifford then reunites with his friends and girlfriend to rebuild the bike. The French Grand Prix then begins. After several bikes overheat, Gifford is in second om the last lap right behind Kroeter Kroeter's engine blows up on the last turn and Gifford wins as Kroter manages to limp across the line in 6th. Gifford is the new champion and he, Cody, Jenny, and their mechanic Fujimoto celebrate.

== Cast ==
- Alex McArthur as Cody Gifford
- Peter Berg as Chris Washburn
- Pamela Ludwig as Jenny Eastman
- Ray Wise as Jack Davis
- Oliver Stritzel as Klaus Kroeter
- Burt Kwouk as Yoshiro Tanaka
- Daniel Lombart as Lalo Giacomo
- Barbara Blossom as Mrs. Eastman
- Steve Carlisle as Mo Turner
- Takashi Kawahara as Fujimoto
- Jerome Dempsey as Ray Crowley
