= Big Bad Wolf (2006 film) =

2006 American horror film written and directed by Lance W. Dreesen

- Film poster
- Directed by: Lance W. Dreesen
- Written by: Lance W. Dreesen
- Produced by: Clinton Hutchison; Steven G. Kaplan; Gregg L. Daniel
- Starring: Trevor Duke; Kimberly J. Brown; Sarah Christine Smith
- Cinematography: Stephen Crawford
- Edited by: J.M. Logan
- Music by: Dana Niu
- Production companies: Rainstorm Entertainment; Bad Apple Films; Red Five Entertainment
- Distributed by: Screen Media
- Release date: October 25, 2006
- Running time: 95 minutes
- Country: United States
- Language: English

Big Bad Wolf is a 2006 American werewolf-themed horror film. It won the 2007 Silver Award at WorldFest Houston in the category of Best Science Fiction/Fantasy/Horror Film. The film starred Trevor Duke as Derek Cowley and Kimberly J. Brown as Samantha Marche. The film was written and directed by Lance W. Dreesen.

== Plot ==
While hunting in the jungle of Cameroon, Scott Cowley and his guide receive radio contact from Scott's brother, Charlie, that his own guide is missing. The call is interrupted by horrific sounds suggesting an animal attack, and the pair set out to help, only to fall prey themselves. Charlie finds Scott fatally wounded.

Seven years later, Charlie's nephew, Derek, lives with his mother Gwen and his emotionally abusive stepfather, Mitch. Derek prepares to take advantage of Mitch's planned work trip to use his cabin for a weekend party with classmates he hopes to impress. That night, the cabin is attacked by a werewolf. The werewolf brutally murders four of the partygoers. Only Derek and his friend Sam manage to escape.

Fearing the truth is too unbelievable, the pair of survivors allege they didn't see the attacker. Mitch picks Derek up from the police station and tells him his actions make him responsible for the massacre. Sam and Derek suspect that Mitch is the werewolf and attempt to piece together proof, as tensions rise in the household.

When Charlie pays a surprise visit, Derek and Sam confide in him and are surprised to find he believes them. Charlie explains that he believed the werewolf in Cameroon to be Mitch, as Mitch had an obsession with Gwen. Charlie cautions the teens that an accusation cannot be made without DNA evidence to compare to a hair sample he kept from the werewolf. Meanwhile, Charlie reconnects with Gwen, and romance is likewise budding between Sam and Derek.

Mitch catches Sam snooping in his room and coerces her into a sexual act, which provides the DNA sample she needs. But when Derek finds out, it puts a strain on his relationship with Sam. Meanwhile, Mitch has been stalking Charlie, suspicious of his relationship with Gwen. He steals a package addressed to Charlie and finds the DNA test results inside. Mitch later abducts Charlie and reveals he can shapeshift at will, without relying on the full moon. Mitch brutally kills Charlie, saying it is his own fault for not minding his business.

Derek later finds the DNA report and steps up to confront Mitch about Charlie's death. Derek's mother also decides to leave Mitch. In retaliation, Mitch kidnaps Sam and demands Derek meet him in the cabin alone.

Derek arrives to find another group of youths eager to explore the site, which is now locally notorious as the scene of a massacre. Mitch transforms and attacks them one by one until only Derek and Sam remain. They fight Mitch with silver weapons and eventually set him on fire, also burning down the cabin in the process. After escaping, Derek and Sam embrace, but Mitch has survived long enough for a final attack on his stepson. As Mitch dies, he tells Derek that the curse is now his. Sam assuages Derek's fears with a promise to stick by him whatever happens, and they drive off together on her moped.

In a post-credits scene, Mitch is shown moving his fingers slightly.

== Cast ==
- Trevor Duke as Derek Cowley
- Kimberly J. Brown as Samantha "Sam" Marche
- Richard Tyson as Mitchell Toblat/The Beast
- Sarah Aldrich as Gwen Cowley
- Christopher Shyer as Charlie Cowley
- Andrew Bowen as Scott Cowley
- Sarah Christine Smith as Cassie
- Robin Sydney as Melissa
- Adam Hendershott as Nick Baxter
- Clint Howard as Fulton Chaney
- Martin Dorsla as Kenge
- Jennifer Roa as Breanna
- Walter Perez as Fisher
- Shannon Malone as Jasmine
- Josh Fadem as Suneel
- David Naughton as Sheriff Ruben
- Teresa Strasser as News Reporter
- Kurt Meyer as Courier
- Matthew Hutchison as Front Desk Clerk
- Mary Ann Dreesen as Park Mom
- Brooke Bateman Hotel Guest
- Marschelle Bateman as Hotel Guest

== Reception ==
Craig Ian Mann wrote in his book, Phases of the Moon: A Cultural History of the Werewolf Film, comparing the film to the 1940s werewolf films stating social and cultural conceptions of gender identity were continuing to develop.

Kim Newman wrote in her book, Nightmare Movies: Horror on Screen Since the 1960s, called the film formulaic.
