= Watching the Detectives (Justified) =

- Justified episode
- Episode no.: Season 3 Episode 8
- Directed by: Peter Werner
- Written by: Graham Yost
- Cinematography by: Francis Kenny
- Editing by: Keith Henderson
- Original air date: March 6, 2012
- Running time: 39 minutes

Guest appearances
- Mykelti Williamson as Ellstin Limehouse; Jere Burns as Wynn Duffy; David Andrews as Sheriff Tillman Napier; Rick Gomez as AUSA David Vasquez; Max Perlich as Sammy Tonin; William Ragsdale as Gary Hawkins; Stephen Root as Judge Mike Reardon; Stephen Tobolowsky as FBI Agent Jerry Barkley; Stoney Westmoreland as Detective Garrity; Tim DeZarn as Detective Dempsey; Demetrius Grosse as Errol; Cleavon R. McClendon III as Bernard; Neal McDonough as Robert Quarles; Lynda Kay as Herself

Episode chronology
← Previous "The Man Behind the Curtain"	Next → "Loose Ends"
- Justified (season 3)

"Watching the Detectives" is the eighth episode of the third season of the American Neo-Western television series Justified. It is the 34th overall episode of the series and was written by series developer Graham Yost and directed by Peter Werner. It originally aired on FX on March 6, 2012.

The series is based on Elmore Leonard's stories about the character Raylan Givens, particularly "Fire in the Hole", which serves as the basis for the episode. The series follows Raylan Givens, a tough deputy U.S. Marshal enforcing his own brand of justice. The series revolves around the inhabitants and culture in the Appalachian Mountains area of eastern Kentucky, specifically Harlan County where many of the main characters grew up. In the episode, Quarles and Duffy work to incriminate Raylan so he can stop interfering with their interests.

According to Nielsen Media Research, the episode was seen by an estimated 2.16 million household viewers and gained a 0.8 ratings share among adults aged 18–49. The episode received near universal acclaim from critics, who praised the writing, pace, directing, character development and performances (with many highlighting Neal McDonough).

== Plot ==
The FBI intercepts a call where Sammy Tonin (Max Perlich) falsely claims that Raylan (Timothy Olyphant) works for Boyd (Walton Goggins). Quarles (Neal McDonough) and Duffy (Jere Burns) take Gary (William Ragsdale) to Winona's (Natalie Zea) previous house and Quarles kills Gary and they leave the scene. Later, Quarles is approached by Limehouse (Mykelti Williamson), seeking to profit from both sides of the Quarles/Boyd feud but Quarles rebuffs Limehouse's offer

Raylan is called by Detective Dempsey (Stoney Westmoreland) to Gary's crime scene to recognize the body. During the discussion, Dempsey suggests that Winona may be involved in his murder, prompting Raylan to leave. The recent events cause Agent Jerry Barkley (Stephen Tobolowsky) to ask AUSA Vasquez (Rick Gomez) for Raylan's file. Raylan informs Winona about Gary's murder, devastating her. Mullen (Nick Searcy) informs Raylan that they found a bullet casing on the scene with Raylan's fingerprints (the same bullet he threw at Duffy to threaten him). The FBI investigates Raylan and while they allow him to leave, they take his gun.

Dempsey goes to Quarles' home to question Duffy. They are alerted as Duffy "didn't paint the room", implying a murder took place in the home. They introduce themselves to Dempsey and are taken to the office to testify. Both Quarles and Duffy frame Raylan on their testimonies. Winona is also asked to participate in an interrogation, where she is told about Gary's attempt to kill her and Raylan. An upset Winona confronts Raylan about withholding the information and leaves the office. To complicate things for Raylan, Barkley and Vasquez have arrived to arrest Raylan under corruption charges.

Sheriff Napier (David Andrews) barely survives an attempt on his life when his cruiser explodes. He immediately has Boyd arrested as a suspect of the bombing. He then uses this as a publicity stunt to promote his re-election campaign as Sheriff. However, this is all revealed to be a ruse orchestrated by Napier to frame Boyd. Raylan evades the FBI questions and Tim (Jacob Pitts) helps him escape the office as he suspects Quarles put an incriminating weapon in his car. Winona calls him to tell him that she found the weapon at her old house and they meet in a park so Winona gives her the weapon to dispose of it. While she helps Raylan, she tells him not to come and find her. Raylan's name is cleared as Barkley refuses to give the source of his tip, which prevents the case from going forward.

Quarles is informed by Sammy about Raylan's release and is told that his boss does not view him as a safe choice and is cutting ties with him. An enraged Quarles tries to shoot Sammy but can't bring himself to do it. Raylan later visits Quarles' vacated house to find Duffy painting a room, and warns him to distance himself from Quarles, as Quarles is going down and will take Wynn with him. A shaken Quarles ignores a call from his family and is revealed to be using Oxy. Quarles goes alone to Noble's Holler and sheepishly asks Limehouse for assistance.

== Production ==
=== Development ===
In February 2012, it was reported that the eighth episode of the third season would be titled "Watching the Detectives", and was to be directed by Peter Werner and written by series developer Graham Yost.

=== Writing ===
Series developer Graham Yost teased that Raylan's and Boyd's relationship would play a pivotal role on the episode. He also explained the beginning of the episode where someone tried to plant something on Raylan's car, "our logic there was that the bartender saw someone by the car, and by being seen, that person left before they could plant the gun. That probably would've been Mike, Duffy’s henchman. He couldn't plant it in the car, so he went to Plan B, which was to plant it in Winona's house."

On Gary's death in the episode, Yost said, "as much as we love Billy Ragsdale and I think Gary is this wonderful character — this weird sort of endearing, earnest weasel — let us not forget that he actually contracted to have Winona and Raylan killed last season. That ultimately, in the universe of a show like this, cannot go unpunished." While working on the episode, the writers used the scene in "Harlan Roulette" where Raylan throws a bullet at Duffy and decided to use the bullet to kill Gary, which would trigger the events of the episode. The lines "Deputy, that might be the coolest thing I've ever laid ears on" and "I mean, she's older for a Victoria's Secret girl, but that's how you know she knows what she's doing" were improvised during the filming day.

Napier's role was previously addressed by Yost, explaining, "we were interested, in this political season, in doing some sort of politics. You can read interesting stories in Tennessee or Kentucky or any part of the country where there could be pretty wild-ass shenanigans going on. We'd heard about one contest where there was a car blown up, or an attempt to blow up a car, and bribery, and shots fired. That became our inspiration. We just liked the idea of this guy who was cruising toward a victory, and in comes someone who gives him a bucketful of cash. It's that temptation, and he crosses a line."

While Yost is credited as the writer of the episode, he said that the confrontation between Raylan and Duffy wasn't written by him, crediting producer Taylor Elmore and actors Jere Burns and Timothy Olyphant for the scene, "I had written a far less energetic scene that wasn't nearly as good. So that was something that the team created."

=== Casting ===
Despite being credited, Joelle Carter and Erica Tazel do not appear in the episode as their respective characters. Yost confessed that "if there's any great failing of this season, it's that we haven't used enough of Erica. We will find more fun stuff to do with Rachel next year."

The episode includes a guest appearance by Lynda Kay as herself, playing "Jack & Coke". The show previously used a song of hers on "Brother's Keeper". Yost explains, "as we were in the writers room getting set for season 3 and starting to write, Lynda came and visited and played two songs for us. We were just struck by her presence, and I've always loved that song 'Jack & Coke'. It's a Justified kind of song."

=== Filming ===
The episode was filmed back-to-back with the previous episode, "The Man Behind the Curtain", in order to save time for filming. Yost said, "we knew that 308, and 307 to a certain extent, needed to have a lot of Marshals office stuff."

== Reception ==
=== Viewers ===
In its original American broadcast, "Watching the Detectives" was seen by an estimated 2.16 million household viewers and gained a 0.8 ratings share among adults aged 18–49, according to Nielsen Media Research. This means that 0.8 percent of all households with televisions watched the episode. This was a slight increase in viewership from the previous episode, which was watched by 2.15 million viewers with a 0.9 in the 18-49 demographics.

=== Critical reviews ===
"Watching the Detectives" received near universal acclaim from critics. Seth Amitin of IGN gave the episode an "amazing" 9.5 out of 10 and wrote, "Now there's some of that in Justified, certainly with Ava and Boyd. But the difference is that Raylan in this episode is the same Raylan from episode 1. Winona is not the same, but she's had some pretty big life-altering events that would change a person. Gutterson is a pretty chill dude, which he always has been. Art Mullins continues to chew out Raylan, but keeps him on board—and we finally got an answer why: because he was once like him at some level. Adding in a Quarles pretty seamlessly, and yet making him stick out like a sore thumb, is a credit to this crew. This is the best this series has been and I get the feeling it's only going to get better."

Scott Tobias of The A.V. Club gave the episode an "A−" grade and wrote, "While 'Watching The Detectives' does its share of juggling, with bits about Limehouse's shadowy machinations and Tanner's attempt to return to the fold and Sheriff Napier's explosive reelection campaign, but it happens within a satisfying structure and the payoffs are many." Kevin Fitzpatrick of Screen Crush wrote, "Sigh, pour one out for ol' Gary Hawkins, ya'll. Justified may have been renewed for a fourth season, but you sir have been left in the dust! And with Winona gone once more, how else can we test the anger boundaries of Raylan Givens with only five episodes remaining? Will the third season finish out with at least a few more body bags?"

Alan Sepinwall of HitFix wrote, "Though there are plenty of dark moments in 'Watching the Detectives' – the threat of what Quarles might do to the cop if he opened the bedroom door, Winona dealing with both Gary's death and the knowledge that her ex-husband tried to have her killed – I spent nearly the entire episode with a very large grin on my face, as various characters made fiendishly clever moves and counter-moves." Luke de Smet of Slant Magazine wrote, "This is a great episode for Art and Tim, who are both just the right combination of badass and hilarious. Now, if only they can find something else for Rachel to do."

Ben Lee of Digital Spy wrote, "What an episode. While last week's 'The Man Behind the Curtain' was more of a transitional episode, 'Watching the Detectives' wastes no time in getting started with a brutally abrupt death and continuing with Raylan Givens finding himself in a real pickle as the local police department and the FBI launch investigations into him." Joe Reid of Vulture wrote, "This episode kind of stacks the deck in terms of just how many kinds of crazy are swirling around in Quarles's head."

Todd VanDerWerff of Los Angeles Times wrote, "I think I say this every time we have an episode of Justified this good, but this show is at its best when it's backing its characters into corners and seeing what happens." Dan Forcella of TV Fanatic gave the episode a 4.5 star rating out of 5 and wrote, "Each season of Justified has been so outstanding because the writers find different ways to make each episode interesting in its own way. Whether it's a thrill-a-minute shootout, a game of chess filled with impressive speeches, or in the case of 'Watching the Detectives', a simultaneous look into the problems of Raylan's past and certain problems of his future, Justified always entertains." Jack McKinney of Paste gave the episode a 9.2 rating out of 10 and wrote, "The rest was as inevitable as it was devastating. Winona making one last play for her man and then asking one favor of grace. Raylan stunned, almost broken, but always looking ahead and to the job. There are still bad men to punish and scales to level. And that's no joke."
