= Watching the Detectives =

Watching the Detectives may refer to:

- Watching the Detectives (film), a 2007 romantic comedy film written and directed by Paul Soter
- "Watching the Detectives" (song), a 1977 single by English singer-songwriter Elvis Costello
- "Watching the Detectives" (Between the Lines), a 1992 television episode
- "Watching the Detectives" (Justified), a 2012 television episode
- Watching the Detectives, a strand of detective shows, between 2002 and 2005 on BBC Two
- Watching the Detectives, a 2005 British daytime game show on ITV
- Watching the Detectives, a 5 part, 2003 crime documentary series on BBC One
- Watching the Detectives (2008 TV series), a 2008 American NYPD detectives show on A&E (TV network)
