= Steven G. Kaplan =

American film producer (born 1962)

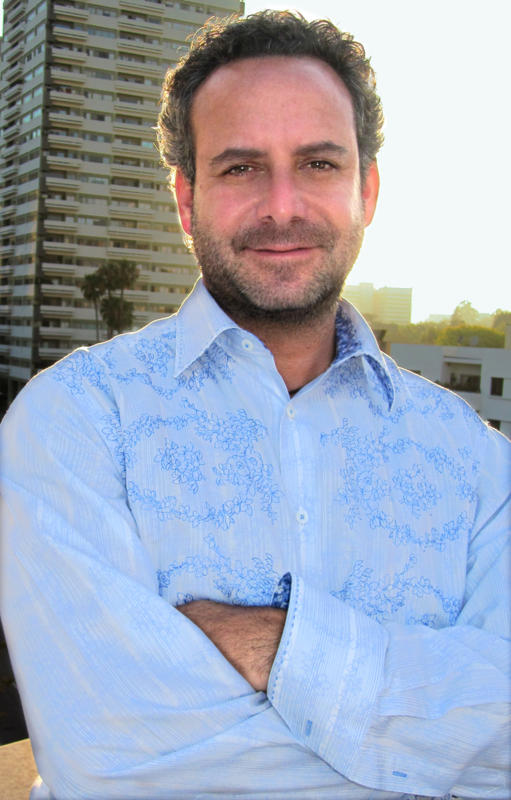
- Steven G. Kaplan
- Born: February 23, 1962 (age 64); San Marino, California
- Years active: 2002-present
- Spouse(s): Kimberly Daniel Kaplan; 1984-2012

Steven G. Kaplan (born February 23, 1962) is an American film and television producer, the co-founder of the film production company Rainstorm Entertainment.

== Career ==
Kaplan co-founded Rainstorm Entertainment along with Gregg Daniel. Rainstorm Entertainment was confirmed in November 2003 to produce and finance the documentary film Fuck, with production scheduled to begin in January 2004. The film was completed in 2005 by film director Steve Anderson's film company Mudflap Films; it was executive produced by Steven Kaplan and Gregg Daniel, along with Bruce Leiserowitz, Jory Weitz and Richard Ardi.

== Filmography ==
Title	Year	Position	Director	Notes
Terror Tract	2000	Executive producer	Lance W. Dreesen and Clint Hutchison	Winner, Pegasus Audience Award (Brussels International Festival of Fantasy Film); Winner, Silver Raven (Brussels International Festival of Fantasy Film); Winner, Best Feature (Rhode Island International Horror Film Festival); Winner, Festival Prize (Shriekfest)
The Big Empty	2003	Producer	Steve Anderson	Steve Anderson made his directorial debut in 2003 with this film starring Daryl Hannah and Jon Favreau.
Fuck	2005	Executive producer	Steve Anderson	The movie was shown for the first time on November 7, 2005 at the AFI Film Festival. The 2005 AFI Film Festival was held at the ArcLight Hollywood on Sunset Boulevard in Hollywood, California.
Big Bad Wolf	2006	Executive producer	Lance W. Dreesen	Winner, Silver Award, Best Science Fiction/Fantasy/Horror Film, (WorldFest Houston)
Red White Black and Blue	2006	Executive producer	Tom Putnam	Winner, Special Jury Prize, Best Score (BendFilm Festival)
Lost Colony: The Legend of Roanoke (also known as Wraiths of Roanoke)	2007	Executive producer	Matt Codd	Television movie starring actor Adrian Paul
I Am An Island	2008	Executive producer	Jennifer DeLia	Short film
John Henry: A Steel Driving Horse	2010	Executive producer	Cameron Duddy and Chris Koby	Documentary film about a Thoroughbred racehorse.
Billy Bates	2011	Executive producer	Jennifer DeLia	Feature film about a "tormented artist"; made with assistance of Julie Pacino, daughter of actor Al Pacino.
Sunset Strip	2012	Executive producer	Hans Fjellestad	Documentary film about the Sunset Strip in Los Angeles, California; the film was screened at the South by Southwest film festival.
State of Control (also known as Tibet in Ruins)	2013	Producer	Christian Johnston and Darren Mann	Documentary film about Tibet; according to The Washington Post, filmmakers had to deal with cyberwarfare against their computers during production.
Its So Easy and Other Lies	2013	Producer	Christopher Duddy	Documentary film about biography of Duff McKagan, bass player for music group Guns N' Roses.
Blunt Force	2013	Executive producer	Daniel Zirilli	
Sunny	2013	Producer	Michael Oblowitz	Documentary film about biography of Sunny Garcia, surfer
Black Beauty	2014	Executive Producer	Daniel Zirilli	Feature family film about a girl, her amazing horse and her relationship with her dad
Isolation	2015	Executive Producer	Shane Dax Taylor	Feature action film starring Dominic Purcell and Stephen Lang

== Arrest ==
On March 31, 2017, Kaplan allegedly threatened to kill another tenant in the pool area of a Hollywood apartment building, pointing what appeared to be a rifle and threatening pedestrians on the street below. Police took him into custody the next day, after a six-hour standoff. His weapon was determined to be a pellet rifle. In November 2018, Kaplan pleaded no contest to two felony counts of criminal threats. Under the plea deal, he received a suspended prison sentence of three years, four years probation, and was required to undergo drug testing and attend anger management classes.
