= Rampage (1987 film) =

1987 film by William Friedkin

- Promotional poster
- Directed by: William Friedkin
- Screenplay by: William Friedkin
- Based on: Rampage; 1985 novel by William P. Wood
- Produced by: William Friedkin; David Salven
- Starring: Michael Biehn; Alex McArthur; Nicholas Campbell; Deborah Van Valkenburgh
- Cinematography: Robert D. Yeoman
- Edited by: Jere Huggins
- Music by: Ennio Morricone
- Production company: De Laurentiis Entertainment Group
- Distributed by: Miramax Films
- Release dates: September 24, 1987 (Boston); October 30, 1992 (United States)
- Running time: 97 minutes
- Country: United States
- Language: English
- Budget: $7.5 million
- Box office: $796,368

Rampage is a 1987 American crime drama film written, produced and directed by William Friedkin. The film stars Michael Biehn, Alex McArthur, and Nicholas Campbell. Friedkin wrote the script based on the novel of the same name by William P. Wood, which was inspired by the life of serial killer Richard Chase.

The film premiered at the Boston Film Festival on September 24, 1987, but its theatrical release was stalled for five years due to production company and distributor De Laurentiis Entertainment Group going bankrupt. In 1992, Miramax obtained distribution rights and gave the film a limited release in North America. For the Miramax release, Friedkin reedited the film and changed the ending. Critical reviews were mixed, though sharply polarized.

== Plot ==
Charles Reece is a serial killer who commits a number of brutal mutilation-slayings in order to drink blood as a result of paranoid delusions. Reece is soon captured. Most of the film revolves around the trial and the prosecutor's attempts to have Reece found sane and given the death penalty. Defense lawyers, meanwhile, argue that the defendant is not guilty by reason of insanity. The prosecutor, Anthony Fraser, was previously against capital punishment, but he seeks such a penalty in the face of Reece's brutal crimes after meeting one victim's grieving family.

In the end, Reece is found sane and given the death penalty, but Fraser's internal debate about capital punishment is rendered academic when Reece is found to be insane by a scanning of his brain for mental illness. In the ending of the original version of the film, Reece is found dead in his cell, having overdosed himself on antipsychotics he had been stockpiling.

=== Alternate ending ===
In the ending of the revised version, Reece is sent to a state mental hospital, and in a chilling coda, he sends a letter to a person whose wife and child he has killed, asking the man to come and visit him. A final title card reveals that Reece is scheduled for a parole hearing in six months.

== Cast ==
- Michael Biehn as Anthony Fraser
- Alex McArthur as Charlie Reece
- Nicholas Campbell as Albert Morse
- Deborah Van Valkenburgh as Kate Fraser
- John Harkins as Dr. Keddie
- Art LaFleur as Mel Sanderson
- Billy Greenbush as Judge McKinsey
- Royce D. Applegate as Gene Tippetts
- Grace Zabriskie as Naomi Reece
- Carlos Palomino as Nestode
- Roy London as Dr. Paul Rudin
- Donald Hotton as Dr. Leon Gables
- Andy Romano as Spencer Whaley
- Patrick Cronin as Harry Bellenger
- Whitby Hertford as Andrew Tippetts
- Brenda Lilly as Eileen Tippetts
- Roger Nolan as Dr. Roy Blair
- Rosalyn Marshall as Sally Ann
- Joseph Whipp as Dr. George Mahon
- Angelo Vitale as Assistant District Attorney
- Paul Gaddoni as Aaron Tippetts

== Influences ==
Charles Reece is a composite of several serial killers, and primarily based on Richard Chase. Chase committed his crimes in Sacramento, California during late 1977 and early 1978, rather than in Stockton, California during late 1986 like in Rampage.

Reece's victims are slightly different from Chase's. Reece kills three women, a man and a young boy, whereas Chase killed two men, two women (one of whom was pregnant), a young boy and a 22-month-old baby. Additionally, Reece escapes at one point—which Chase did not do—murdering two guards and later a priest. However, Reece and Chase had a similar history of being institutionalized for mental illness prior to their murders, along with sharing a fascination with drinking blood. Their murders are both motivated by the belief that they need blood since their heart and internal organs are failing. The two had friends and girlfriends during their childhood/teen years, before descending into mental illness during early adulthood. The mental institution that Reece served at was called "Sunnyslope", whereas Chase's real life mental institution was called Beverly Manor. Reece disposes of one of his child victims in a box inside a garbage bin, and it takes a long time for the police to find the decomposed corpse. This is directly inspired by Chase's murder of 22-month-old David Ferreira in January 1978. Ferreira was murdered along with his cousin, aunt and a male friend of his aunt, when Chase randomly entered their house. Chase took the baby's body to his apartment to decapitate it and consume the brains, later placing his corpse in a box in a garbage bin, which was not discovered by police until two months after Chase's arrest. When police search Reece's home, they discover brains there, but it isn't ever explicitly mentioned that Reece consumed the brains of the boy he murdered. During the mass murder at Ferreira's aunt's house, Chase cut open her organs, having also done this to a previous pregnant victim whose house he entered when she was alone. All of Chase's other victims were boys and men that he shot and didn't cut open like the women. In Rampage, it is said that Reece only cuts open the organs of his female victims, and that he just shoots the others.

Additional elements directly inspired by Chase include Reece's killing of neighborhood dogs, Reece wearing a bright colored ski parka during his murders and walking into the houses of his victims, and Reece's paranoia about being poisoned. When Reece is incarcerated, he refuses to eat the prison food since he believes it has been poisoned, which mirrors the behavior of Chase in prison, who tried to get the food he was being served tested since he thought it was poisoned. When Chase had his trial, the prosecution built their case around the notion that he knew what he was doing was wrong, and that the crimes were premeditated. Something which helped support this argument was the fact that Chase wore rubber gloves during the murders. Reece only wears gloves in the second of his two home invasion murders, and the usage of gloves is never brought up during his trial. In the 1992 cut, Reece was potentially going to be paroled from a Californian mental health facility. He was sent to this facility when brain scans help prove his madness, after having originally been sentenced to death. Chase, on the other hand, was sentenced to death without the possibility of being freed, but before the sentence could be carried out overdosed on prescribed pills in his cell. Chase's suicide occurred in San Quentin Prison in 1980, a few months after he had a brief stay in a facility for the criminally insane, which he was temporarily sent to after behaving psychotically during his first few months at San Quentin. The original 1987 cut had Reece overdosing on pills, just before the brain scan results came in, which would have helped get his death sentence overturned. In the early 1990s, Friedkin said he didn't have Reece commit suicide in the second cut since having him be released from prison fitted better with the traditions of the United States. In both versions of the film, Reece lives with his mother and has a job at a gas station. When Chase's crimes were being committed, he lived alone in an apartment and was unemployed. Reece's father is also said to have died when he was a child, whereas Chase's father was still alive when his crimes were being committed.

While Chase was noted for having an unkempt appearance and exhibiting traits of paranoid schizophrenia in public, the film's makers intended to portray Reece as "quietly insane, not visually crazed." Alex McArthur said in 1992 that "Friedkin didn't want me to play the guy as a raging maniac. We tried to illustrate the fact that many serial killers are clean-cut, ordinary appearing men who don't look the part. They aren't hideous monsters." To prepare for the role, Friedkin introduced McArthur to a psychiatrist who deals with schizophrenics. He showed McArthur video tapes of interviews with different serial killers and other schizoids.

The incident where Reece goes on a rampage after escaping custody was inspired by a real-life event in Illinois, that occurred while the film was in production. In this event, the killer painted his face silver, something which Reece also does.

The film had a negative portrayal of courtroom experts, and this was personally motivated by Friedkin's ongoing custody battle for his son, which he was having with his ex-wife.

== Production and release ==
=== Background ===
The 1985 novel the film was based on was written by William P. Wood, a Californian prosecutor involved with the 1979 trial of Richard Chase. Wood sent the novel to Friedkin, who then decided to make a film about it, with the project first being announced in December 1985. In December 1985, Friedkin sought the advice of a defence lawyer, Colleen Grace, about the accuracy of the source novel and about arguments used against the death penalty. In January 1986, she sent Friedkin copies from various cases, and observed that lawyers often try to appeal to the jury's humanity in death penalty cases. Friedkin also read up on Chase extensively, and in February 1986, he corresponded with the District Attorney's Office in Sacramento who had prosecuted the case. They supplied him with a detailed list of Chase's acts, many of which Friedkin used for his murderer's habits and activities. In January 1986, Friedkin faced backlash when he mentioned to a Chicago hospital's newspaper that he was consulting doctors and that the film was going to "show the world through the eyes of a killer who is also schizophrenic". This article generated several angry letters from readers, who believed that Friedkin was trying to create a link between schizophrenia and murder. The writers were a combination of health professionals and members of the public, particularly parents of schizophrenic children, and some of the letters were part of a concerted campaign by the Alliance for the Mentally Ill, whose membership numbered 30,000 at that time. When this controversy arose, the first draft of the screenplay still hadn't been written yet.

In an October 1992 interview on Charlie Rose, Friedkin discussed the film, and said he wanted to create films "which concern themselves with the way we live now. [And] those issues that have a real edge to them, and are of vital concern to people." He added that, "I won't just want to make a film about four teenagers having sex in the back of a car, which is your average summer picture these days. I mostly want to make films that are dealing with ideas." The issue of the death penalty was a recurring theme in Friedkin's work, as his first film, 1962's The People vs. Paul Crump, was a documentary in support of a man on death row. In another October 1992 interview with The Harvard Crimson, Friedkin claimed that he didn't have strong feelings either for or against the death penalty, but "wouldn't lose sleep" if someone like Jeffrey Dahmer was sentenced to death. He added in this interview that Rampage was an accurate depiction of the Richard Chase case, saying "it outlines the facts of the original case closely, almost too closely", and also said that the film's usage of violence wasn't sensationist, due to the briefness of it.

In the Charlie Rose interview, Friedkin said actor Michael Biehn was the biggest name in Rampage, and that it didn't use a particularly well-known cast. In a December 1985 Hollywood Reporter article, it was said that actor William Petersen was attached to Rampage, although he did not end up appearing in the film. Petersen had worked on Friedkin's previous film To Live and Die in L.A..

=== Filming and premiere of the original cut ===
Rampage was filmed between October 28, 1986, and December 1986 in Stockton and Lodi, California, with the film itself taking place during early 1987 during the trial parts. The prison scenes were shot at the Lodi Prison, and the elderly woman Reece shoots at the beginning of the film was portrayed by Stockton resident Gayle Beeman. Some of the local extras were unaware of what the film was about when they signed up to be in it. In an interview with Ain't It Cool News in 2011, Biehn described Rampage as a "pretty good movie", contrasting it with his later Friedkin collaboration, Jade (1995), which he considered a "complete and total disaster." Biehn also recounted a confrontation during the filming of Rampage in Stockton, where Friedkin reprimanded him for not staying at the hotel he was designated to stay at with his family. This led to a heated exchange where Biehn stood up to Friedkin, after which Friedkin did not trouble him further on the project. Biehn had spent weeks working with Friedkin on the script and character development, having meetings at Friedkin's home and restaurants, with Friedkin's outburst about the hotel coming as a surprise to Biehn.

It had a one-day only fundraising premiere at the Stockton Royal Theaters in August 1987, and was screened there again in January 1988. Author William P. Wood was in attendance for the January 1988 screening, where he signed copies of the book. Some walked out of the theater during the January 1988 screening, due to the film's violence. It played at the last night of the Boston Film Festival in September 1987, and had a very limited theatrical release in some European countries during the late 1980s.

=== American theatrical delay and 1992 Miramax cut ===
It was originally scheduled to be theatrically released in the United States during mid-February 1988, but this release date never came to fruition. Plans for the film's domestic theatrical release were shelved when producer DEG (De Laurentiis Entertainment Group) went bankrupt in August 1988. The film was unreleased in North America for five years. During that time, director Friedkin reedited the film, and changed the ending (with Reece no longer committing suicide in jail) before its US release in October 1992. The European video versions usually feature the film's original 1987 ending. The original cut of the film has a 1987 copyright date in the credits, while the later cut has a 1992 copyright date, and includes new distributor Miramax's logo at the beginning, instead of DEG's. The 1992 cut lists Miramax Film Corporation as the copyright holder in the credits, while De Laurentiis Entertainment Group is listed as the copyright holder in the credits of the original cut. The original cut also has the standard disclaimer in the credits about the events and characters being fictitious, unlike the later cut, which has a customized disclaimer, mentioning that it was partly inspired by real events. When it is announced at the end of the 1992 cut that Reece is eligible for parole, it is said that he has served four years at a Californian mental health facility, and that the parole hearing is in six months. This would place Reece's potential release date as being in 1992, when the second cut was released. The original cut ends on a less ominous note, showing the husband of one of Reece's victims at a fair with his son following Reece's suicide.

In a retrospective 2013 interview, Friedkin said: "at the time we made Rampage, [producer] Dino De Laurentiis was running out of money. He finally went bankrupt, after a long career as a producer. He was doing just scores of films and was unable to give any of them his real support and effort. And so literally by the time it came to release Rampage, he didn’t have the money to do it. And he was not only the financier, but the distributor. His company went bankrupt, and the film went to black for about five years. Eventually, the Weinsteins' company Miramax took it out of bankruptcy and rereleased it. But this was among the lowest points in my career." There was a year long negotiation with Miramax, and a disappointing test screening of the original cut. The changes that Friedkin made with the 1992 cut addressed concerns from Miramax that the film was not coherent enough, in addition to addressing Friedkin's changing stance towards the death penalty. The 1992 cut included a previously unreleased scene of Reece buying a handgun at the beginning and lying about his history of mental illness (just as Richard Chase did), whereas the original cut begins with one of Reece's murders, without explaining any of his background.

Regarding the five-year gap between the film's American release, McArthur said in 1992: "It was a weird experience. First it was coming out and then it wasn't, back and forth. The fact that it was released at all is amazing." McArthur added that: "I've changed a lot since that picture was made. I have three children now and I'm not sure I would play the part today. I certainly wouldn't want my kids to see it."

Beginning on October 30, 1992, the film played at 175 theaters in the United States, grossing roughly half a million dollars against a budget of several million dollars. McArthur said in 1992 that the film was never intended to be a big commercial hit.

== Soundtrack ==
The film's score was composed, orchestrated, arranged and conducted by Ennio Morricone and was released on vinyl LP, cassette and compact disc by Virgin Records.

== Reception ==
The film received a polarized response. Some critics ranked Rampage among Friedkin's best work. In his review, film critic Roger Ebert gave Rampage three stars out of four, saying: "This is not a movie about murder so much as a movie about insanity—as it applies to murder in modern American criminal courts...Friedkin['s] message is clear: Those who commit heinous crimes should pay for them, sane or insane. You kill somebody, you fry—unless the verdict is murky or there were extenuating circumstances." Janet Maslin of The New York Times praised the acting and commented: "Rampage has a no-frills, realistic look that serves its subject well, and it avoids an exploitative tone."

Owen Gleiberman of Entertainment Weekly called the film "despicable", saying that the "movie devolves into hateful propaganda" and "its muddled legal arguments come off as cover for a kind of righteous blood lust". Stephen King, an admirer of Rampage, wrote a letter to the magazine defending the film.

Desson Howard of The Washington Post noted that in the film's five-year delay, there had been several high-profile serial killer cases, saying: "In this Jeffrey Dahmer era, McArthur's claims of unseen voices and delusions that he needed to replace his contaminated blood with others' are familiar tabloid fare", however, he noted that despite this, the film "still preserves a horrifying edge." In a separate 1992 review for The Washington Post, Richard Harrington had a more negative view, criticizing the film for feeling like a made for television feature, and claiming that it had a dated look to it due to its long delay. Gene Siskel believed the only reason the film was getting an American theatrical release after five years was because of the success of the 1991 serial killer film The Silence of the Lambs, saying that Rampage's subjects "may be fascinating but are hardly commercial, particularly when the killings are so gruesome." He also characterized it as having less of a "glamorous" portrayal of serial killers than The Silence of the Lambs, and believed the film would have been stronger if it focused more on the court room aspects and cut out the murder scenes.

On the review aggregator website Rotten Tomatoes, 55% of 11 critics' reviews are positive.

In 2009, Games Radar included it on a list of "The Most Delayed Movies Ever", and labelled it a "dark little thriller". Taste of Cinema placed it sixth on a list of "The 10 Darkest Serial Killer Movies of All Time". In 2021, Patrick Jankiewicz of Fangoria wrote: "Half-serial killer thriller, half-courtroom drama, Rampage is an unnerving study on the nature of evil and what society should do about it."

In retrospect, William Friedkin said: "There are a lot of people who [now] love Rampage, but I don’t think I hit my own mark with that". In another interview, Friedkin said he thought the film failed because audiences perceived it as being too serious, and they were expecting something different from him.

== Home media ==
Friedkin's original cut featuring the alternate ending and some additional footage was released on LaserDisc in Japan by Shochiku Home Video in 1990. The original cut was also released on VHS in the United Kingdom on March 9, 1989. This release was handled by CBS/Fox Video, a joint venture between CBS and 20th Century Fox. In early 1989, CBS/Fox Video still had an international distribution agreement in place with De Laurentiis Entertainment Group, who went bankrupt in August 1988.

During February 1992, the second cut's owner Miramax struck a deal with Paramount Home Entertainment to distribute their films on home video. In late 1992, Paramount released the second cut of Rampage on VHS in the United States. The home video distribution agreement with Paramount was terminated when Disney purchased Miramax in 1993, with Disney's Buena Vista Home Entertainment handling home video distribution for future Miramax films. The film's second cut would be released on LaserDisc in the U.S. in 1994. This 1994 LaserDisc release was still handled by Paramount Home Entertainment, rather than Disney/Miramax. In December 2010, Disney sold Miramax to private equity firm Filmyard Holdings, without having ever issued the film on DVD or Blu-ray in the United States. At an undetermined date in the 2000s, the second cut of the film received a subtitled DVD release by SPI International in Poland, presumably having been licensed from Disney. Starting in 2011, Filmyard sublicensed the home video rights for Miramax's library to Lionsgate (for high-profile titles) and Echo Bridge Entertainment (for lower profile titles), although the second cut of Rampage was never released on DVD or Blu-ray during this period.

In March 2016, Filmyard Holdings sold Miramax to Qatari company beIN Media Group. Then in April 2020, ViacomCBS (later renamed Paramount Global and Paramount Skydance) acquired the rights to Miramax's 700 film catalog, after buying a 49% stake in the studio from beIN. Both cuts of Rampage are now part of Paramount's library, and Paramount Pictures have distributed it digitally since April 2020. The library of De Laurentiis Entertainment Group, the producer of the first cut, is now mostly owned by StudioCanal, although they do not control the rights to the first cut.

Both cuts have been released to digital platform Amazon Prime in standard definition. Newer prints of the second cut feature Miramax's New York City skyline opening logo, unlike earlier prints which had their 1987-1998 logo. In 2025, Kino Lorber released both cuts of Rampage to 4K UHD, in association with Paramount Home Entertainment. The release was delayed for nearly two years, as there were issues with finding the original film elements for one of the cuts. It included several special features. Among them are commentaries on both cuts with film historians Howard S. Berger and Nathaniel Thompson, and new interviews with actor Alex McArthur and true crime writer Harold Schechter. The original cut of the film for this release slightly differs than the version released on VHS in Europe, with the latter having one extra scene not present on the Kino Lorber release. It is unknown if this was truly part of the original cut or if it was added later for the European release.
