= I Live Here Now (film) =

2025 film by Julie Pacino

- Theatrical release poster
- Directed by: Julie Pacino
- Written by: Julie Pacino
- Produced by: Kyle Kaminsky
- Starring: Lucy Fry; Madeline Brewer; Sarah Rich; Lara Clear; Cara Seymour; Matt Rife; Sheryl Lee
- Cinematography: Aron Meinhardt
- Edited by: Mátyás Fekete; Raaghav Minocha
- Music by: Jackson Greenberg; Pam Autuori
- Production companies: Utopia; Punch Once
- Distributed by: Utopia; N8
- Release dates: July 24, 2025 (Fantasia); March 20, 2026 (United States); April 21, 2026 (VOD)
- Running time: 91 minutes
- Country: United States
- Language: English

I Live Here Now is a 2025 American horror thriller drama film written and directed by Julie Pacino in her feature directorial debut. It stars Lucy Fry, Madeline Brewer, Sarah Rich, Lara Clear, Cara Seymour, Matt Rife, and Sheryl Lee. The film follows a woman who finds herself trapped in a remote hotel where the violent echoes of her past come alive.

== Cast ==
- Lucy Fry as Rose
- Madeline Brewer as Lillian
- Matt Rife as Travis
- Sheryl Lee as Martha
- Sarah Rich as Sid
- Lara Clear as Ada
- Cara Seymour as Cindy
- Alex Gaumond as Dr. Neltman
- Anna Armstrong as Georgie

== Production ==
In December 2021, it was announced that Utopia would produce and distribute the film. On February 1, 2024, filming had completed. The film is produced by Kyle Kaminsky, Julie Pacino and co-produced by Lara Clear, Eliese Lissner, Robert MacCready. Robert Schwartzman, Cole Harper, Phil Toronto are executive producers.

== Release ==
The film had its world premiere at the 29th Fantasia International Film Festival on July 24, 2025 in the Compétition Cheval Noir. It was also screened at the 78th Locarno Film Festival in Out of Competition section on August 9 and at the Edinburgh International Film Festival for its United Kingdom premiere in Midnight Madness strand on August 17, 2025. It was screened at the Deauville American Film Festival in September 2025. It was released in the United States on March 20, 2026.

== Reception ==
On Rotten Tomatoes 87% of the reviews are positive, based on 15 reviews. Mary Beth McAndrews of Dread Central awarded the film four and a half stars out of five.
