= Sarah Aldrich =

American actress

- Born: Los Angeles, California, U.S.
- Education: University of California, Los Angeles
- Occupation: Actress
- Years active: 1996–present

Sarah Aldrich (born February 10) is an American actress. She is best known for playing the roles of Victoria Newman on the CBS soap opera The Young and the Restless (1997) and Courtney Kanelos on the ABC soap opera Port Charles (1998 to 2000).

== Early life ==
Aldrich was born in the Mission Hills neighborhood in Los Angeles, California and raised in Yuba City. When she was a child, she would put on plays in the backyard with her sisters, but she has said that it was just for fun. She first discovered her love for the theater in college, prompting her to attend the American Conservatory Theater training program and ultimately to earn a degree in theater at University of California, Los Angeles.

== Career ==
After college, Aldrich got an agent and began auditioning. She won her first professional acting job, guest starring on Silk Stalkings in 1996. She was cast in a recurring role on the NBC soap opera Days of Our Lives, playing Jill Stevens, a con artist, from 1996 to 1997.

In March 1997, it was announced that Aldrich would be joining the cast of the CBS soap opera The Young and the Restless, playing Victoria Newman. The role had previously been played by Heather Tom. Aldrich stayed on the show until October 1997, when Tom decided to return.

Aldrich appeared in the television films Born Into Exile and L.A. Johns in 1997. She guest starred on Diagnosis: Murder and Total Security. In 1998, Aldrich landed a recurring role as Gwyneth Adair on Beverly Hills, 90210. She also guest starred in an episode of Jenny that didn't air because the series was cancelled.

Aldrich was cast as Courtney Kanelos, a troublemaking schemer, on the ABC soap opera Port Charles. Her first air date was May 22, 1998. In October 1999, Aldrich played Catherine Winters in Roger Corman's The Phantom Eye. The series aired on AMC during Halloween weekend. She also guest starred on Partners in 1999.

In December 2000, it was announced that Aldrich would be leaving Port Charles because of storyline dictated reasons. Her last air date was November 3, 2000. In 2001, she played Angel in the film Backroad Motel. Aldrich played Cheyenne in the 2003 film Players (also titled Pledge of Allegiance and Red Zone). In 2003, she made guest appearances on CSI: Miami, Strong Medicine, Charmed, Joan of Arcadia, and Karen Sisco.

Aldrich played Sophie in the short film The Speeding Ticket in 2004. She made guest appearances on The D.A. and CSI: NY. In 2005, she starred as Hilly in the film Trees Grow Tall and Then They Fall. She also played Mary in the film Miracle at Sage Creek, co-starring with David Carradine. Aldrich appeared in the television film Ordinary Miracles, playing Miranda Powell. She guest starred on Cold Case. Aldrich played Beth in the play Ascension at the Electric Lodge theater in Los Angeles. The production ran from September 2 to October 9, 2005.

Aldrich starred in the play Hitchcock Blonde at Segerstrom Stage in Costa Mesa. She co-starred with Dakin Matthews, who played Alfred Hitchcock. The play ran from February 3 to March 12, 2006. In 2006, she played Gwen Cowley in the film Big Bad Wolf. She guest starred on Bones and Close to Home.

From 2009 to 2014, Aldrich made guest appearances on Cold Case, Without a Trace, Monk, Criminal Minds, Criminal Minds: Suspect Behavior, House, Scandal, and NCIS.

Aldrich had a recurring role as Ramona Niese on Bosch in 2017. She played Jeannette in the film Adopted in Danger (also titled Killing Your Daughter) in 2019. She also played Victoria Garrett in the Lifetime film Stressed to Death in 2019.

== Filmography ==
=== Film ===
Year	Title	Role	Notes
2001	Becoming Irish	Irish Girl	Short film
2001	Backroad Motel	Angel	
2002	The Syndicate	The Kid	Short film
2003	Players	Cheyenne; Emily	Also titled Pledge of Allegiance and Red Zone
2004	The Speeding Ticket	Sophie	Short film
2005	Trees Grow Tall and Then They Fall	Hilly	
2005	The Drifter	Victim No.4	Short film
2005	Miracle at Sage Creek	Mary	
2006	Big Bad Wolf	Gwen Cowley	
2008	Drived.	Lilly White	Short film
2009	The Inner Circle	Cora Dugan	Also titled Broken Angels Club
2013	Expecting	Nurse Butcher	
2019	Adopted in Danger	Jeannette	Also titled Killing Your Daughter

=== Television ===
Year	Title	Role	Notes
1996	Silk Stalkings	Amy	Episode: "Playing Doctor" Credited as Sara Aldrich
1996–1997	Days of Our Lives	Jill Stevens; Karen	Recurring role
1997	The Young and the Restless	Victoria Newman	Contract role; April–October 1997
1997	Born Into Exile	Jolene	Television film
1997	Diagnosis: Murder	Kyla Butterman	Episode: "Murder in the Air"
1997	L.A. Johns	Brandy	Television film
1997	Total Security	Maggie Hicks	Episode: "Who's Poppa?"
1998	Jenny	Monica	Episode: "A Girl's Gotta Make Room for Daddy: Part 1" Unaired episode
1998	Beverly Hills, 90210	Gwyneth Adair	2 episodes
1998–2000	Port Charles	Courtney Kanelos	Contract role; 366 episodes
1998–1999	General Hospital	Courtney Kanelos	Recurring role (Crossover episodes)
1999	The Phantom Eye	Catherine Winters	
1999	Partners		Episode: "Never Says Never Again"
2003	CSI: Miami	Wendy Judson	Episode: "Entrance Wound"
2003	Strong Medicine	Mona Jeffers	Episode: "Maternal Mirrors"
2003	Charmed	Natalie	Episode: "Forget Me...Not"
2003	Joan of Arcadia	Janet Milner	Episode: "The Boat"
2003	Karen Sisco	Mrs. DiNardo	Episode: "Nobody's Perfect"
2004	The D.A.	Patricia Henry	Episode: "The People vs. Patricia Henry"
2004	CSI: NY	Emily Dent	Episode: "Three Generations Are Enough"
2005	Ordinary Miracles	Miranda Powell	Television film
2005; 2010	Cold Case	Megan Easton	2 episodes
2006	Bones	Lucy McGruder	Episode: "The Superhero in the Alley"
2006	Close to Home	Sally Marin	Episode: "Silent Auction"
2009	Without a Trace	Elizabeth Walsh	Episode: "Labyrinths"
2009	Monk	Mrs. Cooper	Episode: "Mr. Monk's Favorite Show"
2011	Criminal Minds: Suspect Behavior	Maya Hazel	Episode: "Lonely Hearts"
2011	Criminal Minds	Jenna Dolan	Episode: "Dorado Falls"
2011	House	Faye	Episode: "Dead & Buried"
2012	90210	Madison's Mom	Episode: "Forever Hold Your Peace"
2012	Scandal	Maggie Andrews	Episode: "Spies Like Us"
2013	Mad Men	Peaches Rennet	Episode: "For Immediate Release"
2014	NCIS	Karen Upline	Episode: "Bulletproof"
2017	Bosch	Ramona Niese	3 episodes
2019	Stressed to Death	Victoria Garrett	Television film
