= Desperado (film series) =

1980s TV series

Desperado is a series of five Western television films starring Alex McArthur as the honest cowboy, Duell McCall, beginning with the 1987 installment also titled Desperado and directed by Virgil W. Vogel.

Throughout the film series, McCall is "a man of principle who roams the West of yesteryear helping people in trouble while struggling to get himself out of trouble—clearing himself of a false murder charge". McCall's quest centers on "searching for a witness who can prove his innocence". The first TV movie was originally intended to serve as the pilot for a weekly TV series, but the series did not materialize, and the film instead had four TV movie sequels, also starring McArthur as McCall. The title was inspired by the 1973 Eagles song Desperado, which also served as the theme music for the series, performed by Don Henley.

== Desperado (April 27, 1987) ==
In the first film, McCall "finds himself caught in the middle of a deadly feud in a frontier mining town", and falling in love with a local girl named Nora, played by Lise Cutter. The original screenplay was written by Elmore Leonard, who, with Walter Mirisch, convinced Brandon Tartikoff of NBC to finance the project. The film was produced by Mirisch's son Drew, who initially hired John Byrum to direct, but Byrum agreed to withdraw from the position when disharmony arose over the work he was producing. Virgil W. Vogel was then brought in to direct, and helmed the project to completion.

Although the film received "excellent notices and ratings", NBC declined to pick up it up as a series, preferring to order additional 2-hour TV movies continuing the story of the original.

== The Return of Desperado (February 15, 1988) ==
The second film centered on McCall dealing with "a crooked sheriff committing crimes and blaming others". After the second film broadcast, NBC sought to implement a series after all, but by that time, the contract obligating McArthur for a weekly series had expired. The actor, whose star was on the rise, was no longer interested in being "tied up to a weekly series". NBC then ordered two additional TV movies.

== Desperado: Avalanche at Devil's Ridge (May 24, 1988) ==
The third film centered on a character portrayed by Rod Steiger, playing "a desperate man who forces McCall to rescue his kidnapped daughter". This installment also featured singer and actor Hoyt Axton.

== Desperado: The Outlaw Wars (October 10, 1989) ==
In the fourth film, McCall "learns that he has fathered a son with Nora", and encounters "Richard Farnsworth as a serious-minded lawman, [and] James Remar as a cold-blooded killer".

== Desperado: Badlands Justice (December 17, 1989) ==
By the end of Badlands Justice, McCall had still not been able to clear his name, leading critics to anticipate further installments resolving this issue; however, no more of the films were made. Universal opted to end the series at this time, because "having a backlog of five of these films, for foreign distribution was about as far extended if they wanted to be".
