= Terror Tract =

- Written by: Clint Hutchison
- Directed by: Lance W. Dreesen ("Make Me an Offer" and "Bobo"); Clint Hutchison ("Nightmare" and "Come to Granny")
- Starring: John Ritter; David DeLuise; Allison Smith; Rachel York; Carmine Giovinazzo; Bryan Cranston; Brenda Strong; Will Estes
- Music by: Brian Tyler
- Country of origin: United States
- Original language: English

Production
- Producers: Gregg L. Daniel; Lance W. Dreesen; Steven G. Kaplan; Richard Mix
- Cinematography: Ken Blakey
- Editor: Scot Scalise
- Running time: 96 minutes
- Production companies: Giant Leap Entertainment; Rainstorm Entertainment
- Budget: <$10 million

Original release
- Network: USA Network
- Release: October 18, 2000

Terror Tract is a 2000 American dark comedy/horror anthology film directed by Lance W. Dreesen and Clint Hutchison. It premiered at the Sitges Film Festival in Spain in early October 2000, and on the 18th of that same month, it premiered in the United States on the USA Network. Throughout 2001 and 2002, the film was released in theaters, made available for home viewing, and presented at film festivals in various countries around the world.

== Plot ==
=== "Make Me an Offer" (frame) ===
The frame features John Ritter as real-estate agent Bob Carter who tries to sell a variety of homes to a young couple, the Doyles. Each home comes with a horror story associated with it. As the film progresses with each new home, Carter becomes more desperate to close a deal but keeps failing because of his commitment to have "full disclosure" about all the grisly occurrences that happened within each home, causing the Doyles to reject his deal offers.

=== "Nightmare" ===
A businessman named Louis discovers his wife, Sarah, cheating on him with another man, Frank. Louis catches them in the act and plans to shoot Frank and hang Sarah to make it appear like a murder-suicide crime scene. However, a fight ensues and Frank manages to kill Louis before dumping his body into a nearby lake. Sarah begins having recurring dreams about Louis as a water-drenched corpse coming home and strangling her. Frank and Sarah start getting paranoid when one of Louis's drinking buddies, Clay, who also happens to be a cop, starts coming around and asking questions. The couple finds Louis's car on the street without the keys, realizing they were left in Louis's pants pocket at the bottom of the lake. Frank goes to the lake and jumps in to retrieve the keys so they can dispose of the car. When Sarah sees wet footprints in front of the house and hears the soggy steps nearing her bedroom door, much like in her recurring nightmares, she shoots through the door with the shotgun (the same one Louis used and was eventually killed with) only to discover it was Frank at her door returning from the lake with the retrieved keys. The next morning, when the police arrive with Clay in tow, they find Frank shot to death and Sarah hanging from the ceiling, just as Louis had intended in the beginning. At the murder-suicide crime scene, the police notice that Sarah's body is drenched in slime.

=== "Bobo" ===
The Gatleys are the perfect family. The father, Ron, and his daughter, Jennifer, have a close bond. One day, Jennifer finds a small monkey wearing organ grinder attire in their tree, names it Bobo, and persuades her father to allow her to keep him until they can find his owner. Jennifer and Bobo begin forming a close bond while her bond with her father begins to weaken. Ron notices this and begins to grow suspicious of Bobo. The Gatleys' pet dog, Max, chases Bobo through the house before Bobo throws an object at Max's head, injuring the dog. Ron becomes livid and demands the monkey be put outside. When Jennifer defies her father, and Ron's wife, Carol, asks that he compromise, Ron agrees as long as Bobo gets a cage. When Ron attempts to put Bobo in the cage, Bobo bites his hand which leads to Ron demanding the monkey to be removed completely. He eventually gets Bobo in the cage and taunts the monkey, alongside Max who growls at the monkey, and promises to euthanize Bobo. The next morning, Ron discovers Max stabbed to death, the cage door open, and Bobo missing. Ron hides Max's body in the garage. Ron asks his wife and daughter to leave the home immediately, which they do. Now left alone at home, Ron calls the police but they refer him to the local pound dispatcher. Ron bribes the pound dispatcher to get the monkey out of his house. After burying Max in the back yard, Ron goes inside the house to find the pound dispatcher stabbed to death as well. He hides the pound dispatcher's body in the garage. When they return home and see Ron shooting at the monkey, both Carol and Jennifer now doubt Ron's sanity. While the family sleeps, Ron sets up a bear trap only for Bobo to trick him into thinking he had been trapped. While Ron investigates the bear trap, Bobo kills Carol by cutting her throat in bed. Now off the deep end, Ron goes after Bobo with the shotgun in Jennifer's room. As Bobo and Ron struggle in a fight, Ron loses the gun and Jennifer retrieves it. Ron pins Bobo to the ground and tells his daughter to give him the gun so he can end it. Jennifer shoots Ron instead. Back in the present time, Bob Carter tells the Doyles that the police believe Ron was responsible for the killings, and Jennifer shot him in self-defense, never saying another word after that since she became catatonic. As for Bobo, he simply disappeared.

=== "Come to Granny" ===
Dr. Lindsay, a troubled physician with psychic abilities, visits Dr. Corey, a therapist, in her office after hours to tell her of his visions in which he sees the Granny Killer killing his victims shortly before they happen. When he has these visions, he has debilitating fits that cause him to lose control. One vision caused him to fall in the shower and vomit. Another vision caused him to nearly drown his girlfriend while they swam in his family's pool. The third vision caused him to nearly collide head-on with a truck while driving, but it also prompted him to call the police since the vision was of his girlfriend getting murdered by the Granny Killer. Hoping to get there in time, he races to his girlfriend's house only to find her dismembered body parts strewn through the house. Sean reveals to Dr. Corey that she is the Granny Killer's next victim based on his most recent vision. Sean begins to reach for inside his jacket. Dr. Corey, now believing that Sean is the Granny Killer himself, drives Sean down onto a receipt letter spike on her desk and runs out of the office, heading for the elevators. As she anxiously waits for the elevator to reach her floor, Sean begins slowly coming towards her, badly wounded by the receipt letter spike jutting out of his chest. As both he and the elevator reach their destinations, Sean pulls the receipt letter spike from his chest, pulls out a gun to hand to Dr. Corey, but loses consciousness, and both he and the gun fall to the floor. At the same time, the elevator doors open, revealing the Granny Killer standing inside with a meat cleaver. Dr. Corey screams as the meat cleaver swings towards her.

=== "Make Me an Offer" (conclusion) ===
The Doyles refuse to buy any of the houses Bob Carter offers them because of the horror stories involved with each one. Carter realizes he failed to meet the deadline when his cell phone rings and the voice on the other side tells him Carter's wife and son are there on the other end of the phone. Carter's son gets on the phone and begs his father to close a deal now. Driven insane, Carter stabs Mr. Doyle in the neck, and as Mr. Doyle collapses to the floor with blood spurting from his neck, Carter begins stabbing him in the back. A horrified Mrs. Doyle runs out of the house to see a neighbor mowing over a cat buried neck-deep into the lawn. As she gets in the car to drive off, Carter appears at the driver's side window with bloody papers in his hand begging her to close the deal. As Mrs. Doyle drives off while screaming, Bobo the murderous monkey appears on her windshield, a woman shoots her husband in a driveway, an old woman smiles at her while a human leg sticks out of her trash can, and other murderous chaos occurs as Mrs. Doyle drives away from the hellish neighborhood.

== Cast ==
- John Ritter as Bob Carter
- David DeLuise as Allen Doyle
- Allison Smith as Mary Ann Doyle
- Rachel York as Sarah Freemont
- Carmine Giovinazzo as Frank Sarno
- Fredric Lehne as Louis Freemont
- Wade Williams as Clay Hendricks
- Bryan Cranston as Ron Gatley
- Katelin Petersen as Jennifer Gatley
- Jodi Harris as Carol Gatley
- Marcus Bagwell as Pound Dispatcher
- Brenda Strong as Dr. Helen Corey
- Will Estes as Sean Goodwin
- Lance W. Dreesen as Granny Killer (credited as "?")
- Carl Strano as Chief of Police
- Jeff Ricupito as Police Officer
- Brent Strachan as Police Officer
- Julieann Getman as Police Officer
- Harrison Held as Medical Examiner
- Shonda Farr as Jasmine
- Barbara Jansen as Margaret Goodwin
- Jerry Day as Robert Goodwin
- Branwen Mayfair as Woman Victim
- Lynda Kay as Teacher
- Rafaella Forero as Cleaning Woman
- Allen Simpson as Jasmine's Friend
- Kim Correll as Housewife
- Kelli Mix as Stroller Mom
- Aaron J. Alberts as Lawnmower Man
- Virginia Darragh as Driveway Grandma
- Cathy Hutchison as Gun Toting Housewife
- Paul E. Short as Jogger
- Ray Lykins as Car Driver
- Katie Seals as Neighbor
- Kendall Green as Neighbor
- Laura Bryant as Neighbor
- Crystal the Monkey as Bobo (uncredited)

== Production ==
Filming for Terror Tract commenced on July 19, 1999 and concluded on August 21. Lance W. Dreesen and Clint Hutchison split directing duties, with Dreesen directing the "Make Me an Offer" and "Bobo" segments, while Hutchison directed "Nightmare" and "Come to Granny". Terror Tract was shot in Chatsworth, Los Angeles and Valencia, California.

== Release ==
Terror Tract premiered in the United States as a television movie for the USA Network on October 18, 2000, followed by a home video release on January 30, 2001.
