= Alex McArthur =

American actor (born 1957)

- Born: March 6, 1957 (age 69); Telford, Pennsylvania, U.S.
- Education: De Anza College; San Jose State University
- Occupation: Actor
- Years active: 1981 – present

Alex McArthur (born March 6, 1957) is an American actor of film and television.

== Early life and education ==
He was born in Telford, Pennsylvania, the son of Bruce, a contractor, and Dolores McArthur. He studied acting at De Anza College (Cupertino, California) and San Jose State University (San Jose, California), and worked as a bartender at the Studio 54 nightclub in New York City.

== Career ==
McArthur became known for portraying Charlie Reece in the crime-drama film Rampage (1987), and Duell McCall in the Western television-film series Desperado (1987), whose original screenplay was written by Elmore Leonard. He was nominated for Gemini Awards for Best Performance by an Actor in a Supporting Role, for the drama television film Woman on the Run: The Lawrencia Bembenek Story (1993).

He also appeared in the music video for Madonna's song "Papa Don't Preach", which was included in her The Immaculate Collection (1990) video compilation. In the video, he appears as Madonna's boyfriend and the father of her unborn child.

== Personal life ==
On December 21, 2019, McArthur's son, Jacob, was shot and killed in Oroville, California. A suspect was arrested on July 12, 2021.

== Filmography ==
=== Film ===
Year	Title	Role	Notes
1981	They All Laughed	Bellboy	Uncredited
1985	Desert Hearts	Walter	
1987	Rampage	Charlie Reece	
1989	Race for Glory	Cody Gifford	
1995	Perfect Alibi	Keith Bauers	
1996	Scene of the Crime	Richard Darling	
1997	Conspiracy Theory	Cynic	
1997	Kiss the Girls	Sikes	
1998	Devil in the Flesh	Peter Rinaldi	
1999	Running Home	Jack	
2000	Devil in the Flesh 2	Dr. John Sims	Uncredited
2001	Dischord	Recording Studio Executive	
2001	Route 666	Nick	
2001	Suspended Animation	Tom Kempton	
2003	Stealing Candy	Fred Dowd	
2003	The Commission	Roger Craig	
2004	Out for Blood	Jake Vincent	
2004	Em & Me	Michael Davenport	
2017	The Spearhead Effect	Fuller	
2021	Secret Agent Dingledorf and His Trusty Dog Splat	President	

=== Television ===
Year	Title	Role	Notes
1984	Scarecrow and Mrs. King	Antov	Episode: "Waiting for Godorsky"
1984	Riptide	Tony DeVito	Episode: "Where the Girls Are"
1984	With Intent to Kill	Bo Reinecker	Television film
1985	Command 5	Deputy Sam	Television film
1985	Silent Witness	Joey Caputo	Television film
1985	Crime of Innocence	Cory Yeager	Television film
1985	Hill Street Blues	Brent	Episode: "Oh, You Kid"
1985–1986	Knots Landing	Ken Forest	5 episodes
1987	Desperado	Duell McCall	Television film
1988	The Return of Desperado	Duell McCall	Television film
1988	Desperado: Avalanche at Devil's Ridge	Duell McCall	Television film
1989	L.A. Takedown	Patrick McLaren	Television film
1989	Desperado: The Outlaw Wars	Duell McCall	Television film
1989	Desperado: Badlands Justice	Duell McCall	Television film
1991	Shoot First: A Cop's Vengeance	Stephen Smith	Television film
1992	Drug Wars: The Cocaine Cartel	Tom Vaughan	2 episodes
1992	The Fifth Corner	Richard Braun	5 episodes
1993	Woman on the Run: The Lawrencia Bembenek Story	Nick Gugliatto	Television film
1994	The Road Home	Dickie Baineaux	6 episodes
1995	Ed McBain's 87th Precinct: Lightning	Detective Bert Kling	Television film
1995	Sharon's Secret	Bodin	Television film
1997	Touched by an Angel	Ed Bingham	Episode: "Full Moon"
1998	The Outer Limits	Josh Butler	Episode: "Josh"
1999	Dead Man's Gun	Johnny Coburn	Episode: "Sleepwalker"
1999	Charmed	Gabriel	Episode: "Which Prue Is It, Anyway?"
1999	Chicago Hope	Dwayne Haskell	Episode: "Kiss of Death"
2000	The Spiral Staircase	Steven	Television film
2003	Hunter	Alex Tanner	Episode: "Untouchable"
2007	Wraiths of Roanoke	John White	Television film
2009	Hydra	Vincent Camden	Television film
