= Wraiths of Roanoke =

2007 television film

- Genre: Horror; Mystery; Sci–Fi
- Written by: Rafael Jordan
- Directed by: Matt Codd
- Starring: Adrian Paul; Rhett Giles; Frida Farrell; George Calil; Alex McArthur
- Theme music composer: John Dickson
- Countries of origin: United States; Bulgaria
- Original language: English

Production
- Producers: Dana Dubovsky; Rafael Jordan; Mark L. Lester; Steven G. Kaplan
- Cinematography: Anton Bakarski
- Editor: Robin Russell
- Running time: 95 minutes
- Production companies: American World Pictures; Rainstorm Entertainment

Original release
- Network: Syfy
- Release: October 13, 2007

Wraiths of Roanoke (also known as Lost Colony or Lost Colony: The Legend of Roanoke), is a 2007 Syfy original supernatural period horror film, directed by Matt Codd and stars Adrian Paul, Frida Farrell, Rhett Giles, Michael Teh, and George Calil.

The film follows the 16th-century English settlers in America, who are besieged by wraiths. Ostensibly, it is based on the disappearance of the third Roanoke Colony. The film premiered on the Sci Fi Channel on October 13, 2007.

== Plot ==
The film opens with the Roanoke Colony, a 16th-century island colony in North Carolina. A settler is running towards the colony, but is locked out and killed by a ghostly figure. The only other settler left in the colony, frightened, locks himself in one of the buildings and hangs himself. English settlers arrive by ship at Roanoke Island with an Indian escort. When the settlers arrive, they find the colony abandoned by the previous occupants, except for one body. They find a corpse hanging from a rope inside a small building, with the door bolted from the inside. John White, the English governor sent with the settlers, dismisses this as an intimidation tactic by the Spanish. White is forced to return to England to gather supplies, and names his son-in-law Ananias Dare (Adrian Paul) interim governor, backed with the strong arm of George Howe (Rhett Giles). That evening, Ananias's pregnant wife Eleanor (Frida Farrell) is sleeping, when suddenly, she has a gruesome dream that her nightgown is covered in blood, with her baby taken from her womb. She runs out into the middle of the town square, and finds a ghost with her baby. She wakes up deeply shaken, and warns Ananias that it might be better for them to return to England. He dismisses this, but settlers begin dying in the woods one by one. Eleanor mysteriously gives birth prematurely, but the baby girl, whom they name Virginia, is born safely. Crops won't grow on the island's soil, and there are no animals in the forest. More settlers begin dying, and it soon becomes apparent that there is a supernatural presence on the island.

Eleanor continues to get disturbing dreams, and eventually the dreams reveal that the island was the location of a brutal execution of an innocent woman and a few other men by Vikings. Long before, a ship of Viking warriors suffered misfortune and blamed it on one of the women and a few of the men traveling on the ship with them. They took them to the island and tortured them to death, and because of this the souls of the evil Viking men and the other men and the single woman are still trapped on the island in a state between life and death. Ananias must work with Manteo, a local Croatan Indian chief, and his tribe to find a way to send the evil wraiths out of this world and into hell where they belong.

Thinking that the Indians were behind the killings of the settlers, one of the colonists leads an attack on the Indian village, only to be repelled and most of the men killed; for ruining the English's chances of gaining the Indians' trust, he is put in the stocks. Later that night, the wraiths suck out his soul and begin an attack on the colonists; they are fought back, but many colonists are killed. It is soon revealed that these wraiths feed on the souls of the living and are trying to kill Virginia because they require an innocent soul to pass on to the afterlife; it is also learned that their weaknesses are fire and water (water being a symbol of life). They are soon forced to devise a plan to defeat the wraiths; they set up a raft with a pile of wood and hay on it and wait for the moon to come. The wraiths arrive at night and due to a colonist panicking, they begin attacking them. In time, only Eleanor, Ananias, Virginia, and Howe are the only survivors. Eleanor attacks one of the wraiths in an attempt to save Ananias but is quickly killed. After a few minutes, Howe and Ananias are mortally wounded, with the latter luring the wraiths onto the raft with baby Virginia. As they close in on Ananias and Virginia, Howe launches a fire arrow onto the raft, setting it aflame; as the wraiths cannot cross water, they are forced to suffer. Ananias looks at Virginia one last time before setting her adrift and dying. Later on, Virginia is found by the Indians and is to be raised as one of their own; Manteo orders the tribe to bury the colonists and set their colony on fire.

== Cast ==
- Adrian Paul as Ananias Dare
- Rhett Giles as George Howe
- Frida Farrell as Eleanor Dare
- George Calil as Thomas Stevens
- Alex McArthur as John White
- Michael Teh as Manteo
- Doug Dearth as Gregory Hemphill
- Mari Mascaro as Elizabeth Viccars
- Suzette Kolaga as Emme Merrimoth
- Atanas Srebrev as Samuel Fillon
- Hristo Mitzkov as Ambrose Viccars
- Rafael Jordan as Christopher Harvie
- Jonas Talkington as William Stark
- Dessi Morales as Viking Woman
- Velislav Pavlov as Gaius Callis
- Ivo Simeonov as Lee Bamber
- George Zlatarev as Simon Fernandes
- Terence H. Winkless as Father Jacob

== Release ==
=== Home media ===
The film was released on DVD by Allumination on May 20, 2008. It was later released by Phase 4 Films on May 3, 2011, as a part of the second volume of their "Horror 4 Pack".

== Reception ==
Critical response for Wraiths of Roanoke has been mixed to negative. Dread Central rated it a score of two out of five, with the reviewer writing, "Wraiths of Roanoke is a lifeless yet inoffensive supernatural thriller with a historical bent to it. Well made yet still resoundingly uneventful; it’s got its head in the right place, it just doesn’t deliver much for your investment and tried my patience with all the waiting for the storyline to develop any traction". Justin Felix of DVD Talk awarded the film a similar score of two out of five, criticizing the film's cheap production values, acting, and special effects. Felix ended his review by stating that, although the film itself was poorly made, he considered it the best of the SyFy Channel's Made-for-TV films, and "mildly amusing".
