= Ordinary Miracles =

- DVD cover of Ordinary Miracles
- Genre: Drama
- Written by: Bud Schaetzle
- Directed by: Michael Switzer
- Starring: Jaclyn Smith; Lyndsy Fonseca; C. Thomas Howell
- Music by: James Dooley
- Country of origin: United States
- Original language: English

Production
- Producers: Kyle A. Clark; James Wilberger
- Cinematography: Amit Bhattacharya
- Editor: Cari Coughlin
- Running time: 95 minutes
- Production companies: Larry Levinson Productions; Hallmark Entertainment

Original release
- Network: Hallmark Channel
- Release: May 7, 2005

Ordinary Miracles is a 2005 American made-for-television drama film directed by Michael Switzer, written by Bud Schaetzle, and starring Jaclyn Smith, Lyndsy Fonseca, and C. Thomas Howell.

== Plot ==
Kay Woodbury (Jaclyn Smith) is a powerful and tough judge who has not spoken to her father since he tried to involve her in a scam. At her latest case, she deals with Sally Powell (Lyndsy Fonseca), a troubled and rebellious teenager who has been in several foster homes in her life. Feeling abandoned by her biological parents, she expresses her anger to anyone who tries to grow close to her. She is given up by her latest foster parents and, because there are not any replacements available, she is put in juvenile prison.

Sympathizing with her, Kay decides to take Sally into her home. Sally is initially reluctant to trust Kay and steals some of her jewelry, pawning it to make enough money to move to San Francisco with her boyfriend, who is a typical bad boy. However, she gets only $200. Kay and Sally soon grow to like each other, and Kay is particularly impressed by Sally's intelligence. Sally especially seems to enjoy chess. Sally tries to help Kay impress her ex-husband Davis (Corbin Bernsen), who is about to marry a much younger woman.

Meanwhile, Kay is going through Sally's files and discovers that her widowed biological father James (C. Thomas Howell) lives nearby and learns that his wife Miranda (Sarah Aldrich) had died. Kay contacts him for landscaping work and they soon become friends. Kay initially does not tell him about Sally. Later when Kay tells him, he argues with her and refuses to talk to his daughter, claiming that she would not accept him. Meanwhile, Sally has found her files and feels that Kay has betrayed her, as she always made clear that she has no interest in meeting her biological parents.

She steals more of Kay's jewelry and runs away with her boyfriend who, instead of simply selling the jewelry, robs the pawn shop and involves Sally without a warning. Upset, she demands that he drop her off, and he leaves without her. Sally returns home and is welcomed back by Kay. In the end, Sally decides to give her father a second chance as the three of them visit Miranda's grave.

== Cast ==
- Jaclyn Smith as Judge Kathryn Woodbury
- Lyndsy Fonseca as Sally Anne Powell
- C. Thomas Howell as James 'Jim' Powell
- Sarah Aldrich as Miranda Powell
- Corbin Bernsen as Davis Woodbury
- Erik Eidem as Pete Smalling
- Matty Castano as Danny Katsu
