= Silent Witness (1985 film) =

American television film

- DVD cover
- Genre: Drama
- Written by: Conrad Bromberg
- Directed by: Michael Miller
- Starring: Valerie Bertinelli; John Savage
- Theme music composer: Michael Hoenig
- Country of origin: United States
- Original language: English

Production
- Executive producers: Joe Wizan; Robert Greenwald
- Producer: Conrad Bromberg
- Production location: Pittsburgh
- Cinematography: Rexford L. Metz
- Editor: Robert Florio
- Running time: 100 minutes
- Production company: Robert Greenwald Productions

Original release
- Network: NBC
- Release: October 14, 1985

Silent Witness is a 1985 American television film starring Valerie Bertinelli and John Savage, directed by Michael Miller. It premiered on October 14, 1985 on NBC and is based on a true rape case in Massachusetts, the Cheryl Araujo case.

== Plot ==
Anna and Kevin Dunne are a newlywed couple who have recently moved to Pittsburgh. She is working in a discount department store, he is a garbage man. She leads a very happy life, until one night she, along with her husband, witnesses the kidnapping and rape of Patti Mullen from a bar. To her shock, she recognizes Michael, her brother-in-law, as one of the three kidnapper-rapists. The following days, Anna is dealing with a great dilemma. On the one hand, she sympathizes with Patti, a mentally unstable alcoholic who depends on witnesses, and she wants the rapists to be punished. On the other hand, she knows testifying against her brother-in-law will ruin the very close Dunne family.

Kevin advises Anna to remain quiet, which she initially does. She does visit Patti, though, who does not remember the kidnap-rape completely. Anna admits to her about the rape, after which Patti presses charges. Kevin and Anna avoid being summoned to testify, which puts a great deal of feeling guilt on Anna's shoulders. She knows that Patti, because of her alcoholic background, can rely only on Anna. During the highly publicized trial, Michael's lawyer Huffman does not have any trouble proving Patti is unreliable. Not much later, it is revealed Patti has committed suicide.

Now feeling extremely guilty, Anna is finally ready to testify. When Kevin tries to prevent her from doing so, she decides to leave him, telling him the case is driving them apart. Soon after the testimony, the Dunne family, with the exception of Kevin, starts committing perjury, telling in court Anna is holding a grudge against them for being teased because she, unlike Jean Dunne, hasn't ever got pregnant. They claim Kevin had an affair with a co-worker. They try to convince the judges that Anna's testimony is false and that she is only trying to take revenge against the family.

One night, Anna receives a visit from Joey Caputo, an old friend who left the bar shortly before the kidnapping and rape occurred. They have sex that night and the next day, Joey gives a false testimony in which he claims that Anna only cares about the publicity. Kevin notices how his relatives are destroying Anna and finally decides to denounce his family. He tries to convince Anna to run away with him, but she is determined to stay to serve justice. She goes back on stand, but once again, the defense is able to twist her words. In the end, Kevin comes to the rescue, finally giving a testimony. Afterwards, Anna and Kevin are reunited.

== Cast ==
- Valerie Bertinelli as Anna Abbatieri-Dunne
- John Savage as Kevin Dunne
- Chris Nash as Michael Dunne
- Melissa Leo as Patti Mullen
- Pat Corley as Brad Huffman
- Steven Williams as Ted Gunning
- Jacqueline Brookes as Ma Dunne
- Alex McArthur as Joey Caputo
- Katie McCombs as Jean Dunne
- Tom Signorelli as Detective Pileggi
- Billy Elmer as Carl Englehardt
- Barbara Russell as Customer #1

== See also ==
- List of American films of 1985
