= Jon Gordon =

American author and public speaker

- Education: Cornell University (BS); Emory University (MA)
- Occupation: Author
- Website: jongordon.com

Jon Gordon (born January 20, 1971) is an American author and speaker specializing in positive leadership, team culture, and resilience. He has opened a restaurant and bar in Buckhead, Atlanta and ran for Atlanta City Council.

Gordon is the author of more than 30 books, including multiple bestsellers. His work has been applied by organizations such as the University of Georgia's Bulldogs and Atlanta Falcons, among others. His work has been featured in publications such as The Wall Street Journal. He holds a Bachelor of Science in human ecology from Cornell University and a Master of Arts in teaching from Emory University.

== Books ==
Gordon has written several books published by Wiley including The Wall Street Journal best-seller The Energy Bus, The No Complaining Rule, and The Shark and the Goldfish.

Sam Presti describes Gordon's The Energy Bus is "a management book that shows readers how they can affect situations by how they frame them."

== Personal life ==
Gordon grew up in a Jewish-Italian family, but later converted to Christianity. Gordon studied Buddhism in his twenties.

Gordon grew up in Long Island, New York. Gordon and his sibling were raised by his Italian-Catholic step-father, and Jewish mother. He is a graduate of Cornell University.

== Bibliography ==
- Gordon, Jon (2007). The Energy Bus: 10 Rules to Fuel Your Life, Work, and Team with Positive Energy. Hoboken, NJ: Wiley. pp. 192 pages. ISBN 978-0470100288.
- Gordon, Jon (2008). The No Complaining Rule: Positive Ways to Deal with Negativity at Work. Hoboken, NJ: Wiley. pp. 176 pages. ISBN 978-0470279496.
- Gordon, Jon (2009). Training Camp: What the Best Do Better than Everyone Else. Hoboken, NJ: Wiley. pp. 176 pages. ISBN 978-0470462089.
- Gordon, Jon (2009). The Shark and the Goldfish: Positive Ways to Thrive During Waves of Change. Hoboken, NJ: Wiley. pp. 112 pages. ISBN 978-0470503607.
