= Oliver Stritzel =

German actor (born 1957)

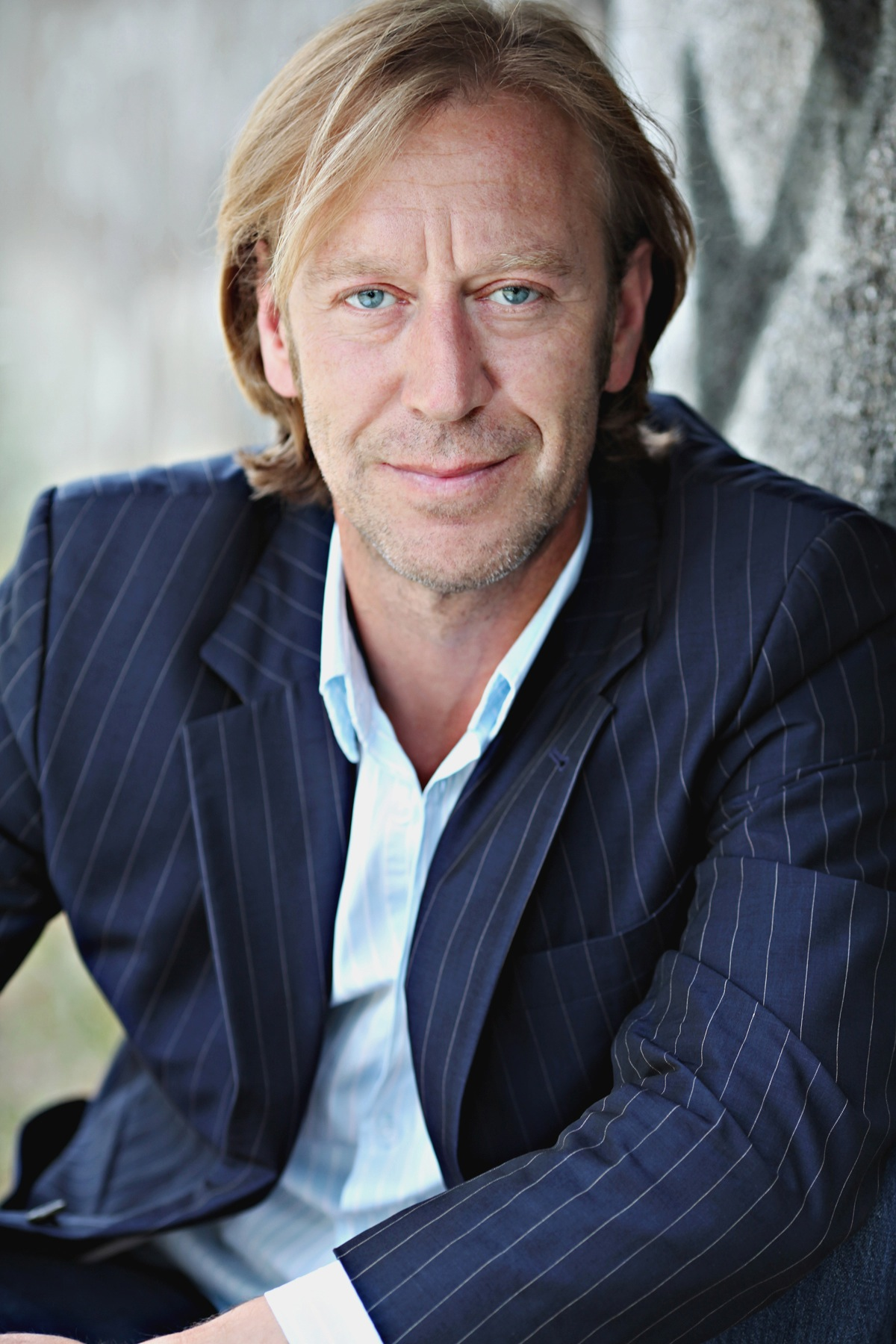
Sritzel in 2010

Oliver Stritzel (born 9 March 1957) is a German actor.

== Career ==
Born in Berlin, Stritzel appeared in the 1981 film Das Boot and the same year began a stage career, appearing with the Freie Volksbühne in Berlin and later with the Bonn City Theatre. As an actor, he has appeared in many crime dramas; his recurring role of Kalle Küppers on the long-running television series Polizeiruf 110 brought him fame and an Adolf Grimme Prize in 1996. In 2016 he played Cornel Brinkley in Der Schatz im Silbersee at the Karl May Festival in Bad Segeberg.

Stritzel has also had an extensive career as a voice and dub actor.

== Selected roles ==
=== Acting ===
- Das Boot (1981) – Schwalle
- The Man on the Wall (1982) – Krause
- Bolero (1983)
- Moving Targets (1984) – Zorro
- Tango im Bauch (1985) – Sepp
- Schleuse 17 (1985)
- Das Mädchen mit den Feuerzeugen (1987) – bar customer
- Beule (1988) – Fred Frenzel
- Race for Glory (1989) – Klaus Kroetter
- Blutspur in den Osten (1995) – Hunzinger
- Polizeiruf 110 (1995–2004) – Kalle Küppers
- Lea (1996) – Doctor
- Unser fremdes Kind (1998) – Horst Schneider
- Polizeiruf 110 – Kurschatten (2001)
- Hotte in Paradise (2002, TV film) – Detta
- Polizeiruf 110 – Rosentod (2004)
- Downfall (2004) – Johannes Hentschel
- Oktoberfest (2005) – Officer Voight
- Polizeiruf 110 – Schneewittchen (2006)
- The Beheaded Rooster (2007) – Eugen Goldschmidt
- Wechselspiel (2013) – Joseph Hauswaldt

=== Television animation ===
- Hellsing (Alexander Anderson (Nachi Nozawa))

=== Original video animation ===
- Final Fantasy VII Advent Children (Rude (Taiten Kusunoki))

=== Theatrical animation ===
- A Bug's Life (Dim (Brad Garrett))
- Hercules (Nessus the Centaur (Jim Cummings))
- Home on the Range (Rico (Charles Dennis))
- Ice Age: The Meltdown (The Lone Gunslinger (Will Arnett))
- Kung Fu Panda 3 (Kai (J.K. Simmons))
- The Little Mermaid (Flotsam and Jetsam (Paddi Edwards))
- Mulan (Shan Yu (Miguel Ferrer))
- Steamboy (Technician)
- Treasure Planet (Scroop (Michael Wincott))
- Tayo the Little Bus (Poco (Kevin Aichelle))
- Wreck-It Ralph (General Hologram (Dennis Haysbert))
- Zootopia (Chief Bogo (Idris Elba))

=== Live action dubbing ===
- Flawless (Rusty Zimmerman (Philip Seymour Hoffman))
- Flubber (Smith (Clancy Brown))
- Lost (Kelvin Joe Inman (Clancy Brown))
- Magnolia (Phil Parma (Philip Seymour Hoffman))
- Punch-Drunk Love (Dean Trumbell (Philip Seymour Hoffman))
- Spawn (Spawn (Michael Jai White))
- Street Fighter (M. Bison (Raúl Juliá))
- The Talented Mr. Ripley (Freddie Miles (Philip Seymour Hoffman))
- V for Vendetta (V (Hugo Weaving))

=== Voice filmography ===
- Asterix Conquers America – Fulliautomatix (uncredited) (German dub)
