= Harlan Roulette =

- Justified episode
- Episode no.: Season 3 Episode 3
- Directed by: Jon Avnet
- Written by: Dave Andron
- Cinematography by: Francis Kenny
- Editing by: Steve Polivka
- Original air date: January 31, 2012
- Running time: 41 minutes

Guest appearances
- Raymond J. Barry as Arlo Givens; Jeremy Davies as Dickie Bennett; Jere Burns as Wynn Duffy; Damon Herriman as Dewey Crowe; Eric Ladin as Wally Beckett; James LeGros as Wade Messer; David Meunier as Johnny Crowder; Peter Murnik as Trooper Tom Bergen; Kevin Rankin as Derek "Devil" Lennox; Todd Stashwick as Ash Murphy; Pruitt Taylor Vince as Glen Fogle; Mike Foy as J.T.; Demetrius Grosse as Errol; Cleavon R. McClendon III as Bernard; Mykelti Williamson as Ellstin Limehouse; Neal McDonough as Robert Quarles

Episode chronology
← Previous "Cut Ties"	Next → "The Devil You Know"
- Justified (season 3)

"Harlan Roulette" is the third episode of the third season of the American Neo-Western television series Justified. It is the 29th overall episode of the series and was written by co-executive producer Dave Andron and directed by Jon Avnet. It originally aired on FX on January 31, 2012.

The series is based on Elmore Leonard's stories about the character Raylan Givens, particularly "Fire in the Hole", which serves as the basis for the episode. The series follows Raylan Givens, a tough deputy U.S. Marshal enforcing his own brand of justice. The series revolves around the inhabitants and culture in the Appalachian Mountains area of eastern Kentucky, specifically Harlan County where many of the main characters grew up. In the episode, Raylan goes after a ruthless pawn shop owner/Oxy dealer to work his way up the Dixie Mafia food chain. Meanwhile, Boyd seeks to repair a relationship while Dickie is extorted by a guard in prison. Despite being credited, Nick Searcy, Jacob Pitts and Erica Tazel do not appear in the episode.

According to Nielsen Media Research, the episode was seen by an estimated 2.71 million household viewers and gained a 1.1 ratings share among adults aged 18–49. The episode received very positive reviews from critics, who praised the dialogue, pace, acting and building momentum for the season.

== Plot ==
Ava (Joelle Carter) visits Limehouse (Mykelti Williamson) at one of his barbecue parties. She and Limehouse then drive to a bridge to meet with Boyd (Walton Goggins) and his crew. Boyd tries to negotiate splitting Mags' money if he kills Dickie but Limehouse does not even confirm he has the money, mocking him for his failure of the marijuana business. Limehouse leaves and Boyd attacks Devil (Kevin Rankin) for failing to burn the marijuana.

Raylan (Timothy Olyphant) receives a tip that may lead to Wade Messer (James LeGros). Wade tries to escape in a truck with the help of a colleague, J.T. (Mike Foy) but Raylan notices him from a roadblock. Wade and J.T. try to escape but the truck crashes. Raylan arrives at the truck but Wade escapes. In prison, Dickie (Jeremy Davies) is approached by a guard, Ash Murphy (Todd Stashwick), who heard his conversation with Boyd and is interested in Mags' money. Dickie denies knowledge but claims that if he was out of prison, he would help him. Murphy then tells him he will be released soon.

Trooper Tom Bergen (Peter Murnik) tells Raylan that the truck was associated with the Dixie Mafia. He also tells him about a dealer involved in Oxy that hires drug addicts to steal. Wade flees to a pawn shop, meeting with the owner Glen Fogle (Pruitt Taylor Vince) and Wally Beckett (Eric Ladin). Beckett takes J.T. to the pawn shop, as Fogle suspects that he talked with the police. Seizing on J.T.'s drug addiction, he forces him to play Russian roulette in exchange for Oxy. J.T. survives twice, but he wets himself. He tries to kill Fogle with the gun but finds that he didn't put a bullet in the gun. Fogle then puts in a bullet and kills J.T., after which Wade and Beckett are ordered to bury his corpse.

Duffy (Jere Burns) visits Quarles (Neal McDonough) in his new house, which he intends to use as a base of operations for his illegal activities. Raylan visits the pawn shop, asking for J.T. and Wade but Fogle denies any knowledge and refuses to let him inspect the shop without a warrant. When Raylan makes a snarky remark about hiding in the shop, Fogle suspects that he knows. He contacts Duffy and Quarles, both tell him to kill Raylan although they are skeptical that he will do it. But Fogle blackmails Wade to do it himself at his house, as Raylan told him that Wade was a fugitive.

Wanting to fix his relationship with Johnny (David Meunier), Boyd and his crew go to Johnny's bar that belongs to another person. Boyd threatens the owner to hand over the ownership as he took it while Johnny was hospitalized. The owner also has henchmen at the bar, targeting their guns at them. Johnny enters, threatening to have more of his crew arrive and kill him. Feeling overrun, the owner is forced to hand over the ownership to Boyd. Boyd tells Devil that he intends to hire more men for his cause: controlling the whole Harlan area.

Wade invites Raylan to his house, pretending to have vital information. However, Raylan knows Wade intends to kill him and forces him to lie to Fogle, telling him he succeeded but was wounded in the progress. Fogle and Beckett arrive at the house, where they are greeted by Raylan. In order to save themselves, Fogle offers to confess about many criminals in Frankfort, including Duffy. But Beckett is furious at the deal and confesses that Fogle killed J.T., offering to turn himself in if Raylan kills Fogle. Fogle and Beckett trade insults and both end up shooting each other, killing themselves.

Quarles and Duffy discuss in Duffy's car when Raylan appears thanks to Fogle's tip. He reminds Duffy of their incoming conversation, telling him that it is happening now. He attacks Duffy, telling him he knows he hired Fogle to kill him and is responsible for Arnett's disappearance. Instead of shooting him, he just leaves a bullet, telling him "next one's coming faster". Quarles tries to intimidate Raylan but is unsuccessful. Raylan takes a picture of Quarles and leaves the trailer.

== Production ==
=== Development ===
In January 2012, it was reported that the second episode of the third season would be titled "Harlan Roulette", and was to be directed by Jon Avnet and written by co-executive producer Dave Andron.

=== Writing ===
The line that Raylan tells to Wade Messer about entering uninvited to the house is a callback to the first episode, establishing the theme of the season as "crossing the line."

Series developer Graham Yost explained the decision to keep Wade Messer and Dewey Crowe alive despite their many missteps, "a lot of it has to do with just us seeing the performance. We had so much fun with Damon Herriman playing Dewey on the pilot. We just thought it'd be cool to bring him back. We always want to make sure when we use him that we remind ourselves and the audience that he's a bad guy capable of bad stuff, but at the same time, not lose sight of the Elmore Leonard humor that's involved with a character like that." Yost revealed that inspiration for the Oxy storyline came from Harlan citizens, who viewed Oxy as "the great destroyer" as well as hearing from Kentucky about pill mills, "So we knew as a subject area we wanted to explore it. And then we heard about this possible scam of mobile Oxy clinics where you'd set up doctors to be quasi legal, and if the heat got too hot, you would just move."

Yost previously referred Quarles as the "Carpetbagger". He further elaborated, "in our twisted Justified world, the natural resource down there is Oxy addicts. We just thought that becomes an Elmore-like scam. Elmore's bad guys are always looking for that little gap, that little thing that no one else has tried, that makes some kind of sense." Regarding the final scene where he smiled when Raylan took a picture of him, "that was something I thought of. I thought it would be nice if Raylan had a picture of him, so that then in subsequent episodes he could maybe find out more about him as their two stories start to come together. At this point, at the end of episode 3, Raylan doesn't know that Quarles is going to be his main adversary this season."

Questioned about the man that Quarles had bound and gagged in the house, Yost said, "we're not supposed to know who that guy is", explaining that the man would be revealed in the subsequent episodes. "Guy Walks into a Bar" revealed the identity of the man as Brady Hughes.

Raylan's line when he threatens Duffy, "the next one's coming faster", was based on a story that Yost claims to have heard on The Tonight Show Starring Johnny Carson. The line would eventually become a favorite among critics and fans of the series.

=== Casting ===
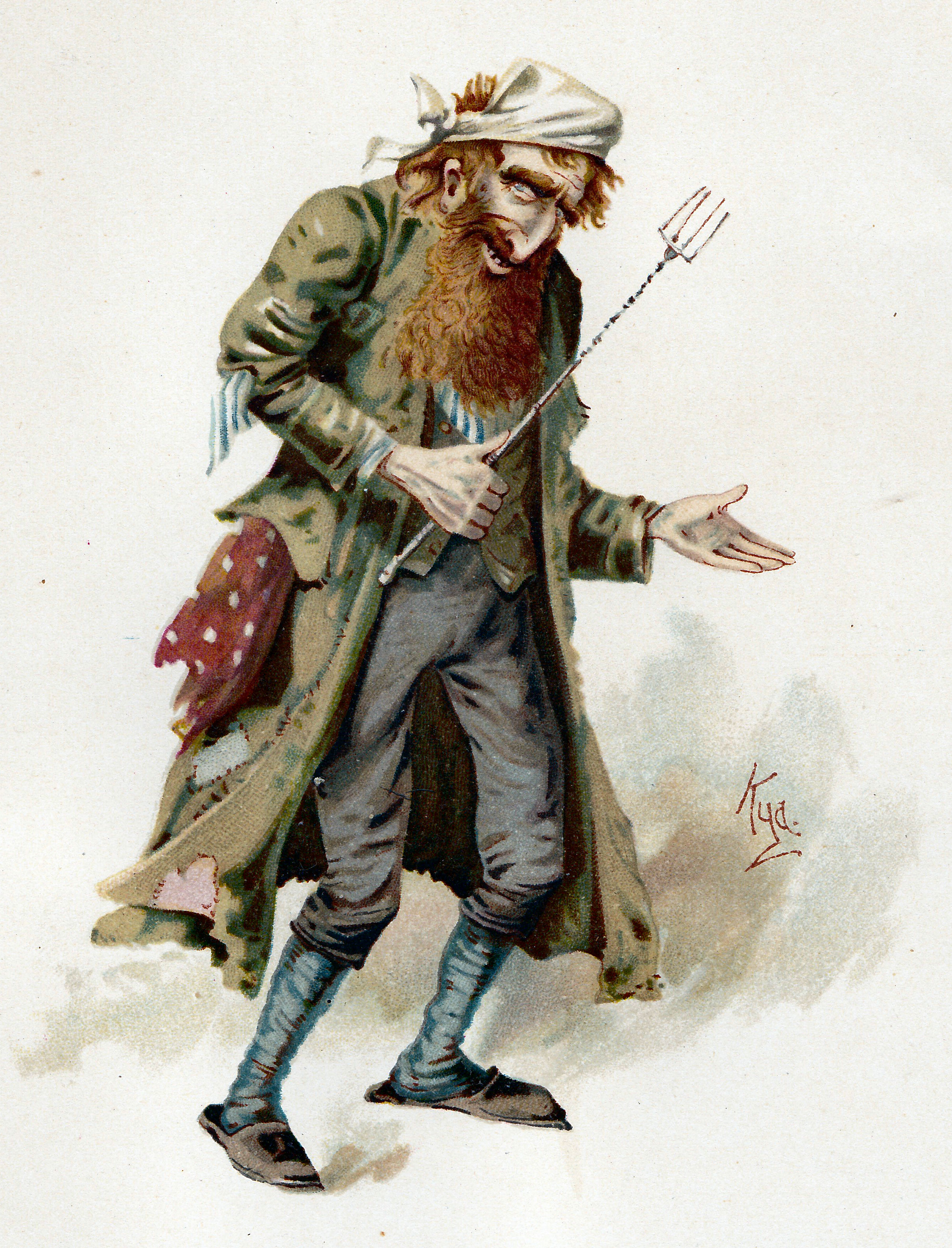
Series developer Graham Yost viewed Glen Fogle as a "modern-day Fagin", a character in Oliver Twist.

In November 2011, Pruitt Taylor Vince was announced to play a guest role in the episode as Glen Fogle, "a 'modern-day Fagin', Fogle deals in stolen goods and pays his hired thieves with painkillers." Yost added, "We called him Fagin in our breaking of the story because we thought of him as this Oliver Twist-like character who has these addicts going out and robbing for him. We just wanted to see, like Fagin or Sikes to an extent, how bad he could be." For his death scene, Yost expressed sadness at killing him, "That's kinda hard. But at the same time, he's so wonderful, it just makes the episode work."

== Reception ==
=== Viewers ===
In its original American broadcast, "Harlan Roulette" was seen by an estimated 2.71 million household viewers and gained a 1.1 ratings share among adults aged 18–49, according to Nielsen Media Research. This means that 1.1 percent of all households with televisions watched the episode. This was steady in viewership from the previous episode, which was watched by 2.71 million viewers with a 0.9 in the 18-49 demographics.

=== Critical reviews ===
"Harlan Roulette" received very positive reviews from critics. Seth Amitin of IGN gave the episode a "great" 8.5 out of 10 and wrote, "The writing has taken a very sharp turn toward excellent. This is way better than I remember it being. The dialogue is crisp and has even taken on a funnier edge. The characters seem a little more well-rounded, too (think about Dickie with a knife to his throat vs. Dickie talking to the prison guard). Boyd's vocabulary has improved. This is going to be a very fun season."

Scott Tobias of The A.V. Club gave the episode an "A−" grade and wrote, "This week, we saw multiple parties getting prepared for business in Harlan — and in the Darwinian scramble for territory, the clearest, most organized thinkers win out and the merely organizized are left to the wolves. As with last season, the show isn't wasting much time bringing order to its own universe." James Queally of The Star-Ledger wrote, "I'm afraid I don't have a whole lot else to say about 'Harlan Roulette'. Justified can sometimes be a tough show to review, because Graham Yost and company don't really do a whole hell of a lot wrong. They also haven't done a whole hell of a lot different over the past 16 or so episodes (since the beginning of Season 2). That's perfectly fine by me, the show works. There are only so many ways I can tell you it's awesome. Perhaps as we get to know a little more about some of the new faces around Harlan, I'll be a little more loquacious."

Alan Sepinwall of HitFix wrote, "Strong episode, and, like last week, an example of how the show has become much better at mixing serialized and standalone. Much as I like most of the actors involved in the Fogel story (more on them in a minute), that plot alone wouldn't have been interesting enough to carry a full hour. But as one story of many – and tied back in to the larger Dixie Mafia plot – it worked out just splendidly." Luke de Smet of Slant Magazine wrote, "With 'Harlan Roulette', the full potential of season three is starting to show itself. The coming mayhem is fairly clear, as Raylan, Boyd, Limehouse, Quarles, and even Dickie all move slowly toward each other. Something is certainly going to change in Harlan, but the only way to find out if that change will be any good is to pull the trigger and find out."

Ben Lee of Digital Spy wrote, "Another week, another awesome episode of Justified." Joe Reid of Vulture wrote, "But I do know television, and my years of watching it have taught me that the most dangerous time for both criminals and law enforcement is when there's a power vacuum at the top of the criminal food chain. And that's clearly where we're at this week on Justified."

Todd VanDerWerff of Los Angeles Times wrote, "The more that the show is able to introduce compelling figures and the more it's able to do fascinating things with people we already know, the healthier it will be, and if 'Harlan Roulette' is any indication, this show is very healthy indeed." Dan Forcella of TV Fanatic gave the episode a perfect 5 star rating out of 5 and wrote, "What Justified has become so wonderful at recently is not only mixing serialization with episodic stories so well, but also creating episodic plots that - in and of themselves - are integral to the seasonal arc. That was never more evident than in 'Harlan Roulette'." Jack McKinney of Paste gave the episode a 8.5 rating out of 10 and wrote, "This week's episode was about two things, storytelling and what the stories we choose say about the teller. There were (at least) three story monologues tonight, and each one was illuminating not only in showing where each storyteller thinks they fall on the spectrum of right and wrong, but also how mistaken they may be about that. Often our best stories are the ones we tell ourselves."
