= Lynda Kay =

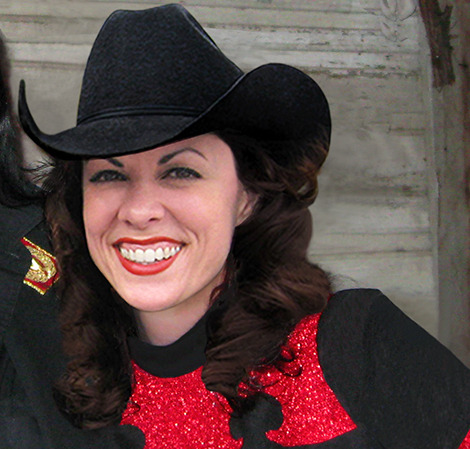
- Born: Dallas, Texas, United States
- Occupations: Musician; singer-songwriter
- Years active: 1995–present
- Musical career
- Genres: Country Pop Rock
- Instruments: Vocals; guitar; sampler; suitcase kickdrum
- Website: lyndakay.com

Lynda Kay Parker, known as Lynda Kay, is an American contralto singer, songwriter, guitarist, actor and business owner. Born in Dallas, Texas, she began her entertainment career appearing in stage plays and commercials. Lynda Kay is now a professional musician and an official endorsee of Gretsch guitars.

== Personal life ==
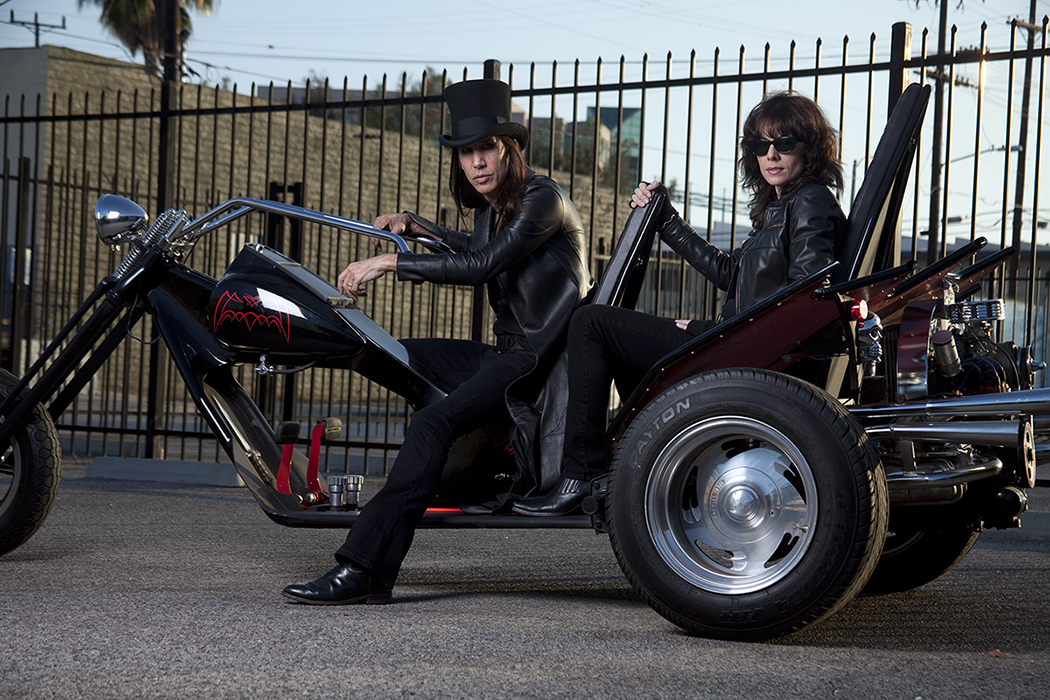
Lynda Kay with husband Jonny Coffin

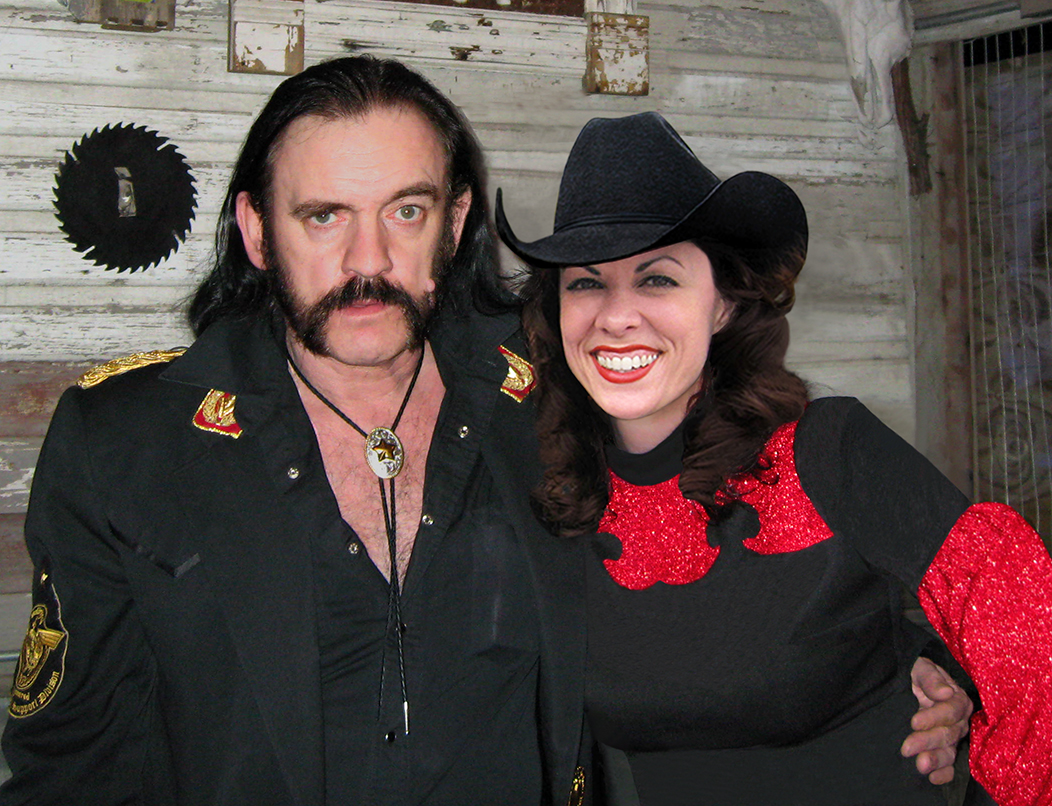
Lynda Kay with Lemmy

Lynda Kay is married to Jonny Coffin, founder of guitar case company Coffin Case. Together, they own the Coffin and Vampira brands. Jonny Coffin started Coffin Case in his garage in 1996, first creating one for himself and subsequently receiving requests for custom cases by Slash, Keith Richards, and Kirk Hammet, among others. The consumer line of Coffin Case began in 2000 and continues to this day.

== Education ==
In 1990, Lynda Kay earned her Bachelor of Arts from Texas Tech University in Lubbock, Texas studying Political Science and Theater Arts, and returned a year after graduation to attend Texas Tech School of Law receiving her Juris Doctor in 1994.

== Career ==
Lynda Kay's most visible television appearance was in the fall of 2019, when she co-starred as herself in season 3 of the Amazon Prime series Goliath, starring Billy Bob Thornton. Her performance features songs from her double album Lynda Kay: Black & Gold, which came out on October 4, 2019. The album's first single is a never-before-released duet written and performed by Lynda Kay and Lemmy Kilmister (of Motörhead) entitled "The Mask.”

Before pursuing a career in music, Lynda Kay had a genuine interest in using her legal education to work as an undercover FBI agent. However, she ultimately decided to pursue her comedic and theatrical leanings.

An opportunity to appear in the CBS Series JAG brought Lynda Kay to Hollywood, and thereafter she was cast in numerous advertisements for such campaigns as Bell Telephone, Dell Computers, and Metallica. In 2000, Lynda Kay was cast in the dark cult comedy/horror anthology film Terror Tract which starred John Ritter, Bryan Cranston, Brenda Strong, and Will Estes.

After an audition for a musical when the casting directors informed her she was not right for the role, but asked her to sing another song, Lynda Kay took that as a sign she should focus on music. Consequently, she created a cabaret show that evolved into a 3-year residency at the Atlas Supper Club (a venue behind the Wiltern Theater) with a 6-piece band requiring her to change costumes and characters 7–8 times a performance.

By 2003, Lynda Kay's musical style was shifting back to her country roots, and she became a one-woman band calling herself the Lonesome Stranger. She taught herself guitar, began writing songs, created her signature suitcase kickdrum, and earned income busking on Venice Beach.

After a chance meeting at the Lava Lounge, Lynda Kay formed the Lonesome Spurs with rockabilly guitarist Danny B. Harvey, who also played in The Headcat with Lemmy and drummer Slim Jim Phantom (of The Stray Cats). Lonesome Spurs released their self-titled debut album on Cleopatra Records’ subsidiary Rock-A-Billy Records in 2006 and the duo played over 900 shows by the time they disbanded in 2008 when Harvey relocated to Austin, Texas. During this time, Lynda Kay also recorded background vocals for Wanda Jackson's I Remember Elvis album, notably for the song "Give Me the Right.”

Lynda Kay released her debut solo album, Dream My Darling, with 12 original songs (later "Jack & Coke" was added as a bonus track) in 2009, and it included a duet with Billy Bob Thornton titled "All I Ever Wanted." The album was co-produced by her husband Jonny Coffin and Mike Butler, former guitarist from Billy Bob Thornton's band The Boxmasters.

In 2012, Lynda Kay appeared as herself in the FX series Justified in Season 3, Episode 8, "Watching the Detectives", performing her song "Jack & Coke." The series licensed six of Lynda Kay's compositions, and two of her songs are featured on the Justified soundtrack CD on Sony Madison Gate Records.

Lynda Kay began working with Ultra-Lounge producer Brad Benedict in 2011, and in 2013 they released an EP titled The Allure of Lynda Kay recorded at Capitol Studios. During this time, Lynda Kay had ongoing Hollywood residencies at noted filming location of the movie Swingers, Three Clubs, and David Arquette's club Bootsy Bellows. In 2012, Los Angeles Magazine named Lynda Kay's performance at Bootsy Bellows the Best Concert of the Year.

In 2014 Lynda Kay recorded and released a duet with Bela B, the drummer of the pioneering German punk band Die Ärzte, titled "My Soul/Dein Herz" on his album Bye with Bela B & Smokestack Lightnin´ co-starring Peta Devlin and Walter Broes, which reached No. 5 in Billboard Germany on April 26, 2014. Lynda Kay joined Bela B, Peta Devlin, and Smokestack Lightnin’ on their 2014 summer tour of Germany and Austria.

Lynda Kay released the Spanish version of her album Dream My Darling in 2017 on Dreamphonic Records, titled Sueña Mi Amor, with translations by Alfonso Pinzon.

Lynda Kay has performed numerous weddings and is a non-denominational licensed wedding officiant in the State of California known as Reverend Lynda Kay Parker. She is also a vocal supporter of equal rights and LGBTQ issues.

== Discography ==
- Lonesome Spurs (2006)
- Dream My Darling (2009)
- The Allure of Lynda Kay (2013)
- Sueña Mi Amor (2017)
- Black & Gold (2019)
