= Julie Pacino =

American filmmaker

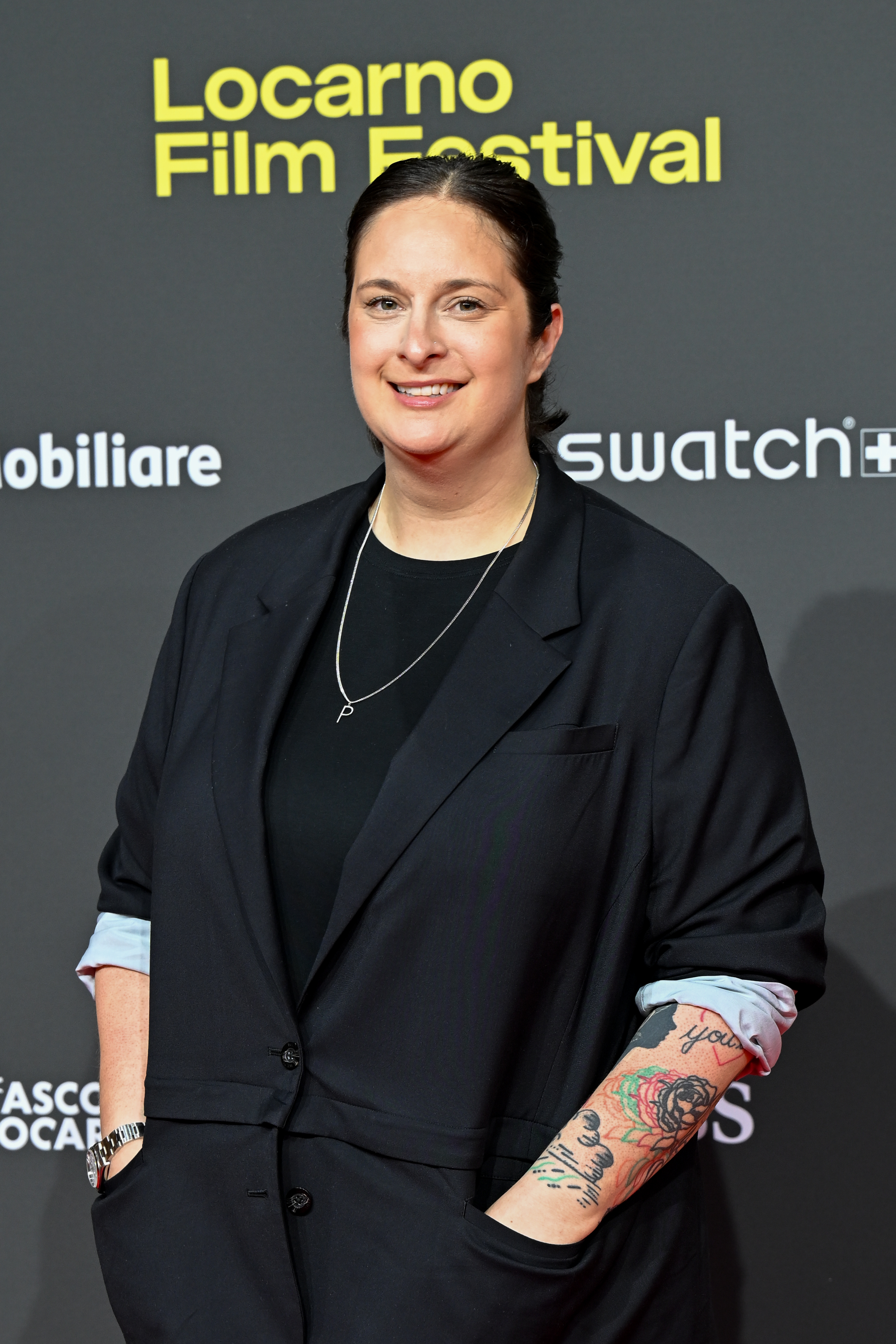
- At the Locarno Film Festival, August 2025
- Born: Julie Marie Pacino; October 16, 1989 (age 37); New York City, U.S.
- Occupations: Director; producer
- Father: Al Pacino

Julie Marie Pacino (/pəˈtʃiːnoʊ/ pə-CHEE-noh; Italian: [paˈtʃiːno]; born October 16, 1989) is an American filmmaker, whose debut film as a director, I Live Here Now, premiered in 2025.

The daughter of actor Al Pacino and acting teacher Jan Tarrant, she studied filmmaking at the New York Film Academy, and launched the film studio Poverty Row Entertainment with filmmaker Jennifer DeLia. Her first credit as a producer was on DeLia's 2013 film Billy Bates. She subsequently worked as a producer of both feature and short films, and as a director of short films, and founded another production company, Tiny Apples, in 2020.

I Live Here Now premiered at the 29th Fantasia International Film Festival.

== Personal life ==
Pacino was born in Queens, New York City to Italian-American actor Al Pacino and acting coach Jan Tarrant. She grew up in Tappan, New York, attending Tappan Zee High School in Orangeburg, New York.

In 2021 she entered a relationship with Israeli tennis player Adi Spiegelman.
