= Jennifer DeLia =

American screenwriter

Jennifer Renée DeLia (born September 30, 1979) is an American screenwriter, director, actress, artist and humanitarian. She is currently based in lower Manhattan where she operates her production company Poverty Row Entertainment.

== Life ==
DeLia has worked for many years in the film industry in physical production on major feature films such as Oliver Stone’s World Trade Center (Nicolas Cage and Maggie Gyllenhaal) and internationally acclaimed director Wong Kar Wai's My Blueberry Nights (Norah Jones, Jude Law, Natalie Portman). DeLia secured financing and was an Associate Producer on Explicit Ills directed by Mark Webber (Rosario Dawson, Lou Taylor Pucci, Paul Dano) which won the Audience Award at South by Southwest in 2008 and was theatrically released by Peace Arch. She secured financing and line produced the award-winning feature documentary Slingshot Hip Hop that premiered at Sundance in 2008. DeLia produced and acted in the short film Abracadabra, directed by Julie Pacino (eldest daughter of actor Al Pacino). The short screened in several international cities, including Cannes, Hollywood and São Paulo.

As a director, DeLia has made various short format projects her first being the short film, I Am an Island, in 2008. I Am an Island is based on her father's memoirs and stars James Wirt, Margherita Missoni and Josephine de La Baume, and played in Cannes, London, New York and Los Angeles. DeLia studied acting intensively at Sanford Meisner's Neighborhood Playhouse in New York.

DeLia's obsessive curiosity about art and pop culture and the two's symbiotic relationship lead her to David LaChapelle and Berlin in 2006. She acquired sponsorship for the biggest art exhibition celebration Berlin could remember seeing. The celebration hosted 4,000 people in East Berlin's Rodeo Club, a 19th-century dome building with DJ Dmitry (Deee-Lite) performing before a tower of love dolls. LaChapelle had for the first time premiered inside the Helmut Newton Foundation in West Berlin.

Before Berlin, DeLia spent three months in Brazil with the youth in the slums, researching the sex trade, and bringing LaChapelle's social documentary Rize to the correlating communities in Brazil. Her work there brought about incredible alliances that continue to grow – one being an exchange with MV Bill's (biggest rapper and social activist from Cidade de Deus in Rio de Janeiro) youth organization CUFA and the Los Angeles-based children from Rize.

Following Berlin, DeLia produced the fashion line of Traver Rains and Richie Rich, Heatherette's biggest Fashion Week After-Party to date. In attendance, Danity Kane, Nick Cannon, Britney Spears, Cuba Gooding Jr, and more, at the Roseland Ballroom in New York.

The collection of DeLia's aforementioned experiences is what breathes life into her directorial first feature film, Billy Bates. This film is more than a film as it is a multi–layered experience about the cycle of art and life, allowing the viewer to travel authentically and organically through the path of the artist process. As the unseen interviewer in the film, she is asking Billy the probing questions that guide him through this deeply emotional journey, all the while she is learning about her self and her own questions dealing with
