= List of Justified episodes =

Justified is an American neo-Western television series which premiered March 16, 2010, on FX. The series was developed for television by Graham Yost, based on a series of novels and short stories by Elmore Leonard, and stars Timothy Olyphant as Deputy U.S. Marshal Raylan Givens. The series aired 78 episodes over six seasons and concluded on April 14, 2015. A sequel series, titled Justified: City Primeval, premiered on FX on July 18, 2023.

== Series overview ==
Season	Episodes	Originally released		Average viewers (millions)
Season	Episodes	First released	Last released	Average viewers (millions)
1	13	March 16, 2010	June 8, 2010	2.42
2	13	February 9, 2011	May 4, 2011	2.65
3	13	January 17, 2012	April 10, 2012	2.39
4	13	January 8, 2013	April 2, 2013	2.43
5	13	January 7, 2014	April 8, 2014	2.29
6	13	January 20, 2015	April 14, 2015	1.86
City Primeval	8	July 18, 2023	August 29, 2023	0.625

== Episodes ==
=== Season 1 (2010) ===
No. overall	No. in season	Title	Directed by	Written by	Original release date	US viewers (millions)
1	1	"Fire in the Hole"	Michael Dinner	Teleplay by : Graham Yost	March 16, 2010	4.16
2	2	"Riverbrook"	Michael Dinner	Graham Yost	March 23, 2010	3.53
3	3	"Fixer"	Fred Keller	Benjamin Cavell	March 30, 2010	2.31
4	4	"Long in the Tooth"	Adam Arkin	Chris Provenzano	April 6, 2010	2.10
5	5	"The Lord of War and Thunder"	Jon Avnet	Gary Lennon	April 13, 2010	2.41
6	6	"The Collection"	Rod Holcomb	Graham Yost	April 20, 2010	2.06
7	7	"Blind Spot"	Michael Watkins	Wendy Calhoun	April 27, 2010	2.26
8	8	"Blowback"	Jon Avnet	Benjamin Cavell	May 4, 2010	2.46
9	9	"Hatless"	Peter Werner	Dave Andron	May 11, 2010	2.09
10	10	"The Hammer"	John Dahl	Fred Golan & Chris Provenzano	May 18, 2010	2.08
11	11	"Veterans"	Tony Goldwyn	Benjamin Daniel Lobato	May 25, 2010	1.81
12	12	"Fathers and Sons"	Michael Katleman	Dave Andron	June 1, 2010	2.13
13	13	"Bulletville"	Adam Arkin	Fred Golan	June 8, 2010	2.03

=== Season 2 (2011) ===
No. overall	No. in season	Title	Directed by	Written by	Original release date	US viewers (millions)
14	1	"The Moonshine War"	Adam Arkin	Story by : Elmore Leonard & Graham Yost; Teleplay by : Graham Yost	February 9, 2011	3.47
15	2	"The Life Inside"	Jon Avnet	Benjamin Cavell	February 16, 2011	2.41
16	3	"The I of the Storm"	Peter Werner	Dave Andron	February 23, 2011	2.59
17	4	"For Blood or Money"	John Dahl	Wendy Calhoun	March 2, 2011	2.64
18	5	"Cottonmouth"	Michael Watkins	Taylor Elmore	March 9, 2011	2.71
19	6	"Blaze of Glory"	Jon Avnet	Benjamin Cavell	March 16, 2011	2.37
20	7	"Save My Love"	Jon Avnet	Graham Yost	March 23, 2011	2.22
21	8	"The Spoil"	Michael Watkins	Story by : Elmore Leonard & Dave Andron; Teleplay by : Dave Andron	March 30, 2011	2.64
22	9	"Brother's Keeper"	Tony Goldwyn	Taylor Elmore	April 6, 2011	2.79
23	10	"Debts and Accounts"	John David Coles	Chris Provenzano	April 13, 2011	2.50
24	11	"Full Commitment"	Peter Werner	Benjamin Cavell	April 20, 2011	2.50
25	12	"Reckoning"	Adam Arkin	Dave Andron	April 27, 2011	2.92
26	13	"Bloody Harlan"	Michael Dinner	Fred Golan	May 4, 2011	2.68

=== Season 3 (2012) ===
No. overall	No. in season	Title	Directed by	Written by	Original release date	US viewers (millions)
27	1	"The Gunfighter"	Michael Dinner	Graham Yost & Fred Golan	January 17, 2012	3.07
28	2	"Cut Ties"	Michael Watkins	Benjamin Cavell	January 24, 2012	2.71
29	3	"Harlan Roulette"	Jon Avnet	Dave Andron	January 31, 2012	2.71
30	4	"The Devil You Know"	Dean Parisot	Taylor Elmore	February 7, 2012	2.21
31	5	"Thick as Mud"	Adam Arkin	Story by : Elmore Leonard & Jon Worley; Teleplay by : Jon Worley & Benjamin Cavell	February 14, 2012	2.13
32	6	"When the Guns Come Out"	Don Kurt	Story by : Nichelle Tramble Spellman; Teleplay by : Nichelle Tramble Spellman & Dave Andron	February 21, 2012	2.02
33	7	"The Man Behind the Curtain"	Peter Werner	Ryan Farley	February 28, 2012	2.15
34	8	"Watching the Detectives"	Peter Werner	Graham Yost	March 6, 2012	2.16
35	9	"Loose Ends"	Gwyneth Horder-Payton	Ingrid Escajeda	March 13, 2012	2.26
36	10	"Guy Walks into a Bar"	Tony Goldwyn	VJ Boyd	March 20, 2012	2.32
37	11	"Measures"	John Dahl	Benjamin Cavell	March 27, 2012	2.49
38	12	"Coalition"	Bill Johnson	Taylor Elmore	April 3, 2012	2.46
39	13	"Slaughterhouse"	Dean Parisot	Story by : Graham Yost; Teleplay by : Fred Golan	April 10, 2012	2.66

=== Season 4 (2013) ===
No. overall	No. in season	Title	Directed by	Written by	Original release date	US viewers (millions)
40	1	"Hole in the Wall"	Michael Dinner	Graham Yost	January 8, 2013	3.59
41	2	"Where's Waldo?"	Bill Johnson	Dave Andron	January 15, 2013	2.45
42	3	"Truth and Consequences"	Jon Avnet	Benjamin Cavell	January 22, 2013	2.44
43	4	"This Bird Has Flown"	Bill Johnson	Taylor Elmore	January 29, 2013	2.08
44	5	"Kin"	Peter Werner	Fred Golan & VJ Boyd	February 5, 2013	2.42
45	6	"Foot Chase"	Peter Werner	Dave Andron & Ingrid Escajeda	February 12, 2013	2.30
46	7	"Money Trap"	Don Kurt	Story by : Elmore Leonard & Chris Provenzano; Teleplay by : Chris Provenzano	February 19, 2013	2.15
47	8	"Outlaw"	John Dahl	Benjamin Cavell & Keith Schreier	February 26, 2013	2.18
48	9	"The Hatchet Tour"	Lesli Linka Glatter	Taylor Elmore & Leonard Chang	March 5, 2013	2.32
49	10	"Get Drew"	Billy Gierhart	Dave Andron & VJ Boyd	March 12, 2013	2.40
50	11	"Decoy"	Michael Watkins	Graham Yost & Chris Provenzano	March 19, 2013	2.45
51	12	"Peace of Mind"	Gwyneth Horder-Payton	Taylor Elmore & Leonard Chang	March 26, 2013	2.44
52	13	"Ghosts"	Bill Johnson	Fred Golan & Benjamin Cavell	April 2, 2013	2.25

=== Season 5 (2014) ===
No. overall	No. in season	Title	Directed by	Written by	Original release date	US viewers (millions)
53	1	"A Murder of Crowes"	Michael Dinner	Graham Yost & Fred Golan	January 7, 2014	2.84
54	2	"The Kids Aren't All Right"	Bill Johnson	Dave Andron	January 14, 2014	2.23
55	3	"Good Intentions"	Dean Parisot	Benjamin Cavell	January 21, 2014	2.50
56	4	"Over the Mountain"	Gwyneth Horder-Payton	Taylor Elmore	January 28, 2014	2.36
57	5	"Shot All to Hell"	Adam Arkin	Chris Provenzano	February 4, 2014	2.39
58	6	"Kill the Messenger"	Don Kurt	Ingrid Escajeda	February 11, 2014	2.33
59	7	"Raw Deal"	Bill Johnson	VJ Boyd	February 25, 2014	2.10
60	8	"Whistle Past the Graveyard"	Peter Werner	Chris Provenzano	March 4, 2014	2.32
61	9	"Wrong Roads"	Michael Dinner	Dave Andron & Leonard Chang	March 11, 2014	2.24
62	10	"Weight"	John Dahl	Taylor Elmore & Keith Schreier	March 18, 2014	2.04
63	11	"The Toll"	Jon Avnet	Benjamin Cavell	March 25, 2014	2.05
64	12	"Starvation"	Michael Pressman	Chris Provenzano	April 1, 2014	2.04
65	13	"Restitution"	Adam Arkin	Fred Golan & Dave Andron	April 8, 2014	2.37

=== Season 6 (2015) ===
No. overall	No. in season	Title	Directed by	Written by	Original release date	US viewers (millions)
66	1	"Fate's Right Hand"	Michael Dinner	Michael Dinner & Fred Golan & Chris Provenzano	January 20, 2015	2.17
67	2	"Cash Game"	Dean Parisot	Dave Andron & VJ Boyd	January 27, 2015	1.71
68	3	"Noblesse Oblige"	Peter Weller	Taylor Elmore & Benjamin Cavell	February 3, 2015	2.01
69	4	"The Trash and the Snake"	Adam Arkin	Chris Provenzano & Ingrid Escajeda	February 10, 2015	1.65
70	5	"Sounding"	Jon Avnet	Dave Andron & Leonard Chang	February 17, 2015	1.73
71	6	"Alive Day"	Peter Werner	Benjamin Cavell & Jennifer Kennedy	February 24, 2015	1.81
72	7	"The Hunt"	John Dahl	Taylor Elmore & Keith Schreier	March 3, 2015	1.73
73	8	"Dark As a Dungeon"	Gwyneth Horder-Payton	Chris Provenzano & VJ Boyd	March 10, 2015	1.80
74	9	"Burned"	Don Kurt	Dave Andron & Leonard Chang & Jenny DeArmitt	March 17, 2015	1.81
75	10	"Trust"	Adam Arkin	Benjamin Cavell	March 24, 2015	1.72
76	11	"Fugitive Number One"	Jon Avnet	Taylor Elmore & Keith Schreier	March 31, 2015	1.96
77	12	"Collateral"	Michael Pressman	Chris Provenzano & VJ Boyd	April 7, 2015	1.83
78	13	"The Promise"	Adam Arkin	Graham Yost & Fred Golan & Dave Andron & Benjamin Cavell	April 14, 2015	2.24

=== City Primeval (2023) ===
No.	Title	Directed by	Written by	Original release date	U.S. viewers (millions)
1	"City Primeval"	Michael Dinner	Dave Andron & Michael Dinner	July 18, 2023	0.848
2	"The Oklahoma Wildman"	Michael Dinner	Dave Andron & Michael Dinner	July 18, 2023	0.493
3	"Backstabbers"	Jon Avnet	Eisa Davis & Chris Provenzano	July 25, 2023	0.560
4	"Kokomo"	Gwyneth Horder-Payton	Taylor Elmore	August 1, 2023	0.603
5	"You Good?"	Kevin Rodney Sullivan	Eisa Davis & Chris Provenzano	August 8, 2023	0.573
6	"Adios"	Sylvain White	Taylor Elmore & V.J. Boyd	August 15, 2023	0.665
7	"The Smoking Gun"	Katrelle Kindred	Dave Andron & Michael Dinner	August 22, 2023	0.590
8	"The Question"	Michael Dinner	Dave Andron & Michael Dinner	August 29, 2023	0.670

== Ratings ==
Justified : U.S. viewers per episode (millions)

Season	Episode number												
Season	1	2	3	4	5	6	7	8	9	10	11	12	13
1	4.16	3.57	2.31	2.10	2.41	2.06	2.26	2.46	2.09	2.09	1.81	2.13	2.03
2	3.47	2.41	2.59	2.64	2.71	2.37	2.22	2.64	2.79	2.50	2.50	2.92	2.68
3	3.07	2.71	2.71	2.21	2.13	2.02	2.15	2.16	2.26	2.32	2.49	2.46	2.66
4	3.59	2.45	2.44	2.08	2.42	2.30	2.15	2.18	2.32	2.10	2.45	2.44	2.25
5	2.84	2.23	2.50	2.36	2.39	2.33	2.10	2.32	2.24	2.04	2.05	2.04	2.37
6	2.17	1.71	2.01	1.65	1.73	1.81	1.73	1.80	1.81	1.72	1.96	1.83	2.24

Audience measurement performed by Nielsen Media Research
