= Justified season 1 =

Justified
- Season 1
- Season 1 DVD cover
- No. of episodes: 13

Release
- Original network: FX
- Original release: March 16 – June 8, 2010

Season chronology
- Next → Season 2

The first season of the American neo-Western television series Justified premiered on March 16, 2010, on FX, and concluded on June 8, 2010, consisting of 13 episodes. The series was developed by Graham Yost based on Elmore Leonard's novels Pronto and Riding the Rap and his short story "Fire in the Hole". Its main character is Raylan Givens, a deputy U.S. Marshal. Timothy Olyphant portrays Givens, a tough federal lawman, enforcing his own brand of justice in his Kentucky hometown. The series is set in the city of Lexington, Kentucky, and the hill country of eastern Kentucky, specifically in and around Harlan.

== Cast and characters ==
=== Main ===
- Timothy Olyphant as Raylan Givens, a suave deputy U.S. marshal who is reassigned to his home county of Harlan, Kentucky following a shooting.
- Nick Searcy as Art Mullen, the chief deputy of Lexington's marshals office.
- Joelle Carter as Ava Crowder, the wife of a member of the dangerous Crowder family.
- Jacob Pitts as Tim Gutterson, a Lexington deputy marshal.
- Erica Tazel as Rachel Brooks, a Lexington deputy marshal.
- Natalie Zea as Winona Hawkins, Raylan's ex-wife and a court reporter.

=== Recurring ===
- Walton Goggins as Boyd Crowder, an intelligent white supremacist, Ava's brother-in-law, and a former associate of Raylan's.
- David Meunier as Johnny Crowder, Boyd's cousin,
- M. C. Gainey as Bo Crowder, Boyd's ruthless father.
- William Ragsdale as Gary Hawkins, Winona's cowardly realtor husband who gets in legal trouble.
- Raymond J. Barry as Arlo Givens, Raylan's criminal father who runs afoul of Bo.
- Linda Gehringer as Helen Givens, Raylan's maternal aunt and stepmother.
- Rick Gomez as David Vasquez, an assistant U.S. attorney that is investigating Raylan after a shooting.
- Doug E. Doug as Israel Fandi, the pastor of a marijuana-loving church that Boyd targets.
- Damon Herriman as Dewey Crowe, Boyd's dim-witted henchman.
- Brent Sexton as Hunter Mosley, Harlan's seemingly good-natured sheriff.
- Jere Burns as Wynn Duffy, a volatile and dangerous Dixie Mafia enforcer who sets his sights on Gary.
- Alexandra Barreto as Pilar, the niece of a cartel lord who does business with Bo.
- Ray Porter as Hestler Jones, Bo's creepy henchman.
- David Eigenberg as Arnold Pinter, a smooth-talking informant.

=== Guest ===
- Steven Flynn as Emmitt Arnett, a Dixie Mafia higher-up who Gary owes money to.
- Kevin Rankin as Derek "Devil" Lennox, Boyd's henchman.
- Matt Craven as Dan Grant, a chief deputy U.S. marshal stationed in Miami and Raylan's superior.
- Stephen Root as Mike Reardon, an eccentric and harsh judge who unknowingly provokes the ire of an old associate.

== Production ==
While the pilot was shot in Pittsburgh and suburban Kittanning, Pennsylvania and Washington, Pennsylvania, the subsequent episodes were shot in California. The small town of Green Valley, California often doubles for Harlan, Kentucky. In the pilot, Pittsburgh's David L. Lawrence Convention Center appears on film as the small town "airport" and the construction of the new Consol Energy Center serves as the "new courthouse".

== Episodes ==
No. overall	No. in season	Title	Directed by	Written by	Original release date	US viewers (millions)
1	1	"Fire in the Hole"	Michael Dinner	Teleplay by : Graham Yost	March 16, 2010	4.16
Deputy U.S. marshal Raylan Givens is removed from his post in Miami and reassigned to Lexington after killing cartel associate Tommy Bucks when he pulls a gun. Chief deputy marshal and his former FLETC associate Art Mullen asks him to go to his home county of Harlan to look into white supremacist Boyd Crowder, who Raylan worked in a coal mine with when they were young. Boyd's brother Bowman is killed by his abused wife Ava, and Raylan protects her from Boyd's man Dewey Crowe. Boyd holds her hostage, forcing her to call Raylan for help. As they face off, Ava pulls a gun on Boyd and Raylan shoots him while he is distracted. He visits his court reporter ex-wife Winona Hawkins and wonders if he would've shot Bucks no matter what, remarking that he never thought of himself as angry. She claims he is "the angriest man I've ever known."
2	2	"Riverbrook"	Michael Dinner	Graham Yost	March 23, 2010	3.53
Raylan visits a now religious Boyd in a prison hospital. Ava tries to seduce Raylan, but he turns her down to not compromise her as a witness against Boyd. Robber Douglas Cooper escapes from prison to recover a money stash, agreeing to give a cut of it to his ex-wife Shirley Kelso and her cousin Dupree in exchange for their help. Dupree shoots him when he accidentally leads them to the wrong house, and he points Raylan the correct way when found. Dupree takes the house's residents hostage when he learns they spent the money and asks Shirley to turn the lights off when Raylan confronts him. She does, but turns them back on for shooting Cooper, allowing him to be killed by deputy marshal Tim Gutterson. Raylan escorts Cooper to jail after he recovers, who wonders if he still has a chance with Shirley.
3	3	"Fixer"	Fred Keller	Benjamin Cavell	March 30, 2010	2.31
Local informant and bookmaker Arnold Pinter sends his enforcer Curtis Mims to collect from debtor Travis Travers, who convinces Mims and Pinter's girlfriend to kidnap him and "torture" her until he gives up his money. Raylan arrives at Pinter's house to give him reward money for a fugitive he informed on, but Mims convinces him to come back later and plans to kill him. Travers kills Mims when he annoys him and tries to kill Raylan when he returns, but Raylan outmaneuvers him and kills him first. He later visits Ava and kisses her.
4	4	"Long in the Tooth"	Adam Arkin	Chris Provenzano	April 6, 2010	2.10
Former cartel accountant turned dentist Roland Pike puts himself on the cartel's radar when he attacks a rude client. Raylan is sent to Los Angeles to catch him, while cartel head Gio Reyes sends hitmen to kill both men. Roland and his girlfriend try to get across the border with help from a coyote, but Roland kills him when he tries to rape her. Raylan kills the hitmen when they confront him and tracks down Roland just as he is shot at by a cartel sniper. Knowing the sniper will kill them all if he has to come closer, Roland stands and allows himself to be shot.
5	5	"The Lord of War and Thunder"	Jon Avnet	Gary Lennon	April 13, 2010	2.41
Raylan infiltrates the home of a fugitive by posing as a landscaper, having a tense moment with the man's wife but convincing her to stand down. Raylan's criminal father Arlo vandalizes the home of debtor Stan Perkins, who sends his nephews to take back property Arlo stole, injuring Raylan's aunt and stepmother Helen in the process. Arlo has a heart attack while beating the nephews, forcing Raylan to step in. He learns from Boyd's cousin Johnny that Perkins is a drug smuggler, and is warned that Boyd's father Bo is being released from prison soon and will want revenge on Ava for Bowman. Raylan finds drugs in Perkins's house, but realizes that Arlo set them both up by stealing Perkins's drugs and planting some to get him arrested. He confronts Arlo, who refuses to tell the truth, and promises to put him in jail after realizing Helen planted the drugs and lied to him.
6	6	"The Collection"	Rod Holcomb	Graham Yost	April 20, 2010	2.06
Raylan visits Boyd and asks for incriminating evidence on Arlo. Winona asks Raylan to look into her husband Gary's possibly illegal activities, which he warns Gary to keep her out of. He is sent to Cincinnati when embezzler Owen Carnes tries to sell Hitler paintings to gallery owner Karl Hanselman, who reveals they are fake. When Carnes and his wife Caryn confront the seller, she has Greg Davis, a worker she is having an affair with, kill Carnes to prevent him from going to trial and losing Caryn their assets. The death is staged as a suicide, but Raylan, suspecting foul play, confronts Greg and warns him that killing with witnesses always creates more death. Frightened, Greg refuses to kill the seller when Caryn orders him to and sells her out to the police. Hanselman explains to Raylan why he collects Hitler paintings: his father did as well, so in defiance, he made a hobby of buying and burning them. Moved by this, Raylan returns to Boyd and turns down his offer of discovered information.
7	7	"Blind Spot"	Michael Watkins	Wendy Calhoun	April 27, 2010	2.26
After Johnny threatens Ava, hitman Red attacks her and Raylan. Raylan wounds him, but he escapes. He has Harlan sheriff Hunter Mosley help him interrogate Johnny, who insists he was just trying to scare Ava out of Kentucky to save her from Bo. He then visits Boyd, who points out that the target could have been himself. Red returns to his cartel handler and they are visited by Mosley, also working for the cartel. He kills the handler when he gets the order to kill them, then calls Raylan, having kidnapped Ava, and orders them to meet. He and Red take Raylan and Ava, only for Ava to attack Red, distracting Mosley and allowing Raylan to arrest him. Boyd is almost attacked in prison for talking to Raylan, but Bo steps in to protect him.
8	8	"Blowback"	Jon Avnet	Benjamin Cavell	May 4, 2010	2.46
Bo is released after Mosley's arrests are reviewed. "Security consultant" Wynn Duffy visits Winona's house and makes veiled threats towards her, though Gary denies knowing him. AUSA David Vasquez comes to the Lexington office to interview Raylan about Boyd's shooting, but is interrupted by an inmate taking a pair of guards hostage. Needing to avoid more scrutiny by killing him in front of Vasquez, Raylan earns his trust with fried chicken, talking the man into surrendering. Vasquez reveals that Boyd's lawyer is using Raylan and Ava's relationship to claim that Bowman's murder and Boyd's shooting were premeditated, getting Boyd released early. Raylan greets him and promises to put him back in jail, though Boyd remains pious.
9	9	"Hatless"	Peter Werner	Dave Andron	May 11, 2010	2.09
Art has Raylan take time off following Boyd's release, and he gets into a fight with a pair of bar patrons that take his hat. Winona tells him about Duffy as she tends to his injuries. Pinter explains that Duffy works under a man named Emmitt Arnett that Gary is in debt to, both men part of the Dixie Mafia. Gary asks a friend of his for help intimidating Duffy, but Duffy brutalizes the man. Raylan stops Gary before he can kill himself to void the debt, accompanying him to his meeting with Arnett and appeasing him by handing over Gary's lucrative property. Enraged that he is not being paid with money, Duffy pulls a gun, resulting in a fight that ends with him detained. Raylan goes back to the bar and forces the patrons to return his hat.
10	10	"The Hammer"	John Dahl	Fred Golan & Chris Provenzano	May 18, 2010	2.08
Boyd establishes a camp of ex-convicts that he claims to be reforming through religion. After multiple attempts on the life of eccentric and harsh judge Mike Reardon, Raylan is assigned to protect him. Reardon is cornered outside a bar by an armed man he unfairly sentenced, but Raylan finds him and distracts the man, allowing Reardon to shoot him. As thanks, Reardon agrees to renegotiate Ava's parole, allowing her to leave Kentucky, though she refuses to go. Boyd, now morally opposed to the production of meth, burns a lab when local cooks refuse to stop, unwittingly killing one in the process. When Raylan learns the cook was an informant, he tracks down a man Boyd attacked and tries to strong-arm him into testifying, only to give up when he realizes the man does not know what Boyd looks like.
11	11	"Veterans"	Tony Goldwyn	Benjamin Daniel Lobato	May 25, 2010	1.81
The marshals arrest Boyd and his men for parole violations, but they refuse to implicate him for burning the lab. Raylan visits an imprisoned Mosley to ask for information on Bo, who reveals that Arlo was tasked with running Bo's business while in prison and lost money. Arlo refuses Raylan's protection despite Bo's men shooting up his house. Raylan goes looking for the remaining cooks, only for Bo to have them killed for selling on his territory. Believing Boyd killed them, Raylan goes to confront him and finds Dewey hitchhiking, having been kicked out of the camp for masturbating. He presses him into revealing one of Boyd's men was a meth cook, giving him an excuse to search the camp again. Dewey discreetly calls ahead and Boyd's men hide the cook until the marshals leave. The cook turns himself in and testifies to burning the lab alone, while Boyd spares Dewey's life and lets him leave. Raylan finds Arlo waiting for him in his motel room.
12	12	"Fathers and Sons"	Michael Katleman	Dave Andron	June 1, 2010	2.13
Arlo agrees to inform on Bo for immunity but refuses to wear a wire. Reyes agrees to ship ephedrine to Bo and asks him to kill Raylan. Bo's men occupy Bowman's house on his orders and harass Ava, who witnesses Winona leave Raylan's motel room after having sex with him. Ava enters Bo's club armed and warns him to leave her alone. After Arlo defuses a veteran's plan to blow up a VFW building, he decides to wear the wire and the marshals give him money to appease Bo with. He silently communicates to Bo that he is bugged and arranges a meeting, giving him a fake envelope instead of the money. Bo mentions Ava threatening him, and when Raylan confronts her, she reveals she knows about Winona and refuses to leave the state. Boyd intercepts and destroys Reyes's ephedrine shipment.
13	13	"Bulletville"	Adam Arkin	Fred Golan	June 8, 2010	2.03
Bo disowns Boyd and massacres his men, leaving Boyd to renounce his faith. Bo orders Arlo to bring him Raylan, so he lures Raylan to his motel room. Raylan notices Arlo reaching for his gun, shoots him, and kills Bo's men that burst in. Bo kidnaps Ava and shoots Johnny after realizing he conspired with Boyd to get him killed by the cartel so they could take over. He calls Raylan and demands they meet at his hunting cabin, and Boyd joins him to help rescue Ava. They kill Bo's men, but Reyes's niece and nephew arrive and kill Bo. Boyd and Raylan kill the nephew, and Raylan tries to stop Boyd from pursuing the niece. Boyd points out that Raylan's gun is empty and calls him "the only friend I have left in this world" before driving away. Raylan points his gun at him and mimes firing it.

== Reception ==
On Rotten Tomatoes, the season has an approval rating of 93% with an average score of 8.3 out of 10 based on 43 reviews. The website's critical consensus reads, "A coolly violent drama, Justified benefits from a seductive look and a note-perfect Timothy Olyphant performance." On Metacritic, the season has a weighted average score of 80 out of 100, based on 27 critics, indicating "universal acclaim.

TV Guide critic Matt Roush praised the show, particularly the acting of Olyphant, stating: "The show is grounded in Olyphant's low-key but high-impact star-making performance, the work of a confident and cunning leading man who's always good company." Chicago Tribune critic Maureen Ryan also praised the series, writing: "The shaggily delightful dialogue, the deft pacing, the authentic sense of place, the rock-solid supporting cast and the feeling that you are in the hands of writers, actors and directors who really know what they're doing—all of these are worthy reasons to watch Justified." Mike Hale of The New York Times praised the shows "modest virtues", but was critical of the first season's pace and characterisation, writing: "Justified can feel so low-key that even the crisis points drift past without making much of an impression... It feels as if the attention that should have gone to the storytelling all went to the atmosphere and the repartee."

=== Awards ===
Justified received a 2010 Peabody Award. For the first season, the series received a single Primetime Emmy Award nomination, for Outstanding Original Main Title Theme Music.

=== Ratings ===
The first season averaged 2.417 million viewers and a 0.9 rating in the 18–49 demographic.

== Home media release ==
The first season was released on Blu-ray and DVD in region 1 on January 18, 2011, in region 2 on November 29, 2010, and in region 4 on June 7, 2012. Special features on the season one set include four audio commentaries by cast and crew, five behind-the-scenes featurettes, a music video, and a season two trailer.
