= Long in the Tooth (Justified) =

- Justified episode
- Episode no.: Season 1 Episode 4
- Directed by: Adam Arkin
- Written by: Chris Provenzano
- Cinematography by: Francis Kenny
- Editing by: Bill Johnson
- Original air date: April 6, 2010
- Running time: 41 minutes

Guest appearances
- Alan Ruck as Roland Pike; Michele Nordin as Mindy Springer; Lance Barber as Frank; Brian Goodman as Joe; Brandon Keener as Ferguson; David Warshofsky as Jim Ferzinsky; Clarence Williams III as Jones

Episode chronology
← Previous "Fixer"	Next → "The Lord of War and Thunder"
- Justified (season 1)

"Long in the Tooth" is the fourth episode of the first season of the American Neo-Western television series Justified. It is the 4th overall episode of the series and was written by Chris Provenzano and directed by Adam Arkin. It originally aired on FX on April 6, 2010.

The series is based on Elmore Leonard's stories about the character Raylan Givens, particularly "Fire in the Hole", which serves as the basis for the episode. The series follows Raylan Givens, a tough deputy U.S. Marshal enforcing his own brand of justice. Following the shooting of a mob hitman, Raylan is sent to Lexington, Kentucky to investigate an old childhood friend Boyd Crowder, who is now part of a white supremacist gang. In the episode, Raylan finds that a criminal he failed to arrest years ago has been found in Los Angeles and sets to find him before the mob gets him first. Despite being credited, Joelle Carter, Jacob Pitts and Natalie Zea don't appear in the episode.

According to Nielsen Media Research, the episode was seen by an estimated 2.10 million household viewers and gained a 0.9/2 ratings share among adults aged 18–49. The episode received very positive reviews from critics, who praised the writing and performances although some critics expressed concern about Raylan's death count.

== Plot ==
In Los Angeles, a dentist named Peter Oldham (Alan Ruck) overhears one of his patients, a man named Ferguson (Brandon Keener), complaining to his receptionist Mindy (Michele Nordin) about his insurance plan. At the parking lot, Oldham corners Ferguson and removes teeth before leaving the scene.

Raylan (Timothy Olyphant) is notified of the case and recognizes Oldham as Roland Pike, a fugitive he previously pursued. Raylan and Rachel (Erica Tazel) are sent to Los Angeles to investigate. Unbeknownst to them, Pike sees them and recognizes Raylan from a distance. He is later joined by Mindy, who has stolen dental gold in order to flee to Belize and avoid extradition. Pike confesses to Mindy that he worked as an accountant for the mob, helping them engage in money laundering, until he stole money from them and changed his identity. Despite the confession, Mindy decides to leave with him.

Pike is caught by an elderly man (Clarence Williams III) when he attempts to steal a car, so he is forced to give the man his car to buy his silence. When he meets with Mindy, Pike finds that she sold the dental gold for a lower value. To complicate things, he is called by Raylan, who warns him that the mob will find him as his image is being sent throughout the country. As his contact is now out of the illegal business, Pike and Mindy are forced to find a coyote. They ask one of Pike's patients for help but the woman refuses. However, the woman's father decides to help them and directs them to a coyote. Before they leave, the woman calls the police.

When questioned by the authorities, the father misleads them in order to give Pike and Mindy more time to escape. Raylan asks him for the real address, as the mob will want to kill Pike and Mindy if they get there first. During this, Raylan finds and meets with Joe (Brian Goodman) and Frank (Lance Barber), two enforcers for the mob looking for Pike. They later find themselves again at the location of Pike's and Mindy's coyote and during the face-off, Raylan kills Frank and mortally wounds Joe, who reveals that the cartel has arranged a hit man to kill Pike in Mexico. Meanwhile, while being led by a coyote, the coyote suddenly asks for a bigger payment, which exceeds the couple's money. The coyote tries to rape Mindy but Pike hits him with a rock and kills him. He is shaken by this and tells Mindy to leave without him but she decides to stay with him and they continue their journey.

Raylan eventually catches up with Pike and Mindy but a mob sniper forces them to cover. During the shootout, Pike reveals how he was inspired by Rudolph the Red-Nosed Reindeer to abandon his mob life and focus on being a dentist, deeming it as a sign of God. Pike accepts his fate and lets the sniper spot him and is killed by a gunshot. The sniper flees as Mindy grieves over Pike's body.

== Reception ==
=== Viewers ===
In its original American broadcast, "Long in the Tooth" was seen by an estimated 2.10 million household viewers and gained a 0.9/2 ratings share among adults aged 18–49, according to Nielsen Media Research. This means that 0.9 percent of all households with televisions watched the episode, while 2 percent of all households watching television at that time watched it. This was a 10% decrease in viewership from the previous episode, which was watched by 2.31 million viewers with a 0.9/3 in the 18–49 demographics.

=== Critical reviews ===
"Long in the Tooth" received very positive reviews from critics. Seth Amitin of IGN gave the episode a "great" 8.8 out of 10 rating and wrote, "'Long in the Tooth' was a very good episode for the above reasons, but also for giving us some background to Raylan -- something that's been withheld since the first episode. Raylan was not always the cool, calm, Clint Eastwood type. He was at one point a rookie who made mistakes. When they start really delving into it, the interest sparked from the pilot is going to return quickly."

Alan Sepinwall of The Star-Ledger wrote, "'Long in the Tooth' wasn't perfect. The episode introduced the idea of Raylan having to sit back and let Rachel take lead, then abruptly dropped it halfway through so Raylan could be solo and have his duel in the sun. Raylan having to suppress his innate Raylan-ness for the sake of a higher-ranking, equally competent Marshal actually sounds like a fun idea, but you either follow through with it and give it a payoff, or you don't do it. But it was still quite a lot of fun, extremely compelling and hopefully a signpost towards more good things to come."

Scott Tobias of The A.V. Club gave the episode an "A−" grade and wrote, "Justified has the potential for greatness, and in the current era of expansive small-screen visions, great television dramas are always moving forward. That said, if Justified can put out hours as vastly entertaining as 'Long In The Tooth' with some regularity, fuck serialization."

Luke Dwyer of TV Fanatic gave the episode a 4 star rating out of 5 and wrote, "In evaluating last week's episode, I felt that its biggest problem – and thus the biggest problem with the show – was that the storyline and writing each week were, well, not very good. The pieces were in place – good main character, decent supporting characters and some good one-off performances by villains – the show just needed some better stories for their characters. On 'Long in the Tooth' this week, we were treated to the first interesting story to follow since the premiere."
