= Riverbrook =

- Justified episode
- Episode no.: Season 1 Episode 2
- Directed by: Michael Dinner
- Written by: Graham Yost
- Cinematography by: Peter Levy
- Editing by: Bill Johnson
- Original air date: March 23, 2010
- Running time: 41 minutes

Guest appearances
- Kristin Bauer as Shirley Kelso; Chris Ellis as Douglas Cooper; Damon Herriman as Dewey Crowe; Johnny Sneed as Dupree; Myk Watford as Price; Bill Glass as Mr. Lawlor; Colleen McGrann as Mrs. Lawlor; Walton Goggins as Boyd Crowder

Episode chronology
| ← Previous "Fire in the Hole" | Next → "Fixer" |
- Justified (season 1)

"Riverbrook" is the second episode of the first season of the American Neo-Western television series Justified. It is the 2nd overall episode of the series and was written by series developer Graham Yost and directed by Michael Dinner. It originally aired on FX on March 23, 2010.

The series is based on Elmore Leonard's stories about the character Raylan Givens, particularly "Fire in the Hole", which serves as the basis for the episode. The series follows Raylan Givens, a tough deputy U.S. Marshal enforcing his own brand of justice. Following the shooting of a mob hitman, Raylan is sent to Lexington, Kentucky to investigate an old childhood friend Boyd Crowder, who is now part of a white supremacist gang. In the episode, Raylan must find two inmates who escaped from a prison band performance with one of them intending to find money he hid years before his sentence.

According to Nielsen Media Research, the episode was seen by an estimated 3.53 million household viewers and gained a 1.4/4 ratings share among adults aged 18–49. The episode received generally positive reviews from critics, although some critics expressed mixed feelings about the case, with many deeming it inferior to the previous episode.

== Plot ==
Raylan (Timothy Olyphant) visits a wounded Boyd (Walton Goggins) in a prison hospital, with the latter thanking him for "opening his soul in the eyes of God". Raylan then escorts Dewey (Damon Herriman) out of the hospital, intending to take him to jail despite having no back-up team to help him. He forces Dewey to drive the car and handcuffs him to the steering wheel when he tries to attack him.

Meanwhile, prison officials transport inmates to a prison music event. After a performance, two inmates, Cooper (Chris Ellis) and Price (Myk Watford), knock out their guard and escape. Mullen (Nick Searcy) assigns Raylan to investigate the jailbreak. Raylan finds the escapees at a convenience store. However, Cooper gets the drop on Raylan and steals his badge, guns, hat and car, then locks Raylan in a closet while they flee. The next day, Mullen informs Raylan that they found his car near the airport along with his hat; Price has been captured. Mullen also tells Raylan that Assistant United States Attorney David Vasquez wants to question him about Boyd's shooting due to the previous incident in Miami. Vasquez also wants Ava (Joelle Carter) to testify.

Winona (Natalie Zea) confronts Raylan after he broke into her house and scaring her husband, telling him to never contact them again. Raylan and Tim (Jacob Pitts) then question Cooper's ex-wife, Shirley Kelso (Kristin Bauer), who now lives with her cousin Dupree (Johnny Sneed). They leave after receiving no vital information. However, Cooper unexpectedly shows up at Shirley's house and deduces that she and Dupree are in a sexual relationship. The couple are looking for money Cooper hid in the flooring of a housing development, and Cooper agrees to help them for a share of the money. They arrive at an abandoned house but discover that the money is not there. Dupree then shoots Cooper and abandons him to find the real location with Shirley.

While staying with Ava in a hotel room, Raylan has a hunch about the real location of the money and leaves with Rachel (Erica Tazel). They run across a wounded Cooper and discover that he had misremembered the location, heading to the proper house. However, Shirley and Dupree have already arrived and taken the homeowners hostage after learning that they already found and spent the money. Dupree threatens to kill Raylan, but Tim kills him from a distance after Shirley betrays his orders, feeling guilty about shooting her husband. One week later, Raylan transfers Cooper out of the prison hospital. During their walk, they talk about the recent events, with Cooper remarking that maybe he and Shirley will be released at the same time.

== Production ==
=== Casting ===
Starting with this episode, Joelle Carter and Natalie Zea are now credited as regular cast members, after having received guest star billing on the previous episode, "Fire in the Hole".

== Reception ==
=== Viewers ===
In its original American broadcast, "Riverbrook" was seen by an estimated 3.53 million household viewers and gained a 1.4/4 ratings share among adults aged 18–49, according to Nielsen Media Research. This means that 1.4 percent of all households with televisions watched the episode, while 4 percent of all households watching television at that time watched it. This was a 16% decrease in viewership from the previous episode, which was watched by 4.16 million viewers with a 1.5 in the 18-49 demographics.

=== Critical reviews ===
"Riverbrook" received generally positive reviews from critics. Seth Amitin of IGN gave the episode a "good" 7.8 out of 10 rating and wrote, "Obviously Justified had to stay back on the serial plot; running that stuff into the ground early would kill interest. Rome wasn't built in a day, you know. Heck, imagine Batman if he only battled the Joker every time out. It'd get pretty boring. So thankfully, our Batman took down a small-time bank robber and the Lincoln Logs of the serial story will keep stacking."

Alan Sepinwall of The Star-Ledger wrote, "Of the four episodes of Justified I've seen, 'Riverbrook' was definitely the weakest of the bunch - not bad, but a definite comedown from the thrills, chills and laughs of the pilot, and not as strong at working without an Elmore Leonard safety net as the third or (particularly) fourth episode."

Scott Tobias of The A.V. Club gave the episode a "B" grade and wrote, "'Riverbrook' has a plot that's more or less boilerplate cop show stuff, elevated by many of the elements that made the pilot so distinctive — a great sense of local color, Olyphant's tremendous charisma as Raylan, and lots of flavorful dialogue. Yost, who scripted this week's episode as well as the pilot, doesn't strain to outdo Leonard, but he has the voice down cold, and he fires off some sharp colloquialisms and one-liners. For now, I guess we'll just have to let the show inch along at its own pace." Luke Dwyer of TV Fanatic gave the episode a 3 star rating out of 5 and wrote, "While the premiere delivered, the second episode left me wanting more of what I got in the premiere."
