= The Hammer (Justified) =

- Justified episode
- Episode no.: Season 1 Episode 10
- Directed by: John Dahl
- Written by: Fred Golan & Chris Provenzano
- Cinematography by: Edward J. Pei
- Editing by: Keith Henderson
- Original air date: May 18, 2010
- Running time: 40 minutes

Guest appearances
- Stephen Root as Judge Mike Reardon; Doug E. Doug as Israel Fandi; Jenni Blong as Molly Tucker; Sean Bridgers as Virgil Corum; Brad Carter as Bobby Joe Packer; Darin Heames as Mickey; David Meunier as Johnny Crowder; Walton Goggins as Boyd Crowder

Episode chronology
← Previous "Hatless"	Next → "Veterans"
- Justified (season 1)

"The Hammer" is the tenth episode of the first season of the American Neo-Western television series Justified. It is the 10th overall episode of the series and was written by co-executive producer Fred Golan and executive story editor Chris Provenzano and directed by John Dahl. It originally aired on FX on May 18, 2010.

The series is based on Elmore Leonard's stories about the character Raylan Givens, particularly "Fire in the Hole", which serves as the basis for the episode. The series follows Raylan Givens, a tough deputy U.S. Marshal enforcing his own brand of justice. Following the shooting of a mob hitman, Raylan is sent to Lexington, Kentucky to investigate an old childhood friend Boyd Crowder, who is now part of a white supremacist gang. In the episode, Raylan is assigned to guard an eccentric judge, but Raylan takes time off from the assignment to track down an old lead connected with the Crowders. Despite being credited, Erica Tazel and Natalie Zea do not appear in the episode.

According to Nielsen Media Research, the episode was seen by an estimated 2.08 million household viewers and gained a 0.8/2 ratings share among adults aged 18–49. The episode received positive reviews from critics, with critics praising the performances (particularly Olyphant, Goggins and Root) as well as character development.

== Plot ==
Raylan (Timothy Olyphant) finds Boyd (Walton Goggins) in the woods, having formed a church to help drug addicts and other spiritually reformed criminals, threatening them to quit their habits. Raylan uses the moment to expose Boyd's crimes as well as offering a reward to anyone who can help putting him back in jail and then leaves.

An ambulance arrives at a house, where Judge Mike "The Hammer" Reardon (Stephen Root) was bitten by a snake. Raylan is assigned to protect him despite being embarrassed by Reardon's eccentric behavior. While escorting him, Reardon is poisoned with carbon monoxide through the car's exhaust system. Raylan is also trying to locate Pastor Israel Fandi (Doug E. Doug), who has changed his name and occupation. Ambulances arrive in time to save Reardon. Meanwhile, Johnny (David Meunier) visits Boyd in the woods after Boyd threatened a nearby meth lab. He tells Boyd that Bo is angry at the threat but Boyd does not give it importance. That night, Boyd and his followers take the meth dealers out of their RV and burn it. However, the dealers reveal that a person was inside the RV.

Raylan visits Fandi, who refuses to testify against Boyd. While at a bar with Reardon, Raylan notices a man (Sean Bridgers) watching them and confronts the man. Raylan later finds that the man is Virgil Corum, a convict charged with illegal possessions and whose background fits all of Reardon's recent events. Virgil eventually catches Reardon in the parking lot of a club, intending to kill him. Raylan arrives in time and tries to calm him down. However, Reardon pulls out a gun and shoots Virgil, wounding him. Virgil reveals planning to kill Reardon as a way to give his ex-wife and kid money.

Not wanting to let the relationship cause destruction, Raylan breaks up with Ava (Joelle Carter) and Reardon makes a deal with a judge to reduce her probation. Raylan later talks with Mullen (Nick Searcy), who reveals the meth lab explosion and that the man killed in the RV was an informant. Despite both suspecting Boyd, they can't prove his involvement. Raylan visits Fandi again and threatens him to testify in exchange for not exposing his illegal marijuana operation. Fandi agrees to testify but reveals he does not know what Boyd looks like, shocking Raylan. Now unwilling to force him to testify, Raylan leaves.

== Reception ==
=== Viewers ===
In its original American broadcast, "The Hammer" was seen by an estimated 2.08 million household viewers and gained a 0.8/2 ratings share among adults aged 18–49, according to Nielsen Media Research. This means that 0.8 percent of all households with televisions watched the episode, while 2 percent of all households watching television at that time watched it. This was a slight decrease in viewership from the previous episode, which was watched by 2.09 million viewers with a 0.8/2 in the 18-49 demographics.

=== Critical reviews ===
"The Hammer" received positive reviews from critics. Seth Amitin of IGN gave the episode a "great" 8 out of 10 rating and wrote, "In the long run, it may be better for the show to ditch the serialized parts and take the Law & Order approach. Stick to developing the characters on the law side and give us some glimpses into the bad guys. Justified is loaded with enough content to do this and well-written enough to still be a very good or even great show without giving so many minutes to each murderer in each episode. I still believe, however, that if a show can make this work, it's this show. I'll probably wait until the season finale before bringing this up again, but it's already got a second season and I think we all want to see Justified reach its full potential."

Alan Sepinwall of HitFix wrote, "Either way, we're heading for what should be an epic showdown between these two. The only question is whether either of them will have the heart to pull the trigger when that time comes."

Scott Tobias of The A.V. Club gave the episode an "A" grade and wrote, "Overall, the show has been settling into a nice balance of episodic A-stories and serialized movement, with the latter occasionally taking over. Casual viewers and fans should both leave pretty satisfied."

Luke Dwyer of TV Fanatic gave the episode a 3 star rating out of 5 and wrote, "Redemption was the main theme of 'The Hammer'. Everyone wants it, but how do you get it? For Boyd, he's attempting to remake his image as a criminal into a man who follows the word of the Lord and does well by his God."
