= Veterans (Justified) =

- Justified episode
- Episode no.: Season 1 Episode 11
- Directed by: Tony Goldwyn
- Written by: Benjamin Daniel Lobato
- Cinematography by: Francis Kenny
- Editing by: Bill Johnson
- Original air date: May 25, 2010
- Running time: 40 minutes

Guest appearances
- Raymond J. Barry as Arlo Givens; M. C. Gainey as Bo Crowder; Linda Gehringer as Helen Givens; Jim Haynie as Lemuel Briggs; Damon Herriman as Dewey Crowe; Brent Sexton as Sheriff Hunter Mosley; Kevin E. West as Frank Choate; Brad Carter as Bobby Joe Packer; David Meunier as Johnny Crowder; Ray Porter as Hestler Jones; Walton Goggins as Boyd Crowder

Episode chronology
| ← Previous "The Hammer" | Next → "Fathers and Sons" |
- Justified (season 1)

"Veterans" is the eleventh episode of the first season of the American Neo-Western television series Justified. It is the 11th overall episode of the series and was written by Benjamin Daniel Lobato and directed by Tony Goldwyn. It originally aired on FX on May 25, 2010.

The series is based on Elmore Leonard's stories about the character Raylan Givens, particularly "Fire in the Hole", which serves as the basis for the episode. The series follows Raylan Givens, a tough deputy U.S. Marshal enforcing his own brand of justice. Following the shooting of a mob hitman, Raylan is sent to Lexington, Kentucky to investigate an old childhood friend Boyd Crowder, who is now part of a white supremacist gang. In the episode, Raylan must stop Boyd and his followers from causing chaos in Harlan as his father Arlo turns out to be involved. Despite being credited, Erica Tazel does not appear in the episode.

According to Nielsen Media Research, the episode was seen by an estimated 1.81 million household viewers and gained a 0.7/2 ratings share among adults aged 18–49. The episode received generally positive reviews from critics, who praised the build-up to the last episodes of the season although some criticized its pace.

== Plot ==
Raylan (Timothy Olyphant) and Mullen (Nick Searcy) lead a raid on Boyd's (Walton Goggins) camp, arresting him for violating his parole. They question all of his followers but all of them reply with the same quote, "You strike at the shepherd, so that the sheep may scatter."

Without any back-up evidence that Boyd blew up the meth lab, the team must find the two dealers as Boyd and his followers are released. The dealers have met with Bo (M. C. Gainey) and Johnny (David Meunier) to ask for protection, which they accept to provide. Bo and Johnny visit Boyd in his camp, where Bo offers him money as payment for blowing up the meth lab, but Boyd refuses the money. Raylan meets Sheriff Hunter Mosley (Brent Sexton) in prison to ask for anything regarding Bo. Mosley reveals that Arlo (Raymond J. Barry) was put in charge of running the protection business for Bo while he was in jail. Now that he is out, Bo wants his money from Arlo, money that Arlo has lost in the meantime.

While taking the dealers to protection, Bo has his men kill them and dump their bodies. Raylan and Mullen try to enter the local Veterans of Foreign Wars building which Arlo frequents, but are denied access by the guard unless they have a membership. They call Gutterson (Jacob Pitts), a fellow Marshall who served as an army Ranger in Afghanistan, to help them get in. Inside, they talk with Arlo and offer him protection against Bo, but he refuses. When Raylan calls him a "lowlife", Arlo slaps him. As the officers leave, they are called to the crime scene of the dealers' deaths. Unaware of Bo's role in their deaths, they attribute the crime to Boyd and his followers. Raylan then finds Dewey Crowe (Damon Herriman) hitchhiking, having been expelled from Boyd's camp for the ‘sin’ of “onanism". Raylan tricks Dewey into revealing camp information by ‘deputizing’ him.

Dewey reveals that one of Boyd's men, Bobby Joe Packer (Brad Carter) was a meth cooker and the Marshals once again raid Boyd's camp to search for him. During this, Boyd reveals to Raylan that Bowman worked with Arlo, surprising Raylan as Ava (Joelle Carter) never mentioned it. The Marshals leave when they fail to find Bobby. Right after they leave, Boyd's men dig up Bobby, who was hiding in a box beneath the ground. Turns out Dewey warned them about Raylan's plan. Raylan then meets with a drunk Ava at a bar, who resists leaving. He is forced to handcuff her and asks Winona (Natalie Zea) to give her shelter, which she reluctantly accepts.

Arlo and Helen (Linda Gehringer) have a fight after she finds that Arlo took her money and is now in debt with Bo. Suddenly, their house is attacked by gunfire and the attackers escape. Helen gives Arlo an ultimatum: either they leave Harlan or he kills Bo. Dewey returns to Boyd's camp but Boyd plans to kill him as he can't risk putting his followers in contact with Raylan. Finally, Boyd forgives him but banishes him from the camp. Boyd is then shown buying a rocket-propelled grenade. At the Marshal's office, Bobby appears and confesses to blowing up the meth lab. Raylan returns to his hotel room, only to find Arlo waiting for him.

== Production ==
Series developer Graham Yost revealed in a January 2015 interview that Dewey Crowe was intended to die in the episode. He further detailed, "Dewey had done some transgression and Boyd was gonna kill him for it. I remember getting the notes back from the network, and the studio, and frankly, [executive producer] Sarah Timberman: 'No! You can't kill Dewey!' So I said, 'OK. OK. We won't.' And Dewey lived to survive another five seasons."

== Reception ==
=== Viewers ===
In its original American broadcast, "Veterans" was seen by an estimated 1.81 million household viewers and gained a 0.7/2 ratings share among adults aged 18–49, according to Nielsen Media Research. This means that 0.7 percent of all households with televisions watched the episode, while 2 percent of all households watching television at that time watched it. This was a 13% decrease in viewership from the previous episode, which was watched by 2.08 million viewers with a 0.8/2 in the 18-49 demographics.

=== Critical reviews ===
"Veterans" received generally positive reviews from critics. Seth Amitin of IGN gave the episode a "good" 7.5 out of 10 rating and wrote, "Seems a lot of viewers haven't tuned out, but are, like me, waiting for this show to turn the corner. This was maybe the closest thing we've seen to what we were promised in the pilot and it was a tad slow. But some episodes are like that. Not all episodes can be dudes shooting dudes at the dinner table or dudes firing rocket-propelled grenades at a church. A sad fact of life. We do need good plot and good characters and good dialogues for a show to be a great show."

Alan Sepinwall of HitFix wrote, "Where previous episodes at least put in a token standalone story like Raylan Givens: Landscape Architect, 'Veterans' recognized that Raylan's dealing with too many crises now to bother with the other stuff. (Which isn't to say the other stuff hasn't been good, as evidenced by last week's terrific story with Stephen Root as a Speedo-wearing, gun-toting judge.) So we get a lot of concentrated Raylan-Boyd time, and another tension-laden father-son moment 'twixt Raylan and Arlo, and Raylan asking Winona to look after a drunk and bitter Ava, and Bo wandering around plotting and scheming and prepping trouble for everyone. Big trouble coming in the final two episodes, I'm sure. Can't wait."

Scott Tobias of The A.V. Club gave the episode a "B" grade and wrote, "All in all, a fine enough episode, with a few standout moments — the Arlo/Bo scene, the chilling way the two loose ends from the meth lab explosion are dispatched, and the great running joke about Dewey's 'onanism' — and the usual sparkling dialogue. But it mostly feels like throat-clearing for the two episodes to comes. Stay tuned..."

Luke Dwyer of TV Fanatic gave the episode a 4 star rating out of 5 and wrote, "The writers of the Lost's season finale could learn a thing or two from watching the final episodes of Justified's first season. Perhaps I am jumping the gun a bit. After all, Lost worked well all the way up until the uncharacteristically safe series finale earlier this week. With two episodes to go, Lost seemed like it was going to tie up a lot of its loose ends just like Justified started last night. But, there are still two episodes of Justified left and it may well dissolve into a simple ending as Lost did. Here's hoping it does not."
