= Hatless =

- Justified episode
- Episode no.: Season 1 Episode 9
- Directed by: Peter Werner
- Written by: Dave Andron
- Cinematography by: Edward J. Pei & Francis Kenny
- Editing by: Bill Johnson
- Original air date: May 11, 2010
- Running time: 41 minutes

Guest appearances
- Malik Yoba as Toby Griffin; Jere Burns as Wynn Duffy; David Eigenberg as Arnold Pinter; Steven Flynn as Emmitt Arnett; Tom Kiesche as Drunk #1; William Ragsdale as Gary Hawkins; Travis Wester as Billy Mac

Episode chronology
← Previous "Blowback"	Next → "The Hammer"
- Justified (season 1)

"Hatless" is the ninth episode of the first season of the American Neo-Western television series Justified. It is the 9th overall episode of the series and was written by Dave Andron and directed by Peter Werner. It originally aired on FX on May 11, 2010.

The series is based on Elmore Leonard's stories about the character Raylan Givens, particularly "Fire in the Hole", which serves as the basis for the episode. The series follows Raylan Givens, a tough deputy U.S. Marshal enforcing his own brand of justice. Following the shooting of a mob hitman, Raylan is sent to Lexington, Kentucky to investigate an old childhood friend Boyd Crowder, who is now part of a white supremacist gang. In the episode, Raylan is temporarily suspended from the Marshal's service and decides to use his free time to go head-to-head with the gangsters who are bothering Winona's new husband. Despite being credited, Nick Searcy, Joelle Carter, Jacob Pitts, and Erica Tazel do not appear in the episode, making it the episode with the fewest cast members of the show.

According to Nielsen Media Research, the episode was seen by an estimated 2.09 million household viewers and gained a 0.8/2 ratings share among adults aged 18–49. The episode received positive reviews from critics, with critics praising Olyphant's and Zea's performances in the episode as well as the guest stars.

== Plot ==
Raylan (Timothy Olyphant) has been suspended from the Marshal's service. He gets himself into a fight at a bar with two patrons after they make derogatory comments about a woman. The bar owner threatens the men to leave the bar and one of them steals Raylan's hat. Winona (Natalie Zea) arrives at the bar and takes a wounded Raylan to his hotel room. While tending his wounds, she confronts him about meeting with Gary (William Ragsdale) on his job and brings up Wynn Duffy (Jere Burns), who showed up at her house.

Gary meets with a friend and retired football player, Toby Griffin (Malik Yoba), asking for help in getting money. He explains that as the result of a failed property investment he is "almost seven figures" in debt to Duffy. Toby declines his request, wanting to avoid problems although he accepts to help as "muscle". Raylan visits Duffy, threatening him to stay away from Gary and Winona. Shortly after he leaves, Gary and Toby arrive to talk with Duffy. Gary then boldly tells Duffy that he will double his owed money in 24 months. Raylan asks Arnold Pinter (David Eigenberg) for help in finding more about Duffy; he reveals that Duffy works for a man named Emmitt Arnett (Steven Flynn) in the Dixie Mafia. Later that night, both Gary and Toby are attacked by Duffy and enforcer Billy Mac (Travis Wester). Duffy tells Gary to his money by the next day or he will kill Winona.

Raylan intercepts Billy Mac in his apartment and forces him to reveal his plan to kidnap Winona. Raylan then takes Winona out of her house, revealing Gary's association with Duffy and the Mafia. Raylan then finds Gary at the place where he planned to make a mall, intending to kill himself. Raylan reminds him that Winona will not receive life insurance if he commits suicide and talks him out of it. The next day, they confront Duffy and Arnett at their office. Gary then settles his debt by handing over the development property, which Arnett accepts. Duffy is furious at this as he will not receive money and draws his gun at them. This leads to a shootout which culminates in Arnett's guards dying and Duffy getting wounded. Raylan then takes Gary to his house, where he is reunited with Winona. Raylan then returns to the bar where he has the thugs return his hat.

== Production ==
=== Writing ===
Jere Burns said that his character, Wynn Duffy, was supposed to die in the episode.

== Reception ==
=== Viewers ===
In its original American broadcast, "Hatless" was seen by an estimated 2.09 million household viewers and gained a 0.8/2 ratings share among adults aged 18–49, according to Nielsen Media Research. This means that 0.8 percent of all households with televisions watched the episode, while 2 percent of all households watching television at that time watched it. This was a 16% decrease in viewership from the previous episode, which was watched by 2.46 million viewers with a 0.9/3 in the 18-49 demographics.

=== Critical reviews ===
"Hatless" received positive reviews from critics. Seth Amitin of IGN gave the episode a "great" 8.5 out of 10 rating and wrote, "It still doesn't seem like the show is heading anywhere in particular. It has great characters, it has great dialogue, but where do they take us? Where is point A and where's point B? Raylan's flaws are on the verge of costing him his job, but what good does him getting fired for the show? It probably wouldn't be as interesting watching a Kentucky man get the crap beaten out of him at bars. Some of these questions might be remedied as soon as next week when the Crowder gang (and Boyd in particular) will make a large splash. Walton Goggins was even signed on for Season 2 as a full-time character, so that's great to hear. But let's get going."

Alan Sepinwall of HitFix wrote, "Just a very well-written episode, and nicely-played by Timothy Olyphant and Natalie Zea, who had to carry the episode while the Marshals, Ava and the Crowders all took the week off. We know from the episode with Raylan's dad why he's as dark as he is, but 'Hatless' helps show why Winona would have left him, no matter what created that personality."

Scott Tobias of The A.V. Club gave the episode an "A−" grade and wrote, "Nine episodes into its first season, Justified has amassed one of the most formidable line-ups of character actors on television and it's been especially effective in casting many of them against type."

Luke Dwyer of TV Fanatic gave the episode a 3.5 star rating out of 5 and wrote, "Two people took a beating and three people were shot this week on Justified and Raylan Givens had absolutely nothing to do with any of it? Apparently if you take away the man's hat, you take away his ability to cause trouble as well."
