= The Collection (Justified) =

- Justified episode
- Episode no.: Season 1 Episode 6
- Directed by: Rod Holcomb
- Written by: Graham Yost
- Cinematography by: Francis Kenny
- Editing by: Keith Henderson
- Original air date: April 20, 2010
- Running time: 41 minutes

Guest appearances
- Katherine LaNasa as Caryn Carnes; Brett Cullen as Greg Davis; Rick Gomez as Assistant United States Attorney David Vasquez; Tony Hale as David Mortimer; Peter Jason as Owen Carnes; Robert Picardo as Karl Hanselman; William Ragsdale as Gary Hawkins; Walton Goggins as Boyd Crowder

Episode chronology
← Previous "The Lord of War and Thunder"	Next → "Blind Spot"
- Justified (season 1)

"The Collection" is the sixth episode of the first season of the American Neo-Western television series Justified. It is the 6th overall episode of the series and was written by series developer Graham Yost and directed by Rod Holcomb. It originally aired on FX on April 20, 2010.

The series is based on Elmore Leonard's stories about the character Raylan Givens, particularly "Fire in the Hole", which serves as the basis for the episode. The series follows Raylan Givens, a tough deputy U.S. Marshal enforcing his own brand of justice. Following the shooting of a mob hitman, Raylan is sent to Lexington, Kentucky to investigate an old childhood friend Boyd Crowder, who is now part of a white supremacist gang. In the episode, Raylan must find a missing art collection while Winona asks him to investigate her husband Gary's business associates.

According to Nielsen Media Research, the episode was seen by an estimated 2.06 million household viewers and gained a 0.8/2 ratings share among adults aged 18–49. The episode received positive reviews from critics, although some expressed frustration with the episode's pace and lack of payoff in many subplots.

== Plot ==
Raylan (Timothy Olyphant) visits Boyd (Walton Goggins) in prison, wanting information on Arlo but Boyd does not help him. Later, while making out with Ava (Joelle Carter), Raylan warns her about Johnny's statement that Bo Crowder will soon be released from jail. Ava states she will not leave Kentucky.

Mullen (Nick Searcy) then takes Raylan to Cincinnati to investigate the case of Owen Carnes (Peter Jason), an art owner who stole money years ago. They visit his house and find that Carnes owns some of Adolf Hitler's paintings. Raylan also meets Carnes's young wife Caryn (Katherine LaNasa) and the horse trainer Greg Davis (Brett Cullen). After discovering that the paintings are false, Raylan and Mullen leave the house. Carnes, Caryn and the original painting owner David Mortimer (Tony Hale) discuss the events when Greg shows up and kills Carnes. This is part of a plan in order to avoid having to lose their money due to Carnes's actions and a missing painting.

The following day, Raylan and the deputies arrive with an arrest warrant for Carnes and find him dead, made to look like a suicide by Caryn. Raylan expresses skepticism on the scene, especially about Carnes still holding the gun after "shooting himself". Raylan meets Assistant United States Attorney David Vazquez (Rick Gomez), who says he is investigating Raylan's shootings, especially Tommy Bucks's. During the investigation, Raylan is approached by Winona (Natalie Zea), who asks for his help in running down a list of names associated with her husband Gary (William Ragsdale). Raylan accepts, although the task could negatively impact his career.

Raylan questions Caryn about the events and one of his comments throws way his suspicions, forcing Caryn and Greg to act quickly and decide to kill David to hide their tracks. David arrives at the house and is knocked unconscious by Greg. When Greg hesitates to pull the trigger, Caryn reminds them of their plan and accidentally confesses to Carnes's murder. Greg is revealed to be working with the deputies and both are arrested. Raylan finds that the gallery owner Karl Hanselman (Robert Picardo) buys and burns Hitler's paintings as a result of his father's association with him. Raylan later meets Winona at her house, where he questions the reason behind their divorce. Winona simply states feeling a connection with Gary at the time due to Raylan's job. Raylan then says that he didn't find anything suspicious with Gary's colleagues. The episode ends with Raylan paying another visit to Boyd, telling him to forget about Arlo.

== Reception ==
=== Viewers ===
In its original American broadcast, "The Collection" was seen by an estimated 2.06 million household viewers and gained a 0.8/2 ratings share among adults aged 18–49, according to Nielsen Media Research. This means that 0.8 percent of all households with televisions watched the episode, while 2 percent of all households watching television at that time watched it. This was a 15% decrease in viewership from the previous episode, which was watched by 2.41 million viewers with a 0.9/3 in the 18-49 demographics.

=== Critical reviews ===
"The Collection" received positive reviews from critics. Seth Amitin of IGN gave the episode a "good" 7.9 out of 10 rating and wrote, "The stuff Justified has built up looks good. Really good. I'm looking forward to it. The episodic plots are entertaining at least, much like this one was, and part of the problem of beginning a new show is not having the built in story that later seasons get. Justified has shown itself to be interesting enough that we can all wait a while on this."

Alan Sepinwall of The Star-Ledger wrote, "So Boyd's back, Winona needs Raylan's help, Raylan's in all kinds of trouble at work, and Ava has no interest in running away from Bo Crowder. With this many plates spinning, the show is clearly embracing its serialized qualities. Ultimately, that's a good thing."

Scott Tobias of The A.V. Club gave the episode a "B" grade and wrote, "All these ongoing subplots will surely pay off further down the line, but it was mainly a case of the writers keeping all the balls in the air. Bo's release from jail, Vasquez's prodding into Raylan's affairs, Winona's sleazy husband, Boyd's no-doubt diabolical intentions — these are developments that are intriguing enough for now, but are only just gathering steam for later in the season. That means the strength of an episode like 'The Collection' lies mainly in how well the A-plot is handled. And to that end, I'd say good not great."

Luke Dwyer of TV Fanatic gave the episode a 3.5 star rating out of 5 and wrote, "Certainly the ending to last night's Justified episode, 'The Collection' means that the show is building up to some sort of larger story, right? Perhaps a dramatic season finale that wraps up the five minutes dedicated out of every episode to multi-episode stories and characters? This isn't a complaint, just something I'm curious about. In fact, because this is the first season of Justified part of the fun has been figuring out how the show is going to progress."
