= Fire in the Hole (Justified) =

- Justified episode
- Episode no.: Season 1 Episode 1
- Directed by: Michael Dinner
- Teleplay by: Graham Yost
- Cinematography by: Edward J. Pei
- Editing by: Victor Du Bois
- Original air date: March 16, 2010
- Running time: 51 minutes

Guest appearances
- Joelle Carter as Ava Crowder; Natalie Zea as Winona Hawkins; Damon Herriman as Dewey Crowe; Matt Craven as Chief Deputy U.S. Marshal Dan Grant; Peter Greene as Thomas "Tommy Bucks" Buckley; Doug E. Doug as Israel Fandi; Kevin Rankin as Derek "Devil" Lennox; Ryan O'Nan as Jared Hale; Joel Marsh Garland as Pork #2; Daniel Stewart-Sherman as Pork #1; Walton Goggins as Boyd Crowder

Episode chronology
← Previous —	Next → "Riverbrook"
- Justified (season 1)

"Fire in the Hole" is the series premiere of the American Neo-Western television series Justified. The episode was written by series developer Graham Yost and directed by Michael Dinner. It originally aired on FX on March 16, 2010.

The series is based on Elmore Leonard's stories about the character Raylan Givens, particularly "Fire in the Hole", which serves as the basis for the episode. The series follows Raylan Givens, a tough deputy U.S. Marshal enforcing his own brand of justice. Following the shooting of a mob hitman, Raylan is transferred to his home state of Kentucky to investigate an old childhood friend Boyd Crowder, who is supposedly now part of a white supremacist gang.

According to Nielsen Media Research, the episode was seen by an estimated 4.16 million household viewers and gained a 1.5 ratings share among adults aged 18–49. It was the highest rated show of the night in basic cable and it was also FX's second highest-rated series premiere, behind The Shield. The episode received extremely positive reviews from critics, who particularly praised its "sharp" dialogue and acting.

== Plot ==
In Miami, Deputy U.S. Marshal Raylan Givens (Timothy Olyphant) approaches mob hitman Tommy Bucks (Peter Greene) at one of his parties. Raylan presses Bucks with his deal where he was supposed to leave the city within twenty-four hours (a time limit up in a few minutes) lest Raylan "shoot him on sight". Bucks pulls out a gun, but Raylan quickly draws and kills Bucks in self-defense.

The shooting sparks an investigation by Raylan's superiors, despite Raylan insisting that Bucks pulled the gun first. His boss, Chief Deputy U.S. Marshal Dan Grant (Matt Craven), decides to transfer Raylan to the Eastern District of Kentucky based in Lexington. As it is the jurisdiction of which covers Raylan's childhood home of Harlan County; Raylan is reluctant to take the transfer.

In Lexington, Raylan meets with Deputy Chief Art Mullen (Nick Searcy), an old colleague from the academy, and is introduced to his colleagues Tim Gutterson (Jacob Pitts) and Rachel Brooks (Erica Tazel). Mullen assigns Raylan to investigate Raylan's childhood friend, Boyd Crowder (Walton Goggins), who has supposedly become a white supremacist. That night, Boyd and his colleague Jared Hale (Ryan O'Nan) drive to an African-American church, which Boyd blows up with a rocket-propelled grenade. Mistakenly suspecting Hale of being an informant, Boyd kills him in their getaway vehicle.

Raylan connects Hale's murder to the church bombing, as Boyd used the phrase "fire in the hole" before launching the rocket–a common phrase he used when he and Raylan were coal miners. Meanwhile, after Boyd's brother Bowman is killed by his wife Ava (Joelle Carter), Raylan visits her house in Harlan as an old friend. Ava defends her actions as her relationship with Bowman was previously abusive, although he was unarmed when she killed him. Boyd's associate Dewey Crowe (Damon Herriman) arrives to take Ava, but Raylan forces him out and threatens him to tell Boyd he wants to have a talk.

Raylan meets with Boyd at his church, where he deduces that Boyd is not actually a white supremacist, but rather using their forces as distraction for his own bank-robbing spree; Boyd targeted the "church" (a front for distributing marijuana) after being paid to do so by a rival gang. Raylan has Boyd show up the next day at the station for a suspect line-up. However, the church's pastor, marijuana kingpin Israel Fandi (Doug E. Doug) does not identify Boyd and he has to be released. Boyd tells Raylan that he knows about the Miami shooting and gives him a similar ultimatum: Raylan must leave Harlan County or Boyd will kill him. That night, Ava calls Raylan when Boyd unexpectedly shows up at her house. Raylan drives there but his team is caught in a gunfight with Boyd's men. He then catches Dewey and Derek "Devil" Lennox (Kevin Rankin) following him; he handcuffs them in their car before reaching Ava's house.

At Ava's house, over dinner, Boyd expresses his intent to kill Raylan in the same way he killed Tommy Bucks. However, Ava arrives with a shotgun aimed at Boyd, prompting him to reach for his gun. Raylan then shoots Boyd in the chest, seriously wounding him and putting him in the hospital. That night, Raylan visits the home of his ex-wife Winona Hawkins (Natalie Zea), scaring her new husband, Gary. He talks to Winona about the shooting of Tommy Bucks, pondering if he would've killed Bucks had he not drawn the gun first. Winona then remarks that Raylan is the angriest man she ever met.

== Production ==
=== Development ===
Justified (originally titled Lawman) was given a 13-episode order by FX on July 28, 2009, announcing Graham Yost as developer and Timothy Olyphant as the main character, Raylan Givens. The first episode was referred to as the "Fire in the Hole pilot" during shooting and retains this as the name of the episode itself.

=== Casting ===
The character of Boyd Crowder was intended to die in the episode, but Yost kept the character when test audiences liked Walton Goggins's performance. Goggins would later be promoted to main cast from season 2 onward. Yost would later comment on the decision by the time the series ended in 2015, "I think it would have been a bummer. That was part of it, too. We wanted the show to be entertaining for six years. That was always our goal, and it's not really a tragedy. We felt this was the right way."

Yost also explained that Dewey was supposed to die in the episode but the network told him to change plans, "the uproar was such that it was loud and clear that Dewey must not die until Dewey absolutely has to die." Both Natalie Zea and Joelle Carter were credited as guest stars in the pilot and were promoted to series regulars beginning with the second episode.

=== Filming ===
While the episode was shot in Pittsburgh and suburban Kittanning, Pennsylvania and Washington, Pennsylvania, the subsequent episodes were shot in California. The small town of Green Valley, California often doubles for Harlan, Kentucky. Pittsburgh's David L. Lawrence Convention Center appears on film as the small town "airport" and the construction of the new Consol Energy Center serves as the "new courthouse".

== Reception ==
=== Viewers ===
In its original American broadcast, "Fire in the Hole" was seen by an estimated 4.16 million household viewers and gained a 1.5 ratings share among adults aged 18–49, according to Nielsen Media Research. This means that 1.5 percent of all households with televisions watched the episode. It was the highest rated show of the night in basic cable and it was also FX's second highest-rated series premiere, behind The Shield in 2002. It remains the series' most watched episode. Before its premiere, TV by the Numbers called the show "a lock to be renewed", citing the network's Damages's dwindling ratings and the announced ending of veteran shows like Nip/Tuck and Rescue Me. FX would later renew the show in May 2010.

=== Critical reviews ===
"Fire in the Hole" received extremely positive reviews from critics. Seth Amitin of IGN gave the episode an "amazing" 9 out of 10 rating and wrote, "This show could have a great four or five-season run if everything comes together for it, and maybe snag a few Emmy's along the way. Timothy Olyphant has found a good home and I hope he keeps it for a while. It looks like FX has another winner."

Alan Sepinwall of The Star-Ledger praised the episode, "The pilot, in which Yost liberally borrows Leonard's trademark lean dialogue from "Fire in the Hole", has a swagger to it, and also a sly sense of humor."

Scott Tobias of The A.V. Club gave the episode an "A" grade and wrote, "It will be telling, in the weeks to come, if Justified can develop the world beyond its magnetic center — or if it will even leave Raylan's side at all. But for now, this is terrifically promising television, with an irresistible fish-out-of-water hook and a hero of deceptive simplicity." Alyssa Rosenberg of The Atlantic wrote, "There's a lot of humor and potential and actual sex and violence Kentucky, it turns out. If Raylan and his Stetson can avoid crowding the screen, our visit there with him may turn out to be more than worth our while."

Luke Dwyer of TV Fanatic gave the episode a 3.5 star rating out of 5 and wrote, "A lot of meaning can be drawn out of the title of the series premiere of Justified, 'Fire in the Hole.' First, and obviously, it speaks to what Boyd says to the people standing outside of the church before he fires his rocket launcher to blow up the building. The moment and decision by Boyd was an interesting one because, although it happened early in the show, it demonstrates a human side to someone already painted as a maniac." Nancy deWolf Smith of The Wall Street Journal wrote, "The pitch-perfection of such an hour, lush and brightly lit, is sublime."

TV Guide critic Matt Roush said, "The show is grounded in Olyphant's low-key but high-impact star-making performance, the work of a confident and cunning leading man who's always good company." Chicago Tribune critic Maureen Ryan stated, "The shaggily delightful dialogue, the deft pacing, the authentic sense of place, the rock-solid supporting cast and the feeling that you are in the hands of writers, actors and directors who really know what they're doing—all of these are worthy reasons to watch Justified."

In a more mixed review, Mike Hale of The New York Times noted the show's "modest virtues", but was critical of the first season's pace and characterization, writing: "Justified can feel so low-key that even the crisis points drift past without making much of an impression... It feels as if the attention that should have gone to the storytelling all went to the atmosphere and the repartee."
