= Bulletville =

- Justified episode
- Episode no.: Season 1 Episode 13
- Directed by: Adam Arkin
- Written by: Fred Golan
- Cinematography by: Francis Kenny
- Editing by: Keith Henderson
- Original air date: June 8, 2010
- Running time: 42 minutes

Guest appearances
- Raymond J. Barry as Arlo Givens; Alexandra Barreto as Pilar; M. C. Gainey as Bo Crowder; Omar Avila as Ernesto; David Meunier as Johnny Crowder; Ray Porter as Hestler Jones; Walton Goggins as Boyd Crowder

Episode chronology
← Previous "Fathers and Sons"	Next → "The Moonshine War"
- Justified (season 1)

"Bulletville" is the thirteenth episode and season finale of the first season of the American Neo-Western television series Justified. It is the 13th overall episode of the series and was written by co-executive producer Fred Golan and directed by Adam Arkin. It originally aired on FX on June 8, 2010.

The series is based on Elmore Leonard's stories about the character Raylan Givens, particularly "Fire in the Hole", which serves as the basis for the episode. The series follows Raylan Givens, a tough deputy U.S. Marshal enforcing his own brand of justice. Following the shooting of a mob hitman, Raylan is sent to Lexington, Kentucky to investigate an old childhood friend Boyd Crowder, who is now part of a white supremacist gang. In the episode, Bo Crowder intends to finish all loose ends with his son Boyd and with Raylan, whom the Miami cartel wants him to deliver to them. Despite being credited, Jacob Pitts and Erica Tazel do not appear in the episode.

According to Nielsen Media Research, the episode was seen by an estimated 2.03 million household viewers and gained a 0.8/2 ratings share among adults aged 18–49. The episode received critical acclaim, with critics highlighting the acting, writing, action scenes, and new storylines for the next season.

== Plot ==
Boyd (Walton Goggins) visits Ava (Joelle Carter) at her house, asking for forgiveness for his misdeeds. Ava responds by pointing a shotgun at him and telling him to never contact her again, which he agrees to do. He is picked up by Johnny (David Meunier). However, Johnny gets angry when he finds that Boyd blew up the truck and let the drivers go.

Bo (M. C. Gainey), Johnny and Bo's henchmen arrive at Boyd's camp. Bo has Johnny brutally hit Boyd, demanding to know the location of their stolen supplies. One of his follower confesses and they are forced to dig them up. Bo tells Boyd that he no longer considers him his son and tells him to leave the camp. Boyd leaves but returns when he hears gunshots. He returns and finds his followers hanging in trees, all dead. A grief-stricken Boyd buries their corpses in the woods and then questions his belief in God, asking how could He let it happen. He asks for a sign from God but receives no response.

Raylan (Timothy Olyphant) and Mullen (Nick Searcy) learn about the truck incident and notify Arlo (Raymond J. Barry) that he will cooperate with the Marshals, the FBI and the DEA. Arlo shares this information with Bo, who tells him that his contacts in Miami want Arlo to bring Raylan to them. That night, Raylan meets Arlo at his hotel room. Arlo tries to pull his gun but Raylan already took his gun out, revealing that he knows about Arlo's betrayal. He shoots Arlo in the arm and then kills two hitmen sent to retrieve him. Meanwhile, Johnny and Bo kidnap Ava at her house. But Bo shoots Johnny in the chest for tipping Boyd about the truck, intending to make his murder look like Ava shot him and then fled.

While waiting for an ambulance and tending Arlo's wounds, Raylan is visited by Boyd, who now feels lost without a purpose. Raylan is then called by Bo through Ava's cellphone, telling him to meet them at a certain location alone or he will kill Ava. Boyd then offers to accompany him as he knows the location and Raylan accepts. Raylan drives to a cabin in the woods where he meets with Bo while Boyd sneaks behind the cabin and kills Ava's captor. This distraction allows Raylan to kill Bo's henchman and Boyd targets his father, intending to kill him for the death of his men. However, a sniper suddenly kills Bo and wounds Boyd, forcing Raylan and Boyd to hide in the cabin.

The Miami gunrunners are behind the attack and corner Raylan, Boyd and Ava in the cabin. Raylan manages to kill all but two hitmen. They say they only want Raylan and are willing to let Boyd and Ava leave. Raylan "surrenders" but Boyd kills one of the hitmen while the other one escapes in her car. Raylan prepares to chase after her, only to be pointed by Boyd with a gun. Boyd intends to chase her for killing Bo, telling Raylan that he is "the only friend I have left in this world." As Boyd rides off in the car, Raylan pulls his gun and pretends to shoot, suggesting they'll always be allies and enemies.

== Reception ==
=== Viewers ===
In its original American broadcast, "Bulletville" was seen by an estimated 2.03 million household viewers and gained a 0.8/2 ratings share among adults aged 18–49, according to Nielsen Media Research. This means that 0.8 percent of all households with televisions watched the episode, while 2 percent of all households watching television at that time watched it. This was a 5% decrease in viewership from the previous episode, which was watched by 2.13 million viewers with a 0.8/2 in the 18-49 demographics.

=== Critical reviews ===
"Bulletville" received critical acclaim from critics. Seth Amitin of IGN gave the episode an "amazing" 9 out of 10 rating and wrote, "Season 1 had a lot of ebb and flow to it, and ultimately its ending wrapped up a lot. Season 1 was poetic in its lyrical dialogue, confusing relationships and mix between good and bad within family lines. The finale hit on all of these cylinders and reminded even those who lost faith after the premiere that Justified can be very, very good."

James Poniewozik of Time wrote, "In general, a strong season end, and a promising series start, for a modern-day Western that showed it could blow you away even when its guns were holstered." Ken Tucker of Entertainment Weekly wrote, "Justified finished out its first season in a way that tied up loose ends, gave us at least one action sequence that could be taught in film schools, and set up a few story lines for next season that should leave anyone who developed a hankering for this show yearning for more, now."

Scott Tobias of The A.V. Club gave the episode an "A" grade and wrote, "Shows often take some time finding their voice, but Justified was the rare case of one that hit its groove in the pilot and never looked back. I was a little concerned at first that it would settle into a formulaic (albeit flavorful) crime-of-the-week procedural, but it's turned out to be a nice hybrid of episodic and serialized television, loaded with nuanced and colorful characters, moral ambiguity, great dialogue and regional touches, and a parade of outstanding veteran actors."

Luke Dwyer of TV Fanatic gave the episode a 4.8 star rating out of 5 and wrote, "Season one of Justified wrapped up last night with the season finale 'Bulletville' and the show certainly lived up to the name. Beyond the proliferation of violence punctuated by gun shots, we were treated to a well done episode of television that skillfully wrapped up a number of major story lines while leaving us open ended for the start of season two this fall."

In a more mixed review, Alan Sepinwall of HitFix wrote, "I've loved this season of Justified, but I didn't love the finale – as a finale, at least. As just an episode of this show, it had a lot of great moments, but as the culmination of the story Graham Yost and company have been telling for the last three months, it felt lacking."
