= The Lord of War and Thunder =

- Justified episode
- Episode no.: Season 1 Episode 5
- Directed by: Jon Avnet
- Written by: Gary Lennon
- Cinematography by: Peter Levy
- Editing by: Victor Du Bois
- Original air date: April 13, 2010
- Running time: 42 minutes

Guest appearances
- Linda Gehringer as Helen Givens; Rick Gomez as Assistant United States Attorney David Vasquez; Eddie Jemison as Stan Perkins; Brent Sexton as Sheriff Hunter Mosley; Karina Logue as Sonya Toomey; David Meunier as Johnny Crowder; Raymond J. Barry as Arlo Givens

Episode chronology
← Previous "Long in the Tooth"	Next → "The Collection"
- Justified (season 1)

"The Lord of War and Thunder" is the fifth episode of the first season of the American Neo-Western television series Justified. It is the 5th overall episode of the series and was written by producer Gary Lennon and directed by Jon Avnet. It originally aired on FX on April 13, 2010.

The series is based on Elmore Leonard's stories about the character Raylan Givens, particularly "Fire in the Hole", which serves as the basis for the episode. The series follows Raylan Givens, a tough deputy U.S. Marshal enforcing his own brand of justice. Following the shooting of a mob hitman, Raylan is sent to Lexington, Kentucky to investigate an old childhood friend Boyd Crowder, who is now part of a white supremacist gang. In the episode, Raylan must deal with his father when he finds himself involved with a man who claims he owes him money for illegal activities. Despite being credited, Jacob Pitts does not appear in the episode.

According to Nielsen Media Research, the episode was seen by an estimated 2.41 million household viewers and gained a 0.9/3 ratings share among adults aged 18–49. The episode received very positive reviews from critics, who praised the character development and performances (particularly Olyphant's and Barry's).

== Plot ==
Raylan (Timothy Olyphant) and his team are surveilling a house which is said to guard a criminal named Wilson Toomey but fail to properly see if he is inside the house and are denied access by the homeowner. Meanwhile, that night, Raylan's father Arlo (Raymond J. Barry) vandalizes the house belonging to Stan Perkins (Eddie Jemison), who owes him money. After Arlo attacks Stan, Sheriff Hunter Mosley (Brent Sexton) arrests Arlo.

Raylan and Ava sleep together. Later, Raylan is told of the arrest by his step-mother, "Aunt" Helen (Linda Gehringer), who wants him to bail him out. He goes to Harlan County to release his father. He takes him home and finds that Stan and his nephews broke in the house, claiming that Arlo stole from them. Raylan talks with Stan and asks him to call him whenever Arlo asks for rent, before returning to Lexington. Arlo decides to take matters on his hands and attacks Stan's nephews with a baseball bat but then suffers a heart attack.

In Lexington, Ava (Joelle Carter) is questioned by Assistant United States Attorney David Vasquez (Rick Gomez) for her role in Boyd's shooting. The court reporter turns out to be Winona (Natalie Zea), but seeing that Raylan is involved, asks to be excluded from the case. After solving the case of the house, Raylan is called back to Harlan after learning of Arlo's heart attack. He is told by Helen that Arlo had a similar attack just two years ago and was diagnosed with PTSD and bipolar disorder. Raylan talks with his father, who made Raylan live in fear growing up and who was constantly involved in some sort of scheme. Arlo in part blames his behavior on his own father, who was a religious man who created a house of fear.

Raylan then contacts Boyd's cousin, Johnny (David Meunier), who reveals that Stan was involved in smuggling Oxycodone. He also reveals that Boyd's father, Bo, will soon be released from jail and Ava should leave Kentucky or face consequences for killing Bowman. Raylan confronts Stan and discovers that Arlo planned to use him as a shield and stole from Stan earlier in the episode. Arlo's plan worked, as Raylan finds the drugs at Stan's house and threatens him with jail if they go after Helen and Arlo again. Raylan doesn't even bother asking Arlo where the stolen Oxy or money is because he knows Arlo will not tell him.

== Reception ==
=== Viewers ===
In its original American broadcast, "The Lord of War and Thunder" was seen by an estimated 2.41 million household viewers and gained a 0.9/3 ratings share among adults aged 18–49, according to Nielsen Media Research. This means that 0.9 percent of all households with televisions watched the episode, while 3 percent of all households watching television at that time watched it. This was a 14% increase in viewership from the previous episode, which was watched by 2.10 million viewers with a 0.9/2 in the 18–49 demographics.

=== Critical reviews ===
"The Lord of War and Thunder" received very positive reviews from critics. Seth Amitin of IGN gave the episode a "great" 8.9 out of 10 rating and wrote, "I would say this episode was a great stepping stone to a much greater arc about Raylan and Arlo, but I can't say that for sure. The Justified team closed the book on that one by the end of the episode, but how unlikely is it that we never see Arlo again? Regardless, it made for some really interesting stuff. Arlo was an entertaining a-hole — an unreliable narrator if ever there was one — and what we saw of him in Raylan gave us a sustaining tidbit into our favorite character. I hope we get more of this in the future."

Alan Sepinwall of The Star-Ledger wrote, "After the last few episodes were largely self-contained adventures of Raylan and the other Marshals, 'The Lord of War and Thunder' suggested that Justified may have room for some longer-term storytelling, after all. And I liked the way this episode flipped the format, with the more serialized and personal plots taking the forefront but with an engaging, and brief, episodic story about Raylan playing gardener to catch a fugitive. If the series can be fluid about its format - standalone-only if the story's good enough to carry the hour, and a mix when it's not - I'll be very pleased."

Scott Tobias of The A.V. Club gave the episode an "A−" grade and wrote, "Though engaging all the way through, 'The Lord Of War And Thunder' didn't really get its hooks into me until the final 15 minutes or so, with Raylan and Arlo finally got to mix it up at the hospital and Raylan figured out Arlo's elaborate (and fiendishly clever) plan to deceive his son and walk away $75,000 richer. But my favorite scene was Raylan's questioning of Perkins in the rented house, where he slipped in a rather sad anecdote about his childhood while getting to the bottom of the case. In miniature, the scene proved Justified could do two things at once: Add new depths to its characters and still tell a gripping yarn. Here's hoping it continues moving forward, even in baby steps."

Luke Dwyer of TV Fanatic gave the episode a 3.5 star rating out of 5 and wrote, "House is generally a week to week show, but with some longer story arcs to keep viewers interested for an entire season. Considering the similarities between Raylan and House and the first five episodes of Justified, if this is the direction that the writers are going, that's a good one. The main difference between House and Justified so far is that Justified has not yet developed the supporting characters that make House an excellent show."
