= Fathers and Sons (Justified) =

- Justified episode
- Episode no.: Season 1 Episode 12
- Directed by: Michael Katleman
- Written by: Dave Andron
- Cinematography by: Francis Kenny
- Editing by: Victor Du Bois
- Original air date: June 1, 2010
- Running time: 40 minutes

Guest appearances
- Raymond J. Barry as Arlo Givens; Alexandra Barreto as Pilar; Jordi Caballero as Gio Reyes; Mo Gaffney as Sheriff; M. C. Gainey as Bo Crowder; Linda Gehringer as Helen Givens; Rick Gomez as AUSA David Vasquez; William Ragsdale as Gary Hawkins; David Meunier as Johnny Crowder; Ray Porter as Hestler Jones; Omar Avila as Ernesto; Joshua Bitton as Lucky; Pat Skipper as Reverend; Walton Goggins as Boyd Crowder

Episode chronology
← Previous "Veterans"	Next → "Bulletville"
- Justified (season 1)

"Fathers and Sons" is the twelfth episode of the first season of the American Neo-Western television series Justified. It is the 12th overall episode of the series and was written by Dave Andron and directed by Michael Katleman. It originally aired on FX on June 1, 2010.

The series is based on Elmore Leonard's stories about the character Raylan Givens, particularly "Fire in the Hole", which serves as the basis for the episode. The series follows Raylan Givens, a tough deputy U.S. Marshal enforcing his own brand of justice. Following the shooting of a mob hitman, Raylan is sent to Lexington, Kentucky to investigate an old childhood friend Boyd Crowder, who is now part of a white supremacist gang. In the episode, Raylan wants his dad to work against Bo in order to expose him but Arlo has other plans. Despite being credited, Erica Tazel does not appear in the episode.

According to Nielsen Media Research, the episode was seen by an estimated 2.13 million household viewers and gained a 0.8/2 ratings share among adults aged 18–49. The episode received very positive reviews from critics, who praised the writing and the inclusion of all storylines towards the season finale.

== Plot ==
Talking with Raylan (Timothy Olyphant) and Mullen (Nick Searcy), Arlo (Raymond J. Barry) confesses his association to Bo Crowder (M. C. Gainey) through skimming operations. Raylan and Mullen want Arlo to act as a "snitch" for them, which Arlo reluctantly agrees to do for an immunity deal. However, Arlo refuses to use a wire and lashes out at Raylan before leaving the office.

In Miami, Bo meets with Gio Reyes (Jordi Caballero), a drug kingpin. Reyes warns Bo to take care of Raylan, as he has been a problem for him since he killed Tommy Bucks. Bo later buys a warehouse for his henchmen. Ava (Joelle Carter) leaves Winona's (Natalie Zea) house and returns to her own. However, Bo has directed his henchmen to stay there, as it is still Bowman's house. Winona visits Raylan in his hotel room and they end up having sex. Afterwards, she leaves, not knowing that Ava is watching from afar. Ava later takes a shotgun and visits Bo at his club, threatening him to stop harassing her. Bo tells her to leave Kentucky but Ava refuses.

Bo expresses disgust at Boyd's newfound religion and growing members of his team. At the Veterans of Foreign Wars offices, a man named Lucky (Joshua Bitton) threatens to detonate a grenade in the building. Arlo is with him and talks to him to abandon his plan. Meeting with Raylan, Arlo tells him he will use the wire. He meets with Bo but unknown to the Marshals, warns Bo about the wire. They play along a charade and Bo instructs Arlo to meet him the next day. He also tells Arlo to tell Raylan about Ava's threat. Raylan confronts Ava in her house but she calls him out for sleeping with Winona and states she has no intention of leaving Kentucky.

Later that night, a truck carrying Bo's drug supplies is intercepted in the street by Boyd and his henchmen, with Boyd using a rocket-propelled grenade to destroy the truck.

== Reception ==
=== Viewers ===
In its original American broadcast, "Fathers and Sons" was seen by an estimated 2.13 million household viewers and gained a 0.8/2 ratings share among adults aged 18–49, according to Nielsen Media Research. This means that 0.8 percent of all households with televisions watched the episode, while 2 percent of all households watching television at that time watched it. This was a 17% increase in viewership from the previous episode, which was watched by 1.81 million viewers with a 0.7/2 in the 18-49 demographics.

=== Critical reviews ===
"Fathers and Sons" received very positive reviews from critics. Seth Amitin of IGN gave the episode a "great" 8.6 out of 10 rating and wrote, "The connection between Bo and Boyd and Raylan and Arlo was brought up a second time and we got it, it's just not as interesting as the story itself. I think maybe the creative team oversells the show's subtleties, though maybe this one was just a simple miscommunication. The show survives without harping too much on this and the season's main story arc is finally coming to a wrap next episode. Let's hope Justified can deliver a great finale."

Alan Sepinwall of HitFix wrote, "Did I miss anything or anyone? We're getting awfully busy as we head into next week's finale – which has the apt-sounding title of 'Bulletville' – and it's impressive how all the different storylines are converging into one big mess of trouble for our man with the big hat."

Scott Tobias of The A.V. Club gave the episode an "A" grade and wrote, "Overall, a superb episode, easily one of the best so far. And indication that the groundwork laid carefully throughout the season — even in mostly episodic hours — is starting to bear fruit. That's good writing."

Luke Dwyer of TV Fanatic gave the episode a 4 star rating out of 5 and wrote, "This week's episode entitled 'Fathers and Sons' focused on the deteriorating relationship between two pairs of fathers and sons: Raylan and his father Arlo and Boyd and his father Bo. What was particularly interesting about this episode and the development of the two relationships is two-fold."
