= Broken Arrow (1996 film) =

1996 American action film by John Woo

- Theatrical release poster
- Directed by: John Woo
- Written by: Graham Yost
- Produced by: Mark Gordon; Bill Badalato; Terence Chang
- Starring: John Travolta; Christian Slater; Samantha Mathis; Delroy Lindo; Frank Whaley; Bob Gunton; Howie Long
- Cinematography: Peter Levy
- Edited by: Joe Hutshing; Steve Mirkovich; John Wright
- Music by: Hans Zimmer
- Production company: The Mark Gordon Company; WCG Entertainment Productions
- Distributed by: 20th Century Fox
- Release date: February 9, 1996
- Running time: 108 minutes
- Country: United States
- Language: English
- Budget: $50 million
- Box office: $150.2 million

Broken Arrow is a 1996 American action film directed by John Woo, written by Graham Yost, and starring John Travolta, Christian Slater, Samantha Mathis and Delroy Lindo. The plot follows the theft of two American nuclear weapons, and the attempts of U.S. military authorities to recover them.

Broken Arrow was John Woo's second American film, following 1993's Hard Target. It was released by 20th Century Fox on February 9, 1996. The film had a mixed critical reception but was a commercial success, grossing $150.2 million against a $50 million budget.

== Plot ==
During a secret exercise, United States Air Force Major Vic "Deak" Deakins attacks co-pilot Captain Riley Hale aboard a stealth bomber carrying two nuclear bombs. Deakins ejects Hale and jettisons the unarmed bombs. Reporting that Hale has gone rogue, Deakins ejects, and the plane crashes in Glen Canyon national park, Utah.

Colonel Max Wilkins sends a Pararescue team to resolve a "Broken Arrow" (the military's term for missing nuclear weapons) under the supervision of Department of Defense agent Giles Prentice. The team locates the warheads in a canyon, but is ambushed by mercenaries and betrayed by Master Sergeant Kelly, who is in league with Deakins who arrives with Pritchett, the mercenaries' financier. They plan to use the weapons to blackmail the American government.

Hale convinces park ranger Terry Carmichael to help track Deakins down, and they bring down a search and rescue helicopter flown by mercenaries trying to kill Hale. Deakins' surviving men drive the warheads out in a Humvees. Hale and Carmichael carjack the Humvee and escape to a nearby abandoned copper mine, to find Deakins is using the mine as a checkpoint. Hale attempt to disable a warhead, but Deakins reveals via radio that it's programmed to activate if tampered with. Hale and Carmichael take the armed warhead into the mine to contain the nuclear blast. Deakins' team meanwhile secures the second warhead and moves into the mine where a gun battle erupts. Deakins accelerates the countdown of the armed warhead and sabotages the keypad to prevent further disarmament attempts. Hale and Carmichael escape the mine via an underground river.

When the bomb detonates, a nuclear electromagnetic pulse downs an approaching NEST helicopter, allowing Deakins to escape. When Pritchett reveals a lack of confidence in the plan, Deakins kills him and drives off with Kelly. Carmichael and Hale track the mercenaries to the motorboat they plan to transport the remaining bomb on. Carmichael hides on the boat and military forces rescue Hale.

Deakins broadcasts a ransom demand and Carmichael stows away on a train Deakin is using to transport the warhead to Denver. She kills one of the mercenaries and tries to sabotage the warhead, but Deakins arms it. Hale arrives by helicopter and saves Carmichael before Deakins can kill her. Wilkins is killed when the helicopter is shot down, but many of the mercenaries are killed by the crash. Hale sabotages Deakins' helicopter, stranding him with Kelly near the bomb. Deakins accelerates the countdown timer out of spite, and Hale engages in a gun battle with him. Kelly falls from a bridge to his death.

Carmichael detaches the section of the train with the bomb, and kills the engineer who falls on the brakes. The detached boxcars begin to catch up and Deakins uses the remote detonator to force Hale to drop his gun. Deakins challenges him to a fistfight, and Hale overpowers Deakins, acquires the remote detonator, disarms the warhead, and leaps from the train. Carmichael jumps from the train and the boxcars collide with it, hurtling the warhead toward Deakins. The warhead carries Deakins into a stack of oil barrels, the train derails and Deakins dies in the resulting explosion.

Hale and Carmichael embrace and formally introduce themselves for the first time.

== Cast ==
- John Travolta as Maj. Vic "Deak" Deakins
- Christian Slater as Cpt. Riley Hale
- Samantha Mathis as Park Ranger Terry Carmichael
- Delroy Lindo as Col. Max Wilkins
- Frank Whaley as Giles Prentice
- Bob Gunton as Mr. Pritchett
- Howie Long as MSgt. Kelly
- Jack Thompson as the Chairman of the Joint Chiefs of Staff
- Kurtwood Smith as Secretary of Defense Baird
- Vondie Curtis-Hall as CMSgt. Sam Rhodes
- Daniel von Bargen as Gen. Creely
- Shaun Toub as Max

Other actors in the film include Chris Mulkey as Major Hunt, Carmen Argenziano as General Biggs, James G. MacDonald as Park Ranger Baker, Vyto Ruginis as Johnson, Casey Biggs as Novacek, Gary Epper as Miller, and French Stewart as an I.R. Crewman.

== Production ==
In July 1993, it was reported that 20th Century Fox had made a deal with Speed screenwriter Graham Yost for his next script later revealed to be Broken Arrow and also produced by Speed producer Mark Gordon.

Principal photography began on April 26, 1995. Some filming took place in and around the mountain areas of Glen Canyon National Recreation Area in Kane County, Utah. The lake scene was filmed at Lake Powell. The desert sequences were shot in the Mojave Desert near Barstow, California, and in Coconino County near Page, Arizona. The climax with Deakins and his men on the train, including the sequence with Deakins and Hale fighting in the train car, was filmed on the privately owned Central Montana Rail, Inc. (CM) in Fergus County between Lewistown, Montana, and Denton, Montana.

In July 1995, a number of elaborate train cars were sent to the location in Lewistown, including several custom-built cars. Six weeks of filming on the forty mile track were required to capture all the stunts, helicopter action, gun battles, high falls and special effects sequences. Production photography was completed on August 28, 1995.

John Travolta was originally the choice to portray Riley Hale (played by Christian Slater), but was chosen instead to portray Major Vic Deakins. Travolta was paid $7 million for his role.

In a retrospective interview, John Woo said he was initially “a little nervous” because John Travolta “had never seen any of [his] films.” He explained that Quentin Tarantino introduced Travolta to The Killer, leading the actor to say, “I want to be Chow Yun-Fat!”, which influenced his performance in Broken Arrow. Woo also noted creative differences with the stunt coordinator, who “didn’t like slow motion,” despite it being central to his style.

== Music ==
The original music score was composed by Hans Zimmer. An expanded double-disc limited set of the music score was released by La-La Land Records in February 2011.

The score is considered to be one of Zimmer's best action scores by fans and film critics.The opening track, "Rope-A-Dope", also known as "Deakin's Theme", has been widely used in other films and media, including Scream 2 (for David Arquette's character Dewey Riley) and Speed 2. The famous riff from "Rope-A-Dope" was played by guitarist Duane Eddy, who Zimmer brought in for the entire Broken Arrow scoring session.

Zimmer said: "It was "big man" music. The guitar sound as well. I always thought Ennio [Morricone] wanted to work with Duane Eddy. So I just got the real Duane Eddy. In the score, you'll hear him plucking away. And it was great fun." He concludes by: "My intent was just make the film fun, when there's no real story to tell."

== Reception ==
=== Box office ===
Broken Arrow was No. 1 at the North American box office on its opening weekend grossing $15.6 million. It stayed on top for a second week and ultimately had a domestic gross of $70,770,147 and an international gross of $79,500,000, for a total worldwide gross of $150,270,147.

=== Critical response ===
Based on 35 reviews collected by the film review aggregator Rotten Tomatoes, 54% of critics gave Broken Arrow a positive review (19 "Fresh"; 16 "Rotten"), with an average rating of 5.7 out of 10. The site's consensus states: "John Woo adds pyrotechnic glaze to John Travolta's hammy performance, but fans may find Broken Arrow to be a dispiritingly disposable English-language entry for the action auteur." Metacritic, which assigns a normalized rating out of top reviews from mainstream critics, calculated an average score of 61, "generally favorable" reviews based on 21 reviews. Audiences polled by CinemaScore gave the film an average grade of "B+" on an A+ to F scale.

The review on Siskel & Ebert & the Movies represents the only time Roger Ebert convinced Gene Siskel to change his mind about a film. Siskel initially gave the film a marginal "thumbs up" but changed it to a "thumbs down" after hearing Ebert's criticisms. Ebert called it "a slow, talky action thriller that plays like a homage to the Fallacy of the Talking Killer." This fallacy "occurs when all the bad guy has to do is pull the trigger, and his problems are over. Instead, he talks, and talks, until his target escapes from his predicament." Ebert queried the "purpose of a digital readout on a bomb. Who will ever see it, except in a mad bomber movie?" and summed up the film saying that it all "comes down to two guys fighting on a burning train for a channel-surfer".

In an interview with the San Francisco Chronicle, John Woo said: “I just felt too much money and time were spent on special effects and there was not much left for the story. It was rush, rush, rush. I just worked with some wrong people -- some producer wasn't that great. The only concern was about the budget.“

== See also ==
- 1996 in film
- Cinema of the United States
- List of American films of 1996
