= InSight (2011 film) =

- Film poster
- Directed by: Richard Gabai
- Written by: Aaron Ginsburg; Wade McIntyre
- Produced by: John Constantine; Richard Gabai; Larissa Michel
- Starring: Sean Patrick Flanery; Natalie Zea; Adam Baldwin; Veronica Cartwright; Christopher Lloyd
- Cinematography: Scott Peck
- Edited by: Jeff Murphy
- Music by: Marcello De Francisci; Lisa Gerrard
- Production companies: Braeburn Entertainment; Check Entertainment; G.C. Pix
- Distributed by: Phase 4 Films
- Release date: April 30, 2011 (Newport Beach)
- Running time: 92 minutes
- Country: United States
- Language: English

InSight is a 2011 American mystery thriller drama film starring Sean Patrick Flanery, Natalie Zea, Adam Baldwin, Thomas Ian Nicholas, Christopher Lloyd, Veronica Cartwright and Max Perlich.

== Plot ==
Nurse Kaitlyn (Natalie Zea), who is tending to a young stabbing victim, is accidentally electrocuted and awakens to find that she is experiencing the memories of the now-deceased woman's life.

== Cast ==
- Sean Patrick Flanery as Detective Peter Rafferty
- Natalie Zea as Kaitlyn
- Adam Baldwin as Dr. Graham Bennett
- Thomas Ian Nicholas as Stephen Geiger
- Christopher Lloyd as Shep
- Veronica Cartwright as Patricia
- Max Perlich as Detective Canto
- Juliet Landau as Dr. Lisa Rosan
- Lesley-Ann Brandt as Valerie Khoury
- Matt Knudsen as Detective Kaz
- Rick Overton as Detective Gehrke
- Daniel Roebuck as Sergeant Reed
- Rance Howard as Cemetery Presider
- Tim Abell as Head Surgeon

== Reception ==
The film has a 0% approval rating on Rotten Tomatoes based on 5 reviews, with an average score of 4/10. Critics considered the film to be slow-paced and unimaginative. Zea's performance and the atmosphere of the film were praised by Mike Hale of The New York Times, who criticized the film's thin plot and underwhelming twists. Steve Barton of Dread Central said it was "like realizing that menacing shadow on your wall is being cast by nothing more than an ill placed stuffed animal. It has no real claws, no real fangs, and ultimately no real bite."
