= Riding the Rap =

1995 novel by Elmore Leonard

- First edition
- Author: Elmore Leonard
- Language: English
- Genre: Crime/Contemporary
- Publisher: Delacorte Press
- Publication date: 1995
- Publication place: United States
- Pages: 294 (326 paperback)
- ISBN: 0385324170
- Preceded by: Pronto

Riding the Rap is a 1995 crime fiction novel by Elmore Leonard. It is the sequel to Leonard's Pronto, released in 1993.

== Plot ==
Like Pronto, Riding the Rap centers around Harry Arno, World War II veteran and bookie, now 67 years old. The book also features a reappearance of Harry's ex-girlfriend, and former stripper, Joyce Patton along with her new boyfriend U.S.Marshal Raylan Givens, an always-gets-his-man, Old West type law enforcer. Givens later comes to Harry's aid when he discovers the plot set up by Chip Ganz, Bobby Deo and Louis Lewis. Ganz, who is $16,500 in debt, hatches a plan to steal the millions that Harry has skimmed from the mafia over the years from a Swiss bank account by taking him hostage and forcing the money out of him. It's up to Raylan Givens to find Harry Arno before it's too late.

== Adaptation ==
This story formed the basis of the third episode of the first season of the FX television show Justified, called "Fixer".
