= Peter Levy (cinematographer) =

Australian cinematographer

- Born: Sydney, New South Wales, Australia
- Occupation: Cinematographer
- Years active: 1978–2023
- Organization(s): Australian Cinematographers Society; American Society of Cinematographers

Peter Levy is an Australian cinematographer known for his collaboration with director Stephen Hopkins on blockbuster action and thriller films.

He has been a member of the Australian Cinematographers Society since 1983 and of the American Society of Cinematographers since 2000.

== Filmography ==
=== Film ===
Year	Title	Director
1983	With Prejudice	Esben Storm
1986	Short Changed	George Ogilvie
1987	The Edge of Power	Henri Safran
1988	Dangerous Game	Stephen Hopkins
1989	A Nightmare on Elm Street 5: The Dream Child	Stephen Hopkins
1990	Predator 2	Stephen Hopkins
1991	Ricochet	Russell Mulcahy
1993	Judgment Night	Stephen Hopkins
1994	Blown Away	Stephen Hopkins
1995	Cutthroat Island	Renny Harlin
1996	Broken Arrow	John Woo
1996	The War at Home	Emilio Estevez
1998	Lost in Space	Stephen Hopkins
2000	Under Suspicion	Stephen Hopkins
2004	Torque	Joseph Kahn
2006	Lonely Hearts	Todd Robinson
2007	The Reaping	Stephen Hopkins
2016	Race	Stephen Hopkins

=== Television ===
TV movies

Year	Title	Director
1982	Ponape: Island of Mystery	Nick Frazer
1983	The Cattle King	Bill Bennett
1984	Shipwrecked	Bill Bennett
1985	Robbery	Michael Thornhill
2004	The Life and Death of Peter Sellers	Stephen Hopkins
2009	Maggie Hill	Stephen Hopkins
2010	The Rockford Files	Michael W. Watkins
2012	Beautiful People	Stephen Hopkins
2020	The Dark Tower	Stephen Hopkins

Miniseries

Year	Title	Director
1985	A Fortunate Life	Marcus Cole; Henri Safran
1988	Joe Wilson	Geoffrey Nottage
2020	The Fugitive	Stephen Hopkins

TV series

Year	Title	Director	Notes
2001	Dead Last	Randall Miller	Episode "Pilot"
2001-02	24	Stephen Hopkins; Jon Cassar	3 episodes (Including the pilot)
2002	Without a Trace	David Nutter	Episode "Pilot"
2004	Clubhouse	Gavin O'Connor	Episode "Pilot"
2007	Californication	Stephen Hopkins	Episode "Pilot"
2008	The Oaks	Michael Cuesta	Untold pilot
2009	The Unusuals	Stephen Hopkins	Episode "Pilot"
2010	Justified	Michael Dinner; Jon Avnet	Episodes "Riverbrook" and "The Lord of War and Thunder"
2012-15	House of Lies		48 episodes
2014	Reckless	Catherine Hardwicke	Episode "Pilot"
2016	24: Legacy	Stephen Hopkins	Episode "12:00 Noon – 1:00 PM"
2016-17	MacGyver		8 episodes
2020	Homeland	Keith Gordon	Episode "False Friends"
2023	Liaison	Stephen Hopkins	All 6 episodes

== Awards and nominations ==
Australian Cinematographers Society

Year	Category	Title	Result
1991	Cinematographer of the Year	Predator 2	Won

American Society of Cinematographers

Year	Category	Title	Episode	Result
2002	Outstanding Cinematography in Motion Picture, Limited Series, or Pilot	24	"12:00 a.m. – 1:00 a.m."	Nominated
2005	Outstanding Cinematography in Motion Picture, Limited Series, or Pilot	The Life and Death of Peter Sellers		Nominated
2012	Outstanding Cinematography in Regular Series	House of Lies	"Gods of Dangerous Financial Instruments"	Nominated
2012	Outstanding Cinematography in Regular Series	House of Lies	"The Runner Stumbles"	Nominated
2022	Television Career Achievement Award			Won

Primetime Emmy Awards

Year	Category	Title	Episode	Result	Ref.
2005	Outstanding Cinematography for a Miniseries or Movie	The Life and Death of Peter Sellers		Won	
2008	Outstanding Cinematography for a Half-Hour Series	Californication	"Pilot"	Won	
