= Fixer (Justified) =

- Justified episode
- Episode no.: Season 1 Episode 3
- Directed by: Fred Keller
- Written by: Benjamin Cavell
- Cinematography by: Francis Kenny & Edward J. Pei
- Editing by: Victor Du Bois
- Original air date: March 30, 2010
- Running time: 38 minutes

Guest appearances
- David Eigenberg as Arnold Pinter; Greg Cromer as Travis Travers; Page Kennedy as Curtis Mims; Erin Cardillo as Samantha

Episode chronology
← Previous "Riverbrook"	Next → "Long in the Tooth"
- Justified (season 1)

"Fixer" is the third episode of the first season of the American Neo-Western television series Justified. It is the 3rd overall episode of the series and was written by Benjamin Cavell and directed by Fred Keller. It originally aired on FX on March 30, 2010.

The series is based on Elmore Leonard's stories about the character Raylan Givens, particularly "Fire in the Hole", which serves as the basis for the episode. The series follows Raylan Givens, a tough deputy U.S. Marshal enforcing his own brand of justice. Following the shooting of a mob hitman, Raylan is sent to Lexington, Kentucky to investigate an old childhood friend Boyd Crowder, who is now part of a white supremacist gang. In the episode, Raylan meets an informant serving as a fixer that helps the authorities with information on some criminals. However, the fixer becomes the victim of a scam in an attempt to steal his money.

According to Nielsen Media Research, the episode was seen by an estimated 2.31 million household viewers and gained a 0.9/3 ratings share among adults aged 18–49. The episode received positive reviews from critics, while many critics still expressed concern about its slow pace, other highlighted the episode's character development as strong points.

== Plot ==
Raylan (Timothy Olyphant) is told by Mullen (Nick Searcy) that his father Arlo has been arrested in Harlan County for driving under the influence, of which Raylan is initially dismissive. Under the office's instructions, Raylan meets with local informant Arnold Pinter (David Eigenberg), who also works as a fixer for journalists. Pinter gives Raylan information to raid and arrest a local criminal.

Curtis Mims (Page Kennedy), Pinter's collector, is sent by Pinter to collect a $18,000 debt from Travis Travers (Greg Cromer). Curtis threatens Travers to pay within two days, but Travis convinces him that they can work together for a higher price. When Raylan visits the bar which Pinter frequents to give him his reward, he finds Pinter absent and learns has been missing for hours. Raylan then visits his home, where he runs into Travis, who talks his way out of trouble. Travis returns to his parents' house, where it is revealed that he and Curtis have kidnapped Pinter along with his friend and waitress, Samantha (Erin Cardillo).

Despite their attempts to remain anonymous, Pinter easily deduces that Curtis and Travis are the kidnappers and reveals that he knows that Samantha is working with them to make him talk. To complicate things, Raylan has arrived at the house to question Travis. Curtis learns that there was a $10,000 reward for Pinter but tells Travis and Samantha that it is $5,000 in order to have more for himself. Later, Travis kills Curtis in a gunfight, intending to have a bigger share of the reward. This event causes Samantha to decide to release Pinter.

Raylan arrives at the house with the "reward", and Travis tries to kill him with a hidden gun. A shootout ensures, during which Pinter accidentally shoots Raylan in the chest, although Raylan survives thanks to his bulletproof vest. Noticing that Travis hides behind a door, Raylan shoots through it, killing him. In the aftermath, Pinter is given his reward and Raylan receives a week's paid leave, which Mullen jokes will be more peaceful for him. To Raylan's surprise, Pinter decides not to incriminate Samantha in the events. That night, Raylan visits Ava (Joelle Carter) at her house and after a talk, they share a kiss.

== Reception ==
=== Viewers ===
In its original American broadcast, "Fixer" was seen by an estimated 2.31 million household viewers and gained a 0.9/3 ratings share among adults aged 18–49, according to Nielsen Media Research. This means that 0.9 percent of all households with televisions watched the episode, while 3 percent of all households watching television at that time watched it. This was a 35% decrease in viewership from the previous episode, which was watched by 3.53 million viewers with a 1.4/4 in the 18-49 demographics.

=== Critical reviews ===
"Fixer" received positive reviews from critics. Seth Amitin of IGN gave the episode a "great" 8.4 out of 10 rating and wrote, "Television characters from the whole southern/Appalachian area are typically either used for a fish out of water story or non-existent. I can think of little on TV that took place in the area and gave the characters a fair treatment, though maybe someone else can correct me in the comments section. But Justified goes out of its way to provide substantial characters in a region that isn't shown much. And its content casts a wide net for viewers."

Alan Sepinwall of The Star-Ledger wrote, "FX actually sent 'Fixer' out for review a few weeks after I'd watched the 1st, 2nd and 4th episodes, and there's always the worry that the odd episode out was held back because it wasn't very good. But I'm told the issues here were just post-production-related, and I found "Fixer" to be quite a bit stronger than last week's."

Scott Tobias of The A.V. Club gave the episode a "B+" grade and wrote, "For the second straight episode, Raylan Givens goes about his deputy marshal business in Justified, but as crime-of-the-week episodes go, I found 'Fixer' to be slightly stronger than the last one, because it said something about Raylan, even if it didn't move his story too far forward." Luke Dwyer of TV Fanatic gave the episode a 3 star rating out of 5 and wrote, "The bottom line is that Justified has a solid based to build on: a solid main character, supporting characters that are coming along, a building long term story line and some decent likely one-off performances by villains. What's missing is the individual story each week."
