= Fred Golan =

American television writer and producer

- Born: Columbus, Ohio, United States
- Occupations: Television writer, producer
- Years active: 1992–present

Fred Golan is an American television writer and producer. Golan is best known for his work on series such as Silo, Justified, and Sneaky Pete, on all of which he served as a writer and executive producer. Notable other work includes Boomtown, Roswell, and The Big Easy.

In 2013, Fred Golan was nominated by the Mystery Writers of America, for an "Edgar Allan Poe Award" for writing Justified, Season 3 episode "Slaughterhouse."

== Notable television work ==
=== The Big Easy ===
- That Voodoo That You Do (1.11)
- Long and Short (1.15) (with Anne Kenney)
- Vamps Like Us (1.20)
- Heavenly Body (2.2)
- A Perfect Day for Buffalo Fish (2.7)

=== Roswell ===
- Harvest (2.6)

=== Boomtown ===
- Crash (1.8)
- Blackout (1.17)
- Wannabe (2.3)

=== Justified ===
- The Hammer (1.10) (with Chris Provenzano)
- Bulletville (1.13)
- Bloody Harlan (2.13)
- The Gunfighter (3.1)
- Slaughterhouse (3.13)
