= Chris Provenzano =

American film and television writer

Chris Provenzano is an American film and television writer. He co-wrote the story and screenplay for the motion picture Get Low. He was a writer on the first season of Mad Men in 2007, writing the episode "The Hobo Code" and co-writing the episode "Shoot". Alongside his colleagues on the writing staff he won a Writers' Guild award for best new series. He was nominated for the award for best dramatic series and best episodic drama for "The Hobo Code". With colleagues, he was nominated for a Writers' Guild award for Silicon Valley.

He was an executive story editor on the first season of Justified in 2010, writing "Long in the Tooth" and co-writing "The Hammer."
