= Graham Yost =

Canadian film and television screenwriter

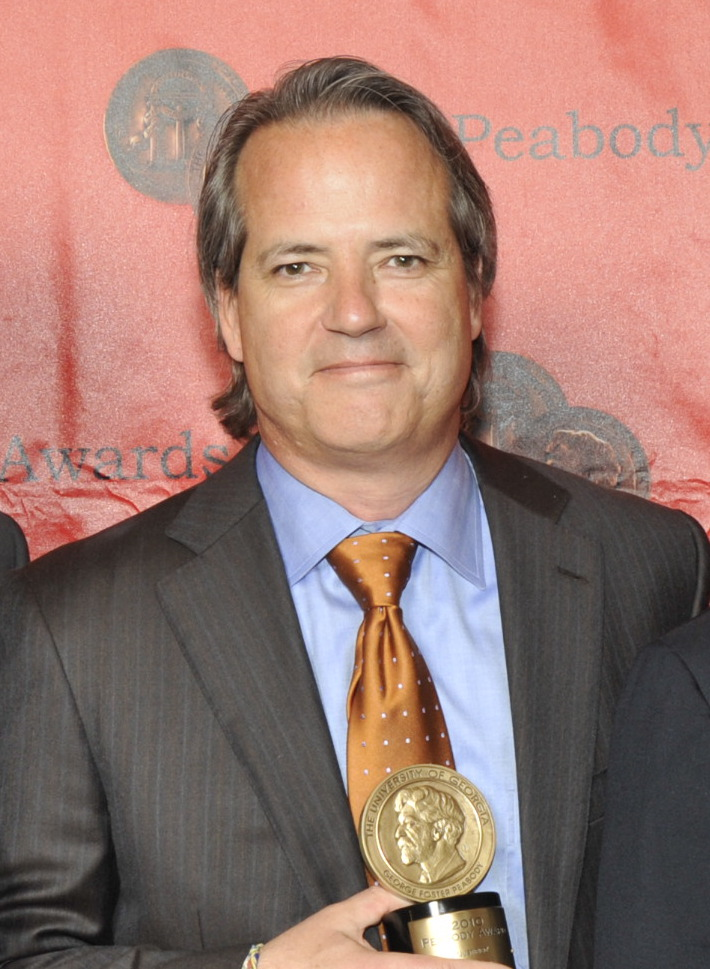
- Yost with his Peabody Award in 2011
- Born: September 5, 1959 (age 67); Etobicoke, Ontario, Canada
- Education: Trinity College, Toronto
- Occupations: Screenwriter, television producer, television director, actor.
- Years active: 1989–present

Graham John Yost (born September 5, 1959) is a Canadian film and television screenwriter. His best-known works are the films Speed, Broken Arrow, and Hard Rain and the TV series Justified and Silo.

== Early life, family and education ==
Yost was born in Etobicoke in the Toronto metropolitan area. He is the son of Canadian television personality Elwy Yost, the longtime host of the public broadcaster TVOntario's Saturday Night at the Movies.

He graduated from the University of Toronto Schools and Trinity College at the University of Toronto.

== Career ==
Yost wrote for the TV sitcom Herman's Head and the HBO miniseries Band of Brothers. In 2002, he created the television drama series Boomtown. He created the short-lived NBC drama Raines (2007). Yost teamed with Tom Hanks and Steven Spielberg, along with two of his fellow Boomtown writers Michelle Ashford and Larry Andries, to write and direct episodes of the HBO miniseries The Pacific.

Yost is the creator and executive producer of the FX series Justified which premiered in 2010. He was an executive producer on the FX show The Americans which ran from 2013 to 2018. In 2014, Yost was attached to an adaptation of the Alex Kershaw book Avenue of Spies for WGN America. In 2016, he took over as head writer and executive producer of the Amazon Studios series Sneaky Pete.

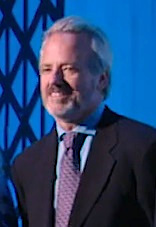
Graham Yost at the Peabody Awards 2019

In May 2021, Apple TV+ announced that Yost would serve as showrunner and executive producer for the science fiction series Silo based on the dystopian book series of the same name by Hugh Howey.

On July 31, 2026, Variety reported that Yost and Aric Avelino were developing the "Harlem Trilogy," based on three novels by Colson Whitehead, for Apple TV.

== Awards and nominations ==
Yost won two Emmy Awards for his involvement in the miniseries From the Earth to the Moon and The Pacific, which was also nominated for a Golden Globe Award. He also won a Golden Globe for his work on the HBO miniseries Band of Brothers, for which he was one of the writers.

== Personal life ==
Graham Yost is married to Connie F. Yost.

== Filmography ==
Film writer

- Speed (1994)
- Broken Arrow (1996)
- Firestorm (1998) (rewrite)
- Hard Rain (1998)
- Mission to Mars (2000)
- Planet of the Apes (2001) (uncredited)
- The Last Castle (2001)
- The Grizzlies (2018)

TV series

Year	Title	Director	Writer	Creator	Producer	Notes
1989–1991	Hey Dude	No	Yes	No	No	13 episodes
1991	Herman's Head	No	Yes	No	No	Episode "The Last Boy Scout"
1992–1993	The Powers That Be	No	Yes	No	No	4 episodes
1998	From the Earth to the Moon	Yes	Yes	No	Supervising	Wrote 2 episodes; Directed episode "Spider"
1998	L.A. Doctors	Yes	No	No	No	Episode "Whither Thou Goest"
2001	Band of Brothers	No	Yes	No	No	2 episodes
2002–2003	Boomtown	Yes	Yes	Yes	Executive	Wrote 6 episodes
2004	Summerland	No	Yes	No	No	Episode "Skipping School"
2007	Raines	No	Yes	Yes	Executive	Wrote episode "Pilot"
2010	The Pacific	Yes	Yes	No	Executive	Wrote and directed episode "Gloucester/Pavuvu/Banika"
2010–2015	Justified	No	Yes	Yes	Executive	Wrote 12 episodes
2011	Falling Skies	No	Yes	No	Executive	Wrote episode "The Armory"
2013–2018	The Americans	No	No	No	Executive	
2015–2018	Sneaky Pete	No	Yes	No	Executive	Wrote 7 episodes
2022–present	Slow Horses	No	No	No	Executive	
2023–present	Silo	No	Yes	Yes	Executive	Wrote 3 episodes
2023	Justified: City Primeval	No	No	No	Executive	
2024	Masters of the Air	No	No	No	Co-Executive	

TV movies

Year	Title	Writer	Executive Producer
2002	Young Arthur	Yes	Yes
2006	Sixty Minute Man	Yes	Yes
2014	Wild Blue	No	Yes
