= Jacob Pitts =

American television, film, and stage actor (born 1979)

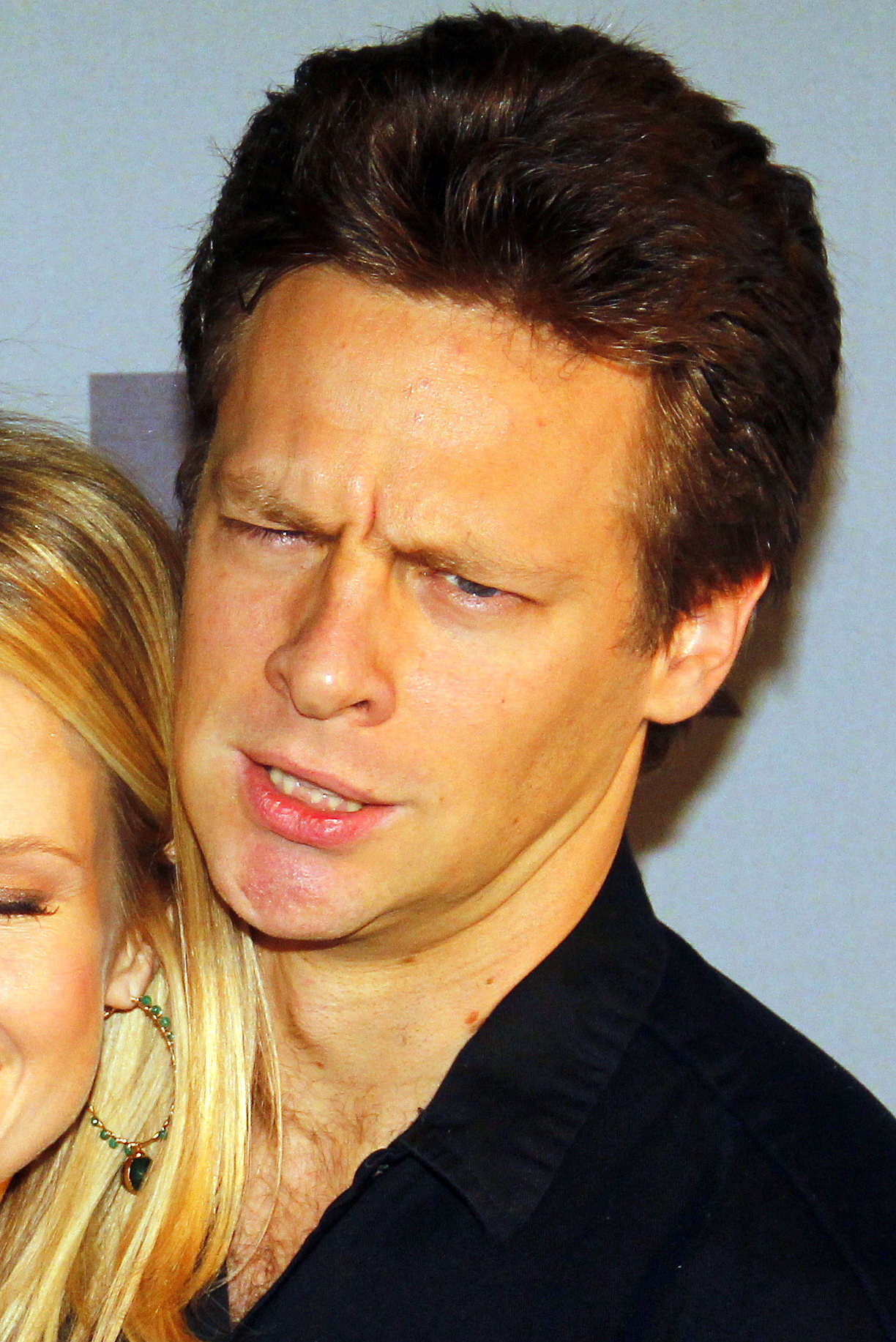
- Pitts in 2012
- Born: Jacob Rives Pitts; November 20, 1979 (age 46); Weston, Connecticut, U.S.
- Occupation: Actor
- Years active: 1999–present
- Spouse: Tereza Nvotová (m. 2020)

Jacob Rives Pitts (born November 20, 1979) is an American television, film, and stage actor. His most notable performances were as Cooper Harris in the film EuroTrip (2004), as Bill "Hoosier" Smith in the HBO miniseries The Pacific (2010), and as Deputy U.S. Marshal Tim Gutterson on the FX television drama Justified (2010–2015). He appeared in the play Where Do We Live at the Vineyard Theatre in May 2004. Pitts has also appeared in TV shows such as Law & Order, Ed, and Sex and the City. He had a recurring role in the first season of The Sinner and starred as Lance Lord in the crime drama series Sneaky Pete.

== Early life and education ==
Jacob Rives Pitts was born on November 20, 1979, and grew up in Weston, Connecticut, the son of Arlene and Joseph Rives Pitts. He described himself as a hyperactive child. In high school, he was involved in the theater production company, and took part in productions while he was in school, including a performance as the Mysterious Man in Into The Woods.

== Career ==
Pitts made his debut in 1999, and he appeared in an episode of Comedy Central's sitcom Strangers with Candy. He then went on to the New York Broadway stage in 2000, when he played Fleance from the Shakespearean play Macbeth.

He began his TV career with appearances in popular series like Sex and the City (1998–2004) and Law & Order (1990–). His breakthrough came as Tim Gutterson in FX’s critically acclaimed series Justified (2010–2015), where he portrayed a skilled marksman and deputy U.S. Marshal, appearing in 78 episodes across six seasons.

In addition to his television success, Pitts delivered a memorable performance as PFC Bill "Hoosier" Smith in HBO's Emmy-winning miniseries The Pacific (2010), which depicted the harrowing experiences of World War II US Marines.

His role in Sneaky Pete (2015–2019) as Lance further solidified his reputation, with 15 episodes showcasing his versatility.

On the big screen, Pitts is best known for his comedic role as Cooper Harris in the cult classic EuroTrip (2004) and his performance as Fisher in the thriller 21 (2008), alongside Kevin Spacey and Jim Sturgess.

Pitts has also made appearances in numerous other acclaimed series, including The Sinner (2017–2021), Sneaky Pete (2015–2019), Homecoming (2018), and The Blacklist (2013–2023). His dedication to portraying complex and engaging characters has earned him respect as a talented actor across genres.

"It’s all about being part of the cultural experience, part of the crowd — or rejecting it. But I don’t want my experience to depend on how it jives with those around me. That’s what makes it MY experience. I want my mystery witch thing. I don’t know. Maybe I should just not worry so much about it." — Jacob Pitts for MUBI.

== Awards and honors ==
In 2008, Pitts was presented the Best Ensemble Award at the ShoWest Convention in the United States for his part in 21. The award was also presented to Jim Sturgess, Kevin Spacey, Kate Bosworth, Laurence Fishburne, Aaron Yoo, Liza Lapira, and Josh Gad for their parts in the movie.

== Filmography ==
Year	Title	Role	Notes
1999	Strangers with Candy	Craig Snow	TV series (Episode: "Dreams on the Rocks")
2000	Law & Order	Jon Telford	TV series (Episode: "Loco Parentis")
2000	Sex and the City	Sam Jones	TV series (Episode: "What Goes Around Comes Around")
2001	Zen and the Art of Landscaping	Andy / Son	Short film
2001	Tart	Toby Logan	
2001	Eight	Todd	Short film
2002	Pipe Dream	Autumn	
2002	We Were the Mulvaneys	Patrick Mulvaney	TV movie
2002	K-19: The Widowmaker	Grigori	
2002	Ed	Johnny Malone	TV series (Episode: "The Road")
2004	EuroTrip	Cooper Harris	
2004	A Separate Peace	Brinker	TV movie
2005	1/4 Life	Andy	TV movie
2006	The Novice	Peter Pekorius	
2006	Capitol Law	Ryan	TV movie
2007	Across the Universe	Rap Magazine Employee	
2008	Quid Pro Quo	Hugh	
2008	21	Fisher	
2010	The Pacific	PFC Bill 'Hoosier' Smith	TV mini-series (5 episodes)
2010	The Good Wife	Vance Salle	TV series (Episode: "Taking Control")
2010 – 2015	Justified	Tim Gutterson	TV series (53 episodes)
2012, 2016	Person of Interest	Henry Peck	TV series (2 episodes)
2012	True Dead	Walter	Short film
2013	Above Average Presents		TV series (Episode: "Clap It Up (Step Up Parody)")
2013	That Thing with the Cat	Jackson	
2014	Elementary	Paul Ladesma	TV series (Episode: "Just a Regular Irregular")
2015	Pitiful Creatures	Doctor	TV series (Episode: "Selfish Dying Man ")
2015	Comedy Bang! Bang!	Reporter	TV series (Episode: "Judd Apatow Wears a Polo and Blue Suede Shoes")
2015	Try Hard: The Rex Derby Story	Johnny Cowan	Short film
2016	Limitless	Adam Bruster	TV series (2 episodes)
2016	BrainDead	Don Pickle	TV series (Episode: "Taking on Water: How Leaks in D.C. Are Discovered and Patched")
2017 – 2019	Sneaky Pete	Lance Lord	TV series (15 episodes)
2017	The Sinner	J.D.	TV series (6 episodes)
2018	Homecoming	AJ	TV series (2 episodes)
2018	Law & Order: Special Victims Unit	ADA Hodges	TV series (Episode: "Hell's Kitchen")
2020	Bull	Roland Terrell	TV series (Episode: "Prison Break)
2023	The Blacklist	Quentin Dodd	TV series (Episode: "The Four Guns")
2025	The Rookie	Joel Howser	TV series (Episode: "Speed")

== Personal life ==
Pitts married Slovak director, screenwriter and actress Tereza Nvotová in 2020. They live between Prague and New York.
