= Natalie Zea =

American actress (born 1975)

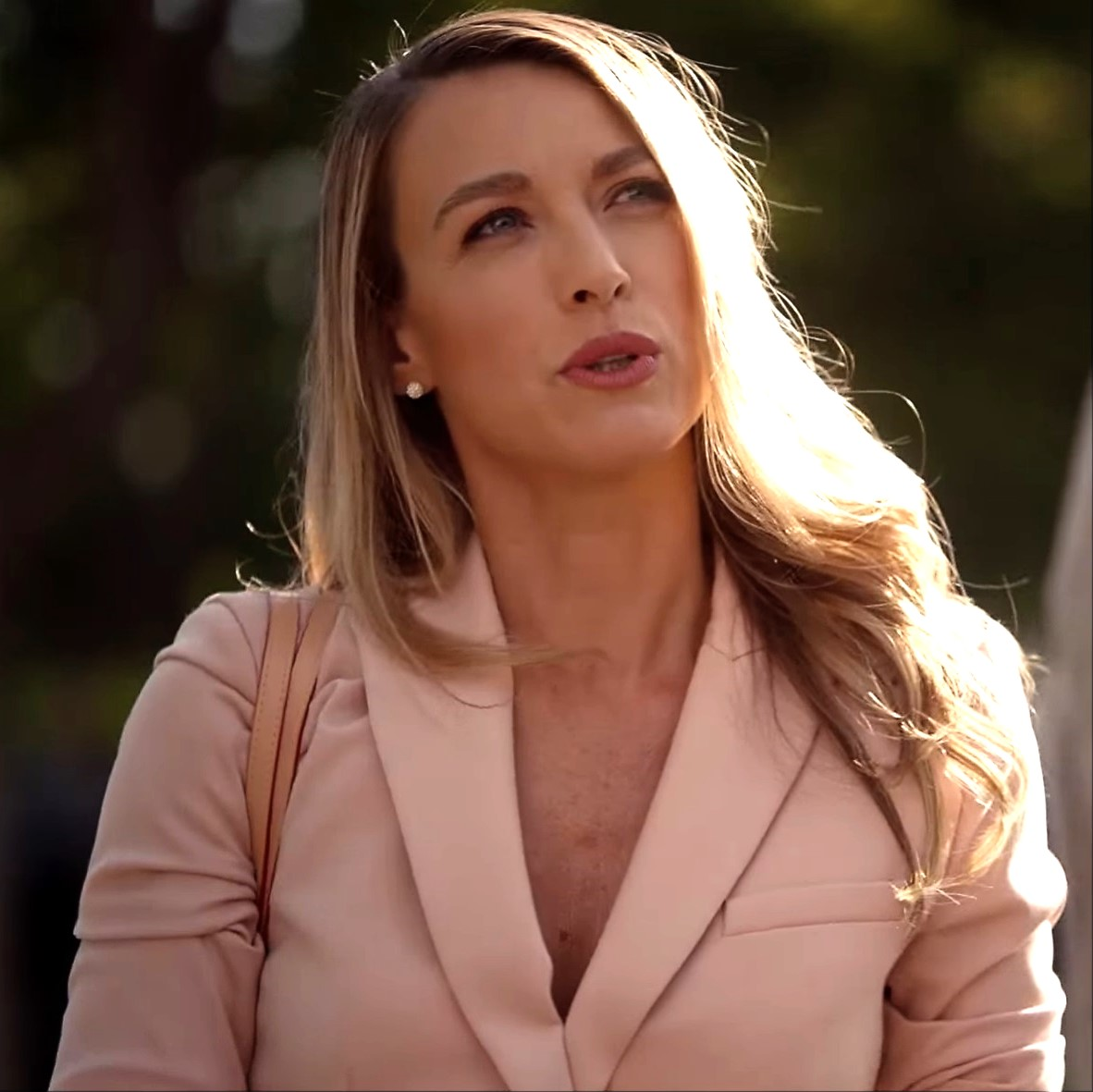
- Zea on White Famous in 2017
- Born: March 17, 1975 (age 51); Houston, Texas, U.S.
- Occupation: Actress
- Years active: 1993–present
- Spouse: Travis Schuldt (m. 2014)
- Children: 1

Natalie Zea (born March 17, 1975) is an American actress known for her performances on television. Zea began her acting career in theatre. Her first major role was on the NBC daytime soap opera Passions (2000–2002), where she played the role of Gwen Hotchkiss. Her breakout role was on the ABC primetime soap opera Dirty Sexy Money as socialite Karen Darling, where she starred from 2007 to 2009. Zea also has made many guest appearances on television, starred in a number of independent and made-for-television movies, and had recurring roles in The Shield, Hung, Californication, and The Unicorn.

In 2010, Zea began starring as Winona Hawkins in the FX critically acclaimed crime drama series Justified as a regular cast member during the first three seasons and recurring guest star later. In 2013, she also began starring as Claire Matthews in the Fox drama series The Following. Zea played lead character Mickey Holmes-Harris on the canceled-before-airing ABC dramedy series, Members Only, and starred in the 2016–2019 TBS sitcom The Detour. In 2020, Zea had a recurring role as Shannon in the CBS sitcom The Unicorn.

== Early life ==
Zea was born in Houston, Texas, attending high school in Monahans, graduating in 1993. She graduated from the American Musical and Dramatic Academy in New York City in 1995. Also in 1995, Zea co-starred as Lana Tisdel in the short film Boys Don't Cry. In the 1999 feature film version of Boys Don't Cry, the role was played by Chloë Sevigny. She also appeared in many national commercials for companies such as Dove, Snickers, and Hellman's Salad Dressing.

== Career ==
=== 1995–2009 ===
Zea began her career in an Off-Broadway theatre, appearing in productions of The Three Sisters and A Midsummer Night's Dream. She made her feature debut in the Shakespeare-themed independent drama Macbeth in Manhattan in 1999. In the following year, Zea made her television debut in an episode of short-lived The WB drama series, D.C.. Later in that year she was cast as Gwen Hotchkiss Winthrop, a businesswoman and socialite, in the NBC daytime soap opera Passions. She appeared in the show on a regular basis from November 15, 2000, to October 3, 2002. On her leaving, Zea said "I have decided not to renew my contract with Passions. Although I enjoyed my experience, and learned quite a bit, especially initially, I know that the best thing for my career, and my craft, is to pursue new challenges. So after some deliberation, an amicable parting of ways seemed to be the best decision".

In 2004, Zea was cast in a recurring role in the FX police drama series The Shield. She played the role of Lauren Riley, a love interest of Michael Chiklis' character Vic Mackey. The following year, Zea won her first series regular role on primetime television, on the ABC drama series, Eyes opposite Tim Daly. The series was canceled after a single season. Her next major role was on the ABC primetime soap opera/comedy-drama Dirty Sexy Money opposite Jill Clayburgh, Donald Sutherland and Peter Krause. Zea played spoiled socialite Karen Darling. The soap aired from 2007 to 2009, and was canceled after two seasons. In 2009, she had a recurring role during the first season of the HBO comedy series Hung. She also had many guest-starring roles, on CSI: Crime Scene Investigation, Two and a Half Men, Without a Trace, Medium, Franklin & Bash, and Person of Interest.

=== 2010–present ===
In 2010, Zea began starring as series regular during the first three seasons of the FX drama Justified, changing to a recurring role from Season 4. She played the role of Winona Hawkins, the ex-wife of Raylan Givens. Zea was originally a guest star in the pilot for Justified, but was made a regular right after the pilot with a two-year deal. Alongside her regular role on Justified, from 2012 to 2013, Zea had the recurring role on Showtime comedy-drama, Californication as a new love interest for David Duchovny' character. In film, Zea had supporting role in the 2010 comedy The Other Guys. As lead actress, she co-starred alongside Sean Patrick Flanery in the 2011 independent thriller InSight, and in the Lifetime movie Burden of Evil (2012).

In 2013, Zea starred in the major role of Dr. Claire Matthews, the estranged wife of a serial killer in the Fox drama series, The Following. She returned to show in second season on a recurring basis. Also in 2013, she had a recurring role as Maxine Seagrave, a drug and gambling kingpin, on the first season of CBS summer series, Under the Dome. Later in that year, Zea was cast in her first series leading role of the Amazon comedy pilot The Rebels. The pilot premiered in February 2014, but was not picked up to series. Later in that year, Zea was cast in two independent films: Too Late in the female lead role opposite John Hawkes, and The Grey Lady as lead character.

On August 4, 2014, it was announced that Zea was cast as lead character in the straight-to-series ordered ABC primetime soap opera, Members Only. She plays the role of Mickey Holmes-Harris the "most well-educated and put-together member of the family that founded the country club around which the show is centered." Members Only was cancelled by ABC before premiere. On December 2, 2014, Zea was cast as lead opposite Jason Jones in the TBS vacation comedy The Detour.

On February 26, 2020, Zea began in the lead role of Eve Harris in the NBC apocalyptic drama series La Brea, written by David Appelbaum.

In 2020, Zea had recurring roles in 9-1-1: Lone Star and The Unicorn.

== Personal life ==
In June 2013, Zea announced her engagement to her former Passions co-star Travis Schuldt after 10 years of dating. The couple married on July 16, 2014, in Hawaii. In June 2015, they announced they were expecting their first child together. In October 2015, Zea gave birth to a daughter named Reygan.

== Filmography ==
=== Film ===
Year	Title	Role	Notes
1995	Boys Don't Cry	Lana Tisdel	Short
1999	Macbeth in Manhattan	Samantha/First Witch	
1999	Lucid Days in Hell	Naomi	
2008	From a Place of Darkness	Brenda	
2010	The Other Guys	Christinith	
2011	InSight	Kaitlyn	
2011	The Sexy Dark Ages	Gwendolyn	Short
2011	Method	Actress	Short
2012	Burden of Evil	Caitlyn Conner	TV movie
2013	Sweet Talk	Delilah	
2015	Grey Lady	Melissa Reynolds	
2015	Too Late	Mary Mahler	
2019	Lady Hater	Premstar	Short
2020	The F**k-It List	Kristen	
2021	Happily	Karen	

=== Television ===
Year	Title	Role	Notes
2000	D.C.	-	Episode: "Blame"
2001	CSI: Crime Scene Investigation	Needra Fenway	Episode: "Gentle, Gentle"
2002	MDs	Ghost	Episode: "R.I.P."
2000–02	Passions	Gwen Hotchkiss Winthrop	Regular Cast
2004	The Shield	Lauren Riley	Recurring Cast: Season 3
2005	Two and a Half Men	Colleen	Episode: "We Called It Mr. Pinky"
2005	Eyes	Trish Agermeyer	Main Cast
2006	Freddie	Sally	Episode: "Freddie and the Hot Mom"
2006	Without a Trace	Jennifer Nichols	Episode: "Crossroads"
2006	Just Legal	-	Episode: "The Rainmaker"
2007–09	Dirty Sexy Money	Karen Darling	Main Cast
2009	Hung	Jemma	Recurring Cast: Season 1
2009	Medium	Sophie Cullen	Episode: "Deja Vu All Over Again"
2010	The Defenders	ADA Meredith Kramer	Recurring Cast
2010	Law & Order: Los Angeles	Sarah Goodwin	Episode: "Hondo Field"
2010–15	Justified	Winona Hawkins	Main Cast: Season 1-3, Recurring Cast: Season 4-6
2011	Franklin & Bash	Isabella Kaplowitz	Episode: "She Came Upstairs to Kill Me"
2011	Royal Pains	Judy Windland	Episode: "Traffic"
2011	Person of Interest	Diane Hanson	Episode: "Pilot"
2012–13	Californication	Carrie	Recurring Cast: Season 5, Guest: Season 6
2013	Under the Dome	Maxine Seagrave	Recurring Cast: Season 1
2013–14	The Following	Claire Matthews	Main Cast: Season 1, Recurring Cast: Season 2
2016–19	The Detour	Robin Randall	Main Cast
2017	White Famous	Amy Von Getz	Recurring Cast
2020	9-1-1: Lone Star	Zoe	Episodes: "Studs" & "Awakening"
2020–21	The Unicorn	Shannon	Guest: Season 1, Recurring Cast: Season 2
2021–24	La Brea	Eve Harris	Main Cast: Season 1-2, Guest: Season 3
2023	Justified: City Primeval	Winona Hawkins	Episode: "The Question"
2024–present	Chicago Med	Jackie Nelson, R.N.	Guest: Season 9 Recurring Cast: Season 10–present
2026	Fire Country	Camille Thurston, M.D.	Recurring Cast: Season 4–present
