= Raylan Givens =

Fictional character created by Elmore Leonard

- Justified and Justified: City Primeval character
- First appearance: Novel series: Pronto (1993); Television series: Pronto (1997); "Fire in the Hole" (2010)
- Last appearance: Novel series: Raylan (2012); Television series: "The Question" (2023)
- Created by: Elmore Leonard
- Portrayed by: James LeGros (Pronto); Timothy Olyphant (Justified)

In-universe information
- Full name: Raylan Givens
- Gender: Male
- Title: Marshal Givens
- Occupation: Deputy U.S. Marshal
- Family: Arlo Givens (father); Frances Givens (mother); Helen Givens (aunt/step-mother)
- Spouse: Winona Hawkins (ex-wife)
- Children: Willa Givens (with Winona)

Raylan Givens is a fictional character created by American novelist and screenwriter Elmore Leonard.

Givens is a Deputy U.S. Marshal and initially appeared in the novels Pronto and Riding the Rap. (Pronto was adapted as a TV movie in 1997 with James LeGros as Givens.) Leonard later penned the short story "Fire in the Hole", which became the basis for the television series Justified starring Timothy Olyphant. In April 2011, Leonard revealed in an interview that the success of Justified had inspired him to begin work on a new novel about the character. The novel, titled Raylan, came out in 2012, and was Leonard's last work to be published before his death.

== Creation ==
Author Elmore Leonard stated that names were important in the creation of his characters. For Raylan Givens, it was an introduction at a lunch during a book distributor convention which provided the character's name.

It was at a book distributor convention sponsored by Western Merchandisers in Amarillo, Texas, on a Saturday in June 1991. I was the guest speaker at a sales conference luncheon. I remember standing between a Ninja Turtle and a Miss Texas from a few years back. Don't ask me why. But what I remember most is the young man sitting next to me on the dais during lunch.

He introduced himself. 'Hello, Mr. Leonard. My name's Raylan Davis.'

I didn't even hear the last name, I just heard 'Raylan' and knew I wanted to use it. I asked him, 'How would you like to be the star of my next book?'

== Overview ==
In the novel Pronto, Givens is described as about forty years old, thin and rangy, and perpetually wearing a cowboy hat. He is a native of Harlan County, Kentucky. Raylan likes ice cream as mentioned on Justified. He has an intuition about people and their criminal intentions which usually leads to him shooting them despite his best efforts to resolve things peacefully. While Raylan mostly attempts to act righteously, he has cornered certain adversaries with every intention to kill them. This is the very thing that lands Raylan back in Harlan at the start of season one of Justified. In the novels, his hat is described as a flat-brimmed hat akin to the kind worn by the police officers in the photo of Lee Harvey Oswald's murder. According to the novel Pronto, before he became a Deputy Marshal, Givens served in the Marines. After being given the slip by a federal grand jury witness, Harry Arno, at Atlanta Airport, Givens was appointed as a Firearms instructor at the U.S. Marshals Service Basic Training Academy in Glynco, Georgia. Givens, who was an expert marksman with a handgun and an expert at the fast draw with any pistol as well as an expert with other weaponry, perceived this appointment as a demotion or reprimand for losing his witness.

== Adaptations ==
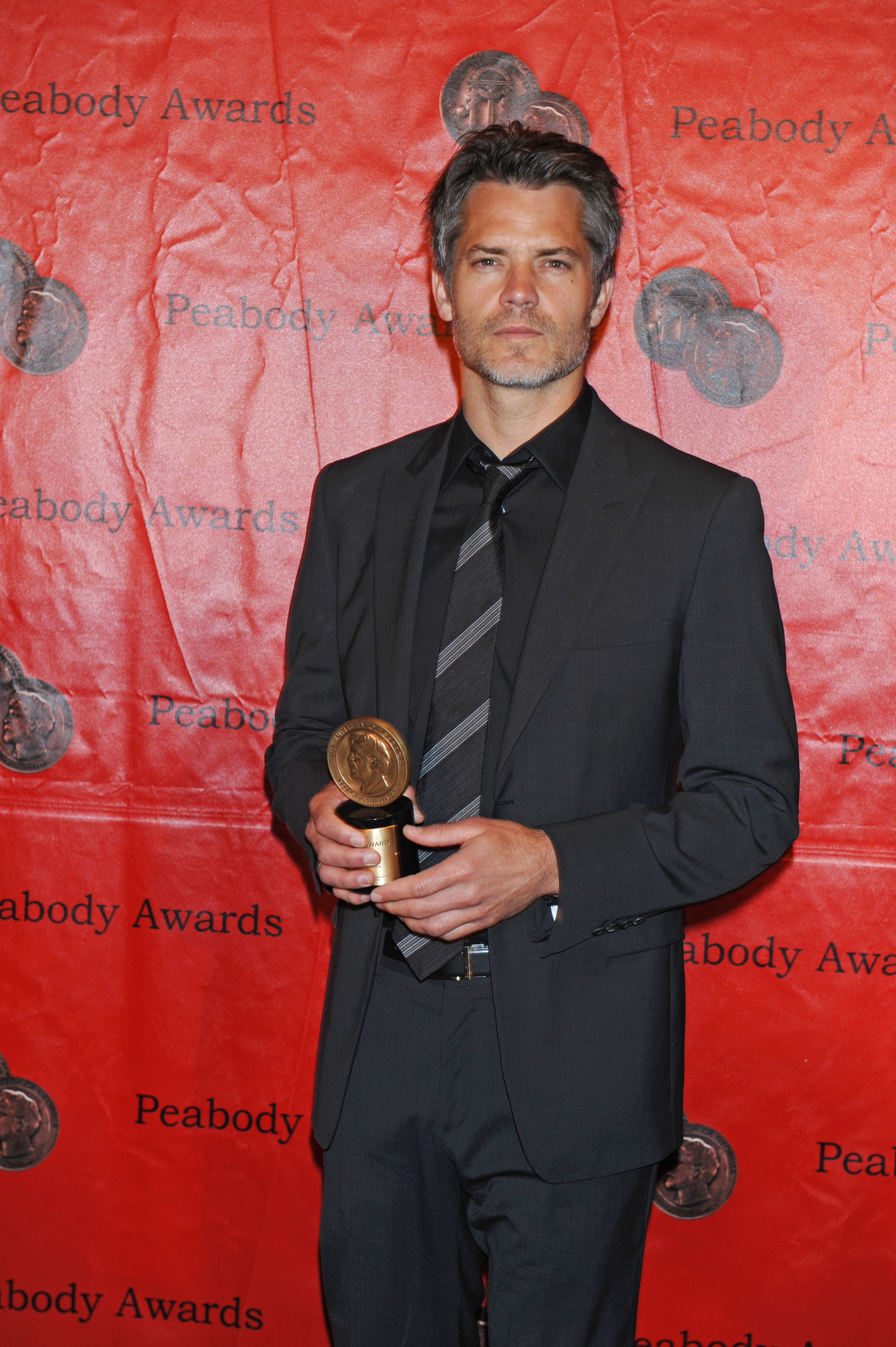
Timothy Olyphant at the 70th Annual Peabody Awards with award for Justified

Raylan Givens was first portrayed by actor James LeGros in a 1997 television adaptation of Pronto. In early 2010, the FX Network premiered the television show Justified starring Timothy Olyphant in the role of Givens.

On the official Elmore Leonard website, some trepidation was expressed about the television show getting the correct hat for the character.

There appears to be movement toward getting a Raylan Givens TV series on cable. I'm all for it but they better get Raylan's hat right this time. In the TV movie, Pronto, they gave poor James LeGros a George Strait hat that looked like it was ready to take off. The real Raylan hat is what Elmore calls, 'The Dallas Businessman's Special'—a felt city cowboy hat called the Stetson 'Open Road'—Accept no substitute.

While the show Justified does not get the hat exactly correct, Leonard considers the show's portrayal of Givens to be perfect.

My favorite character is Raylan. Timothy Olyphant's perfect because there are not many actors who have delivered the lines the way I heard them when I was writing them. George Clooney was close, and Tarantino was faithful. Richard Boone was in two movies of mine, and every word he said was the way I heard it when I wrote it. I think it's great.

Givens is native to the rural eastern Kentucky mining area of Harlan County but is assigned to Miami Beach, Florida in the novels Pronto and Riding the Rap. For the short story "Fire in the Hole", Leonard has Givens returning to his roots and being assigned to Kentucky as a punishment for his actions in the previous novels.

== List of literary appearances ==
- By Elmore Leonard
  - Pronto (1993, novel)
  - Riding the Rap (1995, novel)
  - "Fire in the Hole" (2001, short story)
  - Raylan (2012, novel)
- By Peter Leonard
  - Raylan Goes to Detroit (2018, novel)
