= A Man Walks Into a Bar =

A Man Walks Into a Bar or A Guy Walks Into a Bar may refer to:

- Bar joke, a joke template commonly beginning with "A man walks into a bar ..."
- "A Man Walks Into a Bar..." (NCIS), 2011 television episode
- "Guy Walks Into a Bar" (Justified), 2012 television episode
- "A Guy Walks Into a Bar" (song), 2014 by Tyler Farr
- Guy Walks into a Bar... (album), 2019 by Mini Mansions

== See also ==
- Girl Walks into a Bar, 2011 film
