= Loose Ends (Justified) =

- Justified episode
- Episode no.: Season 3 Episode 9
- Directed by: Gwyneth Horder-Payton
- Written by: Ingrid Escajeda
- Cinematography by: Francis Kenny
- Editing by: Steve Polivka
- Original air date: March 13, 2012
- Running time: 41 minutes

Guest appearances
- Mykelti Williamson as Ellstin Limehouse; David Andrews as Sheriff Tillman Napier; Jim Beaver as Shelby Parlow; Jim Haynie as Lamuel Briggs; William Mapother as Delroy Baker; David Meunier as Johnny Crowder; Conor O'Farrell as Agent Keaton; Willow Geer as J.J. Corliss; Demetrius Grosse as Errol; Brendan McCarthy as Tanner Dodd; Cleavon R. McClendon III as Bernard; Abby Miller as Ellen May; Peter Murnik as Trooper Tom Bergen; Neal McDonough as Robert Quarles

Episode chronology
| ← Previous "Watching the Detectives" | Next → "Guy Walks into a Bar" |
- Justified (season 3)

"Loose Ends" is the ninth episode of the third season of the American Neo-Western television series Justified. It is the 35th overall episode of the series and was written by story editor Ingrid Escajeda and directed by Gwyneth Horder-Payton. It originally aired on FX on March 13, 2012.

The series is based on Elmore Leonard's stories about the character Raylan Givens, particularly "Fire in the Hole", which serves as the basis for the episode. The series follows Raylan Givens, a tough deputy U.S. Marshal enforcing his own brand of justice. The series revolves around the inhabitants and culture in the Appalachian Mountains area of eastern Kentucky, specifically Harlan County where many of the main characters grew up. In the episode, Raylan focuses on Quarles, who is having logistical problems with Sheriff Napier's campaign.

According to Nielsen Media Research, the episode was seen by an estimated 2.26 million household viewers and gained a 0.9 ratings share among adults aged 18–49. The episode received generally positive reviews from critics, who praised Joelle Carter's performance and Ava's character development.

== Plot ==
Mullen (Nick Searcy) confronts Raylan (Timothy Olyphant) about his secret investigation of a man named Brady Hughes and tells him he doesn't want him to continue investigating Quarles (Neal McDonough). Meanwhile, Delroy (William Mapother) forces three of his employees to rob an outlet but the robbery goes awry when one of them is shot and subsequently dies. They dump her body in the woods and Delroy kills another of the employees. The third one, Ellen May (Abby Miller), manages to escape.

After a talk with Ava (Joelle Carter), Raylan visits Boyd (Walton Goggins) in jail. Boyd states that Tanner Dodd (Brendan McCarthy) is responsible for the car bombing and Raylan deduces Tanner was the one who got out of the Oxy mobile clinic. Raylan remains curious about Devil's whereabouts, unaware that Boyd killed him. Raylan talks to Tanner's mother, who claims she hasn't contacted him in years. However, the mother informs Tanner about Raylan's suspicions. Raylan also uses this to talk to Sheriff Napier (David Andrews), who acts nervous when Raylan claims to have found evidence of Tanner's involvement in the car bombing.

Ellen May asks Ava for help, who gives her shelter in the bar. But Johnny (David Meunier) tells her that Delroy pays them for protection and forces her to call Delroy to notify her about Ellen May, although Ava charges $2,000 to get her back. Tanner and Errol (Demetrius Grosse) rob Lamuel Briggs (Jim Haynie) for a refund of the car's bomb but Briggs tricks Tanner to step on a stool designed as an explosive mine. Briggs tells Tanner that he will help him to get out of the mine if they drop their guns. However, Errol kills Briggs, to Tanner's shock. He reluctantly gives the bag with money to Errol, who claims he will be back after giving it to his mother.

Eventually, Tanner decides to call the police to turn himself in and asks them to disarm the bomb. Raylan passes Napier to tell him about Tanner's situation, angering him. Raylan and the police enter the house to disarm Tanner's bomb. During this, Raylan convinces Tanner to talk about everything involving Quarles but before he can say it, he accidentally drops his gun, which causes the bomb to be set. Raylan and the police escape before the bomb explodes, killing Tanner before he can confess anything to Raylan. At an election debate between Napier and Parlow (Jim Beaver), Boyd appears, having been released from jail. He uses this to paint Napier in a negative way and calling him off for profiting off the citizens' tragedies, earning more support to Parlow.

Ava then forces Ellen May to surrender herself to Delroy. But when Delroy puts his guard down, Ava kills him with a shotgun and takes the $2,000. She later tells Boyd that she killed him because she is interested in becoming his successor. Watching Tanner's mother's house, Raylan sees Errol deliver the money. Raylan visits Limehouse (Mykelti Williamson) at his Holler, warning him that he is closing in on Quarles, but Limehouse reminds Raylan of nearly killing his father when Raylan was little.

== Production ==
=== Development ===
In February 2012, it was reported that the ninth episode of the third season would be titled "Loose Ends", and was to be directed by Gwyneth Horder-Payton and written by story editor Ingrid Escajeda.

=== Writing ===
Delroy's storyline was adapted from Elmore Leonard's 2012 novel Raylan. Series developer Graham Yost explained, "I think in his book it’s bankrobbing strippers, and the guy who runs the strip joint is this African-American character Delroy, but we decided to make him the pimp daddy at Audrey’s whorehouse. We had that from the beginning of the season. We wanted to do bankrobbing hookers pretty early. And then we switched it off of a bank because we've done a lot of banks on the show, and we knew we were going to a big bank thing in a later episode."

Boyd's speech at the debate was inspired by The 39 Steps, with Yost commenting, "we knew we wanted Boyd to give one of those speeches that is ultimately nonsensical and has absolutely nothing to do with the matters at hand, but due to his bravura delivery of the speech still gets people cheering."

Yost teased that Delroy and Tanner Dodd would play important roles on the episode. Regarding Ava's role in the episode, Yost commented, "one of themes of the season is crossing lines, and this is a big line for her to cross." Star Joelle Carter also commented, "The difference is that Ava's just introduced to this world, Raylan lives it. He's probably constantly thinking of ways to handle situations without killing people because he's in law enforcement. I like to think that they think that way, our law enforcement people. How can I get out of this situation without killing or maiming anyone?"

Lemuel Briggs was introduced back on "Veterans". On Tanner's death, Yost explained, "when we were looking for a climax for this episode, we came up with the idea of Tanner going back to basically kill him and get some money. We just thought if he's that crafty, maybe he has some kind of failsafe mechanism in his workshop. Given his age — we played that Arlo was a Vietnam vet — it just seemed appropriate. And we wanted stuff to blow up."

=== Casting ===
Despite being credited, Jacob Pitts, Erica Tazel and Natalie Zea do not appear in the episode as their respective characters.

== Reception ==
=== Viewers ===
In its original American broadcast, "Loose Ends" was seen by an estimated 2.26 million household viewers and gained a 0.9 ratings share among adults aged 18–49, according to Nielsen Media Research. This means that 0.9 percent of all households with televisions watched the episode. This was a 4% increase in viewership from the previous episode, which was watched by 2.16 million viewers with a 0.8 in the 18-49 demographics.

=== Critical reviews ===
"Loose Ends" received generally positive reviews from critics. Seth Amitin of IGN gave the episode a "good" 7.5 out of 10 and wrote, "'Loose Ends' was a decent episode. This wasn't television (or this series) at its finest, but it served its duty. It was entertaining and it helped push Season 3 into its final act. We also found out a little more about Ava and why she's with Boyd. Whether or not this factors into the ending of the season, well, we'll have to find out. But also Ellen Mae is alive and may put Tanner together with Quarles. Plus, Raylan will stop at nothing to get to Big Q. Away we go."

Scott Tobias of The A.V. Club gave the episode an "A−" grade and wrote, "The plotting in season three is getting awfully dense — to the point where I'll be looking to the comments immediately after posting to see what details I got wrong. Yet the various threads are also drawing much closer together, so Ava's actions and Tanner's actions this episode can have a ripple effect that runs through all the characters in Harlan. 'There's a war coming', says Raylan in the final scene. And with all these combustible elements starting to mix, the fuse on those fireworks has been lit." Kevin Fitzpatrick of Screen Crush wrote, "Sheesh, you'd think one person in Harlan County would be against all the warring factions that seem to cause havoc for Raylan and the police. The board is set, and the pieces are moving, and we've only a few more weeks to find out how Quarles attempts to enact his plans for domination, or at least how he gets his hair so blonde."

Alan Sepinwall of HitFix wrote, "While 'Loose Ends' moved a lot of pieces around, we still can't see the whole board in the way that Graham Yost and the writers can." Luke de Smet of Slant Magazine wrote, "Justified never shies away from telling you exactly what it's doing, and when it titles an episode 'Loose Ends', you can bet it will be all about tying up, well, loose ends. Given the particular brand of people who populate Harlan County, it's not surprising that the tying up of these loose ends involves landmines, shotguns, and more bodies pushed into the swamp. Nor is it surprising that it manages to tell us something about Justified's value system: Either you're your own man, or you're as good as dead."

Ben Lee of Digital Spy wrote, "Much like 'The Man Behind the Curtain' two weeks ago, 'Loose Ends' is more of a setup episode. It lacks a proper satisfying payoff and it's more interested in moving around the pieces to prepare for what is sure to be thrilling final few episodes, but the instalment does boast some great character development and interactions." Joe Reid of Vulture gave the episode a 3 star rating out of 5 and wrote, "As the title of the episode suggests, the characters around Harlan are looking to tie up loose ends. Which is awfully convenient since, preparing to enter the stretch run of season three, Justified needed to begin tying up loose ends of its own, disposing of some bodies, and beginning the nasty process of settling accounts."

Todd VanDerWerff of Los Angeles Times wrote, "If nothing else, Justified has a fine appreciation for the sorts of rusted-out ways that one might die in an old, abandoned junkyard." Dan Forcella of TV Fanatic gave the episode a 4 star rating out of 5 and wrote, "Since there were so many interesting and entertaining events during 'Loose Ends', I was surprised at my own reaction when it ended. I wasn't amazed, which has been my feeling following a number of Justified episodes during this middle stretch of the third season. It's been great, but during the majority of season two and the first three or four episodes this year, Justified was indescribably awesome. That level of quality is hard to achieve in back to back seasons."
