= The Gunfighter (Justified) =

- Justified episode
- Episode no.: Season 3 Episode 1
- Directed by: Michael Dinner
- Written by: Graham Yost & Fred Golan
- Cinematography by: Francis Kenny
- Editing by: Bill Johnson
- Original air date: January 17, 2012
- Running time: 43 minutes

Guest appearances
- Raymond J. Barry as Arlo Givens; Jeremy Davies as Dickie Bennett; Jere Burns as Wynn Duffy; Steven Flynn as Emmitt Arnett; Desmond Harrington as Fletcher Nix; Damon Herriman as Dewey Crowe; Mickey Jones as Rodney 'Hot Rod' Dunham; Richard Lineback as Delmer Coates; Kevin Rankin as Derek "Devil" Lennox; Neal McDonough as Robert Quarles

Episode chronology
← Previous "Bloody Harlan"	Next → "Cut Ties"
- Justified (season 3)

"The Gunfighter" is the first episode of the third season of the American Neo-Western television series Justified. It is the 27th overall episode of the series and was written by series developer Graham Yost and executive producer Fred Golan, whereas it was directed by executive producer Michael Dinner. It originally aired on FX on January 17, 2012.

The series is based on Elmore Leonard's stories about the character Raylan Givens, particularly "Fire in the Hole," which serves as the basis for the episode. The series follows Raylan Givens, a tough deputy U.S. Marshal enforcing his own brand of justice. The series revolves around the inhabitants and culture in the Appalachian Mountains area of eastern Kentucky, specifically Harlan County where many of the main characters grew up. In the episode, Raylan is still recovering from his gunshot wound but new enemies arrive at the area, threatening peace at Harlan.

According to Nielsen Media Research, the episode was seen by an estimated 3.07 million household viewers and gained a 1.0 ratings share among adults aged 18–49. The episode received very positive reviews from critics, who deemed it a promising start and praised the new villains on the show, highlighting Neal McDonough in particular.

== Plot ==
While driving, Winona (Natalie Zea) is pulled over by a police officer, who says that Mullen (Nick Searcy) wants to see her. She arrives at the hospital where Mullen informs her about Raylan (Timothy Olyphant) and his injuries. 3 weeks later, Raylan is still recovering and his shooting skills have been diminishing.

Raylan questions Boyd (Walton Goggins) about Mags Bennett's missing marijuana, to which Boyd denies any connection. Boyd wants Raylan to hand over Dickie (Jeremy Davies), as he let Raylan take him to find Loretta and Boyd wants to kill him for Ava's shooting. Raylan refuses, which prompts Boyd to brutally attack him in his office. The officers stop Boyd and arrest him. With his arrest, Ava (Joelle Carter) decides to get involved in his business. Meanwhile, Emmitt Arnett (Steven Flynn) is visited by Detroit enforcer Robert Quarles (Neal McDonough), who demands repayment for a failed real estate investment within 24 hours.

Arnett sends his enforcer Fletcher Nix (Desmond Harrington) to rob Delmer Coates (Richard Lineback) to pay back the Detroit mob. Nix uses a pizza delivery guy to enter, shuts off the security system as he worked on it, and forces Coates to hand over his collection of watches. Nix then kills Coates by stabbing his hand with an icepick and then leaves when he kills the pizza delivery guy. Tim (Jacob Pitts) asks Raylan for help in the case, revealing that the security system was installed by Wynn Duffy's (Jere Burns) company. Raylan reluctantly accompanies Tim as he remembers the last time he talked with Duffy. Duffy denies contacting Nix but later calls Arnett to question why he hired him, also warning him that Raylan will talk to him soon.

Ava has problems running Boyd's business, mostly due to Devil's (Kevin Rankin) insubordination. When Devil questions her leadership, Ava hits him in the head with a skillet. Raylan visits Arnett, unknowingly passing Nix in the building. Arnett is not there so he questions his secretary, who gives a possible location of Arnett's whereabouts. However, this is revealed to be part of a scheme orchestrated by Quarles. Arnett sends a bodyguard to the meeting while Nix sends a homeless man. The Marshals intercept them but realize that they have been fooled.

Raylan and Winona arrive at the hotel room, only to find Nix waiting for them at gunpoint. He forces Raylan to play the exact game he played with Coates. But Raylan knows Nix's intentions and tricks him into stabbing the table, allowing Raylan to take his gun and shoot Nix in the shoulder. Quarles meets with Arnett and Duffy and for his failure, kills Arnett and his secretary. In prison, Dickie and Dewey (Damon Herriman) are awaiting in the line when they see Boyd entering the prison towards his cell.

== Production ==
=== Development ===
In March 2011, FX renewed Justified for a third season. On its press release it said, "Justified was a critically acclaimed hit series in its first season, but the show has far surpassed our expectations this season." In November 2011, it was announced that the season would premiere on January 17, 2012. In December 2011, it was reported that the first episode of the third season would be titled "The Gunfighter", and was to be directed by executive producer Michael Dinner and written by series developer Graham Yost and executive producer Fred Golan.

=== Casting ===
In June 2011, Natalie Zea was confirmed to return to the season amidst contract negotiations. In October 2011, it was announced that Neal McDonough joined the series in a recurring role as Robert Quarles, "a Detroit mobster in a sharp suit who comes to Kentucky with visions of becoming a crimelord". In December 2011, Desmond Harrington was reported to have a secret guest role in the episode, only described as "a total badass boasting a deep Southern accent and ties to Jere Burns' Wynn Duffy." It was also reported in that month that Jere Burns would return as Wynn Duffy.

=== Writing ===
Walton Goggins previewed Boyd's actions in the episode and the season, saying "the old Boyd will be back in full in Season 3, and he will probably be in trouble sooner rather than later. There is no more shyness or healing to Boyd Crowder." Joelle Carter also talked about Ava's journey in the season, "within ourselves lies the strength to become the best person we can be, and sometimes you just need a little help finding that. This journey with Boyd and the love she's found is encouraging her to stand on her own two feet. And she might actually surprise Boyd in the end, too."

Series developer Graham Yost commented on the original plan for the beginning of the episode, "the first time we saw the episode, it began at the shooting range. Then we realized storywise that we wanted to have had Winona visit him in the hospital, and we decided let's shoot it. So our initial idea was starting the season over black with gunshots being fired, and then you come up and find Raylan in the range. We wanted to play with the reality of a guy being shot, that you don't just jump back into the line of duty." Part of the episode involved exploring the idea that Raylan is not perfect, although Yost deemed that one episode "was enough." The opening scene with Winona being stopped by a state trooper played a pivotal role a few episodes later, with "When the Guns Come Out" revealing she was planning on leaving Raylan.

He also described Fletcher Nix, stating "We liked the idea of this guy who was just a stone-cold killer with a typically Elmore Leonardian quirk to him, the ability to say things that are humorous without trying to be funny. And we also liked someone who has this sort of thing for gunfighters. The title of the episode is 'The Gunfighter'. He looks for this challenge, which is what brings him to the watch owner, and then what brings him to Raylan." While Yost expressed interest in bringing back the character, Nix was never seen again in the series. He also talked about Robert Quarles, "we wanted someone who had no connection to Kentucky, that Raylan didn't know, no one knew, and so there's no backstory or assumed friendliness or politeness. He's just a bad guy from the outside." The producers nicknamed Quarles as "The Carpetbagger", explaining "we just liked the idea of someone coming from outside thinking he could show these Kentucky yokels how crime is really done." The crew explained that Quarles' sleeve gun was inspired by Taxi Driver and viewed it as an example of "Chekhov's gun", "if a gun is introduced in the first act, it will go off in the third."

The original idea for the episode involved Raylan confronting Nix before the final scene. But Yost, Olyphant, director Michael Dinner and co-writer Fred Golan thought it "might be more interesting to have this near miss" at the elevator scene. Talking about Raylan's and Boyd's relationship, Yost commented, "it's obviously a complicated relationship, especially from Raylan's point-of-view, and there will be ramifications. You look ahead into episodes 7 and 8, there are problems that come from the relationship between Boyd and Raylan."

=== Filming ===
Filming for the episode and the season started on October 10, 2011.

The series began filming using the EPIC camera, manufactured by Red Digital Cinema Camera Company, with this episode. Director of photography Francis Kenny said, "We persuaded Sony Entertainment that by shooting with Epic cameras production would be increased tenfold and it would look spectacular." After filming the first two episodes of the season, Kenny said, "Episode one of season three is now complete and our dreams have come true. The show looks better than ever and the producers are now true believers of the Red System."

== Reception ==
=== Viewers ===
In its original American broadcast, "The Gunfighter" was seen by an estimated 3.07 million household viewers and gained a 1.0 ratings share among adults aged 18–49, according to Nielsen Media Research. This means that 1 percent of all households with televisions watched the episode. This was a 14% increase in viewership from the previous episode, which was watched by 2.68 million viewers with a 0.9/2 in the 18-49 demographics. But it was a 12% decrease in viewership from the previous season premiere, which was watched by 3.47 million viewers with a 1.3/4 in the 18-49 demographics.

=== Critical reviews ===
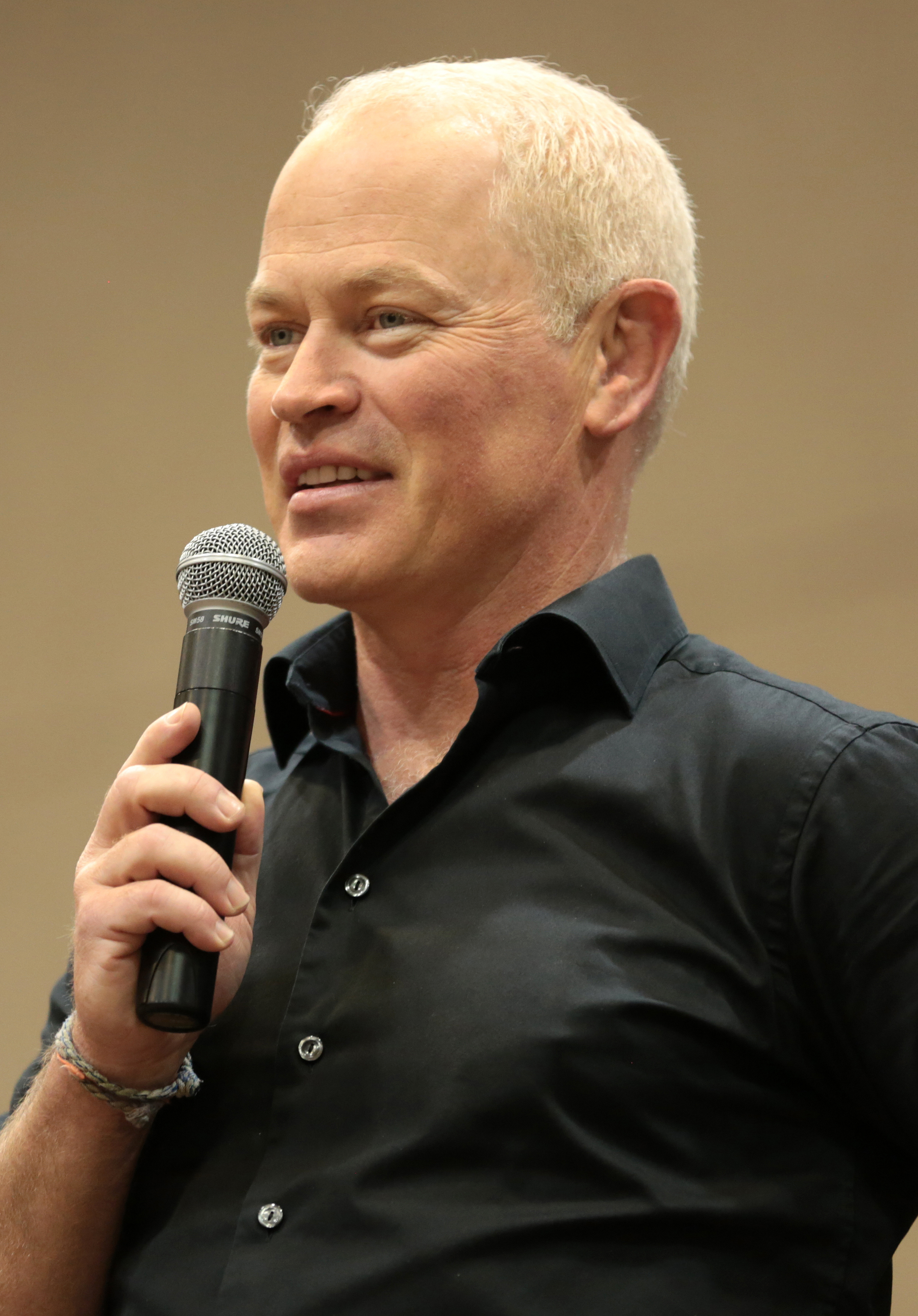
Neal McDonough's performance in the episode received praise from critics.

"The Gunfighter" received very positive reviews from critics. Seth Amitin of IGN gave the episode a "great" 8.5 out of 10 and wrote, "The writers have already shown awareness of what happened in Season 2 and have done more than just acknowledge that in this episode. There's a very clear sense that Season 2 was a set-up for future events and that things will continue moving in that direction. Whether or not they can create a recurring zen-like state of rolling set-up and punch remains to be seen. If they can capture that as well as they've captured the Kentucky scenery, well... this could become an amazing show."

Scott Tobias of The A.V. Club gave the episode a "B+" grade and wrote, "It remains to be seen whether McDonough will measure up to Mags, but along with an increased role for the great Jere Burns as Wynn Duffy, Justified seems poised to flood the zone with bad elements. Absent a singular presence like Martindale, an all-out turf between various toughs seems like a wise strategy, and the plotting in 'Gunslinger' remains as confident and suspenseful as ever. It'll be a busy season, with a few new characters and old ones emerging more prominently, but the show seems firmly in groove." James Queally of The Star-Ledger wrote, "The stage is set for another engaging season of Justified. I do have one major concern, but it has nothing to do with Justified itself, and everything to do with the network it's on. FX has a track record of weak third seasons, with The Shield and Sons of Anarchy turning in their weakest offerings during their junior years. But if 'The Gunfighter' and the rogues' gallery it offers is any indication of what's to come, we should be just fine."

Alan Sepinwall of HitFix wrote, "Justified is a show that does action well, but as cool as it is to see Raylan outdraw an opponent, or Tim to hit the apricot from long distance, I take the greatest satisfaction from watching the characters – good and bad, old and new – think their way out of predicaments in unexpected ways." Luke de Smet of Slant Magazine wrote, "Personally, I like Justified best when its stories are steeped in the tradition and mythology of Harlan County, and the idea of a central villain from Motor City isn't as immediately compelling as Mags and her family's tyranny. But Justified has repeatedly demonstrated its skill for setting into motion pieces that come together masterfully later on."

Ben Lee of Digital Spy wrote, "Season three gets off to a terrific start. Desmond Harrington was great as the chilling, ice pick-wielding Nix." Joe Reid of Vulture wrote, "Coming off of one of the strongest TV seasons of last year and having to live up to big expectations: These are classy problems for a show to have. Having to fill the void left after Margo Martindale's Mags Bennett took one last swig of applejack in the season-two finale is another classy problem, but one with real teeth as season three begins."

Ken Tucker of Entertainment Weekly wrote, "What Justified continues to capture so well is the mood of Elmore Leonard's early thrillers, like Fifty-Two Pick-Up and The Switch and Split Images: Nothing is overwrought; everyone resists mannerism; the violence in his stories is quick, quiet, and brutal — the kind that can strike you as being true and realistic even though the actions are utterly beyond your experience. How much better can popular entertainment get than that?" Todd VanDerWerff of Los Angeles Times wrote, "Until the final scene of the third-season premiere of Justified, I thought the episode was perhaps a touch too jumpy. It was working so hard to introduce characters, deal with the fallout from the end of Season 2, and catch us up with where the characters are three weeks after the end of that season that it occasionally felt a little breathless. And then Boyd Crowder strolled down the hall of the local prison, big grin on his face, and everything snapped into place. Man, it's nice to have this show back."

Dan Forcella of TV Fanatic gave the episode a 4.5 star rating out of 5 and wrote, "Competing with last year's magnificent second season - which I named the best show of 2011 - isn't going to be an easy task, but 'The Gunfighter' gave Justified a great start to season three, delivering an abundance of potential for interesting stories down the road."

Series developer Graham Yost called the scene between Raylan and Fletcher Nix in the hotel room as his favorite showdown of the series.
