= Coalition (Justified) =

- Justified episode
- Episode no.: Season 3 Episode 12
- Directed by: Bill Johnson
- Written by: Taylor Elmore
- Cinematography by: Richard Crudo
- Editing by: Keith Henderson
- Original air date: April 3, 2012
- Running time: 39 minutes

Guest appearances
- Raymond J. Barry as Arlo Givens; Jeremy Davies as Dickie Bennett; Jere Burns as Wynn Duffy; David Andrews as Sheriff Tillman Napier; Kaitlyn Dever as Loretta McCready; Gill Gayne as Bank Teller; Linda Gehringer as Helen Givens; David Meunier as Johnny Crowder; Demetrius Grosse as Errol; Cleavon R. McClendon III as Bernard; Peter Murnik as Trooper Tom Bergen; Mykelti Williamson as Ellstin Limehouse; Neal McDonough as Robert Quarles

Episode chronology
← Previous "Measures"	Next → "Slaughterhouse"
- Justified (season 3)

"Coalition" is the twelfth episode of the third season of the American Neo-Western television series Justified. It is the 38th overall episode of the series and was written by producer Taylor Elmore and directed by Bill Johnson. It originally aired on FX on April 3, 2012.

The series is based on Elmore Leonard's stories about the character Raylan Givens, particularly "Fire in the Hole", which serves as the basis for the episode. The series follows Raylan Givens, a tough deputy U.S. Marshal enforcing his own brand of justice. The series revolves around the inhabitants and culture in the Appalachian Mountains area of eastern Kentucky, specifically Harlan County where many of the main characters grew up. In the episode, Quarles escapes from his captors and while everyone is looking for him, Boyd enters into an uneasy alliance with Dickie in order to find Mags Bennett's money.

According to Nielsen Media Research, the episode was seen by an estimated 2.46 million household viewers and gained a 0.8 ratings share among adults aged 18–49. The episode received critical acclaim, who praised the pace, tone, writing, twists and acting. For his performance in the episode, Jeremy Davies won the Primetime Emmy Award for Outstanding Guest Actor in a Drama Series at the 64th Primetime Emmy Awards.

== Plot ==
Quarles (Neal McDonough) wakes up naked in the trailer and tied to the bed. He notices a bottle of Oxy and shares them with the two prostitutes watching over him. However, Quarles quickly overcomes his captors, locks them in the trailer and escapes. Raylan (Timothy Olyphant) finds the captors after Sheriff Napier (David Andrews) gives him a tip on Quarles' location.

Boyd (Walton Goggins) is visited by Errol (Demetrius Grosse) and Dickie (Jeremy Davies) at the bar and he immediately tries to kill Dickie by suffocating him. He then releases him when they realize that they come for help in finding the $3 million, although Arlo (Raymond J. Barry) still wants to kill Dickie for killing Helen but Ava (Joelle Carter) supports Boyd's decision. Boyd sends Ava and Arlo to case a bank that may have Mags' money, attracting the attention of State Trooper Tom Bergen (Peter Murnik), who informs Raylan. Boyd and Duffy (Jere Burns) discover that Quarles escaped and Boyd sets out a new plan: Quarles will meet with Duffy and will plant a bomb on his car. This is also part of Boyd's bank plan, as authorities will investigate the bombing while they rob the bank.

Quarles visits Limehouse (Mykelti Williamson), who tells him that Boyd will rob the bank and he should kill him just as he exits the bank to get the money. Raylan also visits Limehouse, who states that he knows Quarles and Boyd will get themselves killed but Limehouse won't interfere as it will reduce his competition. At the bar, Boyd confronts Errol as he deduced that there was no money in the bank. Errol confesses that Limehouse wanted Boyd to rob the bank so he could be sent to jail again. Arlo's mind continues deteriorating, confusing Boyd for Raylan, hallucinating conversations with Helen (Linda Gehringer) and pulling a gun on Ava. This forces Boyd to leave bar and head to his house. He saves Ava, who was trapped in a closet but Arlo is nowhere to be found.

At the bar, Dickie knocks Johnny (David Meunier) out and forces Errol to take him to the house where the money is. At the same time, Boyd and Raylan are notified the real location of the money: the money was with Loretta (Kaitlyn Dever) at her house. Dickie and Errol arrive and Dickie forces Errol to lock himself in the trunk. He enters the house, only to find Raylan waiting for him, gun at hand. Raylan notes that Dickie will go back to prison, citing all the things he did in the very same day. Dickie tries to pull his gun out but Raylan is faster and shoots him. The gunshot's impact throws Dickie outside, where Limehouse is seated, as he told Raylan the location.

Raylan talks with Loretta in the office, deciding to let her keep the money, but warns her to be cautious with it. Realizing the bank job was a setup, Quarles goes to Boyd's bar, where Duffy blows up Quarles' car, knocking Boyd out and drawing Trooper Tom. He orders Quarles to drop his weapon, and a shot rings out. Raylan arrives moments later to find Tom fatally wounded, Quarles gone, Boyd unconscious, and Johnny yelling that Quarles shot Tom.

== Production ==
=== Development ===
In March 2012, it was reported that the twelfth episode of the third season would be titled "Coalition", and was to be directed by Bill Johnson and written by producer Taylor Elmore.

=== Writing ===
Writer Taylor Elmore wrote the episode in two days due to dental surgery. The scene involving Quarles and the prostitutes was the first written scene and while the writers tweaked aspects of the script, the scene remained intact.

Series developer Graham Yost explained that there were different plans for the episode, "there was gonna be a big robbery of mining machinery and all this stuff, but we knew we wanted Limehouse to be setting up both Quarles and Boyd. That was our goal. That was the way he was gonna deal with them: Set them up, and have them get arrested. It doesn't really work out that way because Boyd's a little bit smarter and Quarles is a cockroach. So then we came up with the idea of a bank and a safe deposit box."

=== Casting ===
The episode marked the return of Loretta McCready, last seen in "The Devil You Know", which was teased by Yost. Despite being credited, Nick Searcy, Jacob Pitts, Erica Tazel and Natalie Zea do not appear in the episode as their respective characters.

=== Filming ===
While the episode was the twelfth episode of the season to air, it was actually the eleventh to be produced. Yost said that it was done as it "was farther along in the writing process."

== Reception ==
=== Viewers ===
In its original American broadcast, "Coalition" was seen by an estimated 2.46 million household viewers and gained a 0.8 ratings share among adults aged 18–49, according to Nielsen Media Research. This means that 0.8 percent of all households with televisions watched the episode. This was a slight decrease in viewership from the previous episode, which was watched by 2.49 million viewers with a 0.9 in the 18-49 demographics.

=== Critical reviews ===
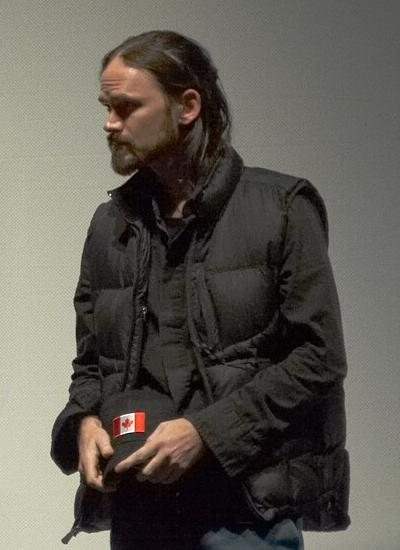
Jeremy Davies's performance in the episode was praised by critics. He would win the Primetime Emmy Award for Outstanding Guest Actor in a Drama Series.

"Coalition" received critical acclaim. Seth Amitin of IGN gave the episode an "amazing" 9 out of 10 and wrote, "In 'Coalition', common enemies make strange bedfellows. It's a great episode. Three separate incidents led to three characters driving the plot of the episode and everything dovetailed into a beautiful ending for the penultimate episode, with a small cliffhanger for our ending."

Scott Tobias of The A.V. Club gave the episode a "B+" grade and wrote, "I continue to struggle with the bigger picture, but it's hard to deny the confidence and momentum the show has gathered for the finale. Should be a doozy." Kevin Fitzpatrick of Screen Crush wrote, "Boy, somebody's got to kill that Robert Quarles already! And I don't imagine Boyd Crowder to be the type easily taking to the role of prisoner, so who will be the one to ultimately put a bullet in ol' blondie bear? Is Arlo long for this world, having gone off his meds to go after Dickie Bennett himself? And what of poor officer Tom? Or that preggers Winona? We need answers, people."

Alan Sepinwall of HitFix wrote, "Ninety-five percent of 'Coalition' was certified brilliance, and the kind of plotting you get at the climax to the best Elmore Leonard stories." Luke de Smet of Slant Magazine wrote, "Season three has been the program's most ambitious to date, and for that reason it's easy to forgive its imperfections. But there's a price to pay for being too ambitious, which we see in an episode like 'Coalition', which, though exciting, is too busy to provide us with the sort of quiet, well-paced, and compelling scenes we became accustomed to."

Ben Lee of Digital Spy wrote, "After last week's slight misstep, Justified pulls a brilliant episode out of the bag. Unlike 'Measures', 'Coalition' was unpredictable and kept you guessing." Joe Reid of Vulture wrote, "In a season full of strange bedfellows, Justified managed to shuffle the deck again this week, with a rapid-fire series of deals, schemes, and setups. It all seemed to be barreling toward at least a few of Harlan's bad guys getting swept off the table. That it ended with everybody more or less intact makes me wonder if the show isn't super confident in any one antagonist at this point. But it leaves us with no shortage of scenarios for next week's season finale."

Todd VanDerWerff of Los Angeles Times wrote, "'Coalition', the next-to-last episode of this season of Justified, is a heist movie without the heist. Sure, lots of characters talk about robbing $3 million that's just sitting in a vault in a bank that's apparently easy to rob. But all of that turns out to be a bunch of setups piled on top of other setups. No banks are broken into. No money is robbed. There are the requisite double-crosses and characters stabbing each other in the back, but we don't see any insane plan to break into the safety deposit room and break open the box containing the millions. It's still awesome, nonetheless." Dan Forcella of TV Fanatic gave the episode a 4.5 star rating out of 5 and wrote, "It may have seemed like Ellstin Limehouse was too busy cutting up pigs to know what was going on in Kentucky recently, and it definitely seemed like his right hand man Errol had decided to rise up against the boss last week, but 'Coalition' proved that it was all part of the good butcher's master plan." Jack McKinney of Paste gave the episode a 9 out of 10 rating and wrote, "In the end, it all comes down to character. Character, as Heraclitus said, is destiny. We should know exactly how things are going to end up, seeing as we know these characters like we're related to them at this point. Yet somehow nothing ever seems to go quite like I imagine it on this show."
