= When the Guns Come Out =

- Justified episode
- Episode no.: Season 3 Episode 6
- Directed by: Don Kurt
- Story by: Nichelle Tramble Spellman
- Teleplay by: Nichelle Tramble Spellman & Dave Andron
- Cinematography by: Francis Kenny
- Editing by: Steve Polivka
- Original air date: February 21, 2012
- Running time: 42 minutes

Guest appearances
- Raymond J. Barry as Arlo Givens; Jere Burns as Wynn Duffy; William Mapother as Delroy Baker; David Meunier as Johnny Crowder; Stephen Root as Judge Mike Reardon; Demetrius Grosse as Errol; Abby Miller as Ellen May; Peter Murnik as Trooper Tom Bergen; Mykelti Williamson as Ellstin Limehouse; Neal McDonough as Robert Quarles

Episode chronology
← Previous "Thick as Mud"	Next → "The Man Behind the Curtain"
- Justified (season 3)

"When the Guns Come Out" is the sixth episode of the third season of the American Neo-Western television series Justified. It is the 32nd overall episode of the series and was written by executive story editor Nichelle Tramble Spellman and co-executive producer Dave Andron from a story by Spellman and directed by producer Don Kurt. It originally aired on FX on February 21, 2012.

The series is based on Elmore Leonard's stories about the character Raylan Givens, particularly "Fire in the Hole", which serves as the basis for the episode. The series follows Raylan Givens, a tough deputy U.S. Marshal enforcing his own brand of justice. The series revolves around the inhabitants and culture in the Appalachian Mountains area of eastern Kentucky, specifically Harlan County where many of the main characters grew up. In the episode, Raylan tries to find Winona while also having to deal with an Oxy robbery at one of Boyd's clinics. Despite being credited, Erica Tazel does not appear in the episode.

According to Nielsen Media Research, the episode was seen by an estimated 2.02 million household viewers and gained a 0.8 ratings share among adults aged 18–49. The episode received positive reviews from critics, who praised the character development although some expressed a mixed response at Winona's storyline and actions.

== Plot ==
Trixie and Ellen May (Abby Miller) arrive at a clinic to seduce a doctor for Oxy. However, hitmen arrive at the clinic, kill Trixie and the doctor and steal the Oxy pills while Ellen hides under the desk and avoids being assassinated. At the bar, Johnny (David Meunier) thinks Quarles (Neal McDonough) is responsible but Boyd (Walton Goggins) remains skeptical despite the fact that he owns the clinic.

Raylan (Timothy Olyphant) is told by Judge Reardon (Stephen Root) that Winona (Natalie Zea) has quit her job at the courthouse. He then checks the evidence room to find that stolen money he helped Winona return is missing. Coupled with a Costa Rica trip on her computer, he deduces she plans to escape. He is also notified of the clinic shooting by Mullen (Nick Searcy), as it occurred on his Aunt Helen's property. He is also briefed by Tim (Jacob Pitts) that he investigated Quarles with help from the FBI, using Raylan's name. Ellen May returns to her pimp, Delroy Baker (William Mapother), who forces her to go to another clinic for Oxy. She arrives at a clinic but immediately leaves when she recognizes that one of the killers are running the clinic. For her failure, Delroy hits her in the head.

Quarles finds that he is being investigated and suspects Raylan, telling Duffy (Jere Burns) to investigate about him while he enters a room to punch a kidnapped man in his bedroom. Thanks to a tip from Limehouse (Mykelti Williamson), Ava (Joelle Carter) goes to a bar to talk with Ellen May but she is nowhere to be found and refuses Delroy's advances. A co-worker tells her about Ellen May's abuse and tells her about being involved in the shooting. Raylan visits Arlo (Raymond J. Barry), who is now disoriented and talks to himself, who says he worked with Boyd on their activities. He confronts Boyd about this, telling him to stop using his family for his illegal activities, threatening to kill him. Boyd then directs Raylan to talk to Ava.

Raylan and Ava track down Ellen and convince her to help him after threatening Delroy. He confronts one of the hitmen, Tanner (Brendan McCarthy), at his clinic but he gets into a fight on his trailer while is being towed away. The fight ends when Raylan throws Tanner out of the window and shoots the driver, but Tanner escapes. Duffy discusses these events with Quarles, who makes it clear that he wasn't involved in anything. But Quarles thinks Raylan is on Boyd's payroll, as Arlo is also working with him and is ecstatic at the prospect of war. That night, Limehouse confronts his assistant, who reveals he gave up Boyd's Oxy clinic to Tanner. Refusing to simply execute his henchman, Limehouse assures him he will be on the front line to watch what he started.

Raylan finally finds Winona at her sister's house. To Raylan's surprise, Winona didn't take the money and never planned to leave the country. She explains she left as Raylan couldn't change who he is or his profession, stating that if he wanted to, he would've done it already. That night, Raylan and Mullen talk and realize that the elderly evidence clerk fled to Mexico with the money when one of the bills pops up in El Paso, Texas. The episode ends with the clerk enjoying his new place in Mexico.

== Production ==
=== Development ===
In January 2012, it was reported that the sixth episode of the third season would be titled "When the Guns Come Out", and was to be directed by producer Don Kurt and written by executive story editor Nichelle Tramble Spellman and co-executive producer Dave Andron from a story by Spellman.

=== Writing ===
Series developer Graham Yost previewed that Winona's actions in "Save My Love" and Tanner Dodd would play a pivotal role in the episode. He also stated that the opening scene of "The Gunfighter" would be addressed eventually, with the episode revealing that Winona was planning on leaving Raylan. The intention of the episode involved the characters addressing, with Yost saying, "we wanted them to part as adults who love each other, but who can only take it so far given his line of work."

He also coined the idea of suspecting Winona as stealing the money, "I think the people who have problems with the character might've jumped to that conclusion, and that was something that we were playing with." Having Charlie steal the money was a way to get Raylan to suspect Winona and track her down, describing that Charlie taking it "would be the most fun way to go."

=== Casting ===
A few weeks before the airing of the episode, William Mapother was announced to be guest starring in the show as "an Oxy-addicted, woman-beating bar owner."

== Reception ==
=== Viewers ===
In its original American broadcast, "When the Guns Come Out" was seen by an estimated 2.02 million household viewers and gained a 0.8 ratings share among adults aged 18–49, according to Nielsen Media Research. This means that 0.8 percent of all households with televisions watched the episode. This was a 6% decrease in viewership from the previous episode, which was watched by 2.13 million viewers with a 0.8 in the 18-49 demographics.

=== Critical reviews ===
"When the Guns Come Out" received positive reviews from critics. Seth Amitin of IGN gave the episode a "great" 8 out of 10 and wrote, "Seriously, this is great strategic writing and the attention to details in everything before it gets on screen is mystifying. I wish more people were watching this."

Scott Tobias of The A.V. Club gave the episode a "B+" grade and wrote, "As with last week, 'When The Guns Come Out' moves like a shot, powered by a strong episodic plot that ripples through all corners of Harlan."

Alan Sepinwall of HitFix wrote, "It's interesting to see an episode like 'When the Guns Come Out', where you have one character in Limehouse who knows pretty much everything because he's made it his business to do so, and a bunch of other characters who think they know what's going on, but are working on bad information." Luke de Smet of Slant Magazine wrote, "Whether it be the mastermind behind the attack on Boyd's clinic, Winona's discontent, or the mere presence of the gun hidden up Quarles's sleeve, the key elements this season seem to be the things the characters don't know."

Ben Lee of Digital Spy wrote, "'When the Guns Come Out' is the weakest episode so far in an otherwise exceptional season, but the wait for next week will be even more difficult with numerous threads left dangling. It's also saying something that even the slightly disappointing instalments still outshine the vast majority of other television airing today." Joe Reid of Vulture wrote, "They [Raylan and Winona] come to no resolution by episode's end, but at the very least I emerged from the episode pulling for them to get it together in a way I haven't for a long time."

Todd VanDerWerff of Los Angeles Times wrote, "The idea of the reckless lawman whose personal life is a mess, even as he's incredibly good at his job, is one of the oldest cliches in the book. On Justified, Raylan's relationship with Winona has always hinged on this idea, and the series often has seemed a bit hesitant to really embrace it, perhaps because it knows there's very little new territory to explore here." Dan Forcella of TV Fanatic gave the episode a 4 star rating out of 5 and wrote, "This was the first time in season three's early run that I wasn't jumping up and down with excitement during and after an episode of Justified. That's not to say that 'When the Guns Come Out' wasn't still great, because it was." Jack McKinney of Paste gave the episode a 8.5 rating out of 10 and wrote, "The writers had a little fun this week with the whole 'finding-ways-to-let-Raylan-off-the-hook-for-killing-people' thing. The scene where Raylan asks Art for time off is a gem not only because Nick Searcy is hysterical, but also because it plays as the writers speaking directly to the audience as Art lays out all the ways that the shooting was Justified and how it wasn't Raylan's fault, etc. Clever, funny stuff."
