= Cut Ties =

- Justified episode
- Episode no.: Season 3 Episode 2
- Directed by: Michael Watkins
- Written by: Benjamin Cavell
- Cinematography by: Francis Kenny
- Editing by: Keith Henderson
- Original air date: January 24, 2012
- Running time: 40 minutes

Guest appearances
- Mykelti Williamson as Ellstin Limehouse; Jeremy Davies as Dickie Bennett; Clayne Crawford as Lance; Michael Harding as Marshal Bill Nichols; Damon Herriman as Dewey Crowe; Frank John Hughes as Terry Powe; Bonnie Root as Mary Archer; Todd Stashwick as Ash Murphy; Lenny Citrano as Little Joe Delahunt; Demetrius Grosse as Errol; Cleavon R. McClendon III as Bernard; Carla Gugino as Assistant Director Karen Goodall

Episode chronology
← Previous "The Gunfighter"	Next → "Harlan Roulette"
- Justified (season 3)

"Cut Ties" is the second episode of the third season of the American Neo-Western television series Justified. It is the 28th overall episode of the series and was written by co-producer Benjamin Cavell and directed by Michael Watkins. It originally aired on FX on January 24, 2012.

The series is based on Elmore Leonard's stories about the character Raylan Givens, particularly "Fire in the Hole", which serves as the basis for the episode. The series follows Raylan Givens, a tough deputy U.S. Marshal enforcing his own brand of justice. The series revolves around the inhabitants and culture in the Appalachian Mountains area of eastern Kentucky, specifically Harlan County where many of the main characters grew up. In the episode, the Marshals work to investigate the death of a federal Marshal and puts Raylan into contact with a figure of his past. Meanwhile, in prison, Boyd tries to reach Dickie to confront him. Despite being credited, Jacob Pitts does not appear in the episode.

According to Nielsen Media Research, the episode was seen by an estimated 2.71 million household viewers and gained a 0.9 ratings share among adults aged 18–49. The episode received positive reviews from critics, despite the main case receiving a lukewarm response, critics were enthusiastic about Carla Gugino's performance in the episode, reprising her title role from the 2003 crime drama Karen Sisco.

== Plot ==
Boyd (Walton Goggins) is about to try to kill Dickie (Jeremy Davies) in prison when he is interrupted by a visit from Raylan (Timothy Olyphant). Raylan knows Boyd intends to kill Dickie and tells him he is changing his testimony, which will make Boyd free by the next day. Boyd also finds that Dickie has been moved to solitary confinement and suspects Raylan was involved.

U.S. Marshal Bill Nichols (Michael Harding) visits Mary Archer (Bonnie Root) at her house, who is part of the Witness Protection Program as she intends to testify against Carlos Salazar. Nichols leaves but confronts a man (Frank John Hughes), who has been following. The man shoots Nichols, who dies from his wounds. Raylan is notified of the case but meets Assistant Director Karen Goodall (née Sisco) (Carla Gugino), a figure of his past who is also investigating the case. Worrying that Nichols may have given out the location of some witnesses, the team decides to pursue the other two witnesses. Rachel (Erica Tazel) is assigned to accompany Mary at her house.

Raylan and Karen visit a criminal, Little Joe Delahunt (Lenny Citrano) while Mullen visits a witness, Terry Powe. Unbeknownst to him, Powe is the man who killed Nichols. After realizing that Little Joe is nearby, Mullen escorts Powe out of his house. During the car trip, Mullen uses the car's GPS to find that Powe was at the same place and time as Nichols' death. Powe attacks him but Mullen overpowers him and handcuffs him. He learns that Powe was trying to buy back into the business and he sold the identity and location of another witness to raise the funds.

Boyd, intent on being close to Dickie, instigates a fight with inmates due to his white supremacy tattoos and is sent to solitary confinement, right next to Dickey. Boyd bribes a guard to release him from his cell and attacks Dickie in his cell. Instead of killing him, Boyd wants the location of Mags' money. Dickie explains that the money is being held by one of Mags' trustee friends, crime boss Ellstin Limehouse, and he will not give the money to anyone other than Dickie himself.

Two hitmen arrive at Mary's house and Rachel takes her and her children to the attic to protect themselves. Mary's baby's crying causes them to be found by one of the hitmen, but Rachel kills him. Raylan, Karen and Mullen arrive at the house and kill the other one. Raylan meets with Winona (Natalie Zea) at the office, which makes Karen uncomfortable. Boyd is released from prison and is picked up by Ava (Joelle Carter), telling her that Limehouse has the money. That night, Limehouse (Mykelti Williamson) confronts one of his guards who slept during his shift. He gives the man two choices: have his hand thrusted in lye (but settling his debt) or never committing the mistake (but promising to kill him if he does it again). The man chooses the latter and Limehouse allows him to go.

== Production ==
=== Development ===
In December 2011, it was reported that the second episode of the third season would be titled "Cut Ties", and was to be directed by Michael Watkins and written by co-producer Benjamin Cavell.

=== Writing ===
Series developer Graham Yost said that the episode would explain Boyd's intentions in prison, revealed to be looking for Mags Bennett's money.

Yost commented on Art Mullen's role in the episode, "we wanted to see where Art came from, how he started out, what kind of marshal he was before he settled down, 'cause a lot of this is the question of what's Raylan gonna do: Is he gonna settle down with Winona? Is that the way his life is gonna go? And here's Art showing that's the choice he made, essentially. And we just thought it'd be fun to see Nick [Searcy] be badass because he's such a great guy and such a great actor."

Raylan's and Winona's kiss was open to interpretation according to Yost, "like hopefully anything in this show—we're giving everything a lot of thought—you hope that it accomplishes a couple things. I think he is showing Goodall, but I think he's also showing Winona. I think he's showing himself. I think there's something to be said if you feel you have to show yourself and you have to prove this, then there's some questions going on. It hopefully has a lot of meaning."

=== Casting ===
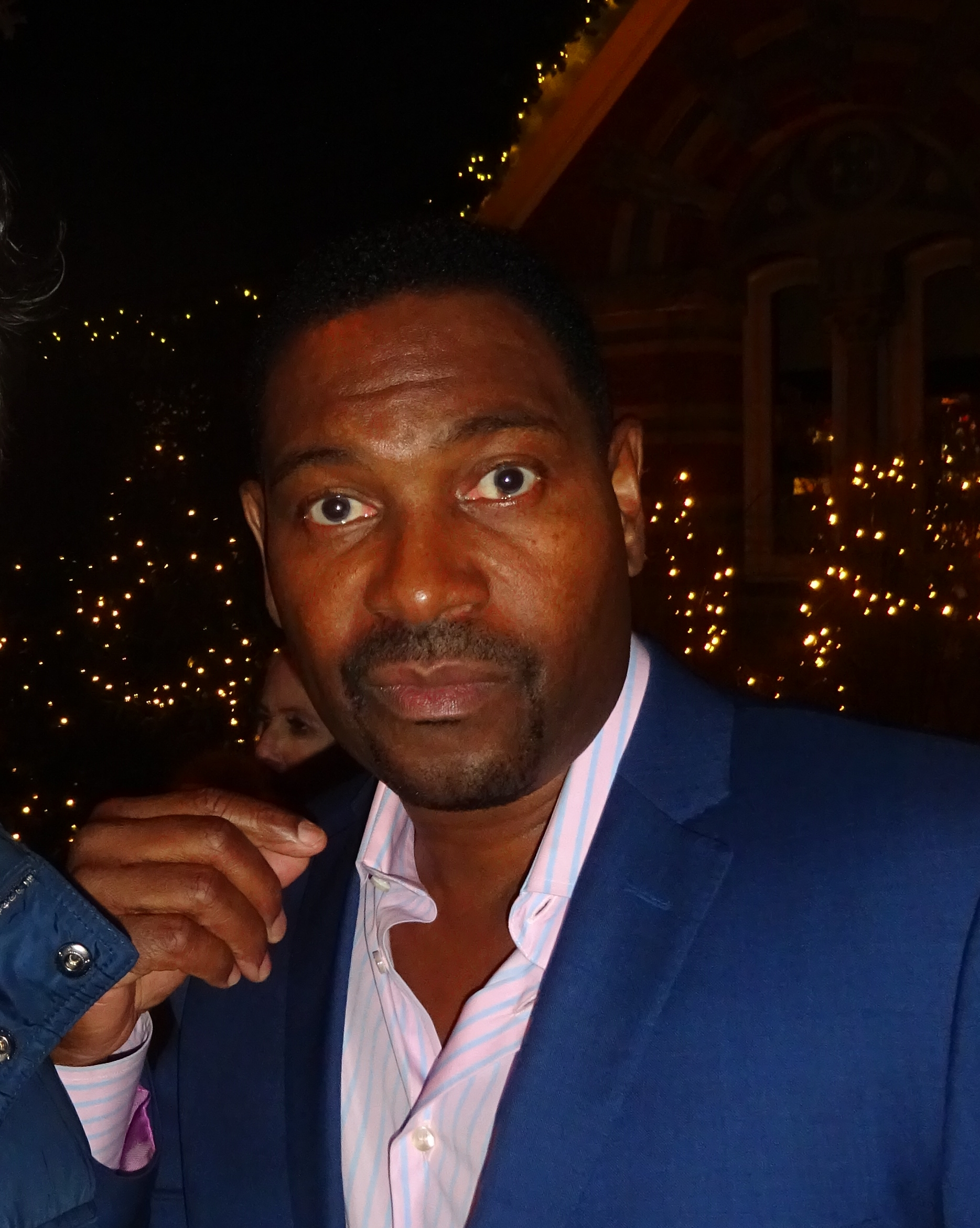
The episode marked Mykelti Williamson's debut in the series, a role he would play during the third, fourth and sixth season.

In October 2011, it was reported that Carla Gugino was joining the series in the recurring role of Karen Goodall, "a Washington, D.C.–based assistant director of the U.S. Marshals Service who used to work with Raylan back in Miami—and as such shares a history with our favorite trigger-happy lawman." Gugino previously worked on Karen Sisco in the title role, another adaptation of Elmore Leonard's works. Karen Sisco premiered in 2003 and despite positive reviews, it was cancelled after 10 episodes. Yost explained, "we're big fans of Carla, she enjoyed playing a marshal, we thought it would be fun to have her play a marshal again." The name change was necessary as FX did not own the rights to the Karen Sisco character, or her stories. Despite Yost expressing interest in having Gugino return to the series, she never appeared again in the series.

In October 2011, it was announced that Mykelti Williamson joined the series in a recurring role as Ellstin Limehouse, "a man who lives in a small black town in Harlan County and who will do whatever it takes, legal or otherwise, to protect his holler." The writers started creating the character in an attempt to fix a certain lack of African-American characters in the series. Executive story producer Nichelle Tramble Spellman discovered about Coe Ridge Colony, a refuge for African Americans, Native Americans, and disenfranchised white women against the persecutions of society, giving the writers the idea to create Noble's Holler. Limehouse's name was inspired by a fictional character named Limehouse, an African-American man who was sent down into the deep South to recruit sharecroppers to work in the mines. Joelle Carter described the character as "The Godfather of 'the other side of the tracks'" On Limehouse, Yost wanted the character to be more ambiguous in contrast to Quarles, further adding, "we started looking into the black communities in Harlan, much to many's surprise that there are any. As soon as we started to come close to this character, I thought of Mykelti Williamson."

== Reception ==
=== Viewers ===
In its original American broadcast, "Cut Ties" was seen by an estimated 2.71 million household viewers and gained a 0.9 ratings share among adults aged 18–49, according to Nielsen Media Research. This means that 0.9 percent of all households with televisions watched the episode. This was a 12% decrease in viewership from the previous episode, which was watched by 3.07 million viewers with a 1.0 in the 18-49 demographics.

=== Critical reviews ===
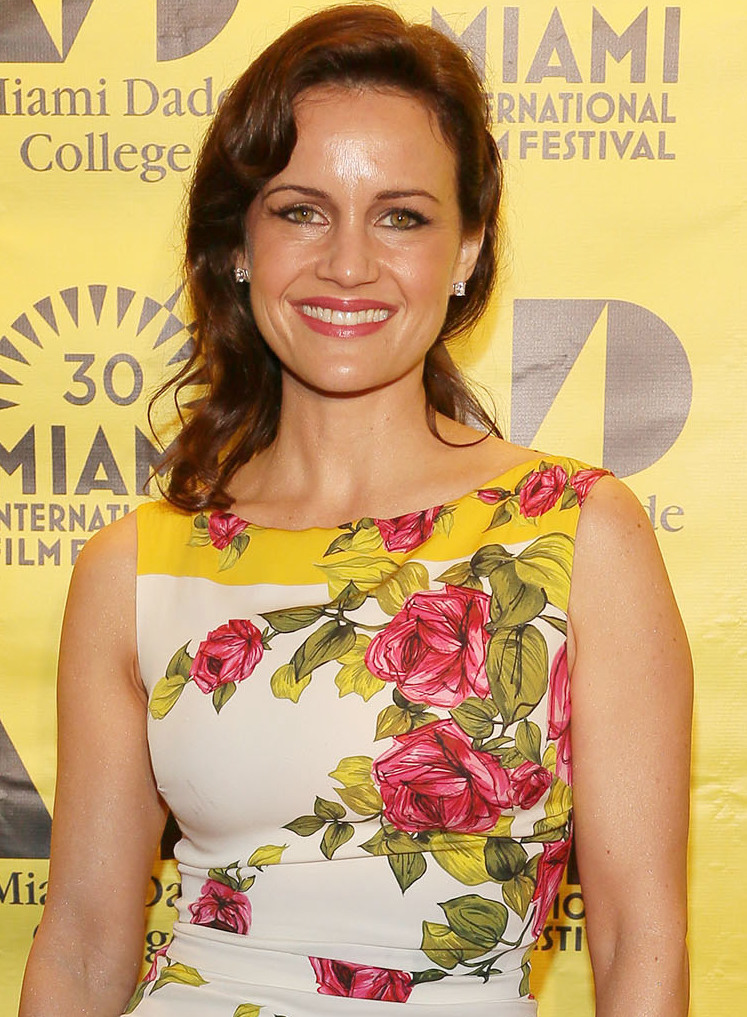
The episode was Carla Gugino's second work in an adaptation of Elmore Leonard after the short-lived Karen Sisco, reprising her role as the title character in a guest role. Reception to her performance in the episode was near-unanimously positive.

"Cut Ties" received positive reviews from critics. Seth Amitin of IGN gave the episode a "good" 7.5 out of 10 and wrote, "'Cut Ties' wasn't a profound episode, but we're still early in the season and exposition is expected. We also found out that Art and Raylan both know what Quarles did last week (apparently the carpet has been changed and the ground beneath it bleached) and that should provide some fun down the line. There's a lot of balls in the air here, but it seems like the writers are good enough to catch 'em all."

Scott Tobias of The A.V. Club gave the episode a "B+" grade and wrote, "These early episodes have to do quite a lot of gruntwork and it seems obvious to me, as it did with Breaking Bad early in seasons three and four, that more transcendent hours will come down the line. For now, I'm happy to see how gracefully the writers have integrated new characters and overarching stories into sharp episodic payoffs—last week with Fletcher Nix and Emmitt Arnett, this week with the leaks in the Witness Protection Program." James Queally of The Star-Ledger wrote, "All in all, 'Cut Ties' is a strong episode that hopefully let some new fans get in on the fun. With the mention of Arnett's murder by Art near the end of the episode, I'd imagine we are heading back to the main Dixie Mafia plot next week, so hopefully the rookie fans can jump right in."

Alan Sepinwall of HitFix wrote, "'Cut Ties' is a good signpost for the evolution of Justified. On one level, it's the exact kind of episode the show was doing early in its first season—and even early in its second (albeit with Mags and the boys running around in the background)—and the main case with Art investigating the murder of an old colleague was actually quite good as those standalone stories go." Luke de Smet of Slant Magazine wrote, "The case-of-the-week A-plot of 'Cut Ties', the second episode of Justified's third season, doesn't have much meat on it. It's another episode set mostly in Lexington and featuring a lot of characters we'll never see again, but it nonetheless manages to further complicate the power struggle brewing in Harlan."

Ben Lee of Digital Spy wrote, "'Cut Ties' is another strong instalment of Justified with great guest spots from Carla Gugino and Mykelti Williamson." Joe Reid of Vulture wrote, "So I should probably get this out of the way right now: I never watched Karen Sisco during its short run on ABC. I'm sorry! I was part of the problem! I loved Out of Sight, though, and I have loved Carla Gugino in such terrible movies as Sucker Punch and Snake Eyes and Son in Law... No, you're right, Son in Law was not terrible. But the point remains: I don't need to be sold on the idea that adding Gugino's Karen Sisco—sorry, Karen Goodall, wink-wink—to the Justified universe is a good idea. After just one episode, I'll go so far as to say it's a great idea."

Todd VanDerWerff of Los Angeles Times wrote, "It's sometimes easy to miss just how much Justified is about people who constantly have to wade through the muck and keep their heads just above it. Episodes like 'Cut Ties' make it clear that all of these marshals have very different ways of not getting dragged down." Dan Forcella of TV Fanatic gave the episode a 4 star rating out of 5 and wrote, "I said last week that a staple of Justified is its charismatic, ruthless bad guys. Between McDonough and Williamson, I think we will once again be in for such a treat. While "Cut Ties" might have shifted down after the season premiere, it still continued the fantastic start to Justified's third season." Jack McKinney of Paste gave the episode a 8.5 rating out of 10 and wrote, "A lot of things are different in Harlan County this season. Our lead cowboy, Raylan Givens, can't shoot straight because he got shot, the main bad guy is a smooth-talking businessman in a suit, and Boyd Crowder not only wants to stay in jail, he wants to be put in solitary. The overall quality of the show is different as well. It's better than ever."
