= Justified season 3 =

Justified
- Season 3
- Season 3 DVD cover
- No. of episodes: 13

Release
- Original network: FX
- Original release: January 17 – April 10, 2012

Season chronology
- ← Previous; Season 2 Next → Season 4

The third season of the American neo-Western television series Justified premiered on January 17, 2012, on FX, and concluded on April 10, 2012, consisting of 13 episodes. The series was developed by Graham Yost based on Elmore Leonard's novels Pronto and Riding the Rap and his short story "Fire in the Hole". Its main character is Raylan Givens, a deputy U.S. Marshal. Timothy Olyphant portrays Givens, a tough federal lawman, enforcing his own brand of justice in his Kentucky hometown. The series is set in the city of Lexington, Kentucky, and the hill country of eastern Kentucky, specifically in and around Harlan.

== Cast and characters ==
=== Main ===
- Timothy Olyphant as Raylan Givens, a suave deputy U.S. marshal who runs afoul of a dangerous Detroit-based mobster
- Nick Searcy as Art Mullen, the chief deputy of Lexington's marshals office.
- Joelle Carter as Ava Crowder, Boyd's lover who begins to take an interest in his operations.
- Jacob Pitts as Tim Gutterson, a Lexington deputy marshal.
- Erica Tazel as Rachel Brooks, a Lexington deputy marshal.
- Natalie Zea as Winona Hawkins, Raylan's pregnant ex-wife who, despite becoming re-involved with him, begins having doubts about their relationship.
- Walton Goggins as Boyd Crowder, Raylan's intelligent nemesis who begins to take over Harlan's criminal underground.

=== Recurring ===
- Neal McDonough as Robert Quarles, an unstable Detroit Mob lieutenant who intends to take over Harlan.
- Demetrius Grosse as Errol, Limehouse's untrustworthy lieutenant.
- Mykelti Williamson as Ellstin Limehouse, a scheming crime boss who other criminals entrust to hold their money.
- David Meunier as Johnny Crowder, Boyd's paraplegic cousin who works alongside him.
- Jere Burns as Wynn Duffy, a volatile and dangerous Dixie Mafia enforcer who begins working for Quarles.
- Raymond J. Barry as Arlo Givens, Raylan's criminal father who begins losing his mind after the murder of his wife.
- Jeremy Davies as Dickie Bennett, the last of the criminal Bennett family who plots to get his inheritance.
- Jonathan Kowalsky as Mike Cosmatopolis, Duffy's bodyguard.
- David Andrews as Tillman Napier, Harlan's sheriff who is up for re-election.
- Brendan McCarthy as Tanner Dodd, Quarles's duplicitous henchman.
- Damon Herriman as Dewey Crowe, a dim-witted criminal who befriends Dickie in prison.
- Jesse Luken as Jimmy Tolan, Boyd's henchman.
- Abby Miller as Ellen May, a naive prostitute who becomes involved in Harlan's criminal underground after witnessing a robbery.
- Jim Beaver as Shelby Parlow, Boyd's former foreman who he backs for county sheriff against Napier.
- Jenn Lyon as Lindsey Salazar, a bartender for the High Note who Raylan becomes sexually involved with.
- Peter Murnik as Tom Bergen, Raylan's state trooper friend.
- Todd Stashwick as Ash Murphy, a corrupt prison guard who deals with both Boyd and Dickie.
- William Gregory Lee as Nick Mooney, one of Napier's deputies.
- Kevin Rankin as Derek "Devil" Lennox, Boyd's henchman who begins to doubt his leadership.
- Stephen Root as Mike Reardon, an eccentric and harsh judge who rules over a case involving Dickie.
- Adam Arkin as Theo Tonin, the head of the Detroit Mob and Quarles's adoptive father.
- Kaitlyn Dever as Loretta McCready, a teenager formerly involved with the Bennetts who is now in foster care.
- Rick Gomez as David Vasquez, an assistant U.S. attorney who begins to believe Raylan is corrupt.
- William Mapother as Delroy Baker, Ellen May's abusive pimp.
- Max Perlich as Sammy Tonin, a Detroit Mob lieutenant and Tonin's pushover son.
- William Ragsdale as Gary Hawkins, Winona's ex-husband who is hiding from Duffy.
- Stephen Tobolowsky as Jerry Barkley, an FBI agent who believes Raylan is corrupt.

=== Guest ===
- Carla Gugino as Karen Goodall (née Sisco), the Assistant Director in the Marshals Service. Reprising her role from the 2003 crime drama television series Karen Sisco, the character's surname was changed as FX did not own the rights to the Karen Sisco character or stories at the time at which the Justified episode in which she guest-starred initially aired.
- Richard Speight Jr. as Jed Berwind, an imprisoned Bennett henchman who Raylan seeks help from.
- Steven Flynn as Emmitt Arnett, a Dixie Mafia higher-up who owes money to the Detroit Mob.
- Linda Gehringer as Helen Givens, Raylan's deceased maternal aunt and stepmother who Arlo imagines talking to.
- James LeGros as Wade Messer, a Harlan petty criminal and drug addict who Raylan is hunting after he sold him out to Dickie in the previous season.

== Production ==
The third season of 13 episodes was announced on March 29, 2011.

=== Filming ===
Episodes were shot in California. The small town of Green Valley, California often doubles for Harlan, Kentucky.

== Episodes ==
| No. overall | No. in season | Title | Directed by | Written by | Original release date | US viewers (millions) |
|---|---|---|---|---|---|---|
| 27 | 1 | "The Gunfighter" | Michael Dinner | Graham Yost & Fred Golan | January 17, 2012 | 3.07 |
Boyd attacks Raylan when he refuses to give him Dickie Bennett for shooting Ava, (Note: As depicted in "Bloody Harlan".) getting him arrested. Devil Lennox (Note: Boyd's associate, first seen in "Fire in the Hole".) refuses Boyd's order to burn Dickie's rotten marijuana because Ava delivers the message. Detroit Mob lieutenant Robert Quarles goes to Frankfort to demand Emmitt Arnett (Note: A Dixie Mafia higher-up, first seen in "Hatless".) repay a loan, so Arnett sends his man Fletcher Nix to rob a local business. Raylan visits Arnett's office after learning Duffy installed the business' security system, where his secretary, on orders from Quarles, misleads him. Raylan finds Nix waiting for him in his hotel room, though he outmaneuvers and shoots him. Quarles kills Arnett and his secretary so he can take over the business.
| 28 | 2 | "Cut Ties" | Michael Watkins | Benjamin Cavell | January 24, 2012 | 2.71 |
Knowing Boyd got himself arrested so he could kill Dickie in prison, Raylan changes his testimony to get Boyd released and has Dickie moved to solitary confinement. Boyd picks a fight to get placed next to him and bribes guard Ash Murphy to get into his cell, where he demands the location of Mags Bennett's remaining money. Dickie explains that it is being held by crime boss Ellstin Limehouse, who will only give it to him. Federal witness Walter Vondas tortures and kills the WITSEC agent who relocated him, planning to sell the locations of the other witnesses he hid. Art is assigned to protect Vondas, who realizes what happened when Vondas's car's GPS puts him at the time and place of the murder. He arrests Vondas as hitmen arrive to kill the witness Rachel is guarding. Art arrives just in time to help her kill them.
| 29 | 3 | "Harlan Roulette" | Jon Avnet | Dave Andron | January 31, 2012 | 2.71 |
Boyd beats Devil for disobeying him about the marijuana, and he begins to doubt Boyd's leadership. Boyd retakes a bar that was previously owned by Johnny Crowder. Murphy, having overheard Dickie talking to Boyd, agrees to help him escape for a cut of Mags's money. Raylan pursues Wade Messer (Note: A petty criminal who sold Raylan out to Dickie, first seen in "Bloody Harlan".) after he steals for Glen Fogle, a sadistic drug supplier who works under Duffy. Messer's accomplice is arrested, so Fogle bails him out and kills him. Raylan suspects Fogle due to how easily he paid bail, so Duffy orders Fogle to kill him. He has Messer lure Raylan to his house, but Raylan sees through the ruse and asks Messer to summon Fogle. He tries to make a deal when Raylan confronts him, enraging his henchman, and they shoot and kill each other. Raylan attacks Duffy for trying to have him killed and drops a bullet on him as a warning. An observing Quarles threatens Raylan, who takes a picture of him before leaving.
| 30 | 4 | "The Devil You Know" | Dean Parisot | Taylor Elmore | February 7, 2012 | 2.21 |
Quarles hires Devil to kill Boyd and take over his operation. Having befriended Dickie, Dewey Crowe jumps into the staged brawl that will get Dickie sent to the infirmary as part of the escape, forcing Murphy and prison doctor Lance to sneak them both out. Raylan hits Murphy with his car while confronting him. Dickie calls Limehouse and asks to pick up the money. Lance's associates accompany him to the dropoff spot, where Limehouse and his lieutenant Errol Butler kill the men. Limehouse reveals to Dickie that Mags spent most of the money. As thanks to Limehouse for saving him, Dickie claims to have killed the men when Raylan arrives, being sent back to prison. Devil seemingly convinces Johnny to help him, only for him to alert Boyd, who kills Devil when confronted.
| 31 | 5 | "Thick as Mud" | Adam Arkin | Story by : Elmore Leonard & Jon Worley; Teleplay by : Jon Worley & Benjamin Cavell | February 14, 2012 | 2.13 |
Limehouse reveals to Errol that he lied to Dickie and kept Mags's money for himself. Winona tells Raylan she loves him but is tired of trying to change him. Desperate for money, Lance pretends to remove Dewey's kidneys and tells him he needs to buy them back. Dewey commits a series of meager robberies and shelters in the back room of a store. Local nurse Layla helps Raylan realize Dewey did not actually have his kidneys removed, and Dewey surrenders when Raylan explains this to him. A hospitalized Murphy dies of a stroke and Raylan realizes Layla was the one monitoring him. Lance sedates him when he goes to her house and plans to harvest his organs, but Layla kills him for slowing them down. Raylan takes Lance's gun and kills her before she can finish him off. Boyd rejects Quarles's offer of partnership. Raylan returns home to find Winona gone, having left a goodbye note.
| 32 | 6 | "When the Guns Come Out" | Don Kurt | Story by : Nichelle Tramble Spellman; Teleplay by : Nichelle Tramble Spellman & Dave Andron | February 21, 2012 | 2.02 |
Quarles's man Tanner Dodd robs Boyd's drug stash house, which is witnessed by prostitute Ellen May. She identifies Tanner when Raylan questions her, but Tanner escapes when confronted. Limehouse deduces that Errol set up the robbery and warns him to ensure Tanner's silence. After learning Raylan sent his photo to the FBI, Quarles kills Brady Hughes, a kidnapped prostitute he has been beating for stress relief. Raylan learns that the money Winona returned (Note: As depicted in "Save My Love".) is missing, and his state trooper friend Tom Bergen tracks her to her sister's house. She denies taking the money and tells Raylan she still loves him, but knows he will not change. Raylan realizes the courthouse's evidence clerk stole the money, who flees to Mexico with it.
| 33 | 7 | "The Man Behind the Curtain" | Peter Werner | Ryan Farley | February 28, 2012 | 2.15 |
Arlo Givens, deteriorating mentally and believing Limehouse is hiding Raylan's deceased mother, tries to kill him and is beaten. Limehouse spares Tanner on the condition that he feeds him information about Quarles. Raylan moves into an apartment above the High Note bar, and Quarles tries to hire him, under the impression that he works for Boyd. Quarles bribes Harlan sheriff Tillman Napier to close Johnny's bar, so Boyd meets with Shelby Parlow (Note: A mining company foreman Boyd used to work with, first seen in "Cottonmouth".) and offers to back him for sheriff in the upcoming election. FBI agent Jerry Barkley comes to Lexington and warns Raylan to stop investigating above his jurisdiction. Raylan tracks down Detroit boss Theo Tonin's son Sammy when he comes to Kentucky, discovering that he hates Quarles. Knowing Sammy will not oppose him, Raylan shuts down several of Quarles's profitable venues. Quarles orders Sammy to implicate Raylan as corrupt, then tracks Gary Hawkins to Tulsa.
| 34 | 8 | "Watching the Detectives" | Peter Werner | Graham Yost | March 6, 2012 | 2.16 |
Barkley overhears Sammy claiming Raylan works for Boyd. Quarles kills Gary on the lawn of his old house with the bullet Raylan threw at Duffy. Barkley and David Vasquez (Note: An assistant U.S. attorney who has previously investigated Raylan's conduct, first seen in "The Lord of War and Thunder".) confront Raylan with corruption accusations, while Quarles and Duffy frame him as unstable when called in for questioning, marking him as a suspect in Gary's murder. Winona finds the gun that killed Gary in his house, which she uses to clear Raylan's name but asks him to not look for her again. Napier and Tanner frame Boyd for a bombing attempt on the former's life, getting him arrested. Theo cuts Quarles out of Detroit due to his repeated failures, so he starts using oxycodone to cope with his stress and agrees to meet with Limehouse.
| 35 | 9 | "Loose Ends" | Gwyneth Horder-Payton | Ingrid Escajeda | March 13, 2012 | 2.26 |
Delroy Baker, Ellen May's pimp, forces his prostitutes to rob a bank, though one is killed and he kills another to ensure his safety. Ellen May escapes and runs to Ava, who kills Delroy when he comes for Ellen May. Errol and Tanner rob the man who sold the latter the bomb, and he tricks Tanner into stepping on an S-mine. Errol kills him before he can disarm it and leaves Tanner to die, so he calls the police for help. He accidentally drops his gun before Raylan can get information about Quarles, triggering the mine and killing him. Boyd attends a sheriff debate after being released, where he sways the crowd to Parlow's side. He allows Ava to take over Audrey's, Delroy's brothel. Raylan sees Errol deliver money to Tanner's mother and realizes he was under Limehouse's employ. He asks Limehouse about Quarles but is turned away.
| 36 | 10 | "Guy Walks into a Bar" | Tony Goldwyn | VJ Boyd | March 20, 2012 | 2.32 |
Napier wins, but because Boyd convinced his sister to take a job with the county, the position is temporarily given to Parlow due to nepotism laws. Raylan learns that Dickie may be released from jail due to lack of evidence for his crimes and fails to get Jed Berwind (Note: An imprisoned Bennett henchman who worked closely with Dickie, first seen in "Debts and Accounts".) to testify. At Dickie's hearing, Raylan falters in his testimony when recounting Helen Givens's murder, (Note: As depicted in "Full Commitment".) giving up and allowing him to be released. Brady's friend Donovan confronts Quarles. He terrifies Donovan with stories of how his father would prostitute him as a boy, and how Theo saved him and helped him kill his father. He tries to duel Raylan at the High Note, but bartender Lindsey Salazar fends him off with a shotgun before she and Raylan have sex. Quarles later strips naked in his hotel room and approaches a restrained Donovan.
| 37 | 11 | "Measures" | John Dahl | Benjamin Cavell | March 27, 2012 | 2.49 |
Theo sends a pair of hitmen to kill Quarles, who raid his room with Duffy to find Donovan tied up in the bathroom. Raylan and Art arrest the hitmen. After his release, Dickie hires drug runner Rodney "Hot Rod" Dunham and his men to get Mags's money back, unaware that Tim and Rachel are pressing Hot Rod to inform on him. Dickie gets the money's location from Ellen May, but Tim and Rachel intervene before he can make a move and confiscate Dickie's portion of Mags's money. Quarles robs and kills a pair of drug dealers in Boyd's employ, but does not get enough money to hide with Limehouse. He arranges a drop with Napier at Audrey's, who gives the location to Boyd when pressed, and Quarles is captured. Dickie convinces Errol to help him get Mags's money, but he asserts that they will need Boyd's help.
| 38 | 12 | "Coalition" | Bill Johnson | Taylor Elmore | April 3, 2012 | 2.46 |
Quarles tricks his guards and escapes. Boyd warily agrees to help Dickie after learning from Errol that Mags's money may be in a Harlan bank. Assuming Quarles will go to Duffy, Boyd instructs him to plant a bomb in Quarles's car. Aware of Boyd's plan, Limehouse tells Quarles to kill him after the robbery, secretly hoping they will kill each other. Arlo hallucinates Helen telling him to attack Ava, which he does before fleeing, and she calls Boyd for help. Dickie incapacitates Johnny and forces Errol to reveal who has Mags's money: Loretta McCready. Raylan is waiting for him at Loretta's, having been tipped by Limehouse, and he shoots Dickie. Quarles goes to Johnny's bar to kill Boyd, only for Duffy to detonate the bomb, which fails to kill Quarles and catches a nearby Bergen's attention. Raylan arrives shortly after to find Bergen dying and Quarles gone, with Johnny claiming Quarles shot Bergen.
| 39 | 13 | "Slaughterhouse" | Dean Parisot | Story by : Graham Yost; Teleplay by : Fred Golan | April 10, 2012 | 2.66 |
Quarles kidnaps a pair of boys and calls Theo, who demands half a million dollars for him to return to Detroit safely but permanently cuts ties with him. Limehouse spares Errol despite his repeated betrayals but warns him to leave Kentucky. Quarles uses the hostages to force Raylan to go with him to Limehouse, where he tries to rob him. Errol ambushes Quarles and they shoot each other, while Limehouse cuts the latter's arm off with a cleaver. As he dies, he reveals that Arlo killed Bergen. Parlow receives an anonymous tip about Devil's murder from Johnny, wanting revenge on Boyd for getting him crippled. (Note: As depicted in "Bulletville".) Boyd and Arlo are arrested, and he tells Arlo he sees him as a father. Arlo confesses to both Bergen and Devil's murders and Boyd is released. Raylan discusses the situation with Winona. As he leaves, he mentions his belief that Arlo, in his delirium, thought Quarles was Boyd and Bergen was Raylan.

== Reception ==
On Rotten Tomatoes, the season has an approval rating of 96% with an average score of 9.6 out of 10 based on 28 reviews. The website's critical consensus reads, "Justified continues to dispense its brand of spare dialogue and sudden violence, culminating in a very satisfying finale." On Metacritic, the season has a weighted average score of 89 out of 100, based on 14 critics, indicating "universal acclaim.

Robert Bianco of USA Today praised this season, writing: "As you'd hope from a show based on Elmore Leonard's work, the plots snap, the dialogue crackles and—to press on with the point—the characters pop." Verne Gay of Newsday said of the third season, "Lean, laconic, precise and as carefully word-crafted as any series on TV, there's pretty much nothing here to suggest that the third season won't be as good as the second -- or better." However, Emily Nussbaum of The New Yorker was critical of the third season, writing: "Extended storytelling has its own conventions and clichés, all of which appeared in Season 3... it echoed every cable drama, in the worst way."

=== Awards ===
Justified received two nominations for the 64th Primetime Emmy Awards, with Jeremy Davies winning for Outstanding Guest Actor in a Drama Series, and a nomination for Outstanding Art Direction for a Single-Camera Series. Fred Golan was nominated for an Edgar Allan Poe Award for Best Episode in a TV Series for "Slaughterhouse".

=== Ratings ===
The third season averaged 2.391 million viewers and a 0.9 rating in the 18–49 demographic.

== Home media release ==
The third season was released on Blu-ray and DVD in region 1 on December 31, 2012, in region 2 on February 25, 2013, and in region 4 on March 6, 2013. Special features on the season three set include nine audio commentaries by cast and crew, deleted scenes, four behind-the-scenes featurettes, and outtakes.
