= Measures (Justified) =

- Justified episode
- Episode no.: Season 3 Episode 11
- Directed by: John Dahl
- Written by: Benjamin Cavell
- Cinematography by: Francis Kenny
- Editing by: Steve Polivka
- Original air date: March 27, 2012
- Running time: 40 minutes

Guest appearances
- Raymond J. Barry as Arlo Givens; Jeremy Davies as Dickie Bennett; Jere Burns as Wynn Duffy; Marshall Allman as Donovan; David Andrews as Sheriff Tillman Napier; Adam Arkin as Theo Tonin; Michael Ironside as Sarno; David Meunier as Johnny Crowder; Demetrius Grosse as Errol; Mickey Jones as Rodney "Hot Rod" Dunham; Jenn Lyon as Lindsey Salazar; Abby Miller as Ellen May; Chris Tardio as Partlow; Clay Wilcox as Longbaugh; Mykelti Williamson as Ellstin Limehouse; Neal McDonough as Robert Quarles

Episode chronology
← Previous "Guy Walks into a Bar"	Next → "Coalition"
- Justified (season 3)

"Measures" is the eleventh episode of the third season of the American Neo-Western television series Justified. It is the 37th overall episode of the series and was written by co-producer Benjamin Cavell and directed by John Dahl. It originally aired on FX on March 27, 2012.

The series is based on Elmore Leonard's stories about the character Raylan Givens, particularly "Fire in the Hole", which serves as the basis for the episode. The series follows Raylan Givens, a tough deputy U.S. Marshal enforcing his own brand of justice. The series revolves around the inhabitants and culture in the Appalachian Mountains area of eastern Kentucky, specifically Harlan County where many of the main characters grew up. In the episode, Quarles goes on a downward spiral as his Detroit boss decides to take matters on his own hands and sends hitmen after him.

According to Nielsen Media Research, the episode was seen by an estimated 2.49 million household viewers and gained a 0.9 ratings share among adults aged 18–49. The episode received very positive reviews from critics, who praised the fast tone, writing, acting and character development.

== Plot ==
While talking with Lindsey (Jenn Lyon) at the bar, Raylan (Timothy Olyphant) is confronted by two men: Sarno (Michael Ironside) and Partlow (Chris Tardio), who confuse him for Quarles (Neal McDonough). Raylan makes a light attack and the men exit the bar when they see Lindsey watching them, as they want no witnesses.

Mullen (Nick Searcy) reprimands Raylan for shooting at the bar's ceiling and due to Quarles' threat, he is forced to accompany him. Dickie (Jeremy Davies) is released from prison and Errol (Demetrius Grosse) meets with him, but Dickie refuses to go with him as he accuses Limehouse (Mykelti Williamson) of holding his mother's money. Unknown to them, Tim (Jacob Pitts) and Rachel (Erica Tazel) are watching them. Returning to his mother's house, Dickie hires a crew to find the money. Meanwhile, Quarles tries to maintain control in his war with Boyd (Walton Goggins) by killing a drug dealer on the Crowder payroll, taking his supplies.

Dickie meets with Ellen May (Abby Miller), despite the fact that she is on Boyd's property. She states that Limehouse hides the money beneath a church and he promises to share the money with her. While he does this, Rachel and Tim confront Dickie's crew at his mother's store. When Dickie discusses the location, the crew abandons him and also let the information pass to Rachel and Tim, who were listening through a microphone and seize the $40,000. Johnny (David Meunier) informs Boyd about the dealer's death and they both confirm from a witness that Quarles is responsible. Boyd then threatens Napier (David Andrews) to reveal Quarles' location. Meanwhile, Sarno and Partlow meet with Duffy (Jere Burns), indicating that Theo Tonin sent them for Quarles. He leads them to his hotel room, where they find Donovan (Marshall Allman) in the bathroom.

Raylan and Mullen catch Sarno in the streets and they are led to Quarles' hotel room to confront the hitmen, Duffy and Donovan. Raylan realizes that Tonin sent the hitmen to kill Quarles, who fled his room. Quarles flees to Noble's Holler, where Limehouse tells him he can lie low as long as he has the money, which Quarles does not. He then calls Napier to meet with him at a brothel, unaware that Boyd is listening to the phone call. While this happens, Duffy calls Tonin (Adam Arkin) in Detroit, as he wants to take over the business when Quarles is dead. Tonin tells him to catch Quarles himself as his hitmen are in custody, offering Duffy $100,000 if he brings him dead and $200,000 if he brings him alive.

Quarles arrives at a trailer with two prostitutes and talks with Duffy, who says that Tonin put a price on him. Just then, Boyd and his henchman show up and taser Quarles. As the prostitutes and his henchman strip Quarles and tie him up, he talks to Duffy, who tells him about the deal but warns him that keeping Quarles alive may prove to be a risk. At the store, Dickie convinces Errol to turn against Limehouse, promising part of the money. Errol accepts to help but states that in order to find the money (which isn't located beneath a church), they will need Boyd.

== Production ==
=== Development ===
In March 2012, it was reported that the eleventh episode of the third season would be titled "Measures", and was to be directed by John Dahl and written by co-producer Benjamin Cavell.

=== Writing ===
The original drafts involved Raylan becoming aware of the hitmen's intentions. Series developer Graham Yost says that star Timothy Olyphant came up with the concept of misdirection. A concern among FX executives was that the audience would deduce the twist before either Raylan and Mullen found out but the writers decided to continue with the idea. Yost said, "the thing is, on our show, Raylan does not have to be perfect. He doesn't have to always be in front of the story, he can sometimes be a little bit behind." The idea was also done to give more screen time to Raylan and Mullen together.

Before the episode aired, Yost previewed Quarles' next move, "he lost. He's in the corner now. Things did not work out the way he planned. Everything was predicated on him having the sheriff in his pocket. Boyd has beaten him. We know he's been cut off by Detroit. His level of desperation has grown, so he's gonna need money."

=== Casting ===
Despite being credited, Natalie Zea does not appear in the episode as her respective character.

In February 2012, it was announced that Adam Arkin would guest star as Theo Tonin, "Quarles' boss and head of the Detroit Mafia." Arkin has been a regular director of the show, a role he would keep doing until the final season.

=== Filming ===
While the episode was the eleventh episode of the season to air, it was actually the twelfth to be produced. Yost said that it was done as it "was farther along in the writing process."

== Reception ==
=== Viewers ===
In its original American broadcast, "Measures" was seen by an estimated 2.49 million household viewers and gained a 0.9 ratings share among adults aged 18–49, according to Nielsen Media Research. This means that 0.9 percent of all households with televisions watched the episode. This was a 7% increase in viewership from the previous episode, which was watched by 2.32 million viewers with a 0.9 in the 18-49 demographics.

=== Critical reviews ===
"Measures" received very positive reviews from critics. Seth Amitin of IGN gave the episode an "amazing" 9 out of 10 and wrote, "We had some excellent characters last year, but a lackluster plot that would've been stronger if it had a stronger foundation from the year before. This year started at ground zero, building on last year's foundation, and brought in new characters fluidly. It enriched itself. As someone once said, beer is great and nachos are great, so when you got beer and nachos, it's a really great thing. Justified has its beer and nachos."

Scott Tobias of The A.V. Club gave the episode a "B+" grade and wrote, "Befitting a season that's poised to barrel through its final two episodes, 'Measures' is mostly about establishing stakes and building anticipation, but it's a testament to how good this season of Justified has been that even its table-setting episodes could be this entertaining." Kevin Fitzpatrick of Screen Crush wrote, "Alright, so a fairly quiet episode by comparison to last week, but someone's got to get all these alliances in place before the really hell erupts from Harlan county. With just about everyone after Quarles, and aligning with their enemy in search of Mags Bennett's money, how will things play out in the next two episodes?"

Alan Sepinwall of HitFix wrote, "'Measures' actually puts even more pieces on the board with the introduction of our two hitmen from Detroit, plus frequent Justified director Adam Arkin as Sammy Tonin's much more impressive father Theo. But beyond that, everyone this week is working a new angle, and trying out a new partner in an attempt to get what they want." Luke de Smet of Slant Magazine wrote, "An episode like 'Measures' seemed inevitable at this point in Justified's third season. Its role is simple: to set up the bloodshed coming in the final two episodes. This isn't a criticism: There may not be much to say about 'Measures' thematically, but the expectation of what's to come creates more than enough tension to prop up the episode. It says perhaps even more about the season as a whole that episodes without clear through lines and ideas have become such a conspicuous rarity."

Ben Lee of Digital Spy wrote, "You won't find me denying that Justified is having a great third season, but 'Measures' - though some of the developments are certainly intriguing - falls slightly short on the usual quality of the show. It's still a decent hour of television, but the storylines in this episode weren't the most thrilling." Joe Reid of Vulture wrote, "I know I did my share of nitpicking about the direction of the Quarles character last week, and while I still don't think we can entirely buy that someone this flaky and unstable could have established such a fearsome reputation in the Detroit mob scene, 'Measures' at least takes the Quarles we know to his logical conclusion: hunted by both Detroit and Boyd Crowder, in a race to see who can take him out first."

Todd VanDerWerff of Los Angeles Times wrote, "I said last week that this season is going to be incredibly dependent on how it ends, and 'Measures' sets the stage for something that could be fantastic." Dan Forcella of TV Fanatic gave the episode a 4.5 star rating out of 5 and wrote, "There have now been 11 installments of Justified's third season, and 'Measures' certainly didn't fail to live up the excitement of the first 10."
