= Karen Sisco =

American crime drama TV series (2003)

- Carla Gugino as Karen Sisco
- Genre: Crime drama
- Based on: Out of Sight by Elmore Leonard
- Developed by: Jason Smilovic
- Starring: Carla Gugino; Robert Forster; Bill Duke
- Composer: Jon Ehrlich
- Country of origin: United States
- Original language: English
- No. of seasons: 1
- No. of episodes: 10

Production
- Executive producers: Danny DeVito; Michael Shamberg; Stacey Sher; John Landgraf; Bob Brush; Michael Dinner
- Camera setup: Single-camera
- Running time: 60 minutes
- Production companies: Jersey Television; Eighty D Productions; Universal Network Television

Original release
- Network: ABC
- Release: October 1, 2003 – April 14, 2004

Karen Sisco is an American crime drama television series starring Carla Gugino in the title role. The series was created by novelist Elmore Leonard, based on a character who had appeared in several of his written works, as well as one film adaptation, 1998's Out of Sight. The series debuted on October 1, 2003 on ABC, and was canceled in November after 7 episodes aired, with the final 3 episodes burned off in late-night during the spring of 2004.

As a U.S. Deputy Marshal, based on Miami, Florida's Gold Coast, Karen must deal with the underbelly of South Beach nightlife and Palm Beach high life while tracking down fugitives. She also struggles to win the respect of her fellow officers. Karen occasionally gets advice from her father, a retired Miami police officer turned private investigator, who is Karen’s confidant, counselor, and confessor. The show ran in the same time slot as the 14th season of NBC's Law & Order, drawing less than half the audience during its opening weeks, losing audience until it drew less than one third the viewership of Law & Order before it was cancelled.

In 2012, Gugino reprised her role, now as an Assistant Director with the Marshals Service, in a third season episode of Justified. In 2013, TV Guide included the series in its list of 60 shows that were "Canceled Too Soon".

== Character history ==
Prior to the events of the series, the character appeared in two stories:

- "Karen Makes Out", a 1996 short story, available in two collections: Murder for Love, and When the Women Come Out to Dance, and Other Stories
- Out of Sight, a 1996 novel, and 1998 film wherein she was played by Jennifer Lopez, and Marshall Sisco was played by Dennis Farina.

== Cast ==
- Carla Gugino as Karen Sisco
- Robert Forster as Marshall Sisco, Karen's father
- Bill Duke as Amos Andrews, Karen's boss

=== Recurring ===
- Jeffrey De Serrano as Edwards
- Frank Pesce as Sonny
- Robert Deacon as Mordecai Jones
- Obba Babatundé as Daniel Burden
- Jake Mailey as Jethro

== Production ==
Jason Smilovic and Peter Lefcourt were co-executive producers and writers, with Smilovic having developed the series. Scott Frank, nominated for an Oscar for Best Adapted Screenplay for Out of Sight, served as an executive consultant.

== Episodes ==
No.	Title	Directed by	Written by	Original release date	Prod. code	Viewers (millions)
1	"Blown Away"	Michael Dinner	Story by : Elmore Leonard; Teleplay by : Bob Brush	October 1, 2003	E4701	9.13
2	"Dumb Bunnies"	Jeremy Kagan	John Mankiewicz	October 8, 2003	E4703	8.03
3	"The One That Got Away"	Michael Dinner	Jason Smilovic	October 15, 2003	EP016	7.86
4	"Justice"	John David Coles	Story by : Charles H. Eglee; Teleplay by : Robert Palm	October 22, 2003	E4704	7.06
5	"Nostalgia"	Steve Miner	Jason Smilovic	October 29, 2003	E4702	7.68
6	"Dear Derwood"	Charles Haid	Story by : Bob Brush; Teleplay by : Peter Lefcourt & Jason Smilovic	November 5, 2003	E4706	6.62
7	"Nobody's Perfect"	Michael Katleman	Peter Lefcourt	November 12, 2003	E4707	6.70
8	"Dog Day Sisco"	Rick Wallace	Sebastian Gutierrez	March 31, 2004	E4709	NA (Note: Not applicable, burned off during the late-night television block, no prime time viewership.)
9	"No One's Girl"	David Carson	John Landgraf	April 7, 2004	E4710	NA
10	"He Was a Friend of Mine"	Kathryn Bigelow	Peter Lefcourt	April 14, 2004	E4708	NA

== Connections to other media ==
Gugino appeared as "Karen Goodall" in the second episode of the third season of Justified, which is also based on a work by Leonard. There, the character had been promoted to Assistant Director in the Marshals Service, and had married and divorced, taking and keeping the last name Goodall. This name change was necessary as FX did not own the rights to the Karen Sisco character, or her stories.
