= Thick as Mud =

- Justified episode
- Episode no.: Season 3 Episode 5
- Directed by: Adam Arkin
- Story by: Elmore Leonard & Jon Worley
- Teleplay by: Jon Worley & Benjamin Cavell
- Cinematography by: Francis Kenny
- Editing by: Keith Henderson
- Original air date: February 14, 2012
- Running time: 40 minutes

Guest appearances
- Raymond J. Barry as Arlo Givens; Clayne Crawford as Lance; Demetrius Grosse as Errol; Damon Herriman as Dewey Crowe; Maggie Lawson as Layla; David Meunier as Johnny Crowder; Todd Stashwick as Ash Murphy; Mykelti Williamson as Ellstin Limehouse; Neal McDonough as Robert Quarles

Episode chronology
← Previous "The Devil You Know"	Next → "When the Guns Come Out"
- Justified (season 3)

"Thick as Mud" is the fifth episode of the third season of the American Neo-Western television series Justified. It is the 31st overall episode of the series and was written by story editor Jon Worley and co-producer Benjamin Cavell from a story by Worley and executive producer Elmore Leonard and directed by Adam Arkin. It originally aired on FX on February 14, 2012.

The series is based on Elmore Leonard's stories about the character Raylan Givens, particularly "Fire in the Hole", which serves as the basis for the episode. The series follows Raylan Givens, a tough deputy U.S. Marshal enforcing his own brand of justice. The series revolves around the inhabitants and culture in the Appalachian Mountains area of eastern Kentucky, specifically Harlan County where many of the main characters grew up. In the episode, Dewey finds himself in an extremely dangerous position when Lance "removes" his kidneys and must get money in a short span to get them back. Despite being credited, Jacob Pitts does not appear in the episode.

According to Nielsen Media Research, the episode was seen by an estimated 2.13 million household viewers and gained a 0.8 ratings share among adults aged 18–49. The episode received critical acclaim, who praised the pace, writing, character development, shock value and performances, with the majority highlighting Damon Herriman as Dewey Crowe.

== Plot ==
Limehouse (Mykelti Williamson) reveals to one of his crew members that he lied to Dickie, and he actually has the $3 million that Mags left him. Somewhere else, Boyd (Walton Goggins) and Arlo (Raymond J. Barry) bury Devil's corpse in the woods. Raylan (Timothy Olyphant) talks with Winona (Natalie Zea) at her house, where she says she is tired of trying to change Raylan's personality. In his hotel room, Lance (Clayne Crawford) wakes up Dewey (Damon Herriman) in the bathtub, showing he has removed his kidneys. Lance tells a horrified Dewey that he has a few hours to get $20,000 to buy his kidneys back before he sells them to another bidder and before Dewey dies.

Raylan and Rachel (Erica Tazel) reach Lance's room but find that both Lance and Dewey already left. Dewey, desperate for money, robs an appliance store, a strip club and a dry cleaner, but none of them have anywhere close to the $20,000 needed. Raylan and Rachel all inspect Dewey's robberies and are told by the strippers about Dewey's scars. Raylan visits a wounded Ash (Todd Stashwick) in the hospital, forcing him to reveal that Lance is involved in Dewey's position. He then asks a nurse named Layla (Maggie Lawson) about doctors focused on organ removing, and she directs him to a doctor named Boisineau.

Boyd continues expanding his business, although he expresses doubts to Ava (Joelle Carter) about having to kill Devil. He later attacks an associate of Quarles and steal his Oxy supplies. Dewey attempts to rob a grocery store but the owner hits him with a shotgun, forcing Dewey to hide in the storage room. Raylan arrives and calms Dewey, telling him to urinate, as he needs his kidneys to do it. Dewey tries it and is overjoyed to see he can urinate and is taken to the hospital. Rachel tells Raylan that Ash suddenly died in the hospital and he was the only visitor during the day. Suspecting Layla, Raylan visits her at her house where she admits being involved in a transplant center. Lance appears and sedates Raylan with a needle.

Lance takes Raylan to a bathtub, intending to remove his organs. But Layla shoots Lance just as Raylan awakens. Before she can kill Raylan, Raylan shoots her through Lance's corpse. Ambulances arrive and take Layla away, leaving her survival uncertain. Quarles (Neal McDonough) meets with Boyd, offering a partnership. However, Boyd declines the offer, referring to Quarles as a "Carpetbagger". Quarles is offended by the remark and leaves. Limehouse is revealed to have a woman on his payroll who has a connection to one of Quarles' underlings, reporting Quarles' and Boyd's meeting. The episode ends with Raylan returning to Winona's (Natalie Zea) house and finds a note. He is clearly unsettled by the note.

== Production ==
=== Development ===
In January 2012, it was reported that the fifth episode of the third season would be titled "Thick as Mud", and was to be directed by Adam Arkin and written by story editor Jon Worley and co-producer Benjamin Cavell from a story by Worley and executive producer Elmore Leonard.

=== Writing ===
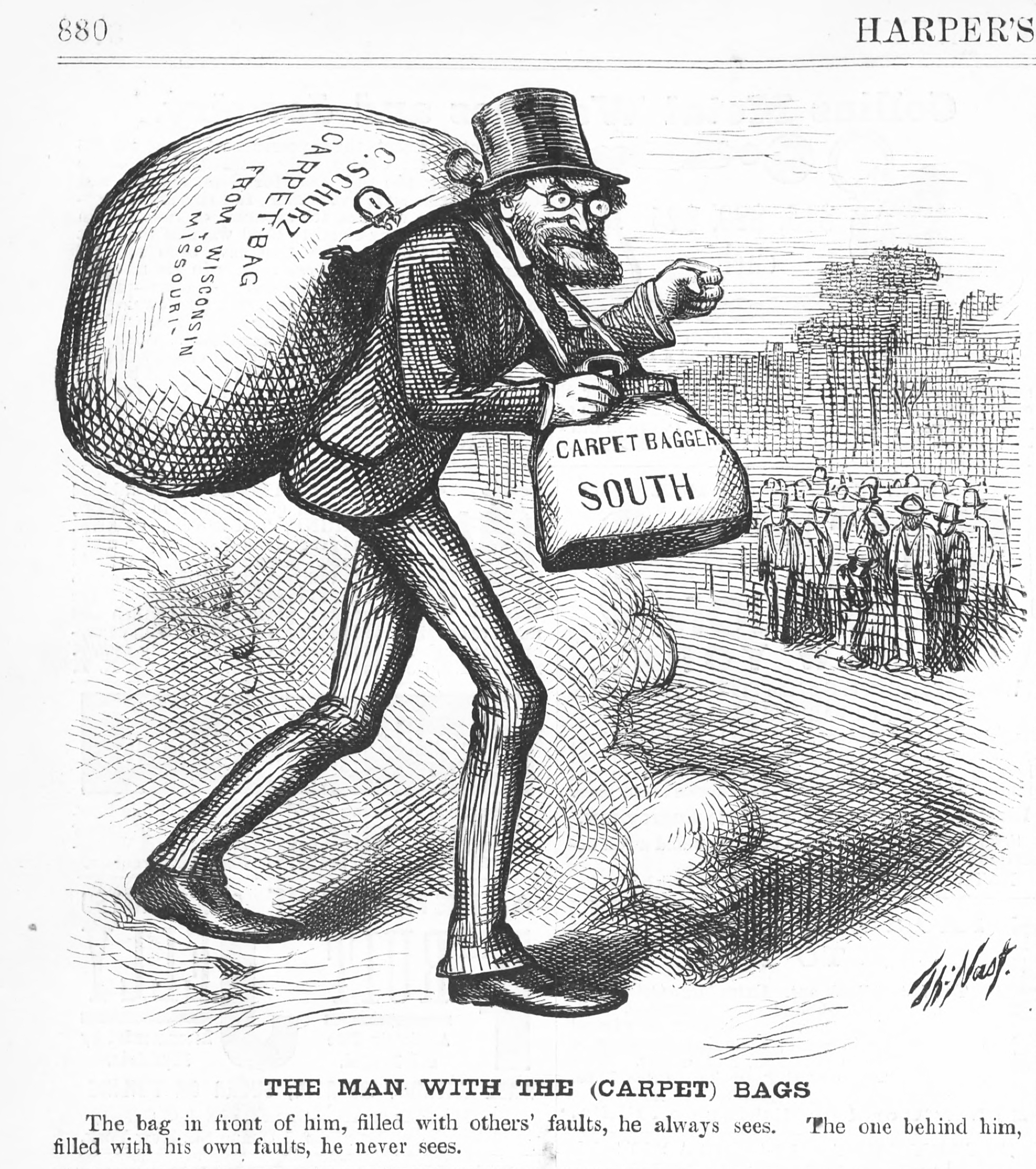
Boyd refers to Quarles as a "Carpetbagger" in the episode. Series developer Graham Yost previously explained the meaning behind the comment, noting similarities between the characters.

The writers teased more material that would explore the search for Mags Bennett's money in the episode. Series developer Graham Yost explained that Dewey was supposed to die in the first episode but the network told him to change plans, "the uproar was such that it was loud and clear that Dewey must not die until Dewey absolutely has to die." He eventually was grateful for the choice, as it allowed the writers to develop more stories of him. The episode's plotline involving Dewey was based on Elmore Leonard's 2012 novel Raylan although the writers changed some aspects, such as Dewey keeping his kidneys. Raylan's scene in the bathtub was adapted from the novel. Yost teased the episode, deeming it a "Dewey-centric" episode.

Boyd referred to Quarles as a "Carpetbagger", a derogatory term applied by Southerners to opportunistic Northerners who came to the Southern states after the American Civil War, who were perceived to be exploiting the local populace for their own financial, political, and/or social gain. Yost previously referred to the character in a previous interview, further elaborating, "there's a line in there something about a man from the Northeast comes waving $100 bills — it's just that idea of people coming to Harlan to exploit it for its natural resources and then gettin' the money and getting out. First it was timber, then it was coal. In our twisted Justified world, the natural resource down there is Oxy addicts. We just thought that becomes an Elmore-like scam. Elmore's bad guys are always looking for that little gap, that little thing that no one else has tried, that makes some kind of sense."

Yost also explained the meaning behind Winona's letter, "as much as we love Raylan, I think that Winona reminds us that being married to someone like that would have incredible costs. So it's difficult to, at times, like the character who's saying about your hero 'You shouldn't be doing this', because we want him to keep on doing it, because that's the reason we tune in every week. But we wanted to make sure that her point of view was clear and it had nothing to do with her love for him."

When questioned about why Dewey still had his kidneys and what was Lance's and Layla's plan, Yost clarified, "the rationale was that no one who'd actually had their kidneys taken out could go rob people and get more money. Lance figured Dewey was an idiot (not a reach, Dewey being Dewey) who wouldn't know better. He'd go out, get some more cash, and when he came to deliver it, then they'd take 'em out, kill him."

=== Casting ===
A few days before the airing of the episode, Maggie Lawson was announced to be guest starring in the show as "a nurse who might have vital information to share with Raylan." Yost and executive producer Fred Golan were big fans of Psych, which stars Lawson. Yost says that when he saw her audition reel, he said, "well, let's get Maggie."

== Reception ==
=== Viewers ===
In its original American broadcast, "Thick as Mud" was seen by an estimated 2.13 million household viewers and gained a 0.8 ratings share among adults aged 18–49, according to Nielsen Media Research. This means that 0.8 percent of all households with televisions watched the episode. This was a 4% decrease in viewership from the previous episode, which was watched by 2.21 million viewers with a 0.9 in the 18-49 demographics.

=== Critical reviews ===
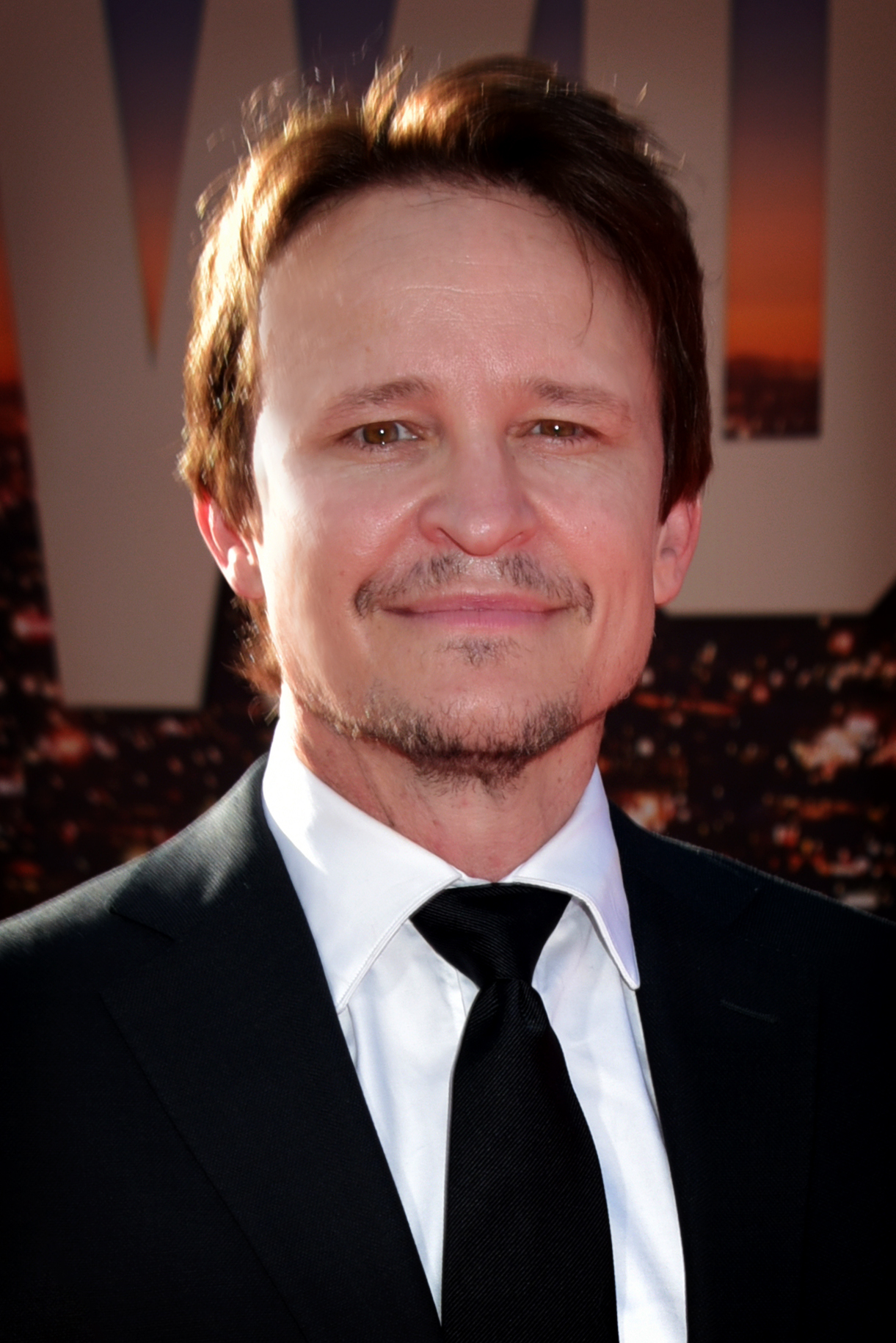
Damon Herriman's performance in the episode received universal acclaim from critics.

"Thick as Mud" received critical acclaim. Seth Amitin of IGN gave the episode an "amazing" 9 out of 10 and wrote, "The episode is book-ended with Raylan and Winona 'conversations'. Winona said she was done trying to change him which, to most people, would be a pretty big shock given that Raylan shoots a person per episode and she's about to give birth to their child. It ends with a note in the kitchen and her gone. We can assume she left, but we'll have to wait for the why. Another good driving force for what's been a pretty good got dang season so far."

Scott Tobias of The A.V. Club gave the episode an "A" grade and wrote, "This will likely mean more episodes like the stellar 'Thick As Mud', which has the luxury of zeroing in on the misadventures of Dewey Crowe while exerting less energy keeping other balls in the air. The result is the best hour of the season — tight, suspenseful, hilarious, and a great showcase for a peripheral character who finally gets his time in the spotlight."

Alan Sepinwall of HitFix wrote, "But every other part of the Dewey story was wonderful, and another example of the benefits the show is now reaping of the deep bench that’s been assembled. Telling this kind of story about an escaped con we had met at the start of the episode wouldn't have had remotely the impact as we got from watching Dewey Crowe be put through this terrifying ordeal." Luke de Smet of Slant Magazine wrote, "'Thick As Mud' is a spectacular episode, with some of the best writing and dialogue Justified has given us, and it wasn't a surprise to see that it was penned by none other than Elmore Leonard."

Ben Lee of Digital Spy wrote, "It was pretty grim seeing the incisions and hearing Lance talk in graphic detail about what happens if you had no kidneys, but it totally worked in making me want to see Dewey survive even more." Joe Reid of Vulture wrote, "Now THIS is the balance between intertwined criminal wheelings and dealings and Raylan Givens being charmingly badass that I've been looking for. And for an episode that is this much about organ harvesting, it was one of the funniest, most just-plain-entertaining episodes of Justified that I can remember."

Todd VanDerWerff of Los Angeles Times wrote, "'Thick As Mud' is Justified at its finest, as it takes one of the show's many, many tertiary characters and follows him around on the worst day of his life." Dan Forcella of TV Fanatic gave the episode a 4 star rating out of 5 and wrote, "'Thick As Mud' was another great episode in Justified's thrilling third season." Jack McKinney of Paste gave the episode a 8 rating out of 10 and wrote, "The two important emotional beats from tonight were both Winona-centric. Her admission to Raylan that she has given up both trying to change him and trying to find anyone else that she could love like she loves him is a beautiful moment and on its surface seems more maudlin than Justified usually gets."
