= The Man Behind the Curtain (Justified) =

- Justified episode
- Episode no.: Season 3 Episode 7
- Directed by: Peter Werner
- Written by: Ryan Farley
- Cinematography by: Francis Kenny
- Editing by: Bill Johnson
- Original air date: February 28, 2012
- Running time: 38 minutes

Guest appearances
- Raymond J. Barry as Arlo Givens; Jere Burns as Wynn Duffy; David Andrews as Sheriff Tillman Napier; Jim Beaver as Shelby Parlow; David Meunier as Johnny Crowder; Max Perlich as Sammy Tonin; William Ragsdale as Gary Hawkins; Stephen Tobolowsky as FBI Agent Jerry Barkley; Demetrius Grosse as Errol; Jenn Lyon as Lindsey Salazar; Cleavon R. McClendon III as Bernard; Mykelti Williamson as Ellstin Limehouse; Neal McDonough as Robert Quarles

Episode chronology
← Previous "When the Guns Come Out"	Next → "Watching the Detectives"
- Justified (season 3)

"The Man Behind the Curtain" is the seventh episode of the third season of the American Neo-Western television series Justified. It is the 33rd overall episode of the series and was written by story editor Ryan Farley and directed by Peter Werner. It originally aired on FX on February 28, 2012.

The series is based on Elmore Leonard's stories about the character Raylan Givens, particularly "Fire in the Hole", which serves as the basis for the episode. The series follows Raylan Givens, a tough deputy U.S. Marshal enforcing his own brand of justice. The series revolves around the inhabitants and culture in the Appalachian Mountains area of eastern Kentucky, specifically Harlan County where many of the main characters grew up. In the episode, Raylan continues investigating Quarles, although this may prove to be risky for him and Tim.

According to Nielsen Media Research, the episode was seen by an estimated 2.15 million household viewers and gained a 0.9 ratings share among adults aged 18–49. The episode received generally positive reviews from critics, who praised the build-up for the second half of the season and performances, although some expressed dissatisfaction with the episode's pace.

== Plot ==
A disoriented Arlo (Raymond J. Barry) walks through a road in the middle of the night, only to be stopped by men working for Limehouse (Mykelti Williamson). At Limehouse's Holler, a wounded Tanner shows up, begging for forgiveness for letting Raylan get involved. Limehouse forgives him and lets Tanner lick his wounds, only if he agrees to provide information on Quarles' movements. Limehouse later confronts Arlo, who accuses him of having his deceased wife Frances on Limehouse's Holler. When Arlo reaches for his gun, Limehouse's men knock him unconscious.

Raylan (Timothy Olyphant) has moved up to a new hotel located above a bar, which prevents him from sleeping well. He goes to the bar and meets with Quarles (Neal McDonough), who wants to make him an offer of partnership. Quarles thinks Raylan works for Boyd (Walton Goggins) and Raylan just declines his offer. Raylan later asks Tim (Jacob Pitts) to get help from his FBI contacts to get more information on Quarles. Quarles then discusses with Duffy (Jere Burns) about a new possible partnership as his boss Theo Tonin's son, Sammy (Max Perlich), will soon arrive. He decides to bribe Harlan County Sheriff Tillman Napier (David Andrews) to help with his business.

Raylan attacks Boyd at his bar, assuming he told Quarles that he was on his payroll but Boyd states he never told him that. Napier later visits Boyd and, under Quarles' influence, closes down his bar for failing to meet regulations. Boyd then asks Limehouse for help in dealing with Napier. Raylan tries to investigate more about Sammy but FBI agents stop him and take him to the office. Agent Jerry Barkley (Stephen Tobolowsky) interrogates Raylan and Tim for investigating beyond their jurisdiction, warning them to stay away from it. Raylan ignores the warning and finds Sammy at a horsetrack, but realizes that he does not enjoy working with him.

With this blessing, Raylan meets with Quarles and tells him that he used a judge to shut down Quarles' developing underground clinic for working near a school, angering Quarles. Duffy also tells Quarles that all money transfers from Sammy have been cancelled and they deduce Raylan was involved. Quarles meets with Sammy, telling him to make sure the FBI listens to him saying that Raylan works for Boyd. Boyd, meanwhile, has met with his former boss, Shelby Parlow (Jim Beaver) and suggests he runs for Sheriff in the elections.

In Tulsa, Oklahoma, Gary (William Ragsdale) is revealed to be working as a motivational speaker. Quarles (unknown to Gary) suddenly appears at one of his talks and invites him for a drink at a bar. Gary is then shocked when he sees Quarles' associate and Duffy show up next to them.

== Production ==
=== Development ===
In February 2012, it was reported that the seventh episode of the third season would be titled "The Man Behind the Curtain", and was to be directed by Peter Werner and written by story editor Ryan Farley.

=== Writing ===
Series developer Graham Yost teased that Raylan's and Boyd's relationship would play a pivotal role on the episode. Raylan's new home was adapted from Elmore Leonard's 2012 novel Raylan, with Yost commenting "he had Raylan living above a college bar and doing bouncer work but not really being a bouncer. It's more that it's nice to have a marshal living above the bar." The choice was also done in order to make shooting in the office easier as it took many days to film scenes there; Yost also said, "part of it is we need a place for Raylan to be where he can talk to people. That was one of the limiting things, frankly, about the motel. You're not gonna hang out in the motel. So this gives us a little more freedom to do bigger scenes with more people."

When Quarles realizes that Sammy Tonin will arrive at their town, the character says, "I'm just gonna put a smile on my face and eat a nice plate of steaming shit unsalted." The line was inspired by a story involving Yost's father, Elwy Yost, while working on Saturday Night at the Movies. After conducting an interview with Richard Brooks, Brooks told Elwy Yost that the hardest thing about working in the film business "it's all this shit you have to eat unsalted."

=== Casting ===
Despite being credited, Erica Tazel and Natalie Zea do not appear in the episode as their respective characters.

In December 2011, Jim Beaver confirmed that he would return to reprise his role as Shelby Parlow on a multi-episode run for the season. The episode also introduced Jenn Lyon as Lindsey Salazar, with Yost teasing that a new woman would enter Raylan's life.

=== Filming ===
The episode was filmed back-to-back with the follow-up episode, "Watching the Detectives", in order to save time for filming. Yost said, "we knew that 308, and 307 to a certain extent, needed to have a lot of Marshals office stuff."

== Reception ==
=== Viewers ===
In its original American broadcast, "The Man Behind the Curtain" was seen by an estimated 2.15 million household viewers and gained a 0.9 ratings share among adults aged 18–49, according to Nielsen Media Research. This means that 0.9 percent of all households with televisions watched the episode. This was a 6% increase in viewership from the previous episode, which was watched by 2.02 million viewers with a 0.8 in the 18-49 demographics.

=== Critical reviews ===
"The Man Behind the Curtain" received generally positive reviews from critics. Seth Amitin of IGN gave the episode a "good" 7.5 out of 10 and wrote, "The writing is certainly solid and the acting is far above the average show. There was a time when action movies used to be like this, where the criminals were gruff but clever, the bad guys smart and fox-like and the plot unfolded before us. While action movies haven't quite matched the Total Recall or Die Hard era, action/thriller television shows have taken their place. It's amazing. Justified is definitely earning its place among those shows."

Scott Tobias of The A.V. Club gave the episode a "B+" grade and wrote, "As with too many episodes of Justified this season, 'The Man Behind The Curtain' is more concerned with moving the pieces around the board for what should be a thrilling endgame than in delivering an hour with its own satisfying, self-contained arc. But few shows move pieces as entertainingly as Justified." Kevin Fitzpatrick of Screen Crush wrote, "Boy, that Gary's fate is dare I say... Justified! Few thought the gun-slinging series would ever be able to top last season's Mags Bennett as a villain, but so far the combined threat of Neal McDonough, Mykelti Williamson, and this unseen Detroit mob boss have all of Harlan county running for their hills! And with Raylan running increasingly off the rails without Winona, how will the second half of the third season finish out without at least a few body bags?"

Alan Sepinwall of HitFix wrote, "'The Man Behind the Curtain' was the midpoint of season 3, and as such, it perhaps shouldn't be surprising that it didn't bother with any standalone stories. Instead, it moved a lot of chess pieces around the board for the season's second half. Those are necessary sometimes, particularly with as many villains and storylines we have this season, and it helped that the hour also told us so much about our well-dressed new friend from Detroit." Luke de Smet of Slant Magazine wrote, "For two episodes with very little action, 'The Man Behind the Curtain' and 'Watching the Detectives' wind up revealing quite a bit about Justified's representation of violence."

Ben Lee of Digital Spy wrote, "The third season of Justified has been undoubtedly strong, but 'The Man Behind the Curtain' takes a step back from the usual excellent villains-of-the-week to focus on Quarles. The end result is another good episode of FX's critically acclaimed drama, but one that is more transitional in nature and as a consequence, perhaps lacks a satisfying payoff at the end - despite the return of Gary in the final few minutes." Joe Reid of Vulture wrote, "Does Raylan Givens look like a dirty cop to you? I don't even know how I'd quantify the appearance of a lawman who's on the take, but certainly you took one look at Sheriff Napier tonight and you knew he was just waiting to be bought."

Todd VanDerWerff of Los Angeles Times wrote, "'Curtain' is an episode that mostly exists to make sure all of the pieces are at the right place on the show's board as the season hits its midpoint, but it's a remarkably assured version of that sort of episode. It's easy to make these sorts of episodes feel mechanical, like the writers are pushing the characters around, rather than letting the characters do their own walking. But 'Curtain' is vivid and funny and shot through with great scenes just dripping with conflict. Something big is coming to Harlan, and I'm not sure everybody's going to have what it takes to survive it." Dan Forcella of TV Fanatic gave the episode a 3.5 star rating out of 5 and wrote, "So there were a lot of moving pieces during 'The Man Behind the Curtain', and there was certainly a healthy amount of new information on Robert Quarles, but was this one of your favorite episodes of the season? It wasn't mine, but maybe I'm just as crazy as Arlo Givens when he's off of his meds." Jack McKinney of Paste gave the episode a 8.5 rating out of 10 and wrote, "Somebody should have warned Quarles before he came down to Harlan County and started stirring up trouble. There are certain rules and regulations to dealing with folks in Appalachia, but there's only one that you really need to remember. Never make things personal. It seems that from here on out, everything on Justified is going to be personal."
