= The Devil You Know (Justified) =

- Justified episode
- Episode no.: Season 3 Episode 4
- Directed by: Dean Parisot
- Written by: Taylor Elmore
- Cinematography by: Francis Kenny
- Editing by: Bill Johnson
- Original air date: February 7, 2012
- Running time: 41 minutes

Guest appearances
- Mykelti Williamson as Ellstin Limehouse; Jeremy Davies as Dickie Bennett; Adam Bartley as Junior; Ed Corbin as Combs; Clayne Crawford as Lance; Kaitlyn Dever as Loretta McCready; Demetrius Grosse as Errol; Damon Herriman as Dewey Crowe; David Meunier as Johnny Crowder; Kevin Rankin as Derek "Devil" Lennox; Todd Stashwick as Ash Murphy; Neal McDonough as Robert Quarles

Episode chronology
← Previous "Harlan Roulette"	Next → "Thick as Mud"
- Justified (season 3)

"The Devil You Know" is the fourth episode of the third season of the American Neo-Western television series Justified. It is the 30th overall episode of the series and was written by producer Taylor Elmore and directed by Dean Parisot. It originally aired on FX on February 7, 2012.

The series is based on Elmore Leonard's stories about the character Raylan Givens, particularly "Fire in the Hole", which serves as the basis for the episode. The series follows Raylan Givens, a tough deputy U.S. Marshal enforcing his own brand of justice. The series revolves around the inhabitants and culture in the Appalachian Mountains area of eastern Kentucky, specifically Harlan County where many of the main characters grew up. In the episode, Dickie and Dewey are broken out of prison by two corrupt staff members in order to find Mags' money. Despite being credited, Nick Searcy, Joelle Carter, Jacob Pitts and Natalie Zea do not appear in the episode.

According to Nielsen Media Research, the episode was seen by an estimated 2.21 million household viewers and gained a 0.9 ratings share among adults aged 18–49. The episode received very positive reviews from critics, who praised the pace, writing, performances and ending, with many highlighting Walton Goggins' and Kevin Rankin's performances as standouts.

== Plot ==
Devil (Kevin Rankin) meets with Quarles (Neal McDonough) at his house, who offers him an opportunity to work for him. At prison, Dickie (Jeremy Davies) and Dewey (Damon Herriman) are brutally attacked by inmates until Ash (Todd Stashwick) takes them to the infirmary. Due to Dewey's knowledge of their plan, Ash and doctor Lance (Clayne Crawford) are forced to take him out of prison as well. Lance later falsely testifies with Raylan (Timothy Olyphant), saying that Dickie escaped on his own and attacked him.

Raylan visits Loretta (Kaitlyn Dever), who now works as a babysitter although she is still involved in the drug business. Raylan asks about Mags' money and Loretta gives him a possible lead. Raylan and Rachel (Erica Tazel) question Limehouse (Mykelti Williamson), who avoids their questions but invites them to a barbecue that same night. This is seen by Dickie and Ash, who return to a hotel with Lance and Dewey. As approaching Limehouse in person is a huge risk, Dickie contacts him through the phone to ask for the money. Ash goes out for food and when he returns, he finds Raylan watching him. When he tries to reach for his weapon, Raylan runs over him with his car twice. He enters the hotel room but finds that everyone already escaped.

Devil starts questioning Boyd's (Walton Goggins) leadership as he believes they are not making any progress in their business, he starts considering Quarles' deal. He shares his frustrations with Johnny (David Meunier), reminding him that he is unable to walk because of Boyd and tells him about the deal with Quarles. Finding about Dickie's deal with Limehouse, Raylan has Rachel check on possible trucks leaving the area. She stops a truck belonging to Limehouse that claims to be pig manure and the truck is forced to return. Both Raylan and Rachel question if the truck had the money. However, Raylan realizes that Dickie will be killed if the money does not arrive.

Dickie leads two crew members, Combs (Ed Corbin) and Junior (Adam Bartley), to Mags' old store to get the money from a cooler. Just then, Limehouse arrives and kills Combs and Junior, saving Dickie's life. However, Dickie is disappointed to see that the money in the cooler is all the money he was left with, and instead of $3 million as he thought, is just $46,000 as Mags spent the rest on buying the properties. Dickie hands the money over to Limehouse, asking just for his shotgun, which he agrees to give to Dickie. After they leave, Raylan appears in the store after hearing gunshots. Dickie claims to have killed Combs and Junior and surrenders himself.

Knowing about Dickie's arrest, Lance sedates Dewey in their hotel room and calls an associate to tell him he may found a new way to make money. At Johnny's bar, Devil and Johnny join Boyd for a talk. Devil confronts Boyd with a gun, telling him about his deal with Quarles. However, Johnny already talked with Boyd and both point their guns at Devil. Boyd shoots Devil in the chest, making him fall to the ground. As Devil bleeds, Boyd expresses disappointment at him for failing to prove his loyalty and executes him by shooting him in the head.

== Production ==
=== Development ===
In January 2012, it was reported that the fourth episode of the third season would be titled "The Devil You Know", and was to be directed by Dean Parisot and written by producer Taylor Elmore.

=== Writing ===
The writers teased more material that would explore the search for Mags Bennett's money in the episode. Devil's death was written into the episode as actor Kevin Rankin signed as series regulars on a new series, Unforgettable and Rankin agreed to star in 3 or 4 episodes of the season. Despite that, series developer Graham Yost viewed it as an opportunity, "to show Boyd crossing a line, killing an old friend, an old colleague because he betrayed him. He just couldn't tolerate that, couldn't risk it." Rankin commented on his character's death, "everyone involved [with Justified] is so on the same frequency, that I think that we all understood the poetic justice of Boyd taking Devil out."

Originally, Raylan was set to shoot Ash Murphy when he spots him and Ash Murphy fails to draw his gun in time. Timothy Olyphant suggested the idea of running over the character instead of shooting, which the writers accepted. They also decided to repeat the stunt for comedic purposes.

== Reception ==
=== Viewers ===
In its original American broadcast, "The Devil You Know" was seen by an estimated 2.21 million household viewers and gained a 0.9 ratings share among adults aged 18–49, according to Nielsen Media Research. This means that 0.9 percent of all households with televisions watched the episode. This was a 19% decrease in viewership from the previous episode, which was watched by 2.71 million viewers with a 1.1 in the 18-49 demographics.

=== Critical reviews ===
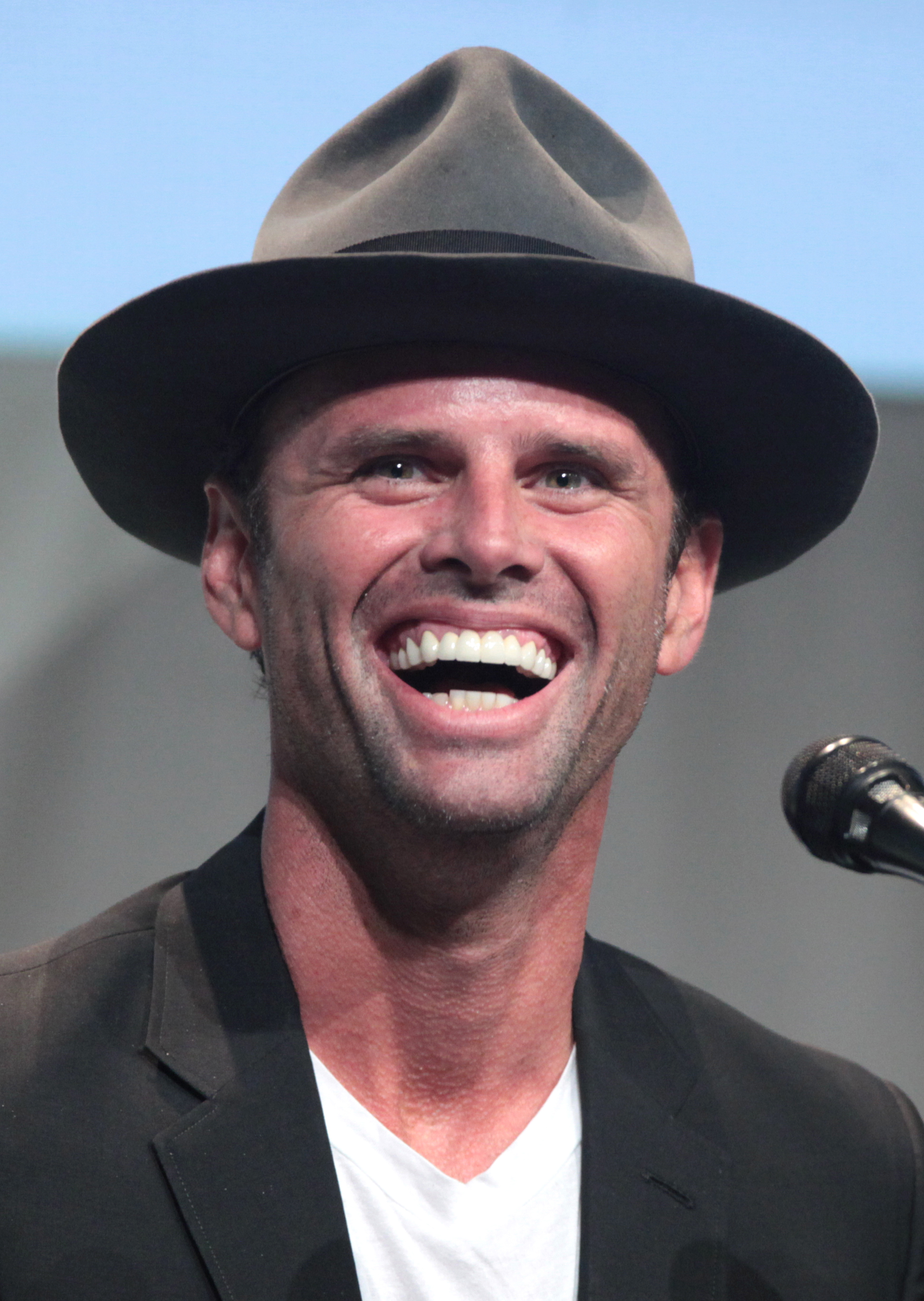
Walton Goggins's performance in the episode received critical acclaim.

"The Devil You Know" received very positive reviews from critics. Seth Amitin of IGN gave the episode a "great" 8.5 out of 10 and wrote, "The whole strategy of the season was laid out before us in this one. Boyd and Quarles are now connected. The Marshals now have someone to look for that'll get them involved in this. These minor transitions are nuanced in a weekly 'Who's Missing' game and I think that's the most impressive part of it. Season 3 is looking strong as ever."

Scott Tobias of The A.V. Club gave the episode a "B+" grade and wrote, "As we get deeper into Season Three, 'The Devil You Know' emphasizes the venality of the bad elements that have seeped into Harlan in the wake of Mags' death. Alliances are temporary, and forged only through the pursuit of like interests. Outside of that, it's anyone's ballgame."

Alan Sepinwall of HitFix wrote, "'The Devil You Know' was pleasurable in a lot of ways, as the season's various moving pieces started bumping up against each other, as we said goodbye to a notable supporting character, and as Raylan found himself once again reluctantly saving Dickie from the many people who mean him harm." Luke de Smet of Slant Magazine wrote, "A lot of talk regarding season three of Justified has centered around whether the show could successfully replace Mags Bennett. The writers have cleverly embraced the gap Mags left behind; instead of trying to replace her directly, they've used her absence to create the sense of a town on the precipice of a crime war. Many different players are eager to fill the role of Harlan's chief villain. This week's episode, however, reminds us that Mags was never truly the chief villain of Justified to begin with."

Ben Lee of Digital Spy wrote, "It's unclear at this stage how, if ever, the two new major shady characters will cross paths, but for now, both Neal McDonough and Mykelti Williamson are doing fabulous jobs embodying them." Joe Reid of Vulture wrote, "Last week, I was struck by the great scramble at the top of the Harlan criminal food chain, and this week's episode deals with a consolidation of that power. But it doesn't involve Raylan a whole hell of a lot, at least not beyond the semi-perfunctory role of the guy who steps in to wrap everything up. I have every confidence that Graham Yost has this situation well in hand, but it's tough not to wonder if, with his relationship with Ava a distant memory, his Aunt Helen now dead, his relationship with his father damaged beyond Raylan's interest in salvaging it, and even his rivalry with Boyd having settled into a low-stakes cat-and-mouse game, Raylan doesn't have as much personal stake in setting Harlan straight."

Todd VanDerWerff of Los Angeles Times wrote, "'The Devil You Know' spends too much time getting the chess pieces into place to be a wholly terrific episode of Justified, but the chess pieces here are so much fun to watch interact that seeing them get shoved around isn't so bad." Dan Forcella of TV Fanatic gave the episode a 4 star rating out of 5 and wrote, "It was probably my least favorite of the first four episodes, but 'The Devil You Know' also gave us some insight into Rachel's back story, the return of Loretta and that great scene in which Limehouse and his man saved Dickie Bennett and the $46,000." Jack McKinney of Paste gave the episode a 8.5 rating out of 10 and wrote, "The payoff for the viewer is that with weight comes momentum. At this point, every conversation is so densely packed with subtext that every word seems to pull the story forward a little bit and there is a palpable sense of picking up steam."
