= Guy Walks into a Bar (Justified) =

- Justified episode
- Episode no.: Season 3 Episode 10
- Directed by: Tony Goldwyn
- Written by: VJ Boyd
- Cinematography by: Francis Kenny
- Editing by: Dorian Harris
- Original air date: March 20, 2012
- Running time: 41 minutes

Guest appearances
- Mykelti Williamson as Ellstin Limehouse; Jeremy Davies as Dickie Bennett; Jere Burns as Wynn Duffy; Marshall Allman as Donovan; David Andrews as Sheriff Tillman Napier; Jim Beaver as Shelby Parlow; Rick Gomez as AUSA David Vasquez; David Meunier as Johnny Crowder; Stephen Root as Judge Mike Reardon; Richard Speight Jr. as Jed Berwind; Demetrius Grosse as Errol; William Gregory Lee as Will Mooney; Jenn Lyon as Lindsey Salazar; Neal McDonough as Robert Quarles

Episode chronology
← Previous "Loose Ends"	Next → "Measures"
- Justified (season 3)

"Guy Walks into a Bar" is the tenth episode of the third season of the American Neo-Western television series Justified. It is the 36th overall episode of the series and was written by VJ Boyd and directed by Tony Goldwyn. It originally aired on FX on March 20, 2012.

The series is based on Elmore Leonard's stories about the character Raylan Givens, particularly "Fire in the Hole", which serves as the basis for the episode. The series follows Raylan Givens, a tough deputy U.S. Marshal enforcing his own brand of justice. The series revolves around the inhabitants and culture in the Appalachian Mountains area of eastern Kentucky, specifically Harlan County where many of the main characters grew up. In the episode, Boyd and Quarles maneuver to get their candidate to win the upcoming Sheriff's election. Meanwhile, Raylan discovers that Dickie may be released from jail and works to ensure he is not released.

According to Nielsen Media Research, the episode was seen by an estimated 2.32 million household viewers and gained a 0.9 ratings share among adults aged 18–49. The episode received universal acclaim from critics, who praised the writing and character development. Critics in particular highlighted Neal McDonough's performance in the episode as the standout.

== Plot ==
Officers sent by Napier (David Andrews) try to plant evidence on a car belonging to Parlow (Jim Beaver) but Parlow shows up and threatens them with a shotgun to leave his property. Limehouse (Mykelti Williamson) hedges his bets and introduces Boyd (Walton Goggins) to Quarles' campaign manager.

Boyd also visits Napier's sister to offer her a job in his campaign. Raylan (Timothy Olyphant) is told by Judge Mike Reardon (Stephen Root) that Dickie (Jeremy Davies) will be released from jail due to lack of evidence on Raylan's kidnapping and Helen's death. Raylan then interrogates Jed Berwind (Richard Speight Jr.), telling him to change his testimony and reveal the truth that Dickie killed Helen. Jed says he will only talk if his grandmother approves it, as he owes a debt to the Bennetts. However, his grandmother refuses to speak.

As they await the results of the election, Ava (Joelle Carter) is revealed to have offered sexual favors from prostitutes to Parlow's voters. Boyd then tells the room the results: Napier won. At his office, Napier talks with Quarles (Neal McDonough), where Quarles wants him to get an office for himself. However, Napier is visited by officers, who state that his sister took a job in the county and nepotism isn't allowed in political campaigns—a scheme orchestrated by Boyd himself. Therefore, Napier is not eligible for the election, making Parlow the winner and angering Quarles. Quarles leaves the office, where he is taunted by Boyd in the parking lot.

The loss sends Quarles into a drug-fueled tailspin while he talks with Duffy (Jere Burns) in their trailer. Suddenly, a young man named Donovan (Marshall Allman) enters the trailer, holding a gun. Donovan thinks Quarles was involved in the disappearance (and likely death) of his friend Brady Hughes. Under the effect of the pills, Quarles talks with Donovan about his story: his heroin-addicted father prostituted him as a child to feed his own addiction. Theo Tonin learned about this and offered him a chance to kill his father, which Quarles himself did. He claims to have seen himself in Brady and "set him free". Donovan drops his gun and embraces Quarles, confused.

Raylan visits the bar downstairs and finds a high Quarles and Duffy in the area. After he asks them to leave, Quarles threatens Raylan that he will kill him someday. As they are about to leave, Raylan shoots to the ceiling and orders the patrons to leave the bar. Raylan challenges Quarles to a gun draw right there, which he happily accepts. Bartender Lindsey (Jenn Lyon) draws out a shotgun and orders Quarles and Duffy to leave. After the events, Raylan and Lindsey have sex in Raylan's apartment, where we see the bullet hole that he shot downstairs.

The next day, Raylan attends Dickie's hearing. Raylan bungles his testimony in favor of Dickie remaining in prison, and tells Reardon to release Dickie because he will slip up again or be killed in the process. At Noble's Holler, Limehouse hears from Errol (Demetrius Grosse) that Dickie is getting out, which might cause problems for the missing Bennett fortune, and tells Errol to bring Dickie to him. In his hotel room, Quarles snorts Oxycontin with repeating a mantra to himself and strips naked. He then enters the bathroom, to reveal that he has Donovan bound and gagged.

== Production ==
=== Development ===
In February 2012, it was reported that the tenth episode of the third season would be titled "Guy Walks into a Bar", and was to be directed by Tony Goldwyn and written by VJ Boyd.

=== Writing ===
Series developer Graham Yost revealed that the tactics used by Boyd in the episode to eliminate Napier from the election was based on a true story from an undisclosed city in Kentucky. Regarding Boyd's comments to Quarles, Yost said "Boyd and many people will come to regret that Boyd just didn't kill him that night. But what Boyd doesn't know that we do is that Quarles has a secret power — he's got a gun up his sleeve. We always want to sort of keep that in mind, that at any point, Quarles can get the drop on anyone."

The episode delved into the backstory of Quarles' past with the Detroit mob, something that Yost previously teased. According to Yost, the writers didn't plan any of Quarles' backstory when the season began and added more details as it went on. It also revealed the identity of the man that Quarles had bound and gagged on his house on "Harlan Roulette" as Brady Hughes.

=== Casting ===
Despite being credited, Jacob Pitts, Erica Tazel and Natalie Zea do not appear in the episode as their respective characters.

The episode brought back Richard Speight Jr. as Jed Berwind, following his last appearance on "Reckoning". Yost explained that "it was just that there was some mystery about what his family owed Mags Bennett's family. We just decided to make it concrete and tell the story."

== Reception ==
=== Viewers ===
In its original American broadcast, "Guy Walks into a Bar" was seen by an estimated 2.32 million household viewers and gained a 0.9 ratings share among adults aged 18–49, according to Nielsen Media Research. This means that 0.9 percent of all households with televisions watched the episode. This was a slight increase in viewership from the previous episode, which was watched by 2.26 million viewers with a 0.9 in the 18-49 demographics.

=== Critical reviews ===
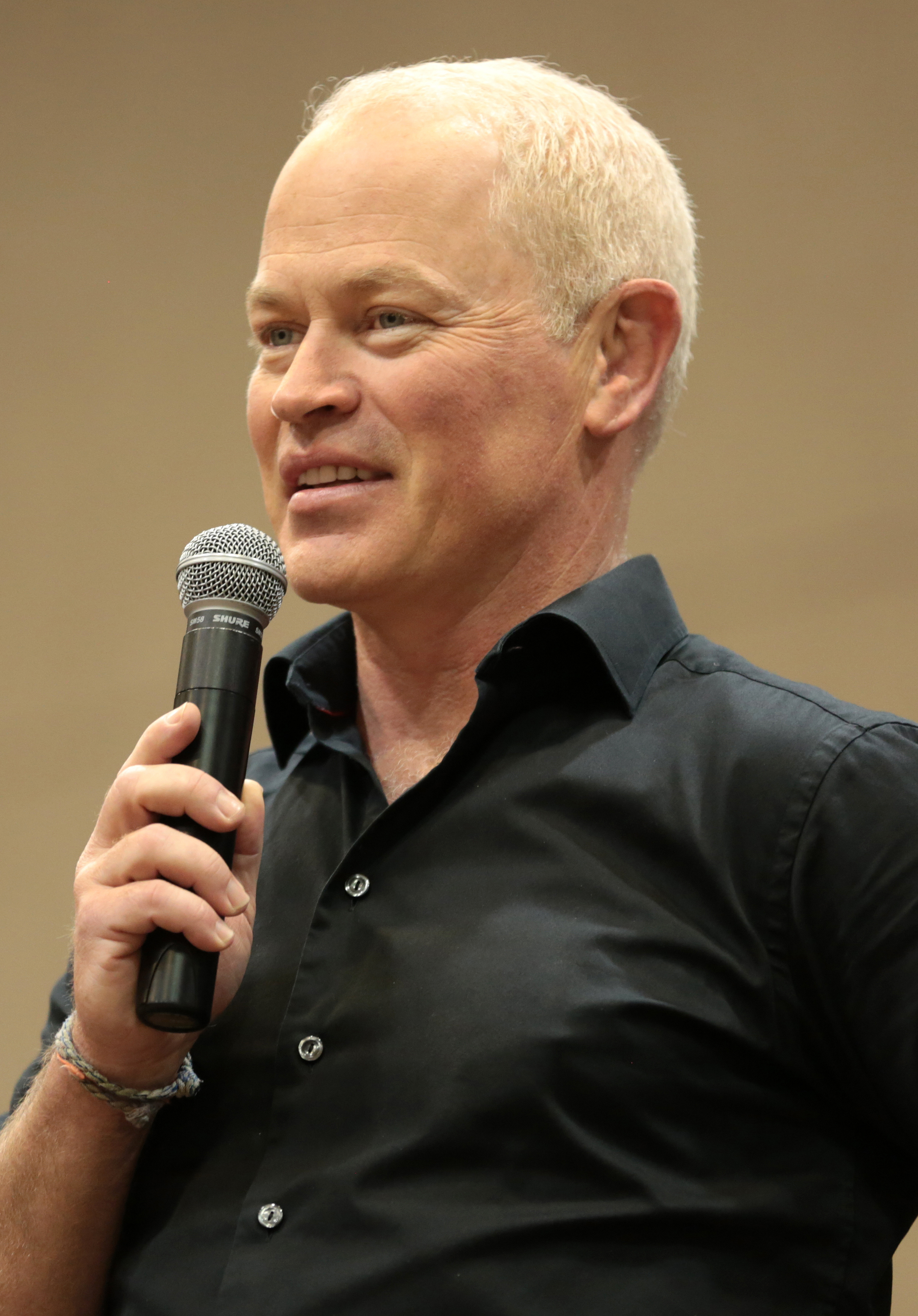
Neal McDonough's performance in the episode received universal acclaim from critics, with many highlighting Quarles' character development.

"Guy Walks into a Bar" received universal acclaim from critics. Seth Amitin of IGN gave the episode an "amazing" 9.5 out of 10 and wrote, "Quarles is crazy. This was expected, given what little background we were given, but the writers had a choice to either give him depth in that background or leave it superficial and humorous. They chose the former and it turns out they knew exactly what they were doing this whole time. Quarles is messed up."

Scott Tobias of The A.V. Club gave the episode an "A−" grade and wrote, "There are good scenes throughout 'Guy Walks Into A Bar' — which, among other things, digs into the finer points of Harlan politics — but it's Quarles' scenes that give it the biggest lift. We'll see how the closing stretch of episodes play out, but it seems to me his mission has changed." Kevin Fitzpatrick of Screen Crush wrote, "Wow. Just when you think Quarles is the man who has it all together, he proves himself the crazy equivalent to Mags Bennett's calculated villainy! But is Raylan's inability to speak up for his own aunt's demise at the hands of Dickie any better? The board is set, and the pieces are moving, and we've only a few more weeks to find out how Quarles will unravel further, or at least how he gets that hair so blonde."

Alan Sepinwall of HitFix wrote, "Last week's episode was more of a piece-mover, which I said I would be fine with so long as the next episode was strong in the way that 'Watching the Detectives' so perfectly followed 'The Man Behind the Curtain'. Having now seen 'Guy Walks Into the Bar', I can only say one thing to Graham Yost and company: Move all the damn pieces you want, for as long as you need, if you can pay it off with an episode like this. That was fantastic. Best episode of the season so far by a long stretch, and one of the best hours Justified has given us so far." Luke de Smet of Slant Magazine wrote, "It's fitting that the title of this week's installment of Justified is the classic joke lead-in 'Guy Walks Into a Bar', because the entire episode plays out like the season's punchline. It's the point when all of Harlan County's absurdities become so extreme they begin to wrap back around on themselves, and everyone finally just throws their hands in the air and says, 'Screw it'. Really, the episode may as well have been titled 'Forget It, Raylan, It's Harlan County.'"

Ben Lee of Digital Spy wrote, "FX drama Justified brought its A-game this week, no doubt. Between Boyd's genius craftiness, a nerve-wracking stand-off between Raylan and Quarles and a disturbing final scene, 'Guy Walks into a Bar' delivers one of the season's strongest episodes to date." Joe Reid of Vulture had a mixed review, writing, "As the weeks have played themselves out, and after the events of 'Guy Walks Into a Bar', the balance of his character has tipped toward the more operatic side, and I have to admit, he's lost me."

Todd VanDerWerff of Los Angeles Times wrote, "I've said week after week here that this season of Justified - while brilliant on an episode-by-episode level - has been a little convoluted and messy at the level of the season-long plot. At the same time, though, that's an easy problem to fix. If the show pulls out an all-time great season finale in a few weeks, then we'll forget about how all of the pieces didn't make as much sense together as they might have in the buildup to that finale." Dan Forcella of TV Fanatic gave the episode a perfect 5 star rating out of 5 and wrote, "Any negatives I had to say about the third season after last week's episode were pretty much wiped clean following 'Guy Walks Into A Bar'. I loved this hour, and the season seems to be coming to an exciting end with the downfall of Robert Quarles." Jack McKinney of Paste gave the episode a 9 out of 10 rating and wrote, "There are only three episodes remaining this season and I don't expect the pace to let up much from here on out. Pray for peace. Prepare for blood."
