= Raylan =

2012 novel by Elmore Leonard

- Author: Elmore Leonard
- Language: English
- Genre: Crime/Contemporary
- Publisher: William Morrow
- Publication date: 2012
- Publication place: United States
- English publication date: 26 December 2012
- Media type: Hardcover
- Pages: 288
- Preceded by: Riding the Rap

Raylan is a 2012 novel by Elmore Leonard, the author's final work before he died in 2013.

The novel is based on the FX television series Justified, which was in turn based on Leonard's short story "Fire in the Hole" and the character of Raylan Givens, who appeared in that short story as well as the novels Pronto and Riding the Rap. Raylan is not a direct sequel to any of these novels, nor is it a direct sequel to the television series. Elements from both are changed: Boyd Crowder (who died in "Fire in the Hole" but is still alive in Justified) is alive and a major character in Raylan, while characters original to Justified such as Dickie and Coover Bennett return in repurposed forms, as Dickie and Coover Crowe.

Several plotlines in Raylan were adapted by the writers of Justified into episodes of the show's third season, most notably with the episode "Thick as Mud."
