= Wrong Roads =

- Justified episode
- Episode no.: Season 5 Episode 9
- Directed by: Michael Dinner
- Written by: Dave Andron & Leonard Chang
- Cinematography by: Francis Kenny
- Editing by: Eric L. Beason
- Original air date: March 11, 2014
- Running time: 52 minutes

Guest appearances
- Michael Rapaport as Daryl Crowe Jr.; A. J. Buckley as Danny Crowe; Dale Dickey as Judith; Joshua Harto as Agent Henkins; Steve Harris as Roscoe; Wood Harris as Jay; Deidrie Henry as Rowena; Damon Herriman as Dewey Crowe; Mickey Jones as Rodney "Hot Rod" Dunham; John Kapelos as Picker; Jesse Luken as Jimmy Tolan; Jacob Lofland as Kendal Crowe; Eric Roberts as Agent Alex Miller; Alicia Witt as Wendy Crowe; Muse Watson as Elmont Swain; Justin Welborn as Carl

Episode chronology
← Previous "Whistle Past the Graveyard"	Next → "Weight"
- Justified (season 5)

"Wrong Roads" is the ninth episode of the fifth season of the American Neo-Western television series Justified. It is the 61st overall episode of the series and was written by executive producer Dave Andron and story editor Leonard Chang and directed by executive producer Michael Dinner. It originally aired on FX on March 11, 2014.

The series is based on Elmore Leonard's stories about the character Raylan Givens, particularly "Fire in the Hole", which serves as the basis for the episode. The series follows Raylan Givens, a tough deputy U.S. Marshal enforcing his own brand of justice. The series revolves around the inhabitants and culture in the Appalachian Mountains area of eastern Kentucky, specifically Harlan County where many of the main characters grew up. In the episode, Raylan partners with a maverick DEA agent whose bad behavior feels uncomfortably familiar, while Boyd makes a hard choice to protect Ava.

According to Nielsen Media Research, the episode was seen by an estimated 2.24 million household viewers and gained a 0.8 ratings share among adults aged 18–49. The episode received generally positive reviews from critics, who praised the new progress on the storyline, although critics still felt that the episode lacked momentum.

== Plot ==
In Texas, Dewey (Damon Herriman), Danny (A. J. Buckley) and Carl (Justin Welborn) receive the drug shipment from their contacts and depart for Kentucky. While talking with Daryl (Michael Rapaport), Boyd (Walton Goggins) tells him he knows about the set-up in the desert, which he doesn't deny.

Raylan (Timothy Olyphant) receives the case of Johnny's murder along with Hot Rod's henchmen. He goes to Memphis, Tennessee, meeting with DEA Agent Alex Miller (Eric Roberts), asking for his help in finding Hot Rod (Mickey Jones). Raylan and the DEA find one of Hot Rod's warehouses, finding Jay (Wood Harris) and Roscoe (Steve Harris) and arrest them. However, Jay and Roscoe overcome their captor and they are revealed to have Hot Rod held in another warehouse. Hot Rod stabs his captor in the neck with a pencil but is shot in the process. Raylan and Miller reach Hot Rod, who tells them Boyd may be behind Johnny's death, but he dies of his injuries. Prior to his death, it is revealed that Hot Rod was a criminal informant for Miller.

Boyd visits Ava (Joelle Carter) in prison, who tells him that nurse Rowena (Deidrie Henry) will leave the prison and will need his help in exchange for protecting her, which he accepts to do. Rowena visits Boyd at his bar, intending to smuggle drugs into prison and wants his help in getting revenge against a person who killed her partner. Boyd visits the man, Elmont Swain (Muse Watson) at a nursing home. Elmont defends his actions, stating that his wife died due to the drugs smuggled in prison. Despite the assignment, Boyd symphatizes with Elmont and offers to get him out of the home to live his remaining days in peace. He and Jimmy (Jesse Luken) take Elmont on a trip in his truck, where Jimmy strangles Elmont until he is dead. Rowena then gives Ava a new task: she has to kill Judith (Dale Dickey).

Jay and Roscoe intercept a meeting between Boyd, Daryl, Duffy (Jere Burns) and Picker (John Kapelos). However, Raylan and Miller arrive and order them to drop their weapons. Roscoe resists, causing Miller to kill him and arrest Jay. After he is released, Daryl visits Kendal (Jacob Lofland) and Wendy (Alicia Witt) and discovers the money that Raylan gave to Kendal, causing Kendal, who lied and said he stole from the johns at Audrey’s, to storm out. Raylan returns to his office and has a confrontation with Art (Nick Searcy) about their new status. While driving back, Miller spots the tow truck driven by Dewey and Danny, knowing it’s a method to smuggle drugs. After Miller cuts the pair off and orders them to surrender, Danny turns hostile and refuses to follow Miller's orders, showing him his knife. The two are about to have a fight when Dewey suddenly turns up the tow truck and hits both of them and escapes, tired of his cousin’s verbal abuse.

== Production ==
=== Development ===
In February 2014, it was reported that the ninth episode of the fifth season would be titled "Wrong Roads", and was to be directed by executive producer Michael Dinner and written by executive producer Dave Andron and story editor Leonard Chang.

=== Writing ===
The storyline about Jay and Roscoe was originally different. Series developer Graham Yost said, "so we were gonna separate them, and then the remaining brother was gonna be on a revenge mission and looking for Boyd. The Harris brothers didn't want to do that. They wanted to either play together or not play. So we had to reevaluate quickly, and Andron and Tim [Olyphant], actually, came up with this notion of the two brothers going on this adventure together. And it ended up being a much better episode. We adapted, and it turned into something really fun: It was just the basic setup of one brother's very verbal and the other one says nothing, and then we go for the big twist — Steve would suddenly start to speak, and speak well, and be very loquacious."

=== Casting ===
Despite being credited, Jacob Pitts and Erica Tazel do not appear in the episode as their respective characters.

Eric Roberts's casting occurred thanks to his connection to executive producer Michael Dinner. Yost said, "so we'd been looking from early in the season for what would be a good thing to try to get him to do, and just the idea of him being the Ghost of Raylan Future to a degree was something that appealed to us. The fact that he was willing to do it really appealed to us."

== Reception ==
=== Viewers ===
In its original American broadcast, "Wrong Roads" was seen by an estimated 2.24 million household viewers and gained a 0.8 ratings share among adults aged 18–49, according to Nielsen Media Research. This means that 0.8 percent of all households with televisions watched the episode. This was a 4% decrease in viewership from the previous episode, which was watched by 2.32 million viewers with a 0.9 in the 18-49 demographics.

=== Critical reviews ===
"Wrong Roads" received generally positive reviews from critics. Seth Amitin of IGN gave the episode a "good" 7.9 out of 10 and wrote in his verdict, "As we close in on the end of what's been a rough season for Justified, the elements of the story are coming together. Daryl and the Crowes are getting involved in something that's way above their ability and will likely find themselves in deep trouble in the next couple of weeks. Raylan talks of change. Boyd is at the end of his rope. Ava needs to do something quickly. As the heroin shipment arrives in Harlan in the next episode, we'll see exactly how the pieces will fall into place and hopefully we'll be interested enough to keep watching."

Alasdair Wilkins of The A.V. Club gave the episode an "A−" grade and wrote, "'Wrong Roads' isn't a perfect episode of Justified, though it does represent a substantial step up from its three immediate predecessors. It suffers from many of the same problems that the show has struggled with since 'Shot All To Hell', or perhaps since the beginning of this season. There's still not really a clear sense of where this season is headed, and the division of screen time between three separate stories makes for some glacial pacing." Kevin Fitzpatrick of Screen Crush wrote, "It's hard to tell exactly where it all leads in only 4 episodes, though 'Wrong Roads' clearly provides the most cohesive story breaks we've had all season, with plenty of excitement promised in the coming weeks."

Alan Sepinwall of HitFix wrote, "It's not that I especially care about the heroin shipment, but that so much of the season has been about this one problem that I just want it resolved already so we can move onto something more interesting. Wendy and Kendal can't wait to get away from this mess, and I do not exactly blame them." James Quealley of The Star-Ledger wrote, "'Wrong Turns' was a good, not great, episode of Justified and one that was sorely needed. I remain of the opinion that a down season of this series is still better than most anything else I watch, but when you've had as good of a run as Justified has, the audience has a hard time accepting anything less."

Matt Zoller Seitz of Vulture gave the episode a 3 star rating out of 5 and wrote, "Figures. On the same night I went on Twitter and moaned about Justified's lack of oomph, the show delivered one of its better season-five episodes, 'Wrong Roads'. There still seems to be a lot of motion for motion's sake, but a sense of urgency has settled in. Are we finally getting somewhere?" Holly Anderson of Grantland wrote, "The last 15 minutes of this hour could've easily been spun out into an entire episode, and the last five are particularly jam-packed with information."

Dan Forcella of TV Fanatic gave the episode a 4.1 star rating out of 5 and wrote, "Overall, this was a depressing hour and that's saying a lot for Justified. Raylan had a victory, but it came with even more disappointment and anger from Art. It was all about mayhem and death. Even Kendal and Wendy didn't get a moment of happiness. Their goal of getting out was shut down by Daryl and Kendal lost his money stash." Jack McKinney of Paste gave the episode a 9.3 out of 10 and wrote, "They're probably right. I won't look forward to the middle section of this season when I watch it over again later this year, but the anticipation of this episode will smooth over a lot of edges."
