= Over the Mountain (Justified) =

- Justified episode
- Episode no.: Season 5 Episode 4
- Directed by: Gwyneth Horder-Payton
- Written by: Taylor Elmore
- Cinematography by: Francis Kenny
- Editing by: Steve Polivka
- Original air date: January 28, 2014
- Running time: 44 minutes

Guest appearances
- Michael Rapaport as Daryl Crowe Jr.; James LeGros as Wade Messer; Edi Gathegi as Jean Baptiste; David Meunier as Johnny Crowder; Sam Anderson as Lee Paxton; A. J. Buckley as Danny Crowe; Rick Gomez as AUSA David Vasquez; Shashawnee Hall as Chief Deputy U.S. Marshal Ed Kirkland; Damon Herriman as Dewey Crowe; Jacob Lofland as Kendal Crowe; Will Sasso as Al Sura; Amy Smart as Alison Brander; Danny Strong as Albert Fekus; Karolina Wydra as Mara Paxton; Mickey Jones as Rodney "Hot Rod" Dunham; William Gregory Lee as Nick Mooney; Justin Welborn as Carl

Episode chronology
← Previous "Good Intentions"	Next → "Shot All to Hell"
- Justified (season 5)

"Over the Mountain" is the fourth episode of the fifth season of the American Neo-Western television series Justified. It is the 56th overall episode of the series and was written by co-executive producer Taylor Elmore and directed by Gwyneth Horder-Payton. It originally aired on FX on January 28, 2014.

The series is based on Elmore Leonard's stories about the character Raylan Givens, particularly "Fire in the Hole", which serves as the basis for the episode. The series follows Raylan Givens, a tough deputy U.S. Marshal enforcing his own brand of justice. The series revolves around the inhabitants and culture in the Appalachian Mountains area of eastern Kentucky, specifically Harlan County where many of the main characters grew up. In the episode, Raylan ventures into wild country on the hunt for a missing informant, while Boyd's last living relative, Johnny, threatens his life and livelihood.

According to Nielsen Media Research, the episode was seen by an estimated 2.36 million household viewers and gained a 0.8 ratings share among adults aged 18–49. The episode received positive reviews from critics, who praised Damon Herriman's acting but critics also expressed frustration at the episode's pace and lack of progress in the plot.

== Plot ==
Dewey (Damon Herriman) and Wade (James LeGros) go to the woods to dig something. In reality, Dewey intends to kill Wade and is making him dig his own grave. Wade turns around and Dewey shoots him in the stomach, but Wade attacks him until Dewey knocks him over with a shovel. As the shovel breaks, Dewey is forced to take a crowbar from the car. However, when he returns, he finds that Wade is nowhere to be found.

Raylan (Timothy Olyphant) is told by Art (Nick Searcy) and Vasquez (Rick Gomez) that Wade was an informant for them and request that Raylan finds him. He and Tim (Jacob Pitts) check Audrey's but only find Kendal (Jacob Lofland) tending the bar. They then check Wade's house, only to find Danny (A. J. Buckley) in the property. Johnny (David Meunier), whose condition has improved and can now walk without a cane, meets with Boyd (Walton Goggins) to visit Ava (Joelle Carter) in prison. Johnny defends his decisions, stating that everything is Boyd's fault and leaves. Boyd sends Carl (Justin Welborn) to follow Johnny in car.

Dewey gets lost in the woods while trying to find Wade and finds that he has no service in his phone. Desperate, he asks for a sign of God, promising to clean himself after killing Wade. Just then, he notices a blood tail and discovers a severely wounded Wade nearby. Before he shoots him, a family finds him, failing to notice Wade. Dewey then decides to leave with the family, leaving Wade to die in the woods. In prison, Ava is sexually harassed by a guard, Albert Fekus (Danny Strong), whose plans to assault her are thwarted when a female guard shows up. Later, the female guard attacks Fekus for trying to assault Ava, and makes him promise to never do it again.

Raylan gets Wade's burner phone from Boyd in an attempt to locate him with a GPS. The phone gets him to a lodge where a murder of crows reveal that his corpse is nearby. Dewey contacts Daryl (Michael Rapaport) about his location and they set to go to the lodge. However, they notice the authorities have found Wade's corpse and they leave. When Dewey angrily confronts him about why he ordered him to kill him, Daryl says he tested him to say if he was a Crowe. Dewey exclaims that he is not a Crowe but Daryl points out that he shot at Wade.

Boyd and Carl eventually discover that Johnny met with Hot Rod (Mickey Jones) for the drug shipment. Art has gone to Detroit as he has a possible lead on Sammy Tonin's role in Nicky Augustine's death. Marshal Ed Kirkland (Shashawnee Hall) introduces him to Canadian gangster Al Sura (Will Sasso), who previously dealt with Boyd. Sura says that Sammy had a Kentucky lawman on his pocket who let him kill Nicky Augustine. He says that for more information, they must find Picker, who is hiding with Wynn Duffy. Meanwhile, Paxton (Sam Anderson) returns home, where he is convinced by Mooney (William Gregory Lee) that he killed Boyd. He tells Mara (Karolina Wydra) that he intends to pursue a case against Ava.

Raylan confronts Daryl, accusing the Crowes of being involved in Wade's death. He orders them to return to Florida but Daryl refuses to do it. So Raylan decides to put Kendal on state custody, as he was a minor serving alcohol earlier. The Crowes and Raylan are about to start a fight when Kendal agrees to leave with him to avoid problems. The episode ends as Carl shows Boyd the corpses of the men they killed at the bridge and men who were in the shipment robbery.

== Production ==
=== Development ===
In December 2013, it was reported that the fourth episode of the fifth season would be titled "Over the Mountain", and was to be directed by Gwyneth Horder-Payton and written by co-executive producer Taylor Elmore.

=== Writing ===
The writers were considering putting the opening scene as the last scene of the previous episode. Series developer Graham Yost said, "we often think of ending an episode on a cliffhanger, and then almost invariably, we end up moving off that and trying to put it all in the same episode. We just thought that was a strong way to open. Part of it is Dewey's character: We don't know that he's ever killed anyone before. He's a violent criminal. He's a bad guy. But, he's also Dewey, and there's something so hapless about him that we just thought this could be, in the classic Elmore sense, a really scary, funny thing for an episode."

=== Casting ===
Despite being credited, Jere Burns and Erica Tazel do not appear in the episode as their respective characters.

On casting Danny Strong, the writers needed "someone who could be believably beaten up by a female guard." Executive producer Dave Andron knew Strong, offered him a part and he accepted.

== Reception ==
=== Viewers ===
In its original American broadcast, "Over the Mountain" was seen by an estimated 2.36 million household viewers and gained a 0.8 ratings share among adults aged 18–49, according to Nielsen Media Research. This means that 0.8 percent of all households with televisions watched the episode. This was a 6% decrease in viewership from the previous episode, which was watched by 2.50 million viewers with a 0.9 in the 18-49 demographics.

=== Critical reviews ===
"Over the Mountain" received positive reviews from critics. Seth Amitin of IGN gave the episode a "good" 7.9 out of 10 and wrote in his verdict, "Viewers of Justified should feel snug right now. It's a slow build and the building of its suspended plots are what make it pay off in the end. So here we are, episode 4, and things are building. Dewey, despite his windfall, is struggling to maintain any power; Darryl is forcing his way into the fold; Boyd is trying to stay afloat in business and in life; and something is about to happen to Raylan, though we don't know what. You can see the future if you look closely: Darryl continues to force his way in and forces the hands of Dewey and Boyd; Dewey comes to a point where he must choose to fight for himself or ride Darryl's coattails; Boyd must find a way to get Darryl out of the picture; Raylan either sits on the sidelines trying to beat the Sammy Tonin rap or helps kick Darryl to the curb. That we don't know what happens even though we can see the outline of it is what keeps us tuning in."

Alasdair Wilkins of The A.V. Club gave the episode a "B+" grade and wrote, "'Over The Mountain' is primarily the story of the Crowes, and as such this episode once again explores a theme that has so far dominated the fifth season: Boyd and Raylan ignore or underestimate foes at their own risk." Kevin Fitzpatrick of Screen Crush wrote, "If nothing else, the family theme at least lands like the blunt impact of a shovel to the head, Allison's tale reinforcing how the very word can outshine the cruelest of treatment for your actual kin. Raylan's morality has taken something of a spitshine in recent episodes, to say the least, but remanding young Kendall Crowe into custody seemed petty and provoking, even by his standards."

Alan Sepinwall of HitFix wrote, "'Over the Mountain' isn't exactly the Justified equivalent of 'Pine Barrens' from The Sopranos, in that all of Dewey Crowe's misfortunes happen on his own turf, where the whole point of 'Pine Barrens' was putting suburban gangsters in the wilderness. But when you put a criminal in the woods and have him suffer one humiliation after another in black comic fashion, it's going to evoke one of the most famous TV hours ever. And it was the Justified-specific elements of it that made 'Over the Mountain' work as more than just a rehash of a classic." James Quealley of The Star-Ledger wrote, "As we move toward the midway point of Justified's fifth season, it's no surprise that we're being hit with a couple of table-setter episodes. There isn't much difference between 'Good Intentions' and 'Over The Mountain', as both episodes are lining up shots for later in the year while Raylan paces through a tale where he's more observer than agitator. But where last week's episode felt like it was moving pieces, this one managed to pleasantly distract me from that fact."

Joe Reid of Vulture gave the episode a 4 star rating out of 5 and wrote, "This week's Justified is about secrets and fake-outs. We're entering that typically busy middle period of a season. The subplots have begun to intertwine." Holly Anderson of Grantland wrote, "Raylan looks a little sorry, in that pinched, slightly sheepish way of his. We are too; Wade has been the best source of comic relief this season, aside from Rachel trying to paper-train the protagonist."

Dan Forcella of TV Fanatic gave the episode a 4.5 star rating out of 5 and wrote, "Damon Haerriman has been great since joining the show, but in the early parts of Justified Season 5, and in 'Over the Mountain' specifically, he was just fantastic. The dude plays stupid and scared as well as anyone I've seen." Jack McKinney of Paste gave the episode a 9 out of 10 and wrote, "Of course, even the luckiest gamblers roll craps eventually, and Messer stayed in the game one throw too long. But Justified's loss is our gain as the loss of James Le Gros brings the season’s course into sharper focus."
