= Shot All to Hell =

- Justified episode
- Episode no.: Season 5 Episode 5
- Directed by: Adam Arkin
- Written by: Chris Provenzano
- Cinematography by: Francis Kenny
- Editing by: Steven Nevius
- Original air date: February 4, 2014
- Running time: 49 minutes

Guest appearances
- Michael Rapaport as Daryl Crowe Jr.; Edi Gathegi as Jean Baptiste; David Meunier as Johnny Crowder; Sam Anderson as Lee Paxton; Adam Arkin as Theo Tonin; A. J. Buckley as Danny Crowe; Rick Gomez as AUSA David Vasquez; Steve Harris as Roscoe; Wood Harris as Jay; Damon Herriman as Dewey Crowe; John Kapelos as Picker; Jesse Luken as Jimmy Tolan; Jacob Lofland as Kendal Crowe; Don McManus as Billy Geist; Alan Tudyk as Elias Marcos (credited as Wray Nerely); Will Sasso as Al Sura; Amy Smart as Alison Brander; Danny Strong as Albert Fekus; Alicia Witt as Wendy Crowe; Karolina Wydra as Mara Paxton; Mickey Jones as Rodney "Hot Rod" Dunham; William Gregory Lee as Nick Mooney

Episode chronology
← Previous "Over the Mountain"	Next → "Kill the Messenger"
- Justified (season 5)

"Shot All to Hell" is the fifth episode of the fifth season of the American Neo-Western television series Justified. It is the 57th overall episode of the series and was written by supervising producer Chris Provenzano and directed by Adam Arkin. It originally aired on FX on February 4, 2014.

The series is based on Elmore Leonard's stories about the character Raylan Givens, particularly "Fire in the Hole", which serves as the basis for the episode. The series follows Raylan Givens, a tough deputy U.S. Marshal enforcing his own brand of justice. The series revolves around the inhabitants and culture in the Appalachian Mountains area of eastern Kentucky, specifically Harlan County where many of the main characters grew up. In the episode, Raylan's secrets are at stake when a mob revenge plot descends upon Kentucky, and Boyd's recent successes are tempered by a crushing defeat.

According to Nielsen Media Research, the episode was seen by an estimated 2.39 million household viewers and gained a 0.9 ratings share among adults aged 18–49. The episode received critical acclaim, with critics praising the writing, character development, Alan Tudyk's guest performance and ending.

== Plot ==
Paxton (Sam Anderson) wakes up in the middle of the night when Mooney (William Gregory Lee) calls him to tell him that they found six corpses in his funeral home associated with a shooting, causing Paxton to deduce Boyd (Walton Goggins) is alive. When he hangs up, he finds Boyd in his bedroom, who taunts him by saying that his reputation and legacy are ruined. He then shoots Paxton in the mouth and stages his death to make it look like a suicide.

In Windsor, Ontario, Al Sura (Will Sasso) is killed by a hitman named Elias Marcos (Alan Tudyk) after confessing to all the crimes committed by his associates. Meanwhile, Wendy (Alicia Witt) arrives in Harlan and takes custody of Kendal (Jacob Lofland) from Alison (Amy Smart). Raylan (Timothy Olyphant) tells her that he wants the Crowes out of Kentucky and plans to reinstate their parole. Art (Nick Searcy) watches a meeting between Duffy (Jere Burns) and Picker (John Kapelos) when he notices Marcos nearby. He talks with Marcos outside a fast-food restaurant and threatens him to leave. Art then talks with Duffy and Picker in the restaurant, when Marcos enters and demands that they hand over Picker. Art dissuades him and Marcos leaves.

Daryl (Michael Rapaport) and Baptiste (Edi Gathegi) visit Boyd at his bar, demanding that he returns the money that he stole from Dewey (Damon Herriman). Boyd and Jimmy (Jesse Luken) force them to leave when they threaten them with guns. Boyd meets with Hot Rod (Mickey Jones) about partnering in smuggling heroin to Mexico but Hot Rod is very skeptical of its success. He later meets with Mooney and Mara (Karolina Wydra) in a restaurant and after Mooney states that Paxton will now be responsible for the corpses, a hitman hired by Boyd enters and kills Mooney. Boyd tells Mara that the man is dying and he supplied his family with the money that he was going to give to Mara. He tells Mara to leave Harlan and never come back. With Mooney's and Paxton's deaths, the case against Ava (Joelle Carter) is dropped and she will be released the next day.

Raylan sees Art and Vasquez (Rick Gomez) questioning Picker, who reveals that Marcos is Theo Tonin's consigliere. Raylan privately talks with Picker, threatening him to reveal Marcos' location. Raylan and Art head to a warehouse, where Marcos awaits for them with a large shotgun. After a tense gunfight, Raylan kills Marcos by shooting him in the back. Art laments that they lost the only man who could lead them to Tonin when authorities discover a blood trail to a container. They open the container to find a bandaged Tonin (Adam Arkin) inside.

In prison, Ava and an inmate are visited by Fekus (Danny Strong), who takes a knife and stabs himself. The inmate then exclaims that Ava stabbed Fekus and guards take Ava. An angry Boyd goes to the county jail, where he is told that she will now be transferred to a state penitentiary. At Audrey's, Wendy allows Daryl to keep Kendal if he provides a better home for him and agrees to stay in Harlan. Baptiste talks with Danny about missing grocery items and their talk soon turns into a confrontation, which ends when Danny suddenly kills Baptiste with a shotgun in front of Kendal. He then threatens Kendal to never tell anyone about the murder.

Hot Rod visits Johnny (David Meunier) during a poker game night with Jay (Wood Harris) and Roscoe (Steve Harris) when Jay and Roscoe point their guns at Johnny, as Hot Rod reached a deal with Boyd for Johnny. However, Johnny reveals that he invested his money and split it with Jay and Roscoe, who now point a shocked Hot Rod with their guns. At the Marshal's office, while they celebrate, Vasquez reveals to Art and Raylan that Picker confessed that a lawman worked on Sammy's pocket and allowed the assassination of Nicky Augustine. Raylan gets nervous, until Vasquez states that it was probably missing FBI Agent Jerry Barkley. After Vasquez leaves, Raylan also goes. However, he returns and tells Art that the lawman wasn't Barkley.

== Production ==
=== Development ===
In January 2014, it was reported that the fifth episode of the fifth season would be titled "Shot All to Hell", and was to be directed by Adam Arkin and written by supervising producer Chris Provenzano.

=== Writing ===
Series developer Graham Yost described the episode, "it's an extraordinarily active episode. The next few episodes regroup, in a way. Stuff moves forward, but the big thing, especially in the next episode, is the aftermath of this one: the effect it has on Boyd to have Ava whisked away to a worser house of incarceration and then on Raylan for having stepped up and admitted to Art, in the best way he could, what Art already kinda knew. We had this idea that we wanted all three stories to reach a peak where everything is going great for everyone, and then it all falls apart in the matter of one act."

=== Casting ===
Alan Tudyk, who played Elias Marcos in the episode, is credited as "Wray Nerely". Yost said, "it's something that he's doing, sort of like a documentary or something, about the life of an actor in a character or something. I didn't spend time with him, so I don't exactly know what the thing is." Tudyk would later play a character named Wray Nerely on the web series Con Man.

== Reception ==
=== Viewers ===
In its original American broadcast, "Shot All to Hell" was seen by an estimated 2.39 million household viewers and gained a 0.9 ratings share among adults aged 18–49, according to Nielsen Media Research. This means that 0.9 percent of all households with televisions watched the episode. This was a slight increase in viewership from the previous episode, which was watched by 2.36 million viewers with a 0.8 in the 18-49 demographics.

=== Critical reviews ===
"Shot All to Hell" received critical acclaim. Seth Amitin of IGN gave the episode an "amazing" 9.2 out of 10 and wrote in his verdict, "This was the strongest episode of Justified's new season plot-wise, despite the episode itself not being quite as quick on its feet as 'The Kids Aren't All Right'. What 'Shot All To Hell' has that 'The Kids Aren't All Right' doesn't is a pretty keen sense of where the series is going, both for its characters and its series end. This is where Season 5 begins and it's looking good so far."

Alasdair Wilkins of The A.V. Club gave the episode an "A" grade and wrote, "This is the basic problem with criminal empires: It only takes one murderous psychopath who can't handle the occasional idle death threat to bring the whole thing crumbling down. As is so often the case with Justified, all this is going to get worse before it gets better — assuming any of this does get better." Kevin Fitzpatrick of Screen Crush wrote, "We'd been tough on Justified this season on account of its imminent season 6 end, and the overall sense that season 5 hadn't quite figured a way to connect its many pieces just yet. And much like last season's epic 'Decoy', sometimes Justified can deliver a crystallizing episode that truly kicks into high gear."

Alan Sepinwall of HitFix wrote, "A busy episode isn't inherently a great one, though. 'Shot All to Hell' had its great moments – pretty much everything involving Art, in particular – but a lot of it felt more like Justified clearing the decks of unsuccessful and/or extraneous characters and plotlines, in a way that feels more promising in terms of what's to come than in terms of what we got tonight." James Quealley of The Star-Ledger wrote, "All in all, I may have been a little down on the last two episodes for simply moving the pieces across the board. But when Justified reaches a payoff chapter like this one, it makes you feel like the ride was just fine in hindsight, and 'Shot All To Hell' did just that."

Joe Reid of Vulture gave the episode a perfect 5 star rating out of 5 and wrote, "How do you know you're watching a Justified episode that's action-packed even by Justified's standards? When a supporting character sums up everything that's happened — at the halfway point." Holly Anderson of Grantland wrote, "This is one of those hours that Justified does so well, in which all the carefully laid strands of the previous month's cat's-cradling are swept up and twisted and discarded or pulled taut into a new web for Raylan & Pals to scuttle across. It's not a new phenomenon; it's not even new for the show, but it is a cleansing purge for a crowded season roster, and a reminder of how richly patient viewing of those deliberate, sometimes sleepy setup hours can be rewarded."

Dan Forcella of TV Fanatic gave the episode a perfect 5 star rating out of 5 and wrote, "Justified has always excelled at using its Elmore Leonardian roots in telling stories of bad guys turning on each other. On 'Shot All to Hell', the series played that card perfectly on two different occasions - and in two very different fashions." Jack McKinney of Paste gave the episode a 9.6 out of 10 and wrote, "This damn season needs some medication. Keeping your audience guessing is one thing, displaying bipolar behavior is something else. Right now, Justified is leaning from the former toward the latter. But I can't worry about all that right now because I want to talk about how this was possibly the best episode of Justified ever. That's right, I said it. Ever."
