= Justified season 5 =

Justified
- Season 5
- Season 5 DVD cover
- No. of episodes: 13

Release
- Original network: FX
- Original release: January 7 – April 8, 2014

Season chronology
- ← Previous; Season 4 Next → Season 6

The fifth season of the American neo-Western television series Justified premiered on January 7, 2014, on FX, and concluded on April 8, 2014, consisting of 13 episodes. The series was developed by Graham Yost based on Elmore Leonard's novels Pronto and Riding the Rap and his short story "Fire in the Hole". Its main character is Raylan Givens, a deputy U.S. Marshal. Timothy Olyphant portrays Givens, a tough federal lawman, enforcing his own brand of justice in his Kentucky hometown. The series is set in the city of Lexington, Kentucky, and the hill country of eastern Kentucky, specifically in and around Harlan. The fifth season was released on DVD and Blu-ray in region 1 on December 2, 2014.

== Cast and characters ==
=== Main ===
- Timothy Olyphant as Raylan Givens, a suave deputy U.S. marshal who becomes tangled up with the Crowe family when they move to Harlan.
- Nick Searcy as Art Mullen, the chief deputy of Lexington's marshals office whose relationship with Raylan frays.
- Jere Burns as Wynn Duffy, a volatile and dangerous Dixie Mafia enforcer who goes into business moving heroin with Boyd.
- Joelle Carter as Ava Crowder, Boyd's fiancée who is imprisoned after a murder she committed is discovered.
- Jacob Pitts as Tim Gutterson, a Lexington deputy marshal.
- Erica Tazel as Rachel Brooks, a Lexington deputy marshal.
- Walton Goggins as Boyd Crowder, Raylan's intelligent nemesis who is split between trying to get Ava out of prison and selling heroin in Harlan.

=== Recurring ===
- Michael Rapaport as Darryl Crowe, Jr., the scheming, hot-tempered patriarch of the Floridian Crowes.
- Jesse Luken as Jimmy Tolan, Boyd's henchman.
- Damon Herriman as Dewey Crowe, a dim-witted criminal who is visited by his cousins from Florida when he comes into a large sum of money.
- Jacob Lofland as Kendal Crowe, Daryl's teenage brother whose lineage is somewhat of a mystery.
- Justin Welborn as Carl Lennon, Boyd's henchman.
- Alicia Witt as Wendy Crowe, Daryl's paralegal sister who he often uses to get the family out of trouble.
- A. J. Buckley as Danny Crowe, Daryl's dim-witted and violent younger brother.
- Jonathan Kowalsky as Mike Cosmatopolis, Duffy's bodyguard.
- Amy Smart as Alison Brander, a social worker who becomes involved with both Raylan and the Crowes.
- Rick Gomez as David Vasquez, an assistant U.S. attorney.
- John Kapelos as Ethan Picker, a Detroit Mob man who reluctantly does business with Boyd and Duffy.
- Don McManus as Billy "Wildman" Geist, Ava's lawyer.
- Danielle Panabaker as Penny Cole, an inmate who befriends Ava.
- Sam Anderson as Lee Paxton, a powerful funeral home director that Boyd has a vendetta against.
- Justin Huen as Alberto Ruiz, a sadistic and dangerous representative of a Mexican cartel who monitors Boyd and Duffy.
- Mickey Jones as Rodney "Hot Rod" Dunham, the leader of a Memphis drug gang who begins working with Johnny.
- Karolina Wydra as Mara Paxton, Paxton's scheming trophy wife.
- Dale Dickey as Judith, the leader of a religious prison gang who moves heroin and recruits Ava.
- Edi Gathegi as Jean Baptiste, a Haitian alligator hunter and criminal who works with the Crowe family.
- Steve Harris as Roscoe, an enforcer for Hot Rod and Jay's brother.
- Wood Harris as Jay, an enforcer for Hot Rod and Roscoe's brother.
- William Gregory Lee as Nick Mooney, Harlan's sheriff who works for Paxton
- James LeGros as Wade Messer, a criminal who works as a bartender for Dewey and gets in over his head.
- Shashawnee Hall as Ed Kirkland, the chief deputy of Detroit's U.S. marshals office and a friend of Art's.
- Deidrie Henry as Rowena, a prison nurse that goes into business with Ava.
- David Meunier as Johnny Crowder, Boyd's cousin who turns to Hot Rod to defeat him.
- Will Sasso as Al Sura, a Canadian mob representative that gets involved with the marshals against his will.
- Mary Steenburgen as Katherine Hale, the widow of Duffy's mentor who he asks for help regarding dealing with Boyd.
- Danny Strong as Albert Fekus, a Harlan county prison guard who develops an unhealthy obsession with Ava.
- Bill Tangradi as Cyrus Boone, a drug runner working for Boyd and Duffy with shifty loyalties.
- Arriane Alexander as Susan Crane, a Harlan county prison guard that keeps watch over Ava.
- Jeannetta Arnette as Marsha Keyhoe, Dewey's lawyer.
- Xander Berkeley as Charles Monroe, a Detroit accountant who becomes desperate after losing his assets to the marshals.
- Gabrielle Dennis as Gloria, Monroe's maid and lover.
- James Kyson as Yoon, a Mexican cartel representative who negotiates with both Boyd and Johnny.
- Leslie Riley as Leslie Mullen, Art's wife.
- Stephen Root as Mike Reardon, an eccentric and harsh judge.
- Natalie Zea as Winona Hawkins, Raylan's ex-wife who lives in Miami with their infant daughter.

=== Guest ===
- Adam Arkin as Theo Tonin, the former head of the Detroit Mob who seeks revenge after a murder.
- Jeremy Davies as Dickie Bennett, the last of the criminal Bennett family who is left paraplegic after being shot by Raylan.
- Kaitlyn Dever as Loretta McCready, a teenage associate of Raylan's who has begun selling marijuana to Hot Rod.
- Max Perlich as Sammy Tonin, the head of the Detroit Mob who is in debt to a group of Canadian criminals.
- Eric Roberts as Alex Miller, a Memphis DEA agent who has a long history with Hot Rod.

== Production ==
On March 28, 2013, FX renewed Justified for a fifth season, which premiered on January 7, 2014.

=== Casting ===
Jere Burns, who has recurred throughout the first four seasons as Wynn Duffy was made a series regular.

=== Filming ===
Episodes were shot in California. The small town of Green Valley, California often doubles for Harlan, Kentucky.

== Episodes ==
No. overall	No. in season	Title	Directed by	Written by	Original release date	US viewers (millions)
53	1	"A Murder of Crowes"	Michael Dinner	Graham Yost & Fred Golan	January 7, 2014	2.84
Dewey Crowe (Note: A dim-witted criminal previously associated with Boyd, first seen in "Fire in the Hole".) is released from prison and wins $300,000 in a police brutality lawsuit against Raylan, which he uses to buy Audrey's. Dewey's Floridian cousin Dilly kills a USCG officer, so Raylan partners with Miami deputy marshal Greg Sutter. Dilly's brother Daryl Jr. offers to give Raylan their associate Elvis Machado to avoid criminal charges. He makes his brother Danny kill Dilly for his recklessness, while Elvis, being driven to a setup by Daryl's sister Wendy, suspects something is off and flees. Raylan and Sutter kill him when he pulls a gun on them. Raylan calls Winona and their newborn daughter Willa upon returning to Kentucky, not revealing he was in Miami despite them living there. After killing Detroit men who try to rob him during a heroin deal, Boyd meets with Sammy Tonin, witnessing Ethan Picker kill him on orders from the Canadian mob Sammy was in debt to. Boyd convinces the Canadians to do business with him and Picker. He brutalizes Lee Paxton (Note: A funeral home director with a vendetta against Boyd, first seen in "Money Trap".) when he refuses to free Ava from prison, which his wife Mara witnesses. Boyd offers to buy her silence.
54	2	"The Kids Aren't All Right"	Bill Johnson	Dave Andron	January 14, 2014	2.23
Raylan arrests Detroit accountant Charles Monroe. Loretta McCready (Note: A teenage girl previously involved with Harlan's criminal Bennett family, first seen in "The Moonshine War".) and her boyfriend Derrick Waters short Hot Rod Dunham (Note: The head of a Memphis gang, first seen in "Full Commitment".) in a marijuana deal, so he sends sibling enforcers Jay and Roscoe to collect. Loretta begs Raylan to rescue Derrick when he is kidnapped, so Raylan saves him, trading the brothers back to Hot Rod on the condition that he leaves Harlan. He realizes that Loretta manipulated him into saving Derrick, and later meets with her social worker Alison Brander at Monroe's mansion. Art learns that Sammy contacted Raylan before he died, so he calls Detroit chief deputy Ed Kirkland and asks where Sammy was the night Nick Augustine was killed. (Note: As depicted in "Ghosts".) Mara agrees to take Boyd's payout, only to agree to testify against him when Nick Mooney (Note: Harlan's new sheriff, first seen in "The Spoil".) strong-arms her. Boyd's dealer Cyrus Boone is approached by Teri and mentions an incoming shipment, which Boyd later finds hijacked.
55	3	"Good Intentions"	Dean Parisot	Benjamin Cavell	January 21, 2014	2.50
Boyd and Duffy torture Cyrus until he identifies Teri. A man shows up to the mansion to harass Alison, making Monroe paranoid when Raylan asks if he was involved. Monroe tries to kill his maid, then sends her to get gold from the mansion. Raylan intercepts her and has her claim Duffy, who installed Monroe's safe, stole the gold, and he attacks Duffy and is shot by his bodyguard Mike Cosmatopolis. Paxton orders Mooney to kill Boyd, who instead hires him. The Crowes come to Harlan and Daryl discovers that Wade Messer, (Note: A local petty criminal, first seen in "Bloody Harlan".) under Dewey's employ, stole from him on orders from Boyd. Boyd's henchman Carl Lennon brings him Teri. He calls a number on her phone and Johnny Crowder answers.
56	4	"Over the Mountain"	Gwyneth Horder-Payton	Taylor Elmore	January 28, 2014	2.36
At Daryl's urging, Dewey takes Messer into the woods and shoots him, but he escapes. Dewey pursues him for hours and finds him badly wounded, ultimately leaving him to die. Carl discovers Johnny is working with Hot Rod. Mooney fakes Boyd's death with a corpse from Paxton's morgue. Guard Albert Fekus tries to rape Ava in prison, but she is rescued by another guard. Art meets with Canadian Al Sura, who tells him a Kentucky lawman allowed Augustine to be killed and that Picker knows about it. After learning Messer was an informant, Raylan gets his phone number from Boyd and uses it to find his corpse. He uses Alison to take Daryl's teenage brother Kendal into state custody when the family refuses to leave Harlan.
57	5	"Shot All to Hell"	Adam Arkin	Chris Provenzano	February 4, 2014	2.39
Boyd kills Paxton, staging it as suicide. He has a dying miner kill Mooney and pays him with Mara's money, warning her to never return to Harlan. Ava's case is void with Paxton and Mooney dead, but Fekus stabs himself with a planted shiv and frames her, getting her transferred to a state prison. Boyd outbids Johnny for Hot Rod's partnership, so Johnny pays Hot Rod's men to turn on him. Wendy comes to Harlan to take custody of Kendal. Danny kills a family friend during an argument about groceries. Tonin's consigliere Elias Marcos tortures and kills Sura for Picker's location. Raylan leans on Picker for Marcos's location and warns him to stay quiet about Augustine. He kills Marcos and arrests Theo Tonin, who was waiting nearby for Marcos to bring Picker to him. Raylan and Art learn that Picker implicated Jerry Barkley (Note: A deceased, corrupt FBI agent, first seen in "The Man Behind the Curtain".) as the man who let Augustine die, only for Raylan to confess the truth to Art.
58	6	"Kill the Messenger"	Don Kurt	Ingrid Escajeda	February 11, 2014	2.33
Art hits Raylan after he confesses. Boyd asks a white supremacist to have his gang leader sister Gretchen Swift keep Ava safe, but Gretchen attacks her due to Boyd abandoning white supremacy. Danny attacks Alison when she checks on Kendal. Dewey plans to kidnap and ransom Boyd, but winds up taking Carl instead. Raylan tracks Danny down and finds him beating Carl, but they bluff it off as a consensual sex encounter. Raylan refuses to answer Rachel's questions about the bruise on his face. After meeting with a Mexican cartel representative about running heroin, Boyd employs Daryl to brutalize Gretchen's brother. He realizes while calling Hot Rod that he is in trouble, and offers Daryl more money to help kill Johnny.
59	7	"Raw Deal"	Bill Johnson	VJ Boyd	February 25, 2014	2.10
A man has the money he fed into a backgammon website stolen. He and a debt collector confront T.C. Fleming, the hacker who stole from him, only for the collector to kill the man and take T.C.'s girlfriend hostage. T.C. escapes when Raylan arrives, redirecting his cell signal to lead the marshals to the collector, though she gives T.C. up. With Art unwilling to talk to him, Raylan submits a transfer request for Miami. Disturbed by watching Danny kill their friend and unable to talk to Wendy, Kendal calls his uncle, Jack Anderson. Inmate Penny Cole introduces Ava to gang leader and heroin runner Judith, who orders her to have sex with a guard to aid in trafficking. She instead plants heroin on the guard to avoid this. Johnny and Boyd go to Mexico separately to meet with the cartel, where Johnny outbids him and plans to kill him after crossing the border. The Crowes save Boyd but kill Hot Rod's men before they return to the U.S., and Boyd kills Johnny when he mocks them.
60	8	"Whistle Past the Graveyard"	Peter Werner	Chris Provenzano	March 4, 2014	2.32
Cartel man Alberto Ruiz orders Boyd to take care of the bodies and tells him their business is over. They load the bodies into the back of their truck, only for PF officers to steal it, believing it has Johnny's heroin. They meet with associates of Daryl's who agree to move the drugs over the border, though Jimmy Tolan, fluent in Spanish, hears them mention that Daryl set the situation up. Judith orders Ava to get her heroin, so she seeks help from a prison nurse. Before Raylan can go to Florida with Alison to see Willa, Kendal runs away to see Jack. Wendy asks Raylan for help when Michael, a man looking for Jack, approaches her. As Kendal reveals to Jack that he knows he and Wendy are his parents, Michael arrives and Jack flees, leaving Kendal behind. Raylan hunts down and arrests both men, learning that Jack brutalized Michael's son after he was caught cheating him out of money. Empathizing with Kendal's tough home life, Raylan gives him the money he was using to go to Florida, while Alison, upset by how he used her against the Crowes, leaves him.
61	9	"Wrong Roads"	Michael Dinner	Dave Andron & Leonard Chang	March 11, 2014	2.24
Raylan goes to Memphis to find Hot Rod after learning of Johnny's death, and is partnered with his handler, DEA agent Alex Miller. They find him dying of a gunshot after killing the man who was guarding him, while Jay and Roscoe go to Harlan to kill Boyd. They burst into one of Boyd's meetings, but Raylan and Miller arrive, shooting Roscoe and arresting them both. Daryl finds Raylan's money and Kendal claims he stole it, so Daryl confiscates it. The nurse orders Boyd to kill the man who killed her smuggling partner, which he has Jimmy do. She then orders Ava to kill Judith. Danny and Dewey are pulled over by Miller while running heroin. The former attempts to fight him, only for Dewey, fed up with his cousins' antics, to drive off with the drugs.
62	10	"Weight"	John Dahl	Taylor Elmore & Keith Schreier	March 18, 2014	2.04
Danny's Stafford is killed by a car. Knowing that killing Judith will increase her sentence if caught, Ava breaks off her engagement with Boyd. She tries to cut a deal with Judith when alone but is attacked, forcing Ava to kill her instead. Boyd fails to get Fekus to recant his statement. Raylan calls Dewey to convince him to turn himself in, inspiring him to go to Dickie Bennett, (Note: The surviving member of the criminal Bennett family and a friend of Dewey's, first seen in "The Moonshine War".) who now uses a wheelchair after being shot by Raylan. (Note: As depicted in "Coalition".) Dickie refuses to give him up to Raylan, while Dewey tries to sell the drugs to Cyrus, who gives them back to the Crowes. Raylan finds Danny burying the dog and Danny decides to kill him, only to trip into the dog's grave and stab himself in the throat. Seeing that his business with Boyd and Picker is going poorly, Duffy brings in Katherine Hale, the widow of his mentor, for help.
63	11	"The Toll"	Jon Avnet	Benjamin Cavell	March 25, 2014	2.05
Knowing that Alison needs protection after Danny's death, Art gets her set up in a hotel room, only for someone to shoot him through the door. Kirkland takes over as temporary chief and questions Theo. He blames Picker for the shooting, but Tim finds evidence that exonerates him. Picker meets with Boyd and Duffy about their heroin trade and tries to have Boyd killed, only for Boyd to kill him with a pack of explosives-laced cigarettes and offer Duffy a larger cut of the profits to keep in business. Kendal confesses to shooting Art, claiming he thought that Raylan was behind the door, wanting to take revenge for Danny. Kirkland tells Rachel that Art named her as his successor, while Raylan confronts Daryl and deduces that he shot Art, promising revenge.
64	12	"Starvation"	Michael Pressman	Chris Provenzano	April 1, 2014	2.04
Daryl pressures Carl into giving up the rest of Boyd's heroin. He forces Wendy to get it for him, but she is arrested by Raylan. Ava refuses Raylan's request to have Boyd find Daryl, while Boyd tries to bargain for immunity if he can get Daryl to confess. Dewey's car breaks down, so he busts into a meeting between Boyd and Daryl, boasting about killing Messer before taking the heroin. The marshals arrest him and Daryl, having heard everything through Boyd's wire. Penny is killed by a member of Gretchen's gang and Gretchen sells the woman out, which she blames on Ava. Ava agrees to help Raylan, only to learn that Boyd is cooperating. Daryl's lawyer gets him released on lack of evidence, nullifying Boyd's deal. Boyd reveals Raylan's role in Augustine's death to Tim and Rachel, though they are skeptical. He calls Jimmy and tells him to meet him with the heroin, unaware that Alberto has captured him. Raylan successfully pushes for Kendal to be given a lengthy prison sentence.
65	13	"Restitution"	Adam Arkin	Fred Golan & Dave Andron	April 8, 2014	2.37
Alberto has Jimmy killed and orders Boyd to bring him Daryl. Boyd changes Raylan's name to Daryl's in his phone to fool them and sets up a meeting, where Rachel and Tim arrive, killing Alberto and his men. Raylan has Wendy observe him interrogating Kendal, where she realizes he did not shoot Art. She informs Daryl of her supposed plan to sue the marshals. They meet and she manipulates him into confessing, which she reveals she recorded before drawing a gun. As Raylan watches, she kills Daryl when he tries to disarm her. Raylan informs Art of what happened when he wakes up, who thanks him for avenging him. He tells Raylan that his transfer request cleared, and Raylan promises Winona he will move south for good. Rachel and David Vasquez (Note: An assistant US attorney, first seen in "The Lord of War and Thunder".) inform him that they are building a RICO case against Boyd. Boyd learns that Fekus recanted his statement, getting Ava released from prison, and Katherine offers him bank robbery work. Raylan meets with Ava, actually released to help with the RICO case. She admits her fear, and he promises that "everything's gonna be fine."

== Reception ==
=== Reviews ===
On Rotten Tomatoes, the season has an approval rating of 96% with an average score of 8 out of 10 based on 28 reviews. The website's critical consensus reads, "Justified continues to bring the shock value with clever storylines and a potent blend of comedy and drama." On Metacritic, the season has a weighted average score of 84 out of 100, based on 14 critics, indicating "universal acclaim".

=== Accolades ===
Walton Goggins received a nomination for Best Supporting Actor in a Drama Series for the 4th Critics' Choice Television Awards. Production designer Dave Blass, art director Oana Bogdan and decorator Shauna Aronson were nominated for the Primetime Emmy Award for Outstanding Art Direction for a Contemporary or Fantasy Series (Single-Camera) for the episode "A Murder of Crowes".
