= Weight (Justified) =

- Justified episode
- Episode no.: Season 5 Episode 10
- Directed by: John Dahl
- Written by: Taylor Elmore & Keith Schreier
- Cinematography by: Francis Kenny
- Editing by: Dorian Harris & Steven Nevius
- Original air date: March 18, 2014
- Running time: 51 minutes

Guest appearances
- Michael Rapaport as Daryl Crowe Jr.; Jeremy Davies as Dickie Bennett; A. J. Buckley as Danny Crowe; Dale Dickey as Judith; Damon Herriman as Dewey Crowe; John Kapelos as Picker; Jacob Lofland as Kendal Crowe; Jesse Luken as Jimmy Tolan; Danielle Panabaker as Penny; Amy Smart as Alison Brander; Danny Strong as Albert Fekus; Bill Tangradi as Cyrus; Alicia Witt as Wendy Crowe; Mary Steenburgen as Katherine Hale

Episode chronology
← Previous "Whistle Past the Graveyard"	Next → "The Toll"
- Justified (season 5)

"Weight" is the tenth episode of the fifth season of the American Neo-Western television series Justified. It is the 62nd overall episode of the series and was written by co-executive producer Taylor Elmore and Keith Schreier and directed by John Dahl. It originally aired on FX on March 18, 2014.

The series is based on Elmore Leonard's stories about the character Raylan Givens, particularly "Fire in the Hole", which serves as the basis for the episode. The series follows Raylan Givens, a tough deputy U.S. Marshal enforcing his own brand of justice. The series revolves around the inhabitants and culture in the Appalachian Mountains area of eastern Kentucky, specifically Harlan County where many of the main characters grew up. In the episode, Raylan and Boyd collide on the hunt for Dewey Crowe, while bad blood simmering in the Crowe family finally boils over.

According to Nielsen Media Research, the episode was seen by an estimated 2.04 million household viewers and gained a 0.7 ratings share among adults aged 18–49. The episode received positive reviews from critics, who praised the directing, fast pace on the episode and humor.

== Plot ==
Kendal (Jacob Lofland) accidentally allows the family dog to cross the street and be hit by a truck. Meanwhile, Dewey (Damon Herriman) talks on the phone while unhooking his car from the tow truck, accidentally causing the car to roll and crash nearby. Dewey takes the drugs and leaves the scene. Danny (A. J. Buckley) makes his way home and tells Daryl (Michael Rapaport) that they have a problem.

Boyd (Walton Goggins) visits Ava (Joelle Carter) in prison, telling her he has been investigating Fekus (Danny Strong) for his fake attack. However, Ava tells him to stop investigating and to stop visiting her for their own safety, confusing Boyd. At the bar, Daryl talks with Boyd about their problem when Dewey calls them. Dewey has the drugs and demands the $250,000 that Boyd scammed from him when he bought the bar. Boyd accepts to his terms but reprimands Daryl for letting all of this happen. Danny and Darryl start collecting fake money to deliver to Dewey and trick him, when Raylan (Timothy Olyphant) appears looking for Dewey, attacks Darryl and takes the briefcase with fake money.

Raylan contacts Dewey through a prostitute's phone. He tells him that Boyd and the Crowes will go looking for him, offering to help him. Dewey declines his help and tosses his phone through the window. Dewey then uses a fake ID to visit Dickie Bennett (Jeremy Davies) in prison, offering him a partnership, which he accepts to do. Raylan also visits Dickie, who refuses to divulge Dewey's location unless he is given a transference to another prison. In prison, Ava intends to kill Judith (Dale Dickey) as Rowena instructed her to do, when Penny (Danielle Panabaker) interrupts as they're checking their cells.

Alison (Amy Smart) returns home and finds Kendal inside. Although Kendal does not want to return with his family, Alison calls Wendy (Alicia Witt) to pick him up. Dewey meets with Cyrus (Bill Tangradi) to work on their business when Cyrus betrays him for Daryl, alerting him of their location. Back at Audrey’s, Kendal and Wendy appear and Danny is furious upon discovering that Kendal allowed his dog to leave and get hit by the truck. This causes a fight, in which Kendal reveals that Danny killed Jean Baptiste, surprising Daryl as he thought he was in Florida. Meanwhile, Duffy (Jere Burns) meets with Katherine Hale (Mary Steenburgen), the widow of his former mentor. He pays her $50,000 to help with their problems.

Danny finds Dewey at Cyrus' house and confronts him about the drugs. The situation soon turns into a Mexican standoff, in which Cyrus gives Danny the heroin, minus keeping three bricks for himself, and gives Dewey a 2-minute headstart to run as Danny will go find him. Danny returns to his yard and grieves over his dog's corpse when Raylan appears. Raylan offers him a chance of being the only one arrested, because if Danny takes his bag near the bag, Raylan will have to arrest Wendy and Kendal. Danny then suggests they do "the 21-foot drill" and he runs towards Raylan with a knife when he suddenly drops into a hole that Kendal had been ordered to dig to bury the dog. Danny accidentally stabs himself with the knife at the throat and he dies in front of Raylan.

When talking with Art (Nick Searcy), Raylan fails to convince him that he wasn't involved in Danny's death and is also refused permission to protect Alison as the Crowes will want retaliation. In prison, Penny, who has been forced to sleep with multiple guards by Judith and gotten pregnant more than once, supplies Ava with a better knife. Ava confronts Judith at the prison chapel, but Judith reveals she knows her intentions. Ava tries to suggest working together against Rowena but Judith expresses skepticism that she will never try to kill her and attacks her. This forces Ava to take the knife and kill Judith by stabbing her multiple times.

Boyd has captured Fekus after having him meet with a woman hired by Boyd. Before Boyd kills him, Fekus states that he only hurt himself because he loves Ava. This surprisingly gets Boyd to release Fekus instead of killing him. At the Crowe house, Daryl and Wendy have a discussion which soon turns into a brutal fight, ending when Daryl brutally wounds her. He then visits Kendal in his room, telling him he needs to choose whether to be "Crowe or not". Kendal chooses the former and Daryl makes a blood oath between them.

== Production ==
=== Development ===
In February 2014, it was reported that the tenth episode of the fifth season would be titled "Weight", and was to be directed by John Dahl and written by co-executive producer Taylor Elmore and Keith Schreier.

=== Writing ===
Danny Crowe's death was pitched by star Timothy Olyphant. Series developer Graham Yost said, "he wanted the dog to die. He wanted a grave to be dug. And he wanted Danny to fall in it. And it's suggested by something in Out of Sight, one of the great Elmore Leonard film adaptations. There's a scene in the climax where this character named White Boy Bob is running up the stairs with a gun, and he trips and falls and shoots himself in the head. It's actually not in Elmore's book, I don't think. It was something that was suggested by someone on the set. But it felt very Elmore, and we've always loved that moment. So it's a little bit of our tribute to White Boy Bob." Danny's actor, A. J. Buckley was notified of his character's death before starting working on the episode while he was guest starring on Supernatural. He said, "if there was ever a way to die on a show and go out, this was it."

=== Casting ===
Despite being credited, Jacob Pitts and Erica Tazel do not appear in the episode as their respective characters.

The episode marked Jeremy Davies's first appearance in the series since "Coalition". Although Yost wanted his appearance to remain a secret, FX gave away his appearance on promotional material. Dewey's fake ID, Parker Stevenson, was based on Parker Stevenson, star of The Hardy Boys/Nancy Drew Mysteries, as Yost considers himself a fan of the series.

In January 2014, it was reported that Mary Steenburgen was joining the series in a recurring role as Katherine Hale, "a beautiful, Southern belle who was the wife of Wynn Duffy's mentor in crime."

== Reception ==
=== Viewers ===
In its original American broadcast, "Weight" was seen by an estimated 2.04 million household viewers and gained a 0.7 ratings share among adults aged 18–49, according to Nielsen Media Research. This means that 0.7 percent of all households with televisions watched the episode. This was a 9% decrease in viewership from the previous episode, which was watched by 2.24 million viewers with a 0.8 in the 18-49 demographics.

=== Critical reviews ===
"Weight" received positive reviews from critics. Seth Amitin of IGN gave the episode a "great" 8.2 out of 10 and wrote in his verdict, "All in all, 'Weight' led us toward a very good ending for Season 5. Boyd is in trouble with everyone. Ava is struggling to keep her head above water. Dewey is somehow still alive. Raylan is still in Art's doghouse. But the question remains: does anyone want to see this to the end?"

Alasdair Wilkins of The A.V. Club gave the episode an "A−" grade and wrote, "As a general rule, Justified builds its seasons from the top down, with the actions of a powerful but ultimately vulnerable main villain driving each season's endgame. This year, on the other hand, has been an attempt to build the serialized story from the bottom up. 'Weight' builds on the success of last week's 'Wrong Roads' by starting to bring this season into tighter focus, as tonight's episode suggests just how lost Boyd and Raylan have become." Kevin Fitzpatrick of Screen Crush wrote, "'Weight' lacks a more effective punch with its guest stars, somewhat meaninglessly returning Dickie Bennett to prominence, though it at least caught our attention with Mary Steenburgen's introduction as Wynn Duffy’s new friend."

Alan Sepinwall of HitFix wrote, "'Weight' really didn't do anything to improve the many problematic areas of season 5 – other than killing off Danny Crowe, in one of the season's best scenes – but the parts around the parts that aren't working were kind of terrific." James Quealley of The Star-Ledger wrote, "The Crowe family has some serious problems this week, but where those start and finish has a lot to do with what winds up as another uneven episode of Justified."

Matt Zoller Seitz of Vulture gave the episode a perfect 5 star rating out of 5 and wrote, "'Weight' was the best episode of Justified's fifth season, partly because Taylor Elmore and Keith Schreier's script resolved so many lingering subplots in dramatically perfect ways, but also because it was directed by John Dahl." Holly Anderson of Grantland wrote, "This week's Raylan-Art scene kind of turned us around on whether drawing out this feud is working. The repetition, looking back, makes it work."

Carla Day of TV Fanatic gave the episode a 4.5 star rating out of 5 and wrote, "There wasn't any light or happiness in the hour at all. It's sad when the only laugh comes from someone's death. And, what's worse is that it's going to go downhill from here. The Crowes are going to retaliate against Raylan and Allison is a likely target. There's only 3 episodes left in Justified season 5. I really hope that things turn around to let a little happiness in." Jack McKinney of Paste gave the episode a 9 out of 10 and wrote, "Overall, this was a very good episode but not a great one. There were significant chunks of mediocrity, but the strong scenes were good enough to bring the average way up."
