= A Murder of Crowes =

- Justified episode
- Episode no.: Season 5 Episode 1
- Directed by: Michael Dinner
- Written by: Graham Yost & Fred Golan
- Cinematography by: Francis Kenny
- Editing by: Steve Polivka
- Original air date: January 7, 2014
- Running time: 49 minutes

Guest appearances
- Michael Rapaport as Daryl Crowe Jr.; James LeGros as Wade Messer; Edi Gathegi as Jean Baptiste; Sam Anderson as Lee Paxton; A. J. Buckley as Danny Crowe; Matt Craven as Dan Grant; Dave Foley as Canadian Gangster; Rick Gomez as AUSA David Vasquez; Jason Gray-Stanford as Dylan "Dyllie" Crowe; Damon Herriman as Dewey Crowe; John Kapelos as Picker; David Koechner as Deputy Greg Sutter; Jacob Lofland as Kendal Crowe; Jesse Luken as Jimmy Tolan; Don McManus as The Wildman; Amaury Nolasco as Elvis Machado; Max Perlich as Sammy Tonin; Stephen Root as Judge Mike Reardon; Will Sasso as Al Sura; Alicia Witt as Wendy Crowe; Karolina Wydra as Mara Paxton; Ron Yuan as Simon Lee; Jeannetta Arnette as Marsha Keyhoe; Justin Welborn as Carl; Natalie Zea as Winona Hawkins

Episode chronology
← Previous "Ghosts"	Next → "The Kids Aren't All Right"
- Justified (season 5)

"A Murder of Crowes" is the first episode of the fifth season of the American Neo-Western television series Justified. It is the 53rd overall episode of the series and was written by series developer Graham Yost and executive producer Fred Golan and directed by executive producer Michael Dinner. It originally aired on FX on January 7, 2014.

The series is based on Elmore Leonard's stories about the character Raylan Givens, particularly "Fire in the Hole", which serves as the basis for the episode. The series follows Raylan Givens, a tough deputy U.S. Marshal enforcing his own brand of justice. The series revolves around the inhabitants and culture in the Appalachian Mountains area of eastern Kentucky, specifically Harlan County where many of the main characters grew up. In the episode, the Crowe family in Florida is introduced to Raylan, and the family plays a pivotal role in his life.

According to Nielsen Media Research, the episode was seen by an estimated 2.84 million household viewers and gained a 1.1 ratings share among adults aged 18–49. The episode received generally positive reviews from critics, who praised the episode as a tribute to Elmore Leonard, although some critics expressed criticism at the lack of character development, plot movement, and needlessly over-crowded cast members. Michael Rapaport's acting in the episode also attracted a mixed response.

== Plot ==
Raylan (Timothy Olyphant) testifies in court in a lawsuit filed by Dewey Crowe (Damon Herriman), who could be released from prison as he was forced to break out of prison. Judge Reardon (Stephen Root) agrees to release Dewey and awards him $300,000 in compensation, much to his shock.

Boyd (Walton Goggins) meets with Ava (Joelle Carter) in prison, telling her that he hasn't had luck in finding an appropriate, lawyer for her case. Later that night, Boyd, Jimmy (Jesse Luken) and Carl (Justin Welborn) meet with Detroit criminals, who attempt to scam them. They execute the criminals but Boyd is shot in the ear and the shipment is nowhere to be found. Boyd calls Duffy (Jere Burns) to tell him that they need to go to Detroit.

In Florida, Dewey's cousin, Dylan "Dyllie" Crowe (Jason Gray-Stanford) and Elvis Machado (Amaury Nolasco) meet with corrupt Coast Guard officer Simon Lee (Ron Yuan) to pay for his help in moving contraband. However, when Dyllie is short of money, they kill Lee.

As he is associated with Dewey, Art (Nick Searcy) sends Raylan to Florida to investigate Lee's disappearance. Before going to Florida, Raylan visits Dewey, who now owns Audrey's. Dewey denies being involved in Lee's disappearance and warns Raylan to stay away from the Crowes in Florida.

In Florida, Raylan meets with Dan Grant (Matt Craven) and his partner, Deputy Greg Sutter (David Koechner). After investigating Elvis, they recognize Daryl Crowe Jr. (Michael Rapaport) as a person of interest.

In an undisclosed location, Dyllie and Elvis tell Daryl about the incident with Lee. Angry that they are now in trouble with the federal authorities, Daryl orders them to dispose of the body.

Boyd and Duffy go to Detroit and meet with Sammy Tonin (Max Perlich) about problems with their drugs and money. However, Sammy's henchman, Picker (John Kapelos), suddenly kills Sammy and orders Boyd and Duffy to hand over their money.

Picker reveals that Sammy owed money to Canadian criminal bosses who agreed to spare Picker if he agrees to kill Sammy and give them money. Boyd and Duffy confront the Canadians, who offer to ship them more drugs as compensation.

Raylan and Sutter question gator hunter Jean Baptiste (Edi Gathegi) about his possible connection to Daryl and Elvis but he claims not to know Elvis. After they leave, Baptiste calls Daryl to warn him about them. While dining, Raylan and Sutter are approached by Wendy Crowe (Alicia Witt), Daryl's sister as well as his lawyer, who suggests a deal to help her brother stay out of prison. When they accept the deal, Daryl visits them and agrees to hand them Elvis or face criminal charges. Daryl tells Elvis he will cut ties with him, but Elvis demands $20,000 for his services, which Daryl agrees to provide.

As Wendy leaves a hotel room with Elvis, Daryl orders his brother Danny (A. J. Buckley) to kill Dyllie for his reckless behavior. While Wendy is driving, Elvis deduces the plan and orders her to reroute the car. Wendy drives to the city and purposely crashes the car so she can escape. Elvis then goes to the docks to escape to Cuba on a small boat, but Raylan and Sutter find him. Elvis prepares to shoot them, but they are faster, and they kill Elvis. The next day, Raylan informs Daryl that his deal includes a pardon. After they leave, Daryl complains to Baptiste that Florida means nothing (sic) as Dyllie is dead, Wendy has left town and his business is failing. Baptiste then suggests that Daryl move to Kentucky.

Once back in Kentucky, Raylan video-chats with Winona (Natalie Zea) and their newly-born daughter. Raylan does not reveal that he was in Florida. Boyd visits Lee Paxton (Sam Anderson) to pay him to help Ava get released from prison. Paxton taunts Boyd, even offering him a deal to have the witnesses change their testimony so that Boyd is sent to prison in exchange for Ava. Boyd loses his temper and brutally attacks Paxton. Paxton's trophy wife, Mara (Karolina Wydra) witnesses the attack after which Boyd offers her the money he originally wanted to give to Paxton in exchange for her silence. After Boyd leaves, Mara tends to her husband.

== Production ==
=== Development ===
In March 2013, FX renewed Justified for a fifth season. In December 2013, it was reported that the first episode of the fifth season would be titled "A Murder of Crowes", and was to be directed by executive producer Michael Dinner and written by series developer Graham Yost and executive producer Fred Golan.

=== Writing ===
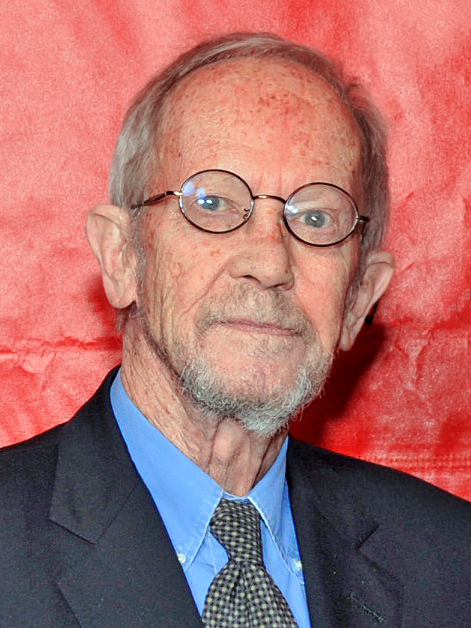
The episode was the first to be filmed following executive producer and author Elmore Leonard's death in August 2013.

In September 2013, it was reported that the season's main antagonists would be "the white trash Florida-based Crowe clan, led by the sexy, charismatic and ruthless fortysomething patriarch Dale. Officially, the Crowes run a gator farm. Unofficially, they deal drugs and murder people and stuff. Dale's inner circle includes sister Wendy (the public face of the family) and younger brother Danny (described as a romantic sociopath)."

On comparisons between the Crowe family to the Bennett family, series developer Graham Yost said, "we'll all on this show live in the shadow of the Bennetts because that really worked well for us. So, we have to try to figure out how to do it in a different way and have it mean something else. Part of the inspiration of going with the Crowes was that we had a lot of fun in the second episode last year with the Truth family. That was inspired to a degree by the documentary The Wild and Wonderful Whites of West Virginia. The Bennetts were a little different. First of all, the Bennetts were for generations ensconced in Eastern Kentucky. The Crowes are interlopers, sort of invasive, and so we wanted to play with that as well."

Elvis Machado's name was a result of Yost searching on Google for "popular male Cuban names", which brought up Elvis Manuel. Regarding his death scene, Yost said, "Then it just became a question of, should that be the end of the scene? Or do we go to guns coming out and Elvis getting shot? We debated that. We wanted more punctuation, so we went the way we did."

As production began on the episode, Walton Goggins teased his role in the episode, "I filmed a scene [for the season premiere] until almost 1 a.m. that has permanently altered the way that I see Boyd Crowder. I'm as excited about it and scared by it as I've ever been, as an actor. But it's done and that's what it is. Boyd will have to deal with that emotion." The scene where Boyd visits Ava in prison and asks the lawyer to use headphones so he doesn't listen was inspired by Breaking Bad. On Boyd's ear wound, Yost explained, "we wanted to show that this is a tough, tough time for Boyd Crowder, both with work and with Ava." The episode marked the first appearance of recurring character Carl. The character was created as Jesse Luken, who plays Jimmy Tolan in the series, had a recurring role on Star-Crossed and producers worried they wouldn't have the character in every episode.

This was the first episode following executive producer and author Elmore Leonard's death in August 2013. The cast honored Leonard by putting an empty chair in front of the filming monitors. Walton Goggins said, "there was one day in particular that was really kind of hard... there was this one scene and I just couldn't get it right. I was tired because it was the end of the day. And I just said, 'F— it. I'm going to sit in your chair, Elmore. I'm just going to sit down'. And it was, for lack of a better word... special and comforting. I think when it's all said and done, we will be a small piece of cloth in Elmore's coat. But it's something I think for all of us... that we're really going to hang our hats on. It's a big thing at the end of your life to say you were part of a literary giant's career." Before the airing of the episode, a 90-second tribute to Leonard aired. The extended tribute was added in the season's DVD set and includes interviews with the cast about their experiences with Leonard.

=== Casting ===
Starting with this episode, Jere Burns is now credited as series regular. Despite being credited, Jacob Pitts and Erica Tazel do not appear in the episode as their respective characters.

The episode marked the return of Damon Herriman as Dewey Crowe, last seen in "Thick as Mud". Yost explained that getting Dewey back on the series was pivotal but Herriman's schedule played a role in their decision to withhold his return until this episode. It also marked the return of James LeGros as Wade Messer, last seen in "Harlan Roulette". Yost previously expressed interest in having the character return in the fourth season.

In September 2013, Michael Rapaport joined the series in the recurring role of Dale Crowe Jr., "the sexy and charismatic patriarch of a white-trash Florida crime family. Dale's an ex-convict who owns a gator farm; he is smart, savvy and ruthless, all in the name of family." As the role required him to use a Southern accent, Rapaport sent the producers a clip of him on the film American Brown and "a fresh voice memo he'd recorded on his phone of a made-up monologue." On the same month, Alicia Witt and Edi Gathegi joined the series as Wendy Crowe and Jean Baptiste. Wendy was described as "the smart, sexy sister of crime lord Dale Crowe" while Baptiste was described as "a Haitian criminal in the employ of the Crowe family." The next month, A. J. Buckley joined as Danny Crowe, "the romantic sociopath of the Crowe family."

In December 2013, it was reported that Dave Foley would guest star on the episode as "one of 'the Canadians' involved in a 'distribution problem' that is vexing partners-in-crime Boyd and Wynn." The episode reunited Foley with recurring cast member Stephen Root as both starred on NewsRadio although their characters don't share scenes together. On the same month, David Koechner was reported to have a role in the episode as Deputy Marshal Greg Sutter

=== Filming ===
Filming for the episode and the season started in October 2013.

== Reception ==
=== Viewers ===
In its original American broadcast, "A Murder of Crowes" was seen by an estimated 2.84 million household viewers and gained a 1.1 ratings share among adults aged 18–49, according to Nielsen Media Research. This means that 1.1 percent of all households with televisions watched the episode. This was a 26% increase in viewership from the previous episode, which was watched by 2.25 million viewers with a 0.7 in the 18-49 demographics. But it was a 21% decrease in viewership from the previous season premiere, which was watched by 3.59 million viewers with a 1.3 in the 18-49 demographics.

=== Critical reviews ===
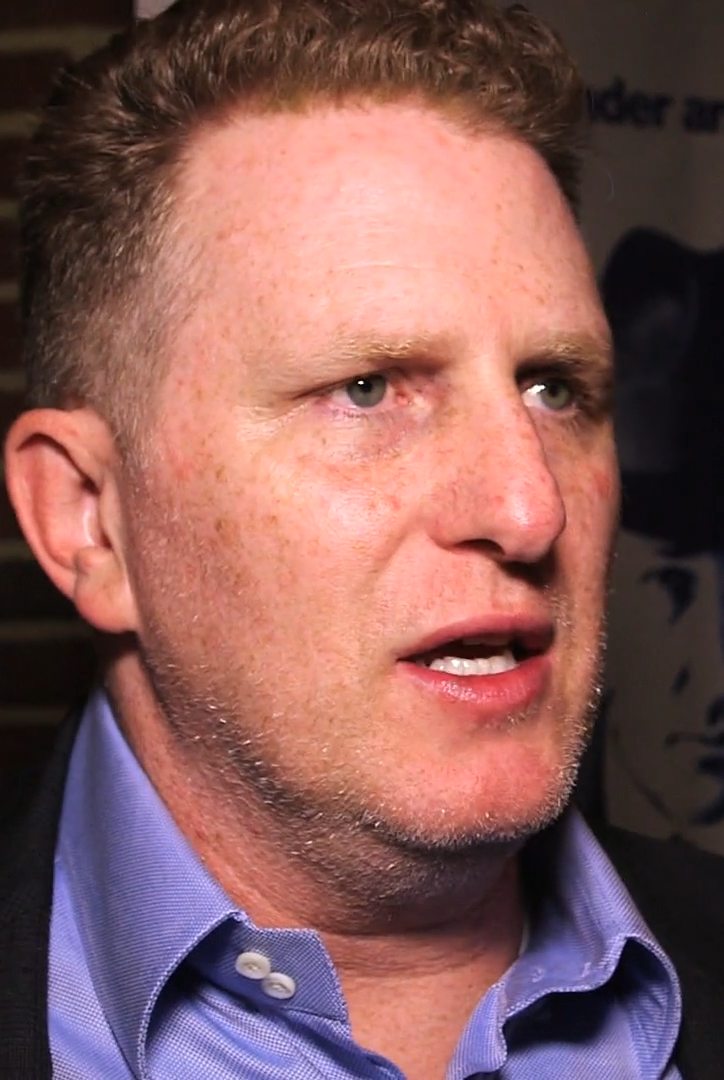
Michael Rapaport's performance in the episode drew mixed reactions from critics.

"A Murder of Crowes" received generally positive reviews from critics. Seth Amitin of IGN gave the episode a "good" 7.4 out of 10 and wrote in his verdict, "The episode itself stands on its own: it's decent and mildly comical at times and has a little depth. It's clear there's something much greater in store for us, but it's not quite as deep as other Justified episodes and there are some major questions about what happens from here. For a series that has done so well for itself in serialized drama, it feels like something's a little off. I hope I'm wrong."

Alasdair Wilkins of The A.V. Club gave the episode a "B+" grade and wrote, "Sudden, deadly betrayals define 'A Murder Of Crowes', and not one of them is what you could sensibly call rational or well-considered. There's only one killing in tonight's episode that suggests any particular cunning or foresight, and there, it's actually Raylan Givens who is maneuvered into pulling the trigger." Kevin Fitzpatrick of Screen Crush wrote, "'A Murder of Crowes' generally proves as effective as we've come to expect introducing a few new wrinkles into Raylan's personal life, while setting up a string of new characters sure to make their way to Harlan in the coming weeks."

Alan Sepinwall of HitFix wrote, "Good to have Justified back. As usual, there are a lot of moving pieces here, and some characters who aren't really dealt with in the premiere, so we'll have to see what the actual shape of the season becomes. But more Dewey Crowe is never a bad thing."

Joe Reid of Vulture gave the episode a 3 star rating out of 5 and wrote, "Is there too much plot in this premiere? Maybe. I've barely scratched the surface. But the episode is still vintage Justified, full of mayhem and brittle humor." Holly Anderson of Grantland wrote, "Justified's fifth season premieres with 'A Murder of Crowes', an hour of television that serves as a Great Muppet Caper opening number of sorts — myriad promises layered atop one another, starring just about everybody on the show who’s not dead yet. There's no slow-building crescendo to a kick line, but it wouldn't be that out of place. This makes for a more packed episode cast than you maybe might imagine, despite the series's reliably prolific body count."

Dan Forcella of TV Fanatic gave the episode a perfect 5 star rating out of 5 and wrote, "Now that Breaking Bad is off the air, I consider Justified the best drama on television. And with the return of Raylan, Boyd and company - along with the appearance of the always interesting guest stars - the Justified Season 5 opener lived up to that billing. Whether it be the Crowders, the Bennetts, or even sometimes the Givens, the series has always been great in telling stories about troubled families." Jack McKinney of Paste gave the episode a 7.4 out of 10 and wrote, "A chess episode is an episode whose sole purpose is to move pieces into place to prepare for future plot developments. There is no true plot progression per se in a chess episode outside of basic character interaction and/or introduction. You see where I'm going with this. The fifth season premiere of Justified is a chess episode if there ever was one."
