= Good Intentions (Justified) =

- Justified episode
- Episode no.: Season 5 Episode 3
- Directed by: Dean Parisot
- Written by: Benjamin Cavell
- Cinematography by: Francis Kenny
- Editing by: Eric L. Beason
- Original air date: January 21, 2014
- Running time: 45 minutes

Guest appearances
- Michael Rapaport as Daryl Crowe Jr.; James LeGros as Wade Messer; Edi Gathegi as Jean Baptiste; Sam Anderson as Lee Paxton; Xander Berkeley as Charles Monroe; A. J. Buckley as Danny Crowe; Gabrielle Dennis as Gloria; Damon Herriman as Dewey Crowe; Scott Anthony Leet as Henry Granger; Jesse Luken as Jimmy Tolan; Don McManus as The Wildman; Amy Smart as Alison Brander; Bill Tangradi as Cyrus; Karolina Wydra as Mara Paxton; William Gregory Lee as Nick Mooney; Justin Welborn as Carl

Episode chronology
← Previous "The Kids Aren't All Right"	Next → "Over the Mountain"
- Justified (season 5)

"Good Intentions" is the third episode of the fifth season of the American Neo-Western television series Justified. It is the 55th overall episode of the series and was written by supervising producer Benjamin Cavell and directed by Dean Parisot. It originally aired on FX on January 21, 2014.

The series is based on Elmore Leonard's stories about the character Raylan Givens, particularly "Fire in the Hole", which serves as the basis for the episode. The series follows Raylan Givens, a tough deputy U.S. Marshal enforcing his own brand of justice. The series revolves around the inhabitants and culture in the Appalachian Mountains area of eastern Kentucky, specifically Harlan County where many of the main characters grew up. In the episode, Raylan is king for a day in the seized mansion of a notorious mob accountant, while Boyd tries to regain his stranglehold on the Harlan heroin market.

According to Nielsen Media Research, the episode was seen by an estimated 2.50 million household viewers and gained a 0.9 ratings share among adults aged 18–49. The episode received positive reviews from critics, who praised the ending although some expressed insatisfaction at the main plot and lack of progress in the plot.

== Plot ==
Boyd (Walton Goggins) accuses Duffy (Jere Burns) of sabotaging the drug shipment but Duffy claims not to be involved. They then start rounding up a list of possible suspects. Raylan (Timothy Olyphant) and Alison (Amy Smart) are about to have sex in Monroe's (Xander Berkeley) mansion when a man named Henry Granger (Scott Anthony Leet) shows up outside with a baseball bat. When Raylan questions if Monroe sent him, Granger leaves.

The next day, Monroe has been released on bail but reaffirms to Raylan that he didn't send anyone to threaten him the previous night. Art (Nick Searcy) discovers the threat and orders Rachel (Erica Tazel) to stay with Raylan in Monroe's mansion, much to Raylan's annoyance. Meanwhile, Paxton (Sam Anderson) recovers from his coma and tells Mooney (William Gregory Lee) that Boyd will not be prosecuted for anything even if Mara (Karolina Wydra) changes her testimony. Paxton tells Mooney to protect Mara and orders him to kill Boyd. Secretly, Mara warns Boyd about this just as he and Duffy find out that Cyrus (Bill Tangradi) was involved in the shipment after telling a woman known as "Candy".

Dewey (Damon Herriman) feels nervous, as now Daryl (Michael Rapaport) and Danny (A. J. Buckley) are in Harlan. Daryl is interested in working with Dewey with his new fortune but is angered when he finds out that he bought Audrey's from Boyd for $250,000, which far exceeds its value and they could've used the money for a better bar. He tells Dewey to reclaim $100,000 from Boyd. Meanwhile, Raylan confronts Granger at his house, who claims that he didn't come for Raylan but for Alison, as he claims that she planted drugs, resulting in him losing custody of his son. Monroe deduces that his maid Gloria (Gabrielle Dennis) sent Granger so she could retrieve money from a safe that Duffy left in the mansion, so he sends her to the house to get it.

As Boyd prepares to find out more about Candy, Dewey shows up and demands $100,000 but Boyd does not fall for his demands. Dewey then desperately asks Boyd for the money, as he fears Daryl. Boyd then gives Dewey a speech, telling him to confront him and leaves for a mission. Boyd and Mara then trick Mooney into entering the house where Boyd threatens him at gunpoint while Mara threatens to cut his genitals. Boyd offers Mooney the chance to save himself by lying to Paxton, telling him that he killed Boyd. Without any other option, Mooney accepts. In order to convince Paxton of his death, Boyd and Mara work to plant his tattoos on a dead body. Gloria arrives at the mansion and opens the safe, which contains gold bars, but is discovered by Raylan and Rachel. They convince her to save herself by lying to Monroe that there is no gold. When she tells him, Monroe leaves to kill Duffy. Raylan arrives first to question Duffy about the safe when they hear gunshots outside. Monroe arrived but was mortally wound by Duffy's hitman while Rachel holds the hitman at gunpoint.

Inspired by Boyd's talk, Dewey confronts Daryl and tells him he wants him gone. Daryl seems understanding but he takes Dewey to a room to see something: Baptiste (Edi Gathegi) and Danny are torturing Wade (James LeGros) because he has been skimming Audrey's money for Boyd, which explains why Dewey has received very low income. Daryl then hands Dewey a handgun, telling him he needs to kill Wade. At the bar, Carl (Justin Welborn) delivers a caste to Boyd, which constrains "Candy": revealed to be Teri (Cathy Baron). He takes her phone to call the person who stole the shipment, revealed to be Johnny (David Meunier).

== Production ==
=== Development ===
In December 2013, it was reported that the third episode of the fifth season would be titled "Good Intentions", and was to be directed by Dean Parisot and written by supervising producer Benjamin Cavell.

=== Writing ===
When questioned about Henry Granger's claim that Alison planted drugs, series developer Graham Yost said, "It was always our belief that yeah, she did it. It was a very, very bad guy, and he shouldn't have had a kid with him, and so yeah, she did it for the sake of the kid. We have established that she is not as pure as the driven snow, but she had nothing to do with the grab for the confederate gold. She just thought that Raylan might enjoy that little bit of titillation [when she told him he'd never know for sure]. Ooh, she's a bad girl, you know."

=== Casting ===
Despite being credited, Jacob Pitts does not appear in the episode as his respective character. The episode featured David Meunier's return as Johnny Crowder in an audio role. In order to keep his appearance a surprise, he was uncredited for the episode.

== Reception ==
=== Viewers ===
In its original American broadcast, "Good Intentions" was seen by an estimated 2.50 million household viewers and gained a 0.9 ratings share among adults aged 18–49, according to Nielsen Media Research. This means that 0.9 percent of all households with televisions watched the episode. This was a 12% increase in viewership from the previous episode, which was watched by 2.23 million viewers with a 0.8 in the 18-49 demographics.

=== Critical reviews ===
"Good Intentions" received positive reviews from critics. Seth Amitin of IGN gave the episode a "great" 8.3 out of 10 and wrote in his verdict, "'Good Intentions' led us on to a much greater idea of where this season is going and proved to be a good conduit episode for the season. It wasn't thrilling or massively entertaining, but it was neat and tidy. It maintained the season stasis and threw in a couple of good twists and turns."

Alasdair Wilkins of The A.V. Club gave the episode a "B" grade and wrote, "This is a messy episode of Justified, one in which nobody seems to have any clear idea what they are doing, and that character uncertainty bleeds over just a little too much to the storytelling itself." Kevin Fitzpatrick of Screen Crush wrote, "So while 'Good Intentions' isn't the most eventful, or direction-filled hour of the early season, we at least have a heading for more dramatic hours to come. In the meantime, all of the Art. Just give give us all the Art putdowns our tin-ears can take. Nick Searcy has been relegated to an office for far too long. And hey, where's Tim this week?"

Alan Sepinwall of HitFix wrote, "Mainly, though, I think I'm preferring the Raylan side of things so far because it's fun. Justified can handle a wide variety of tones, and the show's best season by far was the fairly dark second one. But its most reliable tone, in successful stories and muddled ones, incorporates plenty of the wry humor that was the late, great Elmore Leonard's stock in trade." James Quealley of The Star-Ledger wrote, "There was nothing particularly bad about 'Good Intentions', a whodunnit (or who's trying to do it) tale that has Raylan sure someone is playing him but not too sure who is doing the playing, but there wasn't anything terribly engrossing about it either."

Joe Reid of Vulture gave the episode a 4 star rating out of 5 and wrote, "The key line in 'Good Intentions' comes from Boyd, who's taunting a captured drug distributor, Cyrus, who he thinks tipped off the guys who stole his drug shipment." Holly Anderson of Grantland wrote, "We've reached the point in the season when the pellets are yet to fly but the air gun's been vigorously pumped, so to speak, and it's always right about now when we start catching ourselves watching for moments that'll come back in big ways later on."

Dan Forcella of TV Fanatic gave the episode a 4.5 star rating out of 5 and wrote, "As great as Raylan's tussle with Monroe was, and as awesome it was to watch Boyd continue to struggle, the best thing about 'Good Intentions' was seeing how Daryl Crowe Jr. worked his way into a power position in Kentucky so quickly." Jack McKinney of Paste gave the episode an 8.3 out of 10 and wrote, "It isn't really fair to expect any show to reach new heights week in and week out and Justified, despite its consistent brilliance, is no exception. While episode three of the season is something of a letdown from episode two, it still has more high points than low."
