= Kill the Messenger (Justified) =

- Justified episode
- Episode no.: Season 5 Episode 6
- Directed by: Don Kurt
- Written by: Ingrid Escajeda
- Cinematography by: Francis Kenny
- Editing by: Eric L. Beason
- Original air date: February 11, 2014
- Running time: 50 minutes

Guest appearances
- Michael Rapaport as Daryl Crowe Jr.; A. J. Buckley as Danny Crowe; Damon Herriman as Dewey Crowe; John Kapelos as Picker; Jesse Luken as Jimmy Tolan; Jacob Lofland as Kendal Crowe; Don McManus as Billy Geist; Danielle Panabaker as Penny; Amy Smart as Alison Brander; Alicia Witt as Wendy Crowe; Branton Box as Gunnar Swift; Mickey Jones as Rodney "Hot Rod" Dunham; James Kyson as Yoon; Justin Welborn as Carl

Episode chronology
← Previous "Shot All to Hell"	Next → "Raw Deal"
- Justified (season 5)

"Kill the Messenger" is the sixth episode of the fifth season of the American Neo-Western television series Justified. It is the 58th overall episode of the series and was written by co-producer Ingrid Escajeda and directed by executive producer Don Kurt. It originally aired on FX on February 11, 2014.

The series is based on Elmore Leonard's stories about the character Raylan Givens, particularly "Fire in the Hole", which serves as the basis for the episode. The series follows Raylan Givens, a tough deputy U.S. Marshal enforcing his own brand of justice. The series revolves around the inhabitants and culture in the Appalachian Mountains area of eastern Kentucky, specifically Harlan County where many of the main characters grew up. In the episode, an attack on Alison sends Raylan to Harlan in search of payback, while Boyd scrambles to arrange protection for Ava.

According to Nielsen Media Research, the episode was seen by an estimated 2.33 million household viewers and gained a 0.8 ratings share among adults aged 18–49. The episode received generally positive reviews from critics, although critics expressed frustration with the episode's pace and lack of direction for the season.

== Plot ==
After his confession, Raylan (Timothy Olyphant) approaches a disappointed Art (Nick Searcy) at a bar. Art punches him in the face and leaves the bar. Meanwhile, Ava (Joelle Carter) is transferred to a women's prison and placed in a solitary cell.

Boyd (Walton Goggins) visits former partner Gunnar Swift (Branton Box) to ask for his family help in protecting Ava in prison, as Swift's sister is in the same facility. That night, Alison (Amy Smart) visits the Crowes for a mandatory check-up on Kendal (Jacob Lofland). The Crowes mock her relationship with Raylan. Danny (A. J. Buckley) intimidates her, and after she leaves, rear-ends her car and drives her off the highway. Back at Audrey's, Danny tells Darryl (Michael Rapaport) that the vanished Jean-Baptiste had badmouthed him and spoke of leaving Kentucky, and Kendal nervously backs him up.

Danny and Dewey (Damon Herriman) confront Carl (Justin Welborn) at Boyd's bar. Carl refuses to disclose Boyd's location, and after a struggle they knock him out, intending to ransom him to Boyd. Raylan and Rachel (Erica Tazel) visit the Crowes, looking for Danny, following Alison's crash. Danny and Dewey hide behind the door, ready to attack until Wendy (Alicia Witt) convinces Raylan to leave. Ava is now released into general population. Swift betrays Boyd for having abandoned his white supremacist roots, and his sister and her gang attack Ava, hacking off some of her hair.

After making a deal with Korean gangsters, Boyd learns of Ava's attack. He and Jimmy (Jesse Luken), trying to find Carl, call his phone and Dewey answers. However, poor reception prevents Boyd from realizing Dewey has kidnapped Carl. Meanwhile, Raylan and Rachel discover Danny with a bound and beaten Carl at the cabin, while Dewey runs off. Before Raylan can take Danny into custody, Carl claims that he and Danny are having a consensual sadomasochistic encounter, so Raylan and Rachel let Carl go and leave without Danny.

In the car afterwards, Raylan refuses to discuss his and Art's conflict with Rachel, who realizes it may just be worse than she was thinking. Boyd, Carl and Jimmy confront the Crowes at Audrey's, and Boyd offers to pay them to help him deal with Swift at his warehouse for the betrayal, with Daryl brutally attacking him. Boyd later calls Hot Rod (Mickey Jones) to discuss their business. Hot Rod gives him a coded message and Boyd realizes that Johnny is holding him hostage. Boyd later visits Daryl and offers him another job: he wants Daryl to kill Johnny.

== Production ==
=== Development ===
In January 2014, it was reported that the sixth episode of the fifth season would be titled "Kill the Messenger", and was to be directed by executive producer Don Kurt and written by co-producer Ingrid Escajeda. The episode was originally titled "Shoot the Messenger".

=== Writing ===
Regarding the opening scene, series developer Graham Yost said, "we had scripted this scene where essentially nothing is said and Art punches him, and Don thought of the bar door being open and the rain coming down. Other scenes were gonna be in the teaser, and then our feeling was just no, this is such an important scene let's just make it the entirety of the teaser. There was a Willie Nelson song that we had that we just couldn’t afford. Our crack music people, [music supervisor] Greg Sill and [music editor] Lisa Arpino found another song and it just somehow worked."

Yost also revealed that Jean Baptiste's death wasn't planned at the moment of writing the episode so the original plan was having him in the episode. He further explained, "that scene between Darryl, Kendal, and Danny talking about Jean-Baptiste was something that was shot after the rest of the episode was shot."

== Reception ==
=== Viewers ===
In its original American broadcast, "Kill the Messenger" was seen by an estimated 2.33 million household viewers and gained a 0.8 ratings share among adults aged 18–49, according to Nielsen Media Research. This means that 0.8 percent of all households with televisions watched the episode. This was a slight decrease in viewership from the previous episode, which was watched by 2.39 million viewers with a 0.9 in the 18-49 demographics.

=== Critical reviews ===
"Kill the Messenger" received generally positive reviews from critics. Seth Amitin of IGN gave the episode a "good" 7.4 out of 10 and wrote in his verdict, "'Kill the Messenger' was an OK episode. It had a cool opening. It did its part in maintaining the season arcs, but a lack of originality and a few stories that don't seem to be going anywhere - and didn't seem to add much on the whole - made for a pretty mediocre episode. While I maintain the writers of Justified should be trusted, it's time to start wondering where this is going."

Alasdair Wilkins of The A.V. Club gave the episode a "B+" grade and wrote, "I don't think that's the case, although tonight's storytelling decision does put considerably more pressure on Justified to deliver the goods when that shit storm of biblical proportions finally hits. The reason I'm willing to go along with this is that, by delaying the narrative fallout of Raylan's choices, 'Kill The Messenger' is able instead to explore the thematic and character-focused implications." Kevin Fitzpatrick of Screen Crush wrote, "All in all, probably one of the more entertaining and event-filled episodes of the season to date, though perhaps lacking some of the tension from last week's installment. Either way, Justified season 5 is definitely starting to hit a stride, however long it took, and however long it takes before we have a clear sense of who to root for in the end."

Alan Sepinwall of HitFix wrote, "'Kill the Messenger' was as long as last week's 'Shot All to Hell' and had zero fatalities, but it was a much more satisfying, cohesive episode overall." James Quealley of The Star-Ledger wrote, "'Kill The Messenger' is a solid enough episode, certainly above the normal grade for a crime drama these days. But it comes in the wake of one of this series' best episodes, and it focuses largely on a set of villains who pale in comparison to the rest of Justified's rather impressive rogues gallery."

Joe Reid of Vulture gave the episode a 3 star rating out of 5 and wrote, "Is there a contest in the Justified writers' room to see who can pack the most plot into an episode? Season five makes it seem as though there is; it's just one damn thing after another after another, the upside of which is there's never a dull moment; the downside being that it sometimes feels like motion for motion's sake." Holly Anderson of Grantland wrote, "The climax action of 'Shot All to Hell' takes place offscreen, but you can hazard a guess that's probably close to right."

Dan Forcella of TV Fanatic gave the episode a 4 star rating out of 5 and wrote, "Again, 'Kill the Messenger' wasn't the best episode of the season on its own, but it sure continues a strong early run, and I wouldn't be surprised if this wasn't the perfect setup hour for the next stage of the game." Jack McKinney of Paste gave the episode an 8.9 out of 10 and wrote, "I do not approach this show without sympathy. Outside of police procedurals and westerns, it is hard for any show to sustain itself for more than a few seasons. Once you attach a high expectation of quality, the level of difficulty ramps up so quickly that it is easy to understand some trial and error coupled with a need to try new things. I am, of course, talking about Darryl Crowe Jr."
