= Whistle Past the Graveyard =

- Justified episode
- Episode no.: Season 5 Episode 8
- Directed by: Peter Werner
- Written by: Chris Provenzano
- Cinematography by: Francis Kenny
- Editing by: Steven Nevius
- Original air date: March 4, 2014
- Running time: 43 minutes

Guest appearances
- Michael Rapaport as Daryl Crowe Jr.; Kyle Bornheimer as Jack Anderson; A. J. Buckley as Danny Crowe; Dale Dickey as Judith; William Forsythe as Michael; Damon Herriman as Dewey Crowe; Jesse Luken as Jimmy Tolan; Jacob Lofland as Kendal Crowe; Danielle Panabaker as Penny; Amy Smart as Alison Brander; Alicia Witt as Wendy Crowe; Deidrie Henry as Rowena; J. Anthony Pena as Corey Flores; Justin Welborn as Carl

Episode chronology
← Previous "Raw Deal"	Next → "Wrong Roads"
- Justified (season 5)

"Whistle Past the Graveyard" is the eighth episode of the fifth season of the American Neo-Western television series Justified. It is the 60th overall episode of the series and was written by co-executive producer Chris Provenzano and directed by Peter Werner. It originally aired on FX on March 4, 2014.

The series is based on Elmore Leonard's stories about the character Raylan Givens, particularly "Fire in the Hole", which serves as the basis for the episode. The series follows Raylan Givens, a tough deputy U.S. Marshal enforcing his own brand of justice. The series revolves around the inhabitants and culture in the Appalachian Mountains area of eastern Kentucky, specifically Harlan County where many of the main characters grew up. In the episode, Raylan chases a missing Crowe, while Boyd and his new partners fight their way back across the border.

According to Nielsen Media Research, the episode was seen by an estimated 2.32 million household viewers and gained a 0.9 ratings share among adults aged 18–49. The episode received mixed-to-positive reviews from critics, who criticized Ava's storyline, pace, tone, and lack of building momentum, with many describing the episode as "dull".

== Plot ==
In the aftermath of the shooting, the Mexicans and Yoon are angry at Boyd (Walton Goggins) and the Crowes for getting people killed in the territory and threaten to abandon their partnership. Boyd persuades them to continue but they tell him he needs to take the corpses back to America.

Kendal (Jacob Lofland) is picked up by his uncle, Jack (Kyle Bornheimer) and they meet with Wendy (Alicia Witt) at a restaurant. Wendy excuses herself to go to the restroom but when she returns, he finds that they already left for Cedar Point. She returns to Audrey's and finds a man named Michael (William Forsythe), who is looking for Jack. Wendy uses a shotgun to blow the tires on his car and leaves. She then calls Raylan (Timothy Olyphant), who is about to leave for Florida with Alison (Amy Smart), for his help. Raylan refuses to help her until Alison is aware of the situation, as Wendy promises to help her end her suspension and offers to give Raylan information on her brothers.

In prison, Penny (Danielle Panabaker) dislocates Ava's (Joelle Carter) shoulder, causing her to go the infirmary in order to get drugs but the nurse refuses to supply anything for her. She later meets her, scolding her for asking in public. Kendal deduces that Jack is hiding something and confronts him, to which Jack creates a fabricated story about preventing a rape. Kendal sees through this and demands the truth, also revealing that he knows Jack and Wendy are his parents. Jack then reveals that he skimmed money from poker games and stole $35,000 from Michael, who is now pursuing him. Jack escapes when he notices Michael nearby, and escapes with the duffel bag of money, causing Michael to take Kendal with him.

Boyd and the Crowes face problems in Mexico while transporting the truck. The Crowes complain about having to travel in the container without an air conditioner, forcing them to get a separate car for them. To complicate matters, they are stopped by Mexican police officers. The officers are aware of their intentions and Boyd is forced to bribe them to buy their silence. However, the officers confiscate their truck, unaware that they transporting the corpses and not the drugs.

Raylan, Wendy and Jack meet with Michael and Kendal. Michael reveals that his son caught Jack skimming and Jack put him on a coma before running away, explaining why Michael is following him. Michael and Jack then fight until Raylan stops them, arresting both for their criminal activities. Wendy talks with Kendal about their real identities but Kendal does not intend to change their status. Worried about Kendal's future, Raylan decides to give him the money he intended to take to Florida. He then talks with Wendy about their part of the deal, but Wendy reveals that she doesn't know anything besides knowing they are in Mexico, upsetting Raylan.

Boyd and the Crowes celebrate at a bar just as Daryl's (Michael Rapaport) contact arrives to help them smuggle the drugs. However, Jimmy (Jesse Luken) tells Boyd that he overheard a Spanish conversation, signaling that Daryl set everything up. Boyd and Jimmy then leave with the Crowes, not telling them their new discovery. Raylan visits Alison, telling her about the events of the day, stating that Wendy will honor her word and end her suspension. Despite this, Alison states she is breaking up with Raylan.

== Production ==
=== Development ===
In February 2014, it was reported that the eighth episode of the fifth season would be titled "Whistle Past the Graveyard", and was to be directed by Peter Werner and written by co-executive producer Chris Provenzano. The episode was originally set to be released on February 25, 2014.

=== Writing ===
Series developer Graham Yost said that the writers originally didn't plan the revelation that Kendal was Wendy's and Jack's son but felt inspired to do it after the Drew Thompson reveal on season 4.

Regarding Raylan's decision to hand Kendal the money, Yost explained, "that's just that little crack into Raylan — he is looking out for this kid. He sees himself. He grew up in a crime family, and he was lucky enough to have Aunt Helen and was able to get out. He wants to help him. That money will have at least a small ramification in subsequent stories."

=== Casting ===
Despite being credited, Nick Searcy, Jere Burns, Jacob Pitts and Erica Tazel do not appear in the episode as their respective characters.

== Reception ==
=== Viewers ===
In its original American broadcast, "Whistle Past the Graveyard" was seen by an estimated 2.32 million household viewers and gained a 0.9 ratings share among adults aged 18–49, according to Nielsen Media Research. This means that 0.9 percent of all households with televisions watched the episode. This was a 10% increase in viewership from the previous episode, which was watched by 2.10 million viewers with a 0.7 in the 18-49 demographics.

=== Critical reviews ===
"Whistle Past the Graveyard" received mixed-to-positive reviews from critics. Seth Amitin of IGN gave the episode a "good" 7.2 out of 10 and wrote in his verdict, "Despite it's [sic] great name, 'Whistle Past the Graveyard' wasn't Justified at its best and, even worse, it failed to build on last week's episode. Justified was at one time very, very strong at building episodes like Lincoln Logs to a crescendo and Season 5 has noticeably been missing that. This episode, which was a crucial one to forming a bond to the ending, missed its mark by quite a bit. Hopefully, we get some kind of redemptive ending to Season 5 and a good lead-in to the final season."

Alasdair Wilkins of The A.V. Club gave the episode a "B+" grade and wrote, "'Whistle Past The Graveyard' benefits from that brief moment of honesty, because it provides a sense of stakes that aren't always present in Raylan's side of the narrative." Kevin Fitzpatrick of Screen Crush wrote, "There must be something in the water over at FX, making Justified the second series in as many days to lose a bit of footing so deeply into its fifth season. Justified's more one-off stories have historically run the gamut, last week's 'Raw Deal' at least affording more humorous character work as Raylan chased down a one-legged hacker. This time around, we're at least tethered to the ongoing story with Wendy and Kendal Crowe, who turned out to have a bit more in common genetically than we thought, though with Raylan wearily slogging his way from scene to scene without the aid of the Marshals, it's hard to feel any thing of consequence arriving from their side of the story, even if Wendy chose the side of the angels in the end."

Alan Sepinwall of HitFix wrote, "'Whistle Past the Graveyard', though, was the first episode of the season to fall almost completely flat. It increases the tension between Boyd and the Crowes, while at the same time suggesting an ever-so-slight thaw between Raylan and Wendy that could pay off in the season's concluding chapters, but as an hour of TV, it was something this show should never be: dull." James Quealley of The Star-Ledger wrote, "Something about this season has lacked. I've long complained about the Crowes' sub-standard brand of villainy, and that's a problem the series seems to have repaired by the end of 'Whistle Past The Graveyard', but I am starting to wonder if the real problem this year is Raylan."

Matt Zoller Seitz of Vulture gave the episode a 2 star rating out of 5 and wrote, "When I say 'Whistle Past the Graveyard' was the weakest episode of Justified's fifth season to date, it's important to remember that we're talking about Justified here, so it's like saying that you've just eaten the least tasty piece of candy in a sampler. Still, nearly everything in this episode felt off to me, even the parts that entertained. And yet for all that, there was still plenty to chew on." Holly Anderson of Grantland wrote, "This week in particular took Raylan away from his fellow marshals, whose reaction to his Nicky Augustine confession and its consequences is what we want to see the very most. We're mercifully spared this week from a bureaucratic fallout scene resulting from Raylan doing marshal-type work on vacation, so that's something."

Dan Forcella of TV Fanatic gave the episode a 4 star rating out of 5 and wrote, "If the writers were going to leave Ava in prison for the season, they should have come up with a more original story for her. Instead, we're getting something that's been done before many times. I love Ava, but not this season. It's such a disappointment. There are still a few episodes left this season. Let's get the old fierce and fun Ava back!" Jack McKinney of Paste gave the episode an 8.6 out of 10 and wrote, "Anyone besides me spending about ten minutes every week wondering if a Justified spin-off has been scheduled in the usual Justified timeslot?"
