= Raw Deal (Justified) =

- Justified episode
- Episode no.: Season 5 Episode 7
- Directed by: Bill Johnson
- Written by: VJ Boyd
- Cinematography by: Richard Crudo
- Editing by: Steve Polivka
- Original air date: February 25, 2014
- Running time: 44 minutes

Guest appearances
- Michael Rapaport as Daryl Crowe Jr.; David Meunier as Johnny Crowder; Gary Basaraba as Kemp; A. J. Buckley as Danny Crowe; Dale Dickey as Judith; Steve Harris as Roscoe; Wood Harris as Jay; Damon Herriman as Dewey Crowe; Jesse Luken as Jimmy Tolan; Jacob Lofland as Kendal Crowe; Danielle Panabaker as Penny; Amy Smart as Alison Brander; Alicia Witt as Wendy Crowe; Branton Box as Gunnar Swift; Greg Bryan as Larry Salmeron; Adrienne Frantz as Candace; James Kyson as Yoon; T. J. Linnard as T.C. Flemming; Justin Welborn as Carl

Episode chronology
← Previous "Kill the Messenger"	Next → "Whistle Past the Graveyard"
- Justified (season 5)

"Raw Deal" is the seventh episode of the fifth season of the American Neo-Western television series Justified. It is the 59th overall episode of the series and was written by co-producer VJ Boyd and directed by Bill Johnson. It originally aired on FX on February 25, 2014.

The series is based on Elmore Leonard's stories about the character Raylan Givens, particularly "Fire in the Hole", which serves as the basis for the episode. The series follows Raylan Givens, a tough deputy U.S. Marshal enforcing his own brand of justice. The series revolves around the inhabitants and culture in the Appalachian Mountains area of eastern Kentucky, specifically Harlan County where many of the main characters grew up. In the episode, Boyd and the Crowes fly South for a crucial drug score, while Raylan pursues a small-time grifter with big time enemies.

According to Nielsen Media Research, the episode was seen by an estimated 2.10 million household viewers and gained a 0.7 ratings share among adults aged 18–49. The episode received generally positive reviews from critics, with critics praising the closure to Johnny's storyline although critics criticized the pace, occasional aimlessness and Ava's storyline. Critics also expressed immense frustration at the progress on Raylan's and Art's storyline, with many signaling that the show hasn't made good use of it.

== Plot ==
Boyd (Walton Goggins) and the Crowes raid Hot Rod's warehouse, but find no sign of him nor Johnny (David Meunier). Boyd then states that he will go to Mexico as he thinks Johnny might be heading for his drug shipment.

At the office, Art (Nick Searcy) has assigned Raylan (Timothy Olyphant) to attend more cases. A man named Larry Salmeron (Greg Bryan) asks for his help, as the Marshals took his winnings from an online gaming site owned by Charles Monroe. Raylan shows him that he was scammed as the notice incorrectly wrote "Marshall" instead of "Marshal". Furious, Larry and his henchman Kemp (Gary Basaraba) visit the man responsible for the scam, T.C. Flemming (T.J. Linnard) and his girlfriend Candace (Adrienne Frantz). However, upon learning of the money involved, Kemp kills Larry in front of them. Kemp then takes Candace with him when Raylan appears in the apartment, warning T.C. to deliver all the money or he will kill Candace. T.C. escapes through a window as Raylan finds Larry's corpse in the bathtub.

Johnny is in Mexico and convinces a local Mexican criminal to let him visit Korean gangster Yoon (James Kyson) after offering a better deal than Boyd's. Boyd arrives at Yoon's mansion in Mexico and is surprised to see Johnny already there. Boyd is then shocked when Yoon tells him he accepted Johnny's higher offer and Johnny calls his henchmen to bring the money to the mansion. Upon getting the money, Yoon and the Mexican partner with Johnny and allow him to do anything with Boyd. They just warn him that he can't kill him in Mexico, as it would arise suspicions and problems for them.

In prison, Ava (Joelle Carter) enters into the protection of Judith (Dale Dickey), supplying drugs for her in prison. However, when she finds that her future involves having sex with guards, she plants drugs on a guard, causing his arrest and heavily impacting Judith's business. Alison (Amy Smart) tells Raylan that she got suspended from her job after Wendy (Alicia Witt) talked to her boss about many misconduct cases and her relationship with Raylan. Raylan is also taunted by T.C., who has been hacking and emptying his bank accounts. The Marshals track T.C.'s location to a hotel room, but it's actually the location of Kemp and Candace. Candace then gives them T.C.'s location and the Marshals arrest him at his grandma's house. While driving him to jail, Raylan is given tips by T.C. on how to win money through radio stations.

Kendal (Jacob Lofland) tries to talk with Wendy about Baptiste's murder but can't bring himself to tell her so he calls his uncle Jack for help. At the office, Raylan finally talks with Art, who has been evading him and only talks to him through Rachel (Erica Tazel) or Tim (Jacob Pitts). He demands that Art either reinstates him as deputy or transfer him anywhere else. He then leaves for Florida to visit his daughter, telling Art he wants an answer when he returns. Before leaving for Florida, he talks with Wendy at a bar, where he deduces that Daryl (Michael Rapaport) was involved in Dyllie's death, surprising her.

In Mexico, Johnny and his henchmen take Boyd to the desert to show him the shipment. However, the Crowes emerge from the shipment and take them hostage. Yoon never planned to side with Johnny and tipped off Boyd. As he offers a chance to his crew to join him, Daryl and Danny (A. J. Buckley) kill Johnny's henchmen after they think they're pulling guns on them, infuriating Boyd as Yoon said they couldn't kill in Mexico. Johnny taunts Boyd for the moment, which prompts him to kill Johnny by shooting him in the head. Realizing what just happened, he calls Yoon to tell him that they've got a problem.

== Production ==
=== Development ===
In January 2014, it was reported that the seventh episode of the fifth season would be titled "Raw Deal", and was to be directed by Bill Johnson and written by co-producer VJ Boyd. The episode was originally set to be released on February 18, 2014.

=== Writing ===
On Raylan's and Art's new trajectory, series developer Graham Yost said, "we were just like, how are we going to kick off this story? How is Raylan going to get into it? And we just thought well, what about walk-ins? We haven't done walk-ins on our show, but it's probably a part of the real life there in the eastern district of Kentucky. That's probably a little bit of a crap detail for someone like Raylan who wants to always be out running, and gunning, and chasing down fugitives."

Regarding Johnny's death, Yost explained, "Well, I mean, that's the thing: the audience pretty much knows that Boyd's not going to die, but how can he [kill Johnny] in a surprising way? We wanted at least a couple scenes between Boyd and Johnny before Johnny met his end, with just a sense of past, and regret, and their years together, and this is where it ended up. Then when it came right down to the killing of Johnny, it was my push that it happen in a way where there was not a big buildup to it. That you think there's going to be a big buildup to it, but instead it just happens. Because we've had big, big moments before, like when Boyd killed Devil, but this just sort of felt like that was the right way to do it."

=== Casting ===
Despite being credited, Jere Burns does not appear in the episode as his respective character.

== Reception ==
=== Viewers ===
In its original American broadcast, "Raw Deal" was seen by an estimated 2.10 million household viewers and gained a 0.7 ratings share among adults aged 18–49, according to Nielsen Media Research. This means that 0.7 percent of all households with televisions watched the episode. This was a 10% decrease in viewership from the previous episode, which was watched by 2.33 million viewers with a 0.8 in the 18-49 demographics.

=== Critical reviews ===
"Raw Deal" received generally positive reviews from critics. Seth Amitin of IGN gave the episode a "great" 8 out of 10 and wrote in his verdict, "A break from the serial plots was needed and writer VJ Boyd delivered. It wasn't the best episode of the series, but it did take some of the stress off of the mostly uninteresting Ava-in-prison story and gave the serial plots some time to breathe. We'll see if this leads anywhere, but for now, it seems like Justified's fifth season might be back on track to Interesting Town."

Alasdair Wilkins of The A.V. Club gave the episode a "B−" grade and wrote, "As the fifth season of Justified hits its midpoint, it's still not clear what overarching story connects this year's episodes into a coherent whole. That fact can't help but drag down this episode; the constituent pieces to tonight's story are solid enough, but, taken together, they don't add up to as much as they should. The most compelling aspect of 'Raw Deal' — Cousin Johnny's final, ill-fated play — works well enough right up to the moment he's shot." Kevin Fitzpatrick of Screen Crush wrote, "The prior two installments of Justified really turned up the intensity of the 5th season, thanks in no small part to the bowties wrapped around most of the straggling threads, and the smart decision to put Team Crowder and Team Crowe together, though it still hasn't shaken a sense of the wonky ups and downs the season has wrought. Just when we thought Raylan's betrayal would represent a game-changing shift between him and Art, so far we've mostly only seen the passive aggression and empty threats, without any real discussion as to what either knows."

Alan Sepinwall of HitFix wrote, "Olyphant and Goggins are each good enough to carry their own end of things, but Justified is always better when they're together. The final season almost certainly has to be about the final confrontation between those two men; now we get to see what it takes to get them there." James Quealley of The Star-Ledger wrote, "'Raw Deal' is another in a string of crowded Justified episodes, and the season's pace has certainly quickened since the events of 'Shot All To Hell'."

Matt Zoller Seitz of Vulture gave the episode a 3 star rating out of 5 and wrote, "If there were an Olympics for burning through plot, Justified would be a front-runner for the gold. At the end of 'Raw Deal' — written by V.J. Boyd and directed by Bill Johnson — everything seems to have been re-oriented yet again." Holly Anderson of Grantland wrote, "The plot borders dangerously on caricature, with Raylan's early-onset dad-life gruffitude pitted against a guy who's such an over-the-top stereotype of a pissant hacker/blogger type that he is actually captured hiding out in his grandma's basement."

Dan Forcella of TV Fanatic gave the episode a 3.5 star rating out of 5 and wrote, "I have hopes that the back half of Justified Season 5 turns a corner and brings everything together as well as this series has done time and time again. For now I'll say that the most recent hour didn't leave me needing more immediately. That's a change." Jack McKinney of Paste gave the episode an 8.9 out of 10 and wrote, "Of course, the feathery weight of his recent caseload weighs heavily in the ultimatum that Raylan delivers to Art at the end of the night. So once again I can understand the narrative necessity of the story decisions that were made in order to get us to where we needed to go."
