= Raw Deal =

Raw Deal may refer to:

== Films ==
- Raw Deal (1948 film), an American film noir starring Claire Trevor and directed by Anthony Mann
- Raw Deal (1977 film), an Australian western starring Gerard Kennedy
- Raw Deal (1986 film), an American action film starring Arnold Schwarzenegger
- Raw Deal (1991 film), an American crime drama

== Music ==
- Raw Deal (band), later Killing Time, an American hardcore punk band
- Raw Deal, a 1991 album by Gringos Locos featuring Ben Granfelt
- Raw Deal, a 1986 album by Sonny Burgess

== Other uses ==
- "Raw Deal" (Justified), an episode of the TV series Justified
- "Raw Deal", a season 1 episode of The Loud House
