= The Kids Aren't All Right =

- Justified episode
- Episode no.: Season 5 Episode 2
- Directed by: Bill Johnson
- Written by: Dave Andron
- Cinematography by: Francis Kenny
- Editing by: Steven Nevius
- Original air date: January 14, 2014
- Running time: 45 minutes

Guest appearances
- Michael Rapaport as Daryl Crowe Jr.; James LeGros as Wade Messer; Sam Anderson as Lee Paxton; Xander Berkeley as Charles Monroe; Riley Bodenstab as Derrick Waters; Gabrielle Dennis as Gloria; Kaitlyn Dever as Loretta McCready; Rick Gomez as AUSA David Vasquez; Shashawnee Hall as Chief Deputy U.S. Marshal Ed Kirkland; Steve Harris as Roscoe; Wood Harris as Jay; Damon Herriman as Dewey Crowe; Jesse Luken as Jimmy Tolan; Don McManus as The Wildman; Amy Smart as Alison Brander; Bill Tangradi as Cyrus; Karolina Wydra as Mara Paxton; Mickey Jones as Rodney "Hot Rod" Dunham; William Gregory Lee as Nick Mooney; Justin Welborn as Carl

Episode chronology
← Previous "A Murder of Crowes"	Next → "Good Intentions"
- Justified (season 5)

"The Kids Aren't All Right" is the second episode of the fifth season of the American Neo-Western television series Justified. It is the 54th overall episode of the series and was written by executive producer Dave Andron and directed by Bill Johnson. It originally aired on FX on January 14, 2014.

The series is based on Elmore Leonard's stories about the character Raylan Givens, particularly "Fire in the Hole", which serves as the basis for the episode. The series follows Raylan Givens, a tough deputy U.S. Marshal enforcing his own brand of justice. The series revolves around the inhabitants and culture in the Appalachian Mountains area of eastern Kentucky, specifically Harlan County where many of the main characters grew up. In the episode, Raylan must help Loretta when she and her boyfriend get in trouble with marijuana dealers. Meanwhile, Boyd faces pressure for failing to get Ava released from prison.

According to Nielsen Media Research, the episode was seen by an estimated 2.23 million household viewers and gained a 0.8 ratings share among adults aged 18–49. The episode received near critical acclaim, with critics considering the episode as an improvement on the premiere and welcoming back Kaitlyn Dever as Loretta.

== Plot ==
Two criminals, Jay (Wood Harris) and Roscoe (Steve Harris) attack one of their employees for selling marijuana to teenagers. Hot Rod (Mickey Jones) arrives and has the two execute the employee. Nick Mooney (William Gregory Lee) visits Mara (Karolina Wydra) at the hospital, where he tries to have her confess that Boyd (Walton Goggins) was responsible for attacking Paxton (Sam Anderson).

Mooney and officers confront Boyd at the bar, deducing that he attacked Paxton. However, Mara denies acknowledging Boyd as the attacker, forcing Mooney not to arrest him. After arresting mob accountant Charles Monroe (Xander Berkeley), Raylan (Timothy Olyphant) visits Loretta (Kaitlyn Dever) in jail, as she sold marijuana to a cop's son. While Raylan understands her situation, he decides not to bail her out and let her stay in jail for the night to teach her a lesson. After being confronted by Loretta's boyfriend Derrick Waters (Riley Bodenstab), Raylan meets Loretta's social worker Alison Brander (Amy Smart). Raylan confronts Derrick at his apartment, finding him with Jay and Roscoe and tells him to break up with Loretta as he is a bad influence on her.

Boyd talks with Mara at the hospital, who says she intends to keep her promise of not revealing his name if he pays the money. Mooney discovers about their meeting and stops Mara in a highway and attacks her for humiliating him and threatens her to reveal Boyd as the attacker or Mooney will consider her the prime suspect. Raylan is visited by Loretta, who states that Derrick disappeared. Raylan saves Derrick from being killed by Jay and Roscoe and is revealed that Loretta mixed them up with Hot Rod. Raylan meets with Hot Rod and threatens him to leave Harlan. Knowing about Arlo's influence on him, Hot Rod accepts.

After leaving Derrick at a bus stop, Raylan finds that Loretta used him to get rid of Hot Rod and take his money now that Derrick wasn't around. At Audrey's, Dewey (Damon Herriman) is shocked to discover Daryl (Michael Rapaport) arrived at Harlan. As Raylan meets with Alison, Art (Nick Searcy) starts investigating Sammy Tonin's death and his association to Nicky Augustine's death. Mara stays with Paxton at the hospital and it appears he is waking up from his coma. Boyd and Jimmy (Jesse Luken) arrive to get a drug shipment but find it that it was stolen.

== Production ==
=== Development ===
In December 2013, it was reported that the second episode of the fifth season would be titled "The Kids Aren't All Right", and was to be directed by Bill Johnson and written by executive producer Dave Andron.

=== Writing ===
Regarding the opening scene, series developer Graham Yost said, "That scene was added later on. We didn't have enough to establish Hot Rod as a real violent threat. When Raylan ends up with the big showdown later, we wanted to make sure that the audience thought, 'Well, this could really go badly'. So Andron just wrote the scene, they shot it, and there it is."

=== Casting ===
The episode featured the return of Kaitlyn Dever as Loretta McCready, being seen for the last time on "Coalition". The producers managed to get Dever after accommodating her schedule with Last Man Standing.

In December 2013, it was reported that brothers Wood Harris and Steve Harris would guest star in the episode as "some toughs who get wrapped up in Loretta's storyline." On the same day, it was reported that Amy Smart was joining the series as Alison Brander, "a social worker who — being a pretty blonde and all — strikes Raylan's fancy."

== Reception ==
=== Viewers ===
In its original American broadcast, "The Kids Aren't All Right" was seen by an estimated 2.23 million household viewers and gained a 0.8 ratings share among adults aged 18–49, according to Nielsen Media Research. This means that 0.8 percent of all households with televisions watched the episode. This was a 22% decrease in viewership from the previous episode, which was watched by 2.84 million viewers with a 1.1 in the 18-49 demographics.

=== Critical reviews ===
"The Kids Aren't All Right" received near critical acclaim. Seth Amitin of IGN gave the episode an "amazing" 9.5 out of 10 and wrote in his verdict, "Overall, things are looking very good for Season 5. The depth of Justified's world reappeared in 'The Kids Are All Right', thanks to its tremendous attention to detail and its playfulness with its characters and surrounding. Even without its Darryl-meets-up-with-Dewey cliffhanger to keep the season arc going, it was a top-tier Justified episode. It was fun. Let's hope we see more of that and more of the building tension."

Alasdair Wilkins of The A.V. Club gave the episode an "A−" grade and wrote, "At the end of both 'A Murder Of Crowes' and 'The Kids Aren't All Right', Boyd was presented with seemingly insoluble problems. In the first case, he lost control, while here he numbly maintains his composure. The problem for Boyd is how little difference it seems to make. No matter how he responds, the world seems to have it in for him." Kevin Fitzpatrick of Screen Crush wrote, "Justified has always been Justified, sharp characters and dialogue before momentum, though 'The Kids Aren't All Right' still seems to lack that special something that kept season 4 moving, even without a requisite big bad."

Alan Sepinwall of HitFix wrote, "Justified could certainly keep telling short stories like this for a long time to come, and have a blast doing so. But the show has also aspired to more than dark comic one-offs, and it's in the serialized parts where the wear and tear is a bit more noticeable." James Quealley of The Star-Ledger wrote, "Sure, everything that's going on with Raylan as a character is mucho interesting, but Boyd's the one sucking up all the narrative tension right now and that's not a bad thing. No one would ever make the mistake of thinking the man in the Stetson isn't Justified's main character, but it doesn't hurt when Boyd pinch hits every once in a while."

Joe Reid of Vulture gave the episode a 3 star rating out of 5 and wrote, "I was thinking about the future of Justified yesterday — where it had been and where it might be going — when word came down that the show's sixth season would be its last. I’d been thinking maybe the show should quit while it was ahead by letting what seemed to be the natural order of things play out. Whether the replacements are enthusiastic about their new roles or resigned and bitter, it's what they have to do, and what life requires, so they do it." Holly Anderson of Grantland wrote, "Those who hold to the cult theory that Walton Goggins's hairstyle can foretell the events of the show will find plenty to unpack this week. Good height, but the direction is just all over the place. Walking a razor line between feathered and frazzled, and wavering."

Dan Forcella of TV Fanatic gave the episode a 4.5 star rating out of 5 and wrote, "'The Kids Aren't All Right' was filled with twists, turns, excitement, romance and Darryl Crowe making it to Kentucky." Jack McKinney of Paste gave the episode a 9.1 out of 10 and wrote, "This week's episode is so superior to what we saw last week that I truly cannot believe that they are consecutive episodes of the same television show. There is more wit, tone and life in the first five minutes of this week's outing than the full running time of the premiere. I could go on and on, but I'll just end by saying that now Justified is really back on television. And I would have forgiven FX if they had scrapped the premiere and just started us here."
