= Little Accidents =

2014 film by Sara Colangelo

- Theatrical release poster.
- Directed by: Sara Colangelo
- Written by: Sara Colangelo
- Based on: Little Accidents (short film) by Sara Colangelo
- Produced by: Anne Carey; Jason Michael Berman; Tom Fore
- Starring: Elizabeth Banks; Boyd Holbrook; Chloë Sevigny; Jacob Lofland; Josh Lucas
- Cinematography: Rachel Morrison
- Edited by: Suzy Elmiger
- Music by: Marcelo Zarvos
- Distributed by: Amplify
- Release date: January 22, 2014 (Sundance Film Festival)
- Running time: 105 minutes
- Country: United States
- Language: English

Little Accidents is a 2014 American independent Southern Gothic drama film written and directed by Sara Colangelo. Her feature length film debut, Colangelo based the film's screenplay on her own 2010 award-winning short film of same name, and took inspiration from the actual events of the Sago Mine and the Upper Big Branch Mine disasters in West Virginia, that occurred in 2006 and 2010 respectively.

Set in the Appalachian countryside in West Virginia in the aftermath of a major coal mining accident, the film focuses on three characters, Amos Jenkins, the sole surviving miner of the accident, portrayed by Boyd Holbrook, Diane Doyle, the wife of the coal mine's supervisor, portrayed by Elizabeth Banks, and Owen Briggs, the eldest teenage son of a miner who perished in the accident, portrayed by Jacob Lofland.

Amos finds himself conflicted when community members dependent upon the mine, including his own father, plead with to keep quiet about the mine's unsafe conditions to avoid its permanent closure, whereas family members of the deceased miners, including Owen's mother, portrayed by Chloe Sevigny, ask for him to participate in a class action lawsuit against the company operating the mine. On the wealthier side of the town, Diane's husband Bill, portrayed by Josh Lucas, finds himself implicated in an investigation regarding his role as the mine's supervisor. Their teenage son J.T., played by Travis Tope, is later involved in an encounter with Owen, that results in his disappearance.

Filming took place during the summer of 2013 in and around the cities of Beckley and Charleston in the state of West Virginia.

The film had its world premiere at 2014 Sundance Film Festival on January 22, 2014. The film was released on January 16, 2015 in a limited release by Amplify.

== Plot ==
A recent accident in a local coal mine has devastated the small town where it occurred. Amos Jenkins, the lone survivor, is torn between protecting his colleagues and speaking to a union lawyer about what happened. Amos lives with his aging father, Basil, who he looks after.

Owen, a local working-class boy who babysits his little brother, James (who has Down syndrome), struggles to fit in with the wealthier boys from the other side of town, especially JT, the rich son of a mining executive. JT is a bully who mocks James and calls him a "retard", prompting Owen to blurt out the truth: that JT's father, Bill, is responsible for the mining accident and should be in jail. JT, letting slip how the stress of his father's guilt is hurting him emotionally, accuses the town of "fucking milking it!" (the accident). After an intense struggle, Owen tosses a pebble at JT in self-defense; the pebble disorients JT and the boy trips and falls, accidentally hitting his head on a large boulder. Owen and James are horrified but cover up JT's apparently deceased corpse in the forest.

Diane, JT's mother, suffers emotional turmoil from her son's disappearance and receives little sympathy from the other townsfolk, as Diane is married to Bill (Bill and Diane have called the townsfolk, including their own employees, "trailer trash" in the past). Bill himself, knowing that he's responsible for the mining accident, withdraws socially and isn't able to relate to Diane at all. Diane bonds with Amos despite their class differences, and the two troubled citizens form a clandestine romantic affair. James is traumatized by witnessing JT's death but cannot communicate this to his family due to his disability. Owen discusses responsibility at length with Amos, who walks with a limp due to an injury from the mining accident. Basil dies in his sleep, leaving Amos alone without a family for the first time in his life. Some of the townsfolk find solace in religion, but others are having a crisis of faith and even hyperventilate from stress.

JT's death is finally revealed when Owen, who has secretly been crying at night and having bad dreams about the accident, admits to what occurred in the forest. Despite Owen having acted in self-defence and not meaning to hurt JT, the film leaves Owen's legal fate ambiguous. A search party is seen combing through the forest as Bill and Diane come upon their son's abandoned corpse, falling to their knees and sobbing together.

== Cast ==
- Elizabeth Banks as Diana Doyle
- Boyd Holbrook as Amos Jenkins
- Chloë Sevigny as Kendra Briggs
- Josh Lucas as Bill Doyle
- Jacob Lofland as Owen Briggs
- Travis Tope as JT Doyle

== Production ==
Production began in the summer of 2013 in West Virginia. Anne Carey, Jason Michael Berman, Summer Shelton and Thomas B. Fore signed on to produce the film. Executive producers include Mike Feuer, Todd Feuer and Kwesi Collisson from MindSmack Productions as well as Chris Columbus, Eleanor Columbus, Kwesi Collisson and Ruth Mutch.

== Release ==
The film had its world premiere at the Sundance Film Festival on January 22, 2014. The film went on to premiere at the Dallas International Film Festival, Sundance London Festival, San Francisco International Film Festival, Little Rock Film Festival, Seattle International Film Festival, Karlovy Vary Film Festival, Hamptons International Film Festival, San Diego Film Festival, Denver International Film Festival, Vienna International Film Festival, Napa Valley Film Festival. Amplify later acquired distribution rights to the film with a planned January 2015 release. The film was released on January 16, 2015, in a limited release and through video on demand.

== Reception ==
The review aggregator Rotten Tomatoes reported an approval rating of 56%, with an average score of 6.1/10, based on 39 reviews. The website's consensus reads, "Little Accidents has good intentions -- and a talented cast, led by Elizabeth Banks -- but it drowns them under dour melodrama." Metacritic gave the film a weighted average score of 56 out of 100, based on 18 critics, indicating "mixed or average" reviews.
