= Jere Burns =

American actor (b. 1954)

- Born: Jere Eugene Burns II; October 15, 1954 (age 71); Cambridge, Massachusetts, U.S.
- Education: University of Massachusetts Amherst (BA); New York University (MFA)
- Occupation: Actor
- Years active: 1970–present
- Spouses: Melissa Keeler (m. 1982; div. 1996) Kathleen Kinmont (m. 1997; div. 1999) Leslie Cohen (m. 2008; div. 2018)
- Children: 4

Jere Eugene Burns II (/ˈdʒɛri/; born October 15, 1954) is an American actor who has appeared in theatre productions and on television. He played the roles of ladies' man Kirk Morris on the television series Dear John, DIA psychiatrist Anson Fullerton on the television series Burn Notice, Jack on the sitcom Something So Right, and Dixie Mafia middleman Wynn Duffy on Justified.

== Early life and education ==
Burns was born in Cambridge, Massachusetts, the son of a gown and cap manufacturer. He attended the Buckingham Browne & Nichols School and graduated in 1973. Burns was drawn to acting late in college. After graduating from the University of Massachusetts Amherst in 1980, he moved to Manhattan and was cast in Don Juan at the New York Shakespeare Festival.

== Career ==
Burns has appeared on Broadway; his Broadway theatre credits include Hairspray and After the Night and the Music.

Burns made his television debut in a small role on ABC's ABC Afterschool Special episode "Mom's on Strike" in 1984. He had a recurring role as rapist James Fitzsimmons on Hill Street Blues and body collector Breughel on Max Headroom. In 1988 he landed the role of sleazy Kirk Morris on Dear John. In 1989 he appeared in the William Lustig film Hit List as Jared Riley. He appeared as the villainous Cade Dalton on the NBC miniseries The Gambler Returns: The Luck of the Draw (1991), hateful Vice President of Sales Pete Schmidt on Bob (1993), a member of the feuding family in Greedy (1994), Jack Farrell in Something So Right (1996), and Ben Stuart in Life-Size (2000). He portrayed the title character's brother in "The Trouble with Harry", an episode of the series Twice in a Lifetime directed by David Winning (2000); Frank Alfonse on Good Morning, Miami (2002); Keith on The King of Queens (2006); Michael on Help Me Help You (2006); Dr. Jim on Surviving Suburbia (2007); Derek Ford on Psych, Bosco on Grey's Anatomy (2013); and Jacob Tiernan on Lucifer (2019). He starred as an FBI agent in the movie Otis (2008). Other screen credits include Crocodile Dundee in Los Angeles (2001).

In 2010, he appeared in AMC's series Breaking Bad as the group leader for a Narcotics Anonymous meeting as a part of a twelve-step program, which main character Jesse Pinkman attended. He also had a recurring role on FX's Justified as Wynn Duffy, a sadistic lieutenant in the Dixie Mafia, and appeared as villain Anson Fullerton in Seasons 5 and 6 (2011–2012) of Burn Notice on USA Network.

Burns had a recurring role as Jake Abernathy on the A&E series Bates Motel in 2013, and appeared as Lieutenant Atkins in the TBS series Angie Tribeca.

== Personal life ==
In 1982, Burns was married to Melissa Keeler. After 14 years of marriage, they filed for divorce in 1996. The following year in 1997, he married actress Kathleen Kinmont, and they divorced in 1999. In 2008, he was married to Leslie Cohen. They later divorced in 2018 after ten years of marriage.

He has four children.

== Filmography ==
=== Film ===
Year	Title	Role	Notes
1986	Touch and Go	Levesque	
1986	Let's Get Harry	Washington Aide	
1989	Hit List	Jared Riley	
1989	Wired	Lou Connors	
1994	Greedy	Glen McTeague	
1997	Santa Fe	Dr. Dan Yates	
1998	My Giant	Weller, the Movie Director	
2001	Crocodile Dundee in Los Angeles	Arnan Rothman	
2002	Mother Ghost	Cemetery Agent	
2002	New Suit	Dixon Grain	
2005	What's Up, Scarlet?	Ben Zabrinski	
2008	Otis	Agent Ralph Hotchkiss	Direct-to-video
2009	Two:Thirteen	Jeffrey Nobels	
2011	Prom	Principal Dunnan	
2014	The Crop	The Farmer	Short film
2014	The Amateur	Joey's Dad	
2015	Larry Gaye: Renegade Male Flight Attendant	Herb Thompkins	
2015	The Muppets: First Look Presentation	Carl	Short film
2015	The Funhouse Massacre	Mental Manny	
2016	Hot Air	Major	
2018	Game Over, Man!	Mr. Duncan	Uncredited
2018	Incredibles 2	Detective (voice)	Cameo
2018	Adolescence	Mr. Z	
2020	The Catch	Eddie Nance	
2021	Evan Wood	Professor Timothy Phillips	

=== Television ===
Year	Title	Role	Notes
1970	The Psychiatrist	Steve	Episode: "God Bless the Children (Pilot)"
1984	Hill Street Blues	James Fitzsimmons	Episodes: "Watt a Way to Go" and "Rookie Nookie"
1984	ABC Afterschool Special	Hal	Episode: "Mom's on Strike"
1985	Street Hawk	Eddie Watson	Episode: "Fire on the Wing"
1985	Riptide	Kefler	Episode: "The Twisted Cross"
1985	Hunter	Greg Jones	Episode: "The Beach Boy"
1986	Remington Steele	Rick Badham	Episode: "Steele on the Air"
1986	The Last Precinct		Episode: "Pilot"
1986	CBS Schoolbreak Special	Brother Vinnie	Episode: "God, the Universe & Hot Fudge Sundaes"
1987	Ohara	Greene	Episode: "Eddie"
1987–1988	Max Headroom	Breughel / Breughal	4 episodes
1987	Crime Story	Pinter	Episode: "Little Girl Lost"; Credited as Jere Burns II
1988	Jake and the Fatman	Kevin Barry	Episode: "I Guess I'll Have to Change My Plan"
1988–1992	Dear John	Kirk Morris	90 episodes
1989	Turn Back the Clock	William Hawkins	Television movie
1990	Perry Mason: The Case of the Defiant Daughter	Cliff Bartel	Television movie
1991	The Gambler Returns: The Luck of the Draw	Cade Dalton	Television movie
1993	Down the Shore	Jeffrey Horan	Episode: "A Married Man"
1993	Bob	Pete Schmidt	8 episodes
1994–1995	The Mommies	Tom Booker	18 episodes
1995	Eye of the Stalker	Stephen Primes	Television movie
1996	The Secret She Carried	Lewis Snow	Television movie
1996–1998	Something So Right	Jack Farrell	37 episodes
1998	Fantasy Island	Pete Collins	Episode: "We're Not Worthy"
1999	Vengeance Unlimited	Steven Jensen	Uncredited; Episode: "Friends"
1999	Just Shoot Me!	Roy	Episode: "Nina's Choice"
1999	Road Rage	Eddie Madden	Television movie
2000	Life-Size	Ben Stuart	Television movie
2000	Twice in a Lifetime	Thomas "Tom" Lasky / Tom the Homeless Man	Episode: "The Trouble with Harry"
2000	For Your Love	Andy Winston	Episode: "The Talented Mr. Ripoff"
2000	Cover Me	Kerry Fever	Episode: "The Fever Flip"
2000	Touched by an Angel	Sam Rigney	Episode: "Legacy"
2001	The Outer Limits	Jake Worthy	Episode: "The Vessel"
2002	Sabrina the Teenage Witch	Gabriel	Episode: "Time After Time"
2002	Family Law	John Carruthers	Episode: "Big Brother"
2002–2004	Good Morning, Miami	Frank Alfano	35 episodes
2002	State of Grace	Chip Wheeler	Episodes: "Sophisticated Ladies" and "A Taste of Money"
2004–2007	Kim Possible	Mego (voice)	Episodes: "Go Team Go" and "Stop Team Go!"
2005	8 Simple Rules	Commissioner	Episode: "VolleyBrawl"
2005	Las Vegas	Dan Clayman	Episode: "One Nation, Under Surveillance"
2005	All of Us	Brian Goodman	3 episodes
2006	The War at Home	Howard	Episode: "Snow Job"
2006	The King of Queens	Keith	Episode: "Hartford Wailer"
2006	Will & Grace	Man in Cast	Episode: "Finale: Part 1"
2006	Dr. Vegas	Lawyer Friend	Episode: "Heal Thyself"
2006–2007	Help Me Help You	Michael	14 episodes
2006–2008	Boston Legal	A.D.A. Joe Isaacs	Episodes: "BL: Los Angeles" and "Rode vs. Wade: The Musical"
2006	Four Kings	Norman the Doorman	Episode: "Upper West Side Story"
2008	Psych	Derek Ford	Episode: "Disco Didn't Die. It Was Murdered!"
2008	According to Jim	Jerry	Episodes: "Andy's Proposal" and "Cabin Boys"
2009	CSI: Crime Scene Investigation	Dr. Shaw	Episode: "The Gone Dead Train"
2009	Surviving Suburbia	Dr. Jim	13 episodes
2010	The Geniuses	Charles Bodin	Television movie
2010	The Good Guys	Patrick Drayton	Episode: "The Whistleblower"
2010–2015	Justified	Wynn Duffy	46 episodes
2010–2011	Breaking Bad	Group Leader	4 episodes
2010	Strange Brew	Ted	Television movie
2011	Retired at 35	Donald	Episode: "Pilot"
2011	Love Begins	Sheriff Holden	Television movie
2011	Off the Map	Richie Salerno	Episode: "There's Nothing to Fix"
2011–2012	Burn Notice	Anson Fullerton	9 episodes
2011	Family Practice	George Foote	Television movie
2012	Hawaii Five-0	Spencer Madsen	Episode: "Popilikia"
2013	Bates Motel	Jake Abernathy	4 episodes
2013	Grey's Anatomy	Ben Bosco	Episode: "Map of You"
2015	Last Man Standing	Victor Vogelson	Episode: "Daddy Dearest"
2015	Suits	Vince Sanfilippo	Episode: "Denial"
2015	The Muppets	Carl	Episodes: "Pilot" and "Pig Girls Don't Cry"
2015	From Dusk till Dawn: The Series	Winchester Greely	Episodes: "The Last Temptation of Richard Gecko" and "There Will Be Blood"
2016	Major Crimes	Elliot Chase	Episode: "Moral Hazard"
2016–2018	Angie Tribeca	Chet Atkins, Paddy Atkins, Eric Atkins	40 episodes
2017–2018	American Dad!	Dimitrious Pertz (voice)	Episodes: "The Bitchin' Race" and "Klaustastrophe.tv"
2017–2018	I'm Dying Up Here	Sid Robbins	5 episodes
2018	The X-Files	Dr. Randolph Luvenis	Episode: "Nothing Lasts Forever"
2019	The Cool Kids	John	3 episodes
2019	Lucifer	Jacob Tiernan	Episode: "Devil Is as Devil Does"
2019	The Detour	Blu Brown	Episode: "The Entertainer"
2019–2021	All Rise	Adam Pryce	Episodes: "Fool for Liv" and "Bette Davis Eyes"
2020	Dead to Me	Howard Hastings	3 episodes
2022-2023	NCIS: Los Angeles	Howard Pembrook	3 episodes
2024	Death and Other Details	Llewellyn Mathers	9 episodes
2026-	The Young and the Restless	Dr. Laurence Markham	
