= Jacob Lofland =

American actor (born 1996)

- Born: Jacob Seth Lofland; July 30, 1996 (age 30); Briggsville, Arkansas, U.S.
- Occupation: Actor
- Years active: 2012–present

Jacob Seth Lofland (born July 30, 1996) is an American actor best known for his role as Neckbone in the film Mud (2012) and for his role as Aris in Maze Runner: The Scorch Trials (2015) and Maze Runner: The Death Cure (2018). In 2024, he began playing Cooper Norris in the Paramount+ series Landman.

== Life and career ==
Lofland was born in Briggsville, Arkansas, the son of Billy and Debra Lofland.

He began his film career in 2012 playing Neckbone in Jeff Nichols' Mud, with Matthew McConaughey and Tye Sheridan. The director wanted to find a young actor locally for the part, and had casting notices placed in regional newspapers. Coming across one of them, Lofland's mother recognized that her son fit every adjective of Neck's personality description, as well as bringing the boating and cycle riding experience for which Nichols was looking. Lofland sent in an application, and was called in to read for the casting director in Little Rock. Less than three weeks after his mother saw the open casting call in the paper, Lofland took his first plane flight to Austin to audition for Nichols and producer Sarah Green. He was offered the role and within a month found himself on location with a full movie crew.

In 2013, he joined the cast of Little Accidents, presented at the 2014 Sundance Film Festival.

In 2014, he joined the cast of the fifth season of Justified, and in 2015, he co-starred as Aris in the film Maze Runner: The Scorch Trials. In 2017, he played a young Eli McCullough in The Son. In 2018, Lofland reprised the role in Maze Runner: The Death Cure. In 2024, he appeared in Joker: Folie à Deux and Landman, a Paramount+ series created by Taylor Sheridan and Christian Wallace.

== Filmography ==
=== Film ===
Year	Title	Role
2012	Mud	Neckbone
2014	Little Accidents	Owen Briggs
2015	Maze Runner: The Scorch Trials	Aris
2016	Free State of Jones	Daniel
2017	Go North	Josh
2018	Maze Runner: The Death Cure	Aris
2021	12 Mighty Orphans	Snoggs
2021	A House on the Bayou	Isaac
2024	Joker: Folie à Deux	Ricky Meline

=== Television ===
Year	Title	Role	Notes
2014	Justified	Kendal Crowe	10 episodes
2015	Texas Rising	Colby Pitt	Miniseries; 5 episodes
2017–2019	The Son	Young Eli McCullough	Recurring role
2024–present	Landman	Cooper Norris	Main role
2026	Ram: Race For The Seat	Himself	Host

== Awards and nominations ==
Year	Award	Category	Work	Result
2014	Robert Altman Award At Independent Spirit Awards	Best Ensemble (shared with cast)	Mud	Won
2014	Leonardo's Horse at Milan International Film Festival	Best Supporting Actor	Little Accidents	Nominated
2016	Young Artist Award	Best Performance in a Feature Film – Supporting Young Actor (14–21)	Maze Runner: The Scorch Trials	Nominated
