= Jesse Luken =

American actor, producer, and writer (born 1983)

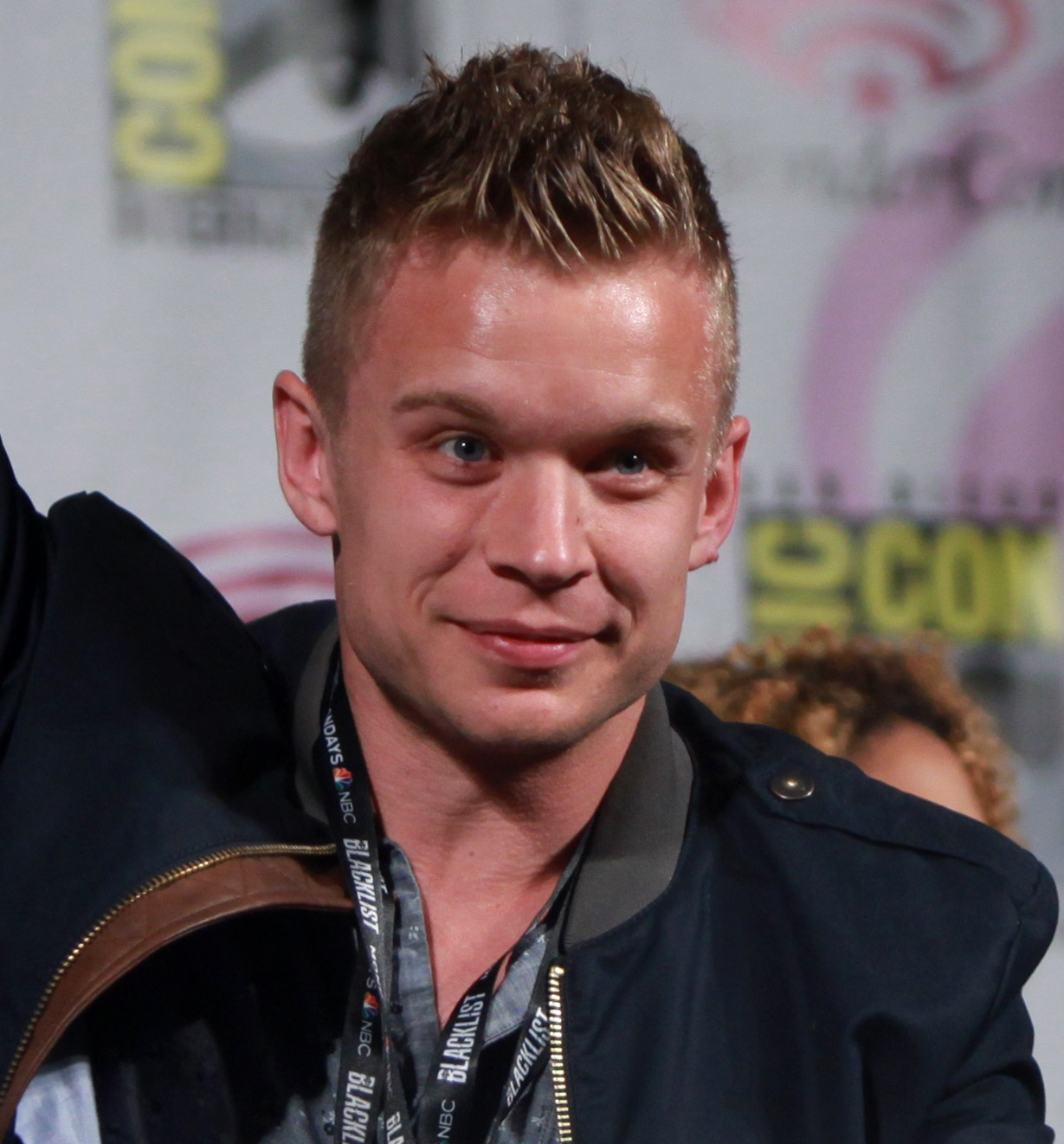
- Luken at WonderCon 2014
- Born: Jesse Christopher Luken; 1983 (age 42–43); Colorado Springs, Colorado, U.S.
- Occupations: Actor; producer; writer
- Years active: 2008–present

Jesse Christopher Luken (born 1983) is an American actor, producer, and writer. He is known for playing Jimmy Tolan in the FX drama series Justified and Eric in the CW science fiction romance series Star-Crossed.

== Career ==
Luken began his career in 2008 with the short film Starlet. He has also had guest appearances in television series such as Privileged, Three Rivers, Greek, and Law & Order: LA, as well as a recurring role in the comedy web series Spymates. In 2012, he got his break when he was cast in a recurring role in the Fox series Glee. Later that year, Luken was cast in the ABC drama Last Resort. His first major film role was in the award-winning film 42 portraying baseball player Eddie Stanky. He played a recurring character in Justified from Seasons 3–5.

== Personal life ==
Luken is a General William J. Palmer High School graduate and played baseball and football with Carl Wiedemann in his younger days. He studied at Colorado State University.

=== Legal issues ===
On December 6, 2018, Luken was arrested and charged with DUI after a single-car crash in Glendale, California. He posted bail and was released the same day.

== Filmography ==
Film
Year	Title	Role	Notes
2008	Starlet	Derek	Short film
2012	All-Beef Patty	Pat Kelly	Short film; also writer
2013	42	Eddie Stanky	
2013	Great American Dream	Ballplayer	
2014	The Guest	Drew	
2014	Lost in Gray	Taylor	Short film
2014	Born to Race: Fast Track	Luke	
2015	Day One	Sergeant McCloud	Short film
2016	Citrus Springs	Brandon	
2018	The Ballad of Buster Scruggs	Drover	Segment: "Near Algodones"

Television
Year	Title	Role	Notes
2008	Privileged	Beer gut guy	Episode: "All About the Power Position"
2009	Three Rivers	Tommy	Episode: "The Kindness of Strangers"
2010	Greek	Shirtless guy	Episode: "The Big Easy Does It"
2010	Law & Order: LA	Carlton Campbell	Episode: "Harbor City"
2011	NCIS	Corpsman	Episode: "Engaged (Part II)"
2012	Glee	Bobby "Boom Boom" Surette	4 episodes
2012–13	Last Resort	Wallace	4 episodes
2012–14	Justified	Jimmy Tolan	23 episodes
2013	The Mentalist	Pete Coen	Episode: "Red, White and Blue"
2014	Star-Crossed	Eric	9 episodes
2014	Castle	Carter Wexland	Episode: "Law & Boarder"
2014	Rush	Troy Huntsman	Episode: "Don't Ask Me Why"
2015	Sirens	Nick	3 episodes
2015	The Night Shift	Kyle	Episode: "Shock to the Heart"
2015	Minority Report	Michael Wynn	Episode: "The Present"
2015	Criminal Minds	William Duke Mason	Episode: "Outlaw"
2016	The Magicians	Mike	2 episodes
2016	Mom	Travis	Episode: "Beast Mode and Old People Kissing"
2016	Major Crimes	Nathan Jansen	Episode: "N.S.F.W"
2017	Timeless	Lindbergh	Episode: "The Lost Generation"
2017	Underground	Smoke	5 episodes
2017	S.W.A.T.	Ross Martin	Episode: "Pamilya"
2018	MacGyver	Owen Palmer	Episode: "Riley + Airplane"
2018	Shooter	Pete	Episode: "Alpha Dog"
2018	Medal of Honor	Seth Carter	Episode: "Ty M. Carter"
2020	9-1-1: Lone Star	Jake Harkes	2 Episodes
2020	The Resident	Marcus Thompson	Episode: "Doll E. Wood"
2019–20	Snowfall	Officer Herb "Nix" Nixon	10 Episodes
2022	The Rookie	Walt Lindbeck	Episode: "Labor Day"

Web
Year	Title	Role	Notes
2008	Luke 11:17	Waiter	Episode: "We Are What We Think About All Day Long"
2010–11	Spymates	Ned Meade	4 episodes
