= Follow Me =

Follow Me may refer to:

== Film and television ==
=== Film ===
- Follow Me, a 1969 film scored by Stu Phillips
- Follow Me! (film), a 1972 British comedy-drama directed by Carol Reed
- Follow Me (1989 film), a German drama directed by Maria Knilli
- Follow Me, a 2006 short film featuring John Boyd
- Follow Me, also known as No Escape, a 2020 American horror film
- Follow Me (2022 film), a documentary film about the shooting of Andrii Bohomaz

=== Television ===
- Follow Me TV (Canada), a multicultural community television channel
- Follow Me TV (Taiwan), now FTV One, a digital television channel
- Follow Me! (TV programme), a 1970s British English-language training programme
- "Follow Me", an episode of Beavis and Butt-head

== Theater ==
- Follow Me (musical), a 1916 Broadway production
- Follow Me a popular vaudeville production staged from 1922 to 1924 with performers including Susie Sutton

== Music ==
=== Albums ===
- Follow Me..., by Crispian St. Peters, 1966
- Follow Me (Bearfoot album) or the title song, 2006
- Follow Me (Do album) or the title song originally by Melanie C (see below), 2006
- Follow Me (Isac Elliot album), 2014
- Follow Me, by Kimiko Itoh, 1988
- Follow Me, by Hepa/Titus, a band featuring Kevin Rutmanis, 2012

=== Songs ===
- "Follow Me" (2NE1 song) or "Try to Follow Me", 2010
- "Follow Me" (Amanda Lear song), 1978
- "Follow Me" (Antique song), 2002
- "Follow Me" (Atomic Kitten song), 2000
- "Follow Me" (Demis Roussos song), 1982
- "Follow Me" (Hardwell song), 2015
- "Follow Me" (lyme & cybelle song), 1966
- "Follow Me" (Melanie C song), 1999; covered by Do (2006)
- "Follow Me" (Muse song), 2012
- "Follow Me" (Pnau song), 2001
- "Follow Me" (Uncle Kracker song), 2001
- "Follow Me", by Aly-Us, 1992
- "Follow Me", by ApologetiX from Grace Period, 2002 (Uncle Kracker parody song)
- "Follow Me", by Beat Crusaders from REST CRUSADERS, 2010
- "Follow Me", by Big Bang from Big Bang, 2009
- "Follow Me", by Cherry Bullet from Cherry Rush, 2021
- "Follow Me", by Chicago from Chicago 16, 1982
- "Follow Me", by Craig David from Born to Do It, 2000
- "Follow Me", by The Drifters, 1965
- "Follow Me", by E-girls from Lesson 1, 2013
- "Follow Me", by Gamma Ray from No World Order, 2001
- "Follow Me", by In Flames from I, the Mask, 2019
- "Follow Me", by Jamie Lynn Spears from Zoey 101: Music Mix, 2005
- "Follow Me", by John Denver from Take Me to Tomorrow, 1970
- "Follow Me", by Johnny Mathis from Faithfully, 1959
- "Follow Me", by Kay Hanley and Jun Senoue from the game Sonic Heroes, 2003
- "Follow Me", by P.O.D. from The Fundamental Elements of Southtown, 1999
- "Follow Me", by Pain from Cynic Paradise, 2008
- "Follow Me", by Pat Metheny Group from Imaginary Day, 1997
- "Follow Me", by Paul McCartney from Chaos and Creation in the Backyard, 2005
- "Follow Me", by Rory Gallagher from Top Priority, 1979
- "Follow Me", by Savatage from Edge of Thorns, 1993
- "Follow Me", by September from Dancing Shoes, 2007
- "Follow Me", by Serenity from Codex Atlanticus, 2016
- "Follow Me", by Sistar from So Cool, 2011
- "Follow Me", by Thirteen Senses from Contact, 2007
- "Follow Me", by Tkay Maidza from Tkay, 2016
- "Follow Me", by Transit from Joyride, 2014
- "Follow Me", by Usher from Confessions, 2004
- "Follow Me", by Wild Orchid from Wild Orchid, 1997
- "Follow Me", from the musical Camelot, 1960

== Other uses ==
- Follow Me (novel), a 2020 novel by Kathleen Barber
- Follow Me (sculpture), a U.S. Army memorial statue at Fort Benning, Georgia
- Follow Me!, a 1983 children's book by Mordicai Gerstein
- Follow-me, a private branch exchange telephone-system feature
- FollowMe Tandem, a coupling system that converts a bike into a trailer bike
- "Follow Me", the motto of the United States Army Infantry School
