= Follow Me TV =

Follow Me TV may refer to:

- Follow Me TV (Canada), multicultural Canadian TV station
- Follow Me TV (Taiwan), now known as FTV One, Taiwanese digital TV station, aimed to offer realtime traffic information to audiences, especially drivers with TV device on vehicle
