= Follow Me (novel) =

2017 novel by Kathleen Barber

- Author: Kathleen Barber
- Subject: stalking, hacking
- Genre: mystery
- Publication date: February 2020
- ISBN: 9781982101985

Follow Me is Kathleen Barber's second novel. Her first novel Are You Sleeping, published in 2017, was adapted into the well reviewed television series Truth Be Told.

Where her first novel revolved around the reactions of people to new evidence found by a podcaster, looking into the case of a man wrongfully convicted of murder, Follow Me revolves around the life of a prolific user of social media, with a large number of followers. In an interview on a CBS affiliate Barber said her protagonist learns "We’re Not All Friends Online".

Barber has said that, even though she is a lawyer, prior to the research she did when writing this novel, she had no idea how vulnerable ordinary people were to having their microphones and cameras surreptitiously monitored by simple widely available tools.

On April 27, 2020, Yahoo News published a list of the "Best Books of 2020 (So Far)", that included Follow Me.
