= Nichelle Tramble Spellman =

American television producer and writer (born 1967)

- Born: February 11, 1967 (age 59); Alameda County, California
- Other name: Nichelle D. Tramble
- Occupations: Television writer and producer
- Years active: 2007–present
- Spouse: Malcolm Spellman

Nichelle D. Tramble Spellman (born February 11, 1967) is an American television producer and writer.

== Career ==
In 2017, Spellman, and her husband, Malcolm Spellman, began to co-produce and co-write an alternate history television series for HBO, called Confederate, set in a present day America where slavery remained legal. The pair found themselves called upon to explain how African-American producers could be involved in a show focused around slavery.

She has worked as a writer or producer on The Good Wife, Justified, Mercy, Harper's Island and Women's Murder Club.

Nichelle Tramble Spellman is the creator and showrunner of the Apple TV+ drama series Truth Be Told, starring Octavia Spencer, Aaron Paul, Lizzy Caplan, Elizabeth Perkins, Ron Cephas Jones, Mekhi Phifer, Michael Beach, Tracie Thoms, and Annabella Sciorra. The limited series is inspired by the 2017 novel Are You Sleeping.

Truth Be Told debuted on Apple TV+ on December 6, 2019. In February 2020, Spellman won the NAACP Image Award for Outstanding Writing in a Dramatic Series for "Monster", the first episode of the series.

Spellman is also the author of the novels The Dying Ground and The Last King, published by Random House/Ballantine.

== Filmography ==
Year	Title	Credited as		Notes
Year	Title	Writer	Executive producer	Notes
2007–08	Women's Murder Club	Yes (2)	No	
2009	Harper's Island	Yes (1)	No	
2009–10	Mercy	Yes (2)	No	Also story editor
2012	Justified	Yes (1)	No	Also executive story editor
2012–16	The Good Wife	Yes (5)	Co-executive	
2019–23	Truth Be Told	Yes (3)	Yes	Also creator
2021	Snowfall	No	Consulting	
2026	The Drop: A Snowfall Saga	Yes (1)	Consulting	

== Awards and nominations ==
Year	Award	Category	Work	Result	Ref.
2013	Spur Awards	Spur Award for Best Drama Script (Fiction)	Justified	Nominated	
2014	Writers Guild of America Awards	Drama Series	The Good Wife	Nominated	
2015	Writers Guild of America Awards	Drama Series	The Good Wife	Nominated	
2020	NAACP Image Awards	Outstanding Writing in a Dramatic Series	Truth Be Told (for "Monster")	Won	
