= Kathleen Barber =

American novelist

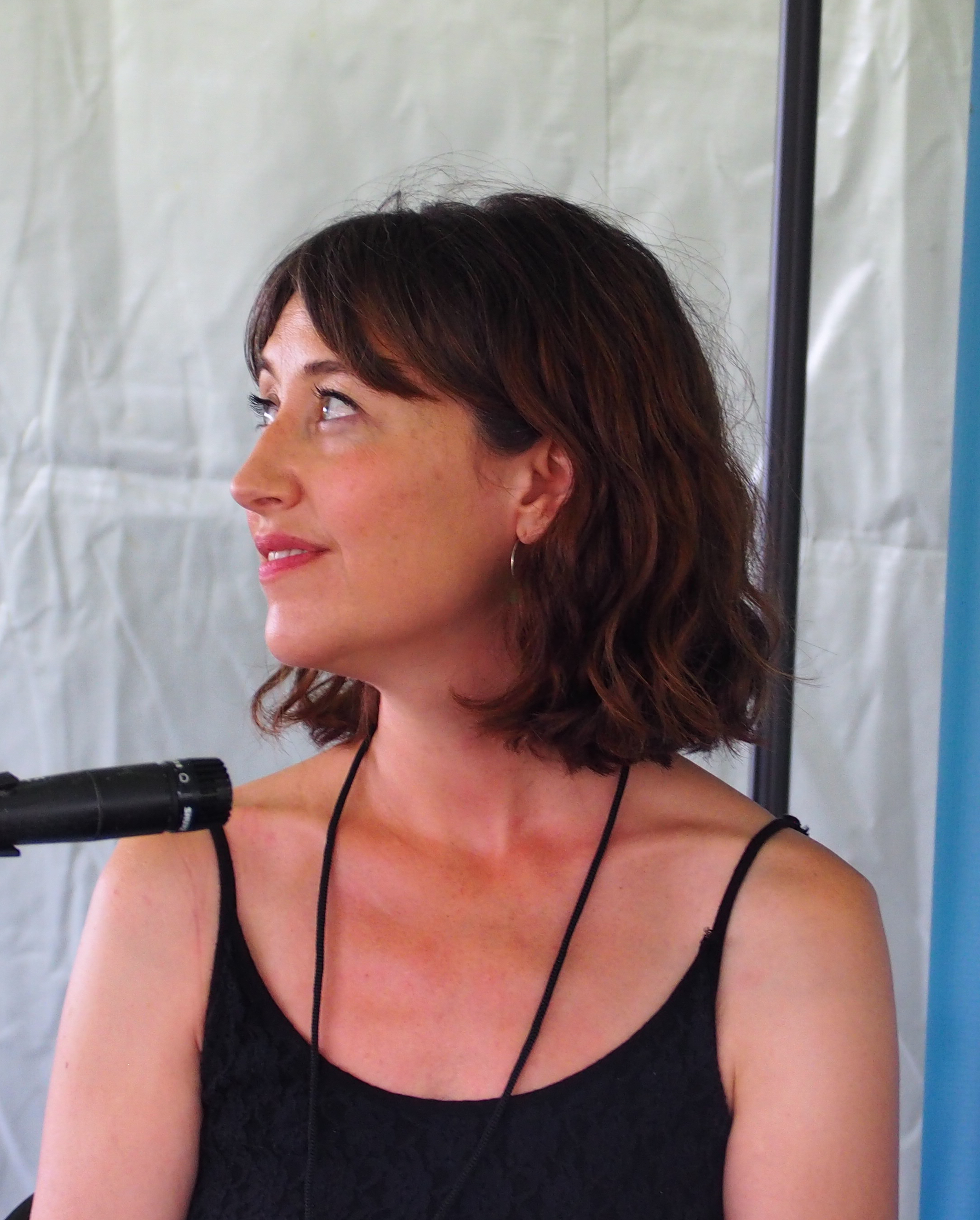
- Born: Galesburg, Illinois, U.S.
- Education: University of Illinois Urbana-Champaign; Northwestern University Pritzker School of Law (JD)
- Occupations: Writer; lawyer
- Writing career
- Notable works: Are You Sleeping (2017); Follow Me (2020)
- Website: kathleenbarber.com

Kathleen Barber is an American writer and non-practicing lawyer. Television rights to her 2017 debut novel Are You Sleeping were sold to Hello Sunshine, and a series called "Truth Be Told", based on the book, was produced for Apple TV+ and debuted in December 2019.

Barber was raised in Galesburg, Illinois. She earned a Bachelor's degree at University of Illinois, where she was initiated into Alpha Gamma Delta, and her J.D. at the Northwestern University School of Law. She worked for a number of years as an attorney in firms in Chicago and New York, where she focused her practice on bankruptcy law.

Barber describes how she had been writing, as a hobby, for years, but the decision she and her husband made to quit their jobs, and travel around the world, triggered her completion of Are You Sleeping. Barber said that she was inspired by the Serial podcast. Her novel focuses around a podcast host, whose investigations turns up evidence of a wrongful conviction.

The Galesburg Register-Mail reported Barber's follow-up novel, Follow Me, would also be a mystery, revolving around social media. It was published on February 25, 2020.

== Bibliography ==
- Are You Sleeping? (2017)
- Truth Be Told (2017)
- Follow Me (2020)
- Both Things Are True: A Novel (2025)
- Sisterhood Above All: A #RushTok Novel (2026)
