= Sofia Adamson =

Sofia Adamson (August 24, 1916 – May 19, 2007) was an American who founded the Pacific Asia Museum in Los Angeles, co-founded Adamson University in the Philippines, and worked for General Douglas MacArthur in the Philippines.

== Early life ==
Adamson was born Sofia Demos in Pocatello, Idaho on August 24, 1916, to Marine and Demosthenes (Dan), Greek immigrant parents.

At the age of 3, she moved with her parents to Los Angeles where her father became a wholesale grocery salesman for S. E. Rykoff. He died in 1928. In 1919 Sofia's mother became the first Greek actress to perform in a Hollywood motion picture. Sofia's mother remarried in 1936 to Anthony Xydias, the first Greek silent film producer most noted for making over 100 historical western films. Sofia's education began by attending the Los Angeles public schools, graduating from Los Angeles High School in 1933.

She attended the University of California Los Angeles and graduated with a Bachelor's degree in education in 1937. She married George Athos Adamson in 1939 and moved to the Philippines to co-found Adamson University with his cousins. She is credited with founding Adamson's College of Education.

== War time ==
In 1941, two US Army majors, Poppy Archer and Thomas Trapnell, recruited Sofia to work in General MacArthur's office in the Philippines. She sat a few feet from MacArthur's office and typed the orders he gave to the troops. Sofia remained in Manila after General MacArthur fled the Philippines for Australia and the Japanese gained control of Manila. She lived under Japanese occupation for three years. Due to their Greek heritage, the Adamsons were not imprisoned by the Japanese.

A 1945 Los Angeles Times article stated that she and her husband were "the only two white persons who had a grand seat during the entire surrender, Japanese occupation, and finally the recapture of Manila." During the return of the Americans to liberate Manila, Sofia and her husband were wounded. In her own biography Sophia describes in detail her 2-day grueling ordeal where she and her husband survived numerous shrapnel injuries inflicted by 105 mm. howitzers fired by friendly forces during the Battle for Liberation of Manila. She was wounded in the neck and leg, which required numerous surgeries to regain her walking ability. Sofia was awarded the Purple Heart fifty three years later for these injuries, being one of a very small group of women to be given such an honor. "And believe me," she told a reporter for "ABC World News This Morning," "this award came, and I've forgotten all about the pain."

After recovering from her war injuries in Manila and later in an army hospital in San Francisco, Sofia and George moved back to Pasadena, California, in 1946.

== Civic service ==
Mrs. Adamson became deeply involved in civic groups, including those in the Greek-American community. In 1954 and 1955, she was the president of the Philoptohos Society of St. Anthony Greek Orthodox Church of Pasadena. She then served on the board of directors of the Saint Sophia Greek Orthodox Cathedral from 1950 to 1971. In 1968, she was president of the International Christian Scholarship Foundation and remained a board member until 1971. Most notably, in 1971–72, along with Margaret Palmer, she was a co-founder of and a generous contributor to the Pacific Asia Museum, which showcased the arts and culture of the Pacific Islands. She remained a founding trustee for life and made her last contribution in person just 5 days before she died.

In 1971, she also was a founder of the Philippine Arts Council and in 1984 was the initiator for the Philippine Exhibitions' "100 Years of Philippine Poetry" and supporter of the "100 Years of Philippine Paintings" exhibition during the Olympic Games in Los Angeles. From 1974 to 1975, Sofia was the president of the Central Improvement Association of Pasadena and later became the chairman for Pasadena's Centennial Parade in 1986. In 1982, she became the director of the United Mercantile Bank and Trust in Pasadena and held that position until 1990.

Among her numerous honors, Sofia was awarded "Woman of the Year" in 1971 by the Philoptohos Society of Saint Sophia Cathedral, the 1988 Recognition Day Award from the Woman's Civic League of Pasadena, the Honoree of the Philippine Arts Council of Pacific Asia Museum in 1988, the 1990 Gold Award for Excellence in Community Service from UCLA, Doctor of Education, Honoris Cause from the Adamson University in 1992, the 1992 Gold Crown Lifetime Achievement Award from the Pasadena Arts Council, the Los Angeles Council Boy Scouts Distinguished Citizen Award in 1997 and the Purple Heart in 1998. Sofia was listed in the 1977 Edition of Who's Who of American Women and the 1979 Edition of the World's Who's Who of Women.

== Autobiography ==
In 1982, Sofia wrote her autobiography titled Gods, Angels, Pearls and Roses, which has been published in the United States, the Philippines and Greece; gods refers to her Greek heritage, angels to her childhood in Los Angeles, pearls to Manila, and rosesto her life in Pasadena.

== Death ==
Sofia Adamson died of a heart attack on May 19, 2007, at Huntington Memorial Hospital in Pasadena, California at the age of 90.
