= Thomas J. H. Trapnell =

United States Army general (1902–2002)

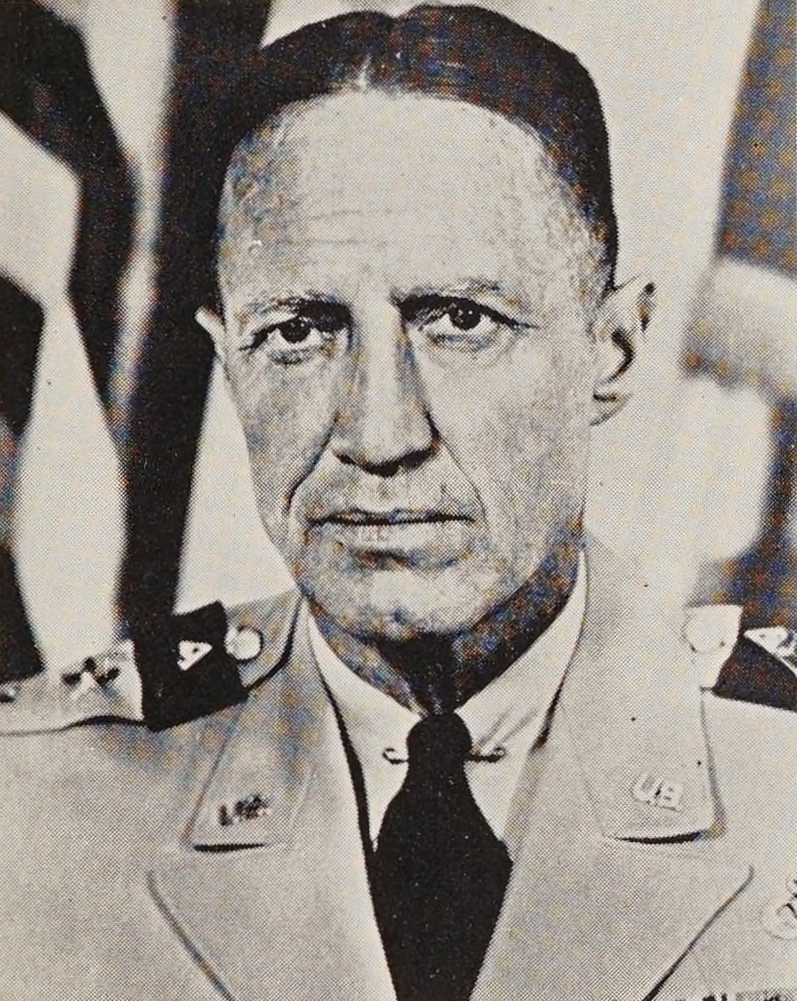
- Trapnell as 4th Armored Division Commander c. 1955
- Born: 23 November 1902; Yonkers, New York, U.S.
- Died: 13 February 2002 (aged 99); Fort Belvoir, Virginia, U.S.
- Burial place: West Point Cemetery
- Military career
- Allegiance: United States
- Branch: United States Army
- Service years: 1927–1962
- Rank: Lieutenant General
- Nicknames: "Trap", "Tom"
- Unit: 26th Cavalry Regiment
- Commands: Third United States Army; XVIII Airborne Corps; Strategic Army Corps; I Corps; 82nd Airborne Division; 4th Armored Division; Military Assistance Advisory Group; 187th Airborne Regimental Combat Team; 505th Parachute Infantry Regiment
- Conflicts: World War II; Battle of the Philippines; Bataan Death March; Korean War; Koje-do Uprising
- Awards: Distinguished Service Cross; Distinguished Service Medal; Silver Star (3); Legion of Merit (4); Bronze Star Medal with "V" Device; Purple Heart

Thomas John Hall "Trap" Trapnell (23 November 1902 – 13 February 2002) was a United States Army lieutenant general. He was a career officer who served in World War II and the Korean War. Trapnell survived the Bataan Death March and the sinking of two transportation ships during World War II, put down a rebellion of prisoners of war in the Korean War, was the top US advisor to the French during the French Indochina War, and advised against US involvement in Vietnam. He rose to the rank of three-star general before his military retirement and, at the time of his death, was the oldest living member of the Philippine Scouts.

== Early life ==
Thomas Trapnell was born on 23 November 1902, in Yonkers, New York, to Joseph Trapnell and Laura Kennedy. The Trapnells are a prosperous and distinguished family originally from the Chesapeake area whose roots stretch back to early Colonial America. One brother, Walter Scott Kennedy Trapnell, rose to the rank of commander in the United States Navy during World War II, while another brother, William Holmes Trapnell, was a prominent attorney. A cousin, Frederick M. Trapnell, was a famous naval test pilot who retired from the navy as a vice admiral. Several other cousins also served as commissioned officers in the armed forces.

== Military career ==
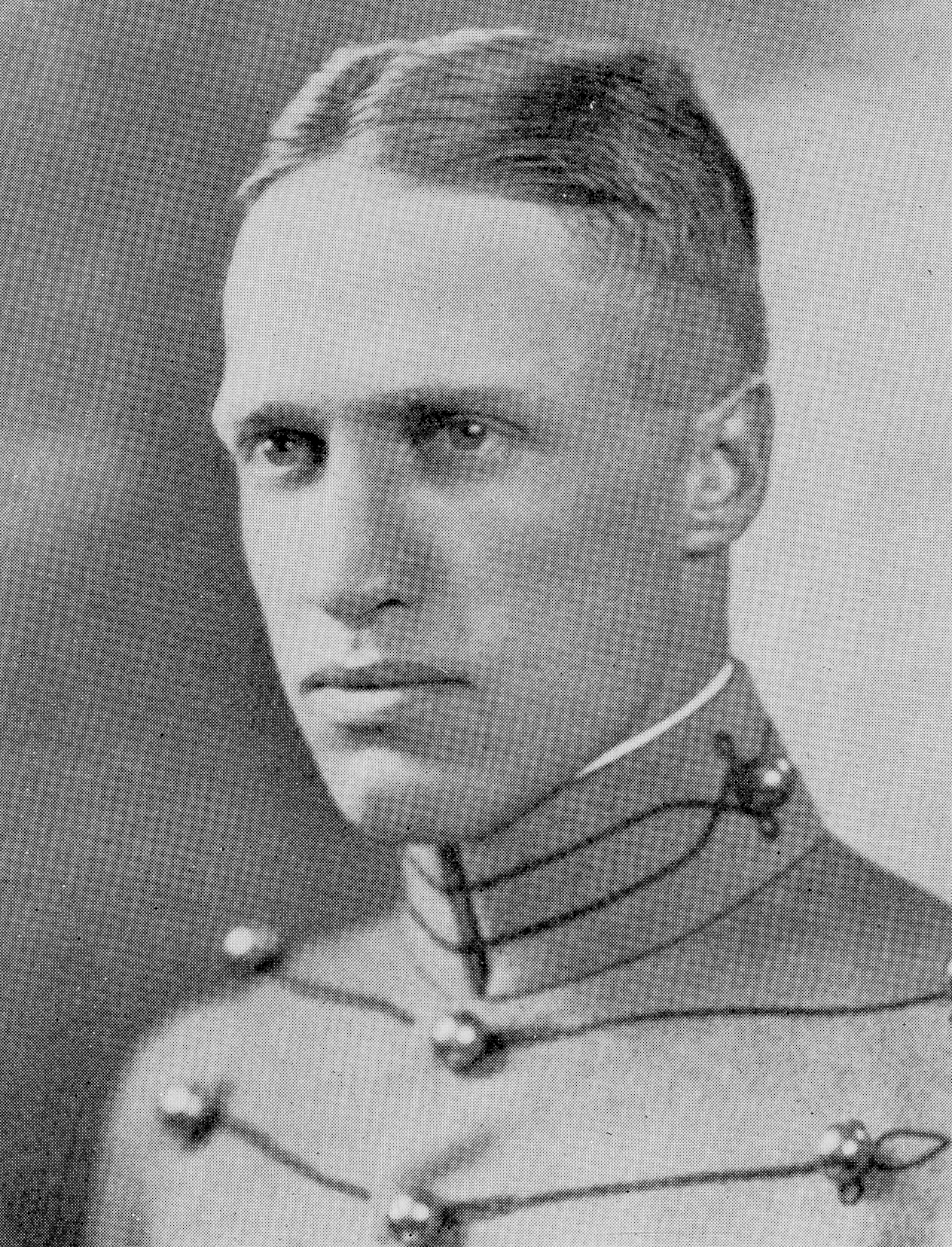
West Point portrait of Trapnell, 1927

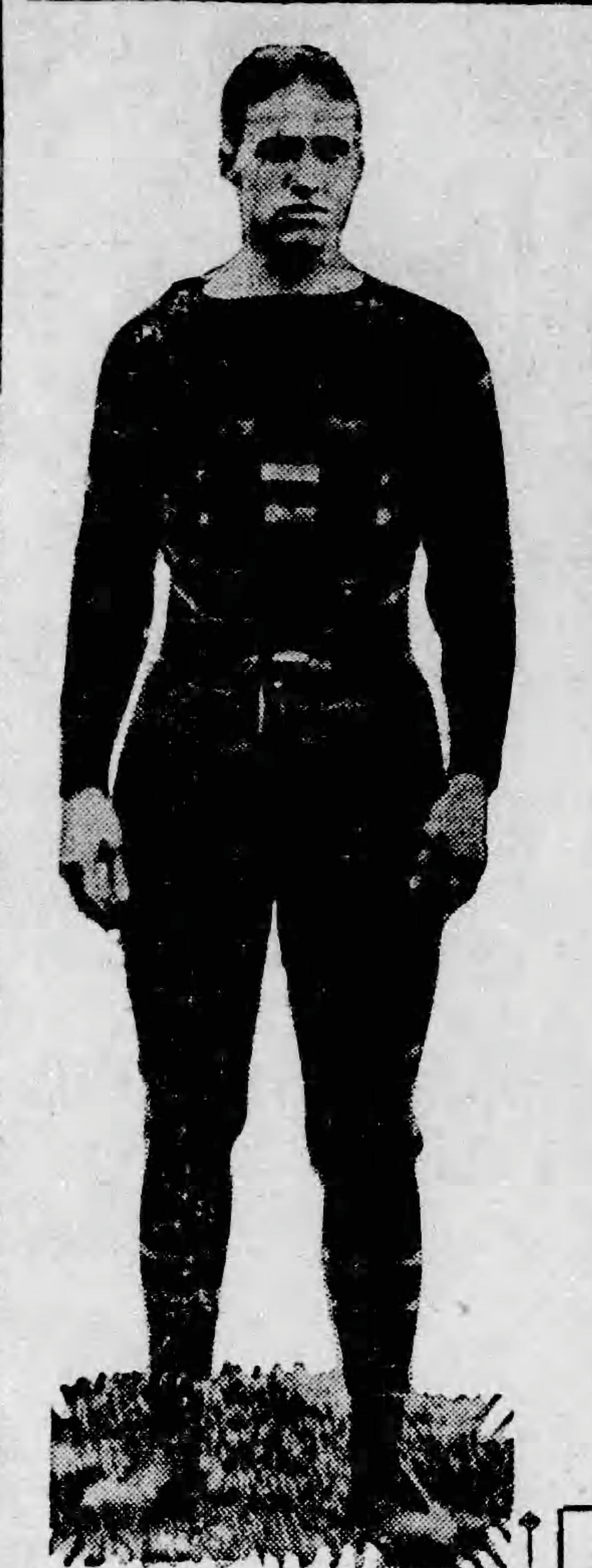
West Point football portrait of Trapnell, circa 1926

After graduating from Episcopal High School in Alexandria, Virginia, in 1923, Trapnell attended the United States Military Academy at West Point, New York. Known as the "warhorse of the West Point backfield," he was an All-America halfback in football—where he teamed with future Hall of Famer Chris Cagle. In 1926, in one of West Point's best years, Trapnell participated in a memorable game against Navy that tied at 21–21. The match was played at Soldier Field in Chicago – the only time either team has played that venue. Army suffered only one loss that entire season (to Notre Dame).

Trapnell was also a top rated lacrosse player who rose to the captaincy of the Army team. His first brush with public notoriety came when his crew defeated the highly rated team from Hobart College captained by his younger brother, William. The characteristically athletic and competitive Trapnells did their best to outshine each other as evidenced by one report:

Captain T. J. Hall Trapnell of the Army team and Captain William H. Trapnell, brothers, engaged in several sharp scrimmages, the first of which resulted in Captain Trapnell of the Army leaving the field under a three-minute penalty.

Trapnell graduated in 1927 and was commissioned as a platoon leader in the 11th Cavalry Regiment. During this time, he served under two future generals Jonathan Wainwright and George Patton. In 1937, he was promoted to captain; two years later he was assigned to the Philippine Scouts.

While in the Philippines, Trapnell was instrumental in recruiting Sofia Adamson, future founder of the Pacific Asia Museum in Los Angeles and co-founder of Adamson University in Manila, to the staff of General Douglas MacArthur. He also became a star polo player. Trapnell was promoted to major and was made XO of the 26th Cavalry Regiment.

=== World War II ===
In 1941, Japan invaded the Philippines, routing combined U.S.-Filipino defensive forces. During their withdrawal into the Bataan Peninsula in December, Trapnell, commanding a unit of the 26th Cavalry, fought a desperate rear-guard action that included the last tactical cavalry charge of the U.S. Army. Using a medical truck to block one of the bridges used by retreating Fil-Am force and setting it afire, Trapnell then remained at this position under constant fire until the bridge was rendered unpassable. Although he had a command car with which to beat a hasty retreat, he instead withdrew slowly with a picked force retrieving wounded soldiers along the way. For this engagement he was awarded the Distinguished Service Cross and commended by Gen. MacArthur: "With complete disregard for his safety, Major Trapnell delayed the hostile advance and set an inspiring example to his entire regiment."

==== Prisoner of war ====
Taken prisoner in April 1942 along with remaining U.S. forces, Trapnell endured months of horrific conditions at Camps O'Donnell and Cabanatuan. While interned, he was promoted to lieutenant colonel. In December 1944, he was transported, along with 1,620 other prisoners, on the notorious prisoner of war hell ship, Oryoku Maru with several U.S. prisoners, including the future Army chief of staff Harold K. Johnson and the future Contropeller of the Army John M. Wright. U.S. dive-bombers, unaware of the ship's status, attacked and sunk the vessel. Trapnell survived only to fall victim to a repeated attack the following year. This time, United States Navy aircraft attacked and disabled the Enoura Maru. He and the approximate 950 survivors of the two sinkings were placed aboard the Brazil Maru but only 550 survived the journey to Japan. In August 1945, Trapnell was liberated from Hoten POW camp in Manchuria by USSR troops. At the time, his once athletic, six-foot frame had been reduced to less than 100 pounds.

=== Interbellum ===
Upon his return to the United States, Trapnell attended the Command and General Staff College, graduating in 1947. Afterward, he completed Airborne School and assumed command of the 505th Parachute Infantry Regiment, 82nd Airborne Division at Fort Bragg, North Carolina. On May 8, 1948, Trapnell led the 505th as part of a record-setting exercise that saw 2,200 paratroopers travel some 500 miles to make a jump at Camp Campbell, Kentucky. He graduated from the Army War College in 1951.

=== Korean War ===
In 1951, Trapnell was promoted to the rank of brigadier general and placed in command of the 187th Airborne Regimental Combat Team. In November of that year, the 187th made a "simulated combat drop", landing 3,000 troops and 100,000 lbs of equipment in South Korea during 'Operation Showoff,' a demonstration of wartime airlift capability. From May to June, 1952, the 187th under Trapnell was instrumental in suppressing the rebellion of 80,000 Chinese and North Korean prisoners at the Geoje POW camp. Some 40 prisoners were killed during the uprising which had been fomented by communist leaders attempting to disrupt truce negotiations.

=== Indochina ===
From 1952 to 1954, Major General Trapnell headed the U.S. advisory mission in French Indochina, leaving just before Ho Chi Minh's victory at Dien Bien Phu. While serving as the chief advisor, he issued a series of reports to his superiors in which he predicted that the French would not be able to defeat the communist insurgency. Trapnell was replaced by Maj. Gen. John W. O'Daniel and returned to the United States for a succession of commands: the recently reactivated 4th Armored Division at Ft. Hood, Texas from 1954 to 1955 and the 82nd Airborne Division from 1955 to 1956.

Trapnell returned to South Korea in 1958 commanding I Corps for two years before becoming the Chief of Staff to Gen. Isaac White, Commander-in-Chief, United States Army Pacific. In 1960, after briefly commanding Third U.S. Army at Ft. McPherson, Georgia, he took command of both the XVIII Airborne Corps and the Strategic Army Corps at Ft. Bragg. While there, Trapnell presided over the dedication of the Airborne Trooper statue in September 1961. He also strongly advocated for the joint forces reaction force that became Strike Command.

=== South Vietnam ===
In 1961, Lieutenant General Trapnell was in South Vietnam, where he advised President John F. Kennedy against U.S. involvement. Presciently gauging the eventual swing of U.S. public opinion and weighing the organizational success and popularity of Ho Chi Minh, Trapnell concluded that the Vietnamese communists were waging a "clever war of attrition." While he supported holding the line against communist expansion in Asia, he nevertheless believed that a "military solution in Indochina [was] not possible."

Trapnell's final command came in 1961. In that year, SAC and Tactical Air Command were unified as Strike Command; Trapnell once again assumed command of Third Army. He retired in 1962.

Trapnell later served as an advisory board member of the Center for Internee Rights in Florida advocating for just treatment of US prisoners of war and fair compensation from holding nations.

== Family ==
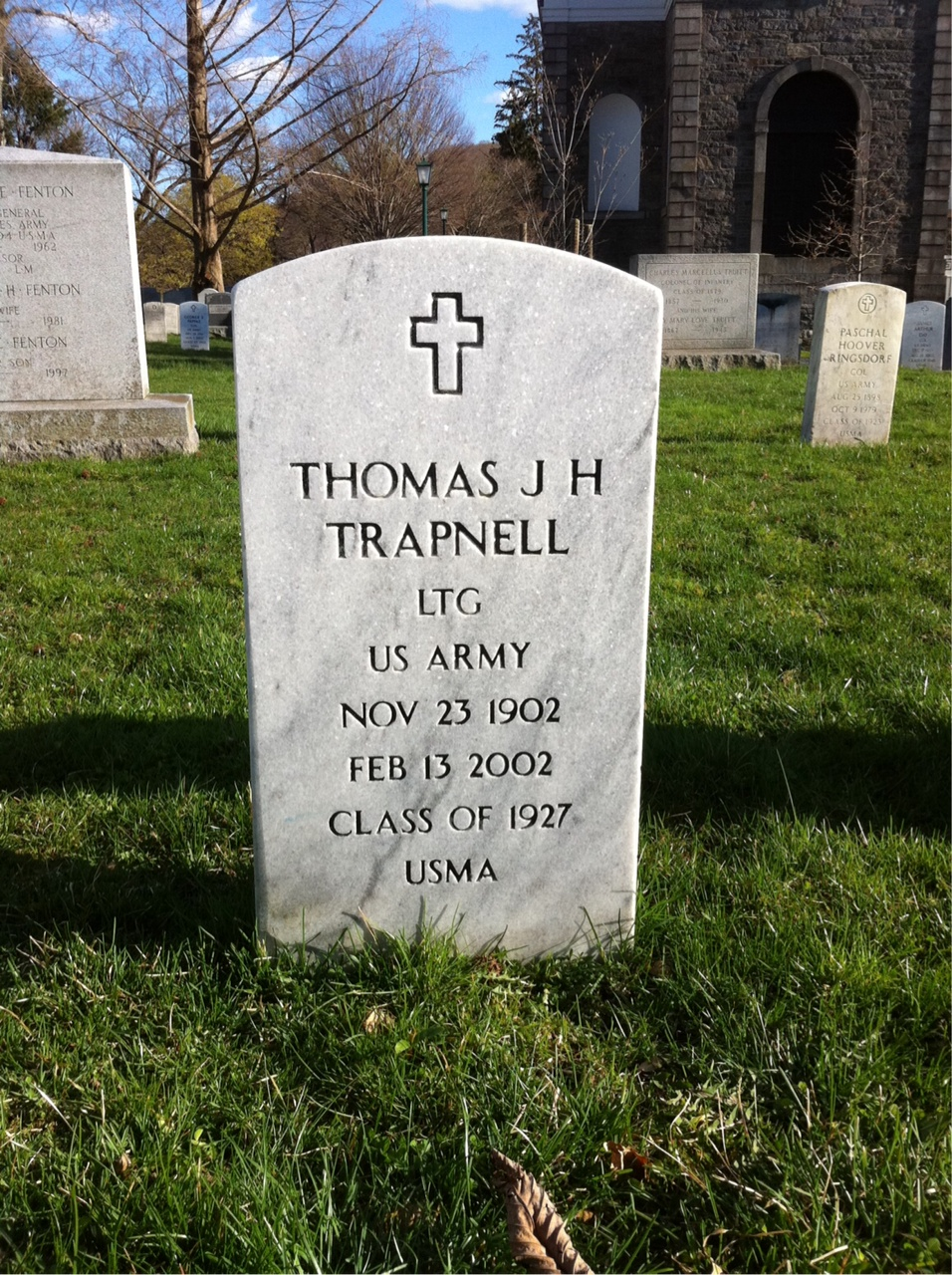
Grave at West Point cemetery

Trapnell was married to his first wife, Alys Snow, from 1929 until her death in 1953. Alys had relocated to the Philippines with her husband when he was posted there but returned to the United States "when the Army wives were evacuated" in May 1942. His second marriage, to Elizabeth Elder, lasted from 1956 to her death in 2001. He had no children.

Like many other males in his family, Trapnell was known as "Trap" from his last name. As such, Trapnell became the first person whose nickname appeared in an official War Department record (Communiqué 69):

From his field headquarters in the Philippines General MacArthur today announced the award of the Distinguished Service Cross to Major Thomas J. H. ("Trap") Trapnell, cavalry, for extraordinary heroism in action.

Trapnell died of heart failure at the Fairfax retirement facility at Ft. Belvoir, Virginia on 13 February 2002. He was buried with full military honors at West Point Cemetery.

== Military awards ==
Trapnell's military decorations and awards include:

Badges

Master Parachutist Badge

Decorations

Distinguished Service Cross
Army Distinguished Service Medal
Silver Star with two bronze oak leaf clusters
Legion of Merit with three bronze oak leaf clusters
Bronze Star Medal with "V" Device
Purple Heart
Prisoner of War Medal

Unit Award

Army Presidential Unit Citation

Service Medals

American Defense Service Medal with bronze service star
American Campaign Medal
Asiatic-Pacific Campaign Medal with silver campaign star
World War II Victory Medal
Army of Occupation Medal with "Japan" clasp
National Defense Service Medal with one bronze service star
Korean Service Medal with three campaign stars
Armed Forces Expeditionary Medal with two service stars

Foreign Awards

Philippine Defense Medal
Croix de Guerre with Palm (France)
Vietnam Army Distinguished Service Order (1st Class)
Vietnam Gallantry Cross with Palm
Philippine Republic Presidential Unit Citation
Republic of Korea Presidential Unit Citation
Vietnam Presidential Unit Citation
United Nations Korea Medal
Vietnam Campaign Medal
Republic of Korea War Service Medal

== Notes ==
Military offices
Preceded by Paul D. Adams	Commanding General of the Third United States Army; 1960–1961	Succeeded by Hamilton H. Howze (acting)
Preceded by Herbert B. Powell	Commanding General of the Third United States Army; 1960	Succeeded by Paul D. Adams
