= Hoten Camp =

Building in Hoten prisoner-of-war camp, China

Coordinates: 41°48′00″N 123°26′00″E

Shenyang World War II Allied POW Camp Ruins Exhibition Hall
- Simplified Chinese: 沈阳二战盟军战俘营遗址陈列馆
- Traditional Chinese: 瀋陽二戰盟軍戰俘營遺址陳列館
Transcriptions
Standard Mandarin
- Hanyu Pinyin: Shěnyáng èrzhàn méng jūn zhànfú yíng yízhǐ chénliè guǎn

Fengtian Prisoner (of War) Camp
- Simplified Chinese: 奉天俘虏收容所
- Traditional Chinese: 奉天俘虜收容所
Transcriptions
Standard Mandarin
- Hanyu Pinyin: Fèngtiān fúlǔ shōuróng suǒ

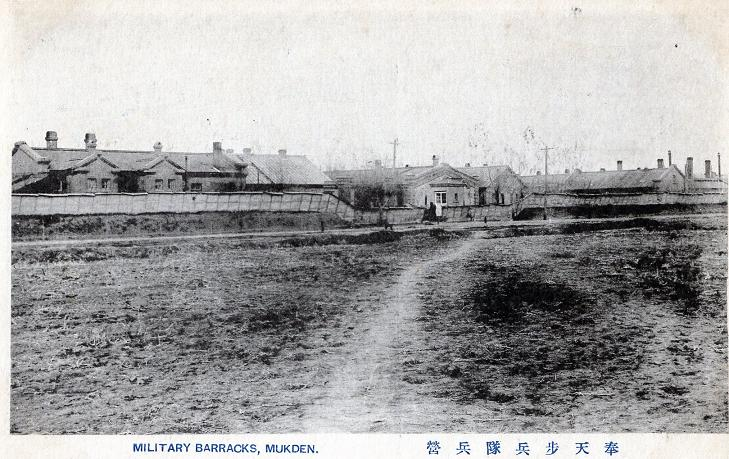
Military camp in Mukden

The Hoten Camp was a World War II prisoner of war camp in Manchuria. The camp was located near Mukden (now Shenyang) and was initially called Mukden POW Camp. Archival records indicate 1,420 Allied prisoners were held here, 1,193 of whom were liberated, and 224 of whom did not survive their captivity. Prisoners at the camp included soldiers from the United States, the United Kingdom, the Netherlands, Australia, and New Zealand.

== Medical experimentation ==
The camp was associated with Unit 731, a biological weapons group of the Imperial Japanese Army. Poor conditions, lack of food and proper medical attention, and medical experiments conducted on the prisoners resulted in many deaths.

== Notable prisoners ==
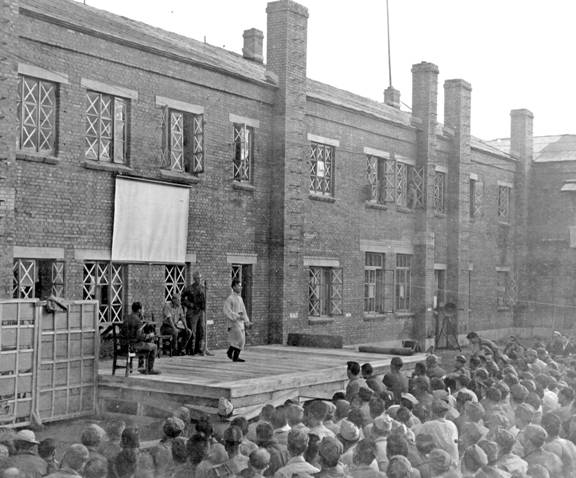
Liberation of Mukden POW camp

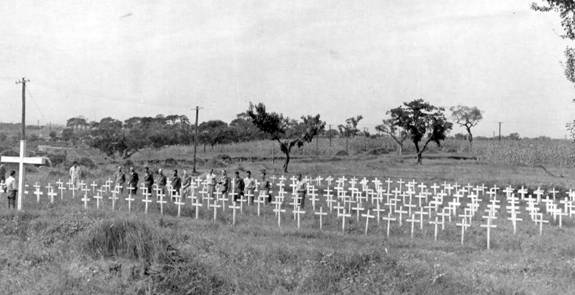
Cemetery of POWs after the liberation

Prisoners detained at the camp included Thomas J. H. Trapnell and Colonel Edwin H. Johnson, as well as former Governor of Hong Kong Mark Aitchison Young.

Robert Peaty, a Major in the Royal Army Ordnance Corps, was the senior ranking allied officer. During his captivity, he kept a secret diary. He was interviewed by the Imperial War Museum in 1981, and the audio recording tape reels are in the IWM's archives. Peaty recounts: “I was reminded of Dante’s Inferno - abandon hope all ye who enter here…” His diary recorded the regular injections of infectious diseases that were disguised as preventative vaccinations. His entry for January 30, 1943 notes “Everyone received a 5 cc Typhoid-paratyphoid A inoculation.” The February 23, 1943 entry read “Funeral service for 142 dead. 186 have died in 5 days, all Americans.”

== Liberation ==
In August 1945, the camp was liberated by Soviet troops (262nd Rifle Division, 113th Infantry Corps, 39th Army) and a small OSS team.
