= Iron Mike =

Statues commemorating servicemen of the United States

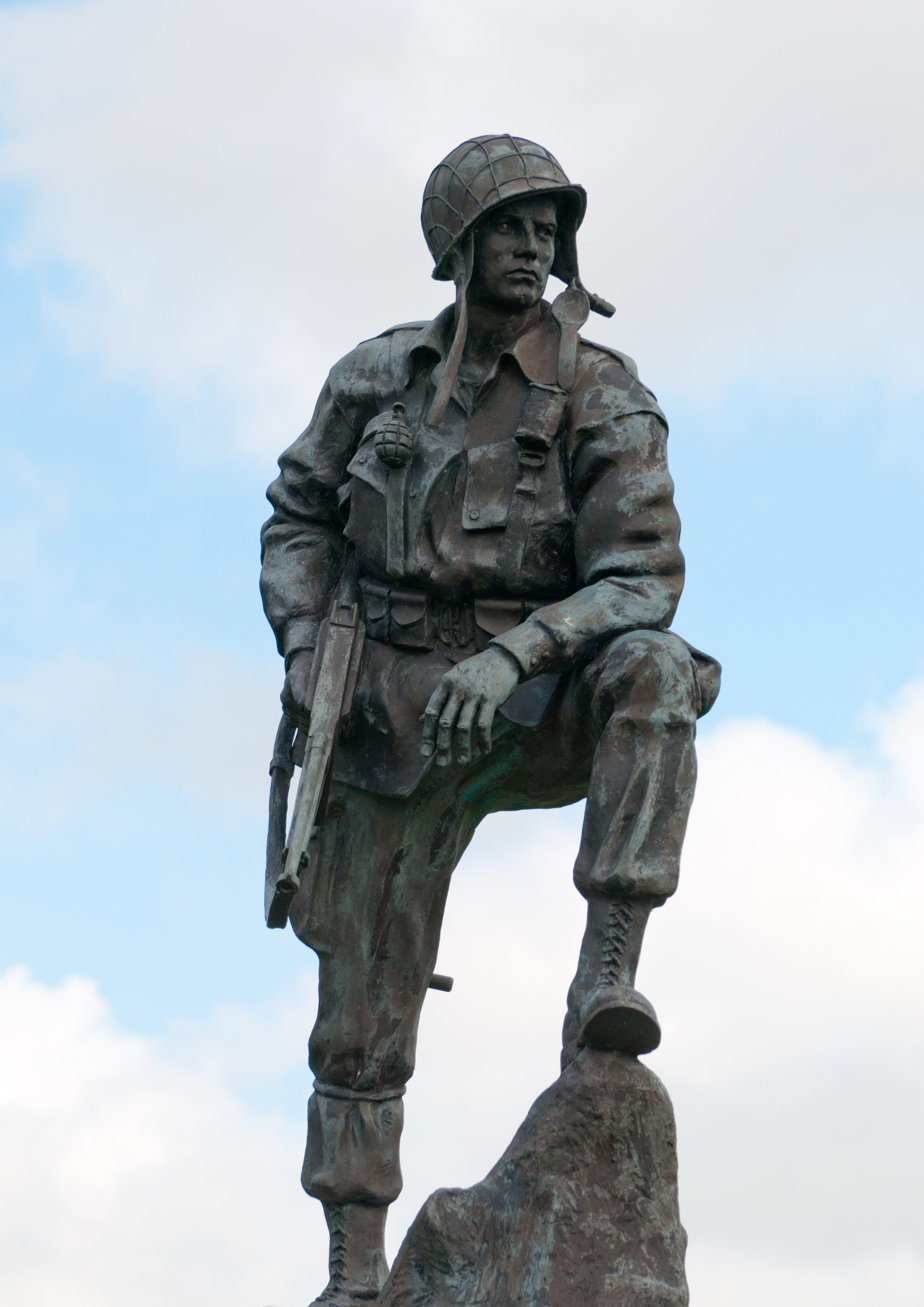
Iron Mike statue next to La Fiere bridge in Normandy, France.

Iron Mike is the de facto name of various monuments commemorating servicemen of the United States military. The term "Iron Mike" is uniquely American slang used to refer to men who are especially tough, brave, and inspiring; it was originally a nautical term for a gyrocompass, used to keep a ship on an unwavering course. Because the use of the slang term was popular in the first half of the 20th century, many statues from that period acquired the Iron Mike nickname, and over the generations the artists' titles were largely forgotten. Even official military publications and classroom texts tend to prefer the nickname to the original titles.

== Quantico, Virginia ==
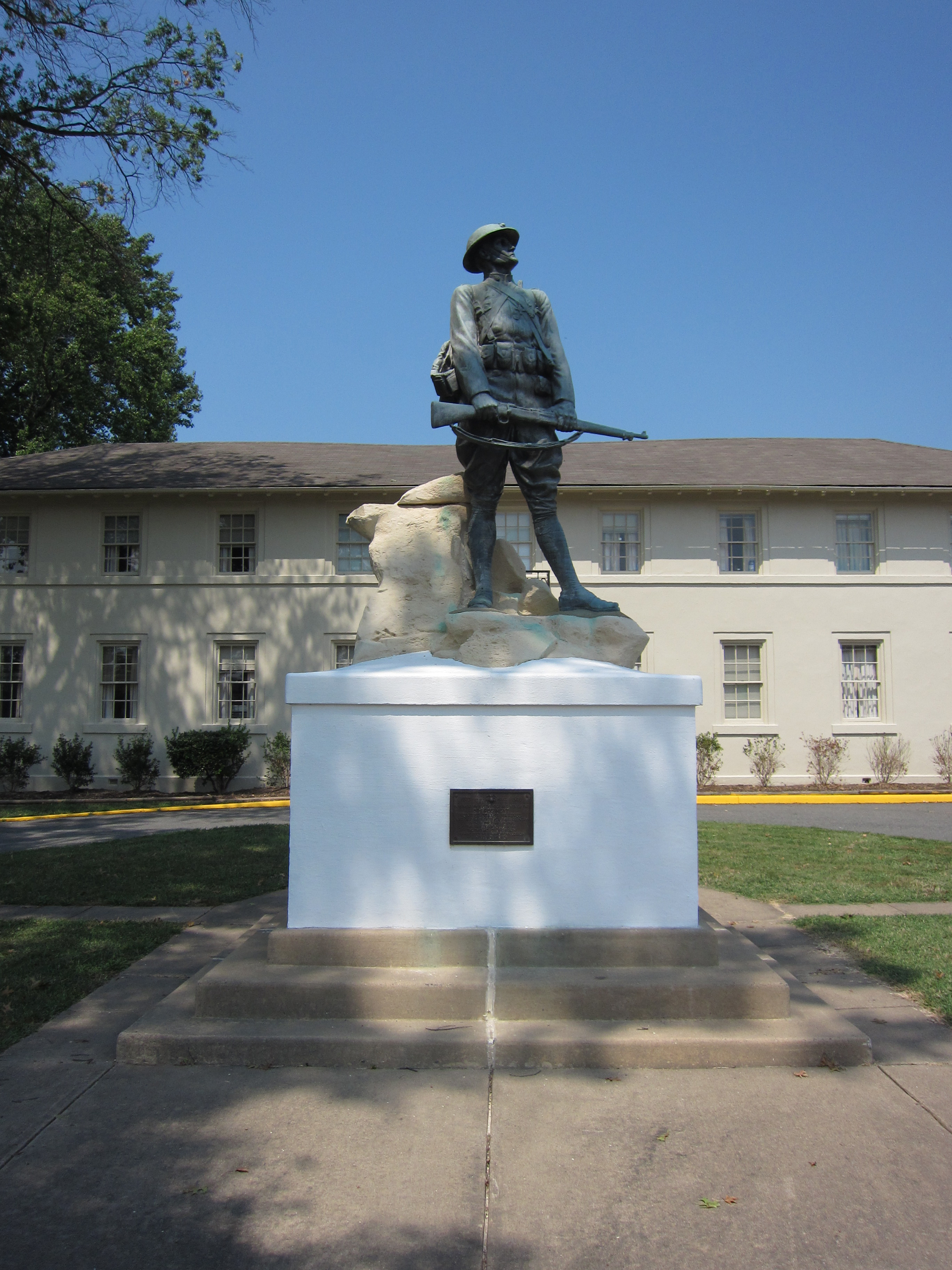
Crusading for Right (1918) at Marine Corps Base Quantico, Virginia.

Quantico, Virginia’s Iron Mike is officially titled Crusading for Right. It depicts a World War I Marine holding a 1903 Springfield rifle, wearing a pack with a bayonet.

At the end of the war, US Army General John J. Pershing commissioned the French sculptor Charles Raphaël Peyre (sometimes Raphael Charles, 1872—1949) to commemorate the service of the US Army’s "doughboys". The sculptor, unaware of the differences between the branches of service, used a Marine private as a model and included the Eagle, Globe and Anchor insignia on the helmet. When Pershing saw the finished product, he insisted that the insignia be removed. The artist would not allow his work to be censored, so the army declined to buy the statue.

Finally, Marine Corps General Smedley Butler raised enough money to buy the statue and had it installed in front of the headquarters building at Marine Corps Base Quantico, Virginia. The statue was begun in 1918 and first exhibited at the Exposition des Beaux Arts of the Grand Palaise des Champs-Élysées, in Paris in May 1919. Marine Officers and Enlisted donated money to purchase the statue, and it was sited in front of the Base Headquarters, Building 1019, in Quantico, Virginia, some 35 miles from DC and a bit off the tourist trail. Three tablets were erected in the memory of the officers and men of the 6th Machine Gun Battalion, 5th Regiment and 6th Regiment, United States Marines, "who gave their lives for their country in the World War in 1918" by the Thomas Roberts Reath, Marine Post No. 186, American Legion, on November 10, 1921. On December 8, 1921, the statue was dedicated.

Today, the original statue stands at the Marine Corps Base Quantico in front of Butler Hall, home of the Marine Corps Training and Education Command. A reproduction with the name "Iron Mike" on its pedestal stands in front of the National Museum of the Marine Corps in Triangle, Virginia.

== Belleau, France ==
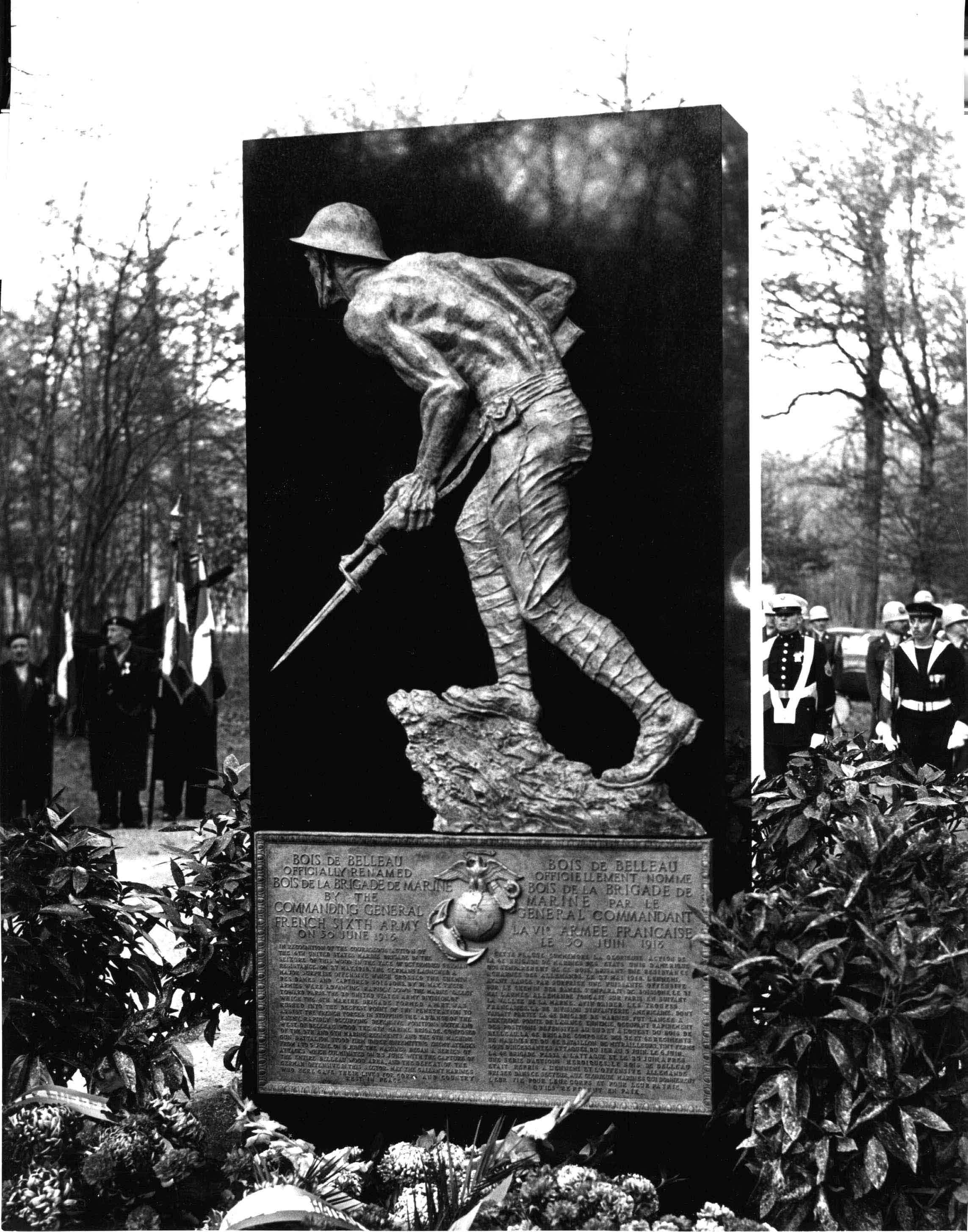
The Marine Memorial at Belleau Wood

The Iron Mike at the Aisne-Marne American Cemetery and Memorial at Belleau Wood battlefield is a bronze relief on granite, simply entitled The Marine Memorial. It was sculpted by Felix Weihs de Weldon, the artist who had earlier designed the giant Marine Corps War Memorial in Washington, D.C. The monument was erected in the heart of the forest to honor the 5th and 6th Marine Regiments of the 4th Marine Brigade which fought there for twenty days in June 1918. Dedicated on November 18, 1955, this Iron Mike is the only memorial in Europe dedicated solely to the United States Marines.

Below the statue is a commemorative plaque with a large Eagle, Globe, and Anchor. The plaque includes a brief history of the battle with text in both English and French. The four ton monolith of bon accord granite, the same as used in the base of the Marine Corps War Memorial, came from Karlshamn, Sweden. Together with the seven foot tall Marine with bayonet, admired by the senior French present at its dedication as "very powerful and forceful ... fully embodying the spirit of the Marines," and accompanying plaque, the monument weighs about 9,000 pounds (4,100 kg).

The battle was the bloodiest of the U.S. Marine Corps' history at that point and the 5th and 6th Regiments were awarded the French Fourragère and Croix de Guerre. Following the war, as noted on the plaque, the French government renamed the forest "Bois de la Brigade de Marine." Officiating at the monument's dedication ceremony was then Commandant of the Marine Corps, General Lemuel C. Shepherd Jr., who had fought and was wounded at Belleau Wood 37 years earlier. Also in attendance, were three other Marine General Officers who had also fought at Belleau Wood. Together the four Generals, Shepherd, William A. Worton, Gerald C. Thomas, and Alfred H. Noble, made for a unique gathering of senior Marines in Europe.

== Parris Island, South Carolina ==
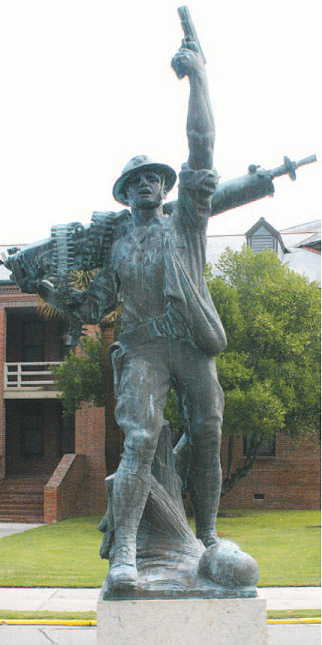
Parris Island's Iron Mike after relocation

Parris Island's Iron Mike is depicted carrying a Maxim machine gun over his right shoulder and an M1911 pistol in his raised left hand, created as a memorial to all of the Parris Island graduates who were killed during World War I.

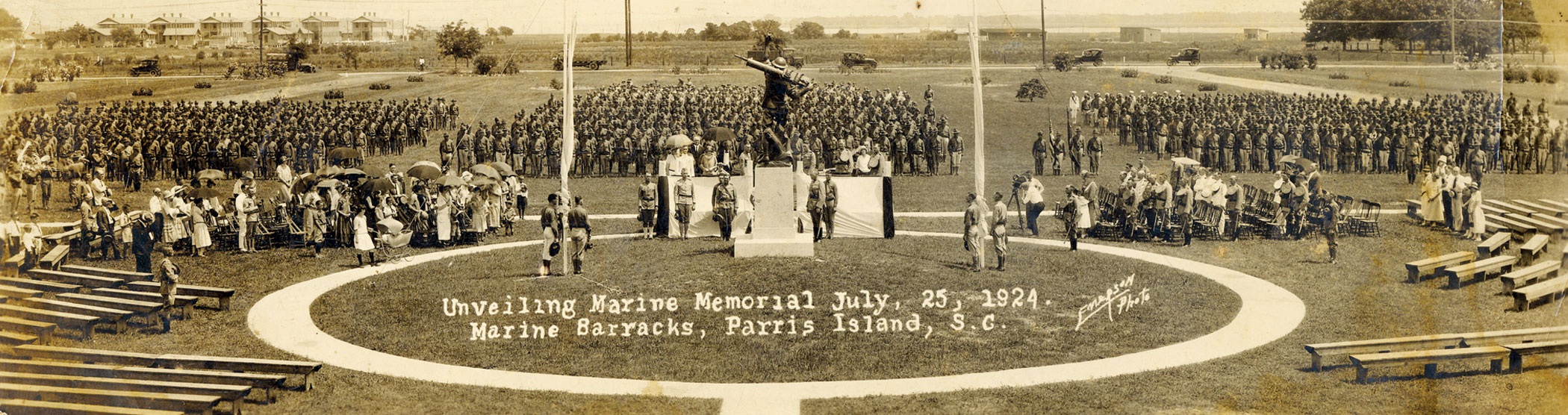
Parris Island's Iron Mike dedication in 1924

The statue itself is approximately life-sized, standing about 8 feet (2.4 m) high from the heel of his boot to the muzzle of his pistol, and is mounted on a 5-foot (1.5 m) granite base. It was created by Robert Ingersoll Aitken, the sculptor of the pediment on the United States Supreme Court Building, and cast in bronze. Officially entitled Monument to U.S. Marines, this Iron Mike was dedicated in 1924 in a ceremony presided over by Commandant John A. Lejeune. Due to changes and construction around Parris Island, Iron Mike was relocated in 1941 and it now stands in front of the Parris Island Headquarters and Service Battalion Barracks.

The bronze plaque, mounted on the base, reads: "In memory of the men of Parris Island who gave their lives in the World War, erected by their comrades."

== Fort Bragg, North Carolina ==
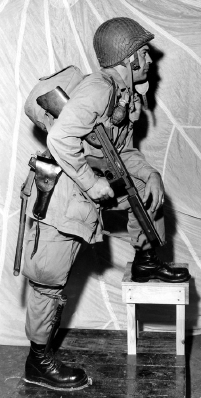
Sgt. Major Runyon posing for the sculptor

Fort Bragg’s The Airborne Trooper is the newest Iron Mike statue. Known as the "Home of the Airborne," Fort Bragg hosts the 82nd Airborne Division as well as the XVIII Airborne Corps. Sculpted by Leah Hiebert in 1960 and 1961, using Sergeant Major James Runyon as a model, the statue depicts a World War II-era Airborne trooper with a Thompson submachine gun at the ready. The vision of former XVIII Airborne Corps Commander, Lt. Gen. Robert F. Sink, the statue was not named for any one man or unit, but rather dedicated to all paratroopers; past, present and future. Omar Bradley, Matthew Ridgway, Anthony McAuliffe, Maxwell Taylor, Thomas Trapnell, and William Westmoreland were among the fifteen generals who attended the dedication ceremony. Originally installed at the southern entrance on Bragg Boulevard, the Airborne Trooper was moved to the traffic circle in front of the post headquarters in 1979 to prevent vandalism and increase visibility. (35.14820°N 78.99095°W)

Fort Bragg’s original Iron Mike stood 16 feet 4 inches (4.98 m) tall from boot heel to the top of his helmet and weighed 3,235 pounds (1,467 kg). The original statue was made from polyester strips dipped in epoxy and stretched over a steel frame. Due to deterioration, it was replaced in 2005 with a bronze version. The original was refurbished and was moved to the Airborne & Special Operations Museum in Fayetteville, North Carolina on June 14, 2010. (35.05655°N 78.88551°W)

A digital model of the original was created and used as a guide for the new version to ensure faithful replication of Hiebert's design. A ceremony to dedicate the new version was held September 23, 2005.

President George W. Bush spoke in front of the statue on July 4, 2006.

=== La Fiere replica ===
A replica of The Airborne Trooper stands above the bridge at La Fiere in Normandy, where on June 6–9, 1944 members of 505th Parachute Infantry Regiment and 325th Glider Infantry Regiment, both elements of the 82nd Airborne Division, fought a fierce battle against repeated German attacks. The small stone bridge over the Merderet River was a key point for the Germans to take in order to break up the American landing at Utah Beach, while at the same time being key to the Americans so that they could expand their beachhead in Normandy. Over the course of the battle, the Germans attacked the lightly armed Americans with both infantry and armor but were never able to cross the bridge. The monument was unveiled on June 7, 1997.

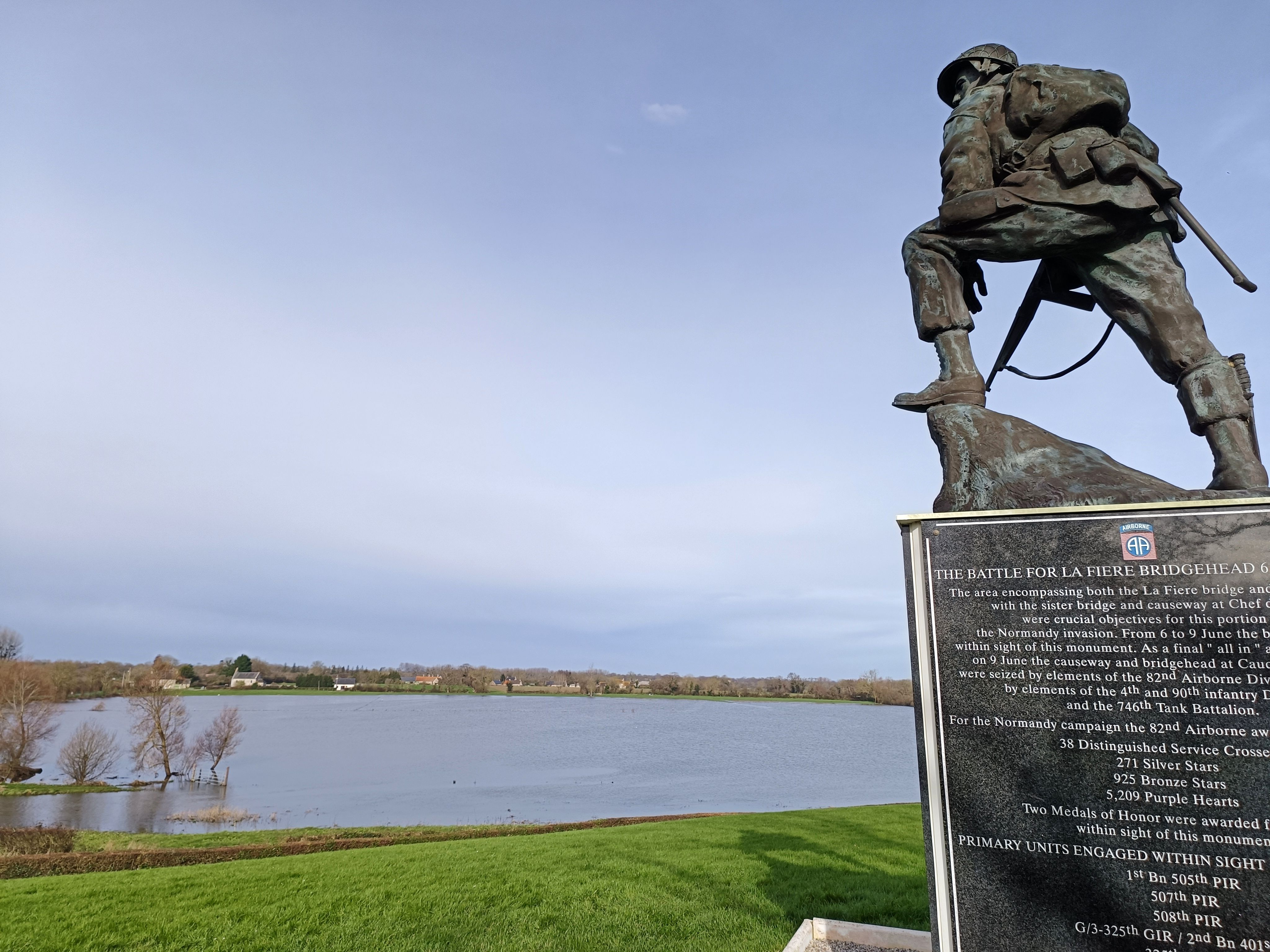
La Fiere replica

== University of Minnesota, Twin Cities ==
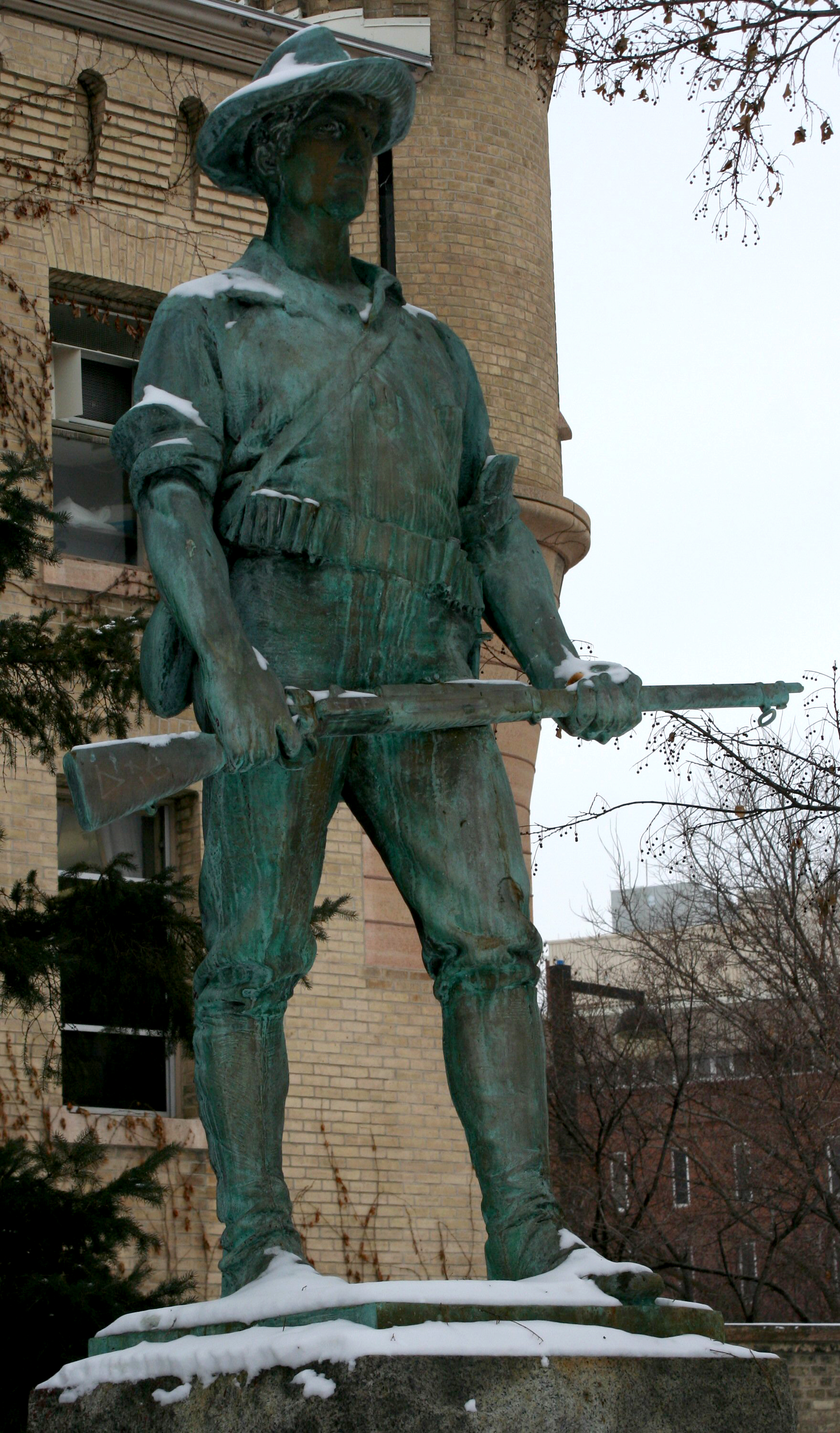
The Hiker

The University of Minnesota's Twin Cities campus also has a statue known as Iron Mike. Designed by Theo Alice Ruggles Kitson and installed in 1906, the statue stands in front of the armory at 15 Church Street. Also known as the "Student Soldier Memorial", this Iron Mike is a monument to alumni who served in the Spanish–American War. The statue is 9 feet (2.7 m) tall and stands on a 6-foot (1.8 m) granite base, depicting a soldier clad in a period uniform with a campaign hat and a Krag-Jørgensen rifle.

The actual name of the sculpture is The Hiker. Thirty-nine copies of Kitson's Hiker are still in existence, spread across the United States from Deering Oaks Park in Portland, Maine to Capitol Park in Sacramento, California. The University of Minnesota's "Iron Mike" is one of the oldest Hikers in the U.S., possibly rivaled by one in Allentown, Pennsylvania.

== Others ==
There are many other similar statues throughout the United States, most of them World War I monuments. The most well-known is a sculpture by Ernest Moore Viquesney entitled Spirit of the American Doughboy. While the original statue design itself never received the nickname "Iron Mike", residents of some of the locales in which the copies can be found refer to their local monuments as such.

The U.S. Army Infantry Center at Fort Benning has a World War II monument entitled Follow Me. It is often mistakenly referred to as "Iron Mike."

Fort Lewis, Washington, is home to a statue entitled The Infantryman, which is often referred to as "Iron Mike". Located at Tacoma Avenue and 41st Division Road (since 1992), and set with a backdrop of Mount Rainier, the 18-foot-tall (5.5 m) statue was erected in 1964 to memorialize the soldiers of the 4th Infantry Division. Its design, an early Vietnam-era U.S. infantryman equipped with the M14 rifle, was inspired by the "Iron Mike" at Fort Bragg, and is made from the same fiberglass-on-iron as the original there. Despite a history centered on infantry training, it was the first monument on Fort Lewis dedicated to the infantryman.

In 1935 the Spirit of the CCC, later nicknamed Iron Mike, was the first major statue honoring the Civilian Conservation Corps. Designed by Works Progress Administration Federal Art Project sculptor, John Palo-Kangas, the statue was typical of the art-deco style of that period. Unveiled by President Franklin D. Roosevelt at CCC Company 1917 in Griffith Park, Los Angeles, California, the original statue has since disappeared, but was replaced in 1993 with a bronze reproduction sculpted by Jim Brothers.

Marine Corps Logistics Base Barstow has a ridge that is used during training that is nicknamed "Iron Mike" due to the steepness of the terrain and determination it takes to run up without stopping. Another running course at Marine Corps Base Camp Pendleton, Camp Horno, shares the name as well.

== See also ==
- The Three Soldiers (Vietnam War)
- Korean War Veterans Memorial
- Spirit of the American Doughboy (World War I)
- Marine Corps War Memorial
- The Special Warfare Memorial Statue (Also known as Bronze Bruce)
