= Truth Be Told (2019 TV series) =

American drama television series

- Season 1 promotional poster
- Genre: Legal drama; Crime drama
- Created by: Nichelle Tramble Spellman
- Based on: Are You Sleeping by Kathleen Barber
- Starring: Octavia Spencer; Michael Beach; Mekhi Phifer; Merle Dandridge; Tracie Thoms; Haneefah Wood; Ron Cephas Jones; Rico E. Anderson; Season 1: Lizzy Caplan; Aaron Paul; Elizabeth Perkins; Hunter Doohan; Season 2: Kate Hudson; David Lyons; Katherine LaNasa; Tami Roman; Season 3: Gabrielle Union; Mychala Faith Lee
- Composer: John Paesano
- Country of origin: United States
- Original language: English
- No. of seasons: 3
- No. of episodes: 28

Production
- Executive producers: Octavia Spencer; Nichelle Tramble Spellman; Reese Witherspoon; Lauren Neustadter; Peter Chernin; Jenno Topping; Ben Watkins; Kristen Campo; Victor Hsu; Leonard Dick; Mikkel Nørgaard; Brian Clisham; Maisha Closson
- Camera setup: Single-camera
- Running time: 39–52 minutes
- Production companies: Orit Entertainment; Hello Sunshine; Chernin Entertainment; Endeavor Content; With an N (seasons 1–2); The 51 (season 3)

Original release
- Network: Apple TV+
- Release: December 6, 2019 – March 24, 2023

Truth Be Told is an American legal/crime drama television series. The series was created by Nichelle Tramble Spellman for Apple TV+ and is based on Kathleen Barber's 2017 debut novel Are You Sleeping. Spellman also acts as executive producer and writes for the show. Unlike the book, Poppy Parnell (Octavia Spencer) plays the main role, as a podcaster who revisits the case that made her famous with the hope of finally getting to the truth.

The series premiered on December 6, 2019. The soundtrack, composed by John Paesano, was released by Lakeshore Records on the same day. New York's Paley Center also aired episodes of the show.

The second season began in August 2021. In December 2021, the series was renewed for a third season, which premiered on January 20, 2023 and concluded on March 24, 2023. In April 2023, the series was canceled after three seasons.

== Premise ==
In season 1, Oakland journalist Poppy Parnell restarts the true crime podcast that made her famous and reopens the 1999 murder case of Stanford professor Chuck Buhrman after new evidence suggests Warren Cave, the man she helped put behind bars, was wrongly convicted.

In season 2, Poppy investigates the murder of a controversial filmmaker at the request of his wife Micah, an equally controversial wellness guru whose friendship with Poppy compromises her judgment.

In season 3, Poppy works with a high school principal to investigate the disappearances of several young black girls in Oakland whose cases lack mainstream media attention. Meanwhile, a mayoral candidate uses a white girl's disappearance for his campaign.

== Cast and characters ==
=== Main ===
- Octavia Spencer as Poppy Parnell, an investigative reporter behind a hit true-crime podcast. She uses the last name "Scoville" in Season 3, in which she learns she is, in actuality, the illegitimate daughter of Alexander Michael Troy and the late Elinor Parnell. Desiree and Cydie are her maternal half-sisters.
- Aaron Paul as Warren Cave (season 1), a convicted murderer and subject of Poppy's podcasts
  - Hunter Doohan as young Warren Cave (season 1)
- Lizzy Caplan as Josie and Lanie Buhrman (season 1), identical twin sisters whose father was allegedly murdered by Warren Cave
- Elizabeth Perkins as Melanie Cave (season 1), Warren's mother who has been afflicted with lung cancer.
- Michael Beach as Ingram Rhoades (season 1 - 2), Poppy's husband
- Mekhi Phifer as Markus Killebrew, a former detective and long time friend of Poppy
- Merle Dandridge as Zarina Killebrew, Markus' wife
- Tracie Thoms as Desiree Scoville, Poppy's younger maternal half-sister
- Haneefah Wood as Cydie Scoville, Poppy's youngest maternal half-sister
- Ron Cephas Jones as Leander "Shreve" Scoville, Poppy's father, who had confronted her biological father Alexander Michael Troy when his wife Elinor had left him for the former when Poppy was four years old.
- Kate Hudson as Micah Keith (season 2), Poppy's childhood friend and famous writer
- David Lyons as Inspector Aames (season 2 - 3), the inspector assigned to investigate Micah's husband's death
- Katherine LaNasa as Noa Havilland (season 2; recurring season 1; guest season 3), the producer of Poppy's podcast
- Tami Roman as Lillian "Lily" Scoville (season 2 - 3; recurring season 1), Poppy's stepmother
- Gabrielle Union as Eva Pierre (season 3), a school principal
- Mychala Faith Lee as Trini Killebrew (season 3; recurring season 2), Markus' daughter
- Rico E. Anderson as Herbie, manages the biker bar, 'The Knock'.

=== Recurring ===
- Nic Bishop as Chuck Buhrman (season 1), Josie and Lanie's father
- Annabella Sciorra as Erin Buhrman (season 1), Josie and Lanie's mother
- Molly Hagan as Susan Carver (season 1), Josie and Lanie's aunt
- Billy Miller as Alex Dunn (season 1), Lanie's husband
- Everleigh McDonell as Ella Dunn (season 1), Lanie's daughter
- Brett Cullen as Owen Cave (season 1), Warren's father
- Lyndon Smith as Chandra Willets (season 1)
- Michael Franklin as Young Lukather "Shreve" Scoville (season 1)
- Christopher Backus as Holt Rollins (season 2), a mysterious man, linked to both Poppy and Micah Keith, who was the latter's lover.
- Alona Tal as Ivy Abbott (season 2), Micah Keith's right-hand woman
- Peter Gallagher as Andrew Finney (season 3), a man who is running for Mayor of Oakland
- Ricardo Chavira as Vince (season 3)

== Episodes ==
Season	Episodes	Originally released	
Season	Episodes	First released	Last released
1	8	December 6, 2019	January 10, 2020
2	10	August 20, 2021	October 22, 2021
3	10	January 20, 2023	March 24, 2023

=== Season 1 (2019–20) ===
No. overall	No. in season	Title	Directed by	Written by	Original release date
1	1	"Monster"	Mikkel Nørgaard	Teleplay by : Nichelle Tramble Spellman	December 6, 2019
Two decades after sixteen-year-old Warren Cave is incarcerated for the murder of Chuck Burnham, a retrial for Cave brings about new evidence involving the inconsistent testimony of Chuck's daughter Lanie. Poppy Parnell, a podcaster who rose to fame for her coverage on the trial, is a witness and the judge files against the appeal because of Lanie's fragile state following her father's murder. This however brings about a sense of worry and guilt for Poppy and prompts her to retell the events through her podcasts. Poppy soon decides on visiting Warren through his cancer-ridden mother and Lanie who refuses to participate. However, Warren's mother Melanie agrees on letting Poppy visit her son, but the meeting ends with Poppy leaving after Warren reveals numerous Nazi tattoos. Later, Poppy revisits Warren and believes he was changed by the system before revealing about his mother's cancer diagnosis and Cave reveals he used to infiltrate the Burnham's household for pills. A flashback shows Warren sneaking in for pills but after hearing a noise, left the house which could be what Lanie saw that night.
2	2	"Black People in the Neighborhood"	Rosemary Rodriguez	Nichelle Tramble Spellman	December 6, 2019
Warren calls Melanie and berates her for not telling him about her diagnosis before beating up an inmate who insults his mother. Poppy is confronted by Owen Cave, the chief of police and Warren's father who says his son deserves prison. She calls her ex, Markus to seek out Josie, the identical twin sister of Lanie who never appeared at the trials or testified. Markus soon follows Lanie and her aunt Susan, in the car, Lanie tries asking Susan where Josie is and when the phone rings revealing Josie as the caller, Susan tries to stop her niece, causing the car to crash and Susan to die of her injuries. Poppy hears of the accident and Susan's death from Markus who gives her Susan's phone he found. Josie Burnham is revealed to have adopted a new persona and engaged but listens to Poppy's voicemail through Susan's phone about her help in the case while Lanie searches through her aunt's belongings for clues on her twin sister's whereabouts. Owen meets with Warren and tells him to stop seeing Poppy. In New York, Poppy successfully finds Josie and talks with her about Warren's innocence and asks for her help. Markus discovers Melanie Cave had an affair with Chuck Burnham, thus opening a motive for Owen. Josie calls Lanie who asks for her sister to come home but she refuses while a fight in prison turns out to be a diversion and Warren is stabbed.
3	3	"Even Salt Looks like Sugar"	Sarah Pia Anderson	Chitra Elizabeth Sampath	December 6, 2019
Poppy hears of Warren's stabbing and is denied any access to see Warren anymore while Warren requests to be put back into the general population when he is released. Poppy asks her old biker friend, Jerbic, to send a message to Warren in prison. However, Wever receives a call from Warren who reveals that he knew about his mother's affair with Chuck and even told Owen months before the murder.
4	4	"No Cross, No Crown"	Mikkel Nørgaard	Davita Scarlett	December 13, 2019
Poppy and Markus trace their prime suspect's (Owen's) movements on the night of the murder, revealing a startling gap in events.
5	5	"Graveyard Love"	Tucker Gates	Matt Johnson	December 20, 2019
Poppy continues building her new case, while Warren faces repercussions for his actions.
6	6	"Not Buried, Planted"	Sarah Pia Anderson	Michael Kastelein	December 27, 2019
A devastated Poppy tries to walk away from the case, but it won't let her go.
7	7	"Live Thru This"	Loni Peristere	Darla Lansu & Alexandra Salerno	January 3, 2020
Poppy zeroes in on her new suspect, and Warren makes a fateful decision.
8	8	"All That Was Lost"	Mikkel Nørgaard	Leonard Dick	January 10, 2020
Poppy enlists an unlikely ally (Josie) in her hunt. Finally, the events of Halloween 1999 are revealed.

=== Season 2 (2021) ===
No. overall	No. in season	Title	Directed by	Written by	Original release date
9	1	"Other People’s Tears Are Only Water"	Mikkel Nørgaard	Nichelle Tramble Spellman	August 20, 2021
Poppy's old friend (Micah) from the streets invites her to a party celebrating her new book Discard, which Micah credits Poppy's initial editing of as a contribution to its publication, as well as the corresponding art exhibition. Something seems off about Micah's relationship with her husband (Josh) and Poppy is the one who later finds him dead in the arms of a younger man. During later questioning, Micah's assistant (Ramón), who claims that he didn't like Josh, states Micah has had issues with fans stalking her. Poppy stops by to ask Markus about being private security for Micah and he gets an office at Shelter, the women's lifestyle company that Micah founded, and learns that Micah gets a lot of hate mail. Micah asks Poppy for help and to use her podcast to get to the bottom of the murder. Poppy learns from Ingram that the police will classify the death as a murder-suicide, and she confronts detective Aames to threaten that he find the truth or that she will.
10	2	"Ghosts at the Feast"	Rosemary Rodriguez	Jamie Rosengard	August 27, 2021
Detective Aames questions an informant of the Son's of Ivar, the subject of Josh's recent documentary, but they are quickly eliminated as the suspect of Josh's murder. Shreve (Poppy's father) reveals a medical diagnosis to his family that will affect his memory, which proves difficult for his family to cope with. Noa uncovers that Josh had been in contact with the other murdered boy (Drew) for the past 6 months. As Poppy looks into Josh's death, she uncovers that Josh had multiple previous affairs and that he felt eclipsed by Micah's fame. At Drew's shiva, Poppy learns that Drew's parents were under the impression that he was Josh's intern. Ramón was also at the shiva and Poppy tracks him back the murder scene where he appeared to be trying to eliminate evidence of Josh's relationship with Drew, which turns out to actually be paternal. Micah becomes angry upon Poppy sharing this information with her, resulting in an outburst during her livestream Shelter event. An unknown character makes several suspicious appearances, including scaring Cydie (Poppy's sister) while she is at work. Poppy gets served with a wrongful death suit of Owen Cave (season 1 character).
11	3	"If Wishes Were Horses"	Dawn Wilkinson	Milla Bell-Hart	September 3, 2021
Ingram & Poppy continue to discuss their marital issues while he prepares her for her deposition. Poppy finds out that Shreves was having Josh record his thoughts and history before his memory gets too bad. Markus runs into an old friend whose daughter (Drea) is missing and he offers to look into it, beginning with asking his daughter (Trini) who says most students think she ran away. Poppy and Micah learns there's more than meets the eye with Ramón since he seems to have cared deeply for Josh, despite his earlier remarks to Poppy, including a connection to Drew. Micah grows distrustful of those closest to her resulting in her leaking information about Ramón to detective Aames that subsequently results in Ramón exposing secrets about Micah to social media.
12	4	"In Another Life"	Jet Wilkinson	J.L. Tiggett	September 10, 2021
The case takes a turn when another person close to Micah is found dead, Poppy and Ingram's marriage reaches a crossroads.
13	5	"If I Didn’t Laugh, You’d Cry"	Nelson Cragg	Amanda Segel	September 17, 2021
Coping with personal struggles, Poppy begins to question herself, Holt's old friend finds him, and Poppy and Aames identify a new murder suspect.
14	6	"All These Women"	Ariel Kleiman	Jeanine Daniels	September 24, 2021
Poppy and Markus search for a mysterious associate of Holt's; memories of Poppy's childhood with Miss Shirley invade her thoughts.
15	7	"Lanterman-Petris-Short"	Alexis Ostrander & Frederick E.O. Toye	Darla Lansu Campbell	October 1, 2021
Rose tells Poppy about Micah's past. Also, a protective Holt goes to extreme measures with violent consequences.
16	8	"The Untold Story"	Nelson Cragg	Hilly Hicks Jr.	October 8, 2021
Micah threatens to expose Poppy's dark secret. Also, Markus makes a major decision.
17	9	"Brick by Brick It Also Falls"	Kat Candler	Michael Kastelein	October 15, 2021
Poppy's pursuit of a suspect leads to a horrific confrontation. The truth about Poppy's childhood with Miss Shirley is revealed.
18	10	"Last Exit...Oakland"	Mikkel Nørgaard	Michael Kastelein & Matthew Montoya	October 22, 2021
Grappling with the aftermath of the attack, Poppy interviews Micah on her podcast and gets to the bottom of the case.

=== Season 3 (2023) ===
The titles are from a poem.

No. overall	No. in season	Title	Directed by	Written by	Original release date
19	1	"Unto the Sweet Bird's Throat"	Mikkel Nørgaard	Maisha Closson	January 20, 2023
Poppy focuses her next podcast on the neglected issue of missing black girls in Oakland as she tries once again to locate the runaway teen daughter of Markus' old friend. There is a series of black girls missing.
20	2	"Her, Armed with Sorrow Sore"	Mikkel Nørgaard	Jamie Rosengard & Henry "Hank" Jones	January 27, 2023
Poppy takes the investigation into her own hands and grapples with whether she can trust Eva, a Black female principal of the local high school. The show makes a startling turn when the vice principal, Eva, starts to use the dating app Questeur as "BOTTOM2TOPENERGY" to try to find out what is happening to these black girls. It turns out that Eva was "trafficked" by a Stanford Law student who promised to get her mother a green card. Poppy finds love letters to her late mother Elinor from an "Alexander" whom she learns is her birth father upon showing Shreve, who confirms that Elinor was indeed pregnant with her some time before meeting Shreve. He explains that four years after he and Elinor married, she had left him to return to Alexander Michael Troy, but had ultimately decided that Shreve was the better man to be a father to her and Alexander's illegitimate daughter: Poppy!
21	3	"Here She Shall See No Enemy"	Bille Woodruff	Rebecca Dameron & Darla Lansu Campbell	February 3, 2023
Markus tries getting to the bottom of a shocking discovery. Eva makes a startling confession to Poppy. It is revealed from the raid of a pimp house that Trini's boyfriend, is videotaping himself and Trini having sex. Trini is wearing a bra with the colors of the Jamaican flag.
22	4	"Never Take Your Eyes Off Her"	Bille Woodruff	Michael Kastelein & Lisa Michelle Payton	February 10, 2023
Trini ends up at a music recording studio with her boyfriend Aubrey. He threatens her for the first time after Trey attacks him. Trey is shot and killed in a back alley when Poppy shows up with the cops. In actuality, Aubrey is manipulating his girlfriend into wearing a satin lingerie, having sex and taking drugs with him again.
23	5	"Freedom Is Never Given; It Is Won"	Alrick Riley	Henry "Hank" Jones & Darla Lansu Campbell	February 17, 2023
24	6	"From My Hand the Poisoned Apple"	Alrick Riley	Lisa Michelle Payton	February 24, 2023
25	7	"The Luxury in Self-Reproach"	Frederick E.O. Toye	Jamie Rosengard & Madeleine Pron	March 3, 2023
26	8	"Darkness Steals the Glory of Light"	Frederick E.O. Toye	Rebecca Dameron & Janelle Malak	March 10, 2023
Poppy finds her relationship with Eva hanging in the balance as Markus and Poppy make a discovery that challenges their theory.
27	9	"Only Little Secrets"	Millicent Shelton	Michael Kastelein	March 17, 2023
28	10	"A Kiss Not Mine Alone"	Millicent Shelton	Maisha Closson & Matthew Montoya	March 24, 2023
Reeling in the aftermath of the attack, Poppy sets her sights on locating a suspect on the run. Meanwhile, Markus seeks help from Shreve. Later on, Poppy hears from Markus that Alexander Michael Troy may have been found. Poppy contemplates meeting her long-lost biological father.

== Production ==
=== Development ===
On January 3, 2018, Apple announced that it was developing a television series based on the novel Are You Sleeping by Kathleen Barber. The show was created by Nichelle Tramble Spellman who also wrote and executive produced the series as well. Other executive producers include Octavia Spencer via her Orit Entertainment, Reese Witherspoon and Lauren Neustadter for their company Hello Sunshine, and Peter Chernin, Jenno Topping and Kristen Campo for Chernin Entertainment. On May 2, 2018, Apple announced that they had given the production a series order for a first season consisting of ten episodes. On June 13, 2018, it was reported that Anna Foerster would direct the series' first episode. A featurette from the series was released on November 26, 2019. On March 5, 2020, Apple renewed the series for a second season, which premiered on August 20, 2021. On December 7, 2021, Apple renewed the series for a third season which premiered on January 20, 2023. On April 24, 2023, Apple canceled the series after three seasons.

=== Casting ===
Simultaneously with reports of the series' development, it was confirmed that Octavia Spencer has been cast in the series' lead role. In June 2018, it was announced that Lizzy Caplan, Aaron Paul, Elizabeth Perkins, Mekhi Phifer, Michael Beach, Tracie Thoms, Haneefah Wood, and Ron Cephas Jones had joined the main cast. Caplan, Paul, and Perkins all reportedly signed one-year deals for the series. In July 2018, it was reported that Tami Roman and Moon Bloodgood had joined the main cast and that Nic Bishop, Annabella Sciorra, Molly Hagan, Billy Miller, Brett Cullen, and Hunter Doohan would appear in recurring roles. In August 2018, it was announced that Lyndon Smith had joined the cast in a recurring capacity. Additionally, it was reported that Bloodgood had dropped out of the role of Cath Min after filming of the first four episodes had been completed. The role was expected to be recast and her already-filmed scenes to be reshot. On October 8, 2018, it was announced that Katherine LaNasa had been cast to replace Bloodgood, and her character Cath Min, in the newly devised recurring role of Noa Havilland.

In October 2020, it was announced that Kate Hudson would be starring in the second season of Truth Be Told. The next month, it was reported that Merle Dandridge, Jason O’Mara, Alona Tal, David Lyons, Christopher Backus, Cranston Johnson, Hale Appleman, Anthony Lee Medina and Mychala Lee has been cast for the second season of the series. On March 23, 2022, Gabrielle Union was reportedly cast as a lead role in the third season. On April 5, 2022, it was announced that Ana Ayora had joined the cast in the third season.

=== Filming ===
Principal photography for the series commenced on June 25, 2018 in Los Angeles, California. Filming reportedly concluded on December 12, 2018. Production for the second season began in Los Angeles on October 26, 2020, after being briefly delayed due to the COVID-19 pandemic. In February 2021, Leimert Park was planned to be a filming location for the second season but was delayed due to protesting against the filming. Filming moved to the Arts District in Los Angeles for the duration of April 2021 and wrapped by the end of the month. It was announced by Apple that third season has begun filming on April 15, 2022.

== Home media ==
Seasons 1 and 2 received Region 2 DVD and Blu-ray releases in December 2022 and February 2023, respectively. The complete series was released on Region 1 DVD and Blu-ray in February 2025.

== Reception ==
=== Critical response ===
On the review aggregator Rotten Tomatoes, the first season of the series has a score of 28%, based on 29 critics' reviews, with an average rating of 5.4/10. The site's critics consensus reads, "A twisty thriller that never quite comes together, Truth Be Told's commitment to the true crime at its center is less interesting or engaging than the family drama orbiting in the periphery." On Metacritic, it has a weighted average score of 46 out of 100, based on 14 critics, indicating "mixed or average reviews".

=== Awards and nominations ===
Year	Award	Category	Recipient(s)	Result	Ref.
2020	NAACP Image Awards	Outstanding Actress in a Television Movie, Mini-Series or Dramatic Special	Octavia Spencer	Nominated	
2020	NAACP Image Awards	NAACP Image Award for Outstanding Writing in a Dramatic Series	Nichelle Tramble Spellman	Won	
2022	NAACP Image Awards	Outstanding Actress in a Drama Series	Octavia Spencer	Nominated	
2024	NAACP Image Awards	Outstanding Actress in a Drama Series	Octavia Spencer	Nominated	
2023	Young Entertainer Awards	Best Recurring Young Actress | Television Series	Presley Parker Chasson	Nominated	
2024	Critics' Choice Television Awards	Best Supporting Actor in a Drama Series	Ron Cephas Jones	Nominated	
2024	Black Reel TV Awards	Outstanding Lead Performance in a Drama Series	Octavia Spencer	Nominated	

== See also ==
- List of Apple TV+ original programming
