= Follow Me (sculpture) =

US Army memorial in Fort Moore, Georgia

Coordinates: 32°23′21.2″N 84°57′19.1″W

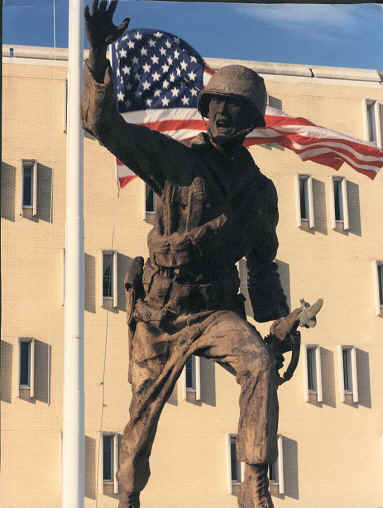
Follow Me in front of the Infantry School

Follow Me is a United States Army memorial located at Fort Benning, Georgia. It was created in 1959 by two soldiers, Private First Class Manfred Bass, sculptor and designer, and Private First Class Karl H. Van Krog, his assistant. The model for the statue was Eugene Wyles, an officer candidate and twenty-year Army veteran. It depicts a 1950s-era infantry soldier charging forward and gesturing for others to follow.

Originally called The Infantryman, the statue was installed on Eubanks Field on May 3, 1960. In 1964, it was renamed Follow Me and moved in front of Infantry Hall. Some students and graduates of the U.S. Army Infantry School call the statue Iron Mike, after Lieutenant General John W. "Iron Mike" O'Daniel, but most soldiers use the term Iron Mike to refer to the Airborne Trooper statue at the former Fort Bragg, North Carolina.

Reverse of the statue

In 2004, a new bronze version was cast and the original statue was moved to the front of the National Infantry Museum.

"Follow Me!" is also the US Army Infantry motto, attributed to Maj. Gen. Aubrey Newman.
