= Are You Sleeping (novel) =

2017 mystery novel by Kathleen Barber

- First edition
- Author: Kathleen Barber
- Genre: Mystery
- Publisher: Gallery Books
- Publication date: Aug 1, 2017
- Pages: 326
- ISBN: 9781501157660

Are You Sleeping, the debut novel of Kathleen Barber, is a murder mystery. Barber draws on her knowledge of the law, practicing in Chicago and New York. Barber acknowledges that she was influenced by the Serial podcast, and a key element of the novel is a podcast that looks into the case of a prisoner who may have been wrongfully convicted of murder. The hardcover edition was published in 2017 and the paperback in 2018.

Television rights were acquired, and Nichelle Tramble Spellman produced a television series entitled Truth Be Told for the Apple TV+ streaming service starting in 2019. The novel was then renamed Truth Be Told in 2019 to reflect the name of the television series.

== Plot ==
Estranged twins Josie and Lanie Buhrman lost both their parents when they were fifteen years old. Their father Charles "Chuck" was murdered, and their mother Erin ran away to join a cult. Thirteen years later the sisters each learn that an independent investigative journalist, Poppy Parnell, is regularly releasing podcasts, in which she investigates whether Warren Cave, the man convicted of killing their father, was wrongfully convicted, as his conviction relied heavily on Lanie's eyewitness testimony. As Parnell's investigation gathers steam, the twins are forced to meet after their mother commits suicide.

=== Differences with TV series ===
Bustle magazine published a guide to the novel for fans of the TV series, detailing major adjustments the screenwriters made in their adaptation to a visual media. For instance the novel's protagonist is Josie Burhman, one of the twins, and Poppy Parnell, the podcaster, is merely a minor character. As Parnell's podcasts dig up new evidence, Josie's doubts about Cave's convictions grow. In the show, Poppy is the central protagonist.
