= Follow Me TV (Canada) =

Follow Me Television
- Country: Canada
- Broadcast area: Global
- Network: Follow Me TV
- Headquarters: London, Ontario

Links
- Website: http://followmetv.net/

Follow Me Television is a multicultural community television channel, focusing on cultural events as well as other community programs.

Follow Me Television is a channel that emphasizes promoting love and peace through its programming. It features a variety of multicultural programs, with a particular focus on youth-oriented content.

This initiative involves professionals from various regions, including Australasia, Canada, the United States, the United Kingdom, Nigeria, the Middle East, Europe, and India, supported by the North American Laity Professionals' Forum. Follow Me TV aims to disseminate positive news and contribute to the growth of the migrant community in North America, with a particular focus on individuals from Kerala.

Utilizing modern technology, Follow Me TV broadcasts messages of love and peace globally. The channel offers relevant, useful, and engaging programs designed to educate, inform, and support viewers in prayer and reflection.
