= Damon Herriman =

Australian actor

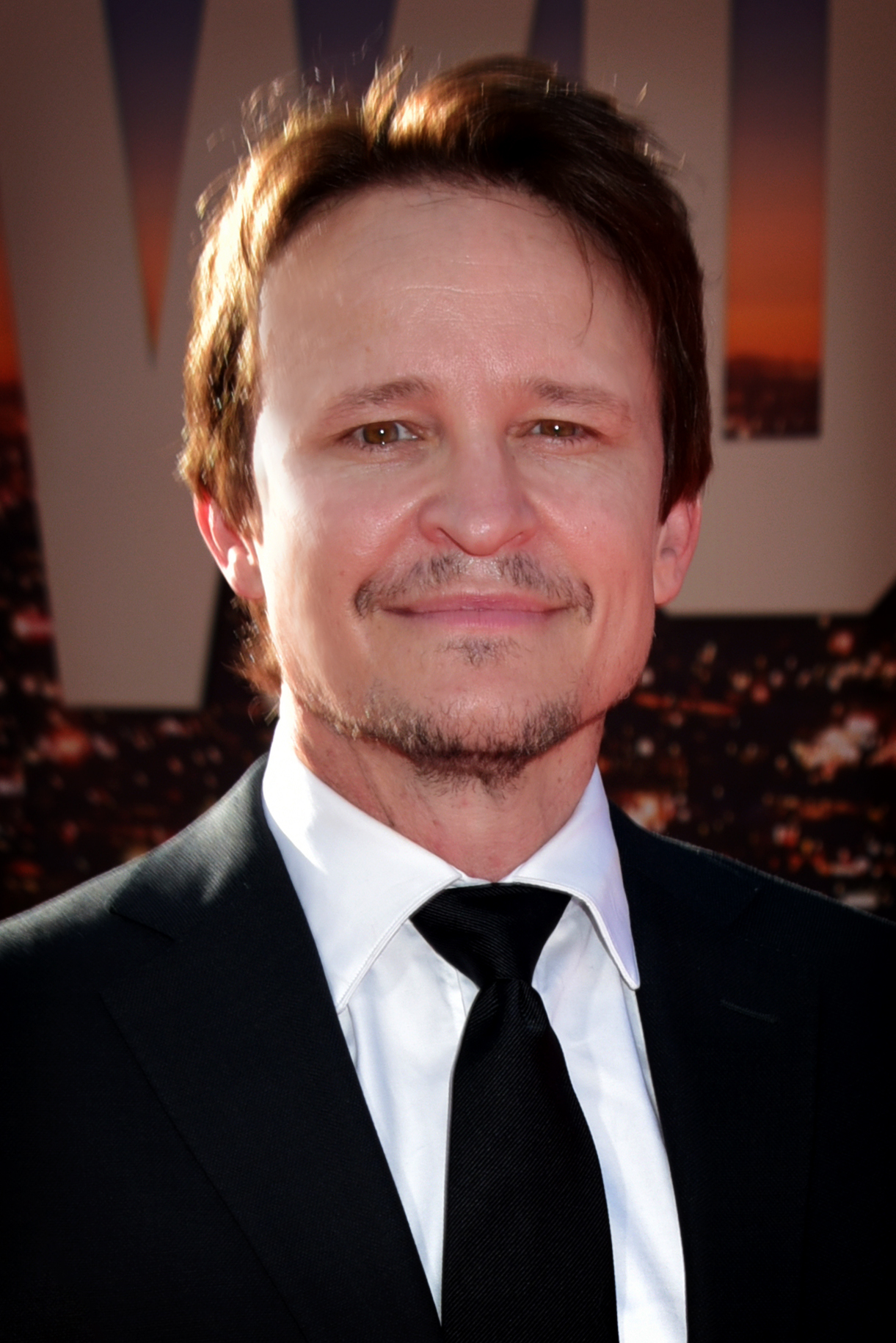
- Herriman in 2019
- Born: 31 March 1970 (age 56); Adelaide, South Australia
- Occupation: Actor
- Years active: 1978–present

Damon Herriman (born 31 March 1970) is an Australian actor. He is best known for his roles as Dewey Crowe on the FX neo-western crime series Justified (2010–15), Romeo on the Starz drama miniseries Flesh and Bone (2015), and Freddy on the FX crime comedy-drama Mr Inbetween (2018-21). He is also known for having played cult leader Charles Manson twice; on the second season of the Netflix psychological crime thriller series Mindhunter, and in the comedy drama film Once Upon a Time in Hollywood (both 2019).

Herriman won the AACTA Award for Best Actor in a Leading Role for his role as Punch in the black comedy film Judy and Punch (2019), and was nominated for the AACTA Award for Best Actor in a Supporting Role for his role as Ruse in the historical psychological thriller film The Nightingale (2018).

== Early life and education ==
Herriman was born in Adelaide, South Australia to parents Noel and Margaret. When he was three, the family relocated to Alice Springs in the Northern Territory for five years, when his father, an insurance manager, was transferred for work. While there, his father dabbled in amateur theatre and radio commercials. When a father and son opportunity for a radio advertisement arose, the pair landed the job.

Herriman's parents split when he was five, and the family soon moved back to Adelaide, where Herriman lived with his father and brother Steven in the suburb of Vale Park, attending Marden High School.

Herriman's father, recognising his son's acting potential, wrote to director Peter Weir (the 'most famous person he could think of') and Weir wrote back, suggesting he sign with an agent. Soon thereafter, Herriman began appearing in TV commercials. On a trip to Melbourne, the pair visited several production houses to try to secure an audition for Herriman.

== Career ==
After auditioning for Crawford Productions, Herriman was cast as Frank Errol in drama series The Sullivans at the age of ten. The role lasted over a period of two years and saw him nominated for three Logie Awards, including Most Popular New Talent and Best Performance by a Juvenile.

All before the age of 12, Herriman went on to secure regular work in television, including children's miniseries The Patchwork Hero (1981) alongside Steve Bisley, period drama miniseries Sara Dane (1982) and For The Term of His Natural Life (1983), an adaptation of Marcus Clarke's 1894 novel, featuring Colin Friels. He also had a role in Grundy's soap opera Taurus Rising.

In his teen years, Herriman lost his confidence, and began working full-time as an insurance clerk alongside his father, relocating to Sydney. During this time however, he continued to undertake television, stage and radio voiceover work, and at 18, scored a guest role in The Flying Doctors, for which he won the Penguin Award for Excellence in a Performance by a Juvenile. He also played neighbour Liam in children's miniseries Elly & Jools, before being cast as Mark Jorgensen, the bespectacled best friend of Ben Mendelsohn's Danny Clark in his first feature, the Australian cult comedy classic The Big Steal (1990).

When his appearance in The Big Steal didn't lead to further film work, Herriman began scripts and plays, including Soar. He took his play to newly-formed theatre group, Tamarama Rock Surfers, gaining the attention of other creative up-and-comers including Joel and Nash Edgerton. Intent on acting and writing full time, he quit his insurance job at the age of 27 and made two short films, the Tropfest finalists They and The Date.

In 1999, Herriman won the United States green card lottery and relocated to Los Angeles in 2000, to further his career. Having no luck, he returned to Sydney 10 weeks later. In 2003, he eventually landed a role in critically acclaimed Foxtel series Love My Way, as George Wagstaffe, workmate and friend of Frankie Page (played by Claudia Karvan). His play Soar was also developed as a short film and in 2004, won him the Best Screenplay award at Flickerfest.

A role in Nash Edgerton's Blue-Tongue Films short film Fuel (2003) was Herriman's first foray into playing creepy, inbred characters and led to his casting as Lester, the roadkill truck driver in 2005 American horror film House of Wax, alongside Paris Hilton. After returning to the States for the film's premiere, Herriman signed with an agent and began looking for work there once more. After a couple of years, he finally scored a guest role in David Mamet's action-drama series The Unit in 2006 and worked with Heath Ledger on Australian film Candy the same year.

Over the next couple of years, Herriman had guest roles in American and Australian series alike, including The Loop, Cold Case, Chandon Pictures, CSI: Crime Scene Investigation, Satisfaction, Offspring and Rake. In 2008, he also had roles in several films – David Mamet's martial arts feature Redbelt, psychological drama Winged Creatures, and Australian thriller The Square.

Herriman then landed his breakthrough role as redneck Dewey Crowe in crime drama series Justified in 2010, going on to work on the show for six years. He also had a guest role as a drug addict in Breaking Bad and played the convicted kidnapper of the Lindbergh baby, Bruno Hauptmann, in the Clint Eastwood-directed J. Edgar in 2011.

In 2012, Herriman co-starred as Reg in Australian comedy-horror film 100 Bloody Acres alongside Angus Sampson and had a recurring role in Australian comedy series Laid, playing Marcus Dwyer, before taking on another recurring role as hitman Mr. Jones on the CBS crime series Vegas. He also appeared as Ray, a member of the Cavendish gang in Gore Verbinski's 2013 film The Lone Ranger, opposite Johnny Depp.

In demand back in Australia, Herriman played the main role of titular bushranger in 2013 ABC telemovie, The Outlaw Michael Howe. That same year, he was also a performer and contributing writer on the ABC sketch comedy series The Elegant Gentleman's Guide to Knife Fighting. In 2014, he had a main role in Josh Lawson's debut feature The Little Death. He also played music executive Chris Murphy in biographical miniseries INXS: Never Tear Us Apart and Father McIntyre in drama film The Water Diviner, alongside Russell Crowe.

In 2015, Herriman appeared in the CBS series Battle Creek, played the homeless Romeo in Starz miniseries Flesh and Bone and also the violent hitman Buddy in the first season of the HBO/Cinemax series, Quarry. In 2016, he appeared in Australian feature film Down Under and played transgender character Kim Gordon in the series Secret City, opposite Anna Torv, earning a Logie Award for his performance in the latter.

In 2018, Herriman played the lead role of unionist Lance Gowland in ABC TV movie, civil rights drama Riot, winning an AACTA Award for Best Lead Actor in a Television Drama for his portrayal. From 2018 to 2021, he had a main role in Australian black comedy miniseries Mr Inbetween, playing Freddy the sleazy owner of a strip club. He also played a role in 2018 Australian film, The Nightingale.

2019 saw Herriman play Charles Manson twice, beginning with an episode of crime series Mindhunter, followed by Quentin Tarantino's feature film Once Upon a Time in Hollywood, with Brad Pitt, Leonardo DiCaprio and Margot Robbie. Nicholas Hammond (Freidrich from The Sound of Music) who was also appearing in the film, had previously played Herriman's father in a stage production of Lost in Yonkers in 1992. When he learned that Herriman was playing Manson in Mindhunter, he put forth his name for the role of the cult leader in the film. After seeing Herrimann's name written down, Timothy Olyphant, who'd played opposite him in Justified also recommended him to Tarantino, leading to an audition that secured Herriman the role.

Herriman had several other roles in 2019, including playing Paul Allen Brown in Steven Conrad's neo-noir thriller series Perpetual Grace, LTD, opposite Ben Kingsley. He appeared as a menacing priest in Australian drama series Lambs of God and had a role in climate change drama series The Commons. He also co-starred in the film Judy and Punch with Mia Wasikowska, taking out Best Actor at both the AACTA Awards and the Film Critics Circle of Australia Awards.

In 2021, Herriman voiced the role of Kabal in Mortal Kombat, with stuntman Daniel Nelson portraying the character in the suit. He also featured in Netflix crime miniseries The Serpent as a boozy Australian diplomat, voiced the claymation character 'Street Hustler Boy' in stop-motion series Ultra City Smiths and played against type, as a 'nice guy' in historical miniseries The Underground Railroad, based on the book of the same name.

Herriman next appeared in 2022 series The Tourist, playing Detective Inspector Lachlan Rogers opposite Jamie Dornan, and Thai Cave Rescue, based on the events of the 2018 Tham Luang cave rescue, playing Dr. Craig Challen. The following year, he played Captain Gaines in Disney+ series The Artful Dodger, a series designed as a sequel to Oliver Twist, following the titular character as he adjusts to his new life as a surgeon in Australia. He also had a supporting role in Australian psychological horror Run Rabbit Run, opposite Sarah Snook and played Brucie in American crime drama film The Bikeriders with Austin Butler and Tom Hardy.

In 2024, Herriman played British band manager Nigel Martin-Smith in Robbie Williams biopic Better Man and Roger in Australian drama film How to Make Gravy, inspired by the song by Paul Kelly. The following year he had a supporting role in the body-horror film Together, with Dave Franco and Alison Brie. He then starred in Australian director Dario Russo's 2025 debut feature The Fox, together with Jai Courtney, Emily Browning, and featuring the voices of Sam Neill and Olivia Colman. That same year he joined the main cast of American horror-comedy series The Bondsman, alongside Kevin Bacon, playing the role of crime mogul Lucky Callahan.

In 2026, Herriman, together with Richard Roxburgh and Toby Schmitz embarked on a national Australian tour of Yasmina Reza's comic play Art, playing the role of Serge.

Herriman is due to appear in upcoming American action thriller film Subversion, alongside Chris Hemsworth, Lily James, Michael Peña, David Wenham and Teresa Palmer.

Herriman has also made acting appearances in music videos for Bernard Fanning's “Wasting Time” (2016) and Julia Stone's "Unreal" (2020).

== Personal life ==
Herriman had a girlfriend when he embarked on his first trip to the US in 2000, to further his career. Although the US stint only lasted 10 weeks before his return to Sydney, the pair broke up.

In 2020, Herriman shared that constantly travelling for work makes long-term relationships difficult, saying: "I started spending half the year in two different countries right around the time I was expecting I would settle down, so, 15 years of that lifestyle hasn't helped." In 2024, he told The Australian: "I had a girlfriend recently for a couple of years and that probably did suffer partly because of the distance."

== Filmography ==
=== Film ===
Year	Title	Role	Notes	Ref.
1979	Pesticides: Friend or Foe	Performer	Short film (documentary)	
1986	Push Start		TV film	
1989	Police State	Parker's Son	TV film	
1990	Call Me Mr. Brown	Bowser Boy	TV film	
1990	The Big Steal	Mark Jorgensen		
1998	They	Five	Short film	
1998	Meteorites!	Nick	TV film	
1998	Praise	Skinhead		
2001	South Pacific	Professor	TV film	
2001	The Hitch	Hitchhiker	Short film	
2003	Ned	Steve Hart / Orderly		
2003	Fuel	The Attendant	Short film	
2004	Soar	Jack	Short film	
2004	Chipman	Chipman	Short film	
2004	Post	1st AD	Short film	
2004	Sold Out	Voice/Commentary	Short film	
2005	A Family Legacy	Australian Commentary	Short film	
2005	Son of the Mask	Animagine Employee		
2005	House of Wax	Lester Sinclair		
2006	Candy	Roger Moylan		
2006	Fainting Your Way to the Top	The Presenter	Short film	
2006	Can I Call You	Julian	Short film	
2007	Lens Love Story	Len	Short film	
2008	Bella		Short film	
2008	Redbelt	Official at Arena		
2008	The Square	Eddie		
2008	Winged Creatures	TV Minister	Released as Fragments on DVD	
2009	The News	Daniel	Short film	
2009	Lost & Found	Anthony Eckel	TV film	
2010	Shock	Radio Announcer	Short film	
2010	Call Centre	Hugo	Short film	
2011	Commercialisms	Director	Short film	
2011	Monkeys	Bartender	Short film	
2011	Pet	Daniel	Short film	
2011	J. Edgar	Bruno Hauptmann		
2011	The Last Time I Saw Michael Gregg	Curtis Preest		
2012	100 Bloody Acres	Reg Morgan		
2012	Rabbit	Dentist	Short film	
2013	The Lone Ranger	Ray		
2013	Wishart	Andy Wishart	Short film	
2013	Record	Jamie	Short film	
2013	The Broken Shore	Jamie Bourgoyne	TV film	
2013	The Outlaw Michael Howe	Michael Howe	TV film	
2014	Smithston	Mr Jones	Short film	
2014	The Water Diviner	Father McIntyre		
2014	Son of a Gun	Wilson		
2014	The Little Death	Dan		
2016	Down Under	Jason		
2016	The Eleven O’Clock	Nathan Klein	Short film	
2018	The Nightingale	Ruse		
2018	Riot	Lance Gowland	TV film	
2019	Once Upon a Time in Hollywood	Charles Manson		
2019	Judy and Punch	Punch		
2021	Peter Rabbit 2: The Runaway	Tom Kitten (voice)		
2021	Mortal Kombat	Kabal (voice)		
2022	Nude Tuesday	Bruno/husband		
2022	Monolith	Voice		
2023	Run Rabbit Run	Peter		
2023	The Portable Door	Monty Smith-Gregg		
2023	The Bikeriders	Brucie		
2024	Better Man	Nigel Martin-Smith		
2024	How to Make Gravy	Roger		
2025	Together	Jamie		
2025	The Fox	Derek	Directed by Dario Russo; premiered on 19 October 2025 at the Adelaide Film Festival	
2026	Mortal Kombat II	Quan Chi		
TBA	Subversion †		Post-production	

=== Television ===
Year	Title	Role	Notes	Ref.
1976	The Sullivans	Frank Errol		
1981	The Patchwork Hero	Hardy Jamieson	6 episodes	
1982	Taurus Rising	Phil Drysdale		
1982	Sara Dane	David	Miniseries - 3 episodes	
1983	For the Term of His Natural Life	Blinker	Miniseries - 1 episode	
1984	Carson's Law	Jimmy	2 episodes	
1987	Camera Script		episode "Second Star On The Right"	
1988	The Flying Doctors	Tod White	2 episodes	
1989	E Street	Dean ‘Dino’ Connors	2 episodes	
1990	Elly & Jools	Liam O'Farrell	Miniseries - 12 episodes	
1991	The Miraculous Mellops	Felix	3 episodes	
1991	Brides of Christ	Grant	Miniseries - 1 episode	
1998	Murder Call	Lindsay Cramer	Season 2, episodes 10-11: “Deadline“ (parts 1 & 2)	
1998–1999	All Saints	Danny Bucknell	2 episodes	
2001	Flat Chat	Unknown	Episode: "The Old Flame"	
2001	Water Rats	Todd Grierson / Gerry Bourke	4 episodes	
2004	Stingers	Dale Kemp	Episode: "The Weakest Link"	
2004	The Cooks	Nigel	Episode: "Beef with You"	
2006	Love My Way	George Wagstaffe	18 episodes	
2006	The Unit	Sgt. Parker	Episode: "Old Home Week"	
2006	Stupid, Stupid Man	Pippy	Episode: "The Cobra"	
2007	The Loop	Harald Juvlunktinston	Episode: "The Windows"	
2008	Cold Case	John Smith	Episode: "The Road"	
2009	Chandon Pictures	Scotty Cornish	Episode: "Rockstar"	
2010	CSI: Crime Scene Investigation	Dwayne Simmons	Episode: "Wild Life"	
2010	Satisfaction	Dominic	Episode: "Bug Crush"	
2010	Offspring	Boyd Carlisle	3 episodes	
2010	Rake	Detective Maraco	2 episodes	
2010–2015	Justified	Dewey Crowe	22 episodes	
2011	Breaking Bad	Scary Skell	Episode: "Cornered"	
2011	Wilfred	Jesse	Episode: "Fear"	
2012	Laid	Marcus Dwyer	6 episodes	
2012	The Strange Calls	Adrian	Miniseries - Episode: "Roots"	
2012–2013	Vegas	Mr. Jones	4 episodes	
2013	The Elegant Gentleman's Guide to Knife Fighting	Various characters	Miniseries - 6 episodes	
2013	Almost Human	Lucas Vincent impersonator	Episode: "Are You Receiving?"	
2014	INXS: Never Tear Us Apart	Chris Murphy	2 episodes	
2015	Battle Creek	Detective Niblet	9 episodes	
2015	Flesh and Bone	Romeo	Miniseries - 8 episodes	
2015	Scorpion	Gleason	Episode: "US vs. UN vs. UK"	
2016	No Activity	Bernie	5 episodes	
2016	Quarry	Buddy	8 episodes	
2016	Secret City	Kim Gordon	6 episodes	
2016–2017	Incorporated	Jonathan Hendrick	9 episodes	
2017	Top of the Lake: China Girl	Toni Bolloti	Episode: "Surrogate"	
2018	Squinters	Miles	4 episodes	
2018–2021	Mr Inbetween	Freddy	Main cast	
2019	Perpetual Grace, LTD	Paul Allen Brown	Main cast	
2019	Lambs of God	Father Bob	Miniseries - 2 episodes	
2019	Mindhunter	Charles Manson	Episode #2.5	
2019	The Commons	Ben Childers	3 episodes	
2021	The Serpent	Laver	Miniseries - 3 episodes	
2021	The Underground Railroad	Martin	Miniseries - 2 episodes	
2021	Ultra City Smiths	Various Characters	6 episodes	
2022	The Tourist	Detective Inspector Lachlan Rogers	Miniseries - 5 episodes	
2022	Thai Cave Rescue	Doctor Craig Challen	Netflix limited series	
2023	The Artful Dodger	Captain Gaines	8 episodes	
2025	The Bondsman	Lucky Callahan	Main Cast	
2026	Neagley	Lawrence Cole	Main Cast	

=== Music video appearances ===
Year	Title	Artist	Role	Ref.
2015	"Raining Gold"	ARO (Aimee Osbourne)		
2016	“Wasting Time”	Bernard Fanning	Wayne, Gary & Terry	
2020	“Unreal”	Julia Stone	Self	

== Stage ==
Year	Title	Role	Notes	Ref.
1979	Auntie Mame		Theatre Royal, Adelaide with Therry Dramatic Society	
1988	Brighton Beach Memoirs		Arts Theatre, Adelaide with Adelaide Repertory Theatre	
1990	Operation Holy Mountain	Tony	Q Theatre, Penrith	
1992	Lost in Yonkers	Jay Kurnitz	Australian tour with STC & MTC	
1992	St. James Infirmary Blues	Tim	Q Theatre, Penrith	
1993	St. James Infirmary	Dominic Connolly	Russell St Theatre, Melbourne with MTC	
1993	Summer of the Aliens	Lewis	Wharf Theatre, Sydney with STC	
1994	Two Weeks with the Queen	Colin	Playhouse, Perth, Cremorne Theatre, Brisbane, Glen St Theatre, Sydney	
1995	Sanctuary	John	Bridge Theatre Coniston, Lakeview St Theatre & Playhouse, Perth with New England Theatre Co & Theatre South	
	A Fair Country	Gil Burgess		
	Soar	Jack (also writer)	Tamarama Rock Surfers, Sydney	
1996	The Cripple of Inishmaan	Bartley McCormick	STC	
	Five Sevens (workshop)		STC	
	The Fortunes of Richard Mahony (workshop)		STC	
	Cloudstreet	Ted Pickles, Gerry Clay, Toby Raven	Belvoir St Theatre, Sydney with Company B	
1998	2 Strikes		Red Shed Theatre, Adelaide with Tamarama Rock Surfers for Adelaide Fringe	
1999	Laughter on the 23rd Floor	Ira Stone	Sydney Opera House with Ensemble Theatre	
2002	ATM	Nick, Ricky, Cyrus, Phillipe, Little Boy	Bowlers' Club of NSW with Roguestar Productions for Sydney Festival	
2002	Presence	Sam	Stables Theatre, Sydney with Griffin Theatre Company	
2002	Buried Child	Vince	Belvoir St Theatre, Sydney with Company B	
2004	Light on the Hill		Belvoir St Theatre, Sydney with Company B	
2004	Petunia Takes Tea	Mother	Newtown Theatre, Sydney for Short+Sweet	
2004	The Underpants	Cohen	QPAC, Brisbane with QTC & Company B	
	Terrorism – New Russian Plays	Man	STC	
	Half a Life (workshop)		Belvoir St Theatre, Sydney	
2005	The Spook	Martin	Glen St Theatre, Sydney & QPAC, Brisbane with Company B	
2005	Broken Valley		Belvoir St Theatre, Sydney for Company B	
2008	The Pillowman	Katurian	Belvoir St Theatre, Sydney for Company B	
2009	10,000 Beers (workshop)	Len / various	Playwriting Australia	
2009–2010	Tot Mom	Charaktere / various	Wharf Theatre, Sydney with STC	
2013	The Wild Duck	Gregers Werle	Holland Festival & Vienna Festival with Belvoir	
2015	The Blind Date Project	Tom (guest performer)	Performing Lines with Ride On Theatre for Sydney Festival	
2016	Speed-the-Plow	Bobby Gould	Roslyn Packer Theatre, Sydney with STC	
2026	Art	Serge	Australian tour with STC	

== Awards ==
Year	Award	Award category	Nominated work	Result	Ref.
1981	Logie Awards	Most Popular New Talent	The Sullivans	Nominated	
1981	Logie Awards	Best Performance by a Juvenile	The Sullivans	Nominated	
1982	Logie Awards	Best Performance by a Juvenile	The Sullivans	Nominated	
1989	Penguin Awards	Excellence in a Performance by a Juvenile	The Flying Doctors	Won	
1998	Tropfest	Best Short Film	They	Finalist	
1999	Tropfest	Best Short Film	The Date	Finalist	
2004	Flickerfest	Best Screenplay	Soar	Won	
2004	Flickerfest	Audience Award	Soar	Won	
2008	St Kilda Short Film Festival	Best Actor	Len's Love Story	Won	
2008	Sydney Theatre Awards	Best Actor in a Lead Role	The Pillowman	Nominated	
2012	Monte-Carlo Television Festival	Outstanding Actor in a Comedy Series	Laid	Nominated	
2012	AACTA Awards	Best Comedy Performance	Laid	Nominated	
2012	Equity Ensemble Awards	Outstanding Performance by an Ensemble in a Comedy Series	Laid	Nominated	
2013	Equity Ensemble Awards	Outstanding Performance by an Ensemble in a Comedy Series	Laid	Nominated	
2014	Equity Ensemble Awards	Outstanding Performance by an Ensemble in a Television Movie or Miniseries	The Outlaw Michael Howe	Nominated	
2014	Auscritic Awards	Best Actor	100 Bloody Acres	Nominated	
2014	Accolade Global Film Competition	Award of Excellence – Supporting Actor	INXS: Never Tear Us Apart	Won	
2014	AACTA Awards	Best Lead Actor	The Little Death	Nominated	
2016	Film Critics Circle of Australia Awards	Best Actor in a Supporting Role	Down Under	Nominated	
2016	AACTA Awards	Best Supporting Actor	Down Under	Nominated	
2016	AACTA Awards	Best Guest or Supporting Actor in a Drama	Secret City	Won	
2017	Logie Awards	Most Outstanding Supporting Actor	Secret City	Won	
2017	Equity Ensemble Awards	Outstanding Performance by an Ensemble in a Comedy Series	No Activity (season 2)	Nominated	
2017	Equity Ensemble Awards	Outstanding Performance by an Ensemble in a Television Movie or Miniseries	Secret City	Nominated	
2018	Equity Ensemble Awards	Outstanding Performance by an Ensemble in a Television Movie or Miniseries	Riot	Won	
2018	Logie Awards	Most Outstanding Actor	Riot	Nominated	
2018	AACTA Awards	Best Lead Actor in a Television Drama	Riot	Won	
2018	Orry-Kelly Award	Body of work contributing to Australia's national identity	Damon Herriman	Honoured	
2019	AACTA Awards	Best Actor	Judy and Punch	Won	
2019	AACTA Awards	Best Supporting Actor	The Nightingale	Nominated	
2019	AACTA Awards	Best Guest or Supporting Actor in a Television Drama	Lambs of God	Nominated	
2019	AACTA Awards	Best Guest or Supporting Actor in a Television Drama	Mr Inbetween	Nominated	
2019	Film Critics Circle of Australia Awards	Best Actor	Judy and Punch	Won	
2019	Film Critics Circle of Australia Awards	Best Actor in a Supporting Role	The Nightingale	Nominated	
2020	Critics' Choice Awards	Best Acting Ensemble	Once Upon a Time in Hollywood	Nominated	
2020	AACTA Awards	Best Guest or Supporting Actor in a Television Drama	The Commons	Nominated	
2020	Online Film & Television Association Awards	Best Guest Actor in a Drama Series	Mindhunter	Nominated	
2020	International Online Cinema Awards	Best Guest Actor in a Drama Series	Mindhunter	Nominated	
2020	Auscritic Awards	Best Actor	Judy and Punch	Nominated	
2020	Auscritic Awards	Best Supporting Actor	The Nightingale	Nominated	
2022	Logie Awards	Most Outstanding Supporting Actor	The Tourist	Nominated	
2022	AACTA Awards	Best Guest or Supporting Actor in a Television Drama	The Tourist	Nominated	
2022	AACTA Awards	Best Actor in a Leading Role	Nude Tuesday	Nominated	
2025	AACTA Awards	Best Supporting Actor in Film	Better Man	Won	
2025	AACTA Awards	Best Supporting Actor in Film	How to Make Gravy	Nominated	
2025	Equity Ensemble Awards	Outstanding Performance by an Ensemble in a Television Movie or a Miniseries	How to Make Gravy	Won	
