= Ultra City Smiths =

Ultra City Smiths is a 2021 stop motion television series written by Steven Conrad and co-directed by him and David H. Brooks. It was first screened on AMC+ and received positive reviews.

== Premise ==
Ultra City is a dark fictionalised version of New York City. There is an mayoral election in the city contested by two men, one of whom disappears in the first episode and is later found murdered. He was a Smith and all the people he spoke to in the hours before his death were Smiths. Two police detectives, David Mills and Gail Johnson are put in a new partnership in order to investigate the case. When Johnson is herself linked to the case as a Smith she steps aside and a new detective, Nico Onasis joins Mills. The two officers interview the various Smiths and follow the leads, before Onasis is murdered.

There are various subplots which include a member of congress who cannot stop sending dick pics, a woman who is mugged of a drug delivery, her mother who wants to recover the money by fighting on the underground wrestling circuit, a teenage gang who wear masks of former president Richard Nixon and a homeless hustler trying to raise money towards an operation to save his dying boyfriend.

== Cast ==
There is an ensemble cast, in alphabetical order:

- Julian Barratt – voice of The Most Dangerous Man in the World
- Kristen Bell – voice of Donella Pecker
- Chris Conrad – voice of Detective Nico Onasis
- Luis Guzmán – voice of Rodrigo Smalls
- Damon Herriman – voice of Street Hustler Boy
- Jason Mantzoukas – voice of Tim Snodgrass
- Bebe Neuwirth – voice of Lady Andrea the Giant
- Da'Vine Joy Randolph – voice of Detective Gail Johnson
- John C. Reilly – voice of Donovan Smith
- Alia Shawkat – voice of Little Grace
- Jimmi Simpson – voice of Detective David Mills
- Tom Waits – voice of The Narrator
- Debra Winger – Trish McSapphire

== Episodes ==
No. overall	No. in season	Title	Directed by	Written by	Original release date	U.S. viewers (millions)
1	1	"Ultra City, She Don't Care"	David H. Brooks; Steven Conrad	Steven Conrad	July 22, 2021	N/A
2	2	"The King of the Night"	David H. Brooks; Steven Conrad	Steven Conrad	July 22, 2021	N/A
3	3	"Hot Clues"	David H. Brooks; Steven Conrad	Steven Conrad	July 29, 2021	N/A
4	4	"The Little Baby Hand Pinky Grip"	David H. Brooks; Steven Conrad	Steven Conrad	August 5, 2021	N/A
5	5	"O-o-h Child"	David H. Brooks; Steven Conrad	Steven Conrad	August 12, 2021	N/A
6	6	"Family of Orphans"	David H. Brooks; Steven Conrad	Steven Conrad	August 19, 2021	N/A

== Production ==
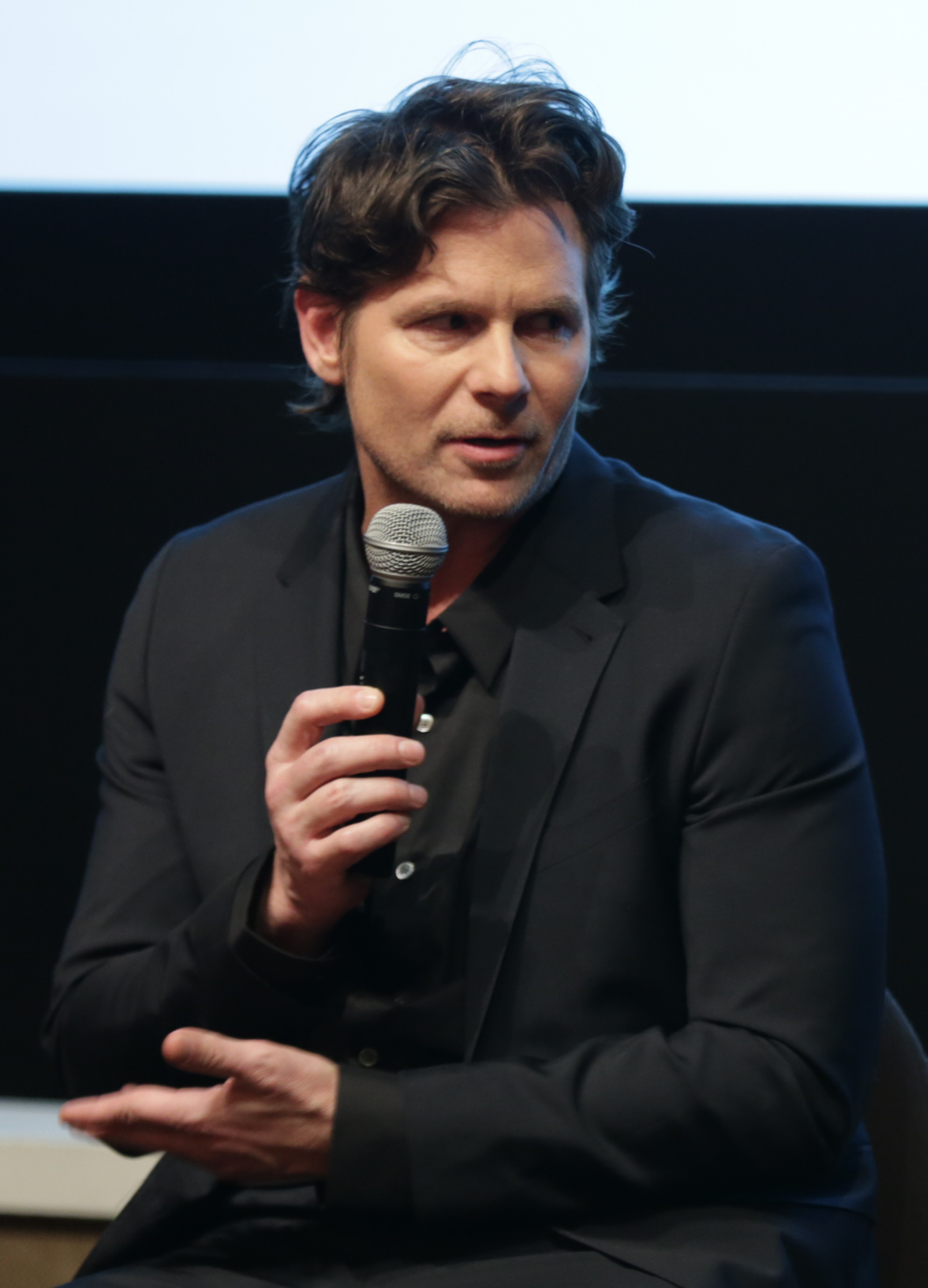
Steven Conrad in 2017

Conrad had previously explored stop motion animation of baby dolls in a pilot for a show called Timms Valley which IFC declined to commission in 2014. For Ultra City Smiths he worked with Stoopid Buddy Stoodios, who are also known for their animation of Robot Chicken. Jeff Dieter and Tom Glenn used baby dolls dressed in adult outfits to create the list of characters. The series was streamed on AMC+ in 2021.

== Reception ==
The series received critical acclaim: Indiewire praised how it "tackles its many creative departures with captivating verve" and the New York Times called it a "show not quite like any other".
