= Escape Artists =

American production company

Escape Artists Productions, LLC
- Type: Production company
- Industry: Film; Television
- Predecessors: The Steve Tisch Company; Black & Blu
- Founded: 2000; 26 years ago
- Founders: Steve Tisch; Todd Black; Jason Blumenthal
- Headquarters: Culver City, California, United States
- Key people: Todd Black; Steve Tisch; David Bloomfield; Jason Blumenthal
- Website: escapeartists.com

Escape Artists Productions, LLC, commonly known as Escape Artists, is an American independently financed motion picture and television production company that has a first look non-exclusive deal at Sony Pictures Entertainment, headed by partners Steve Tisch, Todd Black, Jason Blumenthal and David Bloomfield.

The company's production office is located in the Astaire Building on the Sony Pictures Studios lot in Culver City, California.

== History ==
In 2000, The Steve Tisch Company merged with Todd Black and Jason Blumenthal's Black & Blu to form Escape Artists. It was originally a film financing company with a deal with Columbia Pictures, and other international backers such as Summit Entertainment and Constantin Film. The company made its origins in 1998 when Jason Blumenthal met Steve Tisch at the Cannes Film Festival. In 2001, David Alper had left New Line Cinema to join the company.

The first produced movie under the Escape Artists banner was A Knight's Tale, starring Heath Ledger in May 2001. In 2002, its relationship with Constantin Film ended and sold its stake. In the fall of 2005, Escape Artists released The Weather Man, directed by Gore Verbinski and starring Nicolas Cage and Michael Caine. Their next film, The Pursuit of Happyness, directed by Gabriele Muccino and starring Will Smith, was released in December 2006 and earned over $300 million in worldwide ticket sales, as well as best actor Academy Award and Golden Globe nominations for Will Smith. Seven Pounds, another Gabriele Muccino-directed film starring Will Smith, was released in December 2008. In 2009, Escape Artists released the Alex Proyas thriller Knowing, starring Nicolas Cage, and The Taking of Pelham 123, directed by Tony Scott and starring Denzel Washington and John Travolta. Escape Artists produced 'The Upside, which was directed by Neil Burger and starring Kevin Hart. It was released through STX Entertainment and Lantern Entertainment on January 11, 2019 in the United States. Escape Artists produced all three film adaptations of The Equalizer, with the most recent being the 2023 film The Equalizer 3. All three movies star Denzel Washington in the main role of Robert McCall.

In February 2013, 12-year veteran David Bloomfield was promoted to partner Escape Artists. In October 2014, the company inks its first-look pact with FX Productions. In August 2019, MGM Television signed its first-look deal with Escape Artists. January 30, 2026, Steve Tisch was revealed in the most recent government disclosure of the Epstein files.

== List of films ==
Year	Title	Production partners
2001	A Knight's Tale	Sony Pictures Releasing
2003	Alex & Emma	Warner Bros. Pictures, Franchise Pictures, Castle Rock Entertainment and Epsilon Motion Pictures
2005	The Weather Man	Paramount Pictures
2006	The Pursuit of Happyness	Sony Pictures Releasing and Overbrook Entertainment
2008	Seven Pounds	Sony Pictures Releasing and Overbrook Entertainment
2009	Knowing	Summit Entertainment
2009	The Taking of Pelham 123	Sony Pictures Releasing, Metro-Goldwyn-Mayer and Scott Free Productions
2010	The Back-up Plan	CBS Films
2012	Hope Springs	Sony Pictures Releasing, Metro-Goldwyn-Mayer and Mandate Pictures
2014	Sex Tape	Sony Pictures Releasing
2014	The Equalizer	Sony Pictures Releasing and Village Roadshow Pictures
2015	Unfinished Business	20th Century Fox and Regency Enterprises
2015	Southpaw	The Weinstein Company
2016	The Magnificent Seven	Sony Pictures Releasing, Metro-Goldwyn-Mayer and Village Roadshow Pictures
2016	Fences	Paramount Pictures
2017	Roman J. Israel, Esq.	Sony Pictures Releasing
2018	The Equalizer 2	Sony Pictures Releasing
2019	The Upside	STX Entertainment and Lantern Entertainment
2020	Troop Zero	Amazon Studios
2020	Ma Rainey's Black Bottom	Netflix
2021	Being the Ricardos	Amazon Studios
2021	A Journal for Jordan	Sony Pictures Releasing
2022	The Man from Toronto	Netflix and Sony Pictures Releasing
2022	Emancipation	Apple TV+
2023	The Equalizer 3	Sony Pictures Releasing
2023	Cassandro	Amazon Studios
2024	The Piano Lesson	Netflix
2025	Highest 2 Lowest	Apple TV+ and A24
2026	Masters of the Universe	Amazon MGM Studios, Metro-Goldwyn-Mayer, Mattel Films, and Truenorth Productions
2026	Voicemails for Isabelle	Netflix and Sony Pictures Releasing
2026	The Social Reckoning	Sony Pictures Releasing and Alcon Entertainment
2026	Madden	Amazon MGM Studios and Metro-Goldwyn-Mayer
TBA	Masters of the Universe 2	Amazon MGM Studios, Metro-Goldwyn-Mayer, Mattel Films, and Truenorth Productions
TBA	Thomas & Friends	Amazon MGM Studios, Metro-Goldwyn-Mayer, Mattel Films, and 2DUX^{2}
TBA	Viewmaster	Sony Pictures Releasing and Mattel Films

== List of television shows ==
Year	Title	Network	Production partners
2019	Perpetual Grace, LTD	Epix	MGM Television, Chi-Town Pictures, Elephant Pictures and FXP
2019	Why We Hate	Discovery Channel	Amblin Television and Jigsaw Productions
2019–2023	Servant	Apple TV+	Blinding Edge Pictures and Dolphin Black Productions
2021–2023	Dr. Death	Peacock	Universal Content Productions, Wondery and Littleton Road Productions
2023	Desperately Seeking Soulmate: Escaping Twin Flames Universe	Amazon Prime Video	Amazon Studios, MGM Television, Dorothy Street Pictures & PMZ Pictures
2025	Untamed	Netflix	Bee Holder Productions, John Wells Productions and Warner Bros. Television
2026	DTF St. Louis	HBO	MGM Television, Bravo Axolotl, Elephant Pictures and Aggregate Films
