= Patriot (TV series) =

US television program

- Genre: Comedy drama; Black comedy; Political drama; Spy drama
- Created by: Steven Conrad
- Starring: Michael Dorman; Kurtwood Smith; Michael Chernus; Kathleen Munroe; Aliette Opheim; Chris Conrad; Terry O'Quinn; Debra Winger
- Opening theme: "Train Song" by Vashti Bunyan (season 1); "Sure Shot" by Beastie Boys (season 2)
- Composer: Alex Wurman
- Country of origin: United States
- Original language: English
- No. of seasons: 2
- No. of episodes: 18

Production
- Executive producers: Steven Conrad; Glenn Ficarra; John Requa; Gil Bellows; Charlie Gogolak
- Producer: Marc David Alpert
- Running time: 37–57 minutes
- Production companies: Elephant Pictures; Zaftig Films; Parriott; Picrow; Amazon Studios; Reunion Pictures (pilot)

Original release
- Network: Amazon Prime Video
- Release: November 5, 2015 – November 9, 2018

Patriot is an American comedy-drama television series created by Steven Conrad. The first episode premiered on Amazon Prime Video on November 5, 2015, as part of its Pilot Season initiative, and the complete first season was released on February 23, 2017. It stars Michael Dorman, Kurtwood Smith, Michael Chernus, Kathleen Munroe, Aliette Opheim, Chris Conrad, Terry O'Quinn and Debra Winger. In April 2017, Amazon announced that it had renewed the series for a second season, which premiered on November 9, 2018. In July 2019, Amazon announced that it had no plans for a third season.

== Premise ==
To prevent Iran from going nuclear, intelligence officer John Tavner must forgo all safety nets and assume a perilous non-official cover ("NOC") of a mid-level employee at a Milwaukee industrial piping firm.

== Cast and characters ==
=== Main ===
- Michael Dorman as John Tavner / John Lakeman, a troubled intelligence officer and folk singer posing as an industrial engineer
- Kurtwood Smith as Leslie Claret, John's boss at McMillan, his engineering firm
- Michael Chernus as Edward Tavner / 'Cool Rick', John's easygoing brother and a Texas congressman
- Kathleen Munroe as Alice Tavner, John's wife
- Aliette Opheim as Detective Agathe Albans, a Luxembourg homicide detective who crosses paths with John
- Chris Conrad as Dennis McClaren, John's coworker and self-described best friend
- Terry O'Quinn as Tom Tavner, John and Edward's father and a Director of Intelligence
- Debra Winger as Bernice Tavner (season 2), John's mother and the United States Secretary of Transportation.

=== Recurring ===
- Julian Richings as Peter Icabod, John's off-putting coworker
- Gil Bellows as Lawrence Lacroix, a McMillan executive
- Marcus Toji as Stephen Tchoo, John's brain-damaged coworker
- Tony Fitzpatrick as Jack Birdbath, a disgraced ex-cop and McMillan security guard
- Sylvie Sadarnac as Detective Lucie Prum-Waltzing, Agathe's colleague
- Charlotte Arnold as Ally O'Dhonaill, Stephen's nurse
- Sadieh Rifai as Mahtma El-Mashad, the wife of a nuclear physicist sent to pick up money for Walley
- Hana Mae Lee as Numi Haruno, a puppeteer, escort, and petty thief who causes trouble throughout Luxembourg
- Zoe Schwartz as Sophie, Agathe's colleague
- Kane Mahon as Mikham Candahar, an agent working for Walley
- Antoine McKay as Gregory Gordon, a human resources worker at McMillan
- Azhar Usman as Kkyman Candahar, Mikham's easygoing brother
- Sabina Zeynalova as Sandrine Gernsback, Agathe's colleague
- Matthew Lunt as Detective Emile Mills, Agathe's colleague
- Norm Sousa as Edgar Barros, an airport worker who causes problems for John
- Jaclyn Hennell as Lori, a McMillan worker with whom Lacroix is infatuated
- Mark Boone Junior as Rob Saperstein, John's friend and a fellow folk singer
- Jay Abdo as Cantar Walley, a pro-nuclear, anti-Israel candidate for Iran's presidency
- Luc Schwarz as Sergeant Guy-Paul Poullian (season 2), a Luxembourg police detective taking the case from Agathe
- Eye Haïdara as Detective Nan Ntep (season 2), a French homicide detective
- Jolie Olympia Choko as Myna Albans, Agathe's young daughter
- Cindy Bossan as Detective Sandrine Gernsback (season 2), Agathe's colleague

== Episodes ==
Season	Episodes	Originally released	
Season	Episodes	First released	Last released
1	10	November 3, 2015	February 23, 2017
2	8	November 9, 2018	

=== Season 1 (2015–17) ===
No. overall	No. in season	Title	Directed by	Written by	Original release date
1	1	"Milwaukee, America"	Steven Conrad	Story by : Steven Conrad and Gil Bellows; Teleplay by : Steven Conrad	November 3, 2015
In 2012, the leading candidate for Iran's presidency dies, leaving pro-nuclear candidate Cantar Walley the most likely to win the upcoming election. CIA executive Tom Tavner gets his operative son John a job at McMillan, a Milwaukee engineering firm that often travels to Luxembourg, where John will hand off money to support a rival moderate candidate. John's congressman brother Edward is sent to fetch him from Amsterdam, where he is recovering from being detained on a failed mission and subjected to extreme white torture. He agrees to go back if he loses a mechanical bull competition, which he throws. He pushes Stephen Tchoo in front of a van to secure the job and has McMillan worker Dennis McClaren provide urine so he can pass a drug test. The money bag is stolen by airport worker Edgar Barros upon arrival in Luxembourg. John stabs Dennis to deter him while going to confront Barros. He is attacked by Barros's brothers and kills one to escape with the bag, unwittingly giving it to Walley's agent Mikham Candahar. Arriving late to a meeting because of his detour, John's boss Leslie Claret tells him that he will not be returning to Luxembourg.
2	2	"C-19"	Steven Conrad	Steven Conrad	February 23, 2017
Investigating Barros's brother, Homicide detective Agathe Albans attempts to interview Dennis in America about his stabbing, but Tom uses his Interpol connections to stall her. John's wife Alice tries and fails to get out of Edward what they do for work. McMillan security guard and disgraced ex-cop Jack Birdbath reveals that he overheard John getting Dennis's urine. He blackmails him into handicapping several disabled cops that guard a local police evidence room, including stealing a therapy dog named Charlie, and has him plant a box inside the room. Furious with John parking in his reserved spot, Leslie threatens to fire him again. He waits for John to arrive, who stops when he almost hits an arriving Agathe.
3	3	"McMillan Man"	Steven Conrad	Steven Conrad	February 23, 2017
In the early 2000s, Leslie goes to jail for embezzling his engineering company's funds to feed his cocaine addiction. He gets a job at McMillan, but is told he will never advance past divisional management. In the present, John avoids parking in Leslie's spot, but performs poorly in a meeting and realizes he is close to being fired. Tom's Interpol contact dies of a stroke, allowing Agathe to come to America, where she interviews Dennis. John coaches him beforehand and he performs passably, but mentions John's fake name. John goes to the company duck hunt to try and set things right with his Leslie, who rebuffs him. He reluctantly shoots down ducks for executive Lawrence Lacroix, who wants to impress a female subordinate. After learning how important Charlie is to his owner, he lets him go home.
4	4	"John's To-Do List 5/18/12"	Steven Conrad	Bruce Terris	February 23, 2017
John returns to Luxembourg and kidnaps Barros, putting him inside a hiking backpack. Suspicious of Edward after an interview, Agathe sends her colleague to follow him, preventing him from taking the bag. John tracks Mikham to his hotel, but Barros's struggling alerts Mikham, who flees. John is unable to find the money, but steals a safe from the room. John hands Barros and the safe off to Edward and Dennis before performing well at a McMillan conference. He notices Rob Saperstein, a musician with whom he once recorded music, giving their CD with their photo on its cover to Agathe. Dennis and Edward break the safe by dropping it from several floors up and find the passport of Japanese puppeteer Numi Haruno inside. John follows Agathe to her apartment but collapses from exhaustion right outside her door.
5	5	"Un Monsieur Triste En Costume"	Ted Griffin	Steven Conrad	February 23, 2017
John meets Saperstein while in Amsterdam and the two record a full album the same night they meet. In the present, John breaks into Agathe's apartment but finds she has taken the CD as he is seen by her young daughter Myna. He trades Barros back to his brother and bribes them to leave him alone, but they still plan to kill him. Tom has Edward befriend Mikham's brother Kkyman to learn Mikham's location, where John follows him to and kills him. He goes to Belgium to perform with Saperstein, but forgets the lyrics to their song and starts singing about his regrets about Leslie's view of him. Returning to Luxembourg, he finds the bag that held the money lying in the street.
6	6	"The Structural Dynamics of Flow"	Tucker Gates	Jill E. Blotevogel	February 23, 2017
The day John gave the money to Mikham, Numi steals it from him and is later arrested for other petty thefts. Several McMillan workers, including John, are called to the police station to be interviewed about the night of Barros's murder. The others implicate John as unaccounted for while he notices the bag, which has an elastic airport tag with his name on it, being transported through the station. Myna spots him again while he tries to steal it. He tries to pull the tag off when the cart passes, but it does not break. Edward goes to the library to write John's name in the borrower's log of Leslie's piping book to provide an alibi, but finds that all the copies have been checked out. He alerts John, who flees the station before he can be interviewed.
7	7	"Hello, is Charlie There?"	Michael Trim	Darby Kealey	February 23, 2017
An increasingly disconnected John calls Charlie's owner and asks to speak to the dog. Stephen, who has returned to work with brain damage, is recovering, and John realizes he may be able to identify him as the man who pushed him, so he tries to impede Stephen's recovery. Lacroix tells Leslie that McMillan is going bankrupt, and Leslie agrees to help save it in exchange for firing John, which Lacroix agrees to do after the next duck hunt. Alice listens to a recorded song from John, where he expresses suicidal ideation and desires to be free of his work, spending his evenings riding his bike haphazardly through traffic. She books a flight to Milwaukee, unknowingly reserving a seat next to Agathe, who is going to interview John.
8	8	"L'Affaire Contre John Lakeman"	Jim Whitaker	Zak Schwartz	February 23, 2017
Before he can pull John out to keep him away from Agathe, Tom learns the date in which a woman will come to pick up the money and orders him to stay put. John steals a copy of Leslie's checked-out book from his office and writes his name inside. Birdbath was acquitted as a policeman for shooting a child while drunk, and the box John planted was supposed to prove his guilt. He asks John to kill him at work to increase the life insurance money that can be sent to the child's family. Alice notices Agathe struggling to secure a rental car and drives with her to Milwaukee. John practices writing with his left hand to pass the test with which Agathe intends to link him to the Barros murder. While entering the office, Leslie asks him to draw a circle to save his job, forcing him to do so poorly with his left hand and enraging Leslie. Before John can kill Birdbath, Dennis, sent by Alice, intercepts him, leading him to realize Agathe is following them. She plays rock paper scissors with John to decide which day they interview and wins. John receives a song from Saperstein that acts as a suicide note, and he tells Agathe that he is not actually an engineer.
9	9	"Dick Cheney"	Steven Conrad	Steven Conrad & Bruce Terris	February 23, 2017
John claims that he faked his credentials and that he was late to Leslie's meeting because he was studying the book. He passes the handwriting test, and Edward, having received the book after it was mailed to Luxembourg, sneaks it into the library moments before Agathe's colleague arrives to check it. John goes to see Alice, but Tom, having learned that Agathe is in the room next to her, stops him. Alice discovers that she is a police officer and goes through her room, learning that John is being investigated for murder. Tom accompanies John on the duck hunt and fails to convince Leslie to keep him. Birdbath expresses anger at John for not killing him, but ultimately decides that he wants to keep living and does not report him. Tom tells John a story about how Dick Cheney accidentally shot a man while out hunting and suggests doing the same to Leslie.
10	10	"Dead Serious Rick"	Steven Conrad	Steven Conrad & Bruce Terris	February 23, 2017
John fulfills the request for physical contact from Peter Ichabod to maintain his cover, since Icabod knows he faked his credentials. He non-fatally shoots Leslie in the head, opening a spot on the Luxembourg team. Stephen, now almost confident that John pushed him, is pushed in front of another van by John. Mikham's body is found and he is implicated as Barros' murderer, although Myna insists to Agathe that she saw John in their house. Agathe calls Leslie, who confirms John was at their meeting with the money bag. Tom orders John to kill El-Mashad, but he instead goes for a bike ride and gets hit by a car. Edward tries to stop John from returning to El-Mashad, but Tom orders him to go. John dispatches Kkyman, now working for Walley, and a Barros brother, and reaches Numi. She left the money with the police, only wanting the bag for her puppet show. Agathe takes the money and John follows her to a train station, where she offers to let him off the hook for the murder if he lets her go. Tom calls him to say that Edward was kidnapped and they need the money as Agathe gets on the train.

=== Season 2 (2018) ===
No. overall	No. in season	Title	Directed by	Written by	Original release date
11	1	"American Dimes"	Steven Conrad	Steven Conrad	November 9, 2018
John lets Agathe's Paris-bound train go, only to come to his senses and get on the next one, on which Myna and her aunt are passengers. He compulsively calls his mother Bernice, who senses something is off. Alice intercepts him at the airport with Charlie in tow, promising that she still loves him despite the nature of his work and will stay if he needs her. He kidnaps Myna and meets with Tom, although Alice takes her and leaves in disgust when Tom continues to push the plan. He tells John that if he cannot recover the money, he will have to kill Walley when he visits Paris soon. Birdbath, acting as backup in case El-Mashad got the money, is ordered by John to steal it back from Agathe, but he knocks himself out while trying to ambush her. Agathe calls Myna and learns that she is with Alice, who is told to temporarily keep Myna, knowing she is not in danger.
12	2	"The Vantasner Danger Meridian"	Steven Conrad	Steven Conrad	November 9, 2018
In a flashback, Alice crosses paths with Charlie's owner while he investigates John and learns that the dog may benefit her husband. She steals Charlie, and the owner resolves to find John with his fellow evidence guards. Leslie's cocaine addiction resurfaces after he is put on morphine without his consent following his shooting, getting him kicked out of his support group. He agrees to be interviewed by a group of male detectives in Luxembourg who are trying to outperform the women. Tom convinces Alice to come to Paris with them. John realizes that the videos of Edward being tortured are faked by him and Dennis in an attempt to get John out of the mission. John prepares to break into the building that holds restricted information on all the gun owners in Paris by jumping off a high balcony, and he asks Edward and Dennis to come help him.
13	3	"The Guns of Paris"	Steven Conrad	Steven Conrad	November 9, 2018
Mikham and Kkyman's father Wallace swears to Kkyman that he will kill John himself. Tom intercepts Leslie at the airport and explains the truth about John, who makes his jump and steals the information of an armed grocer. John attacks the grocer with his friends, but he and Dennis each lose two fingers in the process and escape on the subway, where they realize they left one of John's fingers behind. As a police officer gets on the subway, John leads him away from the others with his blood trail, only to wind up next to Tom and Leslie, who saves him by pretending the blood is a cocaine-induced nosebleed. John admits to Tom that he had been fingerprinted as a teenager and can therefore be identified. They return to the store to get the finger just as the grocer, who recognizes John, is describing the incident to detective Nan Ntep.
14	4	"The Sword and the Hand"	Steven Conrad	Steven Conrad	November 9, 2018
John bashes Ntep's head with a metal rack and steals combat items from her car trunk, along with his finger. He and Tom realize Walley's car is passing, and John attempts to kill him but is distracted by seeing Agathe, shooting in her direction. He meets Bernice on the next train, and he decides to shoot a Romanian child trafficker to make up for his failure, but his missing fingers hurt his aim and he instead non-fatally shoots a child. Agathe explains to Alice that she took the money to lure John away from her uninvolved coworkers, and that her goal is to have Tom arrested. She promises Alice that John will go free if she helps arrest Tom. While on a train, Agathe's misogynistic colleague insults Myna and recognizes John, so he shoots the man in the chest.
15	5	"Army of Strangers"	Steven Conrad	Steven Conrad	November 9, 2018
Bernice takes John and Dennis to the hospital despite Tom's protests, where they get their fingers reattached. John's registry into the hospital's system alerts the Milwaukee and Luxembourg police, as well as Walley's security, to his position. While recovering, John learns that Ntep has gone temporarily blind from his attack. Edward decides to marry Carol, the mother of his son, and decides to have his bachelor party immediately while Tom allows John a couple days of rest. Leslie tries to visit his estranged son, who he made contact before the return of his addiction, but is kicked out when he tries to cut his grandson's hair with a knife. Walley's security detail plans to move him from Paris after nightfall.
16	6	"Fuck John Wayne"	Steven Conrad	Steven Conrad	November 9, 2018
Everyone except Edward's parents attend his party, including Saperstein, getting intoxicated and wandering the streets of Paris. They buy the child John shot from his owner and set him free, and easily fight off the Milwaukee cops when they try to arrest John. Ron informs John of Walley's upcoming departure. John steals a pair of earrings to give to Ntep. Her father stops him, and he decides to kill Walley alone.
17	7	"Loaded"	Steven Conrad	Steven Conrad	November 9, 2018
In a flashback, Wallace is revealed to be the one who hit John in Luxembourg and drove him to the hospital, telling Tom that he believes John let himself be hit. Agathe is revealed to have gotten Tom's name through John naming him as his next of kin. In the present, John breaks into Walley's compound, sustaining severe injuries in the process, and just before he can break into Walley's office and face certain death against his guards, Tom calls him off. Wallace finally catches up to John, only to be immediately killed. Agathe talks to Ntep and realizes she encountered John in the grocery store. Unwilling to let John continue working, Alice contacts Agathe and returns Myna to her aunt, prompting Agathe to return the money to John in order to trap Tom.
18	8	"Escape From Paris"	Steven Conrad	Steven Conrad	November 9, 2018
John has Leslie pull his teeth to bypass facial recognition software. As Tom and Alice arrive in his hotel room, the police arrive to arrest Tom, forcing him and John to jump off the balcony to escape. With John's encouragement, Leslie fights his addiction and salvages McMillan, which is floundering under Lacroix, getting them back on the path to working in Iran. Tom is caught and arrested, but Bernice provides an alibi of them going to Edward's wedding, which only they attend. John bypasses a fingerprint scanner, having had his fingers switched with Dennis's, and buys a boat ticket to appear as though he is leaving by ferry. He swims into the English Channel with the money tied to his ankle, where he plans to meet up with James, a British intelligence officer he met while they were under torture. He almost makes it to the meeting point, the maritime boundary between France and England, but finds himself surrounded by jellyfish and almost gives up until James arrives and rescues him. He promises John that he will be okay as they leave, and John responds "cool" as he looks back towards France and his eyes fill up with tears.

== Production ==
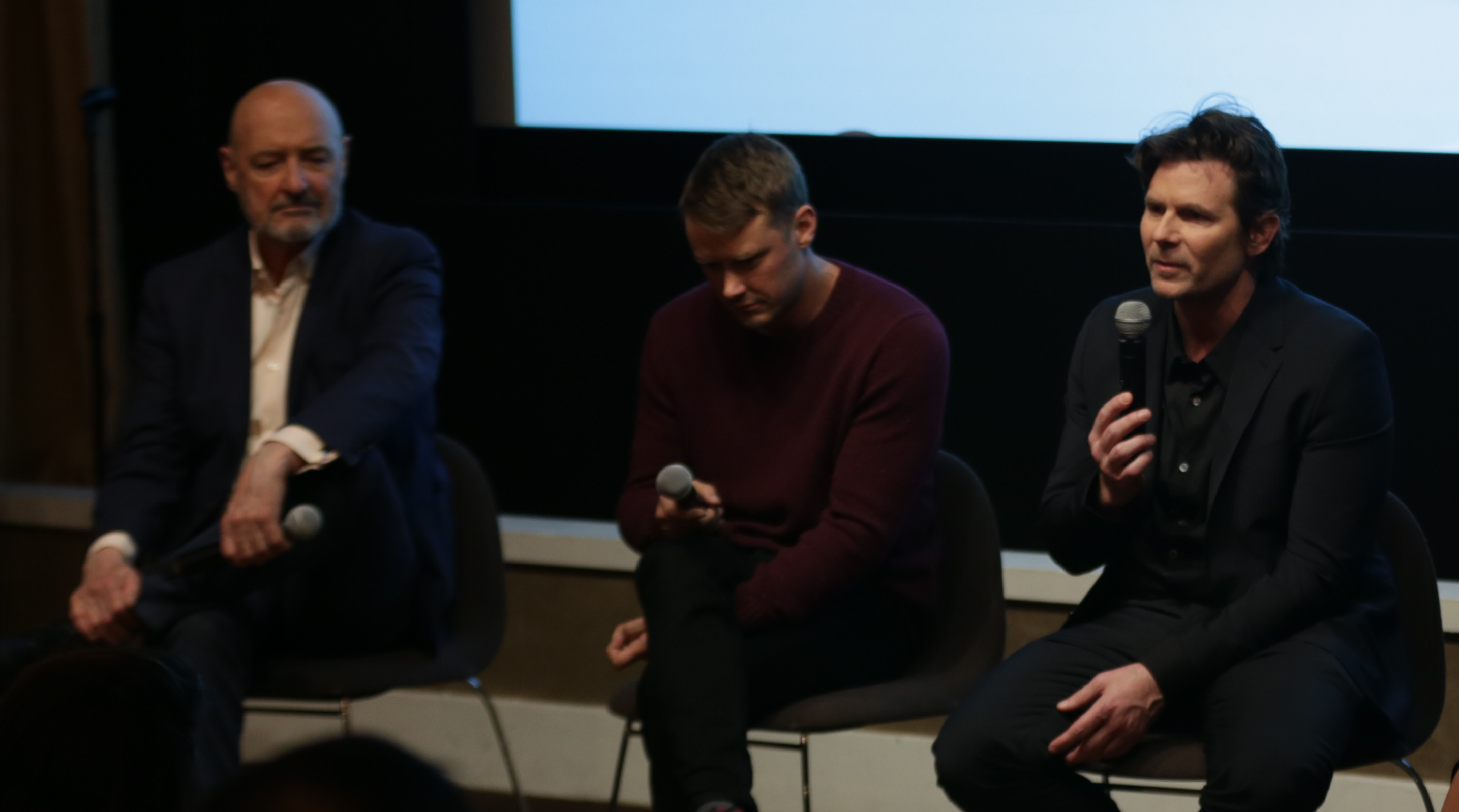
Actors Terry O'Quinn and Michael Dorman and screenwriter Steve Conrad discuss Patriot for New America in 2017.

=== Development ===
On May 14, 2015, it was reported that Amazon had given the production, written by Steven Conrad and then titled The Patriot, a pilot order. On September 23, 2015, the series' pilot order was confirmed and further information regarding the series was released. It was announced that the series had been retitled Patriot and that Conrad was confirmed to direct the pilot episode and executive produce alongside Gil Bellows, Glenn Ficarra, Charlie Gogolak, and John Requa.

On December 18, 2015, it was announced that the production had been given a series order. On January 27, 2017, it was reported that the rest of season one would premiere in its entirety on February 24, 2017.

On April 18, 2017, it was announced that the series had been renewed for a second season. On October 10, 2018, it was announced that the second season would premiere on November 9, 2018.

=== Casting ===
In August 2015, it was announced that Kurtwood Smith, Michael Dorman, Kathleen Munroe, and Terry O'Quinn had been cast in the pilot's lead roles. On March 22, 2016, it was reported that Chris Conrad, previously cast in a guest appearance in the pilot episode, had been upped to a series regular capacity for the remainder of season one.

On January 4, 2018, it was announced that Debra Winger had been cast in a series regular role for season two.

=== Filming ===
Principal photography for the first season commenced in the spring of 2016 in Chicago, Illinois. The Luxembourg scenes were shot in Prague, Czech Republic.

== Reception ==
Critical response of Patriot
Season	Rotten Tomatoes	Metacritic
1	82% (28 reviews)	68 (16 reviews)
2	100% (6 reviews)	80 (4 reviews)

On Rotten Tomatoes it received an overall score of 91%, and an overall score of 71 on Metacritic.

=== Season 1 ===
The first season met with positive critical response. On the review aggregation website Rotten Tomatoes, the first season holds an 82% approval rating with an average rating of 6.5 out of 10 based on 28 reviews. The website's critical consensus reads, "Patriot is dark, quirky, and often funny -- and although its risks don't always pay off, the series is still savvy and inspired enough to watch." Metacritic, which uses a weighted average, assigned the season a score of 68 out of 100 based on 16 critics, indicating "generally favorable reviews".

Many of the first season's Luxembourg-based exterior scenes were filmed in Prague. The Luxemburger Wort's culture correspondent noted the apparent lack of effort and accuracy in portraying the landmarks and geography that characterize Luxembourg City, with Prague being an amusing substitute for their depiction. He recorded that the frequent onscreen appearance of unmistakable famous Prague landmarks, such as the Charles Bridge, throughout Luxembourg shots hinder the suspension of disbelief for viewers familiar with either location. Furthermore, Czech licence plates, websites ending in .cz instead of .lu and prices in Czech korunas instead of euros are visible in the "Luxembourg scenes" that show the low effort imitating Luxembourg. Additionally, factual inaccuracies about Luxembourg exist in the script, including a claim that Brazilian nationals make up a substantial minority of Luxembourg residents, when in fact it is Portuguese nationals. Despite what he labeled as these "absurd inaccuracies" he recommended the series for fans of dark comedy.

=== Season 2 ===
The second season also received positive reviews from critics. On Rotten Tomatoes, it holds a 100% approval rating with an average rating of 6.7 out of 10 based on 11 reviews. The website's critical consensus reads, "Patriot's second season is dark as pitch and ticks along to a slow-burning surreality, but viewers who are willing to invest in the series' moody pleasures will find themselves infiltrated by its scabrous humor and crackerjack dialogue." On Metacritic, it has a score of 80 out of 100 based on 4 critics, indicating "generally favorable reviews".

=== Awards and nominations ===
Year	Ceremony	Category	Recipient(s)	Result
2017	8th Critics' Choice Television Awards	Best Comedy Series	Patriot	Nominated
