= Perpetual Grace, LTD =

- Genre: Neo-noir; Thriller
- Created by: Steven Conrad; Bruce Terris
- Starring: Ben Kingsley; Jimmi Simpson; Luis Guzmán; Damon Herriman; Chris Conrad; Jacki Weaver
- Opening theme: "Comet" by The Jones Sisters
- Ending theme: "Y'all Bless Me Down" by The Jones Sisters
- Composer: Alex Wurman
- Country of origin: United States
- Original language: English
- No. of seasons: 1
- No. of episodes: 10

Production
- Executive producers: Steven Conrad; Bruce Terris; Todd Black; Jason Blumenthal; Steve Tisch
- Production location: New Mexico
- Running time: 47–63 minutes
- Production companies: Escape Artists; Chi-Town Pictures; Elephant Pictures; FXP; MGM Television

Original release
- Network: Epix
- Release: June 2 – August 4, 2019

Perpetual Grace, LTD is an American neo-noir thriller television series that premiered on Epix on June 2, 2019.

The series is produced by MGM Television and FX Productions, with co-creators Steven Conrad and Bruce Terris writing each episode. The main cast features Ben Kingsley, Jimmi Simpson, Luis Guzmán, Damon Herriman, Chris Conrad, and Jacki Weaver; with Terry O'Quinn, Kurtwood Smith, Timothy Spall, and Michael Chernus in recurring roles.

On January 30, 2020, it was announced by Epix that the series was not renewed for a second season, but was planned to conclude with a limited run. However, Conrad stated, "under these terms, never going to happen".

== Premise ==
Perpetual Grace, LTD follows "James, a young grifter, as he attempts to prey upon Pastor Byron Brown, who turns out to be far more dangerous than he suspects."

== Cast and characters ==
=== Main ===
- Ben Kingsley as Byron "Pa" Brown – A dangerous and manipulative pastor who runs a rehabilitation center, which he uses to steal from those he helps
- Jimmi Simpson as James Schaeler – A disturbed ex-firefighter who is roped into Paul's scheme
- Luis Guzmán as Hector Contreras – A Hermosillo sheriff who is tasked with imprisoning Ma and Pa
- Damon Herriman as Paul Allen Brown – Ma and Pa's delinquent magician son who schemes to steal their money
- Chris Conrad as Tracy "New Leaf" Connelly – One of Ma and Pa's former victims who believes that Paul is responsible for his misery
- Jacki Weaver as Lillian "Ma" Brown – Pa's less violent but equally cunning wife

=== Recurring ===
- Terry O'Quinn as Wesley Walker, a Texas Ranger who suspects Paul of murder
- Kurtwood Smith as Dave Lesser, Lillian's falsely convicted sex offender foster brother
- Timothy Spall as Donald DeLoash, a former criminal associate of Pa's
- Michael Chernus as Everly Pirdoo, the town alcoholic and Glenn's father
- Efren Ramirez as Felipe Guillermo Usted, a Mexican coroner who aids in Paul's scheme
- Hana Mae Lee as Scotty Sholes, Pa's church's sardonic parishioner
- Dana DeLorenzo as Valerie Spoonts, a crude car saleswoman who recruits Hector to be part of Paul's scheme
- Veronica Falcón as Clara, a cartel woman who seeks to kill Pa
- Dash Williams as Glenn Pirdoo, a fifteen-year-old boy forced to work in his father's pawn shop
- Eliana Alexander as Marisol Contreras, Hector's loving wife
- Alonso Alvarez as Emile Contreras, Hector's lazy son
- Calvin Benuto as Matthias Contreras, Hector's lazy son

== Episodes ==
No.	Title	Directed by	Written by	Original release date
1	"Eleven"	Steven Conrad	Steven Conrad & Bruce Terris	June 2, 2019
Magician Paul Allen Brown and car saleswoman Valerie Spoontz devise a plan to rip off his parents, pastor Byron "Pa" and Lillian "Ma" Brown. They run a rehabilitation program out of their church, Our Lady of Perpetual Grace, in Half Acre, New Mexico that steals money from their clients. Paul enlists James Schaeler, a disillusioned firefighter who abandoned his partner to die on the job and wants to give money to the man's children. He instructs James to get addicted to methadone, enter the program, convince them that Paul is in a prison in Hermosillo, Mexico, and have them legally declared dead after they are imprisoned by Hector Contreras, a sheriff that Valerie is having an affair with. James will pose as Paul to take the money from the Browns' trust fund. He enters the program, and fabricates a drug stash by robbing a pawn shop, buying drugs, and planting them, but is forced to give the young clerk, Glenn Pirdoo, a head injury. Ma and Pa go to Hermosillo when James claims Paul is there, and Hector locks them up, only for Pa to murder an inmate when he makes Ma uncomfortable. Having applied for a new driver's license as Paul, James is approached by Texas Ranger Wesley Walker, who detains him as Paul is a person of interest in the murder of a young girl named Theresa Williams. James is placed in a cell with a man who has Paul's name tattooed across his chest.
2	"Orphan Comb Death Fight"	Steven Conrad	Steven Conrad & Bruce Terris	June 9, 2019
The man in the cell, Tracy "New Leaf" Connelly, is a convicted murderer that opened a LensCrafters in town that relied on Pa's funding to operate. The store closes and New Leaf's parents lose their funds, and Pa blames it on Paul stealing their money. New Leaf is later imprisoned after attacking a man at his job. Walker attaches an ankle monitor to James, and New Leaf is released from jail and warns him that he must reimburse him for the money Paul took. James meets with Scotty Sholes, Perpetual Grace's parishioner and one of Pa's former clients, who tells him that it will take ninety days to get the money, not two weeks like Paul claimed. Hector calls, needing money to prevent his wife Marisol from finding out about a bracelet he bought for Valerie, but James is unable to leave town. Pa mocks Hector for his weight and inefficiency as he is transported to a more secure prison, provoking Hector into buying beer. He convinces Hector to let him have one and quietly begins to cut his own thumb off using the can.
3	"Felipe G. Usted. Almost First Mexican on the Moon. Part 1"	James Whitaker	Steven Conrad & Bruce Terris	June 16, 2019
Pa finishes cutting, escapes from his handcuffs, and drives to Hermosillo after finding Hector's address in his wallet, where he approaches his two sons. Hector falsely reports the truck as having a cartel member inside, knowing the cartel will pick it up and the driver will be killed, but Esteban, the elderly hitman they send, mistakes an ice cream vendor's van for Hector's covert transport vehicle and kills him. After Hector informs James that Pa has escaped and he needs to seek out Felipe Guillermo Usted, the Hermosillo coroner that helped fake Ma and Pa's deaths, James allows himself to be bitten by a rattlesnake so he will have his ankle bracelet removed in the hospital. He is waylaid by Dave Lesser, Ma's foster brother and a falsely convicted sex offender, who has come to check on her after not hearing from her. James reluctantly calls the police to have him arrested, allowing him to go to the hospital, where New Leaf shows him his ill parents and informs James that he will kill him if he has not paid his debt by the time they die. James convinces New Leaf to help him escape as Dave and Walker arrive, and he sends Glenn, his injury having made him sensitive to light and sound, to Mexico to drop off Hector's money.
4	"Felipe G. Usted. Almost First Mexican on the Moon. Part 2"	James Whitaker	Steven Conrad & Bruce Terris	June 23, 2019
James goes to Houston to meet with Usted, an aspiring astronaut who has almost completed his training, and forces him to go back to Mexico and delay Pa's death certificate, ending his chances of going to space. Glenn gets lost in the desert after losing his protective gear until he arrives at a filling station, where he meets a friendly motorist who takes him to Hermosillo. He meets up with James and New Leaf, and he delivers the money just as Marisol buys Hector a Father's Day present. Ma escapes the prison by getting an abused prisoner to sit with her during the exercise period and tying her hair to a passing train, causing a distraction, but Hector catches her. Hector's sons sense something is off and leave for Sunday school, but Pa stalks them and enters their classroom during a Father's Day presentation.
5	"Wandering Left"	Steven Conrad	Steven Conrad & Bruce Terris	June 30, 2019
In a flashback, James meets Paul and Valerie when he crashes his car through the window of Valerie's car dealership, hoping to sell his car and give the money to his partner's family. Hector buries Ma and leaves her with a straw to breathe out of, but a donkey eats it. Pa almost pulls his gun, but stops when a police officer enters the classroom. He instead convinces the boys that he is their real father and takes them home, having restrained them just as Marisol returns. After Everly, Glenn's alcoholic father, reports his son missing, Walker suspects "Paul" is repeating Williams's murder and convinces Dave to give him letters he and Paul wrote to each other, where Paul says he is going to "make a little girl disappear." He uses this to get a warrant for James's arrest. The police instead arrest New Leaf, who is wearing James's ankle monitor.
6	"When Doves Cry"	Steven Conrad	Steven Conrad & Bruce Terris	July 7, 2019
Clara, the mother of the man Pa killed in prison and a cartel higher-up, sends a trio of women to track Pa down. James escapes back to Half Acre and talks about what to do next with Paul, and they are overheard by Scotty. After humiliating Hector in front of his family, Pa forces him to take him to where he buried Ma, only for him to realize the breathing straw is gone. Unable to hear Ma's calls for help over the sound of a crying dove, Hector and Pa cut down the tree it is perched in and drag the tree away when Pa realizes it fell where Ma is buried. He rescues her and takes Hector's gun, who returns home with a newfound appreciation for his family. The couple encounter the cartel women and force them to stop with Hector's gun.
7	"Bull Face"	James Whitaker	Steven Conrad & Bruce Terris	July 14, 2019
In a flashback, James explains his true identity and his plan to New Leaf, convincing him to put on his ankle monitor. Scotty demands a cut of the scheme's profits in exchange for pulling the funds in two weeks, while Paul convinces Dave to stop talking to Walker. Dave asks that Ma and Pa be given a proper funeral, and the undertaker he hires asks James for their bodies. James reveals his identity to Glenn and tells him that, in times of crisis, he calls his father Steve, an astronaut who went insane while in space and refuses to take his suit off, but he never answers the phone. He convinces Glenn to give Everly another chance, and he gives his father a sombrero he bought in Mexico. New Leaf convinces Walker of his innocence, claiming the monitor was put on by mistake, although Walker notices Everly's sombrero. New Leaf sells the last of his LensCrafters merchandise to Everly after his parents die and purchases a gun. Donald DeLoash, the man Pa committed his first murder with when they were young and who Pa has been paying to be kept in prison, is released and travels to America. He ends up on Cash Cab and wins a record amount of money. Ma and Pa force the women to take them to Clara, but are captured by the cartel when they arrive.
8	"Fiveever"	James Whitaker	Steven Conrad	July 21, 2019
In a flashback, Williams, Paul's magician protege, overhears him discussing a scheme and expresses discomfort. Paul promises her he will not go through with it, but she is shown dead some time later by a river. New Leaf prepares to kill James, but Paul reveals himself to save James and convinces him that he was not responsible for his parents' bankruptcy. Hector tells the group that he no longer wants to participate in their scheme. Walker gets Glenn to admit that he was in Mexico and detains James, demanding to know where he has been. Paul asks New Leaf if they can use his parents' bodies to act as Ma and Pa's, and to gain his trust, he admits to him that he handcuffed Williams so she would not interfere with his scheme and that she likely drowned while trying to unlock them with water, something he will have to live with forever.
9	"The Elements of an Epiphany"	Steven Conrad	Steven Conrad	July 28, 2019
Pa tries to convince Clara not to kill him, blaming the death of her son on James getting them locked up in the first place and promising to kill him if she releases them. Valerie attempts to blackmail Hector into getting Pa, but he insists that the cartel will kill him. James convinces Walker, who is told that he only has one more day to close the case, that he was fishing with Everly while Glenn and New Leaf were in Mexico. He uses what Paul told him about Williams to clear himself of suspicion of her death and demonstrates a levitation trick that Paul taught him when asked. DeLoash arrives in Half Acre and identifies New Leaf as the most dangerous criminal currently in town, confronting him and manipulating him into an epiphany. He leaves his gun for DeLoash to take, who plans to use it to get back money Pa owes him, which he believes James has. Glenn hitchhikes to Austin and meets Steve, who he convinces to come back to Half Acre with him.
10	"A Sheriff in The Era of The Cartel"	Steven Conrad	Steven Conrad & Bruce Terris	August 4, 2019
After deciding to go legitimate, New Leaf helps James and Paul run over his parents in a car carrier trailer and pass them off as Ma and Pa to the undertaker. Paul decides he is going to turn himself in for manslaughter regarding Williams after he uses his cut of the money. James calls Hector and learns of Pa's predicament, and, unaware of the extent of Pa's evil, orders Hector to save him. Walker quickly deduces Everly is lying about the fishing story, so James makes up another one where he claims he was having an affair with the married Scotty. Walker agrees to take Dave to the funeral and finally decides to give up on the case until he finds a picture of Ma and the real Paul together that Dave had given him. Esteban forces Pa to dig his own grave, but Hector arrives and kills him, only for Pa to take Esteban's gun and kill Hector with it. He and Ma leave in Hector's police vehicle for Half Acre. The people of Half Acre attend Ma and Pa's funeral, as well as Dave, Walker, DeLoash, and Steve. James prepares to give a eulogy, looks at the crowd, and awkwardly starts with "hey..."

== Production ==
=== Development ===
On August 28, 2018, it was announced that Epix had given the production, then titled Our Lady, LTD, a series order for a first season consisting of ten episodes set to premiere in 2019. The series is written and showrun by Steven Conrad and Bruce Terris both of whom also executive produce alongside Todd Black, Jason Blumenthal, and Steve Tisch. Conrad directed six episodes of the series as well. The series is produced by MGM Television. On February 10, 2019, it was announced during the Television Critics Association's annual winter press tour that the series had been renamed Perpetual Grace, LTD.

=== Casting ===
Alongside the series order announcement, it was confirmed that Ben Kingsley would star in the series. On August 30, 2018, it was announced that Jimmi Simpson had been cast in a leading role. On September 4, 2018, it was reported that Jacki Weaver had been cast in a starring role. In November 2018, it was announced that Luis Guzmán, Damon Herriman, and Chris Conrad had been cast in series regular roles, that Kurtwood Smith and Terry O'Quinn would appear in a recurring capacity, and that Hana Mae Lee would appear in a guest role. On February 4, 2019, it was reported that Timothy Spall had been cast in a recurring role.

=== Filming ===
Principal photography for the series commenced in November 2018 in Santa Fe, New Mexico. Filming occurred in locations that month near Santa Fe including Los Cerrillos. In December 2018, shooting took place in Los Alamos with film sites including Los Alamos County Airport, Main Gate Park, Los Alamos National Bank, and DP Road. Filming was scheduled to last until March 2019.

=== Music ===
The original music for the series was created by The Jones Sisters, a band composed of series creator Steven Conrad, Guided by Voices' Bobby Bare Jr., Iron & Wine guitarist Jim Becker and The Autumn Defense bassist Brad Jones. The soundtrack was released on August 2, 2019, by Fat Possum Records. Alex Wurman composed the series' musical score.

== Reception ==
On Rotten Tomatoes, the first season has an approval rating of 88% with an average score of 9.5 out of 10 based on 16 reviews. The site's critical consensus is, "Singularly strange, Perpetual Grace, LTD boasts a brilliant cast (led by a hypnotic turn from Ben Kingsley), impressive panoramas, and no shortage of twisty delights."
