= The Promotion (film) =

- Promotional poster
- Directed by: Steven Conrad
- Written by: Steven Conrad
- Produced by: Jessika Borsiczky; Steven A. Jones
- Starring: Seann William Scott; John C. Reilly; Jenna Fischer; Lili Taylor; Fred Armisen; Gil Bellows
- Cinematography: Lawrence Sher
- Edited by: Myron Kerstein; Tim Streeto
- Music by: Alex Wurman
- Distributed by: Dimension Films; Third Rail Releasing
- Release date: June 6, 2008
- Country: United States
- Language: English
- Box office: $408,709

The Promotion is a 2008 American comedy film written and directed by Steven Conrad. The film stars Seann William Scott, John C. Reilly, Jenna Fischer, Lili Taylor, Fred Armisen, and Gil Bellows. A look at the quest for the American Dream, it focuses on two grocery store managers vying for a promotion.

The film premiered at South by Southwest in March 2008. Dimension Films and Third Rail Releasing released it on June 6, 2008.

== Plot ==
Doug Stauber is the assistant manager of a branch of Donaldson's, a supermarket chain in Chicago. He believes that he is a shoo-in for manager of a Donaldson's that is scheduled for construction just a few blocks away from his home. Every day, Doug deals with the pressures of being the assistant manager. Among his ordeals are an unruly gang of teenagers loitering around the parking lot, the overwhelming amount of negative comments on the customer survey cards he collects (nearly all of which concern the gang's antics), a foreigner who constantly slaps him over a box of Teddy Grahams, and the rumors about him being a former Junior Olympics medalist in gymnastics. Then one day, Richard Wehlner and his family move in from Quebec, and he becomes assistant manager alongside Doug.

Since Richard's arrival, it appears that he has replaced Doug as front-runner for the job. But it soon becomes clear that Richard has disadvantages of his own, such as a past substance abuse problem and a tendency to make inappropriate remarks. In one incident, both men are challenged by the board of directors over a sign posted on the deli section window, citing the deli clerk as Employee of the Month for "cutting the cheese". Richard admits being manager on duty when the sign was discovered, and explains that he had not realized that the phrase is derogatory to the American public (claiming that "cracking the cheese" is what Canadians say). The competition between Doug and Richard causes strain on their respective marriages. Doug is under financial pressure to get the job because he has begun to buy a house that he cannot afford if he is not promoted, while his wife ponders going to night school. Meanwhile, Richard's wife Laurie and daughter leave him to temporarily move to her parents' home in Scotland when she sees he is losing control and reverting to his previous behavioral problems.

One day, while helping a customer in the parking lot, Doug is hit on the back of the head by a bottle of Yoo-hoo thrown by one of the gang members. In retaliation, he confronts the gang and sprays one of them with mace. Further worsening the situation is an incident in the break room, where a furious Doug throws some frozen Tater Tots toward the trash can and accidentally hits Richard's hand with one; Richard fakes an injury by wearing a wrist brace at work. Days later, Doug gives an apology speech at a local community center explaining his actions during the mace incident and wins the respect of the community, assuring them that a beautiful day should not be spoiled by a few "bad apples". After the meeting, the board of directors, the assistant managers and the community leaders have a brief meeting, wherein Richard inadvertently refers to the gang as "black apples", infuriating the head community leader.

After several attempts to eliminate each other as competitors, both Doug and Richard, along with another prospect, are summoned by the board of directors for a final interview. Richard's hopes are shattered when it is revealed that a drug test is required, as he has recently smoked marijuana. Shortly after the interview, Doug is given a call by Mitch and notified that he has landed the job, as Richard failed his drug test and the other candidate is too junior-grade for the position. He celebrates by doing cartwheels and backflips while crossing the street – finally confirming the earlier rumor about himself. Meanwhile, after reuniting with his wife, Richard and his family return to Quebec to his old grocery store, where he is reported to have become the store manager after singlehandedly stopping an accidental fire (which is rumored to have been started by Richard himself).

== Cast ==
- Seann William Scott as Doug Stauber, a 33-year-old assistant manager of a Donaldson's supermarket fighting to earn a managerial position at an upcoming branch.
- John C. Reilly as Richard Wehlner, a Canadian who moves to Chicago with his family and becomes Doug's co-assistant manager.
- Gil Bellows as Mitch, leader of the Donaldson's board of directors.
- Fred Armisen as Scott Fargus, manager of the Donaldson's where Doug and Richard work.
- Jenna Fischer as Jen Stauber, Doug's wife who works as a nurse assisting Dr. Timm.
- Bobby Cannavale as Dr. Timm, a pediatric surgeon and Jen's boss who always forgets Doug's name.
- Lili Taylor as Laurie Wehlner, Richard's Scottish wife.
- Rick Gonzalez as Ernesto, an employee at the supermarket.
- Chris Conrad as "Teddy Grahams", a painter who speaks in a foreign language and frequently slaps Doug because of an issue with buying boxes of graham cracker snacks.
- Jason Bateman as the Camp Instructor, who leads the Donaldson's employees' motivational retreat.
- Adrian Martinez as Octavio.

The film features cameo appearances by Masi Oka and Chris Gardner. Richard Henzel provides the voice in Richard Wehlner's motivational tapes.

== Production notes ==
The film was shot on location in Chicago, Illinois, during the summer of 2006. It originally was slated for release in May 2007, but new scenes were added which included Masi Oka of Heroes as a real estate loan officer.

== Soundtrack ==
The film's soundtrack consists mainly of 1970s classic rock songs played through Richard's motivational tapes, as well as 1980s and 1990s Indie rock songs which reflect Doug's life.

Featured songs

1. "Born to Move" by Creedence Clearwater Revival
2. "Harness and Wheel" by The Kingsbury Manx
3. "Fly Like an Eagle" by the Steve Miller Band
4. "Rise" by Public Image Ltd.
5. "Don't Be Scared" by Andrew Bird
6. "Time for Me to Fly" by REO Speedwagon
7. "Maneater" by Clair Marlo & Her Orchestra
8. "Turn It On" by The Flaming Lips

== Critical reception ==
The review aggregator Rotten Tomatoes reports that 54% of critics gave the film positive reviews based on 76 reviews; the average rating is 5.9/10. The consensus is, "With a workplace-related theme worthy of satire, The Promotion features some sharp witticisms but ultimately disappoints." Metacritic reports the film has an average score of 51 out of 100, based on 21 reviews.

Michael Phillips of the Chicago Tribune gave the film 2 1/2 stars out of four, saying it "may not be much, and you get to know that supermarket uncomfortably well by the end of the 85 minutes. But as I say: [Steven Conrad is] an interesting writer." James Berardinelli gave the film three out of 4 stars, saying, "What makes this film worthwhile is its willingness to display the protagonists as decent human beings despite their dog-eat-dog circumstances. There are enough laughs to justify it being labeled as a comedy but a stronger storyline than one normally associates with this kind of film." Roger Ebert gave the film two out of four stars, calling it "one of those off-balance movies that seems searching for the right tone." John Anderson of The Washington Post wrote an unfavorable review of the film, saying, "The portrayal of employment in America is too close for comfort. Or comedy... Not the stuff of lighthearted summer comedy."
