= The Patchwork Hero =

Australian television series

- Created by: Michael Noonan
- Based on: The Patchwork Hero
- Screenplay by: Michael Noonan
- Directed by: Chris Thomson; Noel Price; Mark Callen
- Starring: Steve Bisley; Damon Herriman
- Country of origin: Australia
- Original language: English
- No. of seasons: 1
- No. of episodes: 6

Production
- Producers: Chris Thomson; Noel Price
- Cinematography: Chris Davis
- Running time: 30 minutes

Original release
- Network: ABC
- Release: 3 March – 7 April 1981

The Patchwork Hero is an Australian television series that aired on ABC in 1981. First shown in a children's time slot it was repeated later in the year in a family slot. It starred Steve Bisley and Damon Herriman. The series won a Sammy Award for Best children's series.

== Synopsis ==
Hardy idolises his sea captain father. Over time he comes to realise he is human.

== Cast ==
- Steve Bisley as Barney Jamieson
- Damon Herriman as Hardy Jamieson
- Monica Maughan as Aunt Victoria
- Kirsty Child as Aunt Ivy
- Jackie Woodburne as Marie
- Simon Austin as Calendar McKenzie
- Richard McFarlane
- Harry Kinsella

== Production ==
The series was an adaptation of Michael Noonan's novel The Patchwork Hero created by the ABC Children's Drama Unit in November 1980. It was filmed on Victoria's Mornington Peninsula.
