= Terry O'Quinn =

American actor (born 1952)

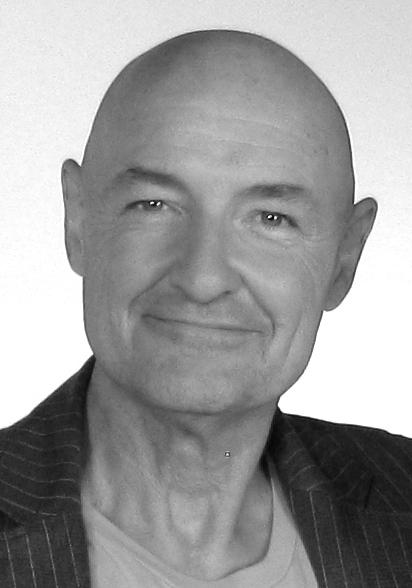
- O'Quinn in 2008
- Born: Terrance Quinn; July 15, 1952 (age 74); Sault Ste. Marie, Michigan, U.S.
- Occupation: Actor
- Years active: 1975–present
- Spouse: Lori O'Quinn (m. 1979; div. 2010)
- Children: 2

Terrance Quinn (born July 15, 1952), known professionally as Terry O'Quinn, is an American actor. He won a Primetime Emmy Award for his performance as John Locke on the TV series Lost (2004–2010). In film, he also played the title role in The Stepfather (1987) and Howard Hughes in The Rocketeer (1991) with roles in other films such as Heaven's Gate (1980), Silver Bullet (1985), Young Guns (1988), Blind Fury (1989), Tombstone (1993) and Primal Fear (1996).

Other prominent television roles include Peter Watts in Millennium (1996–1999), FBI Asst. Director Kendall in Alias (2002–2004), Commander Joe White in Hawaii Five-0 (2011–2018), and Tom Tavner in Patriot (2015–2018).

== Early life ==
O'Quinn was born at War Memorial Hospital in Sault Ste. Marie, Michigan, one of 11 siblings, and grew up in nearby Newberry, Michigan. He is of Irish descent and was raised Catholic. He attended Central Michigan University in Mount Pleasant, Michigan, and the University of Iowa in Iowa City. He changed his surname from Quinn to O'Quinn as another registered actor already had the name Terrance Quinn.

In the 1970s, O'Quinn went to Baltimore to act in the Center Stage production of Tartuffe. He remained at Center Stage for several years and often appeared with the late Tana Hicken, most notably as Benedick to her Beatrice in Much Ado About Nothing. His first movie role was in Heaven's Gate.

== Career ==
O'Quinn began acting in the 1970s during his time at Central Michigan University. He not only was an actor but also playwright/director. He wrote and directed the musical Orchestrina. This musical featured five main characters: The Man (played by Jeff Daniels), The Boy (Harold Downs), The Woman (Ann O'Donnell), The Girl (Debbie Penwarden), and The Drunk (James Hilliker), plus a female and a male chorus. He was roommates at CMU with actor Brad Slaight.

Starting in 1980, O'Quinn has appeared in various feature films such as Silver Bullet, Tombstone, Heaven's Gate, Young Guns, Ghosts of Mississippi, with Rutger Hauer in Blind Fury, and as Howard Hughes in The Rocketeer.

O'Quinn also appeared in the Canadian horror movie, Pin (1988) alongside British-born Canadian actor, David Hewlett.

His early television roles include guest appearances on Tales of the Unexpected (episode "In the Bag"), Miami Vice (episode "Give a Little, Take a Little"), Moonlighting, Star Trek: The Next Generation (episode "The Pegasus"), The Twilight Zone (1985 revival; episode "Chameleon"), Homicide: Life on the Street (episode "Hate Crimes"), a recurring role on Earth 2, another recurring role as Captain (later Rear Admiral) Thomas Boone on JAG, as well as Colonel Will Ryan in episode 15 of season 1 on the JAG spin-off series NCIS (episode "Enigma").

Around 1995, O'Quinn made guest appearances in The X-Files and Harsh Realm, produced by Chris Carter, who also cast him in the film The X-Files: Fight the Future and then once again in the final season. In 1996, O'Quinn started acting as Peter Watts in the television series Millennium, also produced by Chris Carter. O'Quinn held this role for all three seasons of the series. O'Quinn holds the distinction of having played four different characters within the extended X-Files/Millennium continuum (the two shows being classed together since both Lance Henriksen's character of Frank Black and Charles Nelson Reilly's character of Jose Chung have appeared in both shows).

=== The Stepfather films ===
O'Quinn made his breakthrough by starring as the title character in The Stepfather, a deranged serial killer going by the name "Jerry Blake" (his character's real name and identity are never revealed), who is obsessed with having an ideal family. When a widowed mother and daughter do not comply with his expectations, he spirals into a spell of madness and attempts to murder them. O'Quinn was praised by critics, including Roger Ebert in the Chicago Sun-Times, who commented, "The Stepfather has one wonderful element: Terry O'Quinn's performance." Ebert wrote, "He is a journeyman actor from TV and many movies, usually in supporting roles and you may or may not recognize him. What's clear at once is that he is a strong actor and given this leading role he brings all kinds of creepy dimensions to it. He has the thankless assignment of showing us a completely hateful, repellent character – and he approaches the task as an exercise in cloying middle-class good manners." O'Quinn was nominated for both a Saturn Award and an Independent Spirit Award for his performance. A sequel, Stepfather II, was released two years later, in which his character escapes from an insane asylum. It grossed almost a million dollars less at the box office. Not impressed with the second movie, O'Quinn declined to appear in its third installment, in which the stepfather character was portrayed by Robert Wightman.

O'Quinn was approached by the director of the 2009 reboot of The Stepfather, Nelson McCormick, to make a cameo appearance in the film but according to the producers O'Quinn turned down the offer.

=== Lost ===
After a string of recurring appearances on Alias (2002–2003), as the FBI Director Kendall, O'Quinn became a favorite of television producer J. J. Abrams. Following a seven-episode guest run on The West Wing in 2003–2004, O'Quinn received a call from Abrams indicating that the producer wanted to cast him in his new television drama Lost without any audition. In 2005, O'Quinn received an Emmy nomination for Best Supporting Actor in a Drama for his work as John Locke on the series Lost. O'Quinn admitted on the TV Guide Channel that he did not have much faith in Lost at first, calling it "The Mysterious Gilligan's Island of Dr. Moreau". The show, however, became one of the most popular on television, and on September 16, 2007, he won an Emmy Award for Outstanding Supporting Actor in a Drama Series for his role, and was nominated again for an Emmy for the role in 2010, which he did not win. In a TV.com interview O'Quinn commented that the reason he felt comfortable playing this character is because he's a bit like him.

=== 2010–present ===
O'Quinn has made a number of television appearances since Lost. From 2012 to 2013, O'Quinn starred in the short-lived series 666 Park Avenue as Gavin Doran. In 2012, he appeared in the second season of Falling Skies. Additionally, O’Quinn starred for two seasons in Amazon Studios' Patriot.

In 2016, it was announced that O'Quinn would be joining the second season of Secrets and Lies. In 2019, O'Quinn starred in the only season of Perpetual Grace, LTD on Epix.

In February 2021, it was announced that O'Quinn was cast as Martin Queller in the Netflix thriller series Pieces of Her, which is adapted from the Karin Slaughter novel of the same name.

In October 2023, during New York Comic Con, it was announced that he would play the antagonist Major General Beale in The Walking Dead: The Ones Who Live, created by Scott M. Gimple.

Terry joined the Cameo platform shortly after its launch in 2017, creating videos for fans and donating all of the proceeds to the Virginia Beach Society for the Prevention of Cruelty to Animals.

In 2026, O'Quinn made his video game acting debut in Silent Hill: Townfall.

== Filmography ==
=== Film ===
Year	Title	Role	Notes
1980	Heaven's Gate	Capt. Minardi	
1983	All the Right Moves	Freeman Smith	
1983	Without a Trace	Parent	
1984	Places in the Heart	Buddy Kelsey	
1984	Mrs. Soffel	Detective Buck McGovern	
1985	Silver Bullet	Sheriff Joe Haller	
1985	Mischief	Claude Harbrough	
1986	SpaceCamp	Launch Director	
1987	The Stepfather	Jerry Blake / Henry Morrison / Bill Hodgkins / The Stepfather	Nominated—Independent Spirit Award for Best Male Lead; Nominated—National Society of Film Critics Award for Best Actor; Nominated—Saturn Award for Best Actor
1987	Black Widow	Bruce	
1988	Young Guns	Alex McSween	
1988	Pin	Dr. Linden	
1989	Blind Fury	Frank Deveraux	
1989	Stepfather II	Jerry Blake / Dr. Gene Clifford / The Stepfather	
1989	The Forgotten One	Bob Anderson	
1990	Blood Oath	Major Beckett	
1991	The Rocketeer	Howard Hughes	
1991	Company Business	Colonel Pierce Grissom	
1992	The Cutting Edge	Jack Moseley	
1992	My Samurai	James McCrea	
1993	Tombstone	Mayor John Clum	
1993	Amityville: A New Generation	Detective Clark	Direct-to-video
1995	Shadow Warriors	Dr. Connors	
1996	Ghosts of Mississippi	Judge Hilburn	
1996	Primal Fear	Bud Yancy	
1997	Shadow Conspiracy	Frank Ridell	
1998	The X-Files	Darius Michaud	
2000	Rated X	J.R. Mitchell	
2001	American Outlaws	Rollin H. Parker	
2002	Hometown Legend	Buster Shuler	
2003	Old School	Goldberg	Uncredited
2016	New Life	Dr. Sumrall	
2024	Unsung Hero	Grandpa James	

=== Television ===
Year	Title	Role	Notes
1980	F.D.R.: The Last Year	James Roosevelt	Television
1981	The Doctors	Dr. Jerry Dancy	Soap opera
1982	Tales of the Unexpected	Policeman	Episode: "In the Bag" - Season 5 Episode 15
1983	Jacobo Timerman: Prisoner Without a Name, Cell Without a Number	Colonel Thomas Rhodes	Television film
1983	ABC Afterschool Special	Mr. Jacobs	Episode: "The Hand Me Down Kid"
1984	Miami Vice	Richard Cain	Episode: "Give a Little, Take a Little"
1985	The Twilight Zone	Dr. Curt Lockridge	Episode: "Chameleon"
1985	Right to Kill?	Jim Barrett	Television film
1985	An Early Frost	Dr. Redding	Television film
1985	Remington Steele	Chuck McBride	Episode: "Coffee, Tea or Steele"
1986	Between Two Women	Dr. Wallace	Television film
1986	Women of Valor	Major Tom Patterson	Television film
1987	Moonlighting	Bryant Wilbourne	Episode: "Take a Left At the Altar"
1987	At Mother's Request	Jeol Campbell	2 episodes
1987	When the Time Comes	Wes Travis	Television film
1988	Stranger on My Land	Connie Priest	Television film
1988	A Year in the Life	Keith	Episode: "Fathers and Other Strangers"
1989	Guts and Glory: The Rise and Fall of Oliver North	Aaron Sykes	2 episodes
1989	Roe vs. Wade	Jay Floyd	Television film
1990	Jake and the Fatman	Vincent Novak	Episode: "You're Driving Me Crazy"
1990	Perry Mason: The Case of the Desperate Deception	Curt Mitchell	Television film
1990	Kaleidoscope	Henry	Television film
1991	Son of the Morning Star	General Alfred Terry	2 episodes
1991	The Last to Go	Daniel	Television film
1991	Shoot First: A Cop's Vengeance	Sergeant Nicholas	Television film
1992	Deliver Them from Evil: The Taking of Alta View	Sergeant Don Bell	Television film
1992	Trial: The Price of Passion	Bob Altschuler	Television film
1992	L.A. Law	Nick Moats	Episode: "Beauty and the Breast"
1992	Sexual Advances	Cliff Ripley	Television film
1992	Wild Card	Barlow	Television film
1992	The Good Fight	Henry Cragin	Television film
1993	Born Too Soon	Dr. Friedman	Television film
1993	Visions of Murder	Admiral Truman Hager	Television film
1994	A Friend to Die For	Principal Ed Saxe	Television film
1994	MacShayne: Winner Takes All	Danny Legget	Television film
1994	Star Trek: The Next Generation	Admiral Erik Pressman	Episode: "The Pegasus"
1994	Heart of a Child	Gordon Holc	Television film
1994	Don't Talk to Strangers	Bonner	Television film
1994	Justice in a Small Town	Harris Wiley	Television film
1994	Tales from the Crypt	Inspector Martin Zeller	Episode: "The Bribe"
1994	Matlock	Malcolm Engle	Episode: "The Dare"
1994–1995	Earth 2	Reilly	6 episodes
1995	The X-Files	Lt. Brian Tillman	Episode: "Aubrey"
1995	Ray Alexander: A Menu for Murder	Frank Darnell	Television film
1995	The Client	Bert Halliwell	Episode: "Pilot"
1995	Homicide: Life on the Street	Bailey Lafeld	Episode: "Hate Crimes"
1995–2002	JAG	Capt./RAdm. Thomas Boone	10 episodes
1996	Diagnosis: Murder	Dr. Ronald Trent	Episode: "The Murder Trade"
1996–1999	Millennium	Peter Watts	41 episodes
1997	My Stepson, My Lover	Richard Cory	Television film
1997	On the Edge of Innocence	David Walker	Television film
1997	Breast Men	Hersch Lawyer	Television film
1999	Murder in a Small Town	Sidney Lassiter	Television film
1999–2000	Harsh Realm	General Omar Santiago	9 episodes
2001	Roswell	Carl	Episode: "Michael, the Guys, and the Great Snapple Caper"
2001	Semper Fi	Cliff's Father	Pilot
2001	WW3	Eric Farrell	Television film
2002	The X-Files	Shadow Man	Episode: "Trust No 1"
2002	The Locket	Casey Keddington	Television film
2002	First Monday	Sheriff Carl Richards	Episode: "Strip Search"
2002–2004	Alias	FBI Asst. Director Kendall	18 episodes
2003	Phenomenon II	Military Officer Jack Hatch	Television film
2003–2004	The West Wing	General Nicholas Alexander	7 episodes
2004	NCIS	Col. Will Ryan	Episode: "Enigma"
2004	Law & Order: Criminal Intent	Gordon Buchanan	Episode: "Mis-Labeled"
2004–2010	Lost	John Locke/The Man in Black	101 episodes Primetime Emmy Award for Outstanding Supporting Actor in a Drama Series; Saturn Award for Best Supporting Actor on Television; Screen Actors Guild Award for Outstanding Performance by an Ensemble in a Drama Series; Nominated—Golden Nymph Award for Outstanding Actor – Drama Series (2007, 2009–11); Nominated—Primetime Emmy Award for Outstanding Supporting Actor in a Drama Series (2005, 2010); Nominated—Saturn Award for Best Supporting Actor on Television (2006, 2008, 2011); Nominated—Teen Choice Award for Choice TV: Villain
2007	Masters of Science Fiction	Major Albert Skynner	Episode: "The Awakening"
2011	Taken from Me: The Tiffany Rubin Story	Mark Miller	Television film
2011	Hallelujah	Del Roman	Pilot
2011–2018	Hawaii Five-0	Commander Joe White	16 episodes
2012	Ring of Fire	Oliver Booth	2 episodes
2012–2013	Falling Skies	Arthur Manchester	3 episodes Nominated—Saturn Award for Best Guest Starring Role on Television
2012	666 Park Avenue	Gavin Doran	13 episodes
2014	Gang Related	Sam Chapel	12 episodes
2014	Phineas and Ferb	Professor Mystery (voice)	Episode: "Lost in Danville"
2015	The Adversaries	Charlie	Pilot
2015	Full Circle	Jimmy Parerra	6 episodes
2015–2018	Patriot	Tom Tavner	18 episodes
2016	Secrets and Lies	John Warner	7 episodes
2017	The Blacklist	Howard Hargrave	Episode: "Isabella Stone (No. 34)"; uncredited
2017	The Blacklist: Redemption	Howard Hargrave	7 episodes
2017	Mysteries of the Missing	Himself (host)	8 episodes
2018	Castle Rock	Dale Lacy	4 episodes
2019	Perpetual Grace, LTD	Texas Ranger Wesley Walker	10 episodes
2019	Emergence	Richard Kindred	5 episodes
2020–2022	FBI: Most Wanted	Byron LaCroix	9 episodes
2021–2025	Resident Alien	Peter Bach	13 episodes
2021	Ultra City Smiths	Captain Krieger (voice)	6 episodes
2021	Christmas Sail	Dennis	Television film
2022	Pieces of Her	Martin Queller	6 episodes
2024	The Walking Dead: The Ones Who Live	Johnathan Beale	3 episodes

=== Video games ===
Year	Title	Role	Notes
2026	Silent Hill: Townfall	Richard (voice)	
