= Unfinished Business (2015 film) =

2015 American comedy film by Ken Scott

- Theatrical release poster
- Directed by: Ken Scott
- Written by: Steven Conrad
- Produced by: Arnon Milchan; Todd Black; Jason Blumenthal; Steve Tisch; Anthony Katagas
- Starring: Vince Vaughn; Tom Wilkinson; Dave Franco; Sienna Miller; Nick Frost; James Marsden
- Cinematography: Oliver Stapleton
- Edited by: Michael Tronick; Jon Poll; Peter Teschner
- Music by: Alex Wurman
- Production companies: Regency Enterprises; Escape Artists; New Regency
- Distributed by: 20th Century Fox
- Release date: March 6, 2015
- Running time: 91 minutes
- Country: United States
- Language: English
- Budget: $35 million
- Box office: $14.4 million

Unfinished Business is a 2015 American comedy film directed by Ken Scott and written by Steven Conrad. The film stars Vince Vaughn, Tom Wilkinson, Dave Franco, Sienna Miller, Nick Frost, and James Marsden.

Dissatisfied Dan Trunkman, wanting to feel satisfied professionally, embarks with two colleagues to launch their own company, which they finally achieve after over a year of struggle.

Unfinished Business was produced by Regency Enterprises, Escape Artists and New Regency and released by 20th Century Fox on March 6, 2015. The film was panned by critics and was a box office bomb, only grossing $14.4 million on a budget of $35 million.

== Plot ==
Dan Trunkman decides to leave Dynamic Systems and start his own business in the metal swarf-selling field after a pay dispute with his boss, Charlene "Chuck" Portnoy. Tim McWinters, who was fired for being too old, and Mike Pancake, who was only there for an interview, follow Dan and join his new company.

A year later, Dan's business Apex Select has barely gotten off the ground. In their makeshift Dunkin' Donuts 'office', Dan gets a message to go on a business trip to Portland to meet with investors Jim Spinch and Bill Whilmsley.

Dan discovers that Chuck is also there trying to close a deal with the same company. She and Jim get along well, having worked together before, and seems as if she has been given the go ahead. Dan starts to give his presentation to Jim, only to faint in the middle of it. He tries to get Mike to finish, but everyone is distracted by Mike's last name.

Dan must scramble to get a step ahead of Chuck. He also starts to lose faith in the team, as the unhappily married Tim is more focused on making love, and Mike never attended college while possibly being autistic.

Dan is told to go to Berlin to meet with Jim's parent department Gelger, specifically with Dirk Austerlitz. The trio flies to Germany to speak with client Helen Harlmann, at a unisex sauna. She does not trust Dan, as he walked in fully-dressed in a suit. He undresses, so gets Helen to listen to him, with Mike and Tim joining them despite him telling them not to.

Mike finds a hotel for Tim and himself to stay at. Dan's room is actually an exhibit called "American Businessman 42" in a museum, where everyone watches him. He starts to put some numbers together to outdo Chuck. Tim procures ecstasy from one of the youths staying at the hotel.

Tim and Mike follow Bill, finding him in a gay nightclub during Folsom Europe Festival. Dan encounters Bill in a room with other men sticking their penises through glory holes. Later on, he explains this is the only way he can get any sort of pleasure. Bill takes a look at Dan's numbers and says they definitely trounce Chuck's. They also speak about how easy it is to get off-course in life.

The guys meet with Jim only to learn that Dirk is actually in St. Louis. He later tells Dan that, while his numbers are good, they are not good enough to close the deal. The trio spends time with some of the youth at the hotel, being honest and smoking.

After not smoking but listening to everyone, especially Mike, Dan goes out to buy "Straight Up Teal" eyeshadow for his son Paul. He speaks with his daughter, who reveals she beat up the other child defending Paul. He had been calling him names like "double stuff". Dan congratulates her but explains he will take care of Paul. Dan then speaks with Paul, doing his best to raise his spirits. He later finds himself depressed and drinking with strangers/admirers of "American Businessman 42".

Dan awakes the next morning hungover. Feeling inspired, he joins the marathon, ignoring an official's pleas for him to leave the race. Some of his "American Businessman 42" fans spot him and begin cheering him on with such enthusiasm it attracts the attention of a newscaster. He finishes the race, poignant as he had trained for the St. Louis marathon.

Dan later manages to score a meeting with Maarten Daaervk via Bill. First, the trio pass through a riot happening outside Daaervk's building. After evading police and getting pelted with paintballs, they manage to make it inside, thanks to Bill.

Daaervk likes what he hears from Dan, then what he sees on their front page, so they close a deal, thereby saving their business. He, Tim, and Mike celebrate, gloating in front of both Chuck and Jim.

Returning home to their respective loved ones: Mike rejoins his friends from the special home and boasts his multiple "explers" in Berlin. Tim reunites with the maid he encountered in Portland. Dan rejoins his family, now confident of their future.

== Cast ==
- Vince Vaughn as Daniel "Dan" Trunkman
- Tom Wilkinson as Timothy McWinters
- Dave Franco as Mike Pancake
- Sienna Miller as Charlene "Chuck" Portnoy
- June Diane Raphael as Susan Trunkman
- Ella Anderson as Bess Trunkman
- Britton Sear as Paul Trunkman
- James Marsden as Jim Spinch
- Nick Frost as Bill Whilmsley
- Uwe Ochsenknecht as Maarten Daaervk
- Michael Tow as Japanese Business Man

== Production ==
Filming began in mid-November 2013, in Boston, Massachusetts. In early October 2014, Vince Vaughn and Sienna Miller were back in Boston for re-shoots of the film, and both actors were photographed on the set.

== Release ==
=== Marketing ===
On November 26, 2014, 20th Century Fox released two trailers of the film. A restricted trailer and an edited trailer. The edited trailer was attached to screenings of Taken 3 and Mortdecai. On February 1, 2015, an advertisement for the film was released during Super Bowl XLIX that showed a montage of scenes set to the song "Like a Boss".

=== Home media ===
The film was released on DVD and Blu-ray on June 16, 2015.

== Reception ==
=== Box office ===
Unfinished Business was a box office bomb. The film grossed $10.2 million in North America and $4.2 million in other territories for a total gross of $14.4 million, failing to make back its budget of $35 million.

In its opening weekend, Unfinished Business grossed $4.8 million, finishing in 10th place at the box office. This was the lowest opening of Vince Vaughn's career, the previous unfortunate box office low being $7 million by 2013's Delivery Man.

=== Critical response ===
Unfinished Business has received mostly negative reviews. On Rotten Tomatoes the film has an approval rating of 10%, based on 100 reviews, with a rating average of 3.48/10. The site's critical consensus reads, "Unfocused and unfunny, Unfinished Business lives down to its title with a slipshod screenplay and poorly directed performances that would have been better left unreleased." On Metacritic the film has a weighted average score of 32 out of 100, based on reviews from 26 critics, indicating "generally unfavorable reviews". Audiences polled by CinemaScore gave the film a grade of "B−" on an A+ to F scale.

Justin Chang of Variety called it "A comedy with its heart in the right place and everything else bizarrely out of joint." James Berardinelli of ReelViews was critical of the film: "Unfinished Business is bad – not epically bad but bad enough. Little contained in this misfire of a film works and the few successful things are dragged out to the point where they die a lingering death". Joe Neumaier of the New York Daily News wrote: "Unfinished Business squanders almost every opportunity provided by its potentially funny premise. Instead, it becomes yet another blotch on star Vince Vaughn's résumé." Robbie Collin of The Daily Telegraph gave the film 1 star out of 5, and said "Mawkishness, gay panic, and lazy jokes make Vince Vaughn's workplace comedy considerably less fun than work itself."

Brad Wheeler of the Toronto Globe and Mail wrote: "Not without charm, Unfinished Business mixes the cute with the raunchy." Michael O'Sullivan of The Washington Post wrote: "While by no means a masterpiece, the comedy, by Canadian director Ken Scott, is a careful calibration of crass gags and genuine sentiment that succeeds more often than it fails."
