= Michael Chernus =

American actor (born 1977)

- Chernus in 2026
- Born: Michael Louis Chernus; August 8, 1977 (age 49); Rocky River, Ohio, U.S.
- Education: Juilliard School (BFA)
- Occupation: Actor
- Years active: 2003–present
- Children: 1

Michael Louis Chernus (born August 8, 1977) is an American film, television, and stage actor. Best known for his role as Cal Chapman on the comedy-drama series Orange Is the New Black (2013–2019), he has also had roles in the superhero film Spider-Man: Homecoming (2017) and the science-fiction thriller series Severance (2022–present). In 2023, Chernus starred in the thriller miniseries Dead Ringers, which won a Peabody Award.

== Life and career ==
Chernus was born in Rocky River, Ohio. He is a graduate of the Juilliard School's Drama Division. An accomplished stage actor, Chernus won a 2011 Obie Award and received a Lucille Lortel Award nomination for his performance in Lisa Kron's In the Wake at The Public Theater in New York City. On stage, he co-starred with David Hyde Pierce in the Manhattan Theater Club production of Close Up Space at New York City Center. Other New York credits include such theaters as Playwrights Horizons, the Roundabout Theatre Company, Primary Stages, New York Theatre Workshop, Atlantic Theater Company, and many productions at the Rattlestick Playwrights Theater, where he played the lead role of KJ in Annie Baker's play The Aliens, which Charles Isherwood of The New York Times named the best play of 2010.

He appeared in Second Stage Theatre's 2014 production of Lips Together, Teeth Apart, co-starring America Ferrera. Chernus has acted in films such as Men in Black 3, Captain Phillips, The Bourne Legacy, and Jack & Diane. His most notable role to date is Cal Chapman, protagonist Piper Chapman's brother, in the Netflix original comedy-drama series Orange Is the New Black. Chernus starred as Tom in the Peabody Award-winning miniseries Dead Ringers, which premiered on Amazon Prime Video in 2023.

He was cast as John Wayne Gacy in the Peacock series Devil in Disguise: John Wayne Gacy. The series debuted in October 2025.

== Filmography ==
=== Film ===
Year	Title	Role	Notes	Ref.
2005	Winter Passing	Ben		
2007	Lovely by Surprise	Humpkin		
2008	High Street Plumbing	Kirby	Short film	
2009	The Messenger	Alan		
2009	The Rebound	Actor #3		
2009	Feed the Fish	JP		
2010	Nonames	Danny		
2010	Coach	Michael		
2010	Love & Other Drugs	Jerry		
2011	Split	Chris	Short film	
2011	Higher Ground	Ned		
2011	The Handel-Halvorsen Passacaglia	The Man		
2012	Jack & Diane	Jaimie		
2012	Men in Black 3	Jeffrey Price		
2012	The Bourne Legacy	Arthur Ingram		
2013	He's Way More Famous Than You	Himself		
2013	The Mouseketeer		Short film	
2013	Mutual Friends	Chernus		
2013	Captain Phillips	Shane Murphy		
2014	Goodbye to All That	Freddie		
2014	Alex of Venice	Trofimov		
2014	Glass Chin	Brian Colby		
2014	The Rub	Henry	Short film	
2015	Mistress America	Dylan		
2015	People Places Things	Gary		
2015	Aloha	Roy		
2015	The Family Fang	Kenny		
2016	Complete Unknown	Clyde		
2017	The Dinner	Dylan Heinz		
2017	The Most Hated Woman in America	Jon Garth Murray		
2017	The Meyerowitz Stories	Male Nurse		
2017	Spider-Man: Homecoming	Phineas Mason / Tinkerer		
2018	The Kindergarten Teacher	Grant Spinelli		
2018	Furlough	Bus Driver		
2020	Materna	David		
2021	Werewolves Within	Pete		
2023	Molli and Max in the Future	Turboschmuck		
2024	Out of My Mind	Mr. Dimming		
2024	A Complete Unknown	Theodore Bikel		
2025	Köln 75	Michael "Mick" Watts		
2026	Evil Genius	Ken Barnes		
2026	A Statement	Tom McPherson		
2026	Ray Gunn	Sam Stelfreeze (voice)		

=== Television ===
Year	Title	Role	Notes	Ref.
2009	Bored to Death	Francis Hamm	Episode: "Take a Dive"	
2009–2010	Mercy	Ryan Flanagan	Recurring role, 9 episodes	
2011	Damages	New Jersey Bar Owner	2 episodes	
2011	Law & Order: Special Victims Unit	Jay Delaney	Episode: "Educated Guess"	
2012	The Big C	Pastor Rick	4 episodes	
2012	The New Normal	Paul	Episode: "Nangasm"	
2013	Nurse Jackie	Louie	Episode: "Walk of Shame"	
2013–2019	Orange Is the New Black	Cal Chapman	Recurring role, 17 episodes	
2013	Royal Pains	Pat McRevis	Episode: "Can of Worms"	
2013	Nashville	Howie V	Episode: "They Don't Make 'Em Like My Daddy Anymore"	
2014	Elementary	Edwin Borstein	Episode: "Bella"	
2014–2015	Manhattan	Louis "Fritz" Fedowitz	Main role, 22 episodes	
2015	Law & Order: Special Victims Unit	Tommy Sullivan	Episode: "Parole Violations"	
2015–2018	Patriot	Congressman Edward Tavner	Main role, 18 episodes	
2015	The Good Wife	Spencer Harman	Episode: "Discovery"	
2016–2019	Easy	Kyle	6 episodes	
2017	Wormwood	Mal	3 episodes	
2019–2020	Ramy	Michael	3 episodes	
2019	Perpetual Grace, LTD	Everly Pirdoo	5 episodes	
2020	Tommy	Ken Rosey	Main role, 12 episodes	
2020	Monsterland	Tommy	Episode: "Newark, New Jersey"	
2021	Prodigal Son	Jerry	2 episodes	
2021	Cinema Toast	Man (voice)	Episode: "Attack of the Karens"	
2022	Evil	Dr. Paul Wimsimer	Episode: "The Demon of Cults"	
2022	Little America	Paul	Episode: "Columbus Starlings LLC"	
2022–present	Severance	Dr. Ricken Lazlo Hale	Main role	
2023	Dead Ringers	Tom	Miniseries	
2023	Carol & the End of The World	Eric (voice)	3 episodes	
2025	Devil in Disguise: John Wayne Gacy	John Wayne Gacy	Main role, 8 episodes	

=== Stage ===
Year	Play	Role	Theatre	Notes	Ref.
2003	Jump/Cut	Dave	Woolly Mammoth Theatre Company, Regional		
2004	Romeo and Juliet	Benvolio	Guthrie Theater, Regional		
2004	Finer Noble Gases	Lynch	Rattlestick Playwrights Theater, Off-Broadway		
2004–2005	A Number	Bernard/Bernard/Michael	New York Theatre Workshop, Off-Broadway	Understudy	
2005	Create Fate	Nathan	Williamstown Theatre Festival, Regional		
2005–2006	Mr. Marmalade	George/Cactus/Bob	Laura Pels Theatre, Off-Broadway		
2006	The Mistakes Madeline Made	Wilson	Yale Repertory Theatre, Regional		
2007	Essential Self-Defense	Isaak Glinka	Playwrights Horizons, Off-Broadway		
2007	American Sligo	Kyle	Rattlestick Playwrights Theater, Off-Broadway		
2007	Rag and Bone	George	Rattlestick Playwrights Theater, Off-Broadway		
2008	Hunting and Gathering	Astor	59E59 Theaters, Off-Broadway		
2010	The Aliens	KJ	Rattlestick Playwrights Theater, Off-Broadway		
2010	In the Wake	Danny	The Public Theater, Off-Broadway		
2011	Touch(ed)	Billy	Williamstown Theatre Festival, Regional		
2011–2012	Close Up Space	Steve	Manhattan Theatre Club, Off-Broadway		
2014	Lips Together, Teeth Apart	Sam Truman	Second Stage Theater, Off-Broadway		
2017	Sacred Valley	Narby	Powerhouse Theater		
2025	Well, I'll Let You Go	Bubba Weiler	Irondale Center, Off-Broadway		

== Awards and nominations ==
Year	Award	Category	Nominated work	Result	Ref.
2011	Lucille Lortel Awards	Outstanding Featured Actor in a Play	In the Wake	Nominated	
2011	Obie Awards	Outstanding Performance by a Featured Actor	In the Wake	Won	
2023	Actor Awards	Outstanding Performance by an Ensemble in a Drama Series	Severance	Nominated	
2026	Critics' Choice Television Awards	Best Actor in a Limited Series or Movie Made for Television	Devil in Disguise: John Wayne Gacy	Nominated	
2026	Actor Awards	Outstanding Performance by an Ensemble in a Drama Series	Severance	Nominated	
