= Star Command (film) =

- Also known as: In the Fold
- Genre: Action; Adventure; Sci-Fi
- Directed by: E.W. Swackhamer, Jim Johnston
- Starring: Jay Underwood; Jennifer Bransford; Chris Conrad
- Theme music composer: Lee Holdridge
- Countries of origin: United States; Germany
- Original language: English

Production
- Executive producer: Melinda M. Snodgrass
- Producers: Artie Mandelberg; Hans-Erich Busch
- Production location: Berlin
- Cinematography: Achim Poulheim
- Editor: Edgar Burcksen
- Running time: 97 min.
- Production companies: High Command Productions; Paramount Television; UFA Babelsberg GmbH; Wilshire Court Productions

Original release
- Network: UPN
- Release: March 11, 1996

Star Command (secondary title In the Fold) is a 1996 television film written by Melinda M. Snodgrass and directed by Jim Johnston, which was originally intended as a television pilot produced by Paramount Television for UPN.

== Premise ==
At an unspecified point several centuries in the future, a unified Earth (known as the 'Democratic Republic of Earth') is exploring and colonizing the galaxy. One of its earliest colonies, the planet Cynosura, has declared independence and is attempting to establish its own sphere of influence as Earth's rival. The already tense situation escalates after Earth discovers and claims an ideally habitable world named Meraz. After negotiations over joint access to Meraz break down, the Cynosurans decide to seize the planet by force. Meraz is undefended, as the Cynosurans have made it clear that they would consider the stationing of an armed garrison there tantamount to a declaration of war.

At the orbital headquarters of Earth's Star Corps, a class of graduating cadets is assigned their new postings. Six of the new ensigns: Oort, Fujisaki, Vallas, McGinty, Dundee, and Jackson are assigned a training cruise on the corvette Surprise, in the company of only two experienced officers, Captain Ridnoer and first officer Ivorstetter.

The Surprise begins its patrol, which includes a docking with an Earth carrier. Meanwhile, a Cynosuran task force of five heavy cruisers intercepts a mail ship headed for Meraz and tortures its pilot to death for information.

The Surprise jumps into the Meraz system and is almost immediately ambushed by the Cynosuran task force. Vastly outgunned and with its FTL drive disabled, the corvette flees. After both of the ship's officers are lost in action, Ensign Oort assumes command. The trainees manage to fake their ship's crash on the moon of a gas giant, and the Cynosurans resume their cautious approach to Meraz.

On the ice moon, the trainees debate their course of action. Since the Cynosurans are obviously planning to exterminate the 25,000 Earth colonists on Meraz, they vote to relaunch the ship and do everything possible to prevent the attack. Ensign Jackson protests the decision as suicidal, and demands that the Surprise either lie low or surrender to the Cynosurans. He is outvoted, and the trainees begin repairing the ship. The disgruntled Jackson attempts to seize control of the ship, almost killing Fujisaki, Oort, and Dundee before McGinty and Vallas manage to turn the tables. Afterward the trainees carry out a makeshift court-martial, at which Jackson is sentenced to death by unanimous secret vote, but he commits suicide before the sentence can be carried out. The Surprise is launched and begins stalking the much slower Cynosuran task force.

Their first attack involves towing a swarm of asteroids into the path of the unsuspecting Cynosuran cruisers, one of which is destroyed. The Surprise next tries to lay an ambush by concealing itself in a cometary coma, only to have the enemy coincidentally attempt the same thing. A surprise attack from behind causes the Cynosuran cruisers Hornet and Strike to collide and explode. Next, the Surprise crew manage to spoof the sensors of the remaining two enemy ships while in close proximity to the rings of a Saturn-like gas giant, destroying the cruiser Apocalypse. At this point, out of tricks and ammunition, the Surprise positions itself above Meraz, even though a one-on-one confrontation with the last remaining cruiser is expected to be hopeless. In a fierce battle, the cruiser takes damage, but the Surprise is crippled. As the Cynosuran captain prepares to administer a coup de grace, his missile is intercepted by a newly arrived Earth fleet, causing the enemy to withdraw.

== Main cast ==
- Jay Underwood .... Ens. Kenneth 'Ken' Oort
- Jennifer Bransford .... Ens. Ali McGinty
- Chris Conrad .... Ens. Tully Vallis
- Tembi Locke .... Ens. Meg Dundee
- Kelly Hu .... Ens. Yukiko Fujisaki
- Ivan Sergei .... Ens. Phillip Jackson
- Eva Habermann .... Ens. Johanna Pressler
- Morgan Fairchild .... Cmdr. Sigrid Ívarsdóttir
- Chad Everett .... Capt. Shane Ridnaur

== See also ==
- List of television films produced for UPN
