= The Weather Man =

2005 film by Gore Verbinski

- Theatrical release poster
- Directed by: Gore Verbinski
- Written by: Steve Conrad
- Produced by: Todd Black; Jason Blumenthal; Steve Tisch
- Starring: Nicolas Cage; Michael Caine; Hope Davis; Michael Rispoli; Gil Bellows
- Cinematography: Phedon Papamichael
- Edited by: Craig Wood
- Music by: Hans Zimmer
- Production company: Escape Artists
- Distributed by: Paramount Pictures
- Release dates: October 20, 2005 (Chicago International Film Festival); October 28, 2005 (United States)
- Running time: 102 minutes
- Country: United States
- Language: English
- Budget: $22 million
- Box office: $19 million

The Weather Man is a 2005 American dark comedy-drama film directed by Gore Verbinski, written by Steve Conrad, and starring Nicolas Cage as a Chicago-area weatherman who is in a midst of a mid-life crisis even as his career is potentially about to take off with a new job on a national television morning show. The film also stars Michael Caine and Hope Davis in supporting roles. The film was released on October 28, 2005, and grossed $19 million worldwide. It received mixed to positive reviews upon release.

== Plot ==
David Spritz, a successful weatherman at a Chicago news program, is well paid but garners little respect from people in the area who throw fast food at him, he suspects, because they're resentful of how easy his high-paying job is. Dave also feels overshadowed by his father, Pulitzer Prize-winning author Robert Spritzel, who is disappointed in Dave's apparent inability to grow up and deal with his two children. The situation worsens when Robert is diagnosed with lymphoma and given only a few months to live. As he becomes more and more depressed, Dave takes up archery, finding the activity a way to build his focus and calm his nerves.

David later remembers a conversation between himself and his father, where his father explains to him that "the harder thing to do and the right thing to do are often the same thing" and that "nothing that has meaning is easy". David appreciates this advice but struggles to implement it.

To prove himself to his father and possibly reconcile with Noreen, his estranged wife, Dave pursues a weatherman position with a national talk show called Hello America. The job would nearly quadruple his salary, but means relocating to New York City. When Hello America invites him to New York, he takes his daughter, Shelly, with him and bonds with her by helping her shop for a more suitable wardrobe. While away, Dave learns that his son Mike attacked his counselor, Don Bowden, claiming that the man wanted to perform oral sex on him. Despite this stress and an all-night drinking binge, Dave impresses the Hello America interviewers and is eventually offered the job.

When he returns, Dave slaps Russ, Noreen's boyfriend, when he finds him dealing with his son's predicament. Dave later confronts the counselor at his home, beating him up and warning him that he is in store for worse.

The family holds a living funeral for Robert organised by Dave's mother, Lauren, in which Dave asks Noreen to reconcile and move to New York, but she has decided to marry Russ. Dave and Robert have one final talk, in which Dave breaks down in tears, unsure of his life's choices. Robert consoles him, telling him that he has time to "chuck" the garbage of his life. Robert dies soon after.

The film ends several months later, after Dave has accepted the job and moved to New York. People have ceased throwing things at him though, he muses, this may be a pleasant side-effect of his archery hobby, for which he carries a bow.

== Cast ==
- Nicolas Cage as Dave Spritz (real name David Spritzel)
- Michael Caine as Robert Spritzel
- Hope Davis as Noreen Spritzel
- Nicholas Hoult as Mike Spritzel
- Gemmenne de la Peña as Shelly Spritzel
- Michael Rispoli as Russ
- Gil Bellows as Don Bowden
- Judith McConnell as Lauren Spritzel
- Tom Skilling as WGN Assistant Director

The film also includes cameos from media figures such as Bryant Gumbel, Ed McMahon, Cristina Ferrare, and Wolfgang Puck.

== Reception ==
The Weather Man received an overall score of 60% on Rotten Tomatoes and has an average rating of 6.1/10 based on 136 reviews. The site's consensus states: "With fine performances and a dark, dry sense of humor, The Weather Man is mostly cloudy with occasional rays of sunshine." It has a 61 out of 100 score on Metacritic, sampled from 37 critics, indicating "generally favorable reviews". Audiences polled by CinemaScore gave the film an average grade of "D+" on an A+ to F scale.

The film was released in North America on October 28, 2005, and ran for nearly eight weeks (precisely 54 days). It grossed $12.5 million in the U.S. and $6.6 million internationally, for a total of $19 million.
