= Truenorth (production company) =

Icelandic film and TV production company

Truenorth is an Icelandic film and TV production service company. It was founded in 2003 by Leifur B. Dagfinnsson and Árni Páll Hansson and has line produced feature films for studios such as Warner Bros., Paramount Pictures, Universal Pictures, Twentieth Century Fox, DreamWorks, Columbia (Sony), Marvel Studios and Netflix. The company has offered production service in Iceland for most notably: Batman Begins, black mirror, Die Another Day, Blade runner 2049, Prometheus, Stranger Things, Oblivion, Stardust, Noah, Captain America: Civil War, Thor: The Dark World, Transformers: The Last Knight, Star Wars: The Force Awakens, The Last Jedi and Rogue One.
