= Chris Conrad (actor) =

American actor

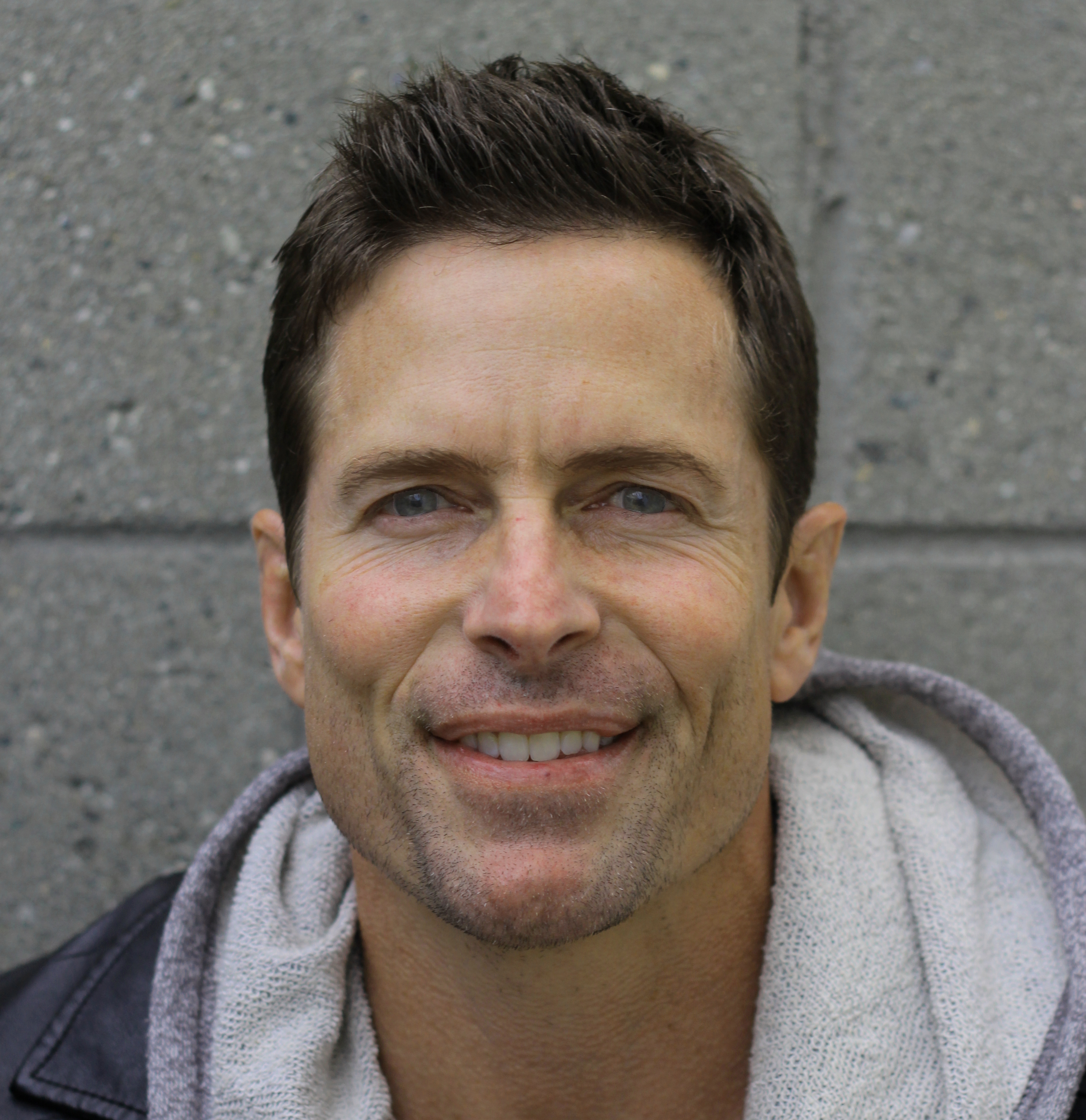
- Born: Fort Lauderdale, Florida, U.S.
- Education: Florida State University; Florida Atlantic University
- Years active: 1993–present
- Known for: Actor

Chris Conrad is an American actor. He is best known for his roles as Jason in Young Hercules, Dennis McClaren in Patriot, and Eric McGowen in The Next Karate Kid.

== Career ==
Conrad spent a year studying at the Piven Theatre Workshop, then signed with an agent and moved to Los Angeles with his brother Steven, who was in the process of selling the script for Wrestling Ernest Hemingway. His early movie roles were in Airborne and The Next Karate Kid. His breakout television role was in the 1998 series Young Hercules, in which he appeared in 37 episodes as Young Jason.

In 2000, Conrad returned home to Florida to finish college, he graduated from Florida Atlantic University with a bachelor's degree in history. He then taught high school and coached football but returned to Los Angeles in 2005 to pursue acting. He returned to television with a one-time appearances in Bones and Criminal Minds.

He has appeared in some of his brother's productions, including Patriot and Perpetual Grace, LTD.

Conrad originally was cast as Adrian Chase / Vigilante for the streaming series Peacemaker, the first DC Extended Universe television show. However, he left the series over creative differences after filming five-and-a-half episodes; director James Gunn recast the role with Freddie Stroma, reshooting or redubbing all of Conrad's scenes.

== Personal life ==
In his free time, Conrad trains in kickboxing, wrestling, and Brazilian jiu-jitsu; he holds a purple belt in Machado jiu-jitsu.

== Filmography ==
=== Film ===
Year	Title	Role	Notes
1993	Airborne	Jack	
1994	The Next Karate Kid	Eric McGowen	
1994	The Specialist	Officer	
1996	In the Fold	Ens. Tully Vallis	TV movie
1997	Sins of the Mind	Peter	TV movie
1997	Mortal Kombat Annihilation	Johnny Cage	
1998	Lovers and Liars	Eric	
1998	Young Hercules	Jason	
2008	The Promotion	Teddy Grahams	
2013	Atila	Vitto	
2013	3 Days in Havana	—N/a	executive producer
2016	Option Zero	Trevor	

=== Television ===
Year	Title	Role	Notes
1994	Rebel Highway	Jack	Episode: "Jailbreakers"
1995	JAG	Sergeant Lowell	Episode: "Big Break"
1998	Hercules: The Legendary Journeys	Young Jason	3 episodes
1998–1999	Young Hercules	Young Jason	37 episodes
2006	Bones	Agent	Episode: "Mother and Child in the Bay"
2006	Criminal Minds	Deputy Mack	Episode: "The Boogeyman"
2007	The Erotic Traveler	Edward	Episode: "Naked Pearls"
2007	Life	SWAT Cop	Episode: "The Fallen Woman"
2011	Connie Banks the Actor	Connie Banks	Unaired pilot
2015–2018	Patriot	Dennis McClaren	Main role
2019	Perpetual Grace, LTD	New Leaf	Main role
2022	Peacemaker	Adrian Chase / Vigilante	Opening credits and suit scenes only (season one)
2026	DTF St. Louis	Bob Dalt	2 episodes
