= Steven Conrad =

American filmmaker

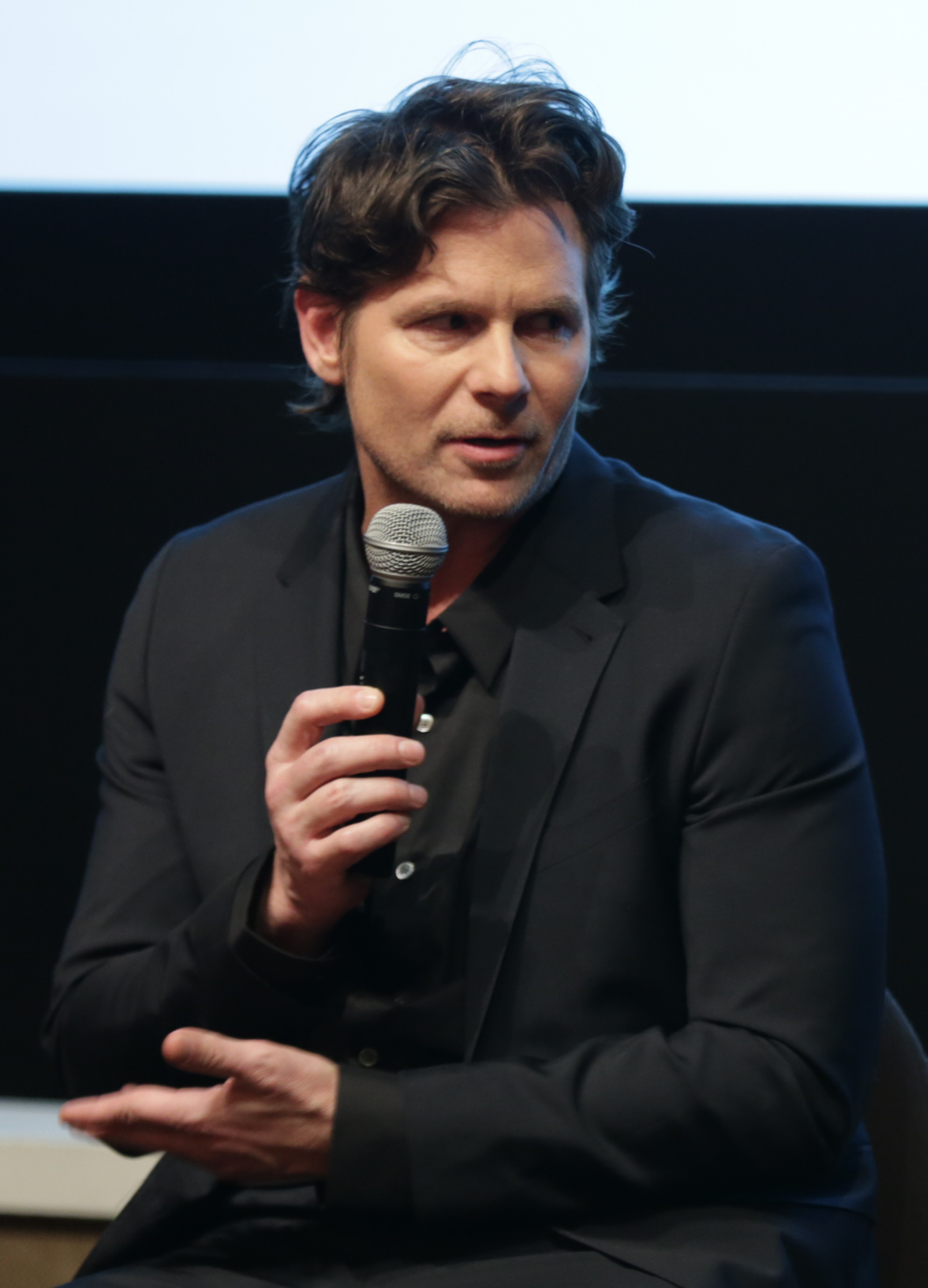
- Steve Conrad discusses Patriot for New America in 2017
- Born: Fort Lauderdale, Florida, U.S.
- Education: Florida State University; Northwestern University
- Occupations: Screenwriter, director, film producer
- Years active: 1986-present

Steven Conrad is an American screenwriter, director, and film producer.

== Early life and education ==
Steven Conrad was born in Fort Lauderdale, Florida.

He briefly attended Florida State University before transferring to Northwestern University, where he majored in creative writing.

== Career ==
Shortly after attending Northwestern, at age 19, he sold his first screenplay, Wrestling Ernest Hemingway, adapted from a short story he had written for a creative writing class. Eleven years passed before he tackled his next project, Lawrence Melm, which he wrote and directed. He followed this with The Weather Man (which he also produced) and The Pursuit of Happyness. He wrote, directed, and edited The Promotion, which premiered at South by Southwest in March 2008 and was released by Dimension Films later that year.

His projects include an adaptation of the Chang-Rae Lee novel Aloft for Scott Rudin; Chad Schmidt, about a talented actor with a resemblance to Brad Pitt and The Expanding Mailman with Jack Black.

In 2013, he adapted a James Thurber short story for the film The Secret Life of Walter Mitty, directed by and starring Ben Stiller. In 2015, Conrad developed Patriot for Amazon Studios. Its pilot led to a full series order, and it premiered in its entirety on February 24, 2017. In addition to executive-producing the series, he also wrote and directed most of the first season's episodes and all of the episodes of the second season.

In the same year, Conrad re-wrote the script for Wonder, a film adaptation of the 2012 novel of the same name by R. J. Palacio. The script was also written by Jack Thorne and Stephen Chbosky, with the latter having directed the film, which was released on November 17, 2017.

In 2019, Conrad's series Perpetual Grace, LTD, starring Ben Kingsley and featuring actors from Patriot, premiered on Epix. In 2021, Conrad's stop-motion animated series Ultra City Smiths premiered on AMC+.

In 2026, Conrad's black comedy miniseries DTF St. Louis premiered on HBO, starring Jason Bateman, David Harbour, and Linda Cardellini.

== Personal life ==
His brother, Chris Conrad, is an actor and has frequently appeared in Steven's productions. He was born to Bernice Conrad, a seventh-grade teacher at St. Gregory the Great Catholic School near Fort Lauderdale, FL, and Rex Conrad, a prominent trial attorney. He attended private Catholic school as a child.

== Filmography ==
=== Film ===
Year	Title	Credited as			Notes
Year	Title	Director	Writer	Producer	Notes
1993	Wrestling Ernest Hemingway	No	Yes	No	
2004	Lawrence Melm	Yes	Yes	No	Short film
2005	The Weather Man	No	Yes	Yes	
2006	The Pursuit of Happyness	No	Yes	No	
2008	The Promotion	Yes	Yes	No	Directorial debut
2013	The Secret Life of Walter Mitty	No	Yes	No	
2015	Unfinished Business	No	Yes	No	
2017	Wonder	No	Yes	No	

=== Television ===
Year	Title	Credited as			Notes
Year	Title	Director	Writer	Producer	Notes
2011	Connie Banks the Actor	Yes	Yes	No	Unaired pilot
2013	Timms Valley	Yes	Yes	No	Unaired pilot
2015–2018	Patriot	Yes	Yes	Yes	Creator; Writer (14 episodes), director (14 episodes)
2019	Perpetual Grace, LTD	Yes	Yes	Yes	Co-creator; writer (10 episodes), director (6 episodes)
2021	Ultra City Smiths	Yes	Yes	Yes	Creator; writer (6 episodes), director (6 episodes)
2026	DTF St. Louis	Yes	Yes	Yes	Creator; writer, director

== Awards and nominations ==
Year	Award	Category	Nominated work	Result	Ref.
2017	Christopher Awards	Feature Film	Wonder	Won	
2017	Critics' Choice Movie Awards	Best Adapted Screenplay	Wonder	Nominated	
2026	Gotham TV Awards	Outstanding Limited or Anthology Series	DTF St. Louis	Won	
2026	Primetime Emmy Awards	Outstanding Limited or Anthology Series	DTF St. Louis	Won	
2026	Primetime Creative Arts Emmy Awards	Outstanding Directing for a Limited or Anthology Series or Movie	DTF St. Louis	Won	
2026	Primetime Creative Arts Emmy Awards	Outstanding Writing for a Limited or Anthology Series or Movie	DTF St. Louis	Won	
