= Bowlers' Club of New South Wales =

Registered club at 99 York Street, Sydney, Australia

Bowler's Club of New South Wales
- Formation: 1958
- Type: Registered club
- Location: Sydney, New South Wales, Australia
- Members: 9055
- President: David Conroy
- Website: www.99onyork.com.au

The Bowlers' Club of New South Wales is a registered club located at 99 York Street, Sydney, Australia.

== History ==
The club was established in 1958 and was granted a provisional liquor licence in that year.

== Location ==
The club was originally located at the northern end of Clarence Street and relocated to its current premises at 99 York Street in 1971.

== Awards ==
The Bowlers' Club at 99 on York won the 2010 City of Sydney Business Award in the Pubs, Hotels, Nightclubs & Venues category.

== Financial ==
The club made a net profit of $2,248,646 for the year ended 31 May 2010 and had net assets of $17,672,493 at that date. The profit includes a gain of $2,684,685 on the disposal of the club's 3rd floor strata.

== See also ==
- List of restaurant chains in Australia
