= GJR =

GJR may refer to:

== Transport ==
- Gjögur Airport, serving Árneshreppur district, Iceland
- Grand Junction Railroad, in the Boston, Massachusetts, area
- Grand Junction Railway, an early railway company in England
- Grand Junction Railway (Ontario), a defunct railway company in Canada
- Guelph Junction Railway, in Guelph, Ontario, Canada

== Other uses ==
- George Junior Republic, a residential treatment center in Freeville, New York
- George Junior Republic (Pennsylvania), a residential treatment center near Grove City, Pennsylvania
- Gurindji Kriol language
- G. J. R. Krishnan, Indian violinist
