= Guy Williamson =

American football player and coach (1890–1930)

Biographical details
- Born: July 14, 1890; Pendleton, Indiana, U.S.
- Died: December 8, 1930 (aged 40); Pittsburgh, Pennsylvania, U.S.

Playing career
- 1913–1915: Pittsburgh
- Position: Quarterback

Coaching career (HC unless noted)
- 1921–1923: Grove City
- 1924–1926: Pittsburgh (assistant)

Head coaching record
- Overall: 16–10–2

Accomplishments and honors

Awards
- All-American (1915)

Guy M. "Chalky" Williamson (July 14, 1890 – December 8, 1930) was an American football player and coach. He served as the head football coach at Grove City College in Grove City, Pennsylvania from 1921 to 1923, compiling a record of 16–10–2.

Williamson was the starting quarterback for the national champion 1915 Pittsburgh Panthers football team.

Williamson later coached at The Kiski School in Saltsburg, Pennsylvania. He died at age 40, on December 8, 1930, at a hospital in Pittsburgh.

== Head coaching record ==
Year	Team	Overall	Conference	Standing	Bowl/playoffs
Grove City Crimson (Independent) (1921–1923)
1921	Grove City	7–2–1			
1922	Grove City	5–3–1			
1923	Grove City	4–5			
Grove City:		16–10–2			
Total:		16–10–2			
