= Finding Fish =

2001 book by Antwone Fisher

- Author: Antwone Fisher
- Genre: Autobiography
- Publisher: William Morrow & Company
- Publication date: 2001
- ISBN: 0-688-17699-2

Finding Fish is a 2001 autobiographical book by Antwone Fisher. It was a New York Times Bestseller.

== Plot ==
Antwone Fisher was born in prison to an incarcerated mother and a father who had been shot by a girlfriend. After being placed in foster care, Fisher was treated brutally and blamed for his own misfortunes. He was also sexually abused by a woman who often babysat him from around age 3 to 8. He then was sent to George Junior Republic. Eventually, he found his way into a stable job in the Navy.

== Film ==
Later in adulthood, Fisher became a security guard at Sony Pictures Studios, where his story inspired producer Todd Black to make a film, Antwone Fisher, based on his story.
