= Antwone Fisher =

American director, screenwriter, author and film producer

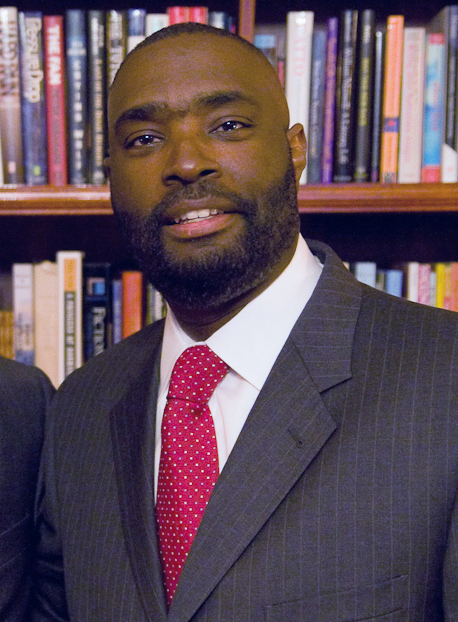
- Fisher in May 2010
- Born: Antwon Quenton Fisher; August 3, 1959 (age 66); Cleveland, Ohio, U.S.
- Occupations: Director; producer; screenwriter
- Spouse: LaNette Fisher (m. 1996)
- Children: 2
- Website: www.AntwoneFisher.net

Antwone Quenton Fisher (born August 3, 1959) is an American director, screenwriter, author, and film producer. His 2001 autobiographical book Finding Fish was a New York Times Best Seller. The 2002 film Antwone Fisher was written by Fisher and directed by Denzel Washington.

== Early life and education ==
Fisher was born in prison to 17-year-old single mother Eva Mae Fisher. His father, 23-year-old Edward Elkins, had been shot dead by a jealous girlfriend two months earlier. Antwone was placed in a foster home weeks after he was born, and remained in foster care through most of his childhood. After living with a foster mother for two years, Fisher was taken away from her. He was then placed into another foster home with Rev. Ulysses and Isabella Pickett. He spent 14 years of his childhood with the Picketts. Antwone was sent to George Junior Republic School, a discipline school for boys, from which he graduated before he joined the United States Navy.

== Career ==
=== Government work ===
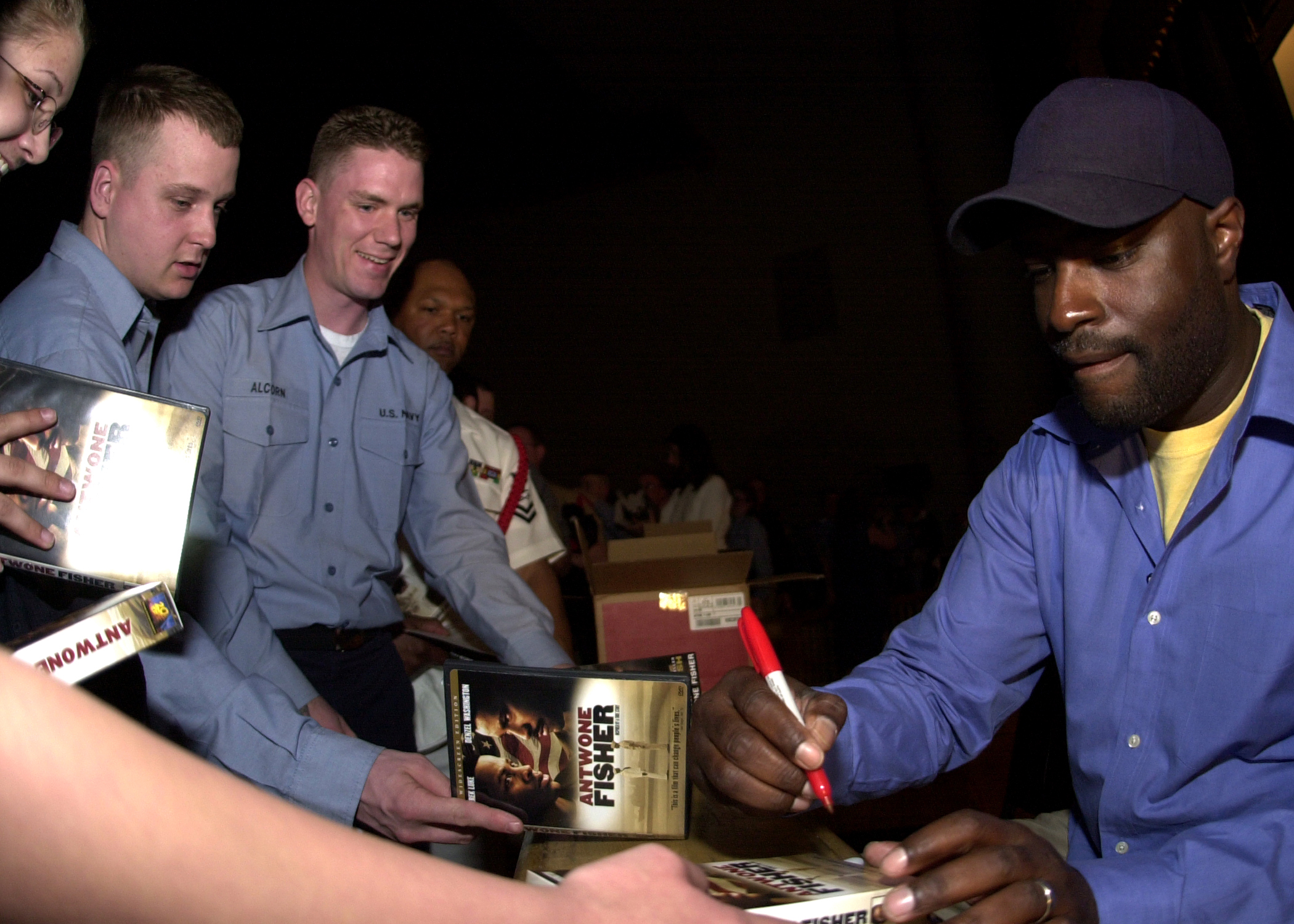
Fisher speaks to sailors gathered in Naval Station Great Lakes' Ross Auditorium about his experiences in the Navy in 2003.

Fisher joined the U.S. Navy to escape homelessness. Fisher spent 12 years in the Navy and separated from military service in 1989. Here, he met Lt. Commander Williams, a psychiatrist who helped him work through his emotional traumas. After his discharge from the Navy, Fisher joined the Federal Bureau of Prisons as a federal correctional officer.

=== Writer and filmmaker ===
After three years with the Bureau of Prisons, he began work as a security guard for Sony Pictures. It was there Fisher decided to find his true family members. He contacted Annette Elkins, who turned out to be his aunt. Within months of this contact, Fisher met all of his family, including his mother Eva Mae. He learned that she had given birth to four other children who were all taken away as wards of the state. Fisher wrote that after their meeting, "In the place inside me where the hurt of abandonment had been, now only compassion lived."

Fisher penned his screenplay. Stories about Fisher's life began spreading around the Sony lot, and many people from Hollywood lined up to develop the project. He initially declined all offers. After writing over 40 drafts, he sold the rights to his story to 20th Century Fox. The feature film Antwone Fisher was directed by Denzel Washington, and starred Derek Luke in the title role. Fisher was credited as both writer and co-producer.

Fisher is still working as a director, author, poet, lecturer, college professor, movie producer, and screenwriter. His latest book, A Boy Should Know How to Tie a Tie: And Other Lessons for Succeeding in Life, was published by Simon & Schuster in April 2010.

Fisher has written and directed other films, including a documentary, This Life of Mine: The Story of Leon T. Garr, a short film, "My Summer Friend", starring Michael T. Williams, and was a co-writer of the 2006 American drama ATL.

== Personal life ==
Fisher and his wife, LaNette Canister, married December 1, 1996. They have two children, Azure and Indigo.

== Awards and honors ==
- Honorary Doctor of Humane Letters, Cleveland State University (May 10, 2003)
