= 1915 Pittsburgh Panthers football team =

American college football season

1915 Pittsburgh Panthers football
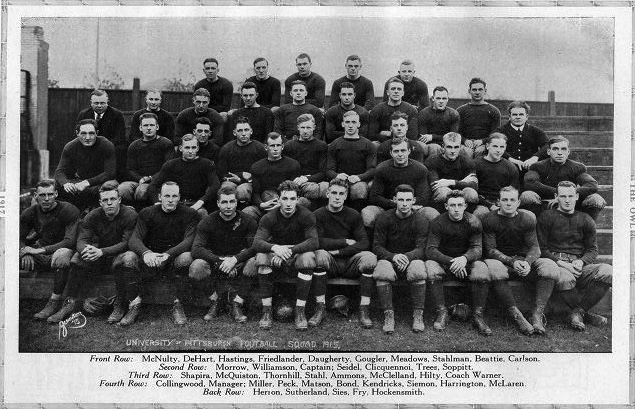

Co-national champion (Davis)
- Conference: Independent
- Record: 8–0
- Head coach: Pop Warner (1st season)
- Offensive scheme: Double wing
- Captain: Guy Williamson
- Home stadium: Forbes Field

1915 Eastern college football independents records
	Conf.			Overall
Team	W	L	T	W		L		T
Cornell		–		9	–	0	–	0
Pittsburgh		–		8	–	0	–	0
Columbia		–		5	–	0	–	0
Harvard		–		8	–	1	–	0
Carnegie Tech		–		7	–	1	–	0
Rutgers		–		7	–	1	–	0
Villanova		–		6	–	1	–	0
Washington & Jefferson		–		8	–	1	–	1
Colgate		–		5	–	1	–	0
Syracuse		–		9	–	1	–	2
Dartmouth		–		7	–	1	–	1
Tufts		–		5	–	1	–	2
Penn State		–		7	–	2	–	0
Lafayette		–		8	–	3	–	0
Princeton		–		6	–	2	–	0
Franklin & Marshall		–		6	–	2	–	0
Temple		–		3	–	1	–	1
Geneva		–		6	–	3	–	0
Wesleyan		–		6	–	3	–	0
Allegheny		–		5	–	3	–	0
Swarthmore		–		5	–	3	–	0
Army		–		5	–	3	–	1
Lehigh		–		6	–	4	–	0
Holy Cross		–		3	–	2	–	2
Brown		–		5	–	4	–	1
Fordham		–		4	–	4	–	0
NYU		–		4	–	4	–	1
Middlebury		–		3	–	4	–	2
Muhlenberg		–		4	–	5	–	0
Yale		–		4	–	5	–	0
Boston College		–		3	–	4	–	0
Penn		–		3	–	5	–	2
WPI		–		3	–	5	–	1
Buffalo		–		3	–	5	–	0
Carlisle		–		3	–	6	–	2
Rhode Island State		–		3	–	5	–	0
New Hampshire		–		3	–	6	–	1
Gettysburg		–		3	–	6	–	0
Rochester		–		3	–	6	–	0
Bucknell		–		2	–	6	–	3
Vermont		–		1	–	4	–	2
Williams		–		1	–	7	–	0

The 1915 Pittsburgh Panthers football team represented the University of Pittsburgh in the 1915 college football season. In his first season with the program, head coach Pop Warner led the Panthers to wins in all eight games and they outscored their opponents by a combined total of 247–19. Home games were held at Forbes Field, the ballpark of baseball's Pittsburgh Pirates.

== Schedule ==
Date	Opponent	Site	Result	Attendance	Source
October 2	Westminster (PA)	Forbes Field; Pittsburgh, PA	W 32–0		
October 9	at Navy	Worden Field; Annapolis, MD	W 47–12		
October 16	Carlisle	Forbes Field; Pittsburgh, PA	W 45–0		
October 23	at Penn	Franklin Field; Philadelphia, PA	W 14–7	15,000–20,000	
October 30	Allegheny	Forbes Field; Pittsburgh, PA	W 42–7		
November 6	Washington & Jefferson	Forbes Field; Pittsburgh, PA	W 19–0	33,000–40,000	
November 13	Carnegie Tech	Forbes Field; Pittsburgh, PA	W 28–0	10,000	
November 25	Penn State	Forbes Field; Pittsburgh, PA (rivalry)	W 20–0	30,000	

== Preseason ==
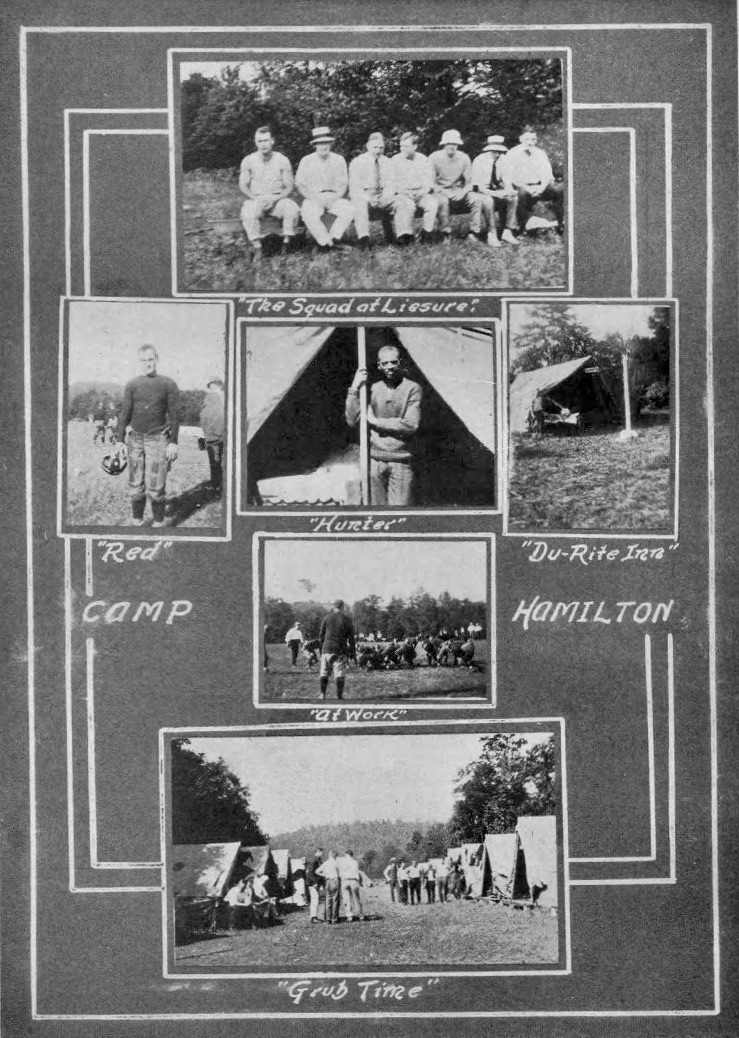
1915 preseason at Camp Hamilton

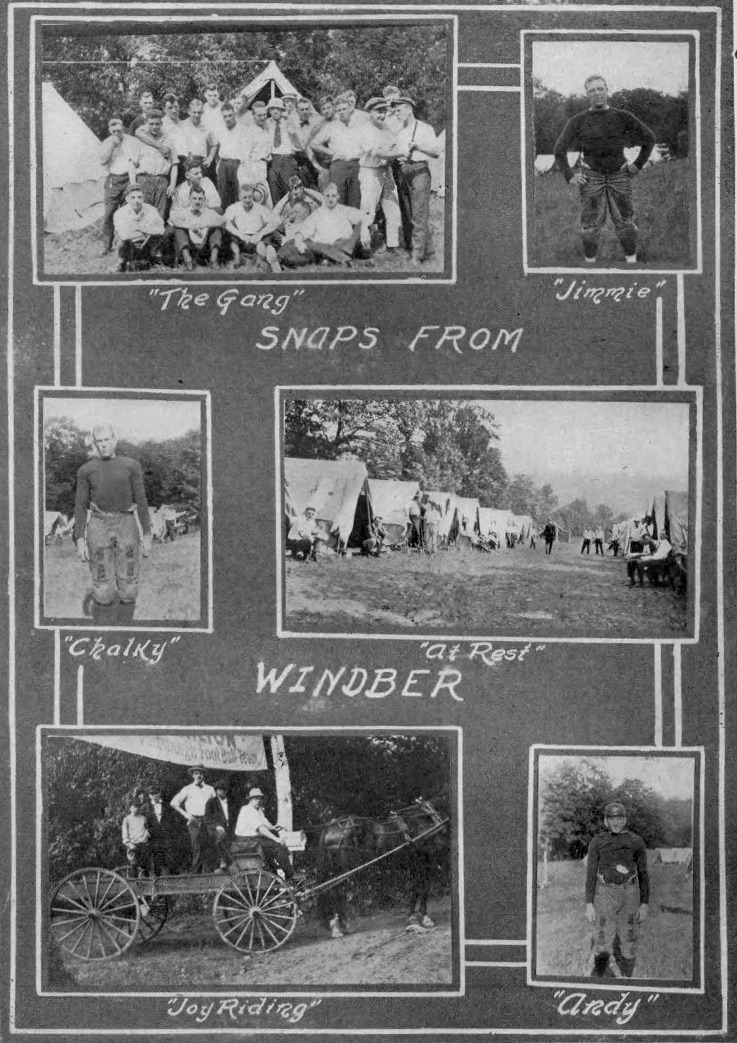
1915 preseason at Camp Hamilton

On December 4, 1914, by a unanimous vote of the athletic committee, "Glenn Warner was officially chosen to coach the University of Pittsburgh gridders for the next three seasons."

Pitt athletic booster Joseph Trees and athletic director A. R. Hamilton hired Pop Warner as Pitt's head coach in 1914. Warner, who had previously led Carlisle, Cornell, and Georgia, had been successful at his previous stops, mentoring the likes of Jim Thorpe, and was known as an innovator of the game who originated the screen pass, single- and double-wing formations, and use of shoulder and thigh pads. His arrival at Pitt gave the program instant national credibility, lifting the perception of the program from a regional power to that of a national one.

The 1916 Owl Yearbook was upbeat about the 1915 football season: "The football prospects at Pitt for the season 1915 are brighter than ever before augmented in great measure by the fact that Glenn S. Warner, a grizzled veteran of the gridiron, has been secured to succeed Joe Duff as head coach. Warner comes here from the Carlisle Indian School, where he has gained fame year after year by turning out formidable football machines. Today he is ranked as one of the greatest coaches in America."

Walter Camp prophesied in The Gazette Times: "The shift of Coach Warner from the Carlisle Indians to the University of Pittsburgh marks one of the great changes in the status of the game...It should prove a very interesting experiment for Pittsburgh and one with great possibilities."

The January 8 edition of The Pitt Weekly noted: "The football card for 1915 is still somewhat up in the air. Negotiations with Penn for a date in Philadelphia or Pittsburgh next season have terminated in the refusal of the Red and Blue to tie up with the University, so that the October 23 date remains open. Penn has been in a rut for several seasons and presumably, .. couldn't see adding to their troubles by taking on Pitt." Six days later The Pittsburgh Post reported a complete reversal: "The two big institutions of learning of the Keystone state, University of Pennsylvania and University of Pittsburgh, will meet next fall in football. The game will be played on Franklin Field, Philadelphia, October 23." The schedule only had eight games because Cornell refused to come to Pittsburgh and Pitt was not invited to Ithaca. Pitt never played Cornell again.

On January 14 the University of Pittsburgh Athletic Council adopted the one-year residency rule for the sports of football, basketball, baseball and track beginning in the fall of 1916. On June 15 the university hired Andrew Kerr as freshman football coach. "It was appreciated that in order to keep up the strength of the varsity, a man who could develop material in the freshman squad was absolutely necessary. Kerr is a famous teacher of football and should add strength to the Pitt football organization. With the freshman football coaching problem solved, and a man of the caliber of Kerr secured, Pitt athletic enthusiasts are content these days that the one year rule will not hamper their progress in getting to the front rank in football."

On September 8, the Pitt football aspirants started drills at Camp Hamilton, the preseason training camp at Windber, PA, under the tutelage of Coach Warner. The team will "go through a three weeks course of preparation for the strenuous season which is before them." "Several holes have been left in the Blue and Gold lineup by graduation and other causes. Heil, Collins, Ward, Hanley, Cliff Morrow and Dillon are all lost from the 1914 backfield, while Smith, Reese, Jones and Healy are among those missing from the line and end positions. This gives Warner some serious problems in finding men to replace those who have left. A large part of the coach's time will be taken up by the development of the new talent."

The first week of camp Coach Warner was ably assisted by "E. E. Tarr of Baltimore, who is to be head coach of Bethany College this fall. Mr. Tarr coached for several years in the South, and was for a time associated with Mr. Warner at Carlisle. Most of his time here has been spent with the backfield candidates."

"When I took the squad to Windber," said Warner, "I found that I had many strong natural players who knew more football than one generally sees in a college football eleven. This was a new experience for me and it enabled me to get off to a flying start. I knew after one week at Windber that we would have a great team, because the boys are crazy over the game."

The team returned to Pittsburgh on September 24 and had a week to practice on Forbes Field until their opening game. On Saturday the 25th "Coach Warner and A. R. Hamilton of Pitt were on the W. & J. bench getting a line on the playing of the Red and Black. They saw nothing worthwhile, for Bob Folwell had his men use straight football methods."

The 1915 Pittsburgh Pirates finished in fifth place so the Pitt eleven were able to play all their games at Forbes Field. Special bleachers were installed for the students. "The Freshmen class being assigned to the right field cheering space will be given a cheer leader of their own, and will be worked to the limit to win the rooting decision over their upper class rivals (across the field in the left field section). Another feature, continuing a custom of many years at Pitt games, will be the wearing of numbers by both teams."

The University of Pittsburgh Athletic Council published the seventy-six page Sixth Annual Football Year Book for use as the 1915 game day program. The cover illustration was done by Rowland R. Murdoch, illustrator for the Pittsburgh Press.

== Coaching staff ==
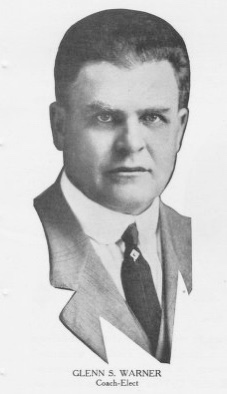
Glenn Warner

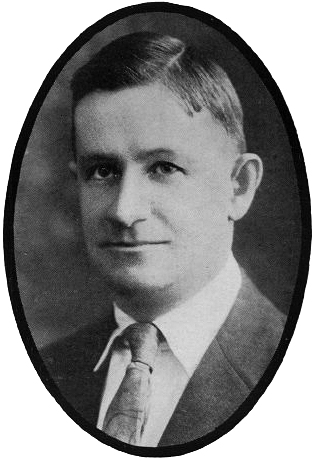
Andrew Kerr

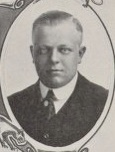
A. K. Collingwood

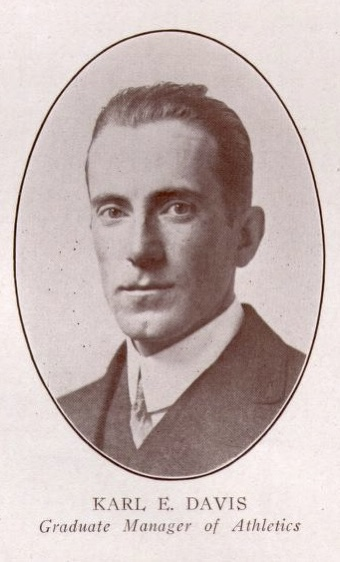
Karl E. Davis

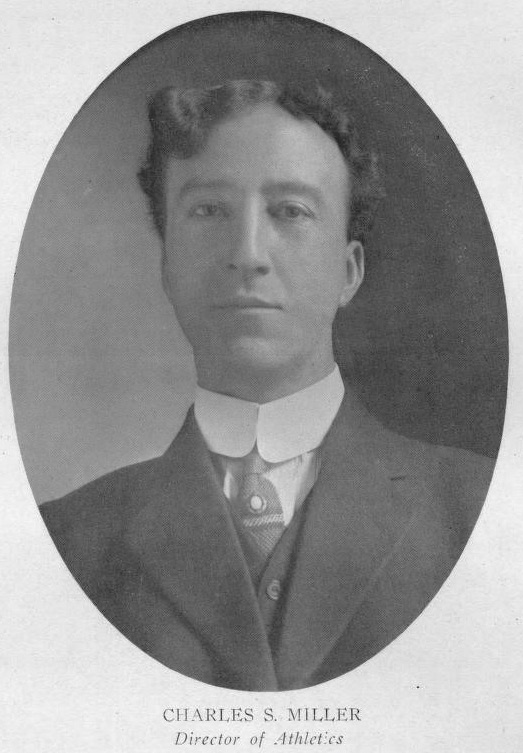
Charles S. Miller

1915 Pittsburgh Panthers football staff
Coaching staff: Glenn S. Warner – Head coach; Andrew Kerr – Assistant / freshman coach	Support staff: A. K. Collingwood – Student football manager; Karl E. Davis – Graduate manager of athletics; Charles S. Miller – Director of athletics

== Roster ==
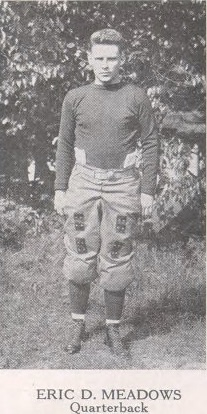
Eric Meadows

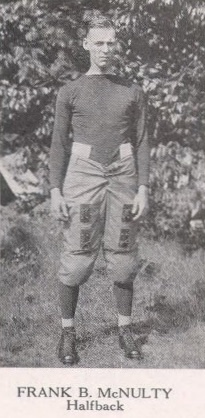
Frank McNulty

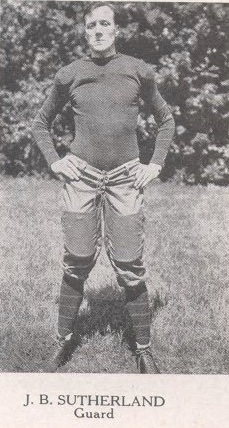
John Sutherland

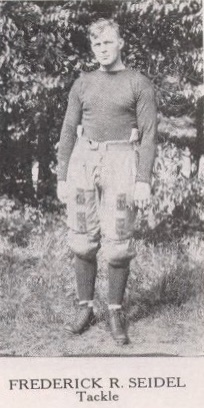
Fred Seidel

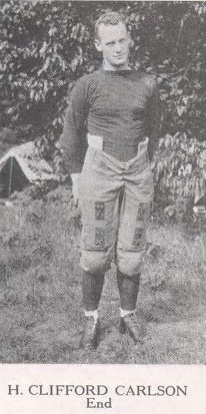
H. Clifford Carlson

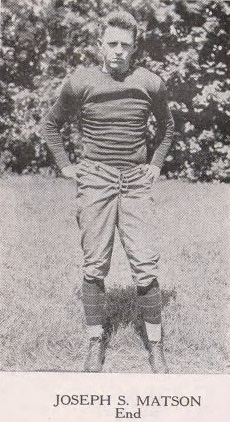
Joe Matson

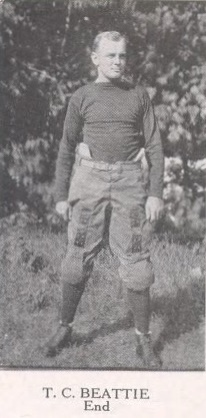
Thomas Beattie

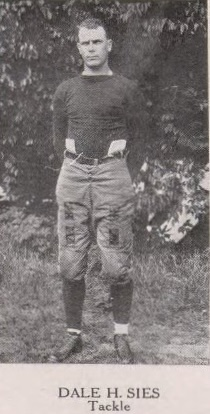
Dave Sies

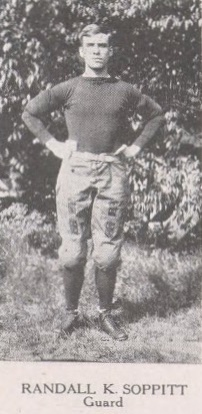
Randall Soppitt

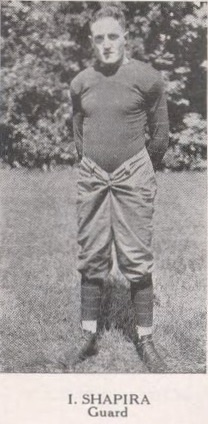
Isadore Shapira

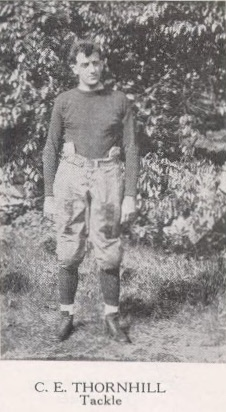
Claude Thornhill

1915 Pittsburgh Panthers football roster
Player	Position	Games	Height	Weight	Class	Prep School	Degree	Residence
Guy Williamson*	halfback	8	5' 9"	153	1916	New Mexico Military Academy	School of Mines	Indianapolis, IN
O. C. Ammons	end	3	5' 9"	144	1919	Arkansas City H. S.	Dental	Arkansas City, KS
Thomas J. Beattie*	tackle	6	5' 7"	150	1916	Bellefonte Academy	Doctor of Dental Surgery	Wheeling, WVA
James Bond Jr.	guard	5	5' 8"	188	1918	Pittsburgh Central H. S.	College	Pittsburgh, PA
H. Clifford Carlson*	end	8	5' 10"	170	1918	Bellefonte Academy	Doctor of Dental Surgery	Fayette City, PA
Ralph N. Clicquennoi	tackle	3	6'	170	1918	Warren H.S.	Economics	Warren, PA
James DeHart*	halfback	8	5' 6"	150	1918	Reynoldsville H.S.	Associate College	Reynoldsville, PA
Roy A. Easterday	end/halfback	0	5' 8"	148	1919	Lisbon H. S. (Ohio)	Economics	Lisbon, OH
Frank E. Eckert	end	0	5' 8"	148	1919	Ridgway H. S.	Mines	Ridgway, PA
Sam Friedlander	quarterback	2	5' 7"	149	1917	Greensburg H. S.	Dental	Greensburg, PA
George K. Fry*	fullback	7	5' 11"	165	1917	Rochester H.S.	Associate College	Rochester, PA
Roscoe A. Gougler	quarterback	4	5' 8"	156	1919	Harrisburg H. S.	College	Harrisburg, PA
William E. Harrington	end	4	5' 8"	155	1918	Conway Hall	Associate Economics	Bentlyville, PA
Andy Hastings*	halfback	7	5' 9"	170	1918	Brookville H.S.	Economics	Brookville, PA
George L. Heil	quarterback	0	5' 6"	134	1919	Topeka H. S. (KS)	Economics	Topeka, KS
James P. Herron*	end	8	5' 10"	135	1915	Monessen H.S.	Bachelor of Arts	Kent, OH
Leonard F. Hilty	tackle	7	5' 10"	183	1918	Peabody H. S.	Economics	Pittsburgh, PA
Carl Hockensmith*	center	5	5' 11"	220	1916	The Kiski School	Associate Engineering	Penn Station, PA
Thomas R. Kendrick Jr.	center	2	5' 8"	178	1918	Duquesne H. S.	College	Duquesne, PA
Frank E. Lobaugh	end	0	5' 10"	149	1918	Ridgway H. S.	Mines	Ridgway PA
William D. McClelland	fullback	5	5' 10"	161	1918	Pittsburgh Central H. S.	Economics	Pittsburgh, PA
George W. McClaren*	fullback/end	5	5' 9"	174	1919	Peabody H.S.	Economics	Pittsburgh, PA
Frank B. McNulty*	halfback	5	5' 10"	146	1919	Mercersburg Academy	Economics	Carnegie, PA
James McQuiston	guard	2	5'	175	1917	Slippery Rock Normal	Doctor of Dental Surgery	Slippery Rock, PA
Joe Matson	tackle	1	5' 11"	165	1918	Shadyside Academy	Dental School	Pittsburgh, PA
Eric D. Meadows*	quarterback	6	5' 4"	140	1918	Pittsburgh Central H. S.	Engineering	Pittsburgh, PA
William H. Miller*	halfback	3	5' 7"	155	1918	Wyoming Seminary	Economics	Shenandoah, PA
John S. Morrow	halfback	3	5' 9"	155	1919	Carnegie H.S.	Engineering	Carnegie, PA
Bob Peck*	halfback	8	5' 8"	173	1917	Pawling School N.Y.	Economics	Lock Haven, PA
Fred A. Seidel	tackle	5	5' 11"	197	1919	Bellefonte Academy	Economics	Hazelton, PA
Isadore Shapira*	center	5	5' 10"	180	1916	East Liberty Academy	Bachelor of Science in Economics	Pittsburgh, PA
Frederick H. Siemon	guard	2	5' 11"	187	1919	Indiana Normal	Mines	Indiana, PA
Dale H. Sies*	fullback/tackle	6	6' 1"	195	1919	Davenport H. S. (IA)	College	Davenport, IA
Chester Smith	fullback	0	5' 10"	157	1919	State Normal School (Valley City, ND)	Education	Edgeley, ND
Randall Soppitt*	guard	8	6' 1"	185	1917	Greensburg H.S.	School of Mines	Latrobe, PA
Edward A. Stahl	guard	4	5' 11"	184	1919	Bellefonte Academy	Economics	Scranton, PA
Harry A. Stahlman	halfback	4	5' 2"	132	1917	Charleroi H. S.	Dental	Charleroi, PA
John B. Sutherland*	tackle	7	6' 2"	175	1917	Oberlin Academy	Doctor of Dental Surgery	Cooper Angus, Scotland
Claude E. Thornhill*	tackle	6	6' 0"	200	1917	Beaver H.S.	School of Mines	Beaver, PA
Ferdinand Wachter	end	0	6'	148	1917	Parnassus H. S.	Engineering	Parnassus, PA
* Letterman

== Game summaries ==
=== Westminster ===
Week 1: Westminster at Pitt

Team	1	2	3	4	Total
Westminster	0	0	0	0	0
• Pitt	7	12	13	0	32

- Date: October 2, 1915
- Location: Forbes Field
  Pittsburgh, PA
- Game start: 3:00 p.m.
- Referee: Ewing Rafferty (Princeton)

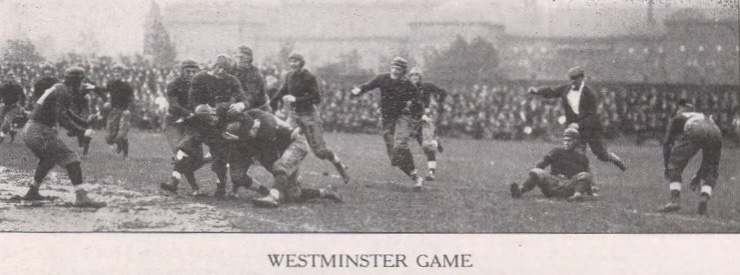
1915 Pitt versus Westminster game action

Westminster College was the opening game opponent for the Glenn Warner era of Pitt football. Westminster was seeking their first victory in the series that dated back to 1898. The September 29 issue of The Gazette Times reported: "Five of the Westminster College's football stars were expelled from college today because of participation in hazing pranks. Because of the expulsions the team will be greatly crippled in its football season and game against the University of Pittsburgh. The five men are all upperclassmen and formed the backbone of the varsity team." "Coach Warner's charges were pronounced in tip-top shape for the opener with only two or three slight injuries interfering with a perfect record as to condition."

Richard Guy of The Gazette Times was impressed: "The University of Pittsburgh inaugurated its 1915 gridiron season yesterday afternoon at Forbes Field by beating Westminster College, 32 to 0, and sent a large crowd of local patrons away from the park well pleased with the article of football shown by Glenn Warner's pupils." "Saturday a string of men sat on the Pitt bench; there were enough to start two more teams, and everyone of them appeared to perform hard physical work. This is an asset very valuable to Pitt, for it is well fortified in material, and not only for this year, but for the next four or five."

W. B. McVicker of The Pittsburg Press added: "For strategic reasons, Glenn Warner called upon many of his reservists and 15 of these warriors received their first baptism of fire among the chalk-marked trenches...A fair-sized, but highly enthusiastic crowd of noncombatants witnessed the fray from the grandstand and bleachers, while the newly constructed stands on either side of the field were filled with noisy camp followers who endeavored to shatter their opponents' army with terrific and well rehearsed yells."

Pitt scored one touchdown late in the first period. They gained possession on their own 33-yard line. Guy Williamson "tore off a thrilling run, placing the ball on Westminster's 36-yard line." Six plays later Williamson scored and George Fry added the goal. Pitt led 7–0.

Early in the second quarter Pitt had the ball at midfield. After George Fry and George McLaren advanced the ball for a first down, "Williamson gave another demonstration of his open field running by adding 25 yards on a criss-cross pass. This brought the ball to the Westminster 9-yard line." McLaren plunged into the end zone for the touchdown on fourth down. Fry missed the goal kick. Pitt regained possession and advanced the ball quickly downfield on rushes by DeHart, Fry and Williamson. The Westminster defense stiffened. "Finally, Williamson threw a forward pass over the line, and there were two men under it, Herron and Carlson, who both jumped for it. Neither knew the other and both had a hold on the ball and fought for it. It was decided Herron had hold of it first. Fry missed another chance at goal." The halftime score read Pitt 19 to Westminster 0.

"Williamson had a running matinee in the early stages of the third period. First, he ran the kick-off back 30 yards to the Pitt 40-yard line, and then he tore through the opposition for 54 yards bringing the ball only several yards from the goal line." Jim Morrow scored the touchdown and the goal after was unsuccessful. The Pitt defense forced Westminster to punt. Williamson fielded it on the Westminster 45-yard line. "The Pitt captain swung to the right and started towards the Westminster goal. Bob Peck cut across and bowled over tackler after tackler and soon it was a clear road for Williamson. Peck kicked the resultant goal after and the score was 32–0 in favor of Pitt."

The fourth quarter was scoreless as Coach Warner made wholesale substitutions.

The Pitt Weekly noted: "The game Saturday was one of the cleanest ever staged on Forbes Field. Not a penalty was inflicted on either side during the entire game."

The Pitt lineup for the game against Westminster was H. Clifford Carlson, William Harrington and Dale Sies (left end), Claude Thornhill and Leonard Hilty (left tackle), John Sutherland and James Bond Jr. (left guard), Bob Peck and Thomas Kendrick Jr. (center), Randall Soppitt and James McQuiston (right guard), Isadore Shapira, Fred Seidel and Ralph Chiquennoi (right tackle), James Herron, Thomas Beattie and O. C. Ammons (right end), Guy Williamson, Eric Meadows and James DeHart (quarterback), George McLaren, James Morrow and Sam Friedlander (left halfback), James DeHart, Whitey Miller and Henry Stahlman (right halfback), and George Fry and William McClelland (fullback). The first half consisted of two 12-minute quarters and the second half consisted of two 10-minute quarters.

=== At Navy ===
Week 2: Pitt at Navy

Team	1	2	3	4	Total
• Pitt	14	7	7	19	47
Navy	0	6	0	6	12

- Date: October 9, 1915
- Location: Worden Field
  Annapolis, MD
- Game start: 2:30 p.m.
- Referee: Robert W. "Tiny" Maxwell (Swarthmore)

The second game for the 1915 season was a road trip to Annapolis, MD to take on the Midshipmen of the Naval Academy. The Middies were led by first year coach Jonas H. Ingram and were 0–1 on the season, having lost to Georgetown. Navy would finish the season 3–5–1. "The Pitt boys leave the city at 11:10 (Friday night) accompanied by a number of students and alumni who go as rooters. In accordance with the request of the university faculty, that the team be away as short a time as possible, the return trip will be made tomorrow (Saturday) night, so the players will miss only their Saturday morning classes."

The Baltimore Sun put it bluntly: "The husky Midshipmen found themselves powerless to check Pittsburgh's scoring machine and as a result they were walloped in the annual game here this afternoon by a count of 47 to 12. It was the most severe drubbing administered to the sailor lads since the Army game of 10 years ago, when the rival West point cadets won by 40 to 5."

Richard Guy of The Gazette Times lauded Pitt: "The University of Pittsburgh football forces swept the Midshipmen aside in a whirlwind fashion this afternoon, and gave the Navy one of its most crushing defeats in history. The final score was Pitt 47, Navy 12, and the disparity in the Navy points about tells the difference in the relative strength of the two teams. The attack which Pitt showed this afternoon was of a whirlwind nature, crushing, bewildering and irresistible. The Midshipmen were powerless before it."

Florent Gibson of The Pittsburgh Post entertained: "While Pitt was expected to trim the Middies, no one expected Warner's month-old machine to demonstrate that, for national defense, the Navy is a liability rather than an asset. The Pitt machine drubbed the Sailors as they haven't been trimmed since the War of 1812, and the convincing manner in which it was done demonstrates that Warner's system is producing results at Pitt in its very first year."

"Pittsburgh invaded the Navy goal line on seven occasions and five of the attempts at goal were successful." The touchdowns were scored by George McLaren (2), Andy Hastings, Guy Williamson, Whitey Miller, Leonard Hilty and Jimmy DeHart. George Fry kicked 3 goals and Andy Hastings and Bob Peck added one each. "The most sensational affair of the whole game was staged when "Jimmie" DeHart caught a kick off five yards behind his own goal line and with perfect interference streaked the entire length of the field for a touchdown."

"The first touchdown of the opposition was registered by Martin, the Navy right end, when he pulled Fry's uncovered pass out of the sky on his own ten yard line and raced ninety yards for the score. "Navy's second score was hung up in the final quarter, when Williamson, standing for a kick formation 13 yards from his goal line, fumbled and Navy recovered the ball. The Middies made a mighty effort here. Four plunges through the line were successful, Vail finally going over for the touchdown."

"Though outplayed and outmaneuvered at every stage, Navy lived up to its traditions and went down fighting. Even at the end of the match with Pitt 35 points ahead, the sailors fought back the visitors' approach and recovered a fumble in the very last second's of play on their one yard line."

The Pitt lineup for the game with Navy was H. Clifford Carlson and Dale Sies (left end), Claude Thornhill and Leonard Hilty (left tackle), John Sutherland (left guard), Bob Peck (center), Randall Soppitt (right guard), Carl Hockensmith and Fred Seidel (rightn tackle), James Herron (right end), Guy Williamson and Jimmy DeHart (quarterback), Andy Hastings (left halfback), Whitey Miller (right halfback), and George Fry and George McLaren (fullback). The game was played in 12-minute quarters.

=== Carlisle ===
Week 3: Carlisle at Pitt

Team	1	2	3	4	Total
Carlisle	0	0	0	0	0
• Pitt	14	14	3	14	45

- Date: October 16, 1915
- Location: Forbes Field
  Pittsburgh, PA
- Game start: 3:00 p.m.
- Referee: M. J. Thompson (Georgetown)

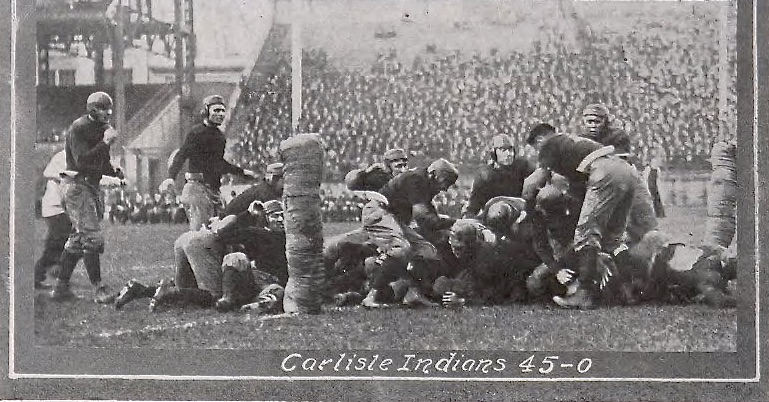
1915 Pitt versus Carlisle football game action

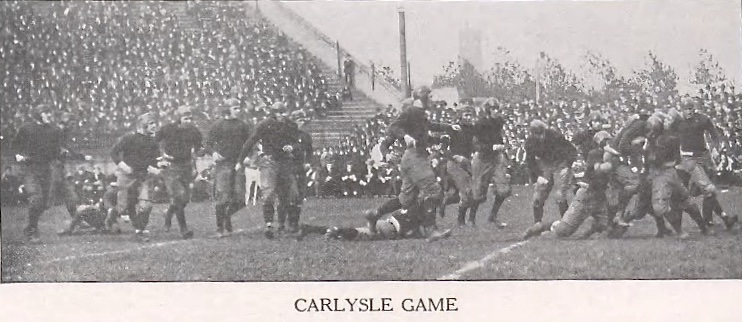
1915 Pitt versus Carlisle football game action

On October 16 the Pitt and Carlisle elevens met for the eighth and final time. Carlisle led by first year coach Victor Kelly sported a 1–2–1 record. They would finish the season 3–6–2. According to Richard Guy of the Pittsburgh Post-Gazette: "The Indians said they were in great shape and expected to win today's game. Pitt will line up without the services of Sutherland, guard, and Hockensmith, tackle, both being laid up with injuries."

"This will be the only game in Pittsburgh this year operated under the four-official system, which is permitted under the rules as revived last winter. Few teams are taking advantage of the change in the regulations which allow the use of the field judge, and the Penn contest is the only other one on the Pitt schedule in which this official will be use."

"This afternoon marks the initial appearance for the season of the Pitt's student band. The music makers will lead the big parade of students which forms at Thaw Hall at 2 o'clock, marching through Oakland to Forbes Field."

Richard Guy of The Gazette Times gave the usual laudatory report: "The Carlisle Indians were defeated by the representatives of the University of Pittsburgh in their annual football game yesterday afternoon on the Forbes Field gridiron by the lopsided score of 45 to 0. It was a rout for the Indians, the worst in their gridiron history. Never at one moment during the one hour of activity on the field did the wards of Uncle Sam hold their own with the team which is now being coached by Glenn Warner, their old-time mentor. They were outplayed in every particular and outclassed."

W. B. McVicker of The Pittsburg Press was a bit more dramatic: "There is weeping and wailing about the campfires of the Carlisle Indians today and there is sadness in every teepee. That village's mightiest braves, all men of valor, were given the trouncing of their lives yesterday afternoon at Forbes Field by Pitt's paleface pigskin pushers, the final score being 45–0. Never before in the history of the Carlisle School did Uncle Sam's proteges receive such an unmerciful beating as handed them yesterday, and never before were the redskins so anxious to make a good showing. With their former coach, Glen Warner, in charge of the Pitt team, it was but natural that they should put forth every effort to hand a beating to the Gold and Blue."

"Six touchdowns, six goals from touchdown, and a neat field goal from (Roscoe) Gougler's toe brought the final score to its mark." The first half tallies were made by George Fry, twice, Guy Williamson and Andy Hastings. Fry connected on all four extra points. Roscoe Gougler and George McLaren scored the fourth quarter touchdowns with Gougler adding the goals after. "One play that fairly pulled the spectators to their feet was the 65-yard run of Capt. "Chalky" Williamson near the end of the first quarter. "Chalky" made his sensational spurt after grabbing Calac's long punt on Pitt's 35-yard line. Before crossing his opponent's goal line the local leader was compelled to travel through the entire Indian lineup, which he did in a manner that stamps him as one of the best open-field runners who has ever worn the Gold and Blue."

The Pitt lineup for the game against Carlisle was H. Clifford Carlson and William Harrington (left end), Claude Thornhill and Leon Hilty (left tackle), Dale Sies, James Bon d Jr., and Fred Sieman (left guard) Bob Peck and Thomas Kendrick (center), Randall Soppitt and Edward Stahl (right guard), Fred Seidel and Ralph Clicquennoi (right tackle), James Herron, Thomas Beattie, and O. C. Ammons (right end), Guy Williamson, Eric Meadows and James Morrow (quarterback), Andy Hastings and Roscoe Gougler (left halfback), Jimmy DeHart, Whitey Miller, Frank McNulty and Henry Stahlman (right halfback), and George Fry, George McLaren and William McClelland (fullback). The game was played in 15-minute quarters.

=== At Penn ===
Week 4: Pitt at Penn

Team	1	2	3	4	Total
• Pitt	0	7	0	7	14
Penn	0	0	0	7	7

- Date: October 23, 1915
- Location: Franklin Field
  Philadelphia, PA
- Game start: 2:30 p.m.
- Referee: Harvey Smith (Bucknell)

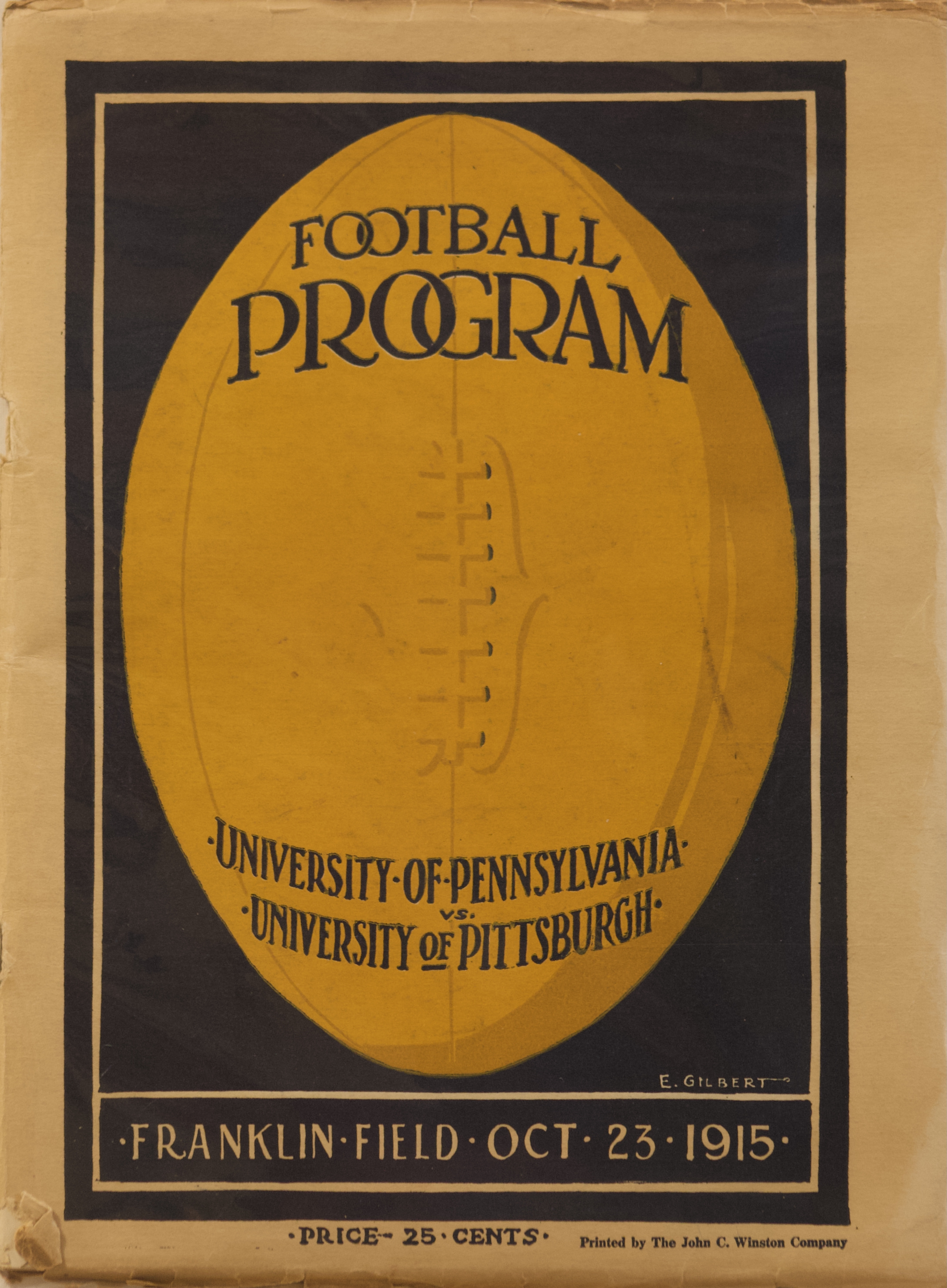
Franklin Field Illustrated for October 23, 1915 Pennsylvania vs. Pitt game

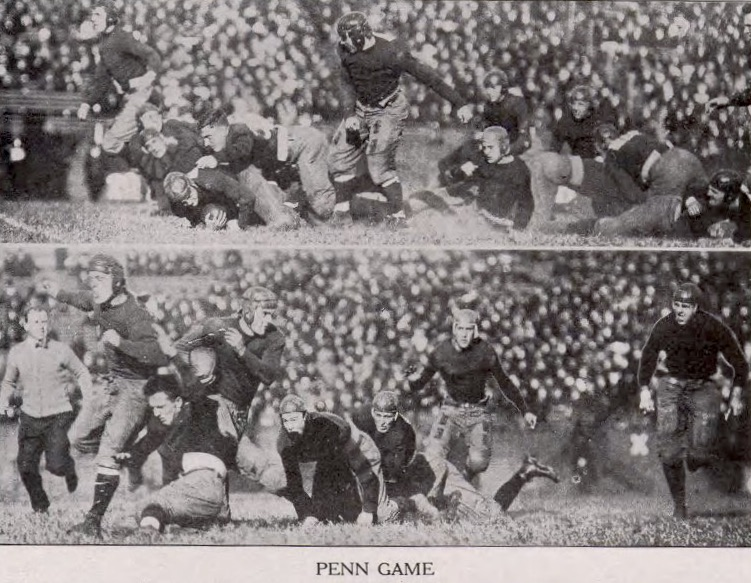
1915 Pitt at Penn football game action

"When Pitt lines up against Penn it will not have its strongest array on the field, for three of the most promising one-year men on the team who have been starring, will be kept out because of the one year residence rule, which will be in force against the Quakers. The trio is Sies, who played a very good game at guard against the Indians; Seidel, the tackle, and McLaren, fullback." In addition, halfback William Miller broke his ankle in the Carlisle game and was out for the season.

On October 22 at 12:01 p.m. the Pitt football team departed from Union Station accompanied by "coaches, trainers managers, alumni and students sufficient to fill a special train. Reaching Philadelphia at 8:45 (Friday night), the players will go immediately to the Hotel Normandy, but a few blocks from Franklin Field, and get an early sleeping start. Warner is figuring on having his men well rested."

"Members of the two teams will wear distinguishing numbers thus following the scheme first inaugurated at Pitt several years ago. This is one idea which the east owes the west, at any rate, and spectators at the big games may well be grateful for its spread."

Host Penn led by third year coach George H. Brooke had a 3–1–1 record, winning their first three games and then losing to Penn State and tying Navy. The Pitt Weekly noted: "The team that took the field for the Philadelphia was a different team than the one that lost to Penn State and tied with the Middies. Entering the game with all regular men in the lineup for the first time this year, the Penn eleven played their hardest and the form displayed was the best that they have shown for the past two years. But their efforts were unavailing. The squad that swamped the Navy and the Carlisle Indians could not be denied ultimate victory."

Robert W. Maxwell of the Evening Ledger opined: "When it is considered that Pitt came here with a well-trained and well-coached team, the men on edge to play the game of their lives to beat Penn, the performance of the Red and Blue is all the more remarkable. The team was not especially prepared for this contest. It was on the schedule and regarded merely as a "practice game" - a game to prepare the team for battles with Dartmouth, Michigan and Cornell."

The Philadelphia Inquirer was not impressed: "The football team of the University of Pittsburgh yesterday defeated Pennsylvania by the score of 14 to 7, or two touchdowns to one. It was a real victory for Pittsburgh, but that they did not win by a much larger score turned the defeat into a practical victory for Old Penn and made the 15,000 fans at Franklin Field happy."

The Pittsburgh Press summed it up best with the sub-headline: "Coach Warner's Men Fail to Play Their Best Game, But Gain Easy Decision Over Pennsylvania Eleven." W. B. McVicker reported: "Opposed to a team which the football critics of the country conceded to be one of the most formidable in the land, the Quaker City lads put up a battle that was worth traveling miles to witness. Throughout the 60 minutes the rivals were pitted against each other on the gridiron, there was not one single dull moment, while at the critical stages, the excitement was intense. The largest crowd that has visited Franklin Field during the present season was on hand to witness the fray, fully 20,000 persons passing through the gates."

The first quarter was scoreless. Late in the second period, Pitt end James Herron "appeared in the limelight when he fell upon a fumble on the Penn 45-yard line. From this point Pitt steamed up the offense and on lateral and double passing, the backfield men reached the five-yard line. Here Penn made a gallant stand. (Andy) Hastings tore around tackle to within a foot of the goal line, but Ted Fry was twice repulsed on smashes into the center of the line. Finally, Hastings went past Harris for touchdown. Fry kicked the goal." Pitt led 7–0 at the end of the half.

"As in the opening period, neither goal line was crossed in the third quarter." Mid-fourth quarter Pitt gained possession on the Penn 44-yard line. James Morrow, James DeHart and Ted Fry advanced the ball to the Penn 4-yard line. "On the next play DeHart started to dash around the Penn right flank. While going at top speed DeHart fumbled, but without losing his speed, bent forward and gobbled up the bounding ball on a rebound. He flashed across the goal line for the second touchdown. Fry kicked the resultant goal and the Pitt rooters went wild."

Penn scored with less than two minutes left in the game. James Morrow fumbled on the Pitt 16-yard line and Ross recovered for Penn. Two running plays advanced the ball to the 2-yard line. After five plays and two penalties, "Williams sped around Pitt's left end for a touchdown, making it on the last down. Bell kicked the goal." Final Score: Pitt 14 to Penn 7.

The Pitt lineup for the game against Penn was H. Clifford Carlson and Thomas Beattie (left end), Claude Thornhill and Leonard Hilty (left tackle), Isadore Shapira and John Sutherland (left guard), Bob Peck (center), Randall Soppitt (right guard), Carl Hockensmith (right tackle), James Herron (right end), Guy Williamson and Eric Meadows (quarterback), Andy Hastings, James Morrow, and Joe Matson(left halfback), James DeHart and William McClelland (right halfback) and George Fry (fullback). The game was played in 15-minute quarters.

The Evening Ledger contained insightful commentary concerning the Penn versus Pitt game:

"Perhaps the greatest feature connected with the Penn-Pitt game was the wonderful drawing ability of Warner's team. When Pitt was scheduled by the Penn management it was considered doubtful whether or not it would be a good attraction, and the western Pennsylvanians got the date more because the negotiations with another team fell through. The Pitt athletic authorities argued that they would draw a large crowd; but the size of the gathering at Franklin Field Saturday was far beyond the hopes of both institutions. There were more than 17,000 persons at the game, and it was the second largest crowd in five years. There was not a person present who did not vote it a great game. Pitt has proved itself a worthy foe, and one which can attract the spectators, and there is no reason why this game cannot be made a great event between eastern and western Pennsylvania each season."

=== Allegheny ===
Week 5: Allegheny at Pitt

Team	1	2	3	4	Total
Allegheny	7	0	0	0	7
• Pitt	14	14	0	14	42

- Date: October 30, 1915
- Location: Forbes Field
  Pittsburgh, PA
- Referee: James J. Cosgrove (Cornell)

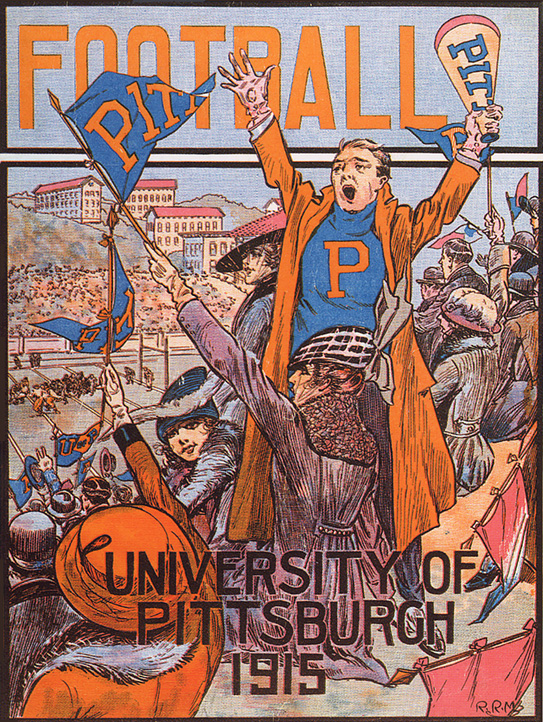
1915 sixth annual Pitt football yearbook used as game program

The Allegheny College Methodists from Meadville, PA were Pitt's opponent on the last Saturday in October. The Methodists were led by third year coach Charles Hammett. Coach Hammett led the Methodists to an undefeated 1914 season and his 1915 edition was 3–1 prior to the Pitt game, having lost to Carnegie Tech.

Pitt came out of the Penn game with no major injuries and "the return of the freshmen members of the squad to active participation in the Allegheny game means that Pitt can utilize her entire list of candidates again."

The Meadville Evening Republican reported: "As was generally predicted the University of Pittsburgh football team proved too strong for the Allegheny College team in the game at Pittsburgh Saturday and the latter team was defeated by a score of 42 to 7. Allegheny was strong in its forward passing and, after the one touchdown was made, the Meadville team twice worked its way right up to the Pitt threshold by means of the aerial attack. In the third quarter Allegheny had possession of the ball the greater part of the time on account of its adeptness in hurling it through space. Allegheny was outclassed, however, in running the ends and bucking the line, and was unable to do a thing with Pitt's forwards."

The 1917 Owl Yearbook gave the best recap: "Allegheny's spectacular aerial attack caused Pitt all sorts of trouble, and gave fans something to worry about before the Wash-Jeff game. The Methodists scored a touchdown early in the session, and bothered the University defense on other occasions. Panther^ power and punch proved a fine counter-irritant, however, and Allegheny was soon snowed under."

Richard Guy of The Gazette Times urged caution: "The University of Pittsburgh achieved a comparatively easy football victory over Allegheny College yesterday on the Forbes Field gridiron, 42 to 7, but at the same time was shown that the passing game is a feat which the local eleven must master before it will be able to cope with W. & J. or any other team which employs it."

Pitt scored six touchdowns. Guy Williamson and Andy Hastings each scored two. James DeHart and Ted Fry each tallied once. Ted Fry "kicked six goals after touchdowns, one being at a rather difficult angle." "Williamson made two of the most thrilling dashes ever witnessed in this city." The first was a 65-yard punt return three minutes into the game. "The Pitt captain received the pigskin on his own 35-yard line and by sensational dodging and the superb interference of his teammates, ran the remaining distance to Allegheny's goal line. The second thriller came in the second quarter when, on a kick formation, "Chalky" eluded tackler after tackler and ran 62 yards for a touchdown."

"The only touchdown Allegheny made was early in the game when Cox threw to Scannell for a 20-yard gain across the goal line. Williamson apparently had Scannell covered, but he got free and received the ball back of the line." Allegheny finished their season with a 5–3 record.

The Pitt lineup for the game against Allegheny was Dale Sies, H. Clifford Carlson and William Harrington (left end), Claude Thornhill, Leonard Hilty and Joe Trees Jr. (left tackle), John Sutherland, Fred Siemon, Isadore Shapira and James Bond Jr. (left guard), Bob Peck and Thomas Kendrick Jr. (center), Randall Soppitt, James McQuiston and Edward Stahl (right guard), Carl Hockensmith and Ralph Cliquennoi (right tackle), James Herron, O. C. Ammons, and Thomas Beattie (right end), Guy Williamson and Eric Meadows (quarterback), Andy Hastings, Roscoe Gougler and James Morrow (left halfback), James DeHart, Frank McNulty and Henry Stahlman (right halfback) and Ted Fry and William McClelland (fullback). The game was played in 15-minute quarters.

^ The Panther was designated the university animal in autumn of 1909 and this seems to be the first publication that referred to the Pitt team as Panthers.

=== Washington & Jefferson ===
Week 6: Washington & Jefferson at Pitt

Team	1	2	3	4	Total
W. & J.	0	0	0	0	0
• Pitt	0	0	19	0	19

- Date: November 6, 1915
- Location: Forbes Field
  Pittsburgh, PA
- Game start: 2:30 p.m.
- Game attendance: 40,000
- Referee: D. W. Merriman (Geneva)

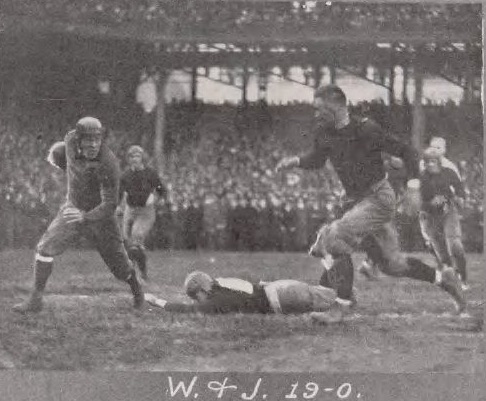
1915 Pitt versus Wash-Jeff football game action

On November 6, the Red and Black of Washington & Jefferson College led by coach Bob Folwell and sporting a 5–0–1 record arrived at Forbes Field to try and defeat the Pitt eleven for the 12th time in 16 tries. "Folwell reports his charges in splendid shape physically and mentally. By the latter he means the men know their plays." "Every man is in perfect physical condition, and if W. & J. does not win it will not be lack of proper training. My players will fight to the last ditch and I know that the Red and Black supporters will not be ashamed of their playing, whichever way it goes."

"The Pitt team will go on the field in shape. Of course the Gold and Blue warriors will miss halfback William Miller and fullback George McLaren, but neither was slated to start the game".

Ralph S. Davis of The Pittsburg Press noted: "While 35,000 frenzied enthusiasts yelled themselves hoarse, the University of Pittsburgh yesterday at Forbes Field won the football championship of Western Pennsylvania, defeating W. & J's strong eleven by the decisive score of 19–0."

Florent Gibson with The Pittsburgh Sunday Post showed his usual flair: "After three arid years, Pitt's cup of joy is filled to the brim and running over. Forced to taste the bitter dregs of defeat for three successive seasons, the Blue and Gold drank deep of the magic potion of success yesterday. And it's all the sweeter because it was a drink earned in as tough and enduring struggle that ever has graced a gridiron."

"The University team went into the contest with the definite orders not to try anything in the first half. The scheme was to play it safe. Wash & Jeff's forward passing was to be solved and their weak points noted. The team entered the second half ready and under orders to launch their long expected attack." "The break came three minutes after the kickoff for the commencement of the period. Pitt got its running attack under way, and Red Hastings, tearing through the left flank of the Red and Black team, sped down the field for 59 yards for touchdown. Ted Fry kicked the resultant goal." Pitt led 7 to 0. Then W. & J. advanced the ball into Pitt territory "to within the shadows of the Pitt goal line when Stobbs fumbled. James Herron, the big end, picked up the ball and sped down the field along the east sidelines for touchdown. Pitt adherents were in a state of joy." Pitt led 13 to 0, as the goal kick was not attempted. Pitt kicked into the end zone and W. & J. started on the 20-yard line. On second down, "Sutherland, a giant guard, intercepted a forward pass" and "stepped back to the 13 before he could be brought to earth." Hastings carried it a foot from pay dirt and "Ted Fry jabbed the center of the rush line, and Pitt had made its third touchdown." Then "Fry missed his first goal from touchdown in his last 18 attempts" but Pitt led 19 to 0. "That ended the scoring as neither team negotiated a point in the fourth period."

The Pitt lineup for the game against Washington & Jefferson was H. Clifford Carlson (left end), Claude Thornhill (left tackle), John Sutherland and Dale Sies (left guard), Bob Peck (center), Randall Soppitt (right guard), Carl Hockensmith (right tackle), James Herron (right end), Guy Williamson (quarterback), Andy Hastings (left halfback), James DeHart and Frank McNulty (right halfback), and Ted Fry (fullback). The game was played in 15 minute quarters.

=== Carnegie Tech ===
Week 7: Carnegie Tech at Pitt

Team	1	2	3	4	Total
Carnegie Tech	0	0	0	0	0
• Pitt	7	7	14	0	28

- Date: November 13, 1915
- Location: Forbes Field
  Pittsburgh, PA
- Game start: 2:30 p.m.
- Referee: William F. Knox (Yale)

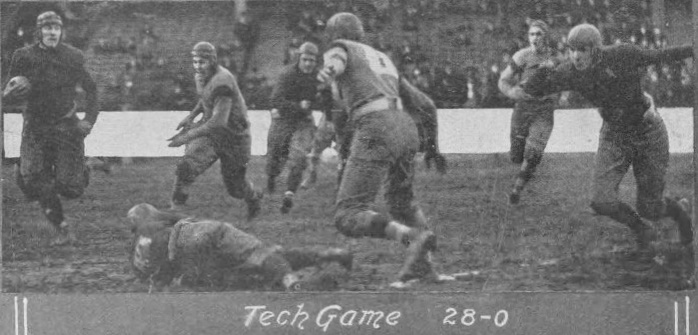
1915 Carnegie Tech game action

On November 13, Carnegie Tech and Pitt squared off for the sixth time in front of 10,000 spectators. For the second week in a row the Pitt eleven faced an unbeaten team. Carnegie Coach Walter Steffen's lads were 6–0 and would finish the season 7–1 in his second season at the helm. "Tech's determination to make a showing at the expense of an eleven recognized as one of the greatest in the country is commendable. Tech will present a lineup that's not quite the regular one. Ex-captain McCaughey will be in place of McFeaters, the big tackle who was disabled in the Case game, and Kelly will play McCaughey's guard."

"Pitt will be minus the services of tackle (Claude) Thornhill and fullback (Ted) Fry today, and, though their places will be filled by acceptable men, it is feared that the substitutions may throw the machine a trifle out of gear." After the Wash-Jeff game, it is natural that there should be a let down, "but the supporters are firm in their belief that Warner will have some special treatment, well adapted to the foiling of Tech's ambition up his sleeve for this afternoon's imbroglio, and will bring his eleven off victorious."

"The cheering of the rival students bodies started a half hour before game time and those who came early were well repaid. Several hundred Boy Scouts, headed by a brass band, attended the game as guests of the University of Pittsburgh. For the majority it was their first big football game and judging from the noise they made, every minute of the struggle was thoroughly enjoyed by the little fellows."

W. B. McVicker of The Pittsburgh Press gushed: "Outclassed and outplayed in every department of the game, out fighting for every inch of ground, Carnegie Tech's gridiron warriors went down to defeat, 28 to 0, yesterday afternoon at Forbes Field before Glenn Warner's Pitt eleven, conceded to be one of the strongest football teams in the United States, today."

The Gazette Times reported: "The offense of the Carnegie Tech team was not strong enough to cope with the defense of the Pitt representatives yesterday afternoon at Forbes Field and the result was that the Plaid was beaten in its annual football game with the Gold and Blue, 28 to 0."

"Of the 28 points scored by the Gold and Blue machine, (Andy) Hastings is credited with 22, having scored three touchdowns and kicked four goals following touchdowns. George McLaren made the only other score of the game." In the first quarter, "Hastings received the ball on Tech's 33 yard line and his interference enabled him to escape the line of scrimmage, but at the outside he met the secondary defense awaiting him. Altdoerfer made a grasp for him, but Hastings evaded the outstretched paws. Finley dashed at him but was tricked. Kesner stood between him and the goal posts but the Kiski product eluded the Plaid general with a squirm. The other tallies were marked up from bucks through the line with the ball in scoring distance."

The Pitt lineup for the game against Carnegie Tech was H. Clifford Carlson and Thomas Beattie (left end), Leonard Hilty and Dale Sies (left tackle), John Sutherland and James Bond Jr. (left guard), Bob Peck and Isadore Shapira (center), Randall Soppitt (right guard), Carl Hockensmith and Fred Seidel (right tackle), James Herron and William Harrington (right end), Guy Williamson and Eric Meadows (quarterback), Andy Hastings and Roscoe Gougler (left halfback), James DeHart, Frank McNulty and Henry Stahlman (right halfback) and George McLaren and William McClelland (fullback). The game was played in 15-minute quarters.

=== Penn State ===
Week 8: Penn State at Pitt

Team	1	2	3	4	Total
Penn State	0	0	0	0	0
• Pitt	10	0	7	3	20

- Date: November 25, 1915
- Location: Forbes Field
  Pittsburgh, PA
- Game start: 2:30 p.m.
- Game attendance: 17,000
- Referee: J. A. Evans (Williams)

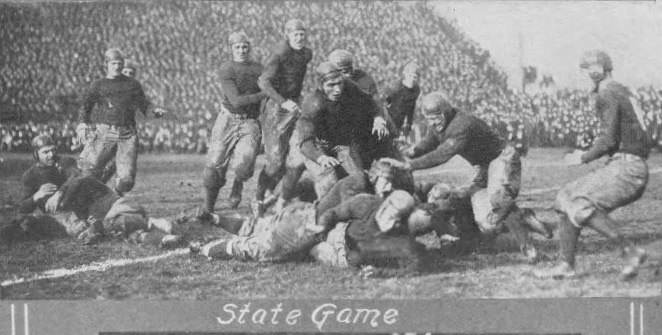
1915 Pitt versus Wash-Jeff football game action

On Thanksgiving Day, November 25, 1915, the University of Pittsburgh football team was playing for the Championship of Pennsylvania and possibly the National Title against the once beaten Penn State Nittany Lions led by first year coach Dick Harlow. The only blemish on their resume was a 13 to 0 loss to Harvard. Penn State was on a two-game losing streak to Pitt for the first time in the series history. On the eve of the game Coach Harlow told The Gazette Times: "I am not claiming victory, but I do claim that you will see a fighting team opposing Pitt tomorrow at Forbes Field and the fighting bunch will be representing Penn State. He added that his team is in splendid condition."

Coach Warner altered Pitt's starting backfield. "Eric Meadows will in all probability be at quarterback. Captain Williamson will be at right halfback with (Andy) Red Hastings at left halfback and George McLaren at fullback. Bob Peck will start at center in the Pitt line".

The Gazette Times noted: "If Pitt comes through with a win this afternoon the University will be permanent possessor of the Spalding Trophy, which has been won by the Blue and Gold during the past two years. State won the trophy previously offered but has yet to secure a leg on the present prize." And Richard Guy added: "Most prominent among the spectators will be a party of visitors from Japan. The party is headed by Baron Shibusawa, and includes some 10 or 12 of Japan's notables in commercial and public life." They are guests of the Chamber of Commerce and will be accompanied to the game by H. J. Heinz.

The Pittsburgh Post reported: "While 30,000 breathless folks looked on, ...the Blue and Gold gridders exploded with a loud report. They opened fire with all their batteries and, silencing the not inconsiderable heavy artillery of Penn State, totted up 20 points to none. Pitt's high explosive guns rent the Blue and White defense apart time after time and achieved a notable victory in a contest that, as a desperate and well-played struggle, will rank ahead of any game played hereabout in many seasons."

Richard Guy of The Gazette Times weighed in: "Pitt defeated Penn State in their annual football game at Forbes Field yesterday afternoon in such an impressive manner that there was little room to doubt the genuineness of the Pitt claim to championship honors for the year. At the conclusion of the game yesterday at Forbes Field Dick Harlow, the Penn State coach, sought out Floyd Rose in the Pitt dressing room, and said: "My team played just as well today as it did at Harvard. I have no excuse to offer, but I do want to say that the Pitt team this afternoon was much stronger than was Harvard the day we lost to it. I think we were beaten by the best team in the land today."

Andy Hastings again was the star. "His first successful placement kick of the season was registered early in the tussle and that score broke the ice. Later on he annexed the two touchdowns and kicked both goals, amassing in all a total of 17 points, enough to have him stand out as a prominent figure in the melee." Roscoe Gougler "kicked a neat field goal to show his appreciation of the opportunity."

Pitt earned 14 first downs held the Nittanies to 4. Pitt gained 315 yards and held State to 95. Penn State was only able to complete one pass out of ten attempts against the Pitt defense.

The 1917 Owl Yearbook praised the victory: "For the third year in succession Pitt showed itself master over State in what was without question the finest engagement of the whole year."

The Pittsburgh Press noted: "Coach Warner said today:"I have nothing but praise for the members of my team. Our success was due primarily to the grand spirit displayed by the boys, and the manner in which they worked together. I knew the moment I saw the material that I had the best team in the land, and the boys' achievements on the gridiron have verified my opinion."

The Pitt lineup for the game against Penn State was H. Clifford Carlson and Dale Sies (left end), Claude Thornhill and Leonard Hilty (left tackle), John Sutherland (left guard), Bob Peck and Isadore Shapira (center), Randall Soppitt (right guard), Carl Hockensmith (right tackle), James Herron and Thomas Beattie (right end), Eric Meadows and James DeHart (quarterback), Andy Hastings and Roscoe Gougler (left halfback), Guy Williamson and Frank McNulty (right halfback) and Geortge McLaren and Ted Fry (fullback). The game was played in 15-minute quarters.

== Scoring summary ==
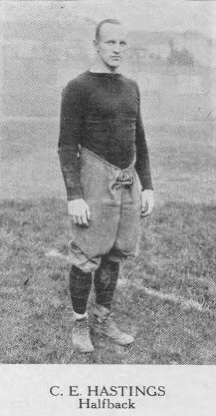
Andy Hastings

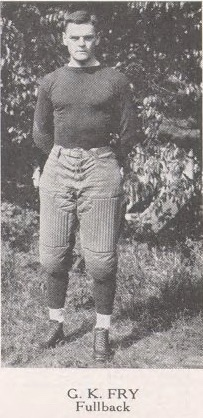
George Fry

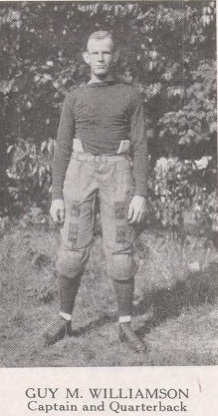
Guy Williamson

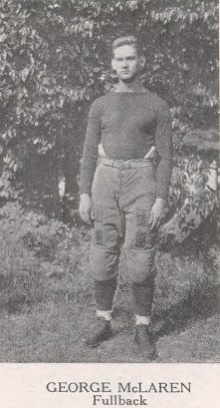
George McLaren

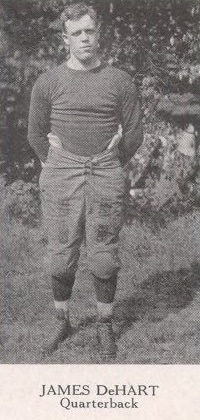
James DeHart

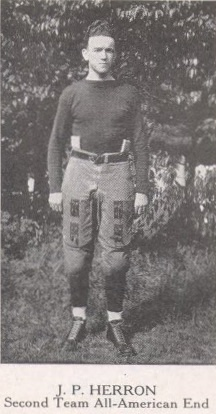
James Herron

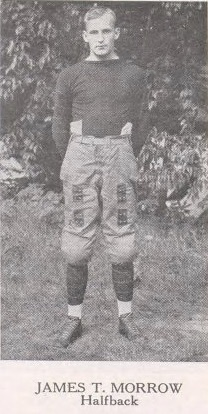
James Morrow

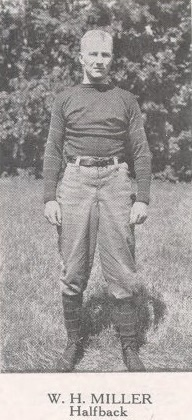
William Miller

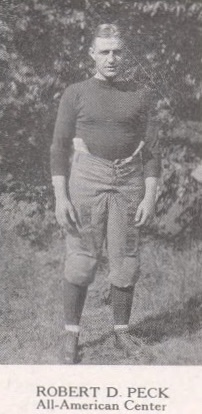
Bob Peck

1915 Pittsburgh Panthers scoring summary
Player	Touchdowns	Extra points	Field goals	Safety	Points
Andy Hastings	11	7	1	0	76
George Fry	4	16	0	0	40
Guy Williamson	6	1	0	0	37
George McClaren	4	0	0	0	24
James DeHart	3	0	0	0	18
James Herron	3	0	0	0	18
Roscoe Gougler	1	2	2	0	14
James Morrow	1	0	0	0	6
Leonard Hilty	1	0	0	0	6
William Miller	1	0	0	0	6
Bob Peck	0	2	0	0	2
Totals	35	28	3	0	247

== Postseason ==
Warner's impact was immediate. Led by center Robert Peck, Pitt's first First Team All-American, and All-American end James Pat Herron, the 1915 Pitt team went 8–0, shutting out five opponents and outscoring opponents by a combined 247–19. In 1933, the team was retrospectively selected by football historian Parke H. Davis as that season's co-national champion, along with Cornell.

Robert Peck was elected captain of the 1916 team at the conclusion of the Penn State game.

Since the foregone conclusion was that Cornell would be declared the Eastern Champions, Joseph H.Thompson, Chairman of the Pitt Football Committee sent a telegram to Cornell suggesting a postseason game: "In deference to the sentiment among ye football-loving public, which would like to see the football supremacy of the East decided, the University of Pittsburgh is willing to play Cornell within two weeks on neutral grounds, say in Philadelphia or New York, each team to pay its own expenses and the entire proceeds to be devoted to some deserving charity. Please advise."

The Cornell manager immediately wired: "Cornell season closed."

The Pitt Weekly was not enthralled with the idea: "We feel that this was an unfortunate occurrence and no positive good can result from it. It was a foregone conclusion that Cornell would not accept the challenge under any circumstances. Coming when it did, naturally, the Big Red athletes had broken training, and as Coach Sharpe said, with considerable effect, "Football is not everything at Cornell." The challenge puts Pittsburgh in the opposite light. We are begging to be allowed the try at the laurel not they. We believe that our athletics should be free from any such taint of caucus methods. And we resent the insinuation that "Football is everything at Pittsburgh."

"From the first to last, from the time Collingswood and his assistants left Pittsburgh, late in August, to get Camp Hamilton in shape to receive visitors, to that last day in November when the Blue and Gold athletes followed "Chalky" (Williamson) off the gridiron, the 1915 season was a thing of beauty and a joy forever. "A season without regrets," Warner called it; and he ought to know. Of the lettermen of 1915, Williamson, Hockensmith, Shapira and Beattie will not return. Their places will be hard to fill, but Coach Warner will have on hand plenty of reserve material from which another strong machine may be developed."

== List of national championship selectors ==
The 1915 team was selected or recognized as national champions by multiple selectors, of which only Parke H. Davis's selection is recognized as "major" (i.e. national in scope) by the official NCAA football records book. College Football Data Warehouse also recognizes Pitt as co-national champion in 1915.

Among the 27 selectors who chose nine teams retrospectively as national champions for 1915, these determined Pitt to be national champions.

- Bill Libby
- Jim Koger
- Mel Smith
- Parke H. Davis*

Koger, Smith and Davis also selected undefeated Cornell, as did 13 other selectors.

* A "major" selector that was "national in scope" according to the official NCAA football records book.

== All-American selections ==
- **Bob Peck**, center (College Football Hall of Fame inductee) (1st team Collier's Weekly as selected by Walter Camp; 1st team Frank G. Menke, Sporting Editor of the International News Service; 1st team Monty, New York sports writer Monty; 1st team Parke H. Davis; 1st team Tommy Clark)
- Andy Hastings, Pittsburgh (2nd team Frank G. Menke))
- James Pat Herron, end (2nd team Walter Camp)

*Bold - Consensus All-American
