= Antwone Fisher (film) =

2002 film by Denzel Washington

- Theatrical release poster
- Directed by: Denzel Washington
- Written by: Antwone Fisher
- Based on: Finding Fish by Antwone Fisher
- Produced by: Todd Black; Randa Haines; Denzel Washington
- Starring: Derek Luke; Joy Bryant; Denzel Washington
- Cinematography: Philippe Rousselot
- Edited by: Conrad Buff
- Music by: Mychael Danna
- Production companies: Fox Searchlight Pictures; Antwone Fisher Productions
- Distributed by: 20th Century Fox
- Release dates: September 12, 2002 (TIFF); December 19, 2002 (United States)
- Running time: 120 minutes
- Country: United States
- Language: English
- Budget: $12.5 million
- Box office: $23.4 million

Antwone Fisher is a 2002 American biographical drama film directed by and starring Denzel Washington in his film directorial debut. Washington stars in the film as the psychiatrist Jerome Davenport, alongside Derek Luke in the title role; Luke personally knew the real Antwone Fisher prior to being cast. The film marked Luke's Hollywood debut. Joy Bryant also appears, playing Fisher's girlfriend.

The film is inspired by a true story, with the real Antwone Fisher credited as the screenwriter and is based on his autobiographical book Finding Fish. The film was produced by Todd Black, Randa Haines, and Washington and features a soundtrack by Mychael Danna.

Black was first inspired to make the film upon hearing the story from Fisher, who was then working as a security guard at Sony Pictures Studios.

== Plot ==
Antwone "Fish" Fisher is a temperamental young man from Cleveland, Ohio, with a violent history who is serving in the U.S. Navy. His father was killed before he was born and his teenage mother, Eva Mae Fisher, ended up arrested soon after and put in jail, where she gave birth to him. He was then placed in an orphanage until she was released and could claim him. Since she had not yet claimed him, at the age of two Antwone was placed in a foster home run by a couple, Mr. and Mrs. Tate. Antwone suffers years of physical and emotional abuse at Mrs. Tate's hands and is molested by her adult niece Nadine. He finally leaves the home at age 14. After living out on the streets for the next few years, he decides to join the U.S. Navy to make something out of his life.

The rough life he had as a child has caused him to have a violent temper; after getting into a fight with a fellow sailor, Antwone is sentenced at a captain's mast to be demoted, fined, and restricted to the ship for 45 days. His commanding officer also orders him to go to psychiatric treatment. Antwone goes in to meet Dr. Jerome Davenport, who attempts to get him to open up. Antwone is at first extremely resistant, but gradually comes to trust Davenport and opens up about his traumatic childhood. Meanwhile, Antwone develops feelings for fellow Navy sailor Cheryl. With Antwone still getting into altercations, Davenport tries to explore his feelings for Cheryl in order to channel Antwone's feelings into something positive. Antwone finally goes on a date with Cheryl and establishes a relationship with her.

While on leave in Mexico, Antwone gets into a fight with a sailor who insinuates that he is gay and is thrown into jail. Davenport meets him in jail, where Antwone confides the sexual abuse he suffered as a child. Antwone eventually reveals to Cheryl that he sees a psychiatrist.

At a Thanksgiving dinner, Davenport advises Antwone to find his real family. Antwone refuses, but thanks Davenport before inviting him to a graduation ceremony. Following the graduation ceremony, Davenport tells Antwone that he's ending the sessions and feels Antwone needs to progress on his own. Antwone breaks down, feeling everyone has abandoned him. He reveals his best friend Jesse was killed while attempting a robbery, and that he resents Jesse for leaving him behind. Realizing he needs to find his parents to find closure, Antwone asks Cheryl to go with him to Cleveland. After a dead end at social services, Antwone decides to return to the Tate household. There he confronts Nadine and Mrs. Tate about their abuse. Mrs. Tate ultimately reveals Antwone's father's name: Edward Elkins.

After looking through multiple telephone books, Antwone comes into contact with his aunt Annette and visits her. Antwone learns his mother lives nearby and goes to visit her. Antwone finds closure, forgives her, and leaves. When he returns to the Elkins household, he finds a feast prepared for him and finds the family he lost.

Antwone visits Davenport and thanks him for everything. Davenport then replies that it is he who should be thanking Antwone. Davenport confesses that he had been failing to deal with his own problems - particularly that he and his wife were unable to have children, and that treating Antwone prompted him to finally confront his demons. The film draws to a close as Davenport and Antwone go to eat.

== Cast ==
- Derek Luke as Ship's Serviceman Third Class/Seaman Antwone "Fish" Fisher
  - Malcolm David Kelley as Antwone Fisher (age 7)
  - Cory Hodges as Antwone Fisher (age 14)
- Denzel Washington as Lt. Cmdr. Dr. Jerome Davenport
- Joy Bryant as Petty Officer Second Class Cheryl Smolley
- Salli Richardson as Berta Davenport
- Leonard Earl Howze as Pork Chop
- Kente Scott as Kansas City
- Kevin Connolly as Slim
- Rainoldo Gooding as Grayson
- Novella Nelson as Mrs. Tate
- Stephen Snedden as Berkley
- Leo Nepomuceno as SP #1
- Sung Kang as Davenport's receptionist
- Cordell Stokes as Keith
- Ellis Williams as Reverend Tate
- Timothy Reddick as Dwight
- Yolonda Ross as Nadine Tate
- De'Angelo Wilson as Jesse (age 19)
  - Jascha Washington as Jesse (age 8)
- Vernee Watson-Johnson as Annette Elkins
- Viola Davis as Eva May
- Andre Patton as Kenny
- Doug Jewell as Spinoza
- Jenifer Lewis as Aunt Mary Williams (uncredited cameo)

== Finding Fish ==
Finding Fish is an autobiographical account written by Antwone Fisher upon which the movie was based. The film generally follows the plot of the novel. However, the book proceeds in a linear fashion while the movie is explained through various flashbacks. The movie stresses Antwone's relationship with his doctor, whereas the book chronicles Antwone's entire life.

== Production ==
In his novel Finding Fish, Antwone Fisher explains he took a free screenwriting class at Bethel A.M.E. Church after a chance encounter with a limo driver. The class was taught by Chris Smith, who delivered an introduction to a producer named Todd Black. Black was impressed with Fisher's story. Black reviewed the script for a week and told Fisher that though he couldn't make a deal, he wanted to hire him full-time as a screenwriter. Fisher wrote 41 drafts until the script was sold by Black to 20th Century Fox, who ultimately released it under their Fox Searchlight Pictures banner. The film marks the directorial debut of Denzel Washington, the first screenwriting credit for Antwone Fisher, and the first feature film role for Derek Luke. Washington was brought the script originally just to play the part of Jerome Davenport. But Washington's agent called Black and told him he not only wanted to act in the film, he wanted it to be his directorial debut.

Fisher had known Luke as a young actor working at the Sony Pictures gift shop while he was writing the screenplay. Fisher encouraged Luke to try out for the part. An audition with casting director Robi Reed-Humes went well enough that Luke was called in to meet with Washington. Washington was impressed with Luke's audition and asked that he personally deliver the good news. Though Luke had no prior film credits, Washington wanted to give a younger generation of black actors the opportunity to break through. To prepare the cast, Washington required all the principal cast members to know his or her character's history and story inside out before coming to the set, telling cast and crew, "We’re doing it for Antwone."

Inspired by Fisher's story, the filmmakers sought to give back to the communities that supported them during the shoot. In the Cleveland neighborhood where scenes of Fisher's youth and homecoming were shot, the filmmakers renovated and reinforced structures like the apartment building where Eva Mae's character lives. Members of the community were hired to work on the production, and Washington personally met with these people and offered his thanks for their help.

Filming took place in September 2001.

== The Slave Community ==
The book The Slave Community, written by American historian John W. Blassingame and referenced in the film, was one of the first historical studies of slavery in the United States. The book contradicted others which suggested that African American slaves were largely submissive. Blassingame used psychology to determine the mentality developed by slaves during the era and possibly passed on to generations after.

Davenport suggests that Antwone read the book to understand why Mrs. Tate abused him. Davenport does not intend to justify her actions, but he seeks to help Antwone understand where her mentality of beatings and verbal abuse to keep the foster children subservient came from. Antwone is seen briefly reading the book in the next scene.

== Reception ==
=== Author's reaction to the film ===
When I saw the film for the first time, I was overwhelmed by a mixture of feelings: fear, joy, pride and satisfaction—all of which still linger, and I am certain they will for the rest of my life. I hope others, too, walk away with those same feelings and the courage to do something to better the lives of children in general. I hope that after seeing the movie and reading my memoir that people will see that every child has value and boundless potential and that even if all one has to give is an encouraging word as a genuine gesture of care. ... that gift alone can save a child's life and give hope for the future.

— Antwone Fisher

=== Critical response ===
Review aggregate website Rotten Tomatoes reports 77% of critics reviewed the film positively, based on 148 reviews. The website's critic consensus says, "Washington's directing debut is a solidly crafted, emotionally touching work." Metacritic gave the movie a score of 62 based on 30 reviews, indicating "generally favorable" reviews. Audiences polled by CinemaScore gave the film a rare "A+" grade.

Praise was given especially towards Washington's directing and Luke's performance. Moira Macdonald of The Seattle Times wrote, "There's a simplicity and heart to Antwone Fisher, Denzel Washington's directing debut, that's extremely appealing; the emotional wallop of the movie sneaks up on you, despite its entirely predictable trajectory."

== Awards ==
Year	Ceremony	Category	Nominee	Result
2002
2002	American Film Institute Awards	Top 10 Films of 2002	Antwone Fisher	Won
2002	National Board of Review Awards	Breakthrough Performance	Derek Luke	Won
2002	Producers Guild of America Awards	Stanley Kramer Award	Denzel Washington	Won
2002	Producers Guild of America Awards	Stanley Kramer Award	Todd Black	Won
2002	Writers Guild of America Awards	Best Original Screenplay	Antwone Fisher	Nominated
2003
2003	Black Reel Awards	Best Film	Antwone Fisher	Won
2003	Black Reel Awards	Best Director	Denzel Washington	Won
2003	Black Reel Awards	Best Actor	Derek Luke	Won
2003	Black Reel Awards	Best Supporting Actor	Denzel Washington	Nominated
2003	Black Reel Awards	Best Supporting Actress	Joy Bryant	Nominated
2003	Black Reel Awards	Best Screenplay, Adapted or Original	Antwone Fisher	Won
2003	Black Reel Awards	Best Breakthrough Performance	Derek Luke	Won
2003	Humanitas Prize	Feature Film	Antwone Fisher	Won
2003	Independent Spirit Awards	Best Male Lead	Derek Luke	Won
2003	Independent Spirit Awards	Best Supporting Female	Viola Davis	Nominated

== Bibliography ==
- Blassinggame, John W. (1979). The Slave Community: Plantation Life in the Antebellum South (Revised ed.). New York: Oxford University Press. ISBN 9780195025637.
- Fisher, Antwone Q.; Rivas, Mim E. (2001). Finding Fish: a Memoir. New York: William Morrow. ISBN 9780060007782.
- Fisher, Antwone (2002). Who Will Cry for the Little Boy?:Poems (1st ed.). New York: William Morrow. ISBN 9780060549329.
