= Derek Luke =

American actor

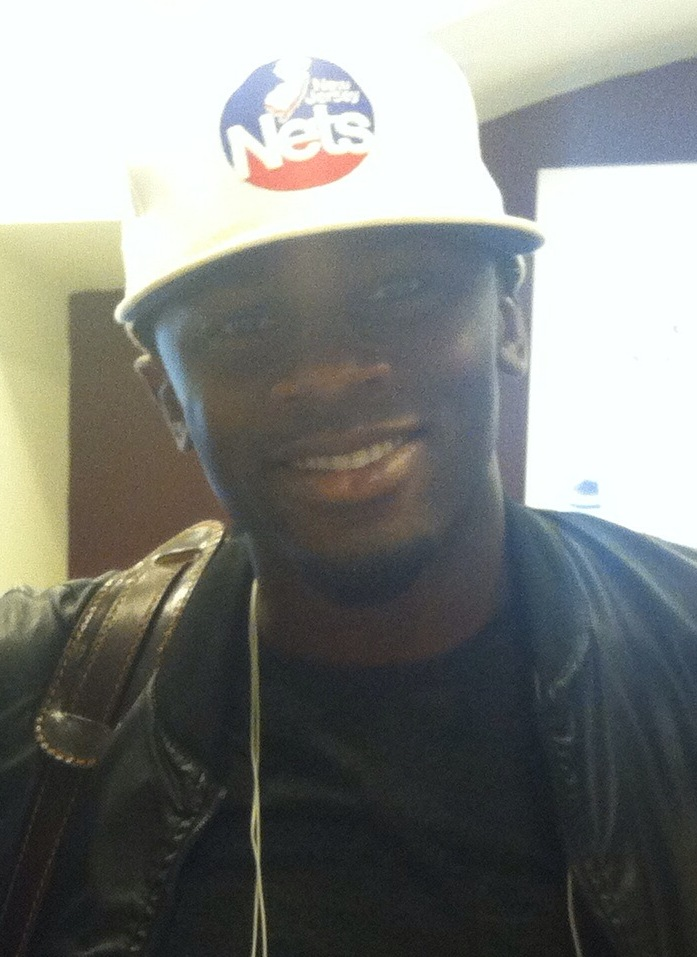
- Luke at Orlando, Florida in 2013
- Born: Derek Nathanial Luke; April 24, 1974 (age 52); Jersey City, New Jersey, U.S.
- Occupation: Actor
- Years active: 1999–present
- Spouse: Sophia Adella Luke (m. 1998)
- Children: 1

Derek Nathanial Luke (born April 24, 1974) is an American actor. He won the Independent Spirit Award for his big-screen debut performance as the titular character in the 2002 film Antwone Fisher, directed and produced by Denzel Washington. He is also known for his roles as Boobie Miles in Friday Night Lights (2004), Bobby Joe Hill in Glory Road (2006), Joshua Hardaway in Madea Goes to Jail (2009), Gabe Jones in Captain America: The First Avenger (2011), William Wright in Baggage Claim (2013), and Kevin Porter on the Netflix original series 13 Reasons Why (2017–2020).

== Early life ==
Luke was born in Jersey City, New Jersey, the son of Marjorie Dixon, a pianist, and Maurice Luke, a former actor. His father is from Georgetown, Guyana.

Derek attended Henry Snyder High School and graduated from Linden High School.

== Career ==
Luke played a small role as a nurse in the 1999 "White Collar" episode of the sitcom The King of Queens, and played one of the group members of Mayhem in the Moesha episode "Mayhem at the Jam Esp" (March 19, 2001).

Luke's breakout role was the title character in the Denzel Washington film Antwone Fisher. The 2002 film is about a sailor who must go to a psychiatrist for assistance with his childhood trauma, which is the source of his outbursts. As the story develops, he comes to terms with his past and starts a journey to find his family. The following year, he appeared alongside Laurence Fishburne as Kid in the 2003 film Biker Boyz. In this film Derek Luke plays the son of a mechanic who worked for a motorcycle racer known as Smoke. As the film develops Lukes's father in the film dies while an active off-the-grid race was taking place. Later the son begins to race and shows his talent, but Smoke denies a race with him. In retaliation he decided to create a motorcycle gang to rival Smoke's gang called “Biker Boyz” which starts a conflict. Luke subsequently played James 'Boobie' Miles in the 2004 film Friday Night Lights, Bobby Joe in the 2006 film Glory Road, and Sean 'Puffy' Combs in the 2009 film Notorious. He also played Alicia Keys' love interest in her music video for "Teenage Love Affair", and appeared as singer Monica's love interest in the music videos for "So Gone" and "Knock Knock".

In 2006, Luke starred as South African anti-apartheid activist Patrict Chamusso opposite Tim Robbins in Phillip Noyce's Catch a Fire. Luke prepared for the role in South Africa, learning Zulu and South African English. Luke played one of the four male leads in Spike Lee's 2008 war film Miracle at St. Anna, replacing Wesley Snipes, who had to leave the film due to his highly publicized tax problems.

Luke starred in the NBC series Trauma. He played Gabe Jones, a member of the Howling Commandos, in the 2011 Marvel Studios film Captain America: The First Avenger. In June 2011, he also began starring in the TNT original medical drama series Hawthorne as Miles Bourdet, an assistant surgeon from Chicago.

From February to April 2013, he played Gregory Thomas in the FX series The Americans. In 2015, he played Malcolm Devoe, head of security for Empire Entertainment and Cookie's secret love interest, on the TV series Empire. In March 2018, he was cast in the lead role of the NBC pilot Suspicion.

== Personal life ==
Luke has been married to actress Sophia Adella Luke since April 4, 1998. They have one son.

== Filmography ==
=== Film ===
Year	Title	Role	Notes
2002	Antwone Fisher	Antwone "Fish" Fisher	BET Award for Best Actor; Black Reel Award for Best Actor; Black Reel Award for Best Breakthrough Performance; Independent Spirit Award for Best Male Lead; National Board of Review Award for Best Male Breakthrough Performance; Satellite Award for Outstanding New Talent; Nominated—Chicago Film Critics Association Award for Most Promising Newcomer; Nominated—MTV Movie Award for Best Male Breakthrough Performance; Nominated—Teen Choice Award for Choice Breakout Movie Actor
2003	Pieces of April	Bobby	
2003	Biker Boyz	Kid	
2004	Spartan	Curtis	
2004	Friday Night Lights	Boobie Miles	
2006	Glory Road	Bobby Joe Hill	Hollywood Film Festival Award for Best Breakthrough Actor
2006	Catch a Fire	Patrick Chamusso	Nominated—Black Reel Award for Best Actor; Nominated—Satellite Award for Best Actor – Motion Picture Drama
2007	Lions for Lambs	Arian Finch	
2008	Definitely, Maybe	Russell T. McCormack	
2008	Miracle at St. Anna	2nd Staff Sgt. Aubrey Stamps	Nominated—Black Reel Award for Best Actor; Nominated—Image Award for Outstanding Actor in a Motion Picture
2009	Notorious	Sean "Puffy" Combs	
2009	Madea Goes to Jail	Joshua Hardaway	Nominated—Black Reel Award for Best Supporting Actor
2011	Captain America: The First Avenger	Gabe Jones	
2012	Seeking a Friend for the End of the World	Alan Speck	
2012	Sparkle	Stix	
2013	Baggage Claim	William Wright	
2014	Alex of Venice	Frank	
2014	Supremacy	Raymond	
2014	Sight Unseen	—N/a	
2015	Self/less	Anton	
2021	American Refugee	Greg Taylor	
2022	Alone Together	John	
2022	Darby and the Dead	Ben Harper	
2023	Rare Objects	Ben Winshaw	
2026	Michael	Johnnie Cochran	Scenes deleted

=== Television ===
Year	Title	Role	Notes
1999–2000	The King of Queens	Delivery Man / Orderly	2 episodes
2001	Moesha	Ruckus	Episode: "Mayhem at the Jam"
2009–2010	Trauma	Cameron Boone	20 episodes
2011	Hawthorne	Dr. Miles Bourdet	8 episodes
2013, 2018	The Americans	Gregory Thomas	4 episodes
2015	Empire	Malcolm DeVeaux	3 episodes
2015–2017	Rogue	Marlon Dinard	Series regular, 20 episodes
2016	Roots	Silla Ba Dibba	2 episodes
2017–2019	13 Reasons Why	Mr. Kevin Porter	Main cast (Seasons 1–2); Guest (Season 3); 27 episodes
2019	God Friended Me	Henry Chase	Episode; "Que Sera Sera"
2019	The Purge	Marcus Moore	Main; 10 episodes
2023	The Crossover	Chuck Bell	Main role
