= Boobie Miles =

American football player (born 1970)

James Earl "Boobie" Miles Jr. (born April 16, 1970) is an American former high school football running back for Permian High School in Odessa, Texas. He was a primary subject in the book Friday Night Lights: A Town, a Team, and a Dream by Buzz Bissinger, and the movie inspired by the book. Miles is a major figure in Bissinger's book as one of the top high school running backs in Texas. He was heavily recruited by dozens of top college football schools, but his promising career was derailed by a severe career ending ACL injury.

== Early life ==
Miles was born en route to St. Luke's Hospital in Houston with a police escort on April 16, 1970. He lived with his parents until he was three when his mother left him with his maternal grandmother in Houston and moved permanently to Oklahoma without him. Around the age of five, Miles went to live with his father, James Sr. The elder Miles was working two jobs, as a truck driver and printing-plant labourer which left Miles lonely for most of the time. His father lost custody of Boobie when he started dating a woman who, Boobie says, physically abused him. He was placed in a foster home in the Houston area and, eight months later, he was put in the care of his uncle L. V. Miles in Odessa, Texas. The two shared the house with L. V.'s wife, Ruby, and her three daughters.

Miles who was described as an overly energetic aggressive child, started playing football for the Vikings, a Pop Warner football team that L. V. coached.

== High school football career ==
In Miles’s junior year in 1987, he rushed for 1,345 yards. Expectations were high every year at Permian High School; in 1988, the Associated Press, in its preseason predictions, had chosen Permian to win the state title based partly on the play of Miles. From the spring through the early fall of '88, Miles was heavily recruited by numerous top football schools. Letters came from Notre Dame, Florida State University, University of Nebraska–Lincoln, University of Houston, Texas A&M, Clemson University, Texas Tech, University of Oklahoma, Oklahoma State, Louisiana State University (LSU), Southern Methodist University (SMU), University of Southern California (USC), Purdue University, and University of Arkansas. Despite these prestigious scholarship offers, Miles was an instant Proposition 48 case due to his academic struggles and would have had to miss his freshman season. The most impressive game of his football career happened against Abilene Cooper High School in which on only eight carries scored three touchdowns which were 62, 67 and 80 yards respectively and accumulated a total of 232 rushing yards. Unbeknownst to Miles, his estranged father James Sr. was sitting in the bleachers watching the game and was deeply impressed and burst into tears by his son’s athletic ability.

However, in a preseason scrimmage against the Amarillo Palo Duro Dons in Lubbock in front of many college scouts, Miles's leg was accidentally caught in the artificial turf when he planted his left leg to stiff-arm a tackler; another player then fell on it from the side. The next day, he was examined by a local doctor. The initial diagnosis of the injury was that it was only a sprained ligament and he would have been out for only a little bit. Four days later however, an orthopedic surgeon, Dr. Dean, examined Miles and felt the injury was severe enough to require immediate arthroscopic surgery. The surgery was performed the day before Permian's season opener against Austin High School. Miles had severely torn the anterior cruciate ligament. He had also torn the cartilage in his left knee. Miles was given the option of immediate reconstructive surgery, which Dean had recommended, or a program of rehabilitation. Rehab would allow Miles to play football with a knee brace. Both Boobie and L. V. opted for the brace which likely made his injury worse and Boobie later expressed regret for not getting immediate surgery.

Miles returned against Abilene High School, though he left the game limping with a cramp after only a handful of carries. The next week against Midland Lee High School, Permian lost, with Miles threatening to quit the team at halftime for his lack of playing time. Miles in anger quit the team the following Monday. In November 1988, Dean performed reconstructive surgery on his knee. After a long painful rehabilitation from the surgery, Miles lost much of the speed and agility that had made him a sought-after star running back and his prestigious scholarship offers were revoked.

=== Friday Night Lights ===
Miles was a key figure in Friday Night Lights: A Town, a Team, and a Dream, a 1990 book by H. G. Bissinger that followed the story of the 1988 Permian High Panthers football team as they made a run towards the Texas state championship. In 2002, Sports Illustrated named Friday Night Lights the fourth-greatest book ever written about sports.

A movie version of Friday Night Lights was made directed by Peter Berg and then released in the United States on October 6, 2004. It starred Billy Bob Thornton as Permian Coach Gary Gaines. Miles also had a non-speaking cameo in the film as a Permian assistant coach and was seen in many pivotal moments of the film. Boobie was played by Derek Luke who earned praise. The film was a box office and critical success and, in turn, spawned an NBC television series of the same name, which premiered on October 3, 2006 and ran for five seasons and was critically acclaimed winning many Emmy awards.

== Life after high school and subsequent legal troubles ==
After graduating from Permian, Miles received many scholarship offers to junior colleges and accepted a scholarship offer from Ranger College but was still haunted by what could have happened if he hadn’t been injured. Miles became the first freshman starting running back at Ranger college, but his speed and agility was absent due to his aggravated knee injury. He soon failed out of Ranger College after the 1989–90 academic year and then spent some time playing semi-professional football in Culpeper, Virginia, and working a series of odd jobs around Odessa. On November 29, 1998, Miles suffered a personal tragedy when his uncle L.V died of a heart attack at the age of 54. Miles has expressed regret over attempting to play on his injured knee before having immediate surgery to repair it.

In 2012, H.G. Bissinger published a 34-page afterword called After Friday Night Lights, which has Bissinger visiting with Miles and discussing their 25-year friendship.

In May 2011, Miles was charged with aggravated assault. Police said he struck his stepbrother repeatedly in the head with a beer bottle. He received a sentence of five years' deferred probation in district court. Miles was picked up on a probation violation and served five years in prison. He was released in January 2018.

Miles has four children who live in Midland with their mother. As of June 2018, Miles lived in Copperas Cove, Texas, with his wife, Becca, and was working for Jack Welch Recruiting. In January 2020, Miles was sentenced to five years in prison for a 1999 sexual assault.

In 2023, Miles was sentenced to 13 years in prison after an Ector County jury found him guilty of Failure to Comply With Sex Offender Registration Requirements.

== Legacy ==
In 2010, southern hip hop rapper/producer Big K.R.I.T. released a song entitled "Hometown Hero" on his mixtape Krit Wuz Here, in which he features quotes of Miles' from the movie Friday Night Lights. Big K.R.I.T., also released a song entitled "Boobie Miles" on his 2012 mixtape 4eva Na Day.

Miles is related to Super Bowl 50 MVP linebacker Von Miller.

Anthony Dixon, a former running back and special-teamer for the Buffalo Bills, is nicknamed "Boobie" in reference to Miles.

Miles Sanders, a running back, is also nicknamed "Boobie" in reference to Miles.

Several members of the 2023 Detroit Lions named his portrayal as the best fictional athlete of all time.
