= Grove City Premium Outlets =

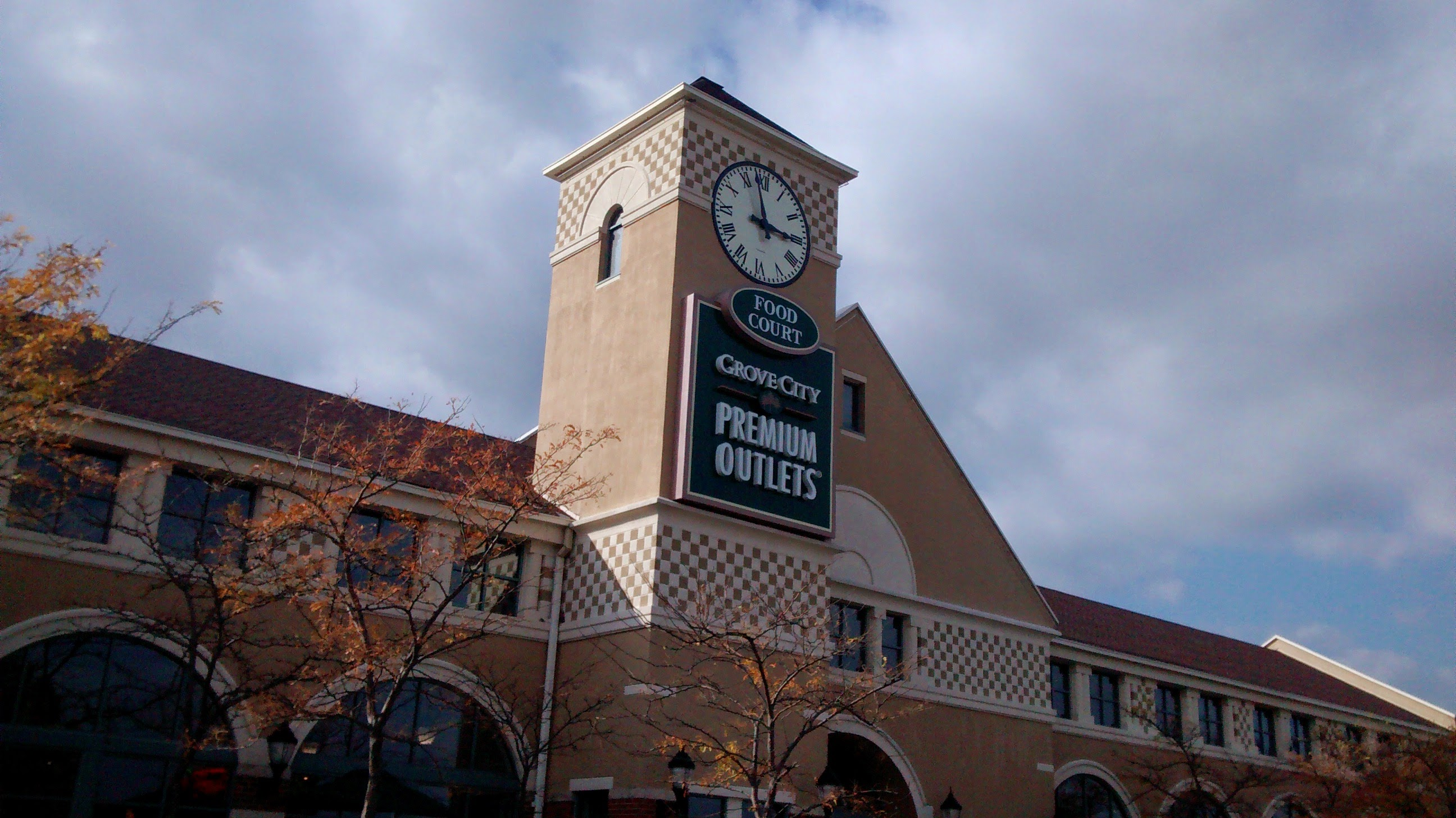
- Food court of the mall in 2014
- Location: Grove City, Pennsylvania, United States
- Coordinates: 41°8′22″N 80°9′26″W
- Opened: 1994
- Developer: Prime Outlets
- Manager: Simon Premium Outlets
- Owner: Simon Property Group
- Num. of stores: 99
- Floors: 1
- Website: www.premiumoutlets.com/outlet/grove-city

Grove City Premium Outlets, (formerly Prime Outlets-Grove City) is an open-air outlet mall, which is situated on Interstate 79, four miles south of its junction with Interstate 80, in Springfield Township, west of Grove City, Pennsylvania.

Located about sixty miles north of Pittsburgh and seventy miles south of Erie, Grove City Premium Outlets includes more than one hundred and thirty brand-name outlet stores, a food court, and one of the Pittsburgh Steelers' official team stores. It is one of the largest outlet malls in the United States.

== History ==
In 2002, it was announced that Grove City Outlet's parent company Prime Outlets, was struggling to stay out of debt.

In 2006, Value Retail News rated Prime Outlets in Grove City as one of the top twenty outlet centers in the United States. The outlets previously received the award in 2004.

On Black Friday in 2006, shoppers created a traffic jam 10 miles (16 km) long during the middle of the night on Interstate 79.

Due to Pennsylvania's lack of sales tax on clothing, many visitors to Grove City's outlets are from out-of-state or from Canada. A number of hotels are adjacent to the center.

In late August 2010, the center was acquired by Simon Property Group's Premium Outlet sector along with the majority of the Prime Outlet centers. It was then renamed Grove City Premium Outlets in September 2010.
