= William George Agency for Children's Services =

- Freeville, New York, U.S.

Information
- Former name: George Junior Republic
- Established: 1895; 131 years ago
- Gender: Mixed

The William George Agency for Children's Services (formerly the George Junior Republic) is a non-profit residential treatment center for adolescent boys and girls in Freeville, New York, United States.

== History ==
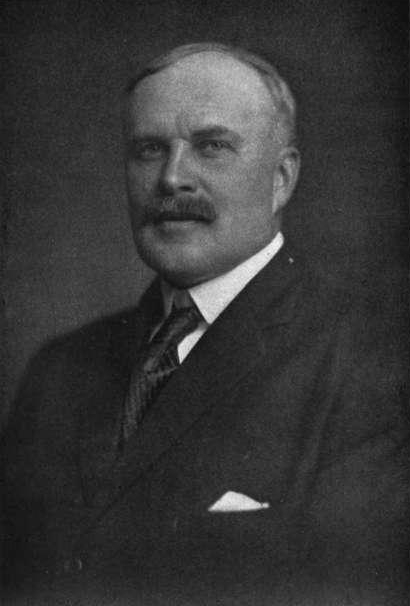
William Reuben George

William Reuben George founded a junior republic whose economic, civic, and social conditions reproduced those of the United States, and whose citizenship is vested in young people, especially those who were neglected or wayward.

George (born 1866) was a native of West Dryden, near Freeville, who was a businessman in New York City who became interested in the urchins of the street and their gangs. He began to organize them into more productive groups who helped the police. He longed to give these "toughs" some of the summer fresh air and fun that he had experienced as a child on the family farm.

In the summer of 1890, he took 22 children to Freeville with funds received from the New York Tribune, the sponsors of The Fresh Air Fund charity. Each summer from then until 1895 the number of children increased. Over these early years, he slowly developed his idea of "nothing without labor" and of a Junior Republic with laws made by young "citizens" and an economic system controlled by youngsters.

In 1895, George and five volunteers stayed through the winter in Freeville and thus a permanent colony was founded.

There were Women's Aid societies in New York City, Ithaca, Syracuse, Buffalo, Boston, and elsewhere to promote the work of the Republic. A republic for younger boys was established in Litchfield, Connecticut. A National Junior Republic near Annapolis Junction, Maryland, and a Carter Junior Republic at Readington, near Easton, Pennsylvania, are modelled on the George Junior Republic. New states were established between 1908 and 1910 at Chino, California, Grove City, Pennsylvania, and Flemington Junction, New Jersey. In February 1908, the National Association of Junior Republics was formed with George as its founder and director, its aims being to establish at least one republic in each state of the Union. Similar institutions for youth and miniature governments could also be established in other countries, modelled on the country in which each state is established. The Association also hoped to establish colonies for younger children, to be sent to the Junior Republic at age 15.

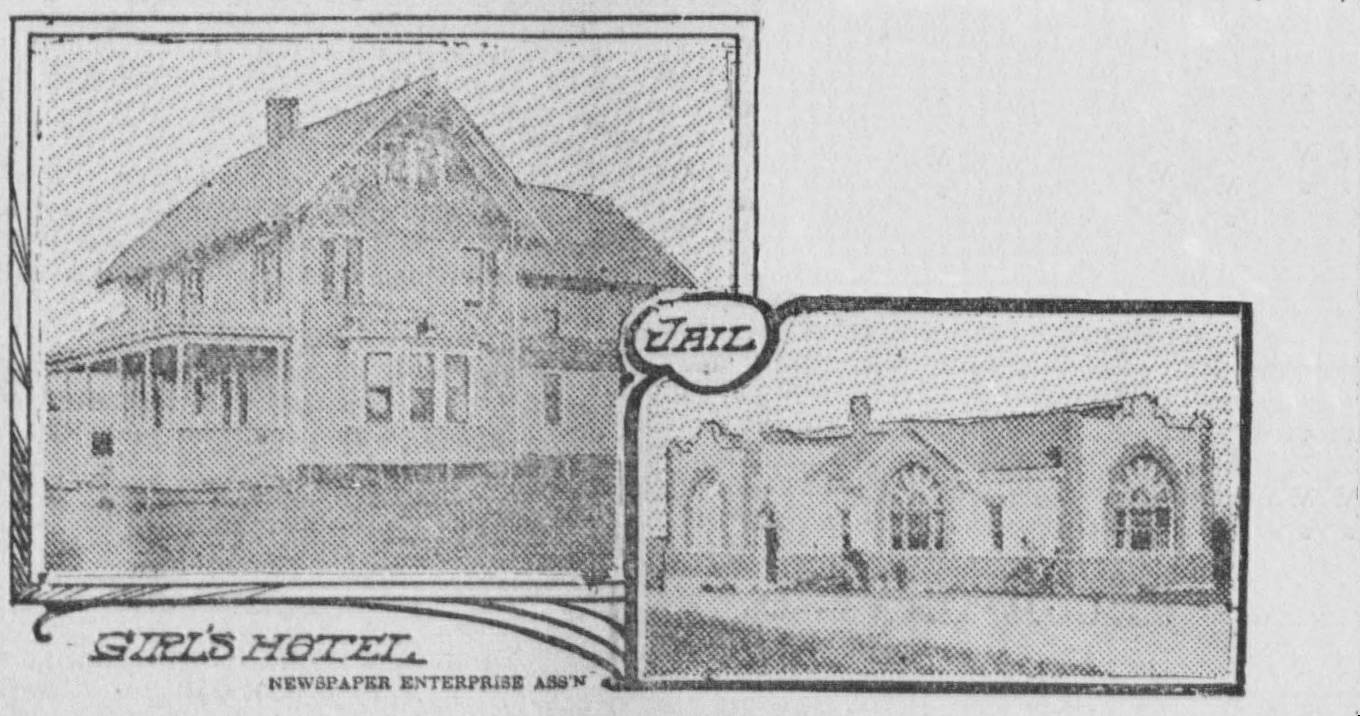
Two buildings (the "Girls' Hotel" and the "Jail") in the George Junior Republic, c. 1903-04

Over the years of William George's leadership, he was supported and the Junior Republic was visited by many prominent people who were interested in learning from his experiment. These included Lord Baden Powell, Eleanor and Franklin Roosevelt, Theodore Roosevelt, Thomas Mott Osborne, Alexander Forbes, Monsignor John Patrick Carroll-Abbing, and Jacob Riis.

Many of the early citizens of the Junior Republic went on to important careers and accomplishments. These included a supreme court justice, a Pulitzer Prize winner, an Academy Award recipient, a California state legislator, a French Croix de Guerre honoree, a missionary to China, and many who gave their lives in World War I and World War II.

== Current activity ==
In 2005, the George Junior Republic changed its name to The William George Agency for Children's Services, Inc.

Today's residential programs attempt to preserve the Junior Republic's ideals while providing more focused clinical oversight and treatment, with a strong educational emphasis.

Expansion in the service of providing additional treatment opportunities to children in need has been an agency priority since the early 1990s. The agency's board of directors in concert with the senior leadership team have, for the last 20 years, made a concerted effort to serve high risk, high need populations who have historically been underserved in New York State. The expansion took the form of nine newly constructed, state of the art residential homes, and many new and innovative programs.

In August 1996, when Barber Cottage opened, the George Junior Republic became the first private residential treatment center in New York State to be licensed to provide sex offender specific treatment to adolescent males who have engaged in sexually abusive behavior. There are currently 20 such beds and the agency is recognized as a leader in the field of adolescent S.O. treatment.

In July 2000, the Republic became one of only three private residential agencies in the state to open an OASAS licensed outpatient chemical dependency treatment clinic serving the needs of the residential population. It has been long recognized that the rate of diagnosable alcohol and/or substance abuse among adolescents entering residential treatment is at least 60%, and for many youngsters, it represents a primary treatment issue. The OASAS clinic currently serves up to 100 residents at any given time, and has consistently received superior performance reviews during OASAS program audits.

The fall of 2005 marked the opening of a dually diagnosed program for children with both intellectual disabilities and serious emotional, psychiatric disturbance. Previously, many of these youngsters were mixed in with youngsters with normal cognitive functioning, and were often exploited or isolated. The dually diagnosed program offers many specialized services and supports designed to improve their adaptive daily living skills, as well as their capacity to function independently. Currently there are 27 dually diagnosed beds.

In November 2011 and May 2014, Seidell & Ed George Cottages opened as Integrated Residential Substance Abuse Programs for adolescents who are dually diagnosed with alcohol and/or substance dependence and a co-occurring mental health disorder. Most of the young adults served in these programs have a history of failed inpatient treatment experiences in short-term rehabilitation programs as a result of their pattern of acting out behavior. The structure of the residential program is designed to offer these youngsters a safe, stable, and predictable living environment which will support and encourage their investment in treatment while an OASAS licensed clinic provides intensive chemical dependency services. Since the program's inception on November 1, 2011, through 2014, the utilization rate for the program was 94 percent.

In December 2011, the girls' program opened at Lodge Cottage. The agency had not served adolescent females in almost twenty years. In response to persistent demand, the agency made the decision to serve girls with a history of trauma and abuse.

During the twenty-year period between 1994 and 2014, the agency grew fourfold from approximately 45 beds to a licensed capacity of 189 beds, as part of an ongoing commitment to serve at-risk youth in New York State.

== See also ==
- Residential Treatment Center
- Social Services
- William Cameron Forbes
- Thomas Mott Osborne
