= George Junior Republic (Pennsylvania) =

American all-boys treatment facility

Coordinates: 41.171°N 80.111°W

Location
- 233 George Junior Road, Grove City, PA 16127

Information
- Established: 1909; 117 years ago
- Founder: William Reuben George
- Enrollment: c. 500
- Website: gjr.org/gjr-in-pa/

George Junior Republic is a behavioral and mental health institution headquarted in Grove City, Pennsylvania. It is one of the nation's largest private non-profit residential treatment facilities. George Junior Republic houses, educates (in collaboration with the Grove City Area School District), and provides therapeutic services to boys ages 8-18, girls ages 10-21, and adults with serious mental illness. George Junior Republic uses the Children and Residential Experiences (CARE) treatment model and provides psychological testing, psychiatric evaluation, education, vocational training, recreation and athletics for all residents. The institution is characterized by its many cottages that form a campus the size of a small college. All the houses are modern and they give the campus the appearance of an upper-class housing development.

== Founding ==
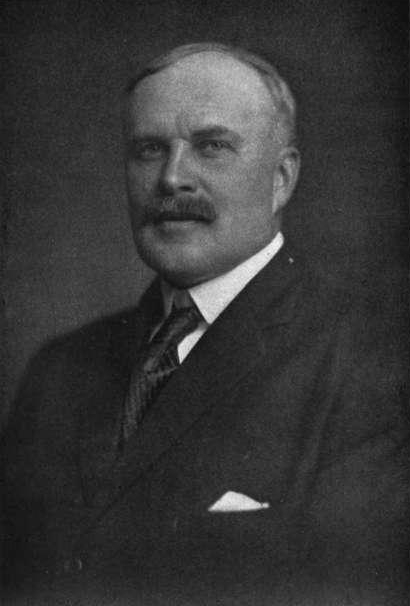
William Reuben George

The George Junior Republic in Grove City was founded by William Reuben George, an American philanthropist, in 1909. The original George Junior Republic was founded in Freeville, New York in 1895 as a self-governing colony requiring payment in labor for all that they received. "The George Junior Republic was run like a small village where the residents where engaged in self-supporting enterprises and administered their own laws." In 1910 George was forced to sever ties with the Freeville Junior Republic and make his home elsewhere after allegations of misconduct arose regarding his treatment of female citizens. After leaving direct supervision of the Freeville Republic, George became the director of the National Association of Junior Republics. In 1914 he was accused of misconduct in a case involving molestation of three girls at Freeville. The judges strongly condemned his "theory" of paternalism which allowed him to treat women and citizens of the republic "without regard to the rules and usages of common life and civilized society."

== Brief description of the life of an interned boy at the GJR in late 1949-1951 ==
In the late 1940s and well into 1951, the GJR cottages were supervised by husband and wife teams referred to by all as cottage parents and called "Aunt" and "Uncle". The GJR was probably 85% self-sufficient. There was the dairy, tailor shop, barber shop, blacksmith shop and the gardens raising much of the fruit and vegetables for the institution. During this period there were 3-4 major cottages housing from 90 to 120 boys. The housing consisted of 3-4 floors. Usually the basement was where the boys remained when not outside working. The basement also provided for showers and individual lockers for each boy. The main floor was primarily the kitchen and dining room. A small TV room was also provided for those boys that qualified for TV privileges. Uncle Milty was the most popular show of the time. The third floor consisted of a bedroom for the cottage parents and several small individual bedrooms, each housing four specially privileged boys. The top floor was totally open, much like a military barracks. WWII metal bunk beds were stacked two high throughout the entire floor.

The normal daily routine was to be up at 6:30 a.m. and down into the basement to take care of individual hygiene, then eat breakfast and off to work detail or school. Most of the boys who qualified were sent to the local high school in Grove City. When they returned from school, they went to whatever work area they were assigned. After supper was study time for those who attended school. Saturday morning was also a work period but Saturday afternoons were usually reserved for a movie in the gymnasium. Sunday was visitors' day when family members could come and spend the entire afternoon.

== See also ==
- Reform school
- Youth detention center
