= Grove City, Pennsylvania =

Borough in Pennsylvania, US

- Borough
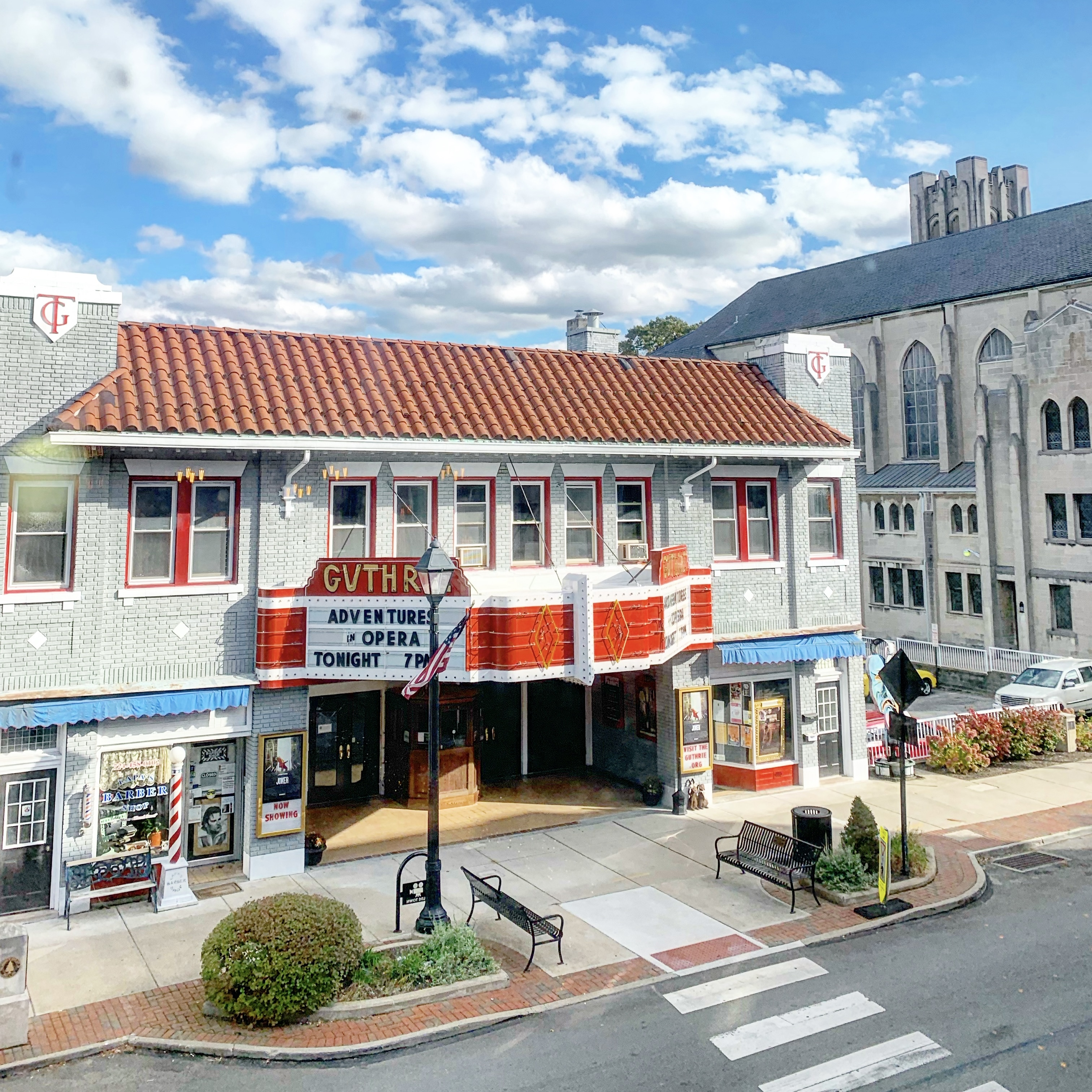
- Guthrie Theatre in downtown Grove City

- Flag
- Nickname: Crossroads of the East
- Interactive map of Grove City, Pennsylvania
- Location within Pennsylvania
- Coordinates: 41°9′37″N 80°5′13″W
- Country: United States
- State: Pennsylvania
- County: Mercer
- Settled: 1798
- Established: 1883

Government
  - Mayor: Randy L Riddle

Area
  - Total: 2.70 sq mi (7.00 km^{2})
  - Land: 2.69 sq mi (6.98 km^{2})
  - Water: 0.0039 sq mi (0.01 km^{2})
- Elevation: 1,256 ft (383 m)
- Highest elevation: 1,340 ft (410 m)
- Lowest elevation: 1,220 ft (370 m)

Population (2020)
  - Total: 7,871
  - Density: 2,919.5/sq mi (1,127.22/km^{2})
- Time zone: UTC-5 (EST)
  - Summer (DST): UTC-4 (EDT)
- ZIP Code: 16127
- Area code: 724
- FIPS code: 42-31656
- Website: grovecityonline.com

Grove City is a borough in southeastern Mercer County, Pennsylvania, United States. It is approximately 60 miles (97 km) north of Pittsburgh and 75 miles (121 km) south of Erie. The population was 7,894 at the 2020 census. It is part of the Hermitage micropolitan area.

Historically an industrial center, Grove City has manufactured locomotive engines, carriages, gas engines, foundry products, and motor trucks. It is the home of Grove City College, a private liberal arts college, as well as George Junior Republic. The nearby Grove City Premium Outlets take their name from Grove City.

== History ==
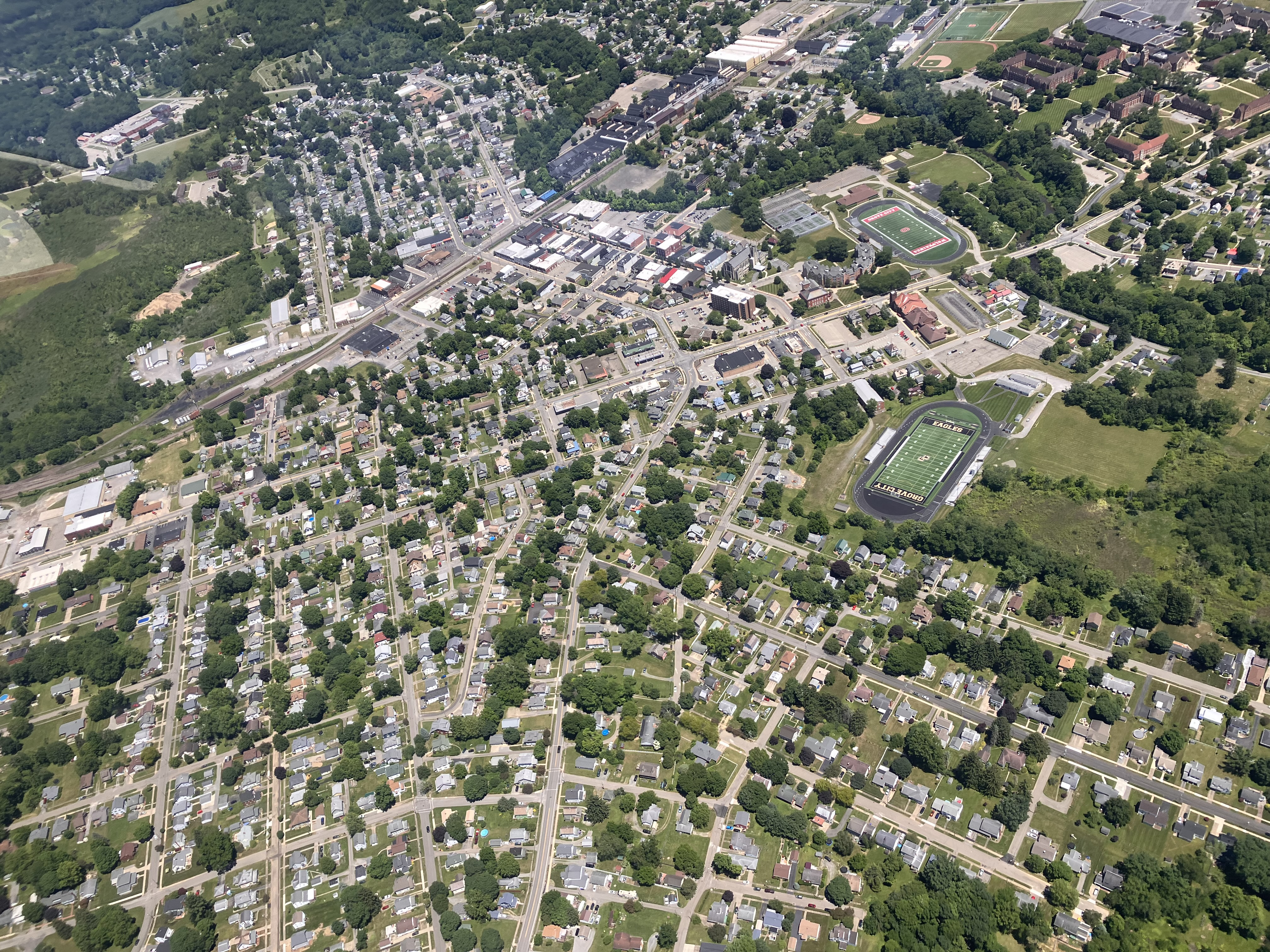
A 2024 aerial photo of Grove City

In 1798, Valentine Cunningham and his family from Huntingdon County, Pennsylvania settled along Wolf Creek, building a gristmill with fellow American Revolutionary War veteran and settler Robert Glenn on the creek in 1799 and naming the area Pine Grove. About a mile north, another community was drafted surrounding a gristmill, named Slabtown. In the early years of the 19th century, Cunningham built a sawmill and schoolhouse in Pine Grove, while Robert Moore built up the area around Slabtown with a sawmill and small businesses. By 1837, Cunningham's sons J.G. and Charles returned to Pine Grove to continue its expansion, formally laying it out around this time.

By the 1850s, a Wolf Creek post office had been formed to serve both communities as they became increasingly merged. Pine Grove Academy, the precursor to Grove City College, was established in 1858. Around the same time, large coal deposits were discovered in the area, kickstarting a mining industry. The Pittsburgh, Shenango and Lake Erie Railroad was extended to Pine Grove in 1872, and Pine Grove Normal Academy was chartered to grant degrees in 1876. On January 1, 1883, the borough of Grove City was incorporated, changing its name since Pine Grove, Schuylkill County was already established. George Junior Republic was established in 1909.

== Demographics ==
Historical population
| Census | Pop. | Note | %± |
|---|---|---|---|
| 1890 | 1,160 | | — |
| 1900 | 1,599 | | 37.8% |
| 1910 | 3,674 | | 129.8% |
| 1920 | 4,944 | | 34.6% |
| 1930 | 6,156 | | 24.5% |
| 1940 | 6,296 | | 2.3% |
| 1950 | 7,411 | | 17.7% |
| 1960 | 8,368 | | 12.9% |
| 1970 | 8,312 | | −0.7% |
| 1980 | 8,162 | | −1.8% |
| 1990 | 8,240 | | 1.0% |
| 2000 | 8,024 | | −2.6% |
| 2010 | 8,322 | | 3.7% |
| 2020 | 7,871 | | −5.4% |
| 2021 (est.) | 7,849 | ▼ | −0.3% |

As of the census of 2000, there were 8,024 people, 2,575 households, and 1,560 families residing in the borough. The population density was 3,069.7 inhabitants per square mile (1,185.2/km^{2}). There were 2,745 housing units at an average density of 1,035.1 per square mile (399.7/km^{2}). The racial makeup of the borough was 97.32% White, 0.64% African American, 0.06% Native American, 1.08% Asian, 0.02% Pacific Islander,0.14% from other races, and 0.74% from two or more races. Hispanic or Latino of any race were 0.54% of the population.

There were 2,575 households, out of which 26.0% had children under the age of 18 living with them, 49.6% were married couples living together, 8.9% had a female householder with no husband present, and 39.4% were non-families. 35.6% of all households were made up of individuals, and 18.1% had someone living alone who was 65 years of age or older. The average household size was 2.25 and the average family size was 2.94.

In the borough the population was spread out, with 16.7% under the age of 18, 31.8% from 18 to 24, 20.2% from 25 to 44, 14.6% from 45 to 64, and 16.7% who were 65 years of age or older. The median age was 27 years. For every 100 females there were 90.5 males. For every 100 females age 18 and over, there were 87.8 males.

The median income for a household in the borough was $34,598, and the median income for a family was $46,676. Males had a median income of $36,467 versus $21,934 for females. The per capita income for the borough was $16,365. About 4.8% of families and 8.5% of the population were below the poverty line, including 8.1% of those under age 18 and 6.4% of those age 65 or over.

== Economy ==
Grove City is home to two locomotive engine production plants for GE Transportation, which was purchased by Wabtec in 2018. Grove City is also home to two Asphalt Testing Equipment Companies Pine Instrument Company. In 1994, the Grove City Premium Outlets open-air outlet mall opened along Interstate 79. Grove City is also home to The Guthrie Theatre, which was built in 1927 for vaudeville. Admired for its Art Deco architecture, it evolved into a movie house. Now lovingly restored, the Guthrie has been converted into an entertainment destination with live theatre, musical acts, comedy shows, movies, food hall and a full service bar.

== Notable people ==
- Edie Adams, actress and singer, Emmy and Tony Award winner
- Jimmy Del Ray, professional wrestler
- Paula Kelly, singer with The Modernaires, Vocal Group Hall of Fame
- Paul Kengor, author and professor at Grove City College
- Smokin' Joe Kubek, Texas blues guitarist
- Tedd C. Nesbit, former member of Pennsylvania House of Representatives
- Gary Peters, baseball player, 1963 American League Rookie of the Year
- Dick Stevenson, former member of Pennsylvania House of Representatives
- Patricia Wettig, actress
