= Lisa Fruchtman =

American film and television editor and documentary director

- Born: August 1948 (age 77)
- Occupation: Film editor

Lisa Fruchtman (born August 1948) is an American film and television editor, and documentary director with about 25 film credits. Fruchtman won the Academy Award for Best Film Editing for The Right Stuff (1983). With her brother, Rob Fruchtman, she produced, directed, and edited the 2012 documentary Sweet Dreams.

== Editing career ==
After her high school years, Lisa Fruchtman enrolled at the University of Chicago and received an A.B. degree there in 1970. She began her career as a film editor in Hollywood in 1973 with the documentary short Ten: The Magic Number. Fruchtman was an assistant to editors Barry Malkin, Richard Marks, and Peter Zinner on The Godfather Part II (1974), directed by Francis Ford Coppola. This film was edited to have a complex structure that weaves a contemporary story with a background story in Sicily at the turn of the 19th and 20th centuries; the film was nominated for the BAFTA Award for Best Editing.

Fruchtman was one of several editors hired by Coppola in 1977 for the post-production of Apocalypse Now. Coppola had shot about 250 hours of film that needed to be cut down to 2.5 hours for its theatrical release. Malkin and Evan Lottman had done preliminary editing, but then dropped out of the project. The difficult editing required nearly two years. The film was released in August 1979. In 1980, she and her co-editors Richard Marks, Walter Murch, and Gerald B. Greenberg were nominated for the Academy Award for Best Film Editing, the ACE Eddie Award, and the BAFTA Award for Best Editing.

In 1984, she won the Oscar for Best Film Editing for The Right Stuff (1983), along with her co-editors Glenn Farr, Stephen A. Rotter, Douglas Stewart and Tom Rolf. The film was directed by Philip Kaufman. The editors were also nominated for the ACE Eddie Award for the film.

Fruchtman's first solo credit as editor for a major studio film was for Children of a Lesser God (1986), director Randa Haines' first major film. Fruchtman later cut Haines' The Doctor (1991) and Dance with Me (1998).

In 1991, she was nominated for another Oscar, for Coppola's The Godfather Part III with her co-editors Malkin and Murch. All three editors had long experience working with Coppola, on the earlier Godfather films and others.

In 1996, Fruchtman was nominated for an Eddie for the television film Truman, directed by Frank Pierson. The movie depicts U.S. President Harry S. Truman during World War II. She was also nominated for a Primetime Emmy Award (Outstanding Editing for a Miniseries or a Special - Single Camera Production).

In 2010, she received the Professional Achievement Award for alumni of the University of Chicago.

== Filmography (selection) ==
This filmography is based on the listing at the Internet Movie Database.

Editor
Year	Film	Director	Notes
1979	Apocalypse Now	Francis Ford Coppola	Second collaboration with Francis Ford Coppola
1980	Heaven's Gate	Michael Cimino	
1981	Street Music	Jenny Bowen	
1983	The Right Stuff	Philip Kaufman	
1986	Children of a Lesser God	Randa Haines	First collaboration with Randa Haines
1990	The Godfather Part III	Francis Ford Coppola	Third collaboration with Francis Ford Coppola
1991	The Doctor	Randa Haines	Second collaboration with Randa Haines
1993	Shimmer	John Hanson	
1997	My Best Friend's Wedding	P. J. Hogan	
1998	Dance with Me	Randa Haines	Fourth collaboration with Randa Haines
2002	Teknolust	Lynn Hershman Leeson	
2004	The Woodsman	Nicole Kassell	
2004	A Love Song for Bobby Long	Shainee Gabel	
2006	Bonneville	Christopher N. Rowley	
2015	Love & Taxes	Jacob Kornbluth	

Editorial department
Year	Film	Director	Role	
1974	The Godfather Part II	Francis Ford Coppola	Assistant editor	First collaboration with Francis Ford Coppola
2006	Christmas in Wonderland	James Orr	Editorial consultant	
2010	Little Sister	Richard Bowen	Supervising editor	

Additional crew
Year	Film	Director	Role
2007	When a Man Falls in the Forest	Ryan Eslinger	Consultant
2022	What Comes Around	Amy Redford	Editorial consultant

Thanks
Year	Film	Director	Role	Notes
1985	On the Edge	Rob Nilsson	Special thanks to	
1993	Wrestling Ernest Hemingway	Randa Haines	Thanks	Third collaboration with Randa Haines
2006	Colma: The Musical	Richard Wong	Thanks	
2013	Test	Chris Mason Johnson	Special thanks	

Documentaries

Editor
Year	Film	Director
1973	Ten: The Magic Number	Barrie Nelson
1977	The Grateful Dead Movie	Jerry Garcia; Leon Gast
2012	Sweet Dreams	Herself; Rob Fruchtman
2016	Vegas Baby	Amanda Micheli

Editorial department
Year	Film	Director	Role
2016	Crossing Bhutan	Ben Henretig	Story editor Supervising editor
2017	Saving Capitalism	Jacob Kornbluth; Sari Gilman	Supervising editor
2018	The Providers	Laura Green; Anna Moot-Levin	Story consultant

Additional crew
Year	Film	Director	Role
2016	Crossing Bhutan	Ben Henretig	Story editor

Director
Year	Film
2012	Sweet Dreams

Producer
Year	Film	Director	Credit
2012	Sweet Dreams	Herself; Rob Fruchtman	Producer
2024	Counted Out	Vicki Abeles	Producer

Shorts

Editor
Year	Film	Director
1986	Captain EO	Francis Ford Coppola

Editorial department
Year	Film	Director	Role
2012	Witness 11	Sean Mitchell	Consulting editor

TV movies

Editor
Year	Film	Director
1995	Truman	Frank Pierson
1999	Witness Protection	Richard Pearce
2003	Normal	Jane Anderson

Editorial department
Year	Film	Director	Role
2002	Point of Origin	Newton Thomas Sigel	Consulting editor
