= Miles Goodman =

American composer (1948-1996)

- Born: Elliott Thomas Goodman; August 27, 1948; Los Angeles, California, U.S.
- Died: August 16, 1996 (aged 47); Santa Monica, California, U.S.
- Education: Antioch College
- Occupations: Composer, record producer
- Years active: 1975–1996
- Spouse: Katherine Copple (m. 1980)
- Children: 2

Elliott Miles Goodman (August 27, 1948 – August 16, 1996) was an American composer for television and film. He frequently collaborated with film director Frank Oz, for whom Goodman scored such films as Dirty Rotten Scoundrels (1988), What About Bob? (1991) and Housesitter (1992). For his score to Oz's Little Shop of Horrors (1986), Goodman was nominated for the Golden Globe Award for Best Original Score.

== Early life and education ==
Goodman was born on August 27, 1948 in Los Angeles. He graduated from Antioch College in Yellow Springs, Ohio, in 1972 with a degree in English. In 1969, he studied Shakespeare in London.

Goodman became interested in film scoring through his cousin, Johnny Mandel, an Oscar-winning film composer. Goodman at first planned to become a director, despite his strong and eclectic taste in jazz and other music. But composing for film intervened in conversations with Mandel. As a result, Goodman returned to Los Angeles and studied music and film scoring with private teachers including Albert Harris.

"He was very eclectic in his musical tastes. Before film scoring he was very attracted to jazz, Brazilian music and theater. He started life as a songwriter," Mandel said. Mandel would serve as a mentor for Goodman.

== Career ==
When Goodman relocated to Hollywood, he met Oscar Castro-Neves, who became his friend and music partner. They worked together for 30 years. "He started from ground zero, (learning) 'This is a middle C,' and became . . . a great musician," said Castro-Neves. "He was a very inspired composer with a great ability to write melodies and a great orchestral talent."

By the mid-1970s, Goodman did his first film projects as a composer for such films as Slumber Party '57 (1976).

In 1979, Goodman arranged orchestrations on the Peter Sellers comedy Being There for Mandel. Goodman and Mandel would continue to collaborate with each other over the next few years, most notably to score Sidney Lumet's Oscar-nominated film, The Verdict (1982). He later composed the score for Teen Wolf (1985), starring Michael J. Fox.

He also orchestrated or scored music for Footloose (1984), About Last Night (1986), Little Shop of Horrors (1986), La Bamba (1987), Dirty Rotten Scoundrels (1988), Problem Child (1990), What About Bob? (1991), Housesitter (1992), Sister Act 2: Back in the Habit (1993), Dunston Checks In (1996), Larger than Life (1996) and 'Til There Was You (1997), the latter two released posthumously. Working so often in films under the genre of comedy manifested Goodman's reputation as the "King of Comedy." Variety praised Goodman's score for Dirty Rotten Scoundrels, calling it "a great, imitative '30s jazzy score." Goodman also composed music for the Australian film The Delinquents (1989).

When a friend suggested to Goodman that he try producing records, he conceived an album of contemporary Brazilian music with harmonica great Toots Thielemans titled The Brasil Project.

Goodman and Castro-Neves were also co-producers of a series of well-reviewed jazz albums. They arranged 12 selections for the successful The Billie Holiday Songbook and for Color and Light: Jazz Sketches on Sondheim, which featured jazz artists interpreting the works of Stephen Sondheim. Color and Light: Jazz Sketches of Sondheim was produced by Goodman and Castro-Neves in 1995 and was highly praised. The album was named one of the year's top five albums by Time and reached No. 6 on Billboard's jazz charts. The Billie Holiday Songbook, featuring trumpeter Terence Blanchard, was also a hit with critics and customers.

"Working with Miles Goodman was also a great experience with me," Blanchard said. Blanchard considered Goodman his mentor. According to Blanchard, they met when Goodman hired him to play on the soundtrack for his score to Housesitter. They remained friends until Goodman's death.

Goodman and Blanchard have collaborated with Brazilian vocalist and pianist Ivan Lins. Goodman had also produced the album, A Brazilian Christmas, as well as produced discs by Vanessa Rubin. Goodman and Castro-Neves had also worked on a project of an audio-only series of classic children's stories narrated over newly composed music with other artists.

He even completed work on several albums that were scheduled for release by 1997 that featured such artists as cellist Yo-Yo Ma, soprano Kathleen Battle and pianist Ottmar Liebert.

According to Frank Oz, Goodman completed and recorded a full score for the film, The Indian in the Cupboard (1995), but it was rejected and replaced by Randy Edelman's score as a result. Oz also claimed to have asked Goodman just before his death to do the music for his subsequent film In & Out (1997).

In January 1996, Goodman and Blanchard were hired to score the romantic comedy, 'Til There Was You (1997), released by Paramount Pictures. Director Scott Winant approved the duo, thinking the comical mastery of Goodman and the jazzy romance of Blanchard would make the perfect combination. Blanchard was even excited about collaborating with his friend and mentor that he rearranged his summer tour of The Heart Speaks around Goodman's ever-busy scoring schedule.

On November 18, 1996, Goodman was posthumously awarded the SOCAN Film Music Award by the Society of Composers, Authors and Music Publishers of Canada.

== Personal life and death ==
Goodman died from a heart attack at St. John's Hospital and Medical Center in Santa Monica, California on August 16, 1996, at the age of 47.

"There was some heart disease in the family. His father passed away from a heart attack, but he was really healthy and it was entirely unexpected," Dylan Goodman said. He was described as "a wonderful talent" by his cousin, Johnny Mandel. He was also close friends with Frank Oz, who referred to Goodman as "Bud."

"I had nothing but respect for his work," said fellow jazz producer Steve Backer, "He realized that jazz needed a smart contextualization to sell in big numbers, and he and his partner Oscar Castro-Neves had great ideas that revitalized several artists."

Since his death, Antioch College, Goodman's alma mater, has implemented a scholarship fund in his name.

== List of work ==
=== Filmography ===
Year	Film	Director	Notes
1975	Wham! Bam! Thank You, Spaceman!	William A. Levey	with Dave White
1976	Rattlers	John McCauley	
1976	Slumber Party '57	William A. Levey	
1979	Skatetown, U.S.A.	William A. Levey	
1982	Lookin' to Get Out	Hal Ashby	with Johnny Mandel
1982	Jinxed!	Don Siegel	with Bruce Roberts
1983	Table for Five	Robert Lieberman	with John Morris
1983	The Man Who Wasn't There	Bruce Malmuth	
1985	Teen Wolf	Rod Daniel	
1986	About Last Night...	Edward Zwick	
1986	Little Shop of Horrors	Frank Oz	
1987	The Squeeze	Roger Young	
1987	La Bamba	Luis Valdez	with Carlos Santana
1987	Real Men	Dennis Feldman	
1987	Like Father Like Son	Rod Daniel	
1988	Dirty Rotten Scoundrels	Frank Oz	
1989	K-9	Rod Daniel	
1989	Staying Together	Lee Grant	
1989	The Delinquents	Chris Thomson	
1990	Opportunity Knocks	Donald Petrie	
1990	Vital Signs	Marisa Silver	
1990	Problem Child	Dennis Dugan	
1990	Funny About Love	Leonard Nimoy	
1991	He Said, She Said	Ken Kwapis; Marisa Silver	
1991	What About Bob?	Frank Oz	
1991	The Super	Rod Daniel	
1992	Housesitter	Frank Oz	
1992	The Muppet Christmas Carol	Brian Henson	Score only; songs written by Paul Williams
1993	Indian Summer	Mike Binder	
1993	Sister Act 2: Back in the Habit	Bill Duke	
1994	Getting Even with Dad	Howard Deutch	
1994	Blankman	Mike Binder	with Michael Jay
1995	For Better or Worse	Jason Alexander	
1995	The Indian in the Cupboard	Frank Oz	rejected; replaced by Randy Edelman
1996	Dunston Checks In	Ken Kwapis	
1996	Sunset Park	Steve Gomer	
1996	Larger than Life	Howard Franklin	
1997	'Til There Was You	Scott Winant	with Terence Blanchard

=== Television credits ===
Year	Title	Format
1977-1978	James at 16	6 episodes: Fast and Loose; The Blowout; Champions; An Hour Before Midnight; Ducks; Queen of the Silver Dollar
1978	Lou Grant	Episode: Mob
1979	A Last Cry for Help	Television movie
1981	Eight Is Enough	4 episodes: The Way We Were; The Best Little Telethon in Sacramento; Yet Another Seven Days in February; Goals
1982	King's Crossing	3 episodes: Long Ago Tomorrow; Confusion by Cupid; One Afternoon
1982	Having It All	Television movie
1982	Cagney & Lacey	3 episodes: Witness to an Incident; Mr. Lonelyhearts; Recreational Use
1983	The Face of Rage	Television movie
1983	High School U.S.A.	Television movie
1983	An Uncommon Love	Television movie
1984	Things Are Looking Up	Television movie
1985	A Reason to Live	Television movie
1985	Poison Ivy	Television movie
1985	Me and Mom	Series
1985	Space	Miniseries
1985	Children of the Night	Television movie
1986	Passion Flower	Television movie
1986	Thompson's Last Run	Television movie
1986	Blind Justice	Television movie
1986	American Geisha	Television movie
1986	Amazing Stories	Episode: The Eternal Mind
1988	Outback Bound	Television movie
1989	Mick and Frankie	Television movie
1989	Travelling Man	Television movie
1989	Money, Power, Murder.	Television movie
1990	Tales from the Crypt	Episode: The Ventriloquist's Dummy
1992	For Richer, For Poorer	Television movie
1992	Indecency	Television movie

=== Other credits ===
- 1983 Gospel (Documentary)
- 1987 Oh Happy Day (Video)
