= Todd Black =

American film producer (born 1960)

- Born: February 9, 1960 (age 66); Dallas, Texas, U.S.
- Education: University of Southern California
- Occupation: Producer
- Years active: 1986–present

Todd Black (born February 9, 1960) is an American film producer best known for producing The Pursuit of Happyness (2006), The Taking of Pelham 123 (2009), The Equalizer (2014), Southpaw (2015), The Magnificent Seven (2016), and Fences (2016) for which he received an Academy Award for Best Picture nomination with Scott Rudin and Denzel Washington.

He initially started off working at Joe Wizan Productions in 1984, who was later evolved into a full partnership to became Wizan/Black Films in 1989. Wizan and Black broke up in 1993 to partner with director Randa Haines and formed Black/Haines Productions.

Black later became president of production at Mandalay Entertainment in 1995, only to quit in 1998 to form the production company Black & Blu, with Jason Blumenthal. Blumenthal first met Black while working at Joe Wizan, only to move to Black/Haines Productions at 20th Century Fox in 1993, and both worked at Mandalay Entertainment in 1995 before starting Black & Blu. In 2000, it merged with The Steve Tisch Company, eventually becoming the current Escape Artists, who is still running today.

== Filmography ==
He was a producer in all films unless otherwise noted.

=== Film ===
Year	Film	Credit
1988	Split Decisions	Co-producer
1988	Spellbinder	Co-producer
1990	The Guardian	Co-producer
1990	Short Time	
1991	Becoming Colette	Executive producer
1992	Stop! Or My Mom Will Shoot	Executive producer
1992	Class Act	
1993	Fire in the Sky	
1993	Wrestling Ernest Hemingway	
1995	The Double	
1996	Dunston Checks In	
1996	A Family Thing	
2001	A Knight's Tale	
2002	Antwone Fisher	
2003	Alex & Emma	
2003	S.W.A.T.	Co-executive producer
2005	The Weather Man	
2006	The Pursuit of Happyness	
2007	The Great Debaters	
2008	Seven Pounds	
2009	Knowing	
2009	The Taking of Pelham 123	
2010	The Back-up Plan	
2012	Hope Springs	
2014	Sex Tape	
2014	The Equalizer	
2015	Unfinished Business	
2015	Southpaw	
2016	The Magnificent Seven	
2016	Fences	
2017	The Upside	
2017	Roman J. Israel, Esq.	
2018	The Equalizer 2	
2019	Troop Zero	
2020	Ma Rainey's Black Bottom	
2021	Being the Ricardos	
2021	A Journal for Jordan	
2022	The Man from Toronto	
2022	Emancipation	
2023	Cassandro	
2023	The Equalizer 3	
2024	It Ends with Us	Executive producer
2024	The Piano Lesson	
2025	Highest 2 Lowest	
2026	Masters of the Universe	
2026	Voicemails for Isabelle	
2026	The Social Reckoning	
2026	Madden	

Thanks

Year	Film	Role
2007	The Babysitters	Special thanks

=== Television ===
Year	Title	Credit	Notes
1986	Sunday Drive	Executive producer	Television film
1991	Perfect Harmony	Executive producer	Television film
1993	Official Denial	Executive producer	Television film
2016	Prototype	Executive producer	Television film
2019	Perpetual Grace, LTD	Executive producer	
2021	Dr. Death	Executive producer	
2019−23	Servant	Executive producer	
