= Sean Mitchell =

Sean Mitchell (or variants) may refer to:

- Shawn Mitchell, American politician
- Sean Mitchell (filmmaker), director of Witness 11
- Sean Mitchell (motocross), participated in 2013 FIM Motocross World Championship season
- Sean Mitchell (Shortland Street), a character on the soap opera Shortland Street
