= Michael Convertino =

American composer

- Born: 1952 (age 73–74); New York City
- Genres: Film scores, soundtracks, rock
- Occupations: Composer, musician
- Instrument: Keyboards
- Years active: 1982–present

Michael John Convertino (born 1952 in New York City) is an American musician and film score composer best known for his collaborations with director Randa Haines on films like Children of a Lesser God, The Doctor, Wrestling Ernest Hemingway, and Dance with Me, as well as The Hidden, Bull Durham, Things to Do in Denver When You're Dead, and the Tim Allen comedies The Santa Clause and Jungle 2 Jungle.

== Filmography ==
- Frankenweenie (1984, short film)
- Hollywood Vice Squad (1986)
- Faerie Tale Theatre (1986, 1 episode)
- Children of a Lesser God (1986)
- Mistress (1987)
- The Hidden (1987)
- Bull Durham (1988)
- Queen of Hearts (1989)
- Shattered Dreams (1990)
- Tales from the Crypt (1990, 1 episode)
- The End of Innocence (1990)
- The Doctor (1991)
- The Waterdance (1992)
- Aspen Extreme (1993)
- Bodies, Rest & Motion (1993)
- A Home of Our Own (1993)
- Wrestling Ernest Hemingway (1993)
- Guarding Tess (1994)
- Milk Money (1994)
- The Santa Clause (1994)
- Things to Do in Denver When You're Dead (1995)
- Pie in the Sky (1995)
- Bed of Roses (1996)
- Mother Night (1996)
- The Last of the High Kings (1996)
- Jungle 2 Jungle (1997)
- Dance with Me (1998)
- Where's Marlowe? (1998)
- Snow White: The Fairest of Them All (2001)
- Liberty Stands Still (2002)
- Milwaukee, Minnesota (2003)
- We Don't Live Here Anymore (2004)
- Straight into Darkness (2004)
- Wake Wood (2009)
