= World Theatre =

World Theatre may refer to:

- World Theatre (Kearney, Nebraska), a historic movie theater and performing arts center in Kearney, Nebraska
- World Theatre (New York City), a former theater in New York City
- World Theatre (Szczecin), a former movie theater in Szczecin, Poland
- World Theatre (TV series), a 1959 British television series

== See also ==
- Whole World Theatre
- World Theatre Day
- World Theatre Season
- World Theatre Training Institute
