= The Doctor (1991 film) =

1991 film by Randa Haines

- Film poster
- Directed by: Randa Haines
- Screenplay by: Robert Caswell
- Based on: A Taste of My Own Medicine; 1988 memoir by Edward Rosenbaum
- Produced by: Laura Ziskin
- Starring: William Hurt; Christine Lahti; Mandy Patinkin; Elizabeth Perkins
- Cinematography: John Seale
- Edited by: Lisa Fruchtman; Bruce Green
- Music by: Michael Convertino
- Production companies: Touchstone Pictures; Silver Screen Partners IV
- Distributed by: Buena Vista Pictures Distribution
- Release date: July 24, 1991
- Running time: 123 minutes
- Country: United States
- Language: English
- Budget: $12 million
- Box office: $38 million

The Doctor is a 1991 American drama film directed by Randa Haines. It is loosely based on Dr. Edward Rosenbaum's 1988 memoir A Taste Of My Own Medicine. The film stars William Hurt as Jack McKee, a doctor who undergoes a transformation in his views about life, illness and human relationships.

== Plot ==
Dr. Jack McKee is a successful surgeon at a leading San Francisco hospital. He and his wife, Anne, have all the trappings of success, although Jack works such long hours that he rarely has time to see their son Nicky and has become somewhat emotionally dead to his wife. His "bedside manner" with his patients, in many cases seriously ill, is also lacking. The decorum in the operating theater is very casual and the chatter between him and his partner, Dr. Murray Kaplan, is not particularly professional.

Returning home from a charity event, Jack has a coughing fit. Anne is shocked when he coughs up blood all over her and the car. In an examination, Jack has a sample of a growth removed from his throat. The biopsy comes back positive for cancer. His time spent with another cold, impersonal surgeon in this examination is the beginning of his transformation. Further tests and disappointments are blended with scenes of other patients' grace and empathy towards each other and a much better view of the delays and missteps of their doctors and medical support personnel.

As Jack experiences life as a patient, he gains a clearer understanding of the emotional void hospitals, some doctors, and his own colleagues can display. He befriends June Ellis, a fellow cancer patient who has an inoperable brain tumor. She gets him to promise to never lie or mislead a patient again. Jack begins to bark at the medical establishment. Jack and June take off to see a Native American show, but the pace is too much for her. Anne, meanwhile, struggles to understand Jack's relationship with June.

Jack's radiation treatment does not stop the cancer on his vocal cords. His despair ends in a confrontation with Dr. Leslie Abbott, the surgeon treating him whom he provokes in a heated discussion. Jack asks a colleague he has previously ridiculed, Dr. Eli Bloomfield, to perform his needed surgery. Jack apologizes for his and Murray's insulting behavior, to which Eli replies with a smile, "Well, Jack, I've always wanted to slit your throat, and now I've got the chance." Eli's bedside manner is a perfect example for Jack.

Jack's cancer is treated and cured, but June dies. The experience changes Jack forever. When he returns to work, he begins to teach new medical interns about the importance of showing compassion and sensitivity towards their patients, which in turn will make them better doctors. Jack puts the interns in patient gowns, assigns them various illnesses and orders all the tests for them to "feel" the experience that they will soon put their patients through.

== Cast ==
- William Hurt as Dr. Jack McKee
- Christine Lahti as Anne McKee
- Elizabeth Perkins as June Ellis
- Mandy Patinkin as Dr. Murray Kaplan
- Adam Arkin as Dr. Eli Bloomfield
- Charlie Korsmo as Nicky McKee
- Wendy Crewson as Dr. Leslie Abbott
- Bill Macy as Dr. Al Cade
- J.E. Freeman as Ralph
- Kyle Secor as Alan
- Zakes Mokae as Dr. Charles Reed (uncredited)

== Production ==
Warren Beatty was originally announced for the lead role but left over creative differences with the director. William Hurt replaced him, reteaming with Haines again after their 1986 film Children of a Lesser God.

== Reception ==
The movie gained positive reviews. Based on 21 reviews, it holds a favorable 81% rating on Rotten Tomatoes as of December 2025.

=== Box office ===
The movie was a modest box office success, grossing $38 million in the US.

== Award (nominations) ==
- Young Artist Award for Best Family Feature Film – Drama
