= Jurij Alschitz =

Russian-German theatre director and pedagogue

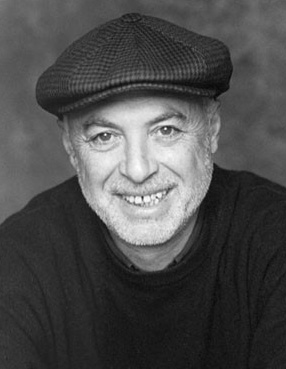
Jurij Alschitz.

Jurij Leonowitsch Alschitz or Jurij Al'šic (Юрий Леонович Альшиц; born 9 August 1947 in Odesa, Soviet Union) is a Ukrainian-German theatre director, acting pedagogue and researcher specialising in applied theatre practice. He is known for developing a comprehensive artistic methodological approach for 21st century dramatic arts, ‘Training as Method’. He is the artistic director of the European Association for Theatre Culture and the World Theatre Training Institute AKT-ZENT/ITI, appointed by the International Theatre Institute as research centre for theatre training methods.

== His life ==
Alschitz comes from a theatre artistic family - his mother was the actress Raisa Stavitskaja and his father was the stage designer Leon Alschitz.

=== Training and teaching in Russia ===
Alschitz first studied directing at the Moscow State University for Culture & Arts from 1969 to 1973 and was taught by J. N. Malkovsky, a direct student of K.S. Stanislavsky. After a number of productions at state theatres in Moscow, Kiev, Odessa, Riga and other cities, Alschitz embarked upon a second course of studies at GITIS, the Russian Academy of Theatre Arts, where he was taught by Prof.Mikhail Butkevich, Oleg Koudriachov, and Prof. Anatoly Vasiliev. From 1989 to 1992 he held a teaching position at GITIS and in 1987 he was a founding member of the theatre School of Dramatic Art - Antatolij Vasiljev. Alschitz was an actor and trainer in Vasiljev’s legendary production of Luigi Pirandello’s Six Characters in Search of an Author. The production toured to festivals worldwide. His reflections on the training methods he used with this ensemble would form the basis of his 2003 doctoral dissertation ‘Ensemble and Personality: their artistic and ethical relationship’, awarded by GITIS - the Russian Academy for Theatre Arts.

=== Teacher in Europe ===
After moving to Berlin in 1992, Alschitz definitively shifted the focus of his work to acting pedagogy. In particular, he began to focus on continuous education for professional actors and directors and on the development of a communicable pedagogy and methodology for acting teachers. He thus embarked upon a phase of intensive practical research and teaching at a number of theatre schools and academies, including the State University of Music and Performing Arts Stuttgart, Folkwang Hochschule (Essen), Berlin University of the Arts, the Dramatiska Institutet (Stockholm), Malmö Theatre Academy, Civica Accademia D’Arte Dramatica Nico Pepe (Udine), Film Institute (Rome), Pontedera Teatro, Scuola D’Arte Drammatica Paolo Grassi (Milan).

=== Founder of the European Association for Theatre Culture ===
With the aim of undertaking long-term concentrated research into acting pedagogy, Alschitz founded three European theatre research centres: in 1994, Skandinaviskt Centrum for Utforskning av Teater (SCUT) in Stockholm; in 1995, AKT-ZENT Internationales Theaterzentrum in Berlin and PROTEI – Progetti Teatrali Internazionali in Rome. In 2000, these three independently operating centres, along with the newly founded KOINE- Langages Transatlantiques centre in Paris, became affiliated as the European Association for Theatre Culture, with Alschitz as the artistic director.

Since 1996, Alschitz has mounted wide-ranging projects on various specific themes, which have been undertaken in cooperation with the centres of the European Association for Theatre Culture, leading academies worldwide and the national centres of the International Theatre Institute. In the process, he produced a number of books on acting such as The Vertical of the Role: A Method for the actor’s self-preparation, 40 Questions of one Role, in which he introduces maieutics as a method for the analysis of a role, and The Art of Dialogue which presents for the first time his concept of ‘Spherical Dialogue’.

With ‘School after Theatre’, a cooperation with GITIS, Alschitz introduced to Western Europe the principle of continuous professional education for actors and directors. Between 1995 and 2009 this three-year programme was delivered to 9 different classes with modules held in Estonia, Greece, Germany, Italy, Norway, Sweden and Russia.

With the International Directors’ and Trainers’ Colloquium, he introduced courses for acting teachers, which he presented in 2001 at the Theatre Olympics in Moscow as an innovative form of professional education in the field of acting pedagogy.

He had already received international attention for his presentation of this theme at the first World Conference of Rectors of Higher Education Institutions in 1999, completely reappraising the role of acting pedagogues and making the training of trainers the highest priority for the development of the theatre.

Following on from this, in 1999 Alschitz organised METHODIKA, the first international festival for theatre training methods. The festival subsequently took place biannually in Italy, Sweden, Russia and Cyprus, each time with a different theme, becoming a think tank for new, unresearched approaches to theatre education.

Between 2012 and 2014, Alschitz continued work on his theme of ‘Training the Trainers’, putting it into practice with the first international Master’s programme for acting teachers, ‘Teaching Professional Theatre Practice’, at Centro Universitario de Teatro of the Universidad Nacional Autonoma de Mexico (UNAM). His manifesto, ‘The New Face of the Acting Teacher’ suggests alternative forms for and fundamental changes in teaching theatre.

Since the foundation of the European Association for Theatre Culture, Alschitz has through seminars and laboratories educated and trained numerous actors and directors and thus built up his so-called ‘Team of Teachers’, who teach and disseminate his methodology worldwide.

=== Research Centre of the International Theatre Institute ===
Based on its research activity, AKT-ZENT International Theatre Centre was in 2006 named Research Centre of the ITI Theatre Education & Training Committee. In 2011, the General Assembly of the International Theatre Institute appointed AKT-ZENT as the ITI Research Centre for Theatre Training Methods under the artistic direction of Dr Jurij Alschitz.

Since 2017, Alschitz has been the artistic-academic director of the World Theatre Training Institute AKT-ZENT/ITI. The Institute’s focus is on the World Theatre Training Library, a long-term study in artistic and methodological approaches to theatre training worldwide. Since 2010, Alschitz has travelled to nearly all continents of the world for this project, conducting interviews, attending rehearsals and giving lectures and seminars. International laboratories allowed Alschitz to develop new training exercises from the ideas and impressions he acquired worldwide, along with the latest findings from science and technology, such as those in fractal geometry, quantum physics, wave theory and resonance phenomena. From this he developed new teaching formats and the concept of Quantum Pedagogy. Alschitz pursues the idea of a holistic theater in which the artist sees himself as part of the theater cosmos and thus achieves individual freedom and autonomy. Part of the new teaching concept was the Hybrid Education on the institute's own online learning platform. In 2020 he created the Online Theatre Academy together with his Team of Teachers, leading his own department School of Jurij Alschitz.

Alschitz is a sought-after expert for international festivals and conferences. His books have been published in numerous languages worldwide.

== Books ==
- Alschitz, Jurij (2003). Die Vertikale der Rolle. Eine Methode zur selbstständigen Erarbeitung der Rolle. Berlin Germany: AKT-ZENT BERLIN. ISBN 9783980923019.
- Alschitz, Jurij (2005). 40 Fragen an eine Rolle. Eine Methode zur selbstständigen Erarbeitung der Rolle. Berlin Germany: AKT-ZENT BERLIN. ISBN 9783980923040.
- Alschitz, Jurij (1998). La Grammatica Dell'Attore. Il training. Italy: Ubulibri Milan. ISBN 9788877481955.
- Alschitz, Jurij (2004). .La Matematica Dell'Attore. Italy: Ubulibri Milan. ISBN 9788877482402.
- Alschitz, Jurij (2007). .Teatro senza Regista. Italy: Titivillus Pisa. ISBN 9788872181973.
- Alschitz, Jurij (2003). .The Vertical of the Role. A methode for the actor's self-preparation. Berlin Germany: AKT-ZENT BERLIN. ISBN 9783980923002.
- Alschitz, Jurij (2005). 40 Questions of one Role. A method for the actor's self-preparation. Berlin Germany: AKT-ZENT BERLIN. ISBN 9783980923057.
- Alschitz, Jurij (2003). Training forever. Malmö: Lund University, Theatre Academy. ISBN 9789197497312.
