= Dance with Me (1998 film) =

1998 film by Randa Haines

- Directed by: Randa Haines
- Written by: Daryl Matthews
- Produced by: Shinya Egawa; Randa Haines; Lauren Weissman
- Starring: Vanessa L. Williams; Chayanne; Kris Kristofferson; Jane Krakowski; Beth Grant; Joan Plowright
- Cinematography: Fred Murphy
- Edited by: Lisa Fruchtman; William S. Scharf
- Music by: Michael Convertino
- Production companies: Columbia Pictures; Mandalay Pictures
- Distributed by: Sony Pictures Releasing
- Release dates: August 26, 1998 (Canada, U.S.)
- Running time: 126 minutes
- Country: United States
- Language: English
- Box office: $15.9 million

Dance with Me is a 1998 American romantic dance drama film directed by Randa Haines and starring Vanessa L. Williams and Chayanne.

== Plot ==
After his mother’s death, Rafael Infante travels from Santiago, Cuba, to Houston, Texas, to work as a handyman for John Burnett, his estranged father, who owns a dance studio. At the studio, Rafael quickly forms friendships with dancer Bea Johnson and receptionist Lovejoy, and grows close to Ruby Sinclair, an instructor who brought him to Houston. Ruby is preparing for an upcoming competition in Las Vegas with her partner, Julian Marshall, who is also the father of her young son, Peter.

While Rafael settles into his work, his presence creates tension for Burnett, who becomes increasingly withdrawn from the studio’s preparations, frustrating his professional partner, Patricia Black. Rafael and Burnett slowly grow closer after Rafael offers to fix Burnett’s old truck, tracking down parts for the restoration.

While looking for the pieces, during a visit to a Cuban family’s engagement celebration, Rafael reveals that he never met his father, and Ruby shares more about her life as a single mother. Despite their growing attraction, Ruby avoids pursuing a relationship, determined to focus on her dancing and to maintain a stable environment for Peter. Rafael later accompanies her to a local salsa party, where the two deepen their connection through dance. After escorting her home, Rafael meets Peter and learns about Ruby’s past with Julian. The encounter culminates in a kiss before Ruby pulls back.

At the studio, Patricia asks Rafael to rehearse with her for the competition after Burnett’s increasing distance jeopardizes their routine. Their partnership impresses the other dancers. However, Rafael overhears Burnett privately instructing Lovejoy to replace his own name with Rafael’s in the competition roster, and revealing that Ruby will be attending Las Vegas without the rest of the studio. Confused and hurt, Rafael confronts Ruby, who reiterates her refusal to enter a relationship and her desire for Peter to maintain contact with his father.

During a fishing trip shortly afterward, Burnett tells Rafael to return to Cuba after the competition and denies having a son. Devastated by this rejection, Rafael prepares to leave the United States following his performance.

At the Las Vegas competition, Rafael informs Ruby of his plan to return to Cuba. Back in Houston, Burnett regrets his treatment of Rafael and decides to travel to Las Vegas to reconcile. Rafael performs with Patricia, earning enthusiastic praise from the audience. Immediately afterward, Bea joins Rafael for a spontaneous comedic routine that delights the crowd.

Burnett arrives and apologizes to Rafael, acknowledging him as his son and urging him to remain in the United States. Meanwhile, Ruby and Julian compete and win their division, although Ruby remains distracted by Rafael’s apparent departure. Later, during an after-party, Ruby is approached by a promoter offering professional opportunities. Before she can respond, Rafael returns, and the two reunite on the dance floor. The film concludes at the studio, where the entire community dances to “You Are My Home” by Chayanne and Vanessa Williams.

== Cast ==
- Vanessa L. Williams as Ruby
- Chayanne as Rafael
- Kris Kristofferson as John Burnett
- Jane Krakowski as Patricia
- Beth Grant as Lovejoy
- Harry Groener as Michael
- William Marquez as Stefano
- Scott Paetty as Steve
- Joan Plowright as Bea

== Reception ==
On the review aggregator website Rotten Tomatoes, 51% of 43 critics' reviews are positive, with an average rating of 5.5/10. The website's consensus reads: "Shallow script, weak direction." Audiences polled by CinemaScore gave the film an average grade of "B+" on an A+ to F scale.

Roger Ebert gave the film three out of four stars, writing: "Like Strictly Ballroom and Shall We Dance, Dance With Me uses the dance scenes as a way to sneak musical numbers into a film that is technically not a musical. It sneaks in a lot more, too, and I was surprised by how much humanity Vanessa L. Williams brings to a character that could have been a cliche. This is a movie of predictable pleasures, and then it has those surprises."

=== Awards ===
Nomination

- Satellite Awards: Best Supporting Actress in a Comedy or Musical - Joan Plowright

== Film soundtrack ==
A soundtrack was released on August 11, 1998, by Sony Music.

Track listing:

No.	Title	Writer(s)	Performer	Length
1.	"Magalenha"	Carlinhos Brown	Sérgio Mendes	3:39
2.	"Heaven's What I Feel (Dance Mix)"	Kike Santander	Gloria Estefan	5:09
3.	"You Are My Home"	Diane Warren	Vanessa L. Williams and Chayanne	5:10
4.	"Jibaro (Dance With Me '98 Remix)"	León Marín "Nelson", Javier Marín "Elkin"	Electra	4:36
5.	"Fiesta Pa'Los Rumberos"	Roberto Blades, Emilio Estefan, Jr.	Albita	5:03
6.	"Want You, Miss You, Love You"	Rob Mathes	Jon Secada	4:01
7.	"Jazz Machine"	P. Landro, M. Percall	Black Machine	3:31
8.	"Echa Pa' Lante (Spanish Cha-Cha Mix)"	Roberto Blades, Emilio Estefan, Jr., Pablo Flores, Javier Garza	Thalía	3:53
9.	"Atrévete (No Puedes Conmigo)"	Manny Benito, Sergio George	DLG	4:11
10.	"Eres Todo en Mí (You're My Everything)"	Jean-Manuel De Scarano, Raymond Donnez, Leroy Gomes	Ana Gabriel	5:13
11.	"Refugio de Amor (You Are My Home)"	Warren	Vanessa L. Williams and Chayanne	5:30
12.	"Tres Deseos (Three Wishes) (12 Remix)"	Kike Santander	Gloria Estefan	5:00
13.	"Patria"	Rubén Blades	Rubén Blades	4:10
14.	"Pantera en Libertad (Radio Edit)"	Mónica Naranjo, Cristobal Sansano, José M. Navarro	Mónica Naranjo	3:26
15.	"Suavemente"	Elvis Crespo, Roberto Cora	Elvis Crespo	4:17
