= Marty Belafsky =

American actor/comedian

- Born: September 19, 1975 (age 50); Los Angeles, California
- Occupations: Television, film, stage actor

Marty Belafsky (born September 19, 1975) is an American actor/comedian born in Los Angeles, California. He began acting professionally at age 13 and was soon cast as Louis Plumb on the short-lived NBC series Hull High. Shortly thereafter, Belafsky landed the role of Crutchie in the Disney musical film, Newsies. He continued acting through his teens, making appearances in such television shows as The Wonder Years, Great Scott and Step By Step and the film Wrestling Ernest Hemingway. Belafsky also voiced Kent Swanson in the video game Dead Rising released in 2006.

== Education ==
In 1993, Belafsky took some time off from acting to attend Brown University, where he honed his comedic skills in the improvisation comedy troupe, Improvidence. Following graduation, Belafsky returned to Hollywood.

== Stand-up ==
He started doing stand-up comedy at The Laugh Factory, and was soon discovered by comedy legend, Rodney Dangerfield. Dangerfield hand-picked Belafsky to be his opening act at the MGM Grand in Las Vegas and later gave him starring roles in two of his films, Back By Midnight and The 4th Tenor.

== Films ==
Since then, Belafsky has been featured in such films as Pearl Harbor, Evolution, America's Sweethearts, Back by Midnight, Men in Black II, A Mighty Wind and Funny Money. He has also been featured on television, including a series regular role in MTV's The Lyricist Lounge Show, as well as guest appearances on Still Standing, Six Feet Under and Boston Legal. Belafsky has done over 40 commercials and continues to tour nationally throughout the U.S.

== Filmography ==
Marty Belafsky film and television credits
Year	Title	Role	Notes	Ref.
1989	The Wonder Years	Brady Ryland	1 episode	
1990	Hull High	Louis Plumb	8 episodes	
1992	Newsies	Crutchy	Theatrical film	
1992	Breaking the Rules	Young Rob	Theatrical film	
1993	Wrestling Ernest Hemingway	Ned Ryan	Theatrical film	
1992, 1998	Step By Step	Clark / Barry	2 episodes	
1997	Sabrina the Teenage Witch	Student	1 episodes	
2000	The Lyricist Lounge Show	(various)		
2001	Pearl Harbor	Louie the Sailor	Theatrical film	
2001	Evolution	Military Police	Theatrical film	
2001	Six Feet Under	Bakery Worker	1 episode	
2001	America's Sweethearts	Security Guard	Theatrical film	
2002	Men in Black II	MIB Customs Agent	Theatrical film	
2002	The 4th Tenor	Johnny	Theatrical film	
2003	A Mighty Wind	Ramblin' Sandy Pitnik	Theatrical film	
2004	Back by Midnight	Jerk Off	Theatrical film	
2004	Still Standing	Samm "Lord Hades"	1 episode	
2005	Boston Legal	Joshua Abrams	1 episode	
2006	Funny Money	Stan Martin	Theatrical film	
