= The Lyricist Lounge Show =

American sketch comedy series

- Genre: Sketch comedy
- Created by: Claude Brooks; Danny Castro; Anthony Marshall; Perry Landesberg; Jacob Septimus; Wordsworth; BabeePower
- Written by: Hugh Moore; Adam Strohl; K. Snyder; Vito Viscomi; Wordsworth; BabeePower; MasterFuol; Jeffrey Fortson; Douglas Abeles
- Directed by: Paul Casey; Terri McCoy; Sue Wolf
- Starring: Wordsworth; BabeePower; Master Fuol; Jordan Black; Marty Belafsky; Heather McDonald; Mike Ricca; Tracee Ellis Ross; Dartanyan Edmonds
- Country of origin: United States
- Original language: English
- No. of seasons: 2

Production
- Executive producers: Jim Biederman; Claude Brooks; Dan Redican, Rachel Broker, Stacy Bronte
- Producers: Danny Castro; CK Gillen; Richard G. King; Perry Landesberg; Anthony Marshall; Jacob Septimus; BabeePower
- Running time: 30 mins. (approx)

Original release
- Network: MTV
- Release: February 8, 2000 – January 1, 2001

The Lyricist Lounge Show is an American sketch comedy series that aired on MTV from 2000 to 2001 that combined hip-hop music with raps interspersed throughout the sketches. As Wordsworth, BabeePower, and Master Fuol rap on the theme song: "Welcome to the lyricist lounge show, it's rappin' and actin', laughin', clappin', lights, cameras, action, we're the first ones to ever place a sketch to a beat, it's the avenue the street where hip hop and comedy meet..." The show is also noted as the first program to feature Tracee Ellis Ross before she stars on the UPN sitcom Girlfriends.

== History ==
MTV's The Lyricist Lounge Show had its roots in New York City's "Lyricist Lounge", a hip hop show case founded by Danny Castro and Anthony Marshall, which featured up and coming musical artists, many of whom have gone on to huge success, including Sean Combs, Notorious B.I.G., and Eminem. The showcase quickly outgrew the studio apartment where it was originally held and was forced to move to larger sold-out venues which eventually led to a record deal for compilation CDs featuring Lyricist Lounge performers. A national tour followed, headlined by top hip-hop artists and showcasing unsigned talent.

The series was created by Danny Castro, Anthony Marshall, Perry Landesberg, Rawkus Records Producer DJ Etch-A-Sketch, and Jacob Septimus of the Lyricist Lounge in New York along with the creative vision of executive producers Stacy Bronte and Rachel Broker. The show was pitched as a freestyle comedy jam with skits shot on location and in a loose studio setting. This approach was pushed aside by initial executive producer Claude Brooks, a product of sitcom television acting and producing, who insisted on shooting the show live to tape, with a studio audience. This approach proved to be too expensive and time-consuming and doomed the show at the outset. During the second season, executive producer Jim Beiderman tried to modify the format to return to the creators' original premise, but by that time the show had already established itself.

== Synopsis ==
The Lyricist Lounge Show combined traditional comedic skits with the breakthrough concept of lyrical sketches, an innovative convergence of hip-hop music and theatrical narratives. Farcical comedic sketches pushed the envelope of political correctness, while lyrical acts showcased the talent of the show's resident rappers, who performed humorous vignettes with rhyming dialogue and hip hop beats. The lyrical sketches featured a variety of hip hop artists such as Q-Tip, Mos Def, Cee-Lo, Common, Tash, Snoop Dogg, Erykah Badu, Krayzie Bone, Slick Rick, MC Lyte, Rawkus Records Producer, DJ Etch-A-Sketch, and a host of others.

The ensemble cast of the series included rappers Wordsworth, Master Fuol, and Baby Power (aka BabeePower). All three were responsible for creating, writing, and producing the lyrical sketches. Def Jef appeared as a frequent collaborator. Marty Belafsky, Tracee Ellis Ross, Heather McDonald, Mike Ricca, Dartanyan Edmonds, and Jordan Black formed the comedic side of the cast, each with their own original brand of humor. Due to high production costs and conflict between the show's producers and MTV, the show lasted for only two seasons.
