= Vital Signs (1990 film) =

- Theatrical release poster
- Directed by: Marisa Silver
- Screenplay by: Larry Ketron; Jeb Stuart
- Story by: Larry Ketron
- Produced by: Laurie Perlman; Cathleen Summers
- Starring: Adrian Pasdar; Diane Lane; William Devane; Norma Aleandro; Jimmy Smits
- Cinematography: John Lindley
- Edited by: Robert Brown
- Music by: Miles Goodman
- Distributed by: 20th Century Fox
- Release date: April 13, 1990
- Running time: 103 minutes
- Country: United States
- Language: English
- Box office: $1,224,605

Vital Signs is a 1990 American comedy-drama film directed by Marisa Silver and starring Adrian Pasdar, Diane Lane and Jimmy Smits.

== Plot ==
At a Los Angeles teaching hospital, third-year medical student Michael Chatham (Adrian Pasdar) competes with fellow student Kenny Rose (Jack Gwaltney) for a coveted surgical position under chief surgeon Dr. David Redding (Jimmy Smits). Michael is the son of a prominent surgeon but is determined to succeed without relying on his father's reputation, while Kenny, from a less privileged background, becomes increasingly resentful of what he sees as Michael's advantages.

During their clinical rotations, the rivalry between Michael and Kenny intensifies as both attempt to distinguish themselves. Michael becomes involved in the treatment of Henrietta Walker (Norma Aleandro), a middle-aged schoolteacher with gastric cancer. Although impressed by his medical knowledge, Henrietta criticizes his tendency to focus more on achievement than on his patients as people, prompting Michael to reconsider his approach to medicine.

Michael also grows close to fellow student Gina Wyler (Diane Lane), who is romantically involved with surgical resident Donald Ballentine (Bradley Whitford). After Gina is deeply affected by the death of a young patient, Michael comforts her, and the two begin an affair. Gina subsequently ends her relationship with Ballentine, creating additional tension between Ballentine and Michael.

Kenny's increasing obsession with his career places a strain on his marriage to Lauren (Laura San Giacomo). Feeling neglected and excluded from his life, Lauren eventually leaves him. Meanwhile, classmates Bobby Hayes (Tim Ransom) and Suzanne Maloney (Jane Adams), longtime platonic roommates, briefly attempt a romantic relationship before deciding that they are better suited as friends.

Henrietta later undergoes surgery with Ballentine as the attending physician and Michael assisting. Following the operation, her condition deteriorates rapidly. Michael believes that she is suffering from cardiogenic shock, but Ballentine dismisses his concerns and orders a different course of treatment. Convinced that Henrietta will die without immediate intervention, Michael defies Ballentine's instructions and administers treatment himself. Henrietta's condition improves, but Michael is suspended for acting beyond his authority as a medical student.

During the subsequent disciplinary proceedings, Redding tells Michael that although his diagnosis proved correct, disregarding the medical chain of command could have had serious consequences had he been wrong. Michael's father later visits him and, rather than attempting to intervene on his behalf, tells Michael that a physician must sometimes rely on judgment developed through experience and accept responsibility for the consequences of those decisions.

Michael could argue that Ballentine's judgment was compromised by jealousy over Gina, but he declines to make the accusation. Kenny, despite knowing that Michael's suspension would improve his own chances of obtaining the surgical position, informs Redding of Ballentine's previous relationship with Gina and the possible conflict of interest. Kenny explains that he wants to compete with Michael fairly rather than benefit from his disciplinary problems.

When a tanker accident sends numerous burn victims to the hospital, Michael is temporarily brought back to help treat the casualties. His suspension is subsequently lifted after the disciplinary board determines that the unusual circumstances surrounding Henrietta's treatment mitigate his violation of hospital procedure.

Redding approves Michael for a fourth-year surgical elective, while Kenny receives a transfer to a hospital in Chicago and a recommendation from Redding for a surgical internship there. Kenny reconciles with Lauren before leaving Los Angeles. Gina and Michael remain together and move in with one another, while Suzanne transfers to a hospital in Denver and Bobby remains behind. Michael and Kenny part on amicable terms, having developed mutual respect through their rivalry.

== Cast ==
- Adrian Pasdar as Michael Chatham
- Diane Lane as Gina Wyler
- Jimmy Smits as Dr. David Redding
- Jack Gwaltney as Kenny Rose
- Laura San Giacomo as Lauren Rose
- Jane Adams as Suzanne Moloney
- Tim Ransom as Bobby Hayes
- William Devane as Dr. Chatman
- Norma Aleandro as Henrietta Walker
- Bradley Whitford as Dr. Donald Ballentine
- Lisa Jane Persky as Bobby
- Wallace Langham as Gant
- James Karen as Dean of Students
- Eric Zoltaszek as Student

== Development ==
The film was originally to have been about a country doctor.

== Release ==
=== Reception ===
Vital Signs received mixed reviews from critics. Rotten Tomatoes reports that 43% of 7 surveyed critics gave the film a positive review.

Leonard Maltin gave the film one and a half stars and wrote in his review: "Watchable, but of absolutely no distinction; stick with The New Interns, where you can at least compare the acting styles of Dean Jones and Telly Savalas. Smits effectively projects quiet authority as the surgeon instructor."

Valerie Schoen of the Chicago Tribune also gave the film a star and a half and wrote, "I have to find Vital Signs dead on arrival."

Jay Boyar of the Orlando Sentinel gave the film two stars, calling it "weak - very weak."

Janet Maslin of The New York Times also gave the film an unfavorable review, writing that the film "never has much energy of its own. The film's very basic problem is that it contains no surprising turns, and that its characters are familiar through and through."

Michael Wilmington of the Los Angeles Times wrote, "The movie has everything, which may be its problem. This brisk, whipped-up show has no rough edges."

Jay Carr of The Boston Globe criticized the film's screenplay: "Vital Signs has a much better title than last year's med school outing, Gross Anatomy. But it's not a much better movie. In fact, this coming-of-age-in-med-school film is DOA, sunk by a banal script, the kind that insists that every crisis contain the seeds of its convenient resolution."

Owen Gleiberman of Entertainment Weekly gave the film a positive review: "The movie never strays far from camp, but on its own shameless terms, it delivers."

=== Home media ===
20th Century Fox Home Entertainment released the film on DVD on June 7, 2005. The film was released on Blu-ray on October 1, 2013, by Anchor Bay Entertainment.
