= Hull High =

Television series

- Also known as: Hull Street High
- Genre: Musical teen comedy
- Created by: Gil Grant
- Written by: David Babcock; Gil Grant; Steven Hollander; Bruce Kirschbaum; Dennis E. Leoni; Shawn Schepps
- Directed by: Bruce Bilson; Kenny Ortega; Steven Robman; Bryan Spicer
- Theme music composer: Stanley Clarke; Lawrence Edwards; Peggy Holmes; Kenny Ortega
- Opening theme: "Once In a Lifetime"
- Composer: Stanley Clarke
- Country of origin: United States
- Original language: English
- No. of seasons: 1
- No. of episodes: 9 (3 unaired)

Production
- Executive producers: Peter Dunne; Gil Grant
- Producer: Bruce Kirschbaum
- Editor: Mark L. Mitchell
- Running time: 45-48 min.
- Production companies: Gil Grant Productions; Touchstone Television

Original release
- Network: NBC
- Release: August 20 – December 30, 1990

Hull High (also known as Hull Street High) is an American musical teen comedy television series which aired on NBC from August 20 to December 30, 1990. The series was created and executive produced by Gil Grant.

== Synopsis ==
Hull High told the story of Cordell Hull High School, a hip, racially diverse high school in an urban area. The series involved elements of soap opera (the ongoing and evolving relationships among teachers and students), humor, and musical dance numbers. Episodes featured The Hull High Devils, something of a rap Greek chorus, whose songs related to the episode's plot. The main adult character was history teacher John Deerborn (Will Lyman).

Similar to ABC's Cop Rock (which premiered a month after Hull High), the series' format proved unsuccessful and Hull High was canceled after six episodes due to low ratings (a total of nine episodes were produced, leaving three unaired).

== Production notes ==
The series was filmed at El Camino Real High School in Woodland Hills, Los Angeles, California. The musical numbers were choreographed by Peggy Holmes and Kenny Ortega (who also directed episodes). Songs for Hull High were written by Jon Lind, Tom Snow, and Brock Walsh. Don Was served as the series' music producer.

== Cast ==
- Will Lyman as John Deerborn
- Nancy Valen as Donna Breedlove
- George Martin as Emery Dobosh
- Harold Pruett as Cody Rome
- Mark Ballou as Mark Fuller
- Marty Belafsky as Louis Plumb
- Marshall Bell as Mr. Fancher
- Kristin Dattilo as D.J.
- Cheryl Pollak as Camilla
- Trey Parker as Hull High Devil Rapper
- Phillip DeMarks as Hull High Devil Rapper
- Carl Anthony Payne II as Hull High Devil Rapper
- Lawrence "G.Love E" Edwards as Hull High Devil Rapper
- Bryan Anthony as Hull High Devil Rapper
- Jennifer Blanc as Straight Girl
- Mark David as Mark
- Holly Fields as Michelle
- Gary Grubbs as Mr. Brawley
- Rowdy Metzger as Randy
- Daniel Fusaro as John McCoy

== Episodes ==
No.	Title	Original release date
1	"Episode 1"	August 20, 1990
2	"Episode 2"	September 30, 1990
3	"Episode 3"	October 7, 1990
4	"Episode 4"	October 14, 1990
5	"Episode 5"	December 23, 1990
6	"Episode 6"	December 30, 1990
7	"Episode 7"	TBA
8	"Episode 8"	TBA

== Awards and nominations ==
Year	Award	Result	Category	Recipient
1991	Emmy Award	Nominated	Outstanding Achievement in Main Title Theme Music	Stanley Clarke, Maureen Crowe, Lawrence Edwards, Peggy Holmes, Kenny Ortega, Charles Spellman, and David Weiss
1991	The Golden Reel Awards	Nominated	Best Best Sound Editing - Television Episodic - Dialogue & ADR	Patrick M. Griffith
1991	Young Artist Award	Nominated	Best Young Actor Starring in a New Television Series	Marty Belafsky
