= Perfect Harmony (film) =

1991 film by Will Mackenzie

- Genre: Drama; Family; Music
- Written by: David Obst
- Directed by: Will Mackenzie
- Starring: Peter Scolari; Darren McGavin; Catherine Mary Stewart; Moses Gunn; Justin Whalin; Eugene Byrd; David Faustino; Casey Ellison
- Music by: Billy Goldenberg
- Country of origin: United States
- Original language: English

Production
- Executive producers: Todd Black; Joe Wizan
- Producer: Mickey Borofsky
- Cinematography: Robert D. Yeoman
- Editor: Sidney Wolinsky
- Running time: 93 minutes
- Production companies: Sea Breeze Productions Inc. Walt Disney Television

Original release
- Network: Disney Channel
- Release: March 31, 1991

Perfect Harmony is a 1991 American historical drama film produced by Disney that is set during the Civil Rights Movement. The story highlights the racial tensions of African American people and Caucasian people within a South Carolina town and its private school. The production was filmed at Berry College, and is noted for its soundtrack which featured classical choir pieces. It was released on VHS and later on DVD.

== Plot ==
In 1959, a new teacher named Derek Sanders becomes the new choirmaster for Blanton Academy, a prestigious but all-white private school in South Carolina. Mr. Sanders tries to reduce some of the prejudice and hostility of some of the students in his choir. Paul, a bully who feels he should be lead boy, is the worst offender. Taylor Bradshaw, on the other hand, is impressed by the music of Landy Allen, an African-American boy and grandson of Zeke, the school caretaker. Taylor begins to explore the music and lives of the African-American people who live in Rivertown, despite knowing that it could get him expelled or rejected. Sanders is also impressed by Landy's abilities and attempts to get him involved with the choir. A tragedy in the community brings the race issue to a head.

== Cast ==
- Justin Whalin - Taylor Bradshaw
- Eugene Byrd - Landy Allen
- Darren McGavin - Mr. Hobbs
- Peter Scolari - Mr. Derek Sanders, the Choirmaster
- Catherine Mary Stewart - Miss Hobbs, Mr. Hobbs' daughter.
- Moses Gunn - Zeke, the campus caretaker
- David Faustino - Paul
- Casey Ellison - Orville
- Richie Havens - Scrapper Johnson
- Cleavon Little - Pastor Clarence Johnson
- Jeff Cohen - Ward
- Devin Ratray - Shelby
- Wallace K. Wilkinson - Mayor Macy
- Dan Biggers - Doctor

== Soundtrack ==
The film's soundtrack includes "All We Like Sheep" and Hallelujah chorus from Handel's Messiah, Franz Schubert's Ständchen in D Major and Schwanengesang, and Mozart's Laudate Dominum, as well as Vollendet ist das große Werk from Haydn's Creation.

In addition to the classical music featured in the film, it also features prominent spirituals such as I Shall Not Be Moved and Jesus, I Love Calling Your Name
