= He Said, She Said (film) =

1991 film by Ken Kwapi

- Directed by: Ken Kwapis; Marisa Silver
- Written by: Brian Hohlfeld
- Produced by: Frank Mancuso Jr. Vikki Williams
- Starring: Kevin Bacon; Elizabeth Perkins; Sharon Stone
- Cinematography: Stephen H. Burum
- Edited by: Sidney Levin
- Music by: Miles Goodman
- Distributed by: Paramount Pictures
- Release date: February 22, 1991
- Running time: 116 minutes
- Country: United States
- Language: English
- Budget: $15 million
- Box office: $9.8 million

He Said, She Said is a 1991 American romantic comedy-drama film directed by Ken Kwapis and Marisa Silver. It stars Kevin Bacon and Elizabeth Perkins as two journalists working in the same office and falling in love with each other. The film depicts the story of the relationship between journalists Dan Hanson (Kevin Bacon) and Lorie Bryer (Elizabeth Perkins) told twice – once from each perspective. The male story was directed by Ken Kwapis and the female story by Marisa Silver. At the time, Kwapis and Silver were engaged and they married soon after the film was released. The film was a box-office flop.

== Plot ==
Dan and Lorie are writers of obituaries and weddings, respectively, and later rival editorial page contributors at the Baltimore Sun. Shortly after starting their rivalrous, side-by-side columns, conservative Dan and liberal Lorie experience a case of opposites attracting. Close to three years after the column and their relationship commencing, a morning talk show appearance inspires a local channel to offer them a TV program. The point-counterpoint talk show will present their opposing views on various civic issues.

Their great differences cause sparks to fly and ratings to soar. One day on air, they create a great scene, which piques the public's interest, while simultaneously causing their breakup. We then see the film is split, with the first half showing us his perspective of the three years of their relationship up until the on-air scene and the second half, hers.

Dan is initially shown to be a womanizer and commitment-phobe. Early on, Lorie helps him hide from one woman he has jilted, later she sees his flirtatious interaction with women she perceives to be excessively sexily dressed and not very bright. He sees himself as a wolf, needing to be free. Then we see him mishearing and reading items on a menu, all connected to serious relationships and settling down.

As Dan and Lorie get to know one another, they both discover they have feelings for each other. She carefully orchestrates their first close encounters, making it appear that she is avoiding another man, so that he dances with her. She subtly lets him know she has just dumped her boyfriend so he knows she is available and they have dinner together.

Once they are resettled in their new office space as columnists, Lorie says she loves him, but Dan does not reciprocate. Obviously something he is not comfortable saying, he goes to a therapist but still cannot say it. Finally he tells her he loves her while she is sleeping. Unbeknownst to him, she has heard him and we see she is staggered.

We come to the fateful live scene with the mug. Moments before they step on-stage, they argue in the green room. Lorie discovers Dan had heard from Linda, and had made lunch plans with her. Jealous because of their past history, she asks if he will ever marry her and he tells her no.

On the day of what is meant to be their last show, Dan pre-records his rebuttal. Then, Lorie does a live redo response to the previous day's topic, the merger of two highways—a veiled reference to their relationship—this time saying the proposal was a bad idea. She shows that her mug is clean, alluding to an off-hand remark he made, that if she ever cleaned the bottom of her mug, he would consider their relationship a success. The studio shows Dan's prerecorded rebuttal to the proposal, likewise reversing his view, accepting the proposal. Then he directly apologizes to her, asking for another chance, reappears on stage, and they embrace.

== Cast ==
- Kevin Bacon as Dan Hanson
- Elizabeth Perkins as Lorie Bryer
- Nathan Lane as Wally Thurman
- Anthony LaPaglia as Mark
- Sharon Stone as Linda
- Stanley Anderson as Mr. Weller
- Charlayne Woodard as Cindy
- Danton Stone as Eric
- Phil Leeds as Mr. Spepk
- Rita Karin as Mrs. Spepk
- Paul Butler as Al, at the Deli
- Erika Alexander as Rita, his daughter
- Ashley Gardner as Susan
- Michael Harris as Adam
- Bruce MacVittie as Lou the Florist
- Janice Bethel Huey as Camera Operator

== Production ==
Filming took place from June to August 1990 in locations throughout the city of Baltimore including Mount Vernon and Bolton Hill, and in Baltimore County. Although the main characters worked for the Baltimore Sun, they did not film at the Sun's headquarters (then at 501 North Calvert Street). Instead they built a newsroom on a corner of the city room on the 8th floor of the Signet Tower for the scenes set at the Sun offices.

== Reception ==
On Rotten Tomatoes the film holds an approval rating of 33% based on 18 reviews, with an average rating of 5/10. In a two-star review, Roger Ebert described it as "a gentle little film that raises some questions about the different ways men and women view reality, does not answer them, and succeeds in being entertaining all the same."
