= Dunston Checks In =

- Theatrical release poster
- Directed by: Ken Kwapis
- Screenplay by: John Hopkins; Bruce Graham
- Story by: John Hopkins
- Produced by: Todd Black; Joe Wizan
- Starring: Jason Alexander; Faye Dunaway; Eric Lloyd; Rupert Everett; Glenn Shadix; Paul Reubens
- Cinematography: Peter Lyons Collister
- Edited by: Jon Poll
- Music by: Miles Goodman
- Production company: Fox Family Films
- Distributed by: 20th Century Fox
- Release date: January 12, 1996
- Running time: 88 minutes
- Countries: Canada; United States
- Language: English
- Budget: $20 million
- Box office: $9.9 million

Dunston Checks In is a 1996 comedy film directed by Ken Kwapis. The film stars Jason Alexander, Faye Dunaway, Eric Lloyd, Rupert Everett, Glenn Shadix and Paul Reubens. The film received negative reviews and was a box-office failure, grossing $9.9 million against a budget of $20 million.

== Plot ==
At the prestigious five-star Majestic Hotel, guest Lionel Spalding and his dog Neil are caught in an overflowing fountain caused by a prank by Kyle and Brian Grant, sons of the hotel's widowed manager, Robert. Although disappointed by their behavior, Robert promises the boys a vacation in Barbados, which has already been postponed twice. However, the hotel's strict owner, Elena Dubrow, cancels the trip again because of the upcoming Crystal Ball, where they expect a critic from the Le Monde Traveller Organization who could award the hotel a sixth star.

The hotel welcomes "Lord" Rutledge, a jewel thief whom Mrs. Dubrow mistakes for the expected critic. He arrives with his orangutan, Dunston, whom he has trained as a theft accomplice since birth, as he previously did with Dunston's deceased brother Samson. Rutledge cruelly controls Dunston, who longs to escape his criminal life. During one of Rutledge's schemes, Kyle accidentally releases a pulley, sending Brian down a laundry chute and allowing Dunston to escape.

Kyle discovers Dunston and befriends him, promising to protect him. Dunston's presence soon causes chaos throughout the hotel, disrupting Spalding's exercise routine and Mrs. Angela Dellacroce's massage. After Robert discovers the orangutan, he hires animal control specialist Buck LaFarge to capture him.

When LaFarge's first attempt fails, the brothers hide Dunston in the royal suite under the alias Dr. Lam Binh Ngoc. Rutledge tracks Dunston through his large banana orders, ties up and gags Kyle, and leaves him in a hotel bathtub. Dunston escapes again and heads to the Crystal Ball. Armed with photographs proving Rutledge's identity and showing him with Dunston and Samson, the boys warn their father. While Robert confronts Rutledge in the kitchen, Kyle and Brian search for Dunston while evading LaFarge and Mrs. Dubrow. The chaos culminates when Dunston pushes Mrs. Dubrow into the celebration cake.

Rutledge is arrested, and LaFarge apologizes to Dunston, who responds by punching him. Robert finally stands up to Mrs. Dubrow, who fires him. The true critic is then revealed to be Spalding, who, after enduring numerous indignities during his stay, declares that Mrs. Dubrow has reduced the hotel's rating from five stars to one.

Afterward, Mrs. Dubrow's kinder husband, Victor, arranges for the Grants to manage a Majestic Hotel in Bali, where they can keep Dunston as a pet. They offer Spalding complimentary accommodations as a peace gesture, although the gesture is undermined when Dunston drops a coconut on his head in the final scene.

== Cast ==
- Sam the Orangutan as Dunston
- Bob Bergen as Dunston (voice)
- Jason Alexander as Robert Grant, the widowed father of Kyle & Brian
- Faye Dunaway as Elena Dubrow
- Eric Lloyd as Kyle Grant, the new owner of Dunston
- Rupert Everett as Lord Rutledge
- Glenn Shadix as Lionel Spalding
- Paul Reubens as Buck LaFarge
- Graham Sack as Brian Grant, Kyle's older brother
- Nathan Davis as Victor Dubrow, Elena's husband
- Steven Gilborn as Artie
- Jennifer Bassey as Angela Dellacroce
- Frank Welker as Neil, Lionel's dog (voice)
- Bree Turner as French girl

== Production ==
Writer John Hopkins had written a spec script revolving around two young brothers living in a large, prestigious New York hotel managed by their father. Hopkins' agent shopped the script around to various studios who were uninterested in the project until producers Todd Black and Joe Wizan seeing potential in the project optioned it and hired Hopkins to re-write the script and add in the plot point of an orangutan. The project was then retitled Prime Mates and became the subject of competing bids between Paramount Pictures and 20th Century Fox with Fox eventually acquiring the script in April 1993. Dunston Checks in became one of three active monkey/ape films announced to be in development alongside Ed (then known as You Should See Them Play) at Universal Pictures and Monkey Trouble (then known as Pet) at New Line Cinema. Uncredited rewrites were provided by Eliot Wald and Andrew Kurtzman.

The animal action was detailed by the American Humane Society. Artificial animals were used in several shots.

== Release ==
The film was theatrically released on January 12, 1996. A home video release followed on May 28, 1996.

== Reception ==
On the review aggregator website Rotten Tomatoes, 17% of 18 critics' reviews are positive, with an average rating of 4.1/10. Metacritic, which uses a weighted average, assigned the film a score of 54 out of 100, based on 13 critics, indicating "mixed or average" reviews.

Desson Howe and Rita Kempley of The Washington Post referred to the film by saying "it ain't half bad", and a "plucky, prank-filled family farce" respectively. Kevin Thomas of the Los Angeles Times stated that Dunston Checks In "is a delightful and funny family film of exceptional high style", "as light as a soufflé and just as delicious", and "plays like a tribute to the resourceful, unpretentious studio productions of the past". According to an article published in the Chicago Tribune, "The cast is talented, the hide-and-seek action is silly (not killing), and the bond between a sweet little boy and the adorable ape is touching."

Audiences surveyed by CinemaScore gave the film a grade of "A" on a scale of A+ to F.

Faye Dunaway's performance in the film and in The Chamber earned her a Golden Raspberry Award nomination for Worst Supporting Actress. The film was also nominated at the 18th Youth in Film Awards (Young Artist Awards) for Best Family Feature Film: Musical or Comedy, and Eric Lloyd for Best Performance in a Feature Film - Actor Age Ten or Under. The film was successful at the box office in India, where it was dubbed in Hindi and retitled Ek Bandar Hotel Ke Andar (transl. A monkey inside the hotel).

== Home media ==
Dunston Checks In was much more successful in home video than in theaters. As of April 1997 the studio had an estimated $41.6 million in video sales, receiving 75%, greatly exceeding box office gross. The film was released by 20th Century Fox Home Entertainment on VHS on May 28, 1996. It was released on DVD on May 28, 2002, and re-released on March 18, 2014.
