= World Theatre Training Institute =

Coordinates: 52°29′37″N 13°25′11″E

The World Theatre Training Institute AKT-ZENT was originally founded in 1995 as AKT-ZENT International Theatre Centre Berlin by Artistic Director Jurij Alschitz and Programme Director Christine Schmalor. Since 2011, AKT-ZENT has operated as the principal research centre for training methods of the International Theatre Institute (ITI) – the World Organisation for the Performing Arts. In 2017, the centre was renamed the World Theatre Training Institute to reflect new tasks and objectives within their broader educational remit and sphere of influence.

== History and mode of operation ==
Since its foundation, AKT-ZENT has focused on developing new training methods and educational programmes aimed at professional actors and directors. Between 1995 and 2009, AKT-ZENT conducted a three-year modular postgraduate programme in close partnership with the Russian Academy of Theatre Arts in Moscow (GITIS). The programme was implemented in Germany, Russia and across European partner institutions in Estonia, Italy, Sweden, Norway and Greece. From 1996 onwards, the organisation has since expanded to create a comprehensive training methodology including seminars, summer school academies, practical experimentation through laboratories, festival showcases and live performances. These projects were enabled to a large extent by the European Cultural Programmes Caleidoscope, Culture 2000 and Culture 2007-2013. Specialised training programmes for acting teachers and theatre pedagogues have been advanced to create a new methodological awareness of the teaching process itself thereby helping to foster innovation in the field of theatre education and to contribute to the upgrading of drama school teaching as a profession. The bi-annual International Festival for Theatre Training Methods METHODIKA brings theatre makers together to exchange and discuss new training methods regarding teaching and rehearsal practice. Since its inception in 1999, masters of directing and teaching like César Brie, Grigory Hlady, Oleg Koudriachov, Oleg Liptsin, Iwana Masaki, Peter Oskarson, Rimas Tuminas, Anatoly Vasiliev have shared their specific approaches of actors training with colleagues.

== Research projects ==
- The World Theatre Training Library - from 2011 onwards, this project has been exploring educational traditions in their day-to-day practical forms throughout the world. On this basis, new rehearsal, teaching and training methods are collectively developed in international group laboratories and made accessible to the international theatre community.
- Teaching Professional Theatre Practice - the MA Programme for Acting and Directing Teachers was first implemented in 2012-2014 in collaboration with the Centro Universitario de Teatro at the Universidad Nacional Autonoma de Mexico. The course forms the basis for further methodological development to be implemented in various formats.
- Hybrid Theatre Training - in 2017, the institute created an online learning platform to test innovative new training formats including a specialised combination of online training and practical rehearsal tasks. The focus of methodological investigation lies on the research of specific exercises and tasks dedicated to self-education and the development of creativity. Courses on the training platform grant subscribers global access to the professional portfolio of training knowledge, as well as direct contact with the international team of teachers.
- Online Theatre Academy - in 2020, Dr Jurij Alschitz and his international team of teachers created a new platform for online courses with innovative content and experimental formats. The academy has three departments: Team of Teachers' Department, School of Jurij Alschitz and Russian Department.
