= Funny Money (2006 film) =

2006 film

- Theatrical release poster
- Directed by: Leslie Greif
- Written by: Leslie Greif; Harry Basil
- Based on: Funny Money by Ray Cooney
- Produced by: Leslie Greif; Cristian Bostanescu; Herb Nanas; Brad Siegel
- Starring: Chevy Chase; Penelope Ann Miller; Armand Assante; Christopher McDonald
- Cinematography: Bill Butler
- Edited by: Stephen Adrianson; Terry Kelley; Stephen Lovejoy
- Music by: Andrea Morricone
- Production companies: Castel Film Romania; FWE Picture Company; Thinkfactory Media; Tobebo Filmproduktions
- Distributed by: THINKFilm
- Release date: March 9, 2006
- Running time: 98 minutes
- Country: United States
- Language: English
- Budget: $10-20 million
- Box office: $31,290

Funny Money is a 2006 American comedy film directed by Leslie Greif and starring Chevy Chase, Penelope Ann Miller, and Armand Assante. It is based on the 1996 British play Funny Money by Ray Cooney. It is a co-production between Germany, the United States, and Romania.

== Synopsis ==
A couple accidentally gains possession of a briefcase containing $5 million belonging to the Romanian Mafia.

== Cast ==
- Chevy Chase as Henry Perkins
- Penelope Ann Miller as Carol Perkins
- Armand Assante as Genero
- Christopher McDonald as Vic
- Robert Loggia as Feldman
- Guy Torry as Angel
- Rebecca Wisocky as MM. Virginia
- Kevin Sussman as Denis Slater
- Alex Meneses as Gina
- Marty Belafsky as Stan Martin
- Timothy Stack as Dr. Rogers

== Production ==
In April 1998, it was reported Leslie Greif had acquired the rights to the Ray Cooney penned farce Funny Money. The film is set in Hoboken, New Jersey, and was shot in Romania.

== Release ==
ThinkFilm set a January 2007 limited release for the film in Los Angeles, San Francisco, Las Vegas, San Diego, Seattle, Dallas, and Phoenix in a cross promotion with timeshare company Consolidated Resorts. In some territories, the film was released under the title National Lampoon's Funny Money.

== Reception ==
On the review aggregator website Rotten Tomatoes, 43% of 7 critics' reviews are positive, with an average rating of 4.3/10. Metacritic, which uses a weighted average, assigned the film a score of 57 out of 100, based on 4 critics, indicating "mixed or average" reviews.
