= Sunday Drive (film) =

- Written by: Larry Brand
- Directed by: Mark Cullingham
- Presented by: The Disney Sunday Movie
- Starring: Tony Randall; Carrie Fisher; Audra Lindley; Ted Wass
- Music by: Brad Fiedel
- Country of origin: United States
- Original language: English

Production
- Executive producers: Todd Black; Joe Wizan
- Producer: Joseph Stern
- Cinematography: King Baggot
- Editor: Duane Hartzell
- Running time: 100 minutes
- Production companies: Walt Disney Television; Wizan Productions

Original release
- Network: ABC
- Release: November 30, 1986

Sunday Drive is a 1986 American made-for-television family comedy film produced by Walt Disney Television starring Tony Randall, Carrie Fisher, Audra Lindley and Ted Wass. It originally aired November 30, 1986 as a presentation of The Disney Sunday Movie on ABC.

== Plot ==
Two drivers with identical cars unwittingly take each other's vehicle while at a restaurant – one belonging to a childless couple, Bill and Joan, out on a Sunday drive with their niece and nephew (Christine and John) while their parents are away – and the other car belonging to Paul Sheridan, a young man on his way to meet his fiancé and to begin working for her father.

In Paul's car is his dog, whom Bill and Joan mistake for the children when they get into his car and drive away; and while Paul goes into their car, the children are under a blanket and he mistakenly assumes it's his dog. But when each driver eventually discovers their mistake, everyone has a hassle trying to get back together.

== Cast ==
- Tony Randall as Uncle Bill
- Carrie Fisher as Franny Jessup
- Audra Lindley as Aunt Joan
- Ted Wass as Paul Sheridan
- Hillary Wolf as Christine Franklin
- Raffi Di Blasio as John Elliot Franklin
- Claudia Cron as Susan
- Norman Alden as Norman
