= Children of a Lesser God (film) =

1986 film directed by Randa Haines

- Theatrical release poster
- Directed by: Randa Haines
- Screenplay by: Hesper Anderson; Mark Medoff
- Based on: Children of a Lesser God; 1979 play by Mark Medoff
- Produced by: Burt Sugarman; Patrick J. Palmer
- Starring: William Hurt; Marlee Matlin; Piper Laurie; Philip Bosco
- Cinematography: John Seale
- Edited by: Lisa Fruchtman
- Music by: Michael Convertino
- Distributed by: Paramount Pictures
- Release date: October 3, 1986
- Running time: 119 minutes
- Country: United States
- Languages: English; American Sign Language
- Budget: $10.5 million
- Box office: $101.5 million

Children of a Lesser God is a 1986 American romantic drama film directed by Randa Haines from a screenplay written by Hesper Anderson and Mark Medoff and based on Medoff's 1979 play. The film stars William Hurt, Marlee Matlin (in her film debut), Piper Laurie, and Philip Bosco. The film's narrative follows two employees at a school for the Deaf: a Deaf custodian and a hearing speech teacher, whose conflicting ideologies on speech and deafness create tension and discord in their developing romantic relationship.

Children of a Lesser God premiered at the 37th Berlin International Film Festival, where it competed for the Golden Bear, while Haines received a Special Silver Bear. It was theatrically released on October 3, 1986, by Paramount Pictures to critical and commercial success. Reviewers praised Haines's direction, the screenplay, and particularly the performances of Hurt, Matlin, and Laurie. The film grossed $101.5 million worldwide on a $10.5 million budget. It received five nominations at the 59th Academy Awards: Best Picture, Best Actor (for Hurt), Best Supporting Actress (for Laurie), Best Adapted Screenplay, and Best Actress (for Matlin). At age 21, Matlin became the youngest Best Actress winner as well as the first deaf winner in Oscar history.

== Plot ==
An energetic new teacher, James Leeds, arrives at a school for the Deaf and hard of hearing in New England. He soon sees a young deaf woman, Sarah Norman, working as a janitor. Sarah, a former top student, is not well regarded by the hearing staff, but seems to integrate well with the Deaf students. James begins to try to talk with her, arranging a meeting through her boss, pursuing her after school while she is attempting to clean, and persisting despite being rejected several times. She eventually agrees to go to dinner, and from the sidelines he watches her dance as she feels the music.

Sarah does not want to use her voice, and James eventually agrees not to try to force her to—a promise he later breaks. He finds out that Sarah refuses to visit her home, and assumes her mother has stopped reaching out. Through her mother, James finds out that Sarah and her sister Ruth were popular, and according to her mother her peers treated Sarah as if she was not different from other girls. Sarah later reveals that she was used by unnamed "boys", and may have been a victim of sexual abuse. Such treatment has led Sarah to mistrust men and resist interacting with anyone. Later, in a pool scene, James walks in on Sarah swimming nude. He confesses that he is falling in love with her. She seems to be afraid. He falls into the pool on purpose, which changes the mood of the interaction. They share a passionate kiss in the water, then James undresses. It is implied that they have sex that night for the first time.

The relationship between James and Sarah develops. The school superintendent warns James that he does not believe the relationship will work, but James is adamant that he will stay with Sarah because he loves her. James choreographs a dance with his deaf students, in which they lip-sync to a song on a stage in front of their parents. Sarah sees this performance and becomes upset over the fact that the students use their voices. The conflict between James and Sarah persists as she thinks James hates her for not speaking. James convinces Sarah to leave her job and move in with him, although it is not clear what her plans for the future are. James's determination to hear Sarah speak and his inability to help her to develop individual pursuits frustrates her, and she feels he is patronizing her. They split up shortly after.

Sarah leaves James and goes to live with her estranged mother, reconciling with her in the process. James chases her, but she refuses to see him. After inquiring about her, James learns Sarah is working as a manicurist. Eventually, she and James reconcile at the school prom. They decide to learn how to stay connected in between the worlds of silence and sound.

== Cast ==
- William Hurt as James Leeds
- Marlee Matlin as Sarah Norman
- Piper Laurie as Mrs. Norman
- Philip Bosco as Dr. Curtis Franklin
- Allison Gompf as Lydia
- Bob Hiltermann as Orin
- Linda Bove as Marian Loesser

== Production ==
=== Development ===
After meeting deaf actress Phyllis Frelich in 1977 at the University of Rhode Island's New Repertory Project, playwright Medoff wrote the play Children of a Lesser God to be Frelich's star vehicle. Based partially on Frelich's relationship with her hearing husband Robert Steinberg, the play chronicles the tumultuous relationship and marriage between a reluctant-to-speak deaf woman and an unconventional speech pathologist for the deaf. With Frelich starring, Children of a Lesser God opened on Broadway in 1980, received three Tony Awards, including Best Play, and ran for 887 performances before closing in 1982.

Following the vast success of his Broadway debut, Medoff, with fellow writer Anderson, penned a screenplay adapted from the original script. Though many changes were made, the core love story remained intact. The title of the film comes from the eleventh chapter ("The Passing of Arthur") of Alfred, Lord Tennyson's Idylls of the King.

=== Filming ===
The movie was shot primarily in and around Saint John, New Brunswick, during the autumn of 1985, with the Rothesay Netherwood School serving as the main set. Aside from locations in Saint John and Rothesay Netherwood School, sets were constructed by Saint John local Keith MacDonald.

== Release ==
The adaptation premiered at the Toronto International Film Festival on September 13, 1986, and was released widely in the United States on October 3 of the same year. Like its source material, the film generally gained praise from the hearing and deaf communities alike.

== Reception ==
=== Box office ===
The film opened at number five at the box office in the United States and Canada with an opening weekend gross of $1,909,084. The film stayed in the top ten for eight weeks and grossed a total of $31,853,080. Internationally it grossed $69.6 million for a worldwide total of $101.5 million.

=== Critical reception ===
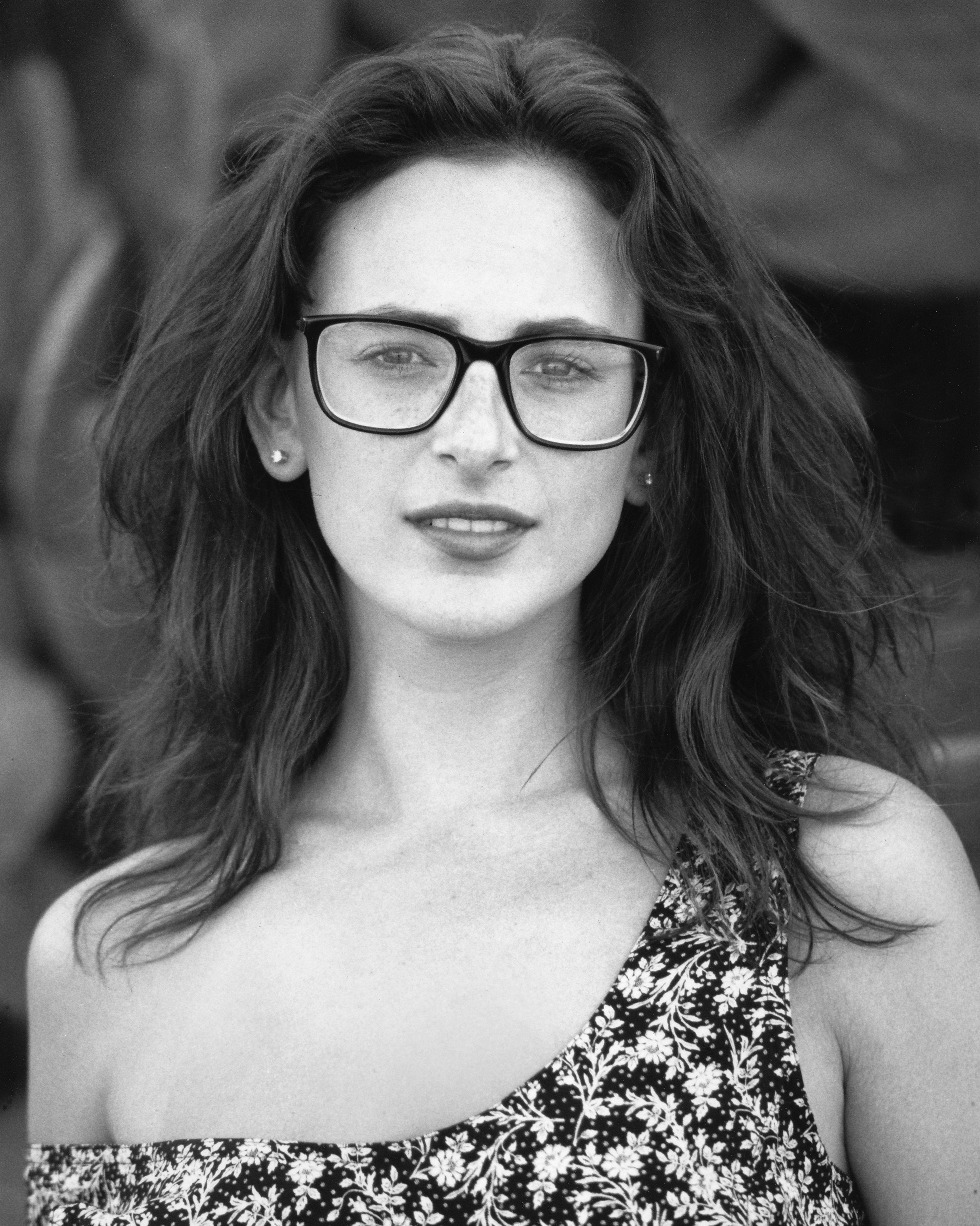
Marlee Matlin's performance received critical acclaim, earning her the Academy Award for Best Actress, making the 21-year-old the youngest winner in the category.

Children of a Lesser God received generally positive reviews. On Rotten Tomatoes, Children of a Lesser God holds an approval rating of 81% based on 36 reviews, with an average rating of 7.10/10. The site's critical consensus reads, "Children of a Lesser God transcends its transparently noble goals thanks to a pair of absorbing performances from William Hurt and Marlee Matlin." Particular praise was given to the film's two leads. Richard Schickel of Time magazine said of Matlin, "she has an unusual talent for concentrating her emotions—and an audience's—in her signing. But there is something more here, an ironic intelligence, a fierce but not distancing wit, that the movies, with their famous ability to photograph thought, discover in very few performances." Roger Ebert of the Chicago Sun-Times gave the film 3 out of a possible 4 stars, describing the subject matter as "new and challenging", saying he was "interested in everything the movie had to tell me about deafness." He continued, "The performances are strong and wonderful – not only by Hurt, one of the best actors of his generation, but also by Matlin, a deaf actress who is appearing in her first movie. She holds her own against the powerhouse she's acting with, carrying scenes with a passion and almost painful fear of being rejected and hurt, which is really what her rebellion is about." Paul Attanasio of The Washington Post said of the film, "This is romance the way Hollywood used to make it, with both conflict and tenderness, at times capturing the texture of the day-to-day, at times finding the lyrical moments when two lovers find that time stops." He goes on to say of Matlin, "The most obvious challenge of the role is to communicate without speaking, but Matlin rises to it in the same way the stars of the silent era did – she acts with her eyes, her gestures."

The film is not subtitled (neither the spoken dialogue nor the signing); instead, as Ebert observed, the signed dialogue is repeated aloud by Hurt's character, "as if to himself".

=== Awards and nominations ===
The film received five Academy Award nominations, with Marlee Matlin winning for Best Actress. Marlee Matlin was 21 years old when she won, making her the youngest Best Actress winner yet and the first deaf Academy Award winner. Children of a Lesser God was the first ever female-helmed film to be nominated for Best Picture.

Award	Category	Nominee(s)	Result
Academy Awards	Best Picture	Burt Sugarman and Patrick J. Palmer	Nominated
Academy Awards	Best Actor	William Hurt	Nominated
Academy Awards	Best Actress	Marlee Matlin	Won
Academy Awards	Best Supporting Actress	Piper Laurie	Nominated
Academy Awards	Best Screenplay – Based on Material from Another Medium	Hesper Anderson and Mark Medoff	Nominated
Berlin International Film Festival	Golden Bear	Randa Haines	Nominated
Berlin International Film Festival	Silver Bear for outstanding artistic contribution	Randa Haines	Won
Berlin International Film Festival	Reader Jury of the "Berliner Morgenpost"	Randa Haines	Won
British Academy Film Awards	Best Screenplay – Adapted	Hesper Anderson and Mark Medoff	Nominated
Directors Guild of America Awards	Outstanding Directorial Achievement in Motion Pictures	Randa Haines	Nominated
Golden Globe Awards	Best Motion Picture – Drama		Nominated
Golden Globe Awards	Best Actor in a Motion Picture – Drama	William Hurt	Nominated
Golden Globe Awards	Best Actress in a Motion Picture – Drama	Marlee Matlin	Won
Guild of German Art House Cinemas Awards	Foreign Film (Sliver)	Randa Haines	Won
Los Angeles Film Critics Association Awards	Best Actress	Marlee Matlin	Runner-up
National Board of Review Awards	Top Ten Films		7th Place
Writers Guild of America Awards	Best Screenplay – Based on Material from Another Medium	Hesper Anderson and Mark Medoff	Nominated

== See also ==
- List of films featuring the deaf and hard of hearing
- Hearing loss
