= Ken Kwapis =

American director and scriptwriter (born 1957)

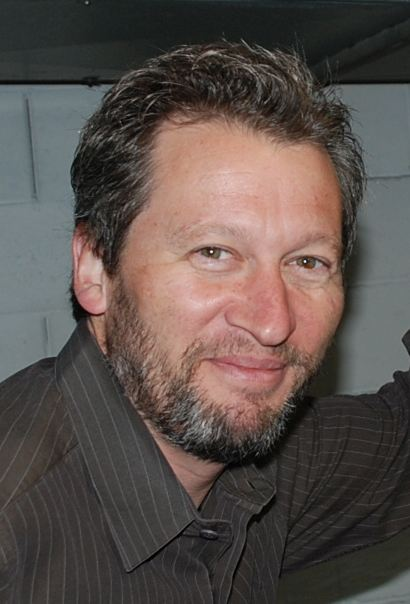
- Kwapis in Los Angeles in 2008
- Born: Kenneth William Kwapis; August 17, 1957 (age 69); East St. Louis, Illinois, U.S.
- Education: Northwestern University, University of Southern California
- Occupations: Film and television director, screenwriter, author
- Years active: 1983–present
- Notable work: Malcolm in the Middle; The Office; The Bernie Mac Show; Freaks and Geeks; Sisterhood of the Traveling Pants; He's Just Not That Into You
- Spouse: Marisa Silver
- Children: 2

Kenneth William Kwapis (born August 17, 1957) is an American film and television director, screenwriter, and author. He specialized in single-camera sitcoms in the 1990s and 2000s, famously developing and bringing the hit comedy The Office to the US audience as its primary director and executive producer, earning a Primetime Emmy Award nomination for his work.

In addition to directing feature films such as Sesame Street Presents: Follow That Bird (1985), The Sisterhood of the Traveling Pants (2005), and He's Just Not That into You (2009), his extensive television career includes helming acclaimed episodes of landmark series such as The Larry Sanders Show, Freaks and Geeks, Malcolm in the Middle, and The Bernie Mac Show.

== Early life ==
Kwapis was born in East St. Louis, Illinois, and grew up in neighboring Belleville. He is the son of Marge (née Wells) and Bruno Walter Kwapis, who was an oral surgeon. He is of Polish descent and was raised Catholic, attending the Jesuit preparatory academy at St. Louis University High School.

He earned a bachelor's degree at Northwestern University's School of Speech, after which he traveled west to enroll in the M.F.A. program at the USC School of Cinema-Television.

Kwapis' twenty-four-minute thesis film, For Heaven's Sake, won the Student Academy Award in 1982. The film is a contemporary adaptation of Mozart's one-act opera Der Schauspieldirektor (The Impresario).

== Career ==
=== 1980s ===
In 1983, Kwapis directed Revenge of the Nerd for CBS' Afternoon Playhouse, followed by Summer Switch for ABC's Afterschool Special. Starring Robert Klein, Summer Switch is an adaptation of the novel of the same name, the sequel to a young adult fantasy, Freaky Friday. For the Scholastic Book Company, Kwapis directed his first feature film, The Beniker Gang, starring Andrew McCarthy.

Kwapis' next film was Sesame Street Presents: Follow That Bird (Warner Bros., 1985). The film was the big-screen debut of the Sesame Street ensemble (Big Bird, Oscar the Grouch, The Count, Cookie Monster, Grover, Bert and Ernie, et al.). Follow That Bird tells the story of Big Bird's quest to return to his family on Sesame Street when a social worker arranges for Big Bird to move in with a family of his own kind, the Dodo Birds, in Oceanview, Illinois.

In 1987, Kwapis made his prime time television debut, directing an installment of Steven Spielberg's Amazing Stories.

Kwapis' second feature Vibes (Columbia, 1988) was made under Ron Howard and Brian Grazer's fledgling Imagine banner. Written by Lowell Ganz and Babaloo Mandel, Vibes is the tale of two psychics (Jeff Goldblum and Cyndi Lauper) who are enlisted by a fortune hunter (Peter Falk) to divine the whereabouts of a treasure hidden in the Andes. The film was shot on location in Ecuador, and features a pan pipe-flavored score by James Horner.

=== 1990s ===
Kwapis began the 1990s with a feature-film project, He Said, She Said (Paramount, 1991)—co-directed by his now-wife Marisa Silver. The film, written by Brian Hohlfeld, is a romantic comedy in which the same events are recounted twice—once from each partner's point of view. The woman's (Elizabeth Perkins) portion of the film was directed by Silver and the man's (Kevin Bacon) by Kwapis. The film also features Sharon Stone and Nathan Lane. Silver gave the film its title, based on a phrase that has been used to mean either "cross-gender discourse" or "testimony in direct conflict."

Kwapis then moved into series television, directing the pilot of HBO's comedy The Larry Sanders Show, which influenced many subsequent shows. He directed twelve episodes of the series.

Kwapis also contributed two episodes to the sci-fi series Eerie, Indiana.

Kwapis' fourth feature, Dunston Checks In (Twentieth Century Fox, 1996), stars Jason Alexander as the manager of a grand hotel in New York City, which is owned and operated by a tyrant in the Leona Helmsley mold (Faye Dunaway). An aristocrat of dubious origin (Rupert Everett) checks into the hotel with an orangutan jewel thief.

Kwapis' next film, The Beautician and the Beast (Paramount, 1997), evokes the Ruritanian comedies of Ernst Lubitsch. Fran Drescher plays a New York cosmetologist who is mistakenly hired to tutor the children of the despotic president of Slovetzia (Timothy Dalton).

In the late 1990s, Kwapis directed two episodes of NBC's short-lived cult following show Freaks and Geeks.

=== 2000s ===
In the first decade of the 2000s, Kwapis directed nineteen episodes of Fox's Malcolm in the Middle, earning a Primetime Emmy Award nomination for his work as a producer-director.

In 2001, Kwapis helped develop The Bernie Mac Show for Fox, directing the pilot and ten additional episodes, including the series finale, "Bernie's Angels". Also for Fox, Kwapis was one of the main creative forces behind Grounded for Life, a hybrid comedy combining single- and multi-camera techniques. Kwapis experimented with the form even further in the pilot of Watching Ellie, Julia Louis-Dreyfus' follow-up to Seinfeld. The distinctive pilot has a story that unfolds in real time, with an on-screen clock. Playing the role of Ellie's ex-boyfriend is Steve Carell, with whom Kwapis would shortly collaborate on his next major project.

In 2005, Kwapis was instrumental in adapting the BBC mockumentary The Office for American television under the same title, for NBC. He directed the pilot and had a significant impact on the look of the entire program—including the iconic set design. Showrunner Greg Daniels, production designer Donald Lee Harris, and he developed an open floor plan that allowed camera operators to catch characters "unaware". And they purposely created an office layout with immovable walls to emphasize its airless, claustrophobic atmosphere. Kwapis went on to direct 13 additional episodes, including the 100th episode of the series, "Company Picnic", and the series finale. His work on the third-season premiere, "Gay Witch Hunt", earned him a second Primetime Emmy Award nomination for Outstanding Directing for a Comedy Series.

For Showtime Independent Pictures, Kwapis wrote and directed Sexual Life (2005), loosely based on Arthur Schnitzler's satiric story taking place in fin-de-siècle Vienna, La Ronde. Kwapis' next feature was another adaptation, The Sisterhood of the Traveling Pants (Warner Bros., 2005), based on the bestselling young adult novel by Ann Brashares. Sisterhood, a coming-of-age story about four sixteen-year-old friends, stars Amber Tamblyn, Alexis Bledel, America Ferrera, and Blake Lively (her screen debut).

His next feature, License to Wed (Warner Bros., 2007), follows a young couple (Mandy Moore and John Krasinski), as they embark upon an unorthodox pre-marital course, devised by a highly mischievous and somewhat perverse minister (Robin Williams). Designed to determine their compatibility, the course compresses the first ten years of marriage into one week.

Kwapis' follow-up was another look at romantic entanglements, He's Just Not That into You (New Line Cinema, 2009). The film is adapted from the bestselling advice book by Greg Behrendt and Liz Tuccillo, which encouraged people to learn to read romantic signals correctly. The film stars Ben Affleck, Jennifer Aniston, Drew Barrymore, Jennifer Connelly, Kevin Connolly, Bradley Cooper, Ginnifer Goodwin, Scarlett Johansson, and Justin Long.

=== 2010s ===
Kwapis launched his seventh series and directed his tenth feature film in 2010. He was the executive producer and director of the pilot of Outsourced, a half-hour comedy for NBC. Adapted from the 2006 feature film of the same name, Outsourced tells the story of a Kansas City-based novelties company that ships all of its customer service jobs to India. The one American employee not to be fired, Todd Dempsey (Ben Rappaport), goes to Mumbai to oversee the call center.

For Working Title Films, and Universal Pictures, Kwapis directed the rescue adventure Big Miracle, starring Drew Barrymore and John Krasinski. Based on a real event that took place in 1988, the film tells the tale of a small town newsman (Krasinski) and a Greenpeace volunteer (Barrymore) who are joined by rival world superpowers to save a family of gray whales trapped in the ice of the Arctic Ocean. The film was shot during fall 2010 in Alaska and released in 2012.

In 2013, nine years after bringing the pilot to U.S. television, Kwapis directed the series finale of The Office. He also produced the half-hour Showtime pilot Happyish, written by Shalom Auslander and starring Philip Seymour Hoffman. The project stalled after Hoffman's death, but was eventually recast with Steve Coogan. It made its debut on Showtime in April 2015 and, in addition to producing, Kwapis directed four of its episodes.

In 2014, Kwapis directed the feature film A Walk in the Woods, based on the bestselling travel memoir by Bill Bryson. The film stars Robert Redford and Nick Nolte as two old friends who decide to walk the 2,100-mile Appalachian Trail. The film, which was co-produced by Redford, also stars Emma Thompson and Mary Steenburgen, and premiered at the Sundance Film Festival in January 2015. A Walk in the Woods was released by Broad Green on September 2, 2015.

Kwapis returned to single-camera half-hour comedy in 2016 and directed four episodes of Tig Notaro's semi-autobiographical Internet television series, One Mississippi—two per season in 2016 and 2017. The show was produced by Amazon Studios. For Netflix, he has directed episodes of Santa Clarita Diet, a comedy starring and produced by Drew Barrymore and first released February 3, 2017.

=== 2020s ===
In April 2020, Netflix released the first season of the show #BlackAF, created by and starring Kenya Barris, three episodes of which were directed by Kwapis. Kwapis was a guest on the July 15, 2020 episode of the podcast Office Ladies, hosted by The Office stars Jenna Fischer and Angela Kinsey, to discuss his work on The Office and, specifically, the season two finale, "Casino Night", which he directed.

An autobiographical memoir of Kwapis' career in film and television—But What I Really Want to do is Direct—was released October 6, 2020 by St. Martin's Griffin. An excerpt was published in The Los Angeles Review of Books and Entertainment Weekly and the Saint Louis Post-Dispatch featured interviews with Kwapis about it. Film academic David Bordwell favorably reviewed it, saying, the book "...ranks with Sidney Lumet's Making Movies and Alexander Mackendrick's On Film-Making, the most acute personal reflections on Hollywood directing." Kwapis has used his book as the premise for master classes at the Sundance Institute and the St. Louis International Film Festival.

Producer Greg Daniels and actor/producer Steve Carell, both of whom worked with Kwapis on The Office, hired him to direct all seven episodes of season two of Space Force, which was released by Netflix on February 18, 2022. Producer Daniels explained that they refocused the tone and emphases of the show for the second season and that they had brought Kwapis in to help achieve that goal.

Kwapis's first documentary, We Are the Shaggs, premiered at the South by Southwest festival in March 2026. It covers the Shaggs, sometimes described as the worst band of all time. Kwapis directed the four-episode revival of Malcolm in the Middle, featuring the original cast, including Bryan Cranston, Jane Kaczmarek, and Frankie Muniz. It was released on April 10, 2026 on Hulu and Disney+.

== Personal life ==
Kwapis is married to the author and film director Marisa Silver. They have two sons.

== Filmography ==
=== Film ===
Year	Title	Director	Producer	Notes
1984	The Beniker Gang	Yes	No	
1985	Follow That Bird	Yes	No	
1988	Vibes	Yes	No	
1991	He Said, She Said	Yes	No	
1996	Dunston Checks In	Yes	No	
1997	The Beautician and the Beast	Yes	No	
1999	Border Line	Yes	No	
2004	Sexual Life	Yes	No	Also writer
2005	The Sisterhood of the Traveling Pants	Yes	No	
2007	License to Wed	Yes	No	
2009	He's Just Not That into You	Yes	No	
2012	Big Miracle	Yes	No	
2015	A Walk in the Woods	Yes	No	
2026	We Are The Shaggs	Yes	Yes	Kwapis's first documentary.

=== Television ===
Year	Title	Director	Producer	Notes
1983	CBS Afternoon Playhouse	Yes	No	Episode "Revenge of the Nerds"
1984	ABC Afterschool Special	Yes	No	Episode "Summer Switch"
1987	Amazing Stories	Yes	No	Episode "Lane Change"
1992	Eerie, Indiana	Yes	No	2 episodes
1992–1993	The Larry Sanders Show	Yes	No	12 episodes
1993	Route 66	Yes	No	Episode "The Stolen Bride"
1993	Bakersfield P.D.	Yes	No	3 episodes
1998	The Wonderful World of Disney	Yes	No	Episode "Noah"
1998	Ghosts of Fear Street	Yes	No	
1999–2000	Freaks and Geeks	Yes	No	2 episodes
1999–2000	ER	Yes	No	2 episodes
2000–2004	Malcolm in the Middle	Yes	Yes	19 episodes
2001	Grounded for Life	Yes	No	4 episodes
2001–2006	The Bernie Mac Show	Yes	Yes	11 episodes
2002	Watching Ellie	Yes	Yes	3 episodes
2003	About a Boy	Yes	No	Unsold pilot
2005–2013	The Office	Yes	Executive	13 episodes
2010	Parks and Recreation	Yes	No	Episode "Galentine's Day"
2010–2011	Outsourced	Yes	Executive	2 episodes
2015	Happyish	Yes	Executive	4 episodes
2016–2017	One Mississippi	Yes	No	4 episodes
2017–2019	Santa Clarita Diet	Yes	No	5 episodes
2018	The Dangerous Book for Boys	Yes	No	Episode "How to Build a Treehouse"
2020	#BlackAF	Yes	No	3 episodes
2022	Space Force	Yes	No	7 episodes
2025	The Paper	Yes	No	Episode: "The Five W's"
2026	Malcolm in the Middle: Life's Still Unfair	Yes	Yes	All 4 episodes in a reboot of the series.
