= Marisa Silver =

American writer and film director

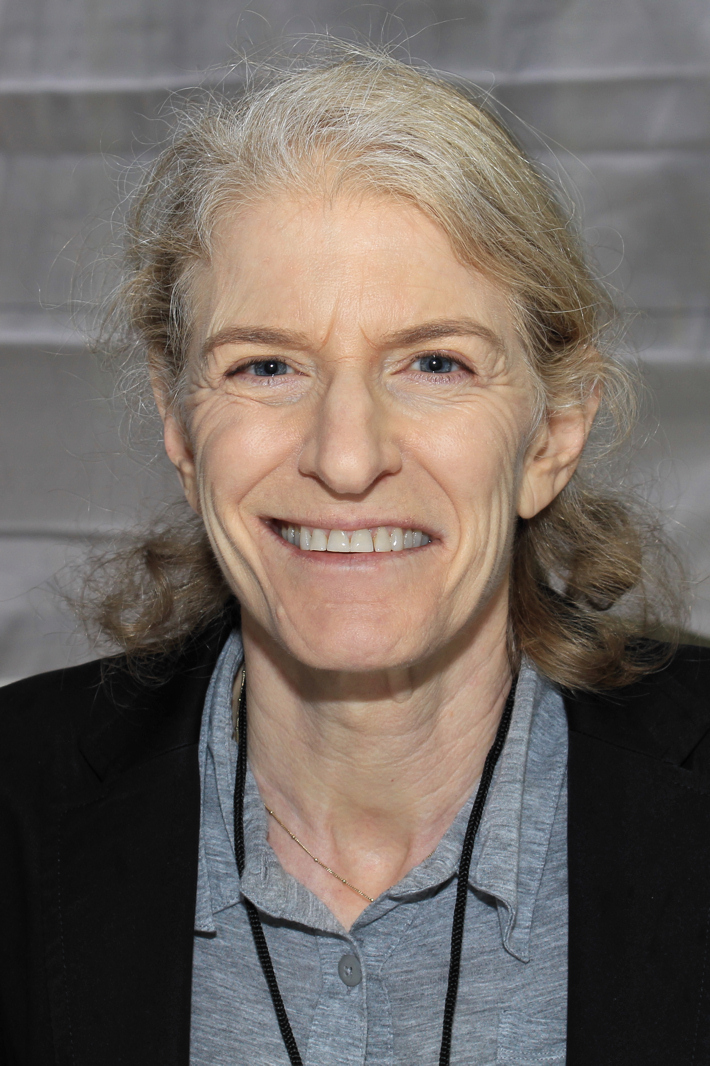
- Silver at the 2016 Texas Book Festival
- Born: April 23, 1960 (age 66); Shaker Heights, Ohio, U.S.
- Occupations: Author, film director, screenwriter
- Spouse: Ken Kwapis
- Children: 2
- Website: https://www.marisasilver.com/

Marisa Silver (born April 23, 1960) is an American author, screenwriter and film director.

== Film work ==
Silver enrolled at Harvard University and majored in Visual Studies. After assisting documentary filmmaker and MIT faculty member, Ricky Leacock, in the making of a film about the artist Maud Morgan, she dropped out of college and followed Leacock to a job at PBS.

Following her experience working on documentary films, Silver wrote a screenplay for her first feature-length fiction film, Old Enough, which was produced by her sister, Dina Silver. The film won the Grand Jury Prize Dramatic at the Sundance Film Festival in 1984, when she was 23.

She went on to direct three more feature films: Permanent Record (1988), with Keanu Reeves; Vital Signs (1990) with Diane Lane and Jimmy Smits; and He Said, She Said (1991), with Kevin Bacon and Elizabeth Perkins. The latter was co-directed with her husband-to-be, Ken Kwapis.

== Literary work ==
After making her career in Hollywood, she switched her profession and entered graduate school to become a short story writer. Explaining her change in media, she said "I felt very strongly that the stories I was telling weren't the stories I wanted to tell, that what interested me—human behavior, the nuance of character, the life that exists in shadows and moments—was not, for the most part, the stuff of film. I knew I wanted to tell stories but I had a very profound realization that I was working in the wrong medium."

Her first short story appeared in The New Yorker magazine in 2000 and subsequently several more stories have been published there.

For graduate school, Silver attended a low-residency program at Warren Wilson College, where she would later teach. She studied with Antonya Nelson, Robert Boswell, and Geoffrey Wolff. Silver said of her teachers, "More than anything, they taught me how to read like a writer, how to understand how craft is used in others work and so begin to see how I might apply it in my own work. I think it’s pretty hard to teach a person how to write, but you can teach them how to read."

Silver published the short-story collection, Babe in Paradise, in 2001. That collection was named a New York Times Notable Book of the Year and was a Los Angeles Times Best Book of the Year. A story from the collection was included in The Best American Short Stories 2001. In 2005, W. W. Norton & Company published Silver's novel, No Direction Home. Her novel The God of War was published in April 2008 by Simon & Schuster. Her second short-story collection, Alone with You, was published in 2010, and her third novel, Mary Coin, in 2013. The latter is a meditation on Dorothea Lange's iconic photograph Migrant Mother (1936).

Her novel Little Nothing was released September 13, 2016.

She was a visiting Senior Lecturer at the Otis College Graduate Writing Program in 2017 and also on the fiction faculty at Warren Wilson College. She was awarded the 2017 John Simon Guggenheim Memorial Foundation Fellowship for Fiction.

The New York Public Library selected Silver as the Mary Ellen von der Heyden Fellow of the Dorothy and Lewis B. Cullman Center for Scholars and Writers. During her residency there from 2018 to 2019, she performed research for the novel, The Mysteries, which was subsequently published by Bloomsbury on May 4, 2021. In its "New & Noteworthy" feature, the New York Times Book Review describes The Mysteries: "Family and friendship are the central mysteries of Silver's latest novel, which is set against the tumult of the early 1970s and features a fraught bond between young girls."

At Last, described by Publishers Weekly as a "resonant family drama", was published by Simon & Schuster in 2025.

== Books ==
Except as noted, all titles are novels.

- 2001: Babe in Paradise (short-story collection)
- 2005: No Direction Home
- 2008: The God of War
- 2010: Alone With You (short-story collection)
- 2013: Mary Coin
- 2016: Little Nothing
- 2021: The Mysteries
- 2025: At Last

== Personal life ==
Silver was born in Shaker Heights, Ohio, to Raphael Silver, a film director and producer, and Joan Micklin Silver, a director.

She and Kwapis have two sons. They reside in Los Angeles.
