= Randa Haines =

American film producer

- Born: Randa Jo Haines; February 20, 1945 (age 81); Los Angeles, California
- Occupations: Film director Screenwriter
- Years active: 1979 – present

Randa Jo Haines (born February 20, 1945, in Los Angeles) is an American film and television director and producer. Haines started her career as a script supervisor on several low-budget features in the 1970s, including Let's Scare Jessica to Death and The Groove Tube. She is best known for directing the critically acclaimed feature film Children of a Lesser God (1986), which starred William Hurt and Marlee Matlin, for which Matlin won the 1987 Academy Award as Best Actress, and which was nominated for 5 Academy Awards including an Academy Award for Best Picture. Haines also won the Silver Bear at the 37th Berlin International Film Festival. In 1989 she was a member of the jury at the 39th Berlin International Film Festival. In 2002 she was a member of the jury at the 24th Moscow International Film Festival.

In 1993, the company entered production, where she partnered with Wrestling Ernest Hemingway producer Todd Black, after dissolving its partnership with Joe Wizan, to form Black/Haines Productions, but the company quickly shuttered when Black started working at Mandalay Entertainment. Jason Blumenthal, who was also advisor of the Black/Haines group before he started working for Mandalay Entertainment.

Haines received a Directors Guild of America Award nomination for the film Children of a Lesser God (1986) and was nominated both for the DGA Award and an Emmy Award in 1984 for the television movie Something About Amelia.

== Filmography ==
Feature film

- Children of a Lesser God (1986)
- The Doctor (1991)
- Wrestling Ernest Hemingway (1993)
- Dance with Me (1998) (Also producer)

Ref.:

TV movies

- The Jilting of Granny Weatherall (1980)
- Something About Amelia (1984)
- The Outsider (2002)
- The Ron Clark Story (2006)

Ref.:

== Awards and nominations ==
Year	Award	Category	Work	Result	Notes
1987	Berlin International Film Festival	Silver Bear for an outstanding artistic contribution	Children of a Lesser God	Won	
1986	Directors Guild of America Awards	Outstanding Directing	Children of a Lesser God	Nominated	
1984	Directors Guild of America Awards	Best Movies For Television And Mini-Series	Something About Amelia	Nominated	
1984	Emmy Awards	Outstanding Directing In A Limited Series Or A Special	Something About Amelia	Nominated	
