= Joe Wizan =

American film producer (1935–2011)

- Born: January 7, 1935; United States
- Died: March 21, 2011 (aged 76); United States
- Occupations: Film producer, studio executive

Joe Wizan (January 7, 1935 – March 21, 2011) was an American film producer and studio executive. He was head of 20th Century Fox's motion picture division from 1983 to 1984. His credits as a producer or executive producer include Jeremiah Johnson, Junior Bonner, The Last American Hero, Audrey Rose, Along Came a Spider and Dark Night of the Scarecrow. Wizan died on March 21, 2011, at an assisted-living facility in Westlake Village, California. He was 76.

The company started its own production company in 1970. He joined CBS Theatrical Films in 1981, and left in 1982. He then joined 20th Century Fox to replace Sherry Lansing in 1983. After leaving as president of 20th Century Fox Productions in July 1984, he resumed his independent producer status at the studio and Lawrence Gordon had replaced him.

In the early 1970s Wizan attempted to make Lloyd Williams and His Brother, the first script by Walter Hill.

In 1987, Joe Wizan Productions decided to invest in a $5 million Canadian investment firm for the total financing of his company's projects over the U.S., and merged his company Sterobcar Productions, with a Canadian investment firm Black Pearl Resources, in order to start out a new company Wizan Film Properties, and that Brian Findlay would be a principal of the firm, which lined up Canadian principals in the new fund, and instead of going hat-in-hand to studios, Wizan is planning on to develop screenplays in close collaborations with writers, and to flesh out packages with stars and majors before shopping the properties to the majors.

Todd Black, who worked at Wizan's production company, later became production partner and eventually transformed Joe Wizan Productions into Wizan/Black Films in 1989. Jason Blumenthal, who was the future co-founder of Escape Artists, worked for the company while Blumenthal met Black in 1990, before Wizan and Black broke up in 1993. In 1993, Wizan and Black broke their relationship, restoring to the previous Joe Wizan Productions name. After Wizan broke up with Black, the company then partnered with Don Schneider, eventually renaming it to Phase 1 Productions. The company made hits with Kiss the Girls, and eventually the final film, Along Came a Spider.

== Filmography ==
He was a producer in all films unless otherwise noted.

=== Film ===
Year	Film	Credit	Notes
1972	Jeremiah Johnson		
1972	Prime Cut		
1972	Junior Bonner		
1973	The Last American Hero	Executive producer	
1974	99 and 44/100% Dead		
1977	Audrey Rose		
1979	Voices		
1979	...And Justice for All	Executive producer	
1982	Best Friends	Executive producer	
1983	Two of a Kind		
1984	Unfaithfully Yours		
1986	Iron Eagle		
1986	Tough Guys		
1988	Split Decisions		
1988	Spellbinder		
1990	The Guardian		
1990	Short Time	Executive producer	
1991	Becoming Colette	Executive producer	
1992	Stop! Or My Mom Will Shoot	Executive producer	
1992	Class Act	Executive producer	
1993	Fire in the Sky		
1993	Wrestling Ernest Hemingway		
1996	Dunston Checks In		
1997	Kiss the Girls		
2001	Along Came a Spider		Final film as a producer

Miscellaneous crew

Year	Film	Role
1979	...And Justice for All	Presenter
1981	Hard Feelings	Presenter
1988	Iron Eagle II	Presenter

Thanks

Year	Film	Role
1979	Natural Enemies	Special thanks
2011	Under the Bridge	Dedicatee

=== Television ===
Year	Title	Credit	Notes
1979	The Two Worlds of Jennie Logan	Executive producer	Television film
1981	Dark Night of the Scarecrow	Executive producer	Television film
1985	Silent Witness	Executive producer	Television film
1986	Sunday Drive	Executive producer	Television film
1990	El Diablo		Television film
1991	Perfect Harmony	Executive producer	Television film
1993	Official Denial	Executive producer	Television film
1999	Sealed with a Kiss		Television film

As an actor

Year	Title	Role	Notes
1989	The Preppie Murder	Mr. Maitland	Television film
