= Spellbinder (film) =

1988 film by Janet Greek

- Theatrical release poster
- Directed by: Janet Greek
- Written by: Tracy Tormé
- Produced by: Brian Russell; Joe Wizan
- Starring: Timothy Daly; Kelly Preston; Rick Rossovich
- Cinematography: Adam Greenberg
- Edited by: Steve Mirkovich
- Music by: Basil Poledouris
- Production companies: Indian Neck Entertainment; Metro-Goldwyn-Mayer; Wizan Film Properties
- Distributed by: MGM/UA Communications Co.
- Release date: September 23, 1988
- Running time: 99 minutes
- Country: United States
- Language: English
- Budget: $6 million
- Box office: $657,446 (US)

Spellbinder is a 1988 American supernatural horror film directed by Janet Greek, starring Timothy Daly and Kelly Preston. The screenplay was written by Tracy Tormé. The original music score was written by Basil Poledouris. The film was marketed with the tagline "A nightmare of illusion and betrayal".

== Plot ==
Miranda Reed is saved from an abusive boyfriend by Los Angeles attorney Jeff Mills and his lawyer friend and coworker Derek Clayton. The boyfriend makes threats at Jeff, but eventually leaves. As Miranda has no home, Jeff offers to let her stay at his. Jeff becomes romantically involved with Miranda, despite the ominous things that keep happening since he has met her. Jeff invites his coworkers to his home for a party and for them to meet Miranda. All of them like Miranda, except for Grace, Jeff's secretary, who notices Miranda's strange behaviors, e.g., referring to the winter solstice as a "holy night," and taking a turkey out with her bare hands without getting burned. Grace warns Jeff that she is "weird" and is "trouble," but he does not heed her warning. Miranda disappears after Mrs. White confronts Jeff in his office and asks Jeff to "return her to them". Jeff seeks the help of the police and Lieutenant Lee warns him that Miranda is wearing a necklace with the sign of a satanic cult suspected of murders and disappearances in the area.

Miranda eventually reappears and reveals that she belongs to the cult, a witches coven run by her ex-boyfriend and her mother was responsible for her induction into the cult. She shows Jeff her old house where rituals took place. Miranda says she wants to leave the cult and explains that the mysterious events Jeff has witnessed are part of the coven's effort to bring Miranda back into the fold. The coven's solstice ritual features a human sacrifice on a beach where the victim has to come voluntarily, which Miranda believes is to be her. When Jeff encourages her to go to the police, Miranda declines as the coven will pursue her regardless and she does not think police will believe her—and in any case, if the coven has not brought her back into their fold by the winter solstice which is the next day, Miranda will be free forever.

Based on that, Jeff agrees to help Miranda escape the coven for 24 hours, rather than go to the police. He hides her with his client Brock (who lives in a self-created fortress) while he goes to work, but the coven finds Miranda and kills Brock. When Jeff gets no dial tone response when he calls Brock, he gets into an emotional frenzy, ignores an important court appointment for a client, against the advice of a senior law firm partner, as he's frantic with worry for Miranda. Jeff breaks into Miranda's old house and coerces the current occupants who are members of the cult, to reveal Miranda's whereabouts, which is Towers Beach. Jeff and Derek rush to the beach to save Miranda. Derek claims to have called Lieutenant Lee who has sent local police to help them and he leaves to get them, while Jeff stealthily moves towards the beach, where the cult is having their ceremony, to save Miranda. Unfortunately, Jeff is spotted and captured. The coven have Miranda tied up as a sacrifice. Miranda's ex-boyfriend stabs towards her, as Jeff screams—but unexpectedly—he cuts Miranda loose rather than killing her. Miranda then stands up with a smile and confuses Jeff by seductively dancing around him, rather than running away or helping him. Before he could come to his senses, Jeff is forcefully gagged and tied up where Miranda used to be. Miranda is then robed and joins the coven in their ritual. Derek arrives on the scene at that moment with 2 police officers who take off their caps respectfully and join in the ritual.

It is now clear that Miranda is in on the plot the whole time and was only there as bait. Jeff is the real sacrifice, and Derek is the actual leader of the coven with Miranda as his co-conspirator to trap Jeff and make him voluntarily come to the sacrifice as demanded by the ritual. Miranda tells a heart broken Jeff that she knew he would come for her and teasingly kisses the gagged Jeff and slowly pulls away, showing she never loved him and he never had a chance with her. Jeff now realizes the full extent of the plot and his betrayal, but it is too late. Derek makes a final sarcastic remark that if Derek himself (as a friend) did not look out for Jeff, no one else would, and kills Jeff and takes his heart out. The film ends with Grace's funeral; she had died under mysterious circumstances involving an accident (presumably killed by the cult in order to avoid exposure). At the funeral, Lieutenant Lee questions Derek about Jeff and Derek tells him that he has no idea and that last he heard, Jeff had gone to Mexico with Miranda.

The final scene shows Miranda and Derek replaying the same scenario from the beginning of the film on a new victim, Derek's new legal client.

== Cast ==
- Timothy Daly as Jeff Mills
- Kelly Preston as Miranda Reed
- Rick Rossovich as Derek Clayton
- Audra Lindley as Mrs. White
- Anthony Crivello as Aldys
- Cary-Hiroyuki Tagawa as Lieutenant Lee
- Diana Bellamy as Grace Woods
- James Watkins as Tim Weatherly
- Kyle T. Heffner as Herbie Green
- M. C. Gainey as Brock
- Stefan Gierasch as Edgar De Witt
- Roderick Cook as Ed Kennerle
- Sally Kemp as Marilyn DeWitt
- Richard Fancy as Sgt. Barry

== Release ==
The film was given a limited release theatrically in the United States by Metro-Goldwyn-Mayer in September 1988. It grossed $657,446 domestically at the box office.

== See also ==
- List of films about witchcraft
