= Witness 11 =

- Poster
- Directed by: Sean Mitchell
- Written by: Sean Mitchell
- Produced by: Helen Jang Mitchell; Sean Mitchell
- Starring: Oleg Liptsin; Paul Guadarrama
- Cinematography: Chris Lawing
- Edited by: Sean Mitchell
- Music by: Larry Groupé
- Production company: Metaphora Studios
- Release date: 2012
- Running time: 21 minutes
- Country: United States
- Language: English

Witness 11 is a 2012 short drama film directed by Sean Mitchell and starring Oleg Liptsin, Paul Guadarrama and Matt Shelton. It is based on the testimony of renowned German poet and playwright, Bertolt Brecht, during the height of the 1940s Red Scare.

The film was shot in 2012 at the Berkeley City Club in Berkeley, California.

== Premise ==
Called before the House Un-American Activities Committee. (HUAC) during their notorious Hollywood Ten investigation, famed German playwright Bertolt Brecht must choose between betraying himself and his friends, and imprisonment. In the end, Brecht testified that he had never been a member of the Communist Party.

== Cast ==
- Oleg Liptsin as Bertolt Brecht
- Paul Guadarrama as Robert E. Stripling
- Matt Shelton as Dalton Trumbo
- Tatjana Dzambazova as Helene Brecht
- Dean Enciroli as J. Parnell Thomas
- Philip Estrin as Green
- John Scacco as Rep. Vail
- Steven Mann as Herbert Biberman
- Fritz Zimmerman as Baumgardt
- David Rosenthal as John Howard Lawson
- Bret Grantham as Bartley Crum
- Juliet Hilton as Barbara Brecht
