= Wrestling Ernest Hemingway =

- Theatrical release poster
- Directed by: Randa Haines
- Written by: Steve Conrad
- Produced by: Todd Black; Joe Wizan
- Starring: Robert Duvall; Richard Harris; Piper Laurie; Sandra Bullock; Shirley MacLaine
- Cinematography: Lajos Koltai
- Edited by: Paul Hirsch
- Music by: Michael Convertino
- Distributed by: Warner Bros.
- Release date: December 17, 1993
- Running time: 123 minutes
- Country: United States
- Language: English
- Budget: $20 million
- Box office: $278,720

Wrestling Ernest Hemingway is a 1993 American romantic drama film written by Steve Conrad and directed by Randa Haines, starring Richard Harris, Robert Duvall, Sandra Bullock, Shirley MacLaine, and Piper Laurie. The film is about two elderly men in Florida who form a friendship and the romantic relationships they have with the women in their respective lives. Wrestling Ernest Hemingway garnered mixed reviews from critics, praising the performances but criticized the overly melodramatic and sentimental direction of the plot. It was also a box-office bomb, grossing $278,720 against a $20 million budget.

== Plot ==
Francis "Frank" Joyce is a retired Irish seaman. Walter is a retired Cuban barber. They are two lonely old men living in Florida, trapped in the emptiness of their own lives.

Frank, in the buff, complains to his Lone Palm Apartments landlady, Helen Cooney, about his broken air conditioning unit. To get out of the heat, he spends hours in the book store, reading Across the River and into the Trees and brags how he once wrestled Ernest Hemingway in 1938. Ned Ryan's boss orders him chased out, so Frank goes to see Georgia at the theatre, but fails to interest her.

Walter starts his day at the Sweetwater Snack Shop & Cafe where he orders the same bacon sandwich every day, being fond of young waitress Elaine. Then it's out to the ballpark to watch a little league baseball game. "Big" Henry's dad "coaches" him, but it only serves to ruin Henry's concentration.

Disappointed that his son won't be taking him to Fort Lauderdale for his 75th birthday like he promised, Frank takes his "book and a bottle" to the park, where Walter eats his bacon sandwich and works a crossword puzzle. After several failed attempts, the flamboyant Frank is finally able to start a conversation with the introverted Walter. They have lunch at the cafe where Bernice, Elaine's co-worker, serves them. They begin to spend time together, but Frank's salty talk and crude behavior in public offend Walter and threaten their friendship.

On the bus after work, Walter mentions dancing at Oriole's Lodge to Elaine, hoping to elicit her interest, but the conversation falls silent. Frank tries again to start a romance with Georgia at the movies, while dealing with Helen who is also put off by his manner. With a new AC, Frank makes peace with Helen over "some Guinness...two old Irish dogs should not be barking at each other."

On the 4th of July, Frank and Walter peddle a tandem bicycle six miles to Carter Bay, where Elaine lives, to watch the fireworks...and feed the fish.

After another ballgame, where Henry's dad once again distracts him from playing well, Frank and Walter go their respective ways to meet lady friends; Frank strikes out. Concerned, Walter gives Frank a "respectable" haircut and shave. Despite a new suit, Frank fails once again with Georgia. Walter too is let down when Bernice tells him Elaine is moving to Pensacola to marry a Marine.

When Frank "helps" Walter buy an inappropriate going-away gift for Elaine, Walter finally loses patience with Frank's vulgarity. In return, Frank makes fun of Walter's dance practice, and they argue, exchanging parting insults; "dirty sailor" and "twinkle-toes."

While another parent berates Henry's dad for yelling at his son, Henry finally hits one into the outfield for an inside-the-park home run. Frank cheers, but Walter's nowhere to be seen. After work at the theatre, Frank visits Helen for a drink, to talk about the game, to tell his oft-told story about wrestling Hemingway...and to sleep with her, but he finally admits, "I can't do this anymore...I'm sorry Helen." He still doesn't want to be alone. Helen takes pity on him, allowing him to sleep on her sofa.

The next day, as a way of apologizing to Walter (without actually saying, "I'm sorry"), Frank teaches a young girl how to dance and tells Walter about the ball game. Then Frank takes Walter on the tandem bike so he can say a proper goodbye to Elaine. The next day, over bacon sandwiches, Walter suggests that Frank go with him to the Oriole's Lodge Stardust Dance to meet the older ladies. After dressing for the occasion, Walter and Helen find Frank, who has passed away in his sleep. Not knowing who to contact, Helen wants to call the city, but Walter tells her about Frank's son, and he finishes dressing Frank for his dignity. Walter then goes to the Stardust Dance where Latin love songs are performed by the five-piece band from Jacksonville.

== Cast ==
- Robert Duvall as Walter
- Richard Harris as Frank
- Piper Laurie as Georgia
- Sandra Bullock as Elaine
- Shirley MacLaine as Helen Cooney
- Micole Mercurio as Bernice
- Marty Belafsky as Ned Ryan
- Ed Amatrudo as Henry's Dad

== Reception ==
On Rotten Tomatoes, the film has a 60% approval rating based on 20 reviews, with an average score of 5.9/10. The site's consensus states: "Predictable but moving, Wrestling Ernest Hemingway is an understated and melancholic drama that gets plenty of mileage out of an outstanding cast that includes Robert Duvall, Richard Harris, Shirley MacLaine, and Sandra Bullock."

Roger Ebert of the Chicago Sun-Times wrote: "[T]he movie is essentially about the close observation of behavior. Like some of Hemingway's stories, the real action is all implied. The characters trade small talk, and we sense that larger issues are lurking beneath their cheerfulness." Caryn James of The New York Times gave credit to Harris and Duvall for giving "two intelligent but distant performances" and the actresses for being "appealing" in their "understandably tiny" roles, but felt the film suffers from an overlong runtime, "an easy, sentimental impulse" to its scenes and succumbs to the "scenery chewing and predictability" of its elderly-focused tale, saying "Instead of simply assuming that the old have interesting lives, the film never stops congratulating itself for being daring enough to focus on them. It shows the terrible strain of trying too hard." Louis Black of The Austin Chronicle praised Harris and Duvall's screen chemistry, and the actresses for being "outstanding" in their roles but was critical of the "superficial melodramatic stereotyping" throughout the story, saying "[I]t's another rite of passage movie that pinballs off of clichés as though that is a way to achieve meaning. But there are those performances." Ty Burr of Entertainment Weekly gave the film a C grade, saying it "feels canned and inert" with Haines' direction and Michael Convertino's score turning the male bonding scenes into "swollen epiphanies" when compared to the "richly funny observations" in Grumpy Old Men, adding that Harris gives "a gutsy performance in a gutless movie."
