= Oleg Liptsin =

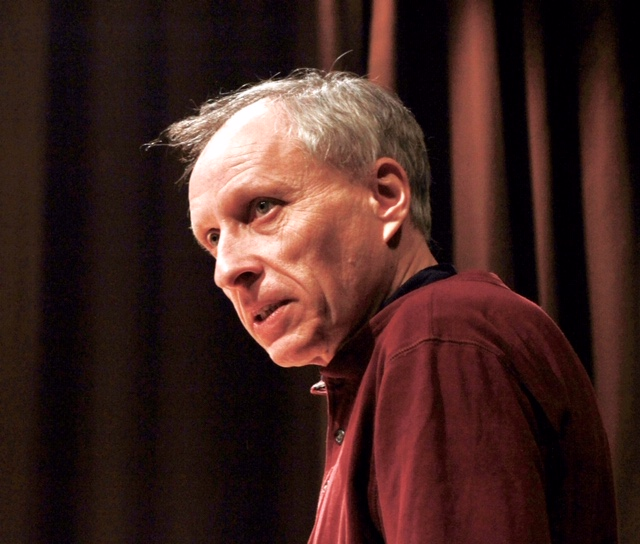
Oleg Liptsin

Oleg Liptsin (born 1960 in Kyiv, Soviet Union), is a theatre director and professor of drama.

== Life and work ==
Liptsin studied theater at Russian University of Theatre Arts, GITIS, in Moscow with Anatoly Vasiliev and Mikhail Butkevich. He worked as an actor and assistant director at the renowned Moscow State Theatre "School of Dramatic Arts" Théâtre de l'Europe under artistic direction of Anatoly Vasiliev. For several years Liptsin performed in the worldwide production of Six Characters in Search of an Author by Luigi Pirandello.

In 1989 Oleg Liptsin established one of the first independent theatre ensembles in Ukraine, TheaterClub/Kyiv, which became a leading experimental and avant-garde theatre laboratory in the country. TheaterClub/Kyiv has developed its own acting style based on the Russian improvisational tradition established by Michael Chekhov and revised in our times by Mikhail Butkevich. While practicing and exploring modern acting techniques, TheaterClub/Kyiv produced more than a dozen of award-winning plays and experimental theatre projects, presented not only in Ukraine but also in Austria, Poland, Canada, Russia, USA and Spain. These productions, directed by Liptsin, including ANTIGONE by Sophocles, ME by Mykola Khvylovy, ULYSSES by James Joyce, THE OLD WOMAN by Nikolai Gogol and Daniil Kharms, were presented at numerous international festivals.

In early 90-th Oleg has started his directing and teaching career abroad, first in Europe and later in America. In 1991 - a short-term residence in Shaubuhne (West Berlin) while Luc Bondy directed "The Winter's Tale". In 1993 - experimental theater/installation project KUSMA based on Andrey Platonov in Upper Austria. In 1993-94 - teaching at Konrad Wolf Film and TV Institute in Potstdam/Babelsberg, Germany. In 1995 - visiting teacher at the National School of Drama in Delhi, India.

From 1995 Liptsin began working in the USA and later in Canada, from 2003 - in Paris, since 2010 - in Taiwan. He directed and co-produced MARRIAGE and THE NOSE by Nikolai Gogol, CHERRY ORCHARD and THREE SISTERS by Anton Chekhov, OUTCRY by Tennessee Williams, THE ELEPHANT MAN by Bernard Pomerance, NOTES FROM UNDERGROUND by F.Dostoevsky, LIVING CORPSE by L.Tolstoy in San Francisco, GILGAMESH in Canada, acted in M.Gorky's THE LOWER DEPTHS, S.Beckett's HAPPY DAYS and ENDGAME. He developed and conducted the post-graduate educational program in Directing at Kyiv National I. K. Karpenko-Kary Theatre, Cinema and Television University, worked as professor of drama in Slavic University (Moscow), gave lectures in various universities in Taiwan. In 2011 Oleg edited and published a 2 volume collection of works by his teacher M.Butkevich (GITIS Publishing House).

Mr. Liptsin was awarded the National Award for Experimental Work in Theatre by the Theatre Union of Ukraine, won the "Best Director" award and 4 nominations for "Best Director" and "Best Actor" in Ukraine, participated in more than 30 international festivals. He holds the PhD in Art History (Theater Arts).

Oleg Liptsin's most recent directing credits include: DEMIURGE based on his own adaptation of Bruno Schultz' short novels at the National I.Franko Drama in Ukraine, MEDEA by Euripides at National Molody Theater in Kyiv, ENDGAME by S.Beckett in San Francisco, OVERCOAT by N.Gogol and COLLECTOR inspired by J.Fowles' novel in Taipei. He recently starred as Bertolt Brecht in the short fiction film WITNESS #11 (dir. Sean Mitchell).

In recent years, Mr. Liptsin has been working as a freelance director and Professor of Drama in different parts of the world. He is also the leader and founder of METATHEATER - a post-graduate educational program for actors/directors and production groups.
