= Dead Ringers (miniseries) =

2023 American television miniseries

- Promotional poster
- Genre: Drama; Psychological thriller
- Based on: Dead Ringers by David Cronenberg Twins by Bari Wood by Jack Geasland
- Developed by: Alice Birch
- Starring: Rachel Weisz; Britne Oldford; Poppy Liu; Jennifer Ehle; Michael Chernus
- Composer: Murray Gold
- Country of origin: United States
- Original language: English
- No. of episodes: 6

Production
- Executive producers: James G. Robinson; David Robinson; Barbara Wall; Anne Carey; Polly Stokes; Erica Kay; Stacy O'Neil; Sean Durkin; Ali Krug; Sue Naegle; Megan Ellison; Rachel Weisz; Alice Birch
- Cinematography: Jody Lee Lipes; Laura Merians Gonçalves
- Editors: Lisa Lassek; Affonso Gonçalves
- Running time: 52–64 minutes
- Production companies: Astral Projection; Morgan Creek Entertainment; Annapurna Television; Amazon Studios

Original release
- Network: Amazon Prime Video
- Release: April 21, 2023

Dead Ringers is an American psychological thriller drama television miniseries developed by Alice Birch. It is based on the 1988 film of the same name by David Cronenberg, itself adapted from the 1977 novel Twins by Bari Wood and Jack Geasland. The series premiered on Amazon Prime Video on April 21, 2023. The series won a Peabody Award at the 84th ceremony in June 2024.

== Cast and characters ==
=== Main ===
- Rachel Weisz as Beverly and Elliot Mantle, twin gynecologists. They are gender-flipped versions of the characters portrayed by Jeremy Irons in the 1988 film.
- Britne Oldford as Genevieve Cotard, an actress and Beverly's love interest
- Poppy Liu as Greta Leung, the Mantles' assistant and housekeeper
- Jennifer Ehle as Rebecca Parker, an investor in the Mantles' birthing center and laboratory
- Michael Chernus as Tom, Elliot's lab assistant

=== Recurring ===
- Jeremy Shamos as Joseph
- Emily Meade as Susan Parker
- Kitty Hawthorne as the acting double for Beverly and Elliot Mantle opposite Rachel Weisz
- Natalie Woolams-Torres as Heather

=== Guest ===
- Susan Blommaert as Agnes
- Liza Fernandez as Lenka
- Andrew Garman as the grief support group leader
- Suzanne Bertish as Linda
- Maryann Urbano as Sasha
- Aaron Dean Eisenberg as Jeremy
- Soji Arai as Ju Won
- Enoch Suho Lee as Translator
- Allyson Kloster as Mckenzie
- Kevin R. McNally as Alan
- Tony Crane as Nick
- Michael McKean as Marion
- Ntare Guma Mbaho Mwine as Silas Jordan
- Erica Sweany as Florence

== Episodes ==
No.	Title	Directed by	Teleplay by	Original release date
1	"One"	Sean Durkin	Alice Birch	April 21, 2023
In Manhattan, twin gynecologists Beverly and Elliot Mantle, dubbed the Mantle twins, frequently commit malpractice at the hospital where they work, while harboring a plan to establish their own independent birthing center. During one of their hospital sessions, Beverly meets Genevieve, a famous actress. Elliot successfully seduces Genevieve while posing as Beverly, which effectively brings Beverly and Genevieve into a relationship, with Genevieve having slight doubts. The twins manage to convince Rebecca Parker, a venture philanthropist, to fund their birthing center scheme, despite earlier failed delivery at the hospital. Beverly is revealed to be schizophrenic while experiencing the most recent of many miscarriages; Elliot expresses sociopathic behaviors and instigates several sexual encounters with strangers. Elliot has a mental breakdown when Beverly tells her that her relationship with Genevieve is serious.
2	"Two"	Sean Durkin	Ming Peiffer	April 21, 2023
3	"Three"	Karena Evans	Rachel De-lahay	April 21, 2023
4	"Four"	Lauren Wolkstein	Miriam Battye	April 21, 2023
5	"Five"	Karyn Kusama	Susan Soon He Stanton	April 21, 2023
6	"Six"	Sean Durkin & Lauren Wolkstein	Alice Birch	April 21, 2023

== Production ==
=== Development ===
In August 2020, it was announced Amazon Prime Video had given a straight-to-series order to a television series based upon David Cronenberg's 1988 film Dead Ringers, with Annapurna Television set to produce, and Alice Birch set to serve as head writer and executive producer. Sean Durkin, Lauren Wolkstein, Karena Evans and Karyn Kusama directed episodes of the series.

=== Casting ===
Upon the initial announcement, it was revealed Rachel Weisz would star in the series. In July 2021, it was announced Michael Chernus had joined the cast as a series regular. In August 2021, it was announced Poppy Liu and Britne Oldford had joined the cast as series regulars, with Jeremy Shamos, Jennifer Ehle and Emily Meade set to recur.

=== Filming ===
Principal photography began by August 2021 in New York City.

== Release ==
The series had its world premiere at the 2023 Canneseries on April 15, competing for Long Form competition. All six episodes of the series were released on April 21, 2023.

== Reception ==
On the review aggregator website Rotten Tomatoes, 85% of 87 critics' reviews are positive, with an average rating of 7.7/10. The website's consensus reads: "If Dead Ringers doesn't wield as cutting a blade as David Cronenberg's original chiller, it's not a pale imitation either, thanks to Rachel Weisz putting on a clinic in doppelgänger duplicity." Metacritic, which uses a weighted average, assigned a score of 79 out of 100 based on 24 critics, indicating "generally favorable reviews".

The series was included in several mid-year lists of the best TV shows of 2023, such as The Guardian, Time and Variety. Alison Herman of Variety wrote, "Rachel Weisz has the dual role of a lifetime as the Mantle twins. [ . . . ] Gender-swapped reboots too often carry a whiff of sanctimony, but [the series] is as perverse and profane as any great Cronenberg homage. [ . . . ] Dead Ringers is more than a gimmick; it’s a cerebral spin on a nightmare."

=== Accolades ===
Year	Award	Category	Nominee(s)	Result	Ref.
2023	Peabody Awards	Entertainment	Dead Ringers	Won	
2024	Astra TV Awards	Best Actress in a Streaming Limited or Anthology Series or Movie	Rachel Weisz	Nominated	
2024	Golden Globe Awards	Best Actress – Miniseries or Television Film	Rachel Weisz	Nominated	
2024	Primetime Creative Arts Emmy Awards	Outstanding Cinematography for a Limited or Anthology Series or Movie	Jody Lee Lipes (for "One")	Nominated	
2024	Satellite Awards	Best Actress in a Miniseries, Limited Series, or Motion Picture Made for Television	Rachel Weisz	Won	
