= In Dreams (film) =

1999 film by Neil Jordan

- Theatrical release poster
- Directed by: Neil Jordan
- Screenplay by: Bruce Robinson; Neil Jordan
- Based on: Doll's Eyes by Bari Wood
- Produced by: Charles Burke; Redmond Morris; Stephen Woolley
- Starring: Annette Bening; Aidan Quinn; Stephen Rea; Robert Downey Jr.; Paul Guilfoyle
- Cinematography: Darius Khondji
- Edited by: Tony Lawson
- Music by: Elliot Goldenthal
- Production company: Amblin Entertainment
- Distributed by: DreamWorks Pictures
- Release date: January 15, 1999 (United States)
- Running time: 100 minutes
- Country: United States
- Language: English
- Budget: $30 million
- Box office: $17 million

In Dreams is a 1999 American psychological thriller film directed by Neil Jordan. It is an adaptation of the novel Doll's Eyes (1993) by Bari Wood. The film stars Annette Bening, Robert Downey Jr., Aidan Quinn, and Stephen Rea. Its screenplay was co-written by Jordan and screenwriter Bruce Robinson. Filming took place at various locations throughout New England as well as on the Baja California Peninsula.

In Dreams was released in the United States on January 15, 1999, by DreamWorks Pictures. On a reported budget of $30 million, the film grossed $17 million at the box office, making it a box-office bomb. It received varied reviews from critics, with several praising its visuals and Bening's performance, while others criticized its lack of narrative coherence.

== Plot ==
Claire Cooper is a suburban housewife and mother, who, in her free time, illustrates children's stories. Her husband, Paul, is an airline pilot, and is frequently away from home due to work (and possibly an affair with an Australian co-worker), leaving Claire to care for their eight-year-old daughter, Rebecca. Claire begins experiencing bizarre, vague dreams involving an underwater city and the murder of a young girl. Shortly after, Rebecca goes missing during an outdoor school play, and is later found dead at the bottom of a reservoir.

Believing these dreams she has had since girlhood may be premonitory, Claire attempts to involve herself in the police investigation, but is met with increasing resistance. Her dreams and visions intensify, and she believes she is witnessing the movements of her daughter's murderer, a serial killer named Vivian Thompson. She uncovers that the underwater city she has experienced in her dreams is a former town, Northfield, that was flooded when the reservoir was formed.

The visions drive Claire to the brink of insanity, and she seeks help from a psychologist, Dr. Silverman, who diagnoses her as psychotic. She is subsequently committed to a psychiatric institution after slitting her wrists, but remains plagued by visions, including one of Vivian murdering Paul. When she experiences another vision of Vivian kidnapping another girl, Claire manages to escape from the institution, hoping to stop him from claiming another victim. She steals the vehicle of a security guard, and tracks Vivian to an abandoned fruit factory situated along the lake.

Upon arriving at the factory, she is met by Vivian and the young girl, Ruby. The childlike Vivian, who was severely abused as a boy by his mother, kidnaps little girls to be his "playmates"; when they resist, he becomes enraged and kills them. He holds Claire hostage at the factory, and wants her and Ruby to stay with him as his "new family". Police manage to track Claire to the factory, where they have a face-off with Vivian, holding a gun to Claire's head. While a SWAT team attempts to snipe Vivian from a helicopter, he chases Claire along a bridge crossing a tributary waterfall, knocking both her and himself over the guardrail. Claire and Vivian plunge below the falls. In the water, Claire has a vision of being reunited with her daughter before drowning.

Later, Vivian, who survived the fall, is committed to the same psychiatric institute where Claire had been incarcerated. While lying in his bed, he has horrific visions of Claire's spirit haunting him and the phrase "Sweet dreams, Vivian" being scrawled in blood on the ceiling. The phrase emerges across the walls of his cell, and he screams in horror.

== Cast ==
- Annette Bening as Claire Cooper
- Katie Sagona as Rebecca Cooper
- Aidan Quinn as Paul Cooper
- Robert Downey Jr. as Vivian Thompson
  - Geoffrey Wigdor as young Vivian Thompson
- Paul Guilfoyle as Det. Jack Kay
- Kathleen Langlois as Snow White
- Jennifer Holly Berry as Hunter
- Amelia Claire Novotny as Prince
- Kristin Sroka as Wicked Step-Mother
- Robert Walsh as Man at School Play
- Denise Cormier as Woman at School Play
- John Fiore as Policeman
- Ken Cheeseman as Paramedic
- Dennis Boutsikaris as Dr. Stevens
- Stephen Rea as Dr. Silverman
- Margo Martindale as Nurse Floyd
- June Lewin as Kindly Nurse
- Pamela Payton-Wright as Ethel
- Krystal Benn as Ruby
- Dorothy Dwyer as Foster Mother

== Production ==
=== Screenplay ===
The film is ostensibly based on the 1993 novel Doll's Eyes, by Bari Wood, even though the finished film and screenplay bear practically no resemblance at all to the book, with the exception of the protagonist being a well-to-do woman who abhors her psychic abilities, which put her in contact with a serial killer to whom she becomes mentally linked. The project originated as a script titled Blue Vision, written by Bruce Robinson. Neil Jordan came aboard to direct the film as one of the first projects at DreamWorks, having worked with David Geffen on his previous three films. Jordan rewrote the script and re-titled it In Dreams. Commenting on what the film's overarching theme was, Jordan stated: "I don't think the world behaves in a rational manner, but we all write about it and talk about it as if it does. I think that's what a lot of stories I've told have been about. How people try and make sense of their own lives with the tools available like logic and a sense of consequence, and these forces erupt into lives that make no sense."

=== Filming ===
Filming took place between August 1997 and December 1997. It was shot at multiple locations in New England, including several Massachusetts cities: Northampton (at the Northampton State Hospital and Smith College), Southampton, Northfield, and Florence. Additional photography took place at the Wentworth by the Sea in New Castle, New Hampshire. The underwater sets were created and filmed at 20th Century Fox studios on the Baja California Peninsula, in the same water tank used for the underwater portions of James Cameron's Titanic (1997). The film's production budget was approximately $30 million.

In Dreams was a collaboration between Amblin Entertainment and DreamWorks Pictures, both companies Steven Spielberg was involved with. When the film began shooting, DreamWorks still hadn't released any films yet, although by the time it wrapped they had released their inaugural film The Peacemaker, which was moderately successful. Actress Annette Bening collaborated with DreamWorks again in late 1998, for the Oscar-winning film American Beauty. Following his 1996 drug arrest, Robert Downey Jr. had been clean for most of 1997, successfully completing roles in Two Girls and a Guy, The Gingerbread Man and U.S. Marshals earlier that year without any issues. For Two Girls and a Guy (one of the first post-arrest roles) he was drug-tested on the set every day, and it has been claimed that roles such as these helped him temporarily stay clean. However, when filming In Dreams during September 1997, he relapsed into drugs, and was eventually arrested again in December 1997. He would later be allowed temporary leave from jail to do post-production work on In Dreams.

Cinematographer Darius Khondji applied filters on the camera lenses to achieve lush accents on the film's autumnal imagery, noted by critic Nick Pinkerton as "hysterical and hyper-real."

== Release ==
=== Box office ===
In Dreams was released in the United States on January 15, 1999, across 1,670 theaters. During its opening weekend, it grossed $3,992,449, ranking at number 11 at the U.S. box office. It had a final gross of $11,927,682 in the United States and Canada and a worldwide gross of $17 million.

=== Critical reception ===
The film holds a 25% rating on Rotten Tomatoes, based on 51 reviews, with an average rating of 4.8/10. The site's consensus states: "Some interesting visuals, but the movie is as confusing as a dream." Audiences polled by CinemaScore gave the film an average rating of "C−" on an A+ to F scale.

Janet Maslin of The New York Times praised the film's cinematography and Bening's performance, summarizing: "At heart In Dreams is just a campfire story, and a pretty loony one at that. But Neil Jordan has directed it furiously, with a lush, insinuating visual style that gets right under the skin." Some critics, such as Roger Ebert of the Chicago Sun-Times, commented on the film's dubious plot, deeming it "the silliest thriller in many a moon, and the only one in which the heroine is endangered by apples. She also survives three falls from very high places (two into a lake, one onto apples), escapes from a hospital and a madhouse, has the most clever dog since Lassie and causes a traffic pileup involving a truck and a dozen cars."

Jack Mathews of the Los Angeles Times likened the film to A Nightmare on Elm Street (1984), but criticized it for its lack of realism. However, Mathews praised the film's underwater visual sequences, noting that they "have the haunting atmosphere typical of Jordan's past horror films," and wrote that "Bening works this role like a sore muscle, or a tooth that needs pulling. It's a courageous, anti-glamour effort, one of those sweat-and-drool "Snake Pit" performances that drives hair and makeup crazy, not to mention mental-health-care providers." The Washington Post's Desson Howe similarly praised Bening for "an exhausting, breakout performance," as well as the film's "surrealistic" visuals. Owen Gleiberman of Entertainment Weekly awarded the film a C-minus rating, deeming it a "dismayingly schlocky and literal-minded thriller." Emanuel Levy of Variety characterized the film as "dark, scary and uncompromising," and surmised that criticisms would result from the film's "convoluted narrative with a downbeat tone and shockingly unconventional ending, which doesn’t provide the genre’s customary pay-off."

Co-writer Robinson criticized the film the year after its release, stating: "It was a complete and utter mess from top to bottom. I thought Jennifer Eight was a low point, but Christ almighty, this hit the floor and dug." In a retrospective review, critic Nick Pinkerton referred to the film as "a fundamentally miscalibrated movie of rather piquant badness, the work of a preternaturally talented hack, if such a thing can exist."

Film scholar Maria Pramaggiore notes In Dreams as one example in Jordan's filmography in which popular songs are employed to "disestablish time and place to convey the notion of time as a cyclical process." Pramaggiore also stresses the importance of the uncanny in the film, citing it as one of several in Jordan's filmography—along with The Miracle (1991) and The Butcher Boy (1997)—in which "dreams assume the status of reality.

== Home media ==
DreamWorks Home Entertainment released the film on VHS and DVD during 1999. It also received a domestic LaserDisc release on August 17, 1999, making it one of the last films to be released on the format in the United States. In February 2006, Viacom (now known as Paramount Skydance) acquired the rights to In Dreams and all 58 other live-action films DreamWorks had released since 1997, following their $1.6 billion acquisition of the company's live-action assets. In February 2022, Paramount Home Entertainment released the film on Blu-ray for the first time. The film was also made available on Paramount's subscription streaming service Paramount+, as well as on their free streaming service Pluto TV.

== Soundtrack ==
The soundtrack to In Dreams was released on January 12, 1999. The release was handled by soundtrack specialty label Varèse Sarabande, rather than by DreamWorks' own in-house label DreamWorks Records, which was primarily focused on rock and pop artists. Songs are by Elliot Goldenthal featuring London Metropolitan Orchestra, except where noted.

No.	Title	Artist	Length
1.	"Agitato Dolorosa"		4:59
2.	"Claire's Nocturne"		2:38
3.	"Pull of Red"		2:07
4.	"Appellatron"		3:33
5.	"Wraith Loops"		3:27
6.	"Rubber Room Stomp"		2:00
7.	"Pulled by Red"		1:11
8.	"Scytheoplicity"		2:26
9.	"In Dreams"	Roy Orbison	2:50
10.	"Rebecca's Abduction"		4:32
11.	"Premonition Lento"		1:42
12.	"While We Sleep"		2:36
13.	"Don't Sit Under the Apple Tree (with Anyone Else but Me)"	The Andrews Sisters	2:17
14.	"Andante"		3:38
15.	"Elegy Ostinato"		4:11
16.	"Dream Baby"	Elizabeth Fraser	4:30
Total length:			49:27

== Works cited ==
- Ocker, J.W. (2010). The New England Grimpendium. Woodstock, Vermont: The Countryman Press. ISBN 978-1-581-57862-1.
- Pramaggiore, Maria (2008). Neil Jordan. Champaign, Illinois: University of Illinois Press. ISBN 978-0-252-07530-8.
