= Bari Wood =

American writer (born 1936)

- Born: Bari Eve Prosterman; December 31, 1936 (age 89); Jacksonville, Illinois, US
- Education: Northwestern University
- Occupation: Author
- Spouse(s): Gilbert Congdon Wood; Dennis Preston Kazee
- Writing career
- Genres: Suspense, science fiction, horror
- Notable work: The Killing Gift

Bari Wood (born December 31, 1936) is an American author of science fiction, crime and horror novels.

== Life and work ==
Wood was born on December 31, 1936, in Jacksonville, Illinois, to Israel S. Prosterman and Gertrude Ritman. She grew up in and around Chicago, and graduated from Northwestern University in Evanston, Illinois with a degree in English. She moved to New York in 1957, where she first worked in the library of the American Cancer Society, later as editor of the society's publication, CA: A Cancer Journal for Clinicians and of the medical journal Drug Therapy. In the early 1970s, she began writing fiction.

In New York she fell in love with and married Dr. Gilbert Congdon Wood (1915–2000), a biologist for the American Cancer Society. In 1981 they moved to a farmhouse in Ridgefield, Connecticut. In 2008, she married Dennis Preston Kazee and moved to Lansing, Michigan.

Wood wrote her first novel, The Killing Gift, in 1975. It won the Putnam Prize for high-quality novels. It was followed by Twins, co-written with Jack Geasland in 1977. In 1988, the novel was adapted into a film under the title Dead Ringers with Jeremy Irons in the eponymous lead roles. Her 1993 novel Doll's Eyes was adapted into a film titled In Dreams in 1999.

== Fiction ==
| Year | Title | Notes |
|---|---|---|
| 1975 | The Killing Gift | |
| 1977 | Twins | with Jack Geasland (re-released in 1988 as Dead Ringers) |
| 1981 | The Tribe | |
| 1984 | Lightsource | |
| 1986 | Amy Girl | |
| 1993 | Doll's Eyes | |
| 1995 | The Basement | |

== Films and television ==
| Year | Title | Notes |
|---|---|---|
| 1988 | Dead Ringers | Directed by David Cronenberg. Based on Twins aka Dead Ringers. |
| 1999 | In Dreams | Directed by Neil Jordan. Based on Doll's Eyes |
| 2023 | Dead Ringers | Prime Video. Based on Twins |
