= Frank Jones (politician) =

American politician

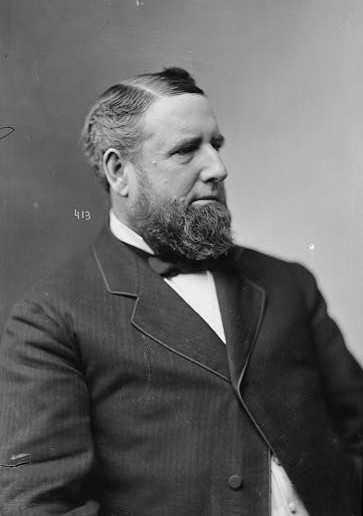

Member of the U.S. House of Representatives from New Hampshire's 1st district
- In office March 4, 1875 – March 3, 1879
- Preceded by: William B. Small
- Succeeded by: Joshua G. Hall

Mayor of Portsmouth, New Hampshire
- In office 1868–1869
- Preceded by: John Henry Bailey
- Succeeded by: Joseph B. Adams

Personal details
- Born: September 15, 1832 Barrington, New Hampshire, U.S.
- Died: October 2, 1902 (aged 70) Portsmouth, New Hampshire, U.S.
- Party: Democratic
- Occupation: Businessman, politician

Frank Jones (September 15, 1832 – October 2, 1902) was a United States representative from New Hampshire representing the 1st Congressional District from 1875 to 1879. He was the mayor of Portsmouth, New Hampshire, in 1868 and 1869.

== Biography ==
Frank Jones was born in Barrington, New Hampshire, on September 15, 1832. He attended the public schools in Barrington. He moved to Portsmouth in 1849 and became a successful merchant and brewer. He owned businesses in Portsmouth and South Boston, Massachusetts.

Jones, the mayor of Portsmouth in 1868 and 1869, elected as a Democrat to the Forty-fourth and Forty-fifth Congresses (March 4, 1875 – March 3, 1879) was not a candidate for renomination in 1878. He was the unsuccessful Democratic candidate for Governor of New Hampshire in 1880, losing to Republican Charles Henry Bell by only a few thousand votes, 44,432 to 40,813.

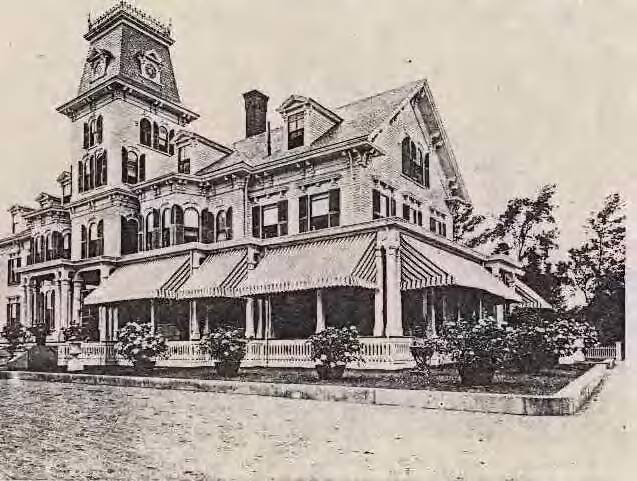
Jones Mansion in Portsmouth, NH

Later, Jones became involved with the Republican Party. He was disgusted over William Jennings Bryan's stand on Free Silver. He became interested in railroads and hotels. Jones rebuilt the stately Rockingham Hotel in Portsmouth and enlarged the Hotel Wentworth (now Wentworth-by-the-Sea) in New Castle. Also in Portsmouth, Jones built a mansion in the Second Empire style, with gardens and a horse track, completed in 1876. He was a presidential elector on the Republican ticket in 1900. He died in Portsmouth, New Hampshire, on October 2, 1902, and was buried in Harmony Grove Cemetery.

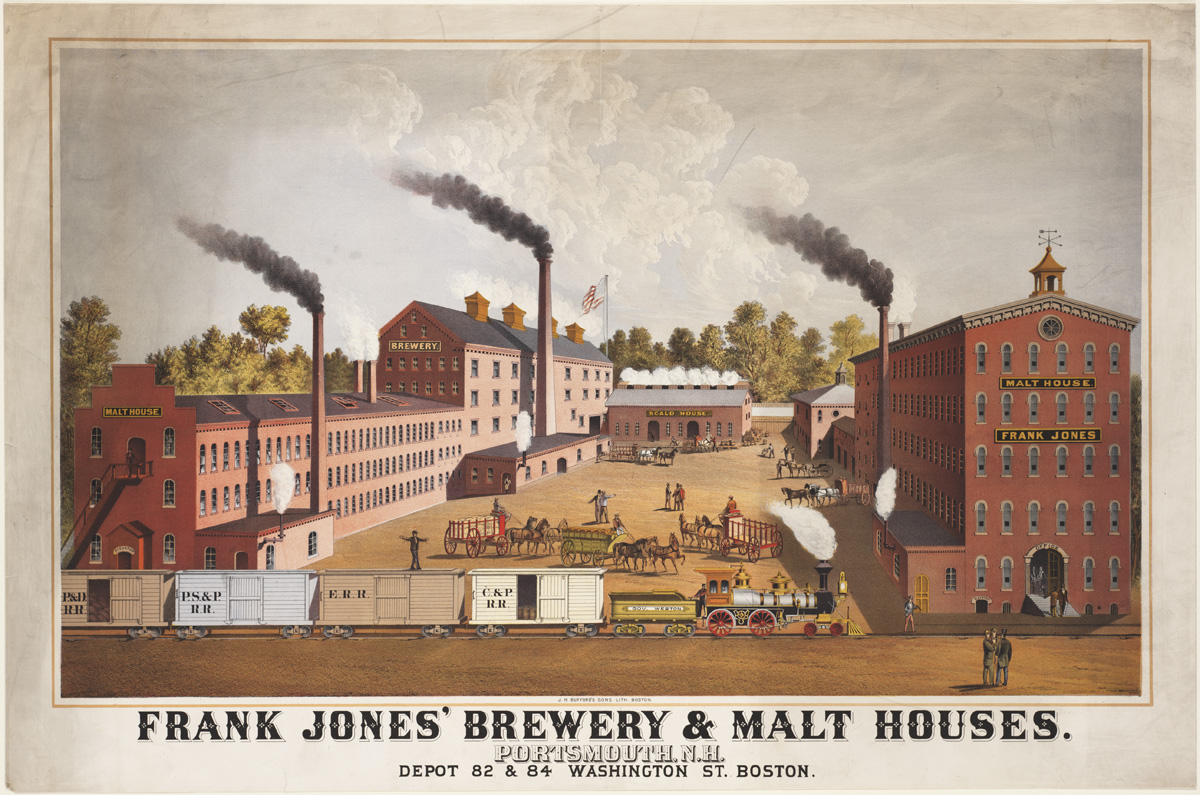
Frank Jones' Brewery

The Frank Jones Brewery was one of the largest producers of ale in the United States of America. In 1896, Jones' Portsmouth brewery produced about 250,000 barrels a year. In 1889, Jones put his company's stock on the market in London. The new company was incorporated on May 17, 1889. In 1950, the Frank Jones Brewery closed after 90 years.

== See also ==
- List of mayors of Portsmouth, New Hampshire

== Notes ==
Party political offices
Preceded by Frank A. McKean	Democratic nominee for Governor of New Hampshire; 1880	Succeeded by Martin V. B. Edgerly
U.S. House of Representatives
Preceded by William B. Small	U.S. Representative for the 1st District of New Hampshire; March 4, 1875 – March 3, 1879	Succeeded by Joshua G. Hall
