= Wentworth by the Sea =

Resort hotel in New Hampshire, United States

Coordinates: 43°3′36″N 70°43′34″W

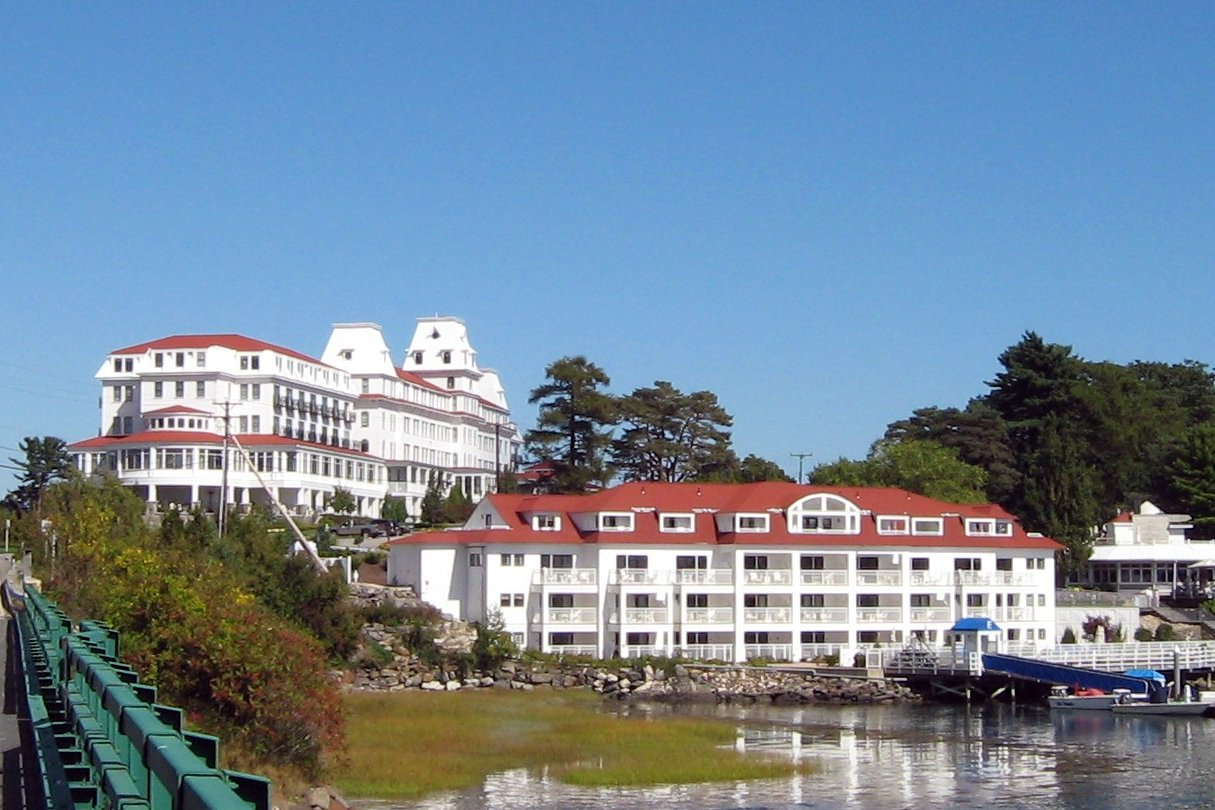
- Interactive map of the Wentworth by the Sea area

General information
- Location: New Castle, New Hampshire, 599 Wentworth Rd
- Opening: 1874
- Owner: Ocean Properties Hotels and Resorts
- Operator: Opal Collection Hotels & Resorts

Other information
- Number of rooms: 161

The Wentworth by the Sea is a historic grand resort hotel in New Castle, New Hampshire, United States. It is one of a handful of the state's surviving Gilded Age grand hotels, and the last located on the seacoast. The Wentworth by the Sea is a member of Historic Hotels of America, the official program of the National Trust for Historic Preservation.

== History ==
The Wentworth was built in 1874 by Daniel Chase, a distiller from Somerville, Massachusetts, and for the first two years was named Wentworth Hall. It was bought by Frank Jones in 1879 and expanded in the Second Empire style. With Jones's death, the hotel was sold in 1902.

In 1905, the hotel housed the Russian and Japanese delegations who concluded the Treaty of Portsmouth to end the Russo-Japanese War. U.S. President Theodore Roosevelt suggested the peace talks, and won the Nobel Peace Prize for his actions. Both delegations were welcomed at no charge, with Frank Jones' executor Judge Calvin Page providing hospitality as Jones' will stipulated he should. The final document was signed at the Portsmouth Naval Shipyard where formal negotiations took place, but the final language of the treaty was drafted, and the armistice ending the fighting, was signed at The Wentworth.

After a number of owners, Harry Beckwith bought the hotel in 1920 and ran it for 25 years. In 1946, it was acquired by Margaret and James Barker Smith for $200,000. On July 4, 1964, Emerson and Jane Reed became the first African-Americans to overcome the hotel's segregation policy, dining at its restaurant.

With declining fortunes and changing owners, the hotel closed in 1982. Multiple decaying wings and additions were demolished, shrinking the resort to half its previous size, leaving only the historic main wing surviving. A local group, Friends of the Wentworth, formed and tried to preserve the hotel. When they were unable to locate sufficient support, Alan Green, president of the Green Corporation (which owned the hotel at that time), announced the planned demolition of the remaining portion of the hotel in 1995.

Attention was drawn to the plight of the Victorian hotel when it appeared on the National Trust for Historic Preservation's (NTHP) list of America's Most Endangered Places, and the History Channel's America's Most Endangered in 1996. This postponed the demolition sufficiently to identify a buyer, and Ocean Properties, a Portsmouth-based hotel management company, acquired the property in 1997.

The hotel's surviving main wing was completely restored, with new wings constructed on either side. The hotel reopened on May 16, 2003, owned and managed by Ocean Properties, but operating as a Marriott franchise, Wentworth by the Sea, A Marriott Hotel & Spa. The Wentworth by the Sea is a member of the National Trust for Historic Preservation's Historic Hotels of America.

The hotel left Marriott on March 1, 2023 and joined the Opal Collection chain as Wentworth by the Sea.

The now-independent Wentworth by the Sea Country Club is home to the golf course that was initially designed by George Wright in 1897, enlarged by Donald Ross in 1921, and further expanded to 18 holes by Geoffrey Cornish in 1964. The Wentworth Marina is also independently operated and welcomes Wentworth hotel guests.

== In Media ==
While the hotel was vacant, it was used as a haunted setting for the 1999 film, In Dreams, starring Robert Downey, Jr. and Annette Bening.

== Gallery ==
Wentworth by the Sea

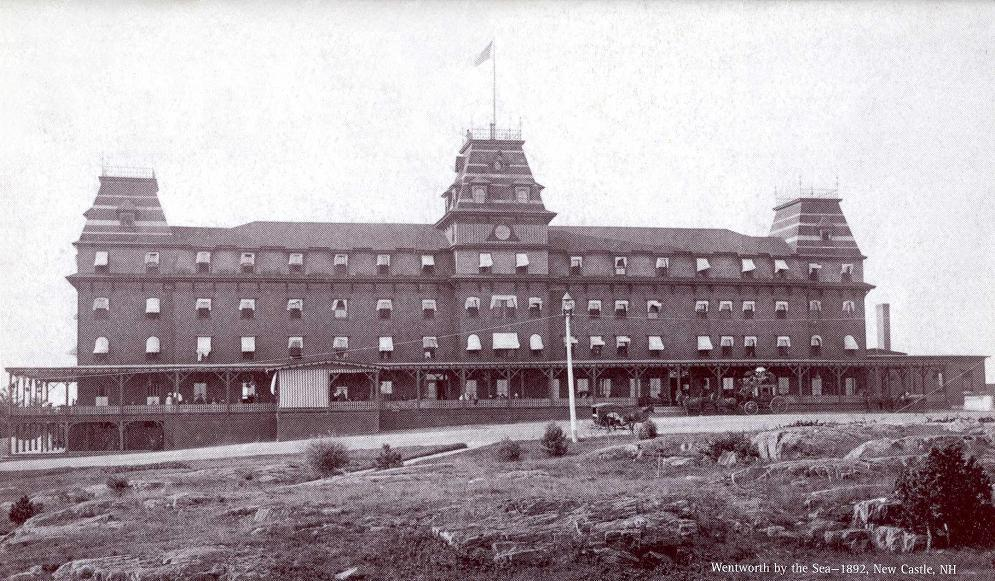
The original main wing of the Wentworth in 1892

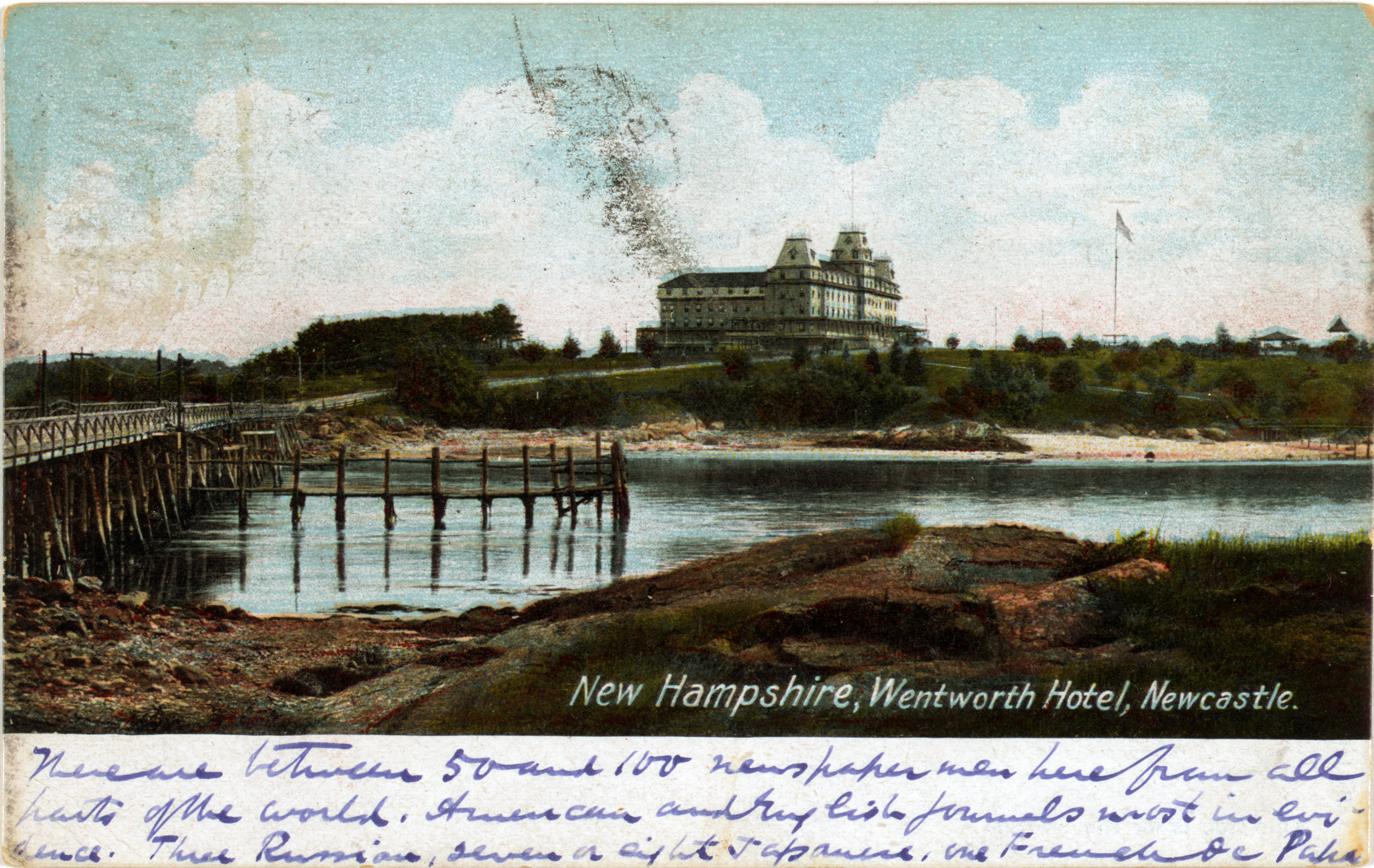
Hotel Wentworth, 1905

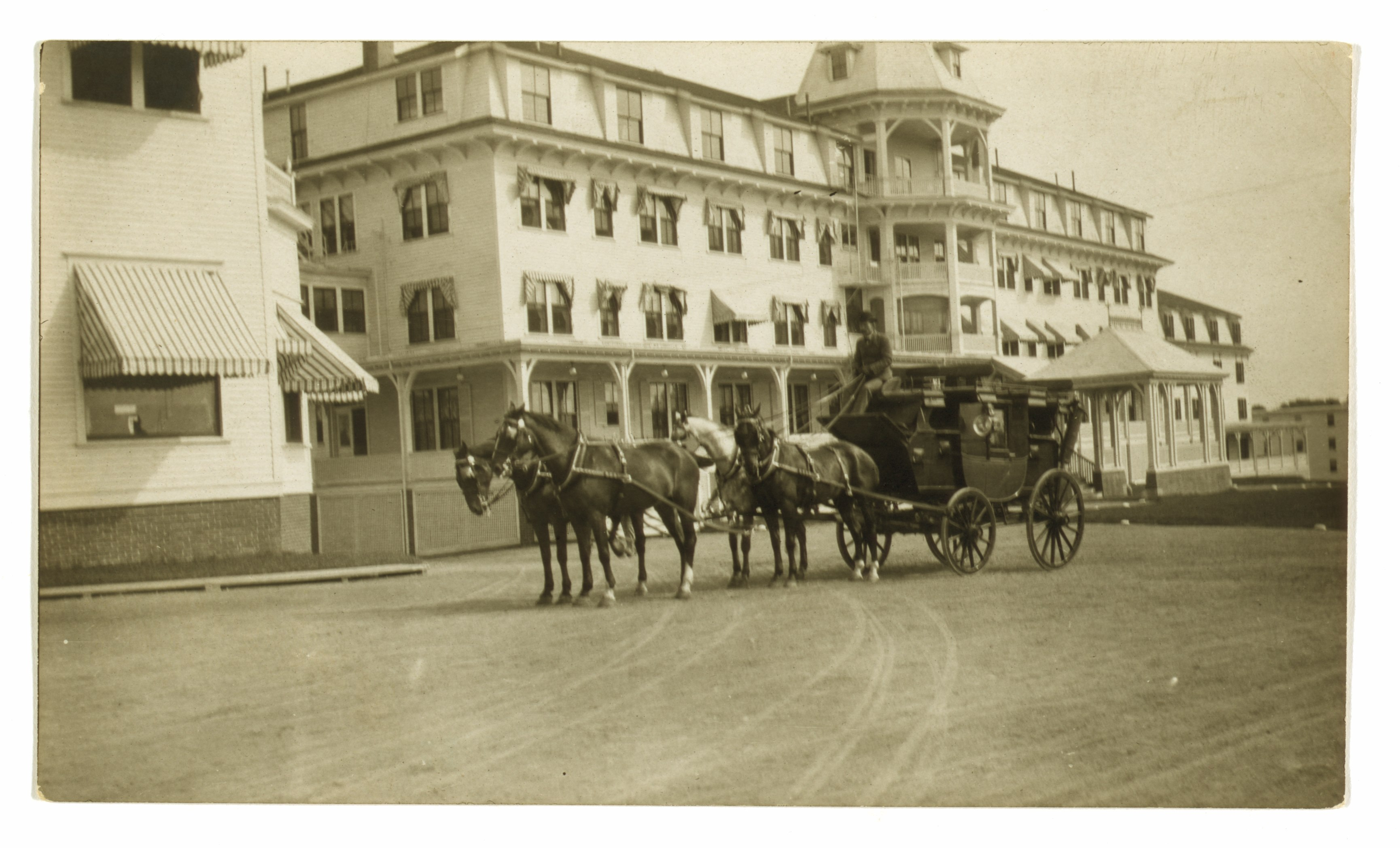
A Talley-Ho coach in front of The Wentworth, 1905

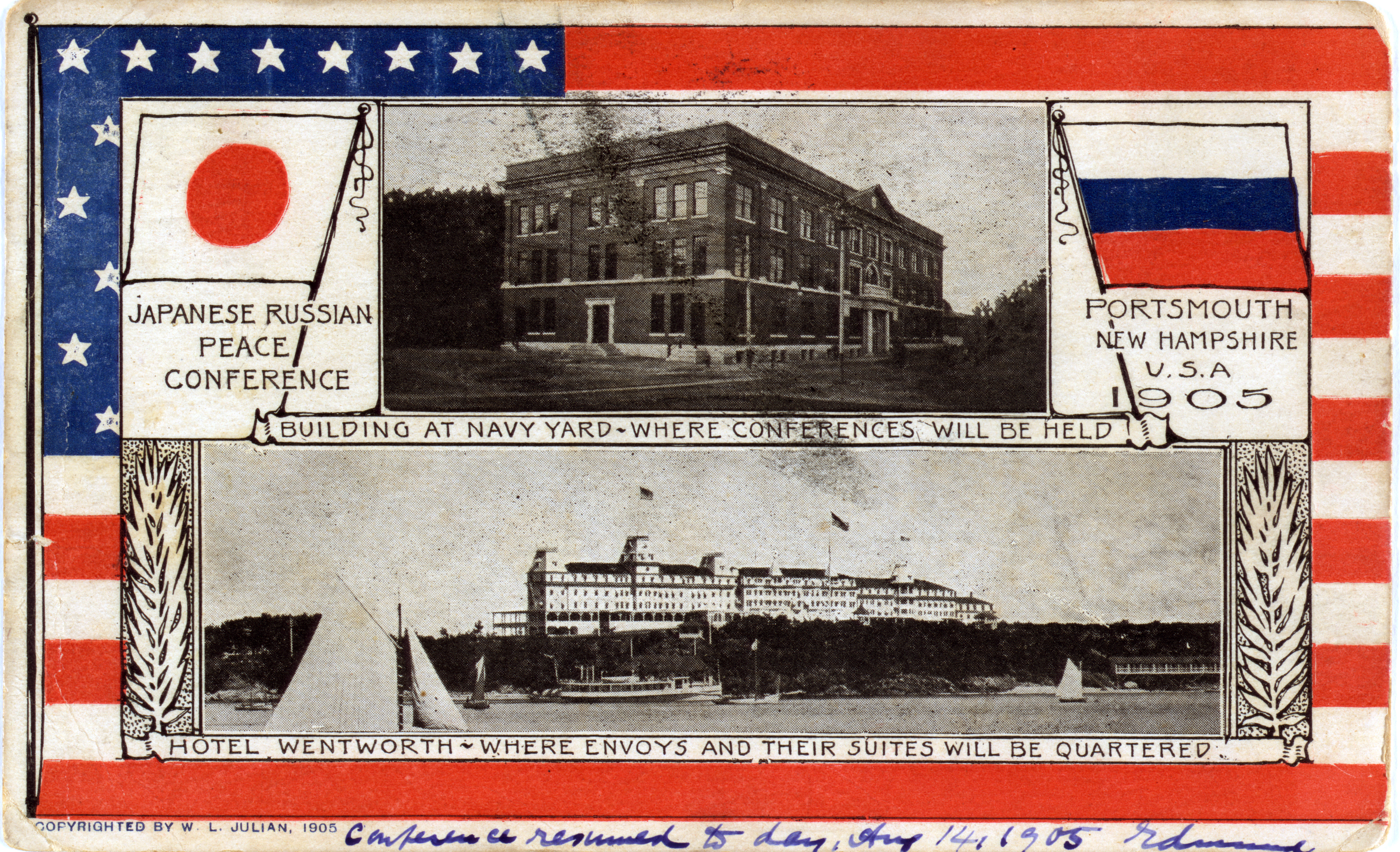
Postcard commemorating the Treaty of Portsmouth, 1905

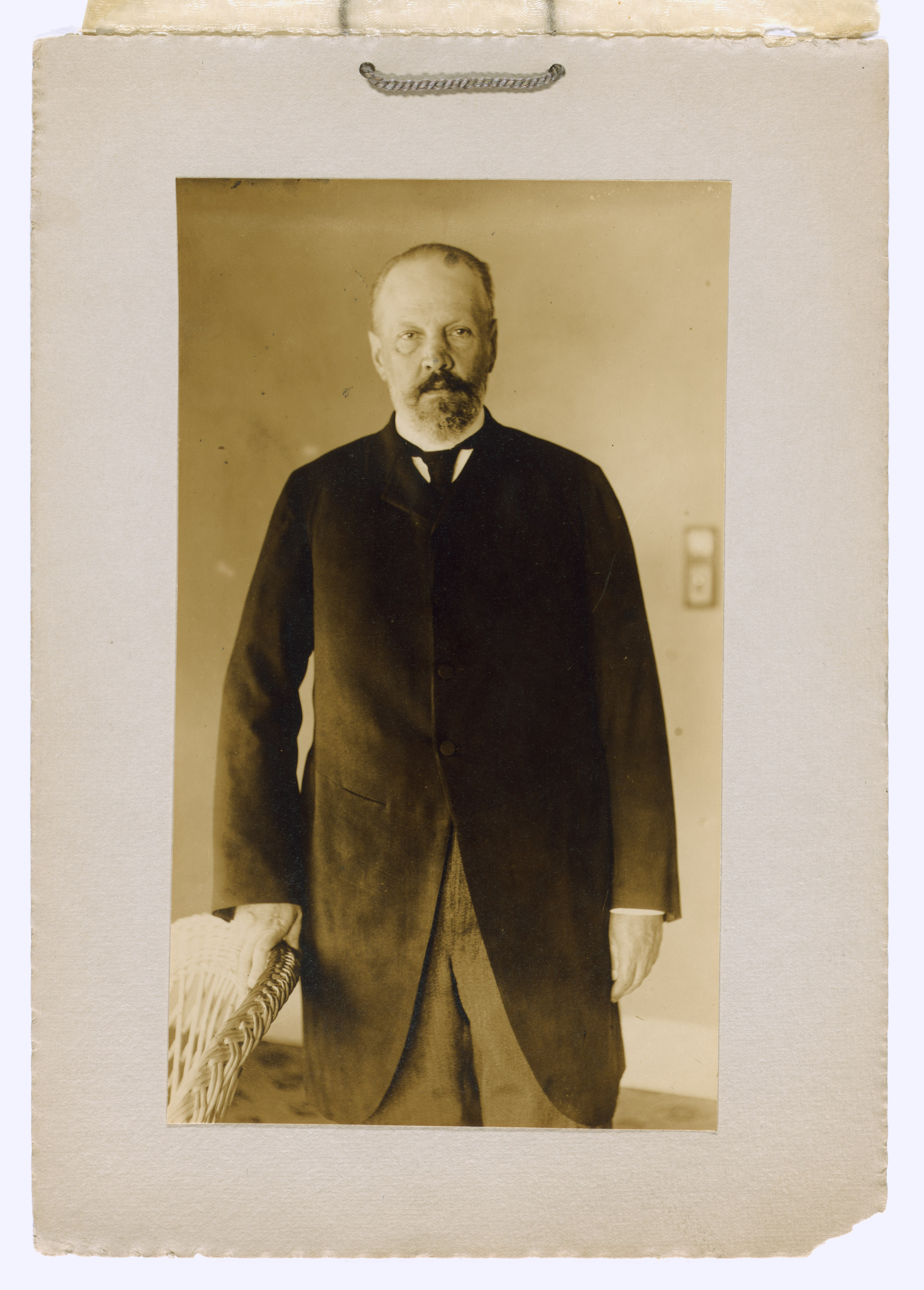
Count Witte in his room at The Wentworth, 1905

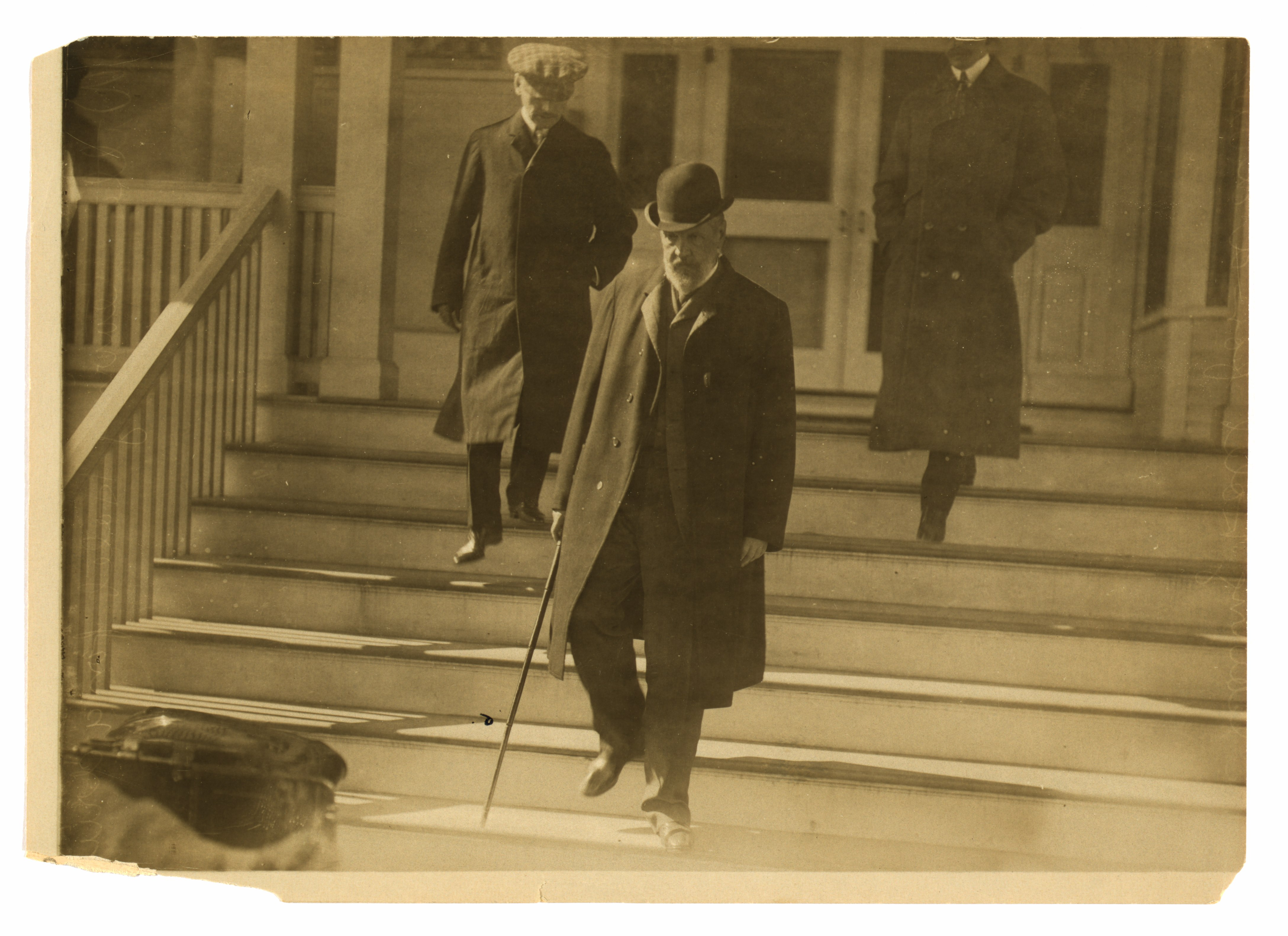
Count Witte leaving the Wentworth, 1905

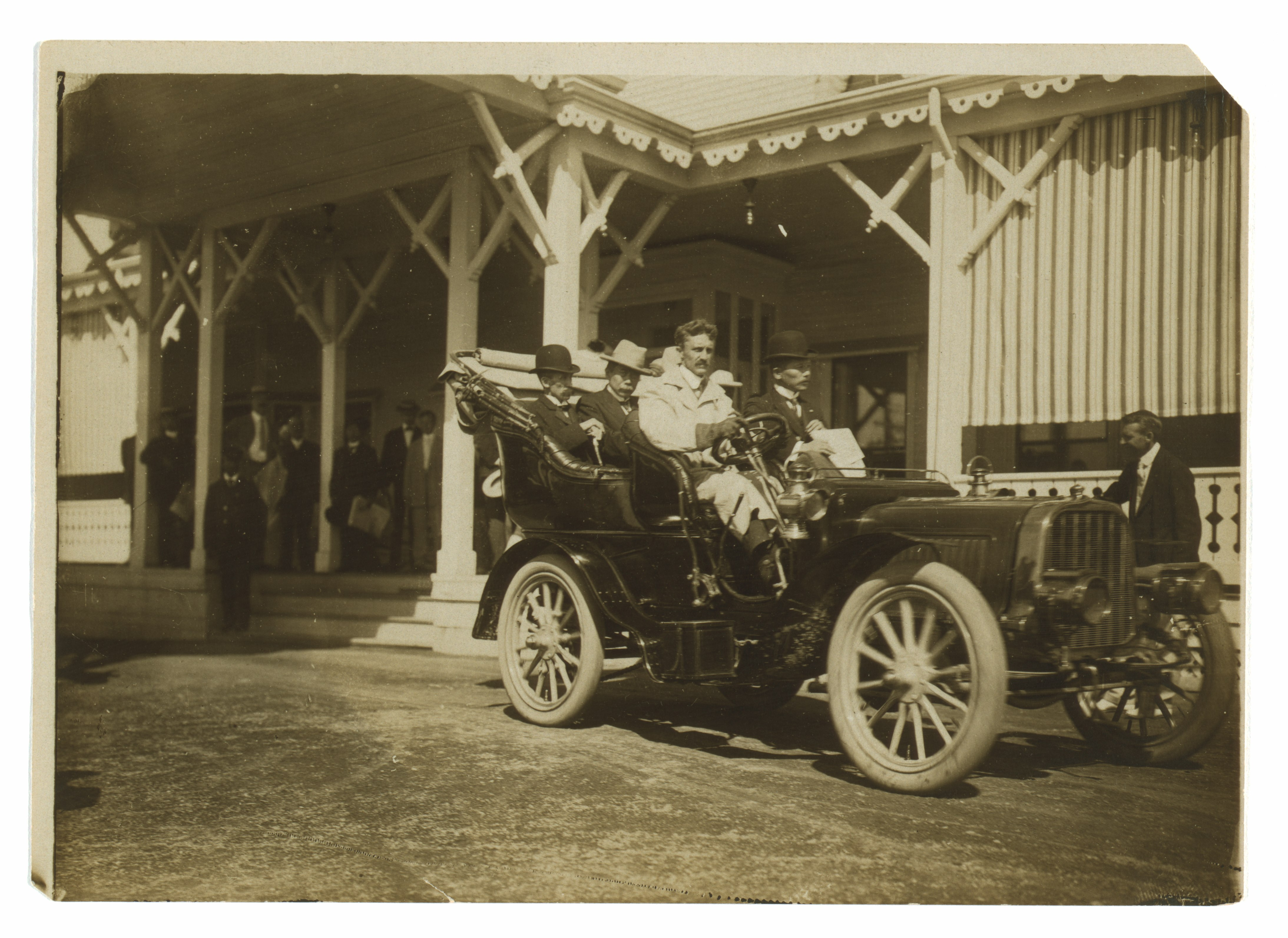
Komura Jutarō and Takahira Kogoro leaving The Wentworth for the peace conference, 1905

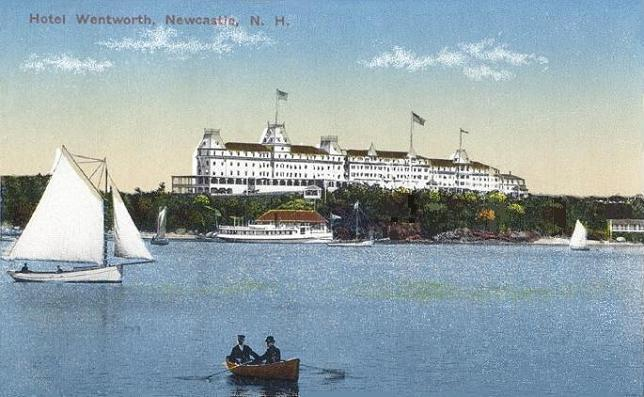
The Wentworth in 1906

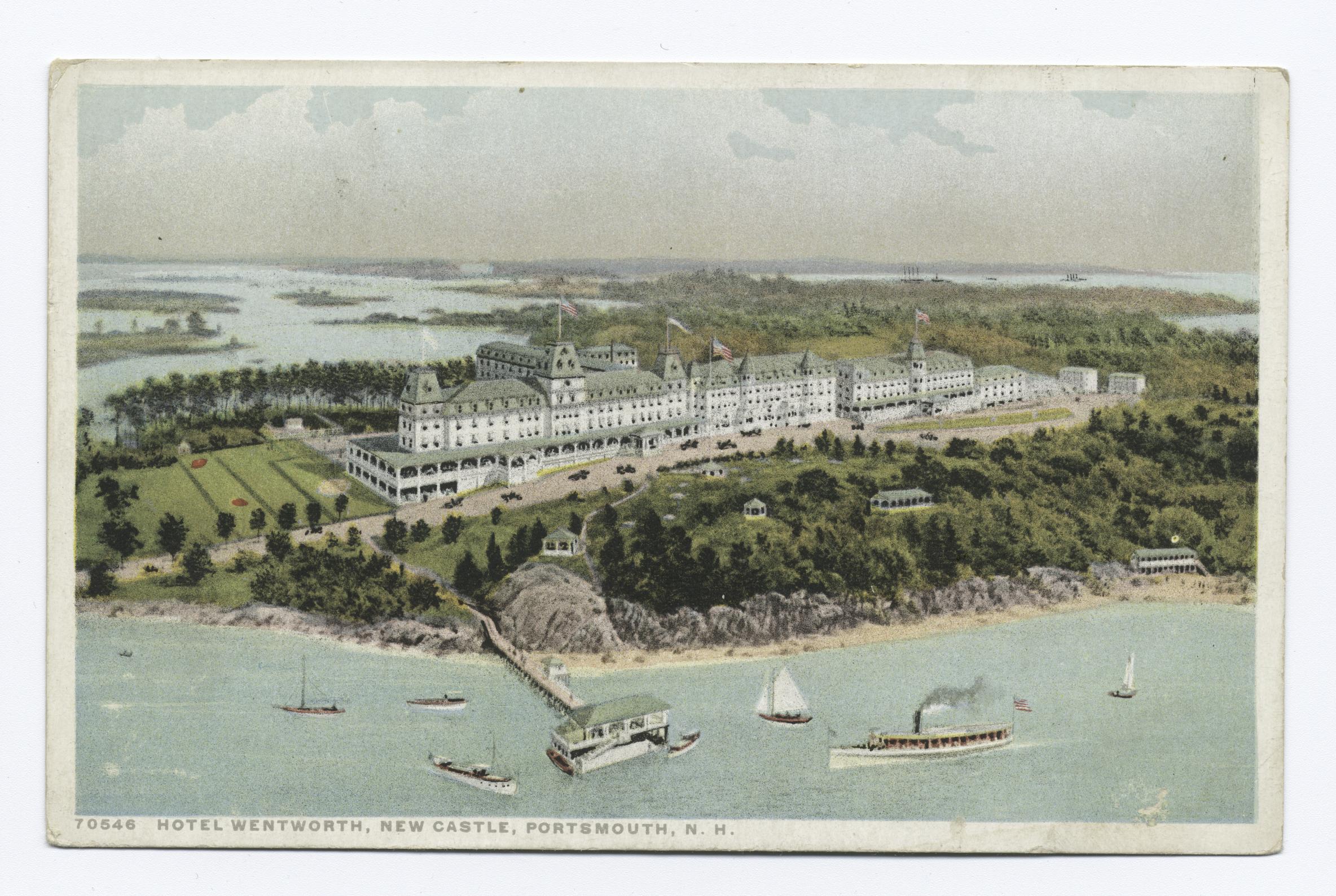
The Wentworth, after numerous additions in the early 20th century

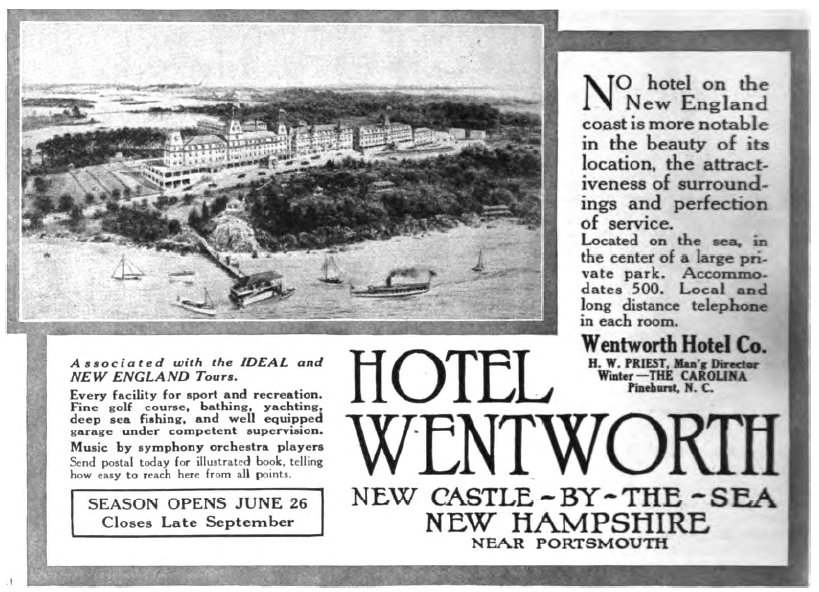
Hotel Wentworth advertisement in a 1915 issue of Scribner's Magazine

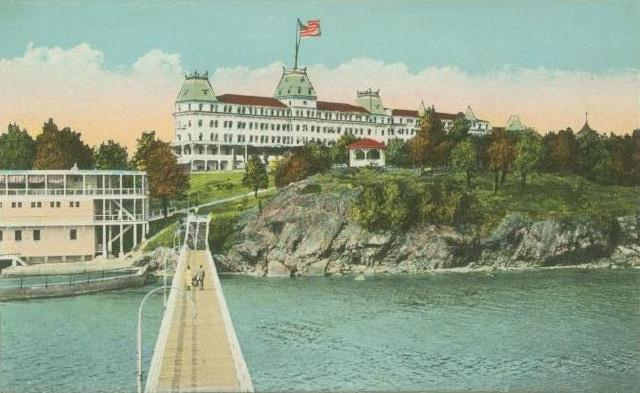
The Wentworth, circa 1920

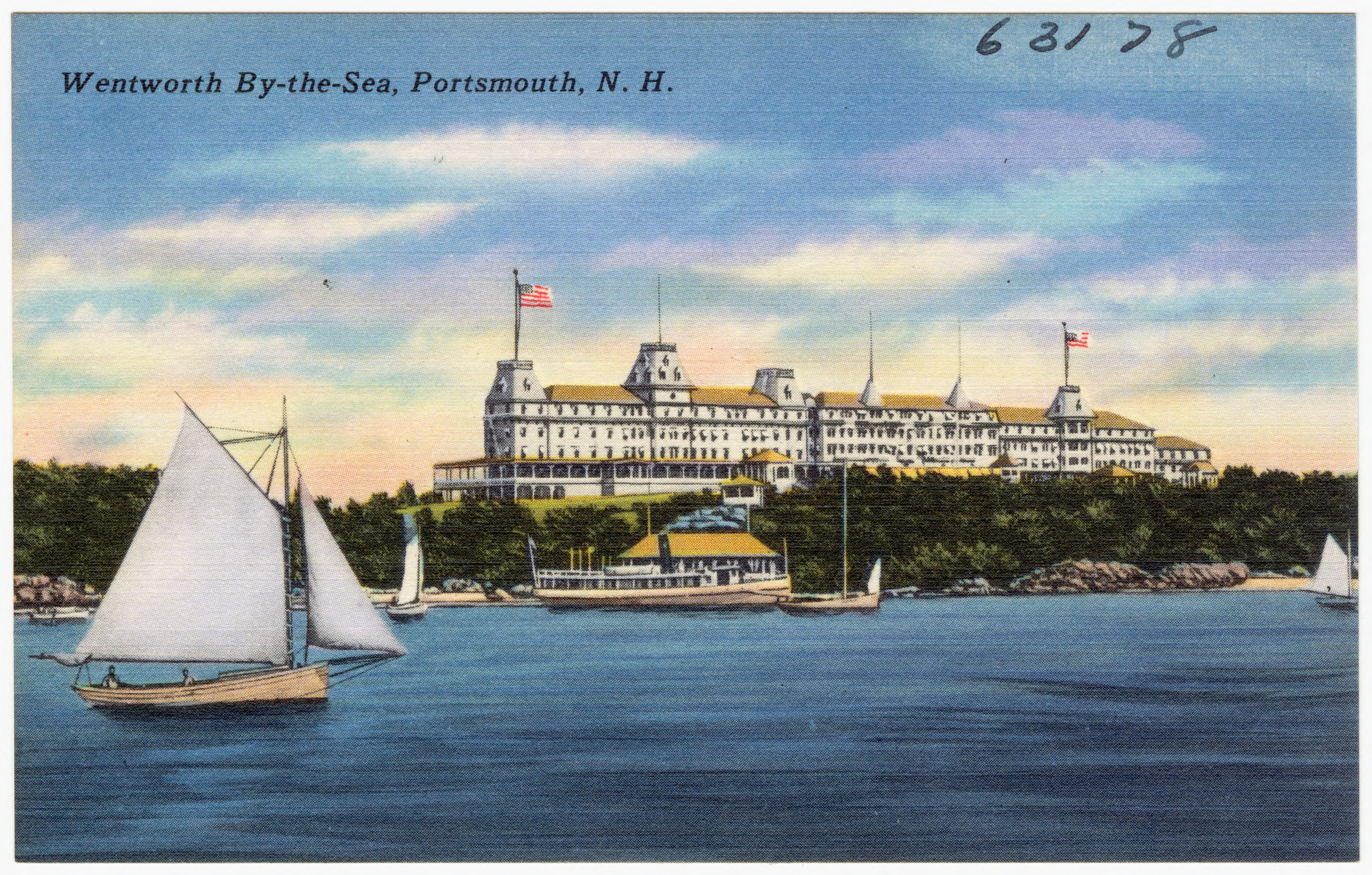
The Wentworth, 1930s

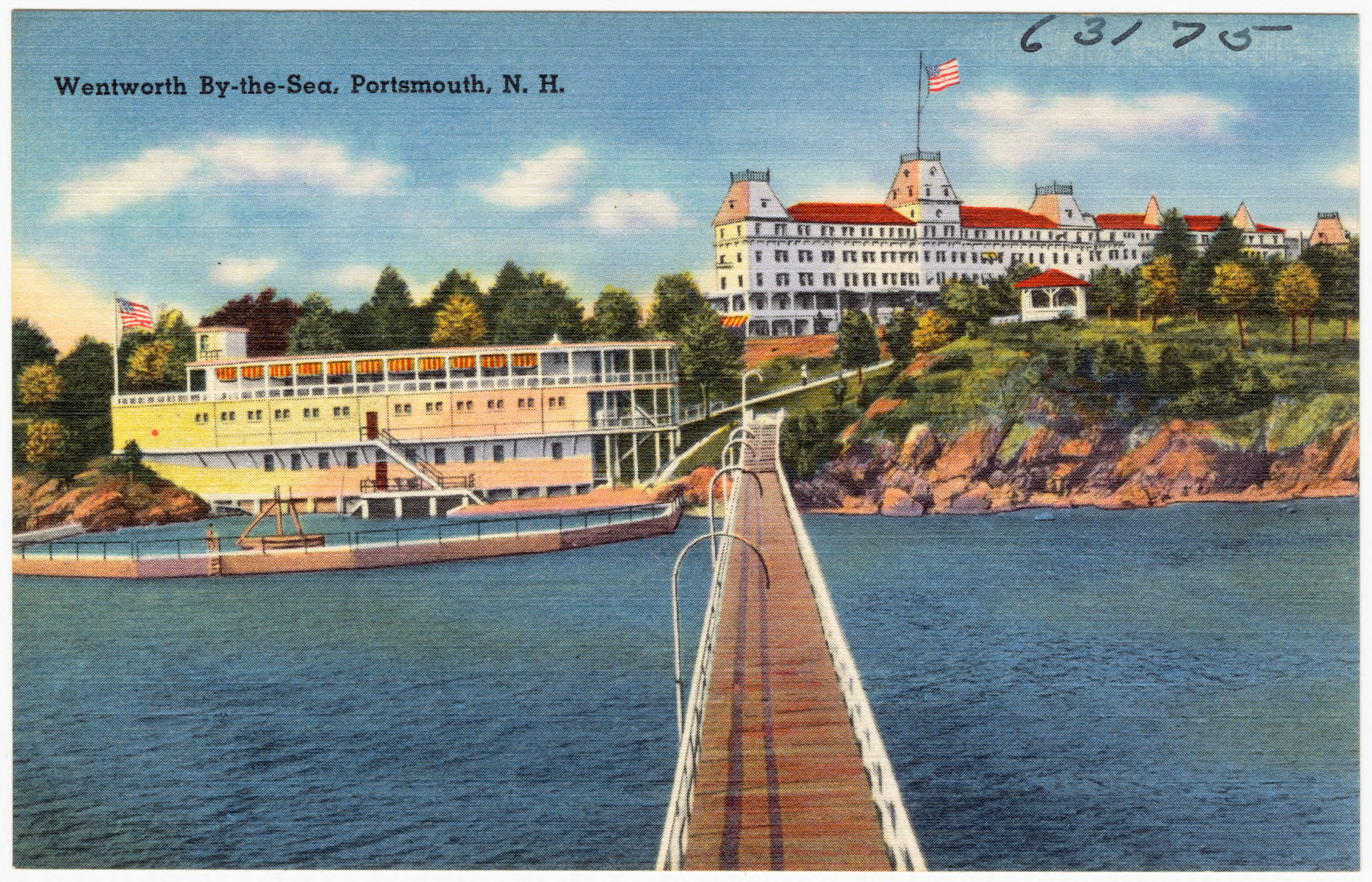
The Wentworth, 1930s

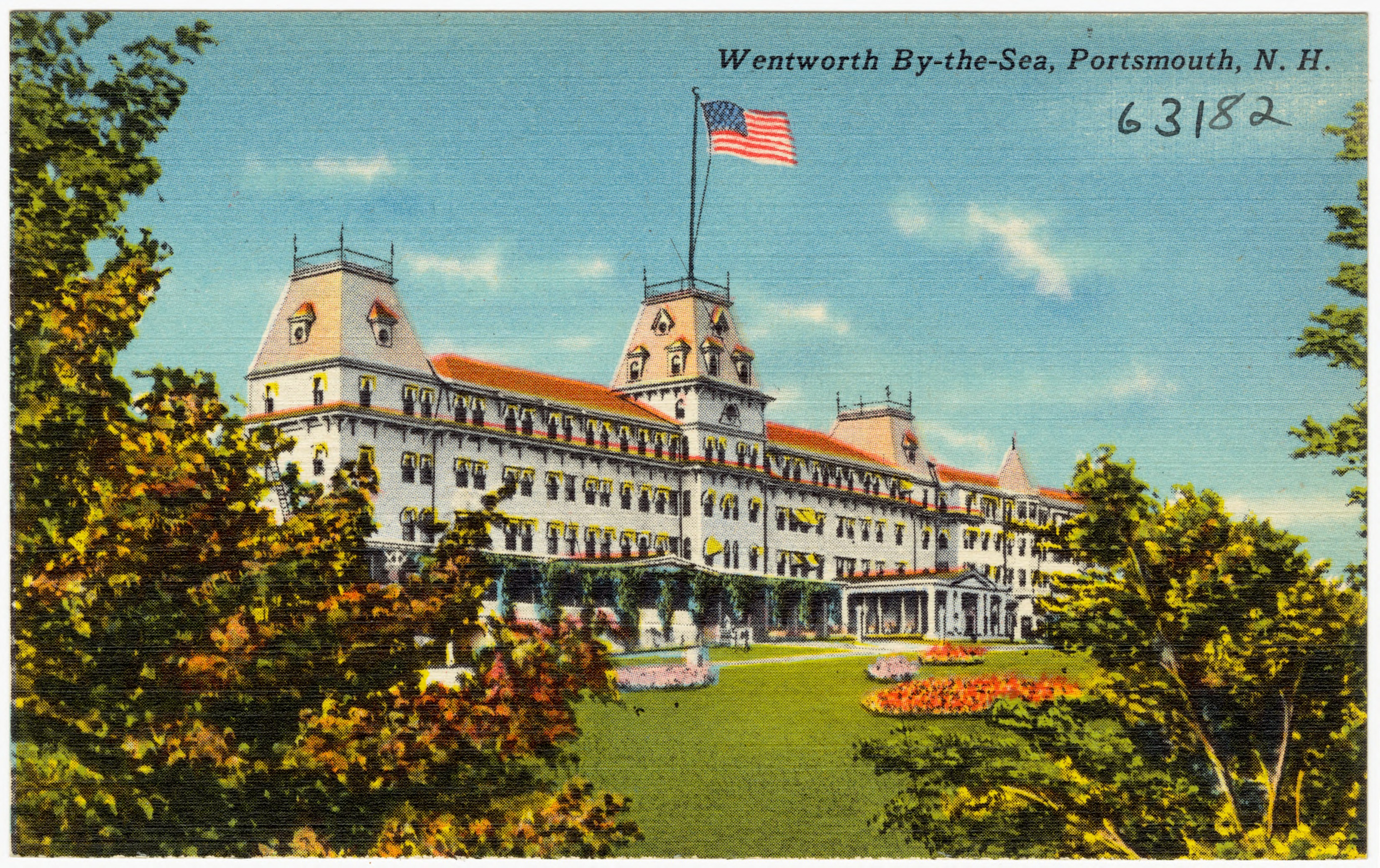
The Wentworth, 1930s

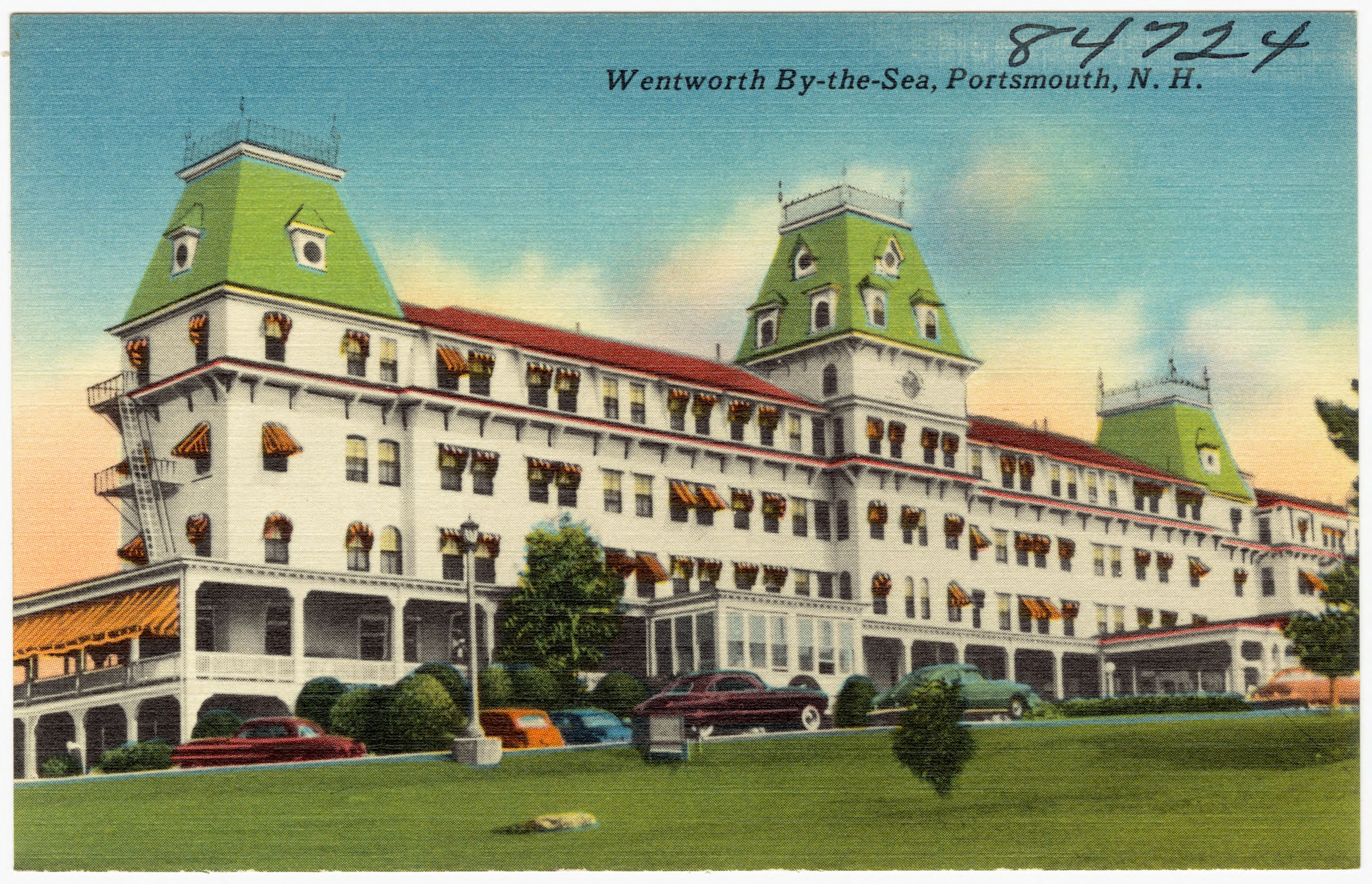
The Wentworth, 1930s

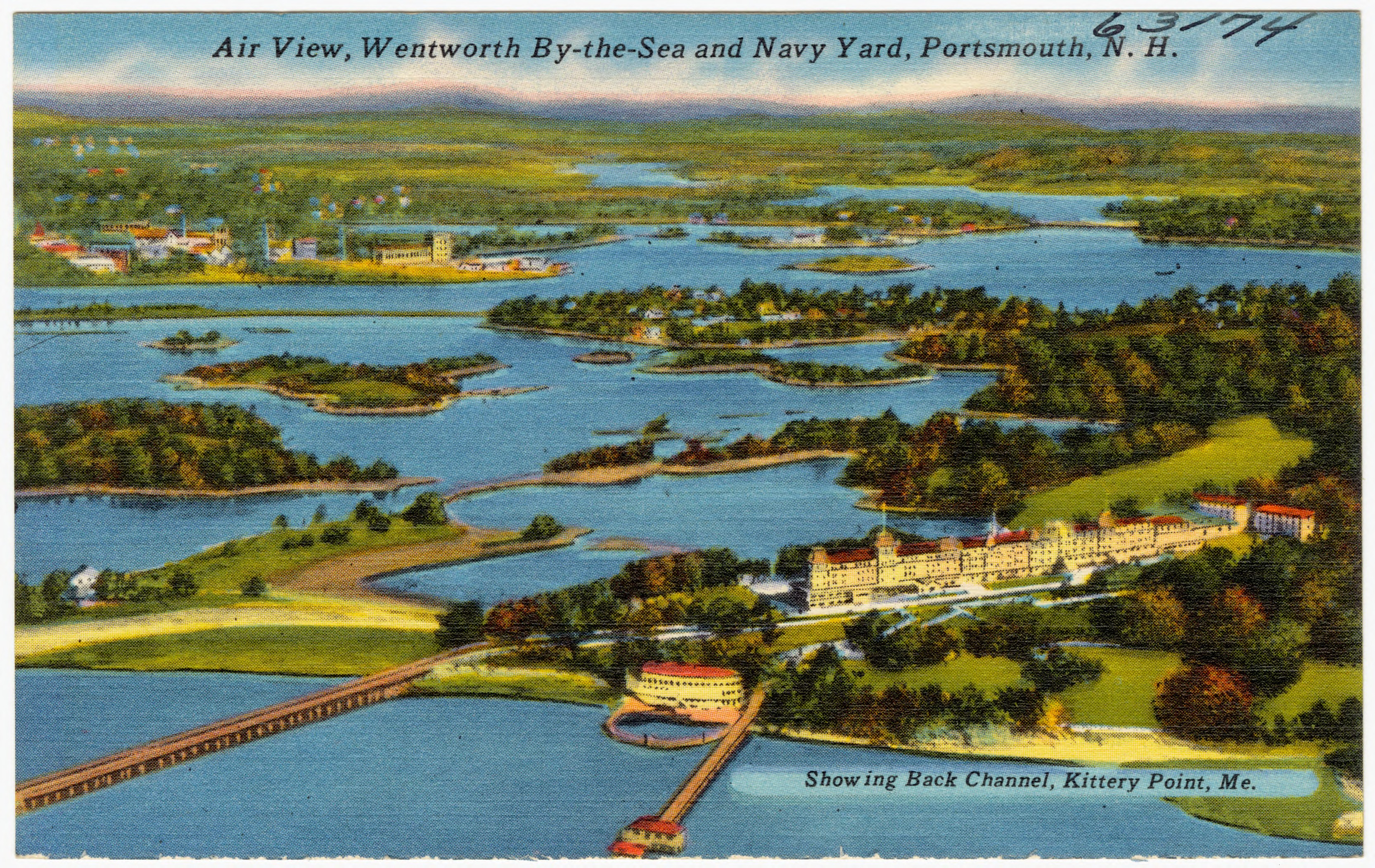
Aerial view of The Wentworth and adjacent Portsmouth Naval Shipyard, 1930s

The ruined and abandoned main wing of the Wentworth in 1995, after all the additions had been demolished

The Wentworth, 1995

The Wentworth, 1995

The Wentworth, 1995

The Wentworth, 1995

The Wentworth, 1995

The Wentworth, 1995

The Wentworth, 1995

The Wentworth, 1995

The Wentworth, 1995

The Wentworth, 1995

The Wentworth, 1995

The Wentworth, 1995

The Wentworth, 1995

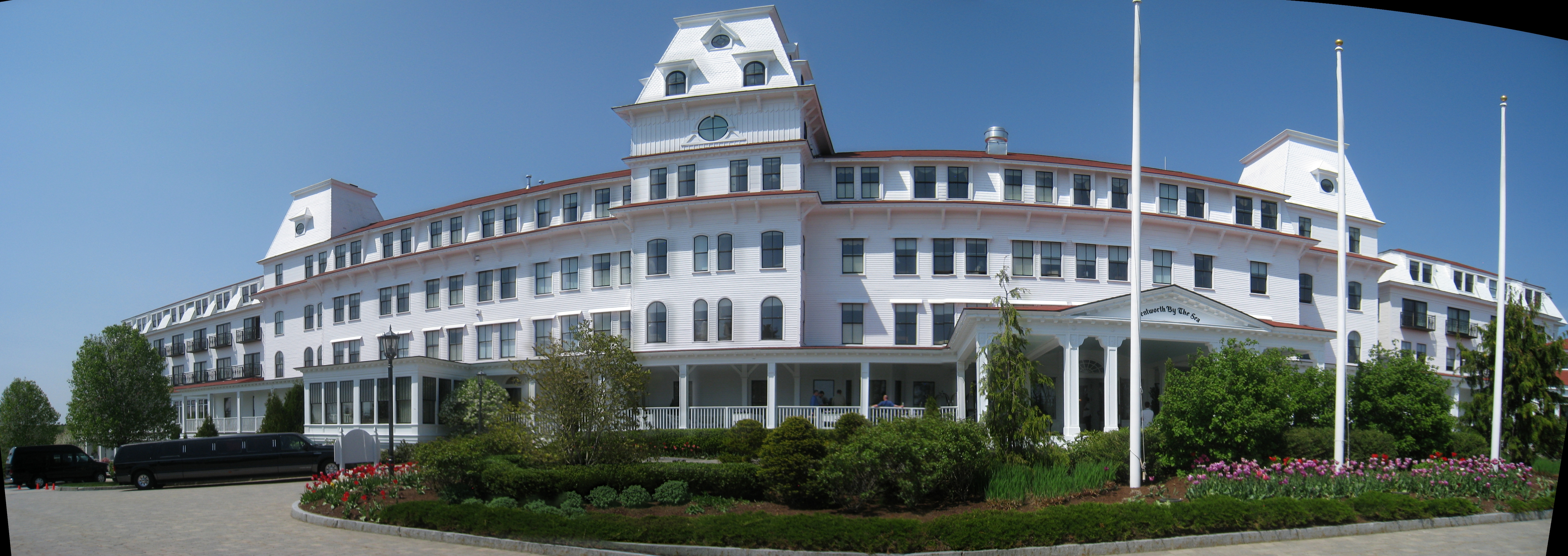
Panorama of the restored Wentworth by the Sea, 2010

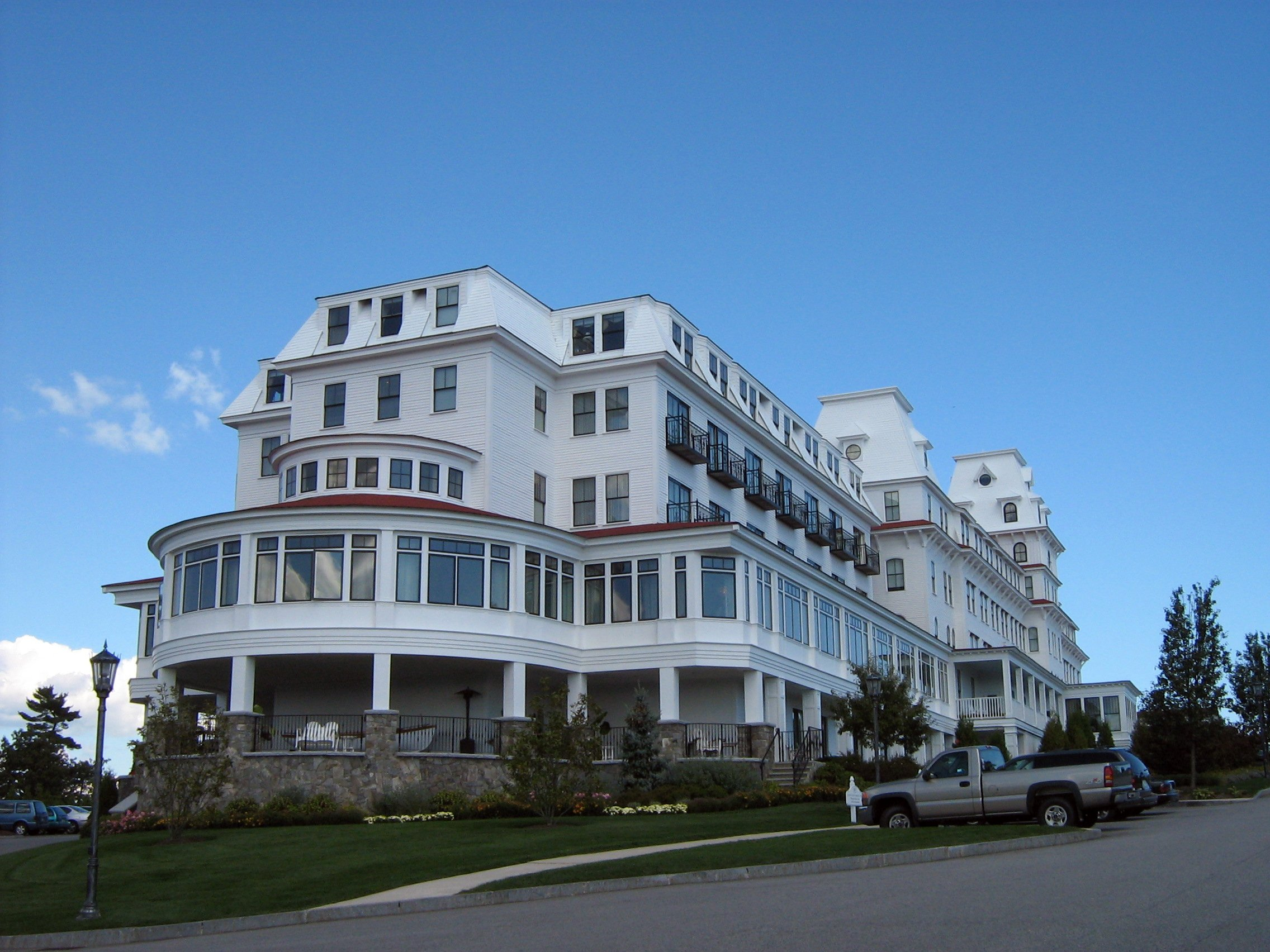
The restored Wentworth by the Sea, showing a modern addition in foreground and historic main wing in background, 2006
