= Norman Snider =

Canadian screenwriter (1945–2019)

- Born: November 14, 1945; Toronto, Ontario, Canada
- Died: January 4, 2019 (aged 73)
- Education: University of Toronto
- Occupations: Screenwriter, actor
- Years active: 1968–2019

Norman Snider (November 14, 1945 – January 4, 2019) was a Canadian screenwriter.

== Credits ==
- Partners (1976)
- Dead Ringers (1988)
- Body Parts (1991)
- Rated X (2000)
- Call Me: The Rise and Fall of Heidi Fleiss (2004)
- Casino Jack (2010)
