= Chicago Film Critics Association Awards 1988 =

Annual US film awards ceremony

The 1st Chicago Film Critics Association Awards were announced in 1989. The awards were compiled by CFCA founders Sue Kiner and Sharon LeMaire with the help of Chicago's television, radio and print film critics. There was no awards ceremony that year.

== Winners ==
The winners of the 1st Chicago Film Critics Association Awards are as follows:

=== Best Actor ===
Jeremy Irons – Dead Ringers

=== Best Actress ===
Barbara Hershey – Shy People

=== Best Director ===
Robert Zemeckis – Who Framed Roger Rabbit

=== Best Film ===
Mississippi Burning

=== Best Foreign Film ===
Au revoir les enfants

=== Best Supporting Actor ===
Martin Landau – Tucker: The Man and His Dream

=== Best Supporting Actress ===
Frances McDormand – Mississippi Burning

=== Most Promising Actor ===
Eric Bogosian – Talk Radio

=== Most Promising Actress ===
Glenne Headly – Dirty Rotten Scoundrels
