= Stewart and Cyril Marcus =

Twin American gynecologists

Stewart and Cyril Marcus (June 2, 1930 – July 1975) were identical twin gynecologists who practiced together in New York City. They died together in July 1975 at the age of 45.

== Biography ==
Stewart and Cyril Marcus were born on June 2, 1930. They grew up in Bayonne, New Jersey, where they attended Bayonne High School. While there, both ran unsuccessfully for office. Both were selected for the National Honor Society; Stewart won the B'nai B'rith essay contest and was valedictorian, while Cyril was salutatorian.

The brothers attended Syracuse University for their undergraduate degrees and medical school, then interned at Mount Sinai Hospital (Manhattan), staying on in the residency program in gynecology. The chairman of the program, Dr. Alan Frank Guttmacher, did not feel that it was wise that they continue to practice together and refused to recommend them to the same hospital. Stewart went into a program at Stanford University, while Cyril transferred to the New York University Hospital for Joint Diseases. However, Cyril found a sympathetic doctor at New York Hospital, where they both became staff gynecologists.

On July 17, 1975, the brothers were found dead in separate rooms of Cyril's Manhattan apartment at 450 East 63rd Street (other sources place the location at 1161 York Avenue). The apartment was strewn with filth that had apparently accumulated over an extended period of time. Suspected factors in the deaths included mental illness and a possible suicide pact.

It was first assumed that the brothers had died of barbiturate withdrawal, but the final report excluded this (the original toxicological report had been in error). Stewart died probably between July 10 and July 14 of a barbiturate overdose. Cyril died between July 14 (when he was last seen out of the apartment, apparently after Stewart had died) and July 17; his body showed no signs of the fatal convulsions accompanying sedative withdrawal.

The brothers' lives and the circumstances of their deaths are the subject of an article in Ron Rosenbaum's collection of essays The Secret Parts of Fortune, as well as Linda Wolfe's "The Strange Death of the Twin Gynecologists" in the September 8, 1975, issue of New York magazine. Film director David Cronenberg drew on elements from the biography of the Marcus brothers for his 1988 movie Dead Ringers, in particular their decline and their deaths.
