= 1880 New Hampshire gubernatorial election =

- November 2, 1880
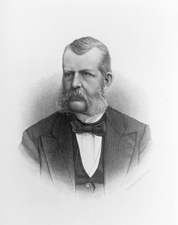

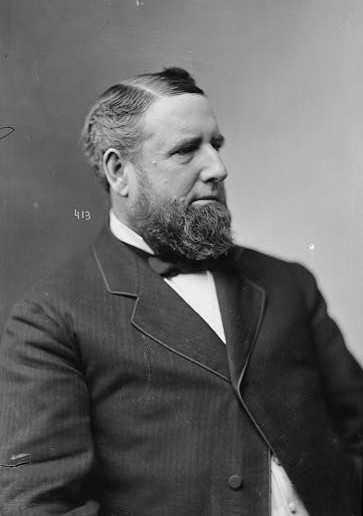
Nominee	Charles H. Bell	Frank Jones
Party	Republican	Democratic
Popular vote	44,434	40,815
Percentage	51.57%	47.37%
- County results Bell: 50–60% Jones: 50–60%
Governor before election
Nathaniel Head
Republican
Elected Governor
Charles H. Bell
Republican

The 1880 New Hampshire gubernatorial election was held on November 2, 1880. Republican nominee Charles H. Bell defeated Democratic nominee Frank Jones with 51.57% of the vote.

== General election ==
=== Candidates ===
Major party candidates

- Charles H. Bell, Republican
- Frank Jones, Democratic

Other candidates

- Warren G. Brown, Greenback
- George D. Dodge, Prohibition

=== Results ===
1880 New Hampshire gubernatorial election
Party	Candidate	Votes	%	±%
Republican	Charles H. Bell	44,434	51.57%	
Democratic	Frank Jones	40,815	47.37%	
Greenback	Warren G. Brown	503	0.58%	
Prohibition	George D. Dodge	341	0.40%	
Majority		3,619		
Turnout				
Republican hold		Swing		
