= Dead Ringers (film) =

1988 film by David Cronenberg

- Theatrical release poster
- Directed by: David Cronenberg
- Written by: David Cronenberg; Norman Snider
- Based on: Twins; 1977 novel by Bari Wood; Jack Geasland
- Produced by: Marc Boyman; David Cronenberg
- Starring: Jeremy Irons; Geneviève Bujold
- Cinematography: Peter Suschitzky
- Edited by: Ronald Sanders
- Music by: Howard Shore
- Production companies: Morgan Creek Productions; Telefilm Canada; Mantle Clinic II
- Distributed by: Astral Films (Canada); 20th Century Fox (United States)
- Release dates: September 8, 1988 (TIFF); September 23, 1988 (United States)
- Running time: 115 minutes
- Countries: Canada; United States
- Language: English
- Budget: $13 million
- Box office: $14 million

Dead Ringers is a 1988 psychological thriller film starring Jeremy Irons in a dual role as identical twin gynecologists. David Cronenberg directed and co-wrote the screenplay with Norman Snider. Their script was based on the lives of Stewart and Cyril Marcus and on the novel Twins by Bari Wood and Jack Geasland, a "highly fictionalized" version of the Marcuses' story.

The film won numerous honors, including for Irons' performance, and 10 Genie Awards, notably Best Motion Picture. Toronto International Film Festival critics have ranked it among the Top 10 Canadian Films of All Time in 2004 and 2015.

== Plot ==
Identical twins Elliot and Beverly Mantle are gynecologists, who jointly operate a highly successful clinical practice in Toronto that specializes in treating fertility problems. Elliot, the more confident and cynical of the two, seduces women who come to the clinic. When he gets tired of them, the women are passed on to the shy and passive Beverly, while the women remain unaware of the substitution.

Actress Claire Niveau comes to the clinic for her infertility, where she is found to have a "trifurcated cervix", meaning she will probably be unable to have children. Elliot seduces Claire and then urges Beverly to have sex with her. Beverly becomes emotionally attached to Claire, upsetting the equilibrium between the twins. Beverly also begins sharing Claire's abuse of prescription drugs, which he abets through his doctor's authority. When Claire learns that Elliot has been taking sexual advantage of her by impersonating Beverly, she angrily confronts them both in a restaurant, but later decides to continue a relationship with Beverly exclusively.

Eventually, Claire leaves town to work on another film, sending Beverly into clinical depression, more prescription drug abuse, and paranoid delusions about "mutant women" with abnormal genitalia. Beverly seeks out metallurgical artist Anders Wolleck and commissions a set of bizarre "gynecological instruments" for operating on these mutant women. Beverly prepares to operate on a patient during surgery with one of Wolleck's tools, while his shocked surgical team exchanges horrified glances. However, Beverly's drug-induced instability causes an injury with one of the tools; a nurse cries out that the patient is bleeding, and the surgical team immediately restrains him. Beverly collapses onto the patient, further exacerbating the scene by inhaling from her gas mask. Both brothers are immediately suspended from practice and put on administrative leave by the hospital board.

With their medical careers now ruined, Elliot locks Beverly inside the clinic and tries to clean him up, taking pills himself to "synchronize" with Beverly. When Claire returns, Beverly leaves the clinic to be with her. After recovering his sobriety, he returns to the clinic, which he finds in shambles and Elliot despondent and intoxicated. Their positions have become reversed, as Beverly cares for Elliot. Drugged and despairing, they celebrate their mock birthday, and Elliot volunteers to be killed so as to "separate the Siamese twins" and allow Beverly to live his own life. Beverly disembowels Elliot on an examination table with the same claw-like instrument of Wolleck's that he planned to use on his patient in the operating room.

The next morning, Beverly awakens to find that he killed Elliot during their drug-induced delirium. Devastated, he pulls himself together, leaves the clinic, and calls Claire on a pay phone. When she asks, "Who is this?", Beverly silently leaves the phone, walks back into the clinic, and dies in Elliot's dead arms.

== Cast ==
- Jeremy Irons as Beverly and Elliot Mantle
  - Jonathan and Nicholas Haley as Young Beverly and Elliot Mantle
- Geneviève Bujold as Claire Niveau
- Heidi von Palleske as Cary
- Barbara Gordon as Danuta
- Shirley Douglas as Laura
- Stephen Lack as Anders Wolleck
- Nick Nichols as Leo
- Lynne Cormack as Arlene
- Damir Andrei as Birchall
- Miriam Newhouse as Mrs. Bookman
- Jacqueline Hennessy as Coral
- Jillian Hennessy as Mimsy
- Denis Akiyama as Pharmacist
- Joe Matheson as Sean

== Production ==
=== Development ===
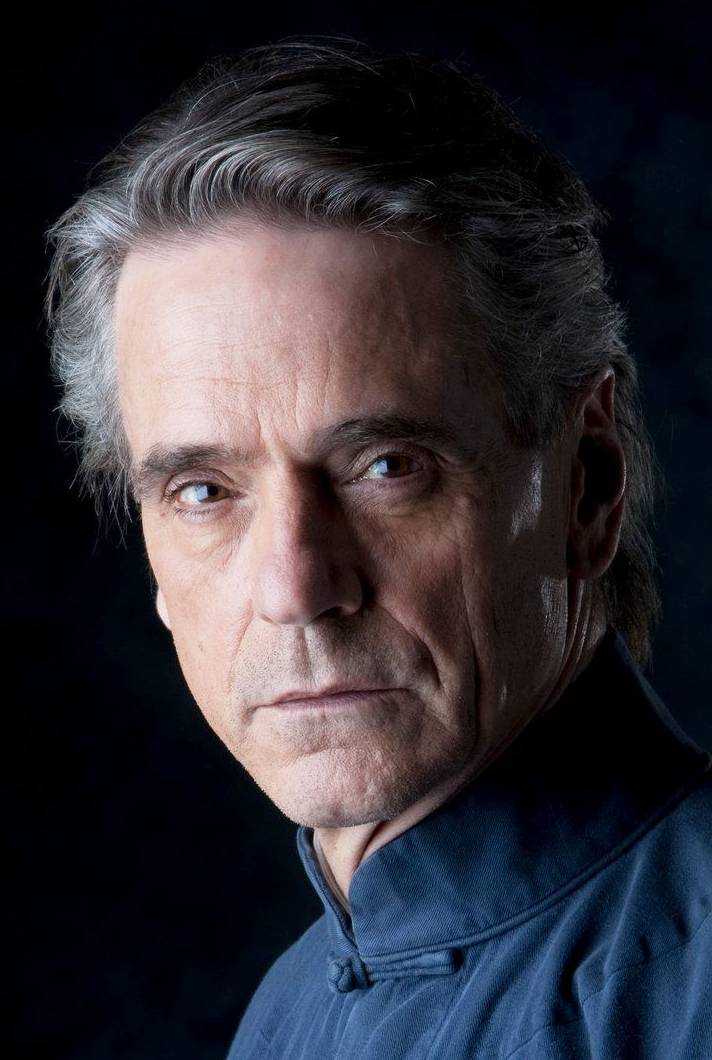
Jeremy Irons played the two roles of Beverly and Elliot Mantle.

David Cronenberg proposed the idea of making a film about twins to Carol Baum at Lorimar in 1981. Baum told Cronenberg about Stewart and Cyril Marcus and sent articles written about the brothers and a book, Twins by Bari Wood and Jack Geasland, to him. Cronenberg found an article in Esquire about the brothers titled Dead Ringers.

Baum and Joe Roth got Sylvio Tabet, a Lebanese producer, to finance the film. Cronenberg hired Norman Snider, who wrote Secret Weapons, one of Cronenberg's television films. Tabet wanted to begin filming with Snider's first draft. Cronenberg rejected it and did another draft, but Sylvio disliked it and instead wanted to film the first draft. Cronenberg later stated that Tabet refused to pay him the $7,500 he was owed for working on the script. Tabet's investment into the film ended in 1982.

Bob Bookman at ABC Motion Pictures was interested in the film, but Snider, Baum, Roth, and the source material were dropped to avoid complications. Cronenberg chose Andy Lewis, the writer of Klute, to write the script. Cronenberg criticized Lewis' approach to the film, as Lewis wanted "to demystify them, and not let them be amazing or strange", not "impose any kind of mythology on twins", and wanted "all twins to be normal people who just happened to be twins". Bookman was replaced by Stu Samuels, who was not interested in the film, and ABC Motion Pictures later dissolved.

Cronenberg wrote his own draft of the film based on Snider's in 1982, and he stated that 60% of the script was his and 40% was Snider's. Cronenberg previously worked with Dino De Laurentiis's backing on The Dead Zone and an unsuccessful adaption of Total Recall. Cronenberg proposed Dead Ringers with Raffaella de Laurentiis as producer after leaving Total Recall. However, Raffaella told Cronenberg that they could not fund the film due to their company's past financial failures, including Million Dollar Mystery. She stated that "I hope this isn't another Platoon" as the De Laurentiis gave up the critically and financially successful film during its production.

De Laurentiis considered making the film if the budget could be kept under $10 million, but by the time production was ended, sets worth $300,000 had been constructed in leased buildings, and Jeremy Irons had agreed to do the film. It "would have cost another $30,000 just to get rid of them" according to Cronenberg, who then rented out the buildings they leased to other productions until another financial backer could be found. Roth and Jim Robinson formed Morgan Creek Entertainment, which gave financial backing to the film.

=== Casting ===
In his DVD commentary, Irons claims that Robert De Niro declined playing the Mantles due to his unease with the subject matter and portraying gynecologists, while William Hurt decided to reject the parts because "it is hard enough to play one role". The film marked the screen debut of actress Jill Hennessy and her twin sister Jacqueline, who play call girls in a scene.

Irons was given two different dressing rooms with two sets of costumes for playing his two characters. However, given the fact that he said, "the whole point of the story is you should sometimes be confused as to which is which", he chose to use only one of the rooms and combine different costume items intended for different characters. Irons also developed an "internal way" to portray each character, employing the Alexander technique for "different energy points", giving each character his own appearance.

=== Filming ===
Mark Irwin was meant to perform the cinematography for the film, but during the production delay, he took a job in the United States and was replaced by Peter Suschitzky. The film's title was changed from Twins due to a paid request from Ivan Reitman to avoid confusion with his film Twins.

Director Peter Greenaway claims that Cronenberg queried him about his film A Zed & Two Noughts for two hours before going on to make Dead Ringers eight months later.

An additional dream sequence in which an aged version of one brother grows out of the abdomen of the other was cut by Cronenberg. He showed test audiences versions without the dream sequences, with one sequence, and with both sequences.

== Reception ==
On review aggregator Rotten Tomatoes, the film has an approval rating of 86% based on 49 reviews, and an average rating of 7.70/10. The website's critical consensus reads, "Dead Ringers serves up a double dose of Jeremy Irons in service of a devilishly unsettling concept and commandingly creepy work from director David Cronenberg." According to the review aggregator Metacritic, the film received a weighted score of 86 out of 100, indicating "universal acclaim". Audiences polled by CinemaScore gave the film an average grade of "C−" on an A+ to F scale.

Roger Ebert gave the film two and a half stars, writing, "it's like a collaboration between med school and a supermarket tabloid", and said it was challenging but interesting for his female friends to view. Ebert also credited Irons for making each twin unique. Variety said Irons portrayed his characters with skill. In The Washington Post, Desson Howe assessed it as "unnerving but also enthralling". For the same paper, Rita Kempley called it "every woman's nightmare turned into a creepy thriller", adding it was "like slowing down to look at a traffic accident, afraid you might see something. It's really sordid stuff that becomes ridiculous, painful, unbelievable and tedious".

It is the favorite Cronenberg film of Korean director Park Chan-wook and was voted for in the 2002 Sight & Sound poll by Lalitha Gopalan. Filmmaker John Carpenter selected it as the tenth best film in his Criterion Collection list.

In 1999, Rolling Stone listed Dead Ringers as 95th on its list of "100 Maverick Movies". Total Film placed Dead Ringers 35th on its list of the "50 Greatest Horror Movies of All Time" while Entertainment Weekly placed it 20th on their list of "The 25 scariest movies of all time". It was named one of "The Top 10 'True-Story' Horror Movies of All-time!" by Bloody Disgusting.

In 1993, the Toronto International Film Festival Group compiled a Top 10 Canadian Films of All Time list, with festival director Piers Handling writing a lack of Cronenberg films was significant, and that Dead Ringers and Videodrome divided voters, causing neither to win a place on the list. Dead Ringers afterwards ranked sixth in the 2004 update, and seventh in 2015.

=== Box office ===
The film grossed $8 million in the United States and Canada. Internationally, it grossed $6 million for a worldwide total of $14 million.

=== Accolades ===
Irons won critics groups' Best Actor awards for Dead Ringers, and when he won the Academy Award for Best Actor in 1991 for Reversal of Fortune, he thanked Cronenberg in his acceptance speech.

| Award | Date of ceremony | Category | Recipient(s) | Result | Ref(s) |
|---|---|---|---|---|---|
| Chicago Film Critics Association | 1989 | Best Actor | Jeremy Irons | Won | |
| Genie Awards | 22 March 1989 | Best Motion Picture | David Cronenberg and Marc Boyman | Won | |
| Genie Awards | 22 March 1989 | Best Direction | David Cronenberg | Won | |
| Genie Awards | 22 March 1989 | Best Adapted Screenplay | David Cronenberg and Norman Snider | Won | |
| Genie Awards | 22 March 1989 | Best Actor | Jeremy Irons | Won | |
| Genie Awards | 22 March 1989 | Best Actress | Geneviève Bujold | Nominated | |
| Genie Awards | 22 March 1989 | Best Editing | Ronald Sanders | Won | |
| Genie Awards | 22 March 1989 | Best Art Direction | Carol Spier | Won | |
| Genie Awards | 22 March 1989 | Best Cinematography | Peter Suschitzky | Won | |
| Genie Awards | 22 March 1989 | Best Costume Design | Denise Cronenberg | Nominated | |
| Genie Awards | 22 March 1989 | Best Score | Howard Shore | Won | |
| Genie Awards | 22 March 1989 | Best Sound | Bryan Day, Andy Nelson and Don White | Won | |
| Genie Awards | 22 March 1989 | Best Sound Editing | Terry Burke, Richard Cadger, Wayne Griffin, David Evans and David Giammarco | Won | |
| Los Angeles Film Critics Association | 24 January 1989 | Best Director | David Cronenberg | Won | |
| Los Angeles Film Critics Association | 24 January 1989 | Best Supporting Actress | Geneviève Bujold | Won | |
| National Society of Film Critics | 9 January 1989 | Best Screenplay | David Cronenberg | 2nd Place | |
| New York Film Critics Circle | 15 January 1989 | Best Film | David Cronenberg | 3rd Place | |
| New York Film Critics Circle | 15 January 1989 | Best Actor | Jeremy Irons | Won | |

== Television adaptation ==
In 2005, it was announced that HBO would make a television series based on Dead Ringers with Cronenberg writing. Wesley Strick proposed the idea to Cronenberg, but the series was never made.

On August 18, 2020, Amazon Prime Video placed a straight-to-series order for a television adaptation of Dead Ringers, with Rachel Weisz set to star. On July 22, 2021, Michael Chernus joined the starring cast. On August 2, 2021, Poppy Liu was cast in a main role. The miniseries premiered on April 21, 2023, consisting of six episodes.

== See also ==
- Look-alike
