= Mighty Ducks (disambiguation) =

The Mighty Ducks is an American media franchise.

Mighty Ducks or The Mighty Ducks may also refer to:

== Film and television ==
- The Mighty Ducks (film), a 1992 American ice hockey comedy-drama film, the first in The Mighty Ducks franchise
  - D2: The Mighty Ducks, the 1994 sequel
  - D3: The Mighty Ducks, the 1996 sequel
- Mighty Ducks: The Animated Series, a 1996 Disney animated TV series, loosely based on the film
- The Mighty Ducks: Game Changers, a 2021 live-action TV series based on the film

== Sports ==
- Anaheim Ducks, formerly the Mighty Ducks of Anaheim, an American ice hockey team
- Cincinnati Mighty Ducks, an American ice hockey team

== See also ==
- Mighty Goose
