= The Mighty Ducks: Game Changers =

2021 American sports television series

- Genre: Sports comedy-drama
- Based on: The Mighty Ducks by Steve Brill
- Developed by: Steve Brill; Josh Goldsmith; Cathy Yuspa
- Starring: Lauren Graham; Brady Noon; Maxwell Simkins; Swayam Bhatia; Julee Cerda; Luke Islam; Bella Higginbotham; Taegen Burns; Kiefer O'Reilly; De'Jon Watts; Emilio Estevez; Naveen Paddock; Josh Duhamel
- Music by: John Debney
- Country of origin: United States
- Original language: English
- No. of seasons: 2
- No. of episodes: 20

Production
- Executive producers: Josh Goldsmith; Cathy Yuspa; Steve Brill; James Griffiths; Michael Spiller; Emilio Estevez; Brad Petrigala; George Heller; Jordan Kerner; Jon Avnet; Lauren Graham
- Producers: Arielle Boisvert; Shawn Williamson; Damir Konjicija; Dario Konjicija; Marissa Berlin; Todd Linden; Jessica Watson; Patrick Kang; Michael Levin; Buddy Enright
- Production locations: Vancouver, British Columbia, Canada
- Cinematography: Séamus Tierney; Edward J. Pei
- Editors: Steven Sprung; Eric Lea; Brent White; Hallie Faben Comfort; Gena Fridman; Justin Chinn; Annie Popko
- Running time: 30–42 minutes
- Production companies: Goldsmith Yuspa Productions; Brillco; Brillstein Entertainment Partners; ABC Signature

Original release
- Network: Disney+
- Release: March 26, 2021 – November 30, 2022

Related
- D3: The Mighty Ducks; Mighty Ducks: The Animated Series

The Mighty Ducks: Game Changers is an American sports comedy-drama television series based on the 1992 film written by Steve Brill. Developed by Brill, Josh Goldsmith, and Cathy Yuspa for Disney+, the series serves as a follow-up to the film, and is produced by ABC Signature and Brillstein Entertainment, with Brill serving as head writer, and Goldsmith and Yuspa serving as showrunners.

Lauren Graham, Brady Noon, and Emilio Estevez star in the series. As of January 2018, ABC began developing a series based on the franchise The Mighty Ducks, with Brill set to write the series. The series was announced to be released on Disney+ in November 2018. Filming for the series was scheduled to begin in February 2020, and ended in June 2020. In August 2020, it was announced that filming could officially begin after Disney TV Studios made a deal with British Columbia unions about testing the cast and crew members for the ongoing COVID-19 pandemic. The series premiered on March 26, 2021. In August 2021, the series was renewed for a second season. which premiered on September 28, 2022. In February 2023, the series was cancelled by Disney after two seasons.

The series was also removed from Disney+ on May 26, 2023, amidst a Disney+ and Hulu content removal purge as part of a broader cost cutting initiative under Disney CEO Bob Iger.

== Synopsis ==
Now a hockey powerhouse, the Mighty Ducks junior team is selective about who makes the roster. After being cut from the team, 12-year-old Evan Morrow, at the urging of his mother, forms a new team of underdogs with the help of original Ducks coach Gordon Bombay, who has since become the despondent owner of a lower level ice rink.

== Cast and characters ==
=== Main ===
- Lauren Graham as Alex Morrow, mother of Evan and coach of the Don't Bothers. She formed the Don't Bothers after Evan is cut by the Mighty Ducks. Alex didn't know anything about hockey when she started coaching, but has since helped the team grow in confidence by putting fun first. She was briefly fired as coach after becoming too obsessed with winning, but later returned in time for States. She works as a paralegal for Ducksworth, Saver & Gross Law Firm, the same law firm Gordon Bombay worked for before he was arrested for DUI and sentenced to community service .
- Brady Noon as Evan Morrow, Alex's son who is cut by the Ducks for being too slow and told he is wasting his time pursuing hockey. He is the Don't Bothers' captain until he steps aside to regain the trust of his team after almost leaving to rejoin the Ducks. Evan scores the first goal in team history against his old team.
- Maxwell Simkins as Nick Ganz, Evan's best friend who helps start the Don't Bothers. He lives with his two moms next door to the Morrows. He is also friends with Winnie, the cocoa girl at the Ice Palace. Nick co-hosted The Wraparound podcast with Mary Joe prior to joining the team.
- Swayam Bhatia as Sofi Hanson-Bhatt, Evan's friend and later girlfriend who is a talented hockey player with an accurate shot. She leaves the Ducks to join the Don't Bothers despite her perfectionist parents opposing the move.
- Julee Cerda as Stephanie (season 1), Alex's snobby boss at DS&G who frequently takes advantage of Alex's soft nature. Her softer side comes out when it is revealed she and husband, Clark, are getting divorced. Her twins, Trevor and Ruby, play for the Ducks.
- Luke Islam as Koob, the Don't Bothers' goalie with great reflexes. He was a hardcore gamer before joining the team.
- Bella Higginbotham as Lauren (season 1), a member of the Don't Bothers who is into cosplay. She is seen to be the team's enforcer, having learned a few moves from former Duck Connie Moreau.
- Taegen Burns as Maya, a member of the Don't Bothers from New York and part of the popular girls clique at school. She is Lauren's best friend.
- Kiefer O'Reilly as Logan (season 1), a member of the Don't Bothers who moved to Minnesota from Toronto after his parents divorced. He lives with his father in the same street as Evan and Nick. Despite having a lot of pro hockey equipment, including a Toronto Maple Leafs jersey, Logan had trouble skating until Bombay helps him overcome this and discovers he has a talent for stick-handling. He is the last of the Don't Bothers to score a goal.
- De'Jon Watts as Sam, a member of the Don't Bothers who never turns down a dare, such as Evan daring him to join the team
- Emilio Estevez as Gordon Bombay (season 1), the original Ducks coach and owner of the Ice Palace. He was found to be in a dark place when the Don't Bothers start playing at the rink and reignites his love for the game. He later becomes assistant coach of the Don't Bothers and briefly coach when Alex is fired before being reinstated.
- Naveen Paddock as Jace Cole (season 2)
- Josh Duhamel as Colin Cole (season 2), a former NHL player who runs an intense hockey training camp called the Elite Performance Ice Center that the Ducks signed up for the summer and Jace's father

=== Recurring ===
- Dylan Playfair as Coach T, the condescending head coach of the Mighty Ducks who cuts Evan from the team, before trying, albeit unsuccessfully, to bring him back. He regularly taunts the Don't Bothers and refers to them as a "bunch of clowns".
- Em Haine as Winnie Berigan, an employee at the Ice Palace. She is friends with Nick and is often seen talking to Alex. She is also known for having many boyfriends.
- Lia Frankland as Mary Joe, host of The Wraparound podcast and Nick's former co-host. Her father, Terry, takes over from Nick when he joins the Don't Bothers.
- Amy Goodmurphy as Paula Ganz, Nick's mother
- Jane Stanton as Sherri Andrews, Nick's other mom
- Stephnie Weir as Marni (season 2), Coach Cole's administrative assistant at the Elite Performance Ice Center
- Connor DeWolfe as A.J. Lawrence (season 2)
- Timm Sharp as Coach Toby (season 2)
- Tiffany Denise Hobbs as Coach Jackie (season 2)
- Rich Eisen as himself (season 2)
- Margot Anderson-Song as Gertie Willins (season 2)
- Noah Baird as Cody "Fries" Lawrence (season 2), A.J. younger brother who is under A.J.'s shadow
- Jaden Micah Wolfe as Franklin (season 2)
- Joelle Better as Rambo Tate (season 2)

=== Guest stars ===
- Matt Doherty as Lester Averman (season 1), an alumnus of the Mighty Ducks
- Elden Henson as Fulton Reed (season 1), an alumnus of the Mighty Ducks
- Garette Henson as Guy Germaine (season 1), an alumnus of the Mighty Ducks
- Vincent A. LaRusso as Adam Banks (season 1), an alumnus of the Mighty Ducks
- Marguerite Moreau as Connie Moreau (season 1), an alumna of the Mighty Ducks
- Justin Wong as Ken Wu (season 1), an alumnus of the Mighty Ducks

== Episodes ==
=== Series overview ===
| Season | Episodes | Originally released | |
| Season | Episodes | First released | Last released |
|---|---|---|---|
| 1 | 10 | March 26, 2021 | May 28, 2021 |
| 2 | 10 | September 28, 2022 | November 30, 2022 |

=== Season 1 (2021) ===
| No. overall | No. in season | Title | Directed by | Written by | Original release date |
|---|---|---|---|---|---|
| 1 | 1 | "Game On" | James Griffiths | Steve Brill & Josh Goldsmith & Cathy Yuspa | March 26, 2021 |
After her son is cut from the Mighty Ducks, struggling single mom Alex Morrow decides to help Evan start his own hockey team so he can have fun and get away from the stressful, win-at-all-costs atmosphere the Ducks promote. While Evan and his neighbor, Nick, set about recruiting players, Alex searches for a rink. After being turned down by many area rinks, Alex stumbles upon the Ice Palace, a rundown rink owned and operated by Gordon Bombay, who has reverted to his old personality of hating hockey and is barely keeping the rink afloat. He initially refuses Alex, wanting to remain distant from hockey, but is convinced when Alex offers him money from a state hockey program in exchange for renting the facilities. Evan and Nick, meanwhile, recruit a team of young misfits, many of whom don't have hockey experience. But despite the odds being stacked against them, the team announces their intent to challenge the rest of the league and Alex, whom Evan asks to be coach, names the squad the Don't Bothers.
| 2 | 2 | "Dusters" | Michael Spiller | Josh Goldsmith & Cathy Yuspa | April 2, 2021 |
The Don't Bothers meet at the Ice Palace for their first practice. Evan is excited to get to work, but he quickly becomes dismayed when Alex's coaching focuses more on sharing feelings and trust exercises. Alex and Evan each consult Bombay for advice, but he is adamant about remaining away from hockey. After Evan confronts her about the issues facing the team, such as an equipment shortage, Alex despondently hides in the bleachers, when she witnesses Bombay warm up on the ice. They talk about Alex's coaching before Bombay tips her off to a cache of unclaimed hockey equipment at the Ducks' skating complex. Despite the new gear and their determination, the Don't Bothers are heavily beaten in their first game. Evan, upset over the loss, resolves to try harder and leads the team in an after-game skate. As she watches on, Alex realizes that her methods aren't working and she'll actually need to learn more about hockey to be a more effective coach.
| 3 | 3 | "Breakaway" | Jay Karas | Josh Goldsmith & Cathy Yuspa | April 9, 2021 |
Evan relentlessly tries to get Sofi to join the Don't Bothers, but she refuses each time. Winnie, the cocoa girl at the Ice Palace, is dumped by her boyfriend and Nick tries to win her heart, but Bombay advises him to be just a friend. The Don't Bothers face the Ducks for the first time and Sofi scores a barrage of goals. However, a play Bombay wrote down in Alex's notebook helps the Don't Bothers score their first goal. Sofi decides to quit the Ducks when Coach T berates the team and points her out singlehandedly for letting Evan score. Alex confronts Bombay about his past and he explains how he went from being a college hockey coach to running the Ice Palace. Sofi tells Evan that she still needs permission from her parents to join the Don't Bothers.
| 4 | 4 | "Hockey Moms" | James Griffiths | Josh Goldsmith & Cathy Yuspa | April 16, 2021 |
Bombay tries to motivate Alex while helping her prepare to take on Stephanie, her boss, in the Slap Shot Challenge, part of the Ducks' annual "Hockey Moms Skill Challenge". An exhausted Sofi has been practicing with both the Ducks and Don't Bothers and forges her mother's signature so she can play for the team. However, it all catches up with her when she shows up at a Ducks practice accidentally wearing her Don't Bothers jersey and is confronted by her parents. During the showdown, Alex wins with a slap shot of 41 mph, only to lose on the technicality that her skate crossed the line during the shot. Sofi is disappointed as the team she would play for was dependent on who would win, but later gets a surprise from her father; a signed permission slip for her to join the Don't Bothers. Elsewhere, Nick, believing he is in the "best friend zone" with Evan, invites him to a sleepover. They also ask Koob and bond with the goalie while trying to retrieve Koob's phone from Nick's mothers.
| 5 | 5 | "Cherry Picker" | Jay Karas | Matthew Carlson | April 23, 2021 |
Alex and Bombay are growing closer, leading to Bombay inviting Alex to a pro-hockey game. Things are thrown off kilter, though, when Evan's father Rob, makes a surprise visit while touring with his band. Evan is excited while Alex is concerned Rob will disappoint their son. Meanwhile, Lauren and Maya start to connect as friends, but the relationship is threatened when Lauren realizes she doesn't fit in with Maya's clique. Both situations come to a head at the Don't Bothers' next game when Bombay kidnaps Rob, preventing him from catching his flight for a concert gig, thus making sure he attends Evan's game as promised, inspiring Evan to play his heart out, while Nick convinces the girls that their friendship is more important than social cliques. Evan's performance helps the Don't Bothers win their first game, but Trevor, Stephanie's son, and one of Evan's former teammates, informs Evan that Coach T was at the game and wants to meet with him.
| 6 | 6 | "Spirit of the Ducks" | Steve Brill | Todd Linden | April 30, 2021 |
Bombay bumps into Fulton Reed, one of the original Mighty Ducks, when a piece of flying concrete smashes his car window and he learns about the "Spirit of the Ducks" gala, celebrating the Ducks' 25th anniversary. Meanwhile, Evan is invited back to the Ducks by Coach T and seriously considers rejoining, going so far as attending a practice, but ultimately decides to remain with his friends. Bombay learns that he wasn't invited to the gala because he doesn't represent "the best of the Ducks". He reunites with some of the old Ducks who, upon learning he wasn't invited, gatecrash the party and stand up for their former coach. The next day, the older Ducks join the Don't Bothers for a scrimmage at the Ice Palace, while Bombay accepts the assistant coach position for the Don't Bothers. After the practice, however, a video of Evan practicing with the Ducks is posted online and the Don't Bothers walk out in disgust.
| 7 | 7 | "Pond Hockey" | Melissa Kosar | Marissa Berlin | May 7, 2021 |
The Don't Bothers are still stung by Evan's betrayal, especially Sofi and Sam. So, Alex calls a players only meeting and forces them into the locker room to hash it out, until the power at the Ice Palace fails. Bombay improvises and takes the team to the same frozen pond he used as a kid to help hone the team's instincts and that helps Evan find a way to earn back his squad's trust by giving up the captaincy. Alex, meanwhile, starts to doubt her abilities as coach after seeing how Bombay is with the team and decides to step aside and let him take over. Bombay, however, admits he deliberately cut the power to the Ice Palace and reminds Alex that she had reawakened his love of the game and encourages Alex to take the reins and lead the team. Evan makes amends with Sofi and prevents Sam from quitting. After all the drama, the Don't Bothers come together for another late win.
| 8 | 8 | "Change on the Fly" | Michael Spiller | Damir Konjicija & Dario Konjicija | May 14, 2021 |
Inspired by Alex's "putting fun first" motto, the Don't Bothers continue to perform better than expected. But after continuous praise from Sofi's parents, the temptation of winning brainwashes Alex and she starts overworking the team, which makes them sour, despite continuing their winning streak. Logan, who still struggles to skate, gets a lesson from Bombay who, after seeing Logan make pancakes before practice, realizes he has potential for stick-handling. Nick, who had just scored his first goal in the previous game, becomes tired about everyone trying to one-up him, but when Logan talks to him, Logan reveals that he is envious of Nick's relationship with his mothers. The Don't Bothers play their final game of the regular season with a place at States on the line. Alex refuses Bombay's suggestion of putting Logan in the game several times. However, Nick tricks her, allowing Logan to take his place and Logan uses "the Michigan" to score the game-winning goal and send the Don't Bothers through. However, an angry Alex berates the team in the locker room for going against her and the squad realizes that she had gotten too focused on winning. Evan determines that his mother needs to be fired.
| 9 | 9 | "Head Games" | Melissa Kosar | Rita Hsiao | May 21, 2021 |
Evan fires Alex from her coaching position. She accepts it, realizing her mistakes and decides to go to her office to get work done. Evan wants to ask Sofi to the party being held for the players the night before the tournament, but she responds in a confusing manner, leading him to ask podcaster Mary Joe for advice. But she corners him into asking her instead, just to make Nick jealous. Sofi and Nick notice this and Sofi decides to show up with Trevor, and Nick is jealous, since he has a crush on Mary Joe. At work, Alex inadvertently finds out that Stephanie and her husband Clark are getting a divorce and she bonds with her depressed boss, finding similarities in their lives, with Stephanie praising Alex for having a happy child. Meanwhile, Bombay and Coach T have a drink at the bar, but Coach T was just manipulating Bombay to drop the secret that he wasn't eligible in the NCAA to coach due to a mistake Bombay made years ago. This leads to the tournament committee disqualifying Bombay and the Don't Bothers. Alex and Stephanie, having received a call from Evan, show up as Bombay's "attorneys" and expose a mistake on the league's side of the argument and the league decides to let Bombay coach. Evan gets Mary Joe and Nick to hang out and he reconciles after his fight with Sofi, later revealing their feelings to each other.
| 10 | 10 | "State of Play" | Michael Spiller | Marissa Berlin & Todd Linden | May 28, 2021 |
The Don't Bothers win through to the finals at States to face-off against the Ducks. However, Sofi's leg injury gets the best of her and refuses to sit out the game, as this would make the Don't Bothers forfeit for not having enough players. The rest of the Don't Bothers decide her injury is not worth the trophy and all agree to make her sit out. The Ducks are crowned champions due to the forfeit. On the way out of the rink, the Ducks and Don't Bothers meet each other in the corridor and agree to play a game at the Ice Palace with a bet on the line (if the Ducks win, the Don't Bothers must drop out of the league, and if the Don't Bothers win, then they get the Ducks name). The game at the Ice Palace starts off with the Don't Bothers scoring first. Coach T encourages his team to play dirty since there is only one referee. After the second period, the Ducks are ahead by two. In the Don't Bothers locker room the team comes together once more and Bombay surprises them with the original Ducks uniforms. The Don't Bothers tie the game up and then use the Flying V formation to score the game-winning goal and securing the Ducks name. Later, Bombay resurfaces the ice with a Zamboni and the original Ducks logo at center ice in the Ice Palace.

=== Season 2 (2022) ===
| No. overall | No. in season | Title | Directed by | Written by | Original release date |
|---|---|---|---|---|---|
| 11 | 1 | "Ice Breaker" | Melissa Kosar | Josh Goldsmith & Cathy Yuspa & Steve Brill | September 28, 2022 |
The Ice Palace is condemned and, while Fulton Reed and Dean Portman work on renovating the rundown rink, Alex takes the Mighty Ducks to EPIC, an elite summer hockey program in California run by Colin Cole, a former NHL player. Unfortunately, the invite was meant for the former Ducks and Cole asks them to leave. However, Alex gives an impassioned speech that convinces him to let them stay. The players gather for an "icebreaker" where Cole informs them they'll be competing for a chance to play in the World Hockey Summer Showcase in front of scouts from colleges and the NHL. They engage in an exercise to score goals, with each player being able to leave the ice once they do. The Mighty Ducks are quickly embarrassed by the more dominant and aggressive players but soon manage to get the hang of the game until it comes down to Nick against Cole's son, Jace. Nick scores and, despite Nick's and Alex's pleas to leave the fierce competition and return to Minnesota, Evan rallies the team into staying.
| 12 | 2 | "Out of Bounds" | Melissa Kosar | Todd Linden | October 5, 2022 |
The Mighty Ducks struggle to adjust to life at EPIC, including 5 a.m. wakeup calls, a strict nutrition regimen, and intense workouts. Cole gives each player a performance wristband, which monitors their overall fitness level, and ranks everyone's statistics on the "big board" in the middle of campus. The rankings will be used to draft teams for a tournament, with the winner playing a team from Canada in the annual Summer Showcase in front of scouts. Alex is not fond of monitoring the kids' fitness, and she and Cole clash over their philosophies on what a summer camp should entail. Cole takes note of Evan's on-ice skill, while Alex meets Jace, Cole's son who is frustrated with the pressure his dad puts on him. While on a run, a frustrated Nick decides to flee and gets lost in the woods. Sofi and the rest of the Mighty Ducks search for him, but Evan attends a clinic held by Cole instead, which upsets his teammates. Alex finds Nick at a nearby hotel and convinces him to never give up on a difficult situation; Nick returns to EPIC and is welcomed back with open arms.
| 13 | 3 | "Coach Classic" | Melissa Kosar | Matthew Carlson | October 12, 2022 |
Cole announces the annual "Coach Classic" is upcoming, where ten players will be chosen to compete in a game against the coaches. Sofi discovers that Jace is one of the top players of his age in the country, but he has been struggling on the ice and grown weary of his father's intensity. Evan, who desperately wants to be chosen for the game, is passed over, while Jace is selected. Jace wants no part of the game, so he gives his jersey to Evan, but Alex refuses to let him play out of fear for his safety. Alex eventually relents after she becomes the coach of the kids' team. During the game, Cole switches sides and plays with the kids, but the game ends in a tie after Jace is unable to score the winning goal. Evan grows jealous of Jace and Sofi's budding relationship.
| 14 | 4 | "Draft Day" | Lauren Graham | Josh Goldsmith & Cathy Yuspa | October 19, 2022 |
The eight teams of EPIC prepare for the annual draft to create teams for the summer camp. A lottery is held to determine the draft order: Cole wins the first overall pick, while Alex will pick last. With Nick's help, Alex offers the other coaches various favors in order to trade up on the draft board. Alex convinces Cole to swap her second overall pick for the first. Evan desperately wants to be drafted by Cole, while Sofi is surprised at how serious he is taking the camp. The two attempt to rekindle their relationship, but Evan decides against sneaking out at night, leaving Sofi frustrated. At the draft, Alex selects Nick with the first overall pick, despite finishing last on the big board. Alex proceeds to draft all of the Mighty Ducks players, except Evan, who is drafted onto Cole's team, "Dominate". In return, Alex drafts Jace with her final pick. Following the draft, Evan and Sofi break up, and Evan leaves with his new teammates.
| 15 | 5 | "Icing on the Cake" | Michael McDonald | Marissa Berlin | October 26, 2022 |
Evan and Nick struggle to adjust now that they're on different teams. As the teams begin practice, Cole puts Evan and his Dominate team through rigorous training on the ice and in the weight room, while the Mighty Ducks hold leisurely exercises outdoors. Nick invites Evan to his birthday party, but Cole schedules a practice for that night, prompting Alex to unsuccessfully ask Cole to excuse Evan. During practice, Evan, not knowing his mom asked Cole to excuse him, feigns illness, but Cole sees through the lie and benches him for their first game. Without Evan, Nick's birthday party is a disaster, but Evan eventually arrives and everyone sneaks into the kitchen after hours for ice cream. Meanwhile, Maya attempts to help Sofi become more rebellious, and Jace takes a liking to her.
| 16 | 6 | "Twigs" | David Katzenberg | Jessica Watson | November 2, 2022 |
The tournament begins, and the Mighty Ducks are blown out in their first two games. The team has a bonding session, where they each hold a twig and talk about a negative emotion affecting them. Jace, feeling it's pointless, quits the team. At the end of the meeting, Alex puts the twigs together and notes how hard it is to break them all at once, and as a team they are unbreakable. Their next game is against Dominate, and the rejuvenated Mighty Ducks force a 2-2 tie at the end of the second period. During the intermission, Nick has an encounter with A.J., the top player on Dominate, who admits they are playing with their off-hands in order to make the game seem close. The revelation deflates the team and turns them against Evan, and Alex asks Cole to have his players play properly in the third period; Dominate promptly wins the game in a rout. Afterwards, Jace, upset over what his father did, asks to rejoin the team. They accept him, but Sofi admits they need help. Later, Alex makes a phone call to the Anaheim Ducks.
| 17 | 7 | "Spirit of the Ducks Part 2" | Josh Duhamel | Matthew Carlson & Todd Linden | November 9, 2022 |
On an off day, the Mighty Ducks take an unsanctioned field trip to the Honda Center, home of the Anaheim Ducks. Jace is hesitant to enter the rink, and later confides in Sofi that one summer prior, his hockey struggles started there after he put the puck into his own net in front of numerous scouts. Sofi attempts to motivate him, and the two kiss. Meanwhile, the teams are picking their captains, and A.J. nominates himself to be the captain of Dominate. Evan intervenes, and says while he doesn't have A.J.'s talent, he brings more heart and fight. They decide to settle the captaincy by having an ice bath challenge, which Evan wins. The Mighty Ducks have practice, where Alex encourages them to incorporate a new technique into their game. They are later joined by players from the Anaheim Ducks. Following practice, the team nominates Jace as their captain. That night, Cole confronts Alex for leaving the campus, but Alex shows him a video of Jace practicing with the Ducks. Overwhelmed at seeing Jace finally succeed, he kisses Alex.
| 18 | 8 | "Trade Rumors" | Jay Chandrasekhar | Patrick Kang & Michael Levin | November 16, 2022 |
News of Cole and Alex kissing spreads quickly throughout EPIC, and the two agree to go on a date. The rejuvenated Mighty Ducks go on a winning streak and advance to the championship game against Dominate. A depressed Evan grows jealous of Sofi's budding relationship with Jace and admits to Alex he misses being a Duck, while Cole takes great interest in Jace's on-ice skills. Cole speaks with Alex and proposes trading Evan to the Mighty Ducks in exchange for Jace. Evan later overhears this and begs Cole not to trade him, but Cole wonders if Evan truly has a future in hockey and suggests he would be better off with his friends. The trade rumor greatly upsets players on both teams and is vetoed by Alex the night before the championship game.
| 19 | 9 | "Summer Breezers" | Jay Chandrasekhar | Josh Goldsmith & Cathy Yuspa | November 23, 2022 |
Prior to the championship game, Cole and Alex host a banquet for both teams, but the players are upset with them over the trade rumor. Tensions between the teams spark pushing and shoving and ultimately a food fight before the banquet is canceled. As the teams continue to argue while cleaning up, Sofi calms everyone down by saying hockey isn't everything, and having fun and making friends is the most important value at any summer camp. On the day of the championship game, neither team shows up to the rink, and they are later found at a lake near campus enjoying a summer day. Cole relents and joins in on the fun, and begins to mend his relationship with Jace. That night, Cole receives word that a team from Canada is soon arriving, who are scheduled to play the winner of the Mighty Ducks vs. Dominate game in the Summer Showcase. Since the championship game was never played, the two teams decide to merge. The next day, the Canadian team arrives at EPIC, who are led by Coach T.
| 20 | 10 | "Lights Out" | Melissa Kosar | Josh Goldsmith & Cathy Yuspa | November 30, 2022 |
Cole declares that the unified team will play as the Ducks in the Summer Showcase, and he will watch as a fan to avoid pressuring Jace. The game is held at the Anaheim Ducks practice arena, where Ducks player Cam Fowler gifts the team new jerseys for the game. Nick sprains his ankle, and he is unable to play. The Ducks struggle as Evan is distracted by scouts and Jace feels the pressure again. Coach T uses the "Flying V" out of spite in his quest for revenge. After the second period, Sofi, Evan, and the team let Jace know that he is a special player. In the third period, Cole rejoins the Ducks and Nick takes over for Rich Eisen on commentary. The Ducks earn a penalty shot at the end of the game, which Evan scores, as Jace turned down the chance to convince Evan that he has not reached is hockey "ceiling". After the game, Sofi, Evan, and A.J. are approached by scouts. As summer at EPIC comes to a close, Sofi and Jace share a goodbye kiss. Nick attempts to cheer up a sad Evan, reminding him that he's the one traveling back home with Sofi, and there is still hope for their relationship.

== Production ==
=== Development ===
By 2018, Steve Brill and Jordan Kerner, who respectively served as writer and producer for the 1992 film The Mighty Ducks, pitched to ABC Signature head Tracy Underwood an idea for a TV series based on the film, which was approved for development.

On January 22, 2018, it was reported that a half-hour The Mighty Ducks TV series was being developed by ABC Signature Studios, with Brill set to write and executive-produce the series. The series was being shopped to several networks and streaming services by the studio. On November 8, 2018, it was reported that the series will be released on Disney's streaming service, Disney+. On November 6, 2019, it was reported that Josh Goldsmith, Cathy Yuspa, George Heller, and Brad Petrigala will co-executive-produce the series alongside Brill. On February 12, 2020, Goldsmith and Yuspa were revealed to be serving a co-creators and showrunners for the series, while Kerner and James Griffiths were revealed to be co-executive-producing the series, with star Lauren Graham also being credited as co-executive producer. On August 2, 2021, Disney+ renewed the series for a second season. On February 17, 2023, Disney+ cancelled the series after two seasons.

=== Casting ===
In February 2020, Lauren Graham and Brady Noon were cast in the series as the lead roles, with Emilio Estevez returning to reprise his role as Gordon Bombay, in addition to executive producing, as well as directing an episode. Swayam Bhatia, Taegen Burns, Julee Cerda, Bella Higginbotham, Luke Islam, Kiefer O'Reilly, Maxwell Simkins, De'Jon Watts were also cast in undisclosed roles. On March 18, 2021, it was reported that Elden Henson, Matt Doherty, Vincent LaRusso, Marguerite Moreau, Garette Henson, and Justin Wong would reprise their roles from The Mighty Ducks films for the sixth episode of the series. In November 2021, it was reported that Estevez's season 2 option would not be picked up due to creative differences and a contract dispute. On January 24, 2022, Josh Duhamel was cast in a starring role for the second season. On March 25, 2022, Naveen Paddock joined the cast as a new series regular while Margot Anderson-Song, Noah Baird, Stephnie Weir, Connor DeWolfe, Timm Sharp, and Tiffany Denise Hobbs joined the cast in recurring roles.

=== Filming ===
Filming for The Mighty Ducks was scheduled to begin on February 18, 2020, and end on June 11, 2020. Filming took place in Vancouver, British Columbia, Canada. James Griffiths served as a director for the series. In August 2020, it was announced that filming could officially begin after Disney TV Studios made a deal with British Columbia unions about testing the cast and crew members for the ongoing COVID-19 pandemic. Filming officially resumed in September 2020 and concluded on December 17, 2020. Filming for the second season began in early 2022.

=== Promotion ===
In March 2021, ahead of the series premiere, and along with the NHL's return to ESPN, Disney+ and ESPN collaborated on a 30 for 30 promotional featurette in partnership with Cheerios entitled The Legend of the Flying V on the championship game between the original Ducks and the Hawks, shown in the climactic scene of The Mighty Ducks. Among those who provide commentary are Don't Bothers members Sofi, Evan, Nick, Koob, Maya and Lauren along with original Ducks Fulton, Lester, and Connie – all played by their original actors ahead of their return in Game Changers – United States women's hockey forward and Olympic gold medalist Meghan Duggan, retired NHL forward and TNT hockey analyst Anson Carter and ESPN hockey analysts and SportsCenter anchors Linda Cohn, John Buccigross and Steve Levy.

== Release ==
The Mighty Ducks: Game Changers was released on Disney+ on March 26, 2021. The second season was released on September 28, 2022.

The series made its linear premiere on Freeform on January 1, 2023.

== Reception ==
=== Critical response ===
On Rotten Tomatoes, the series holds an approval rating of 87% based on 39 critic reviews, with an average rating of 6.8/10. The website's critical consensus reads, "Game Changers doesn't quite flip the puck, but it has enough heart and good humor to make The Mighty Ducks proud." On Metacritic, it has a weighted average score of 72 out of 100 based on 16 critic reviews, indicating "generally favorable reviews".

Caroline Framke of Variety said Game Changers manages to be a solid follow-up, stating the series manages to provide a sharp update to a timeless story without relying too much on nostalgia, and praised the performance of the actors. Robert Daniels of Polygon applauded the humor of the series, claiming it offers a hysterical critique of present-day youth sports, and stated it manages to be a light-hearted family-friendly show. Joel Keller of Decider wrote that Lauren Graham represents the best asset of the show, praised the performances of the cast members, and complimented the writing, saying the dialogues are sharp and entertaining. Daniel Fienberg of The Hollywood Reporter praised the performances of the actors, complimented the series for its inclusive messaging, and found it sincere and emotional at times, despite calling the narrative flaccid. Ashley Moulton of Common Sense Media rated the series 3 out of 5 stars, complimented the depiction of positive messages, stating the show promotes perseverance and positivity, and found agreeable the presence of role models, citing the gender and racial diversity across the main cast.

=== Accolades ===
| Year | Award | Category | Nominee(s) | Result | Ref. |
|---|---|---|---|---|---|
| 2021 | ReFrame Stamp | IMDbPro Top 200 Scripted TV Recipients | The Mighty Ducks: Game Changers | Won | |
| 2022 | Artios Awards | Outstanding Achievement in Casting - Children's Pilot and Series (Live Action) | Alexis Frank Koczara, Christine Smith Shevchenko, Jana Jacques Lind, Tiffany Mak, Gianna Butler | Nominated | |
| 2023 | Kids' Choice Awards | Favorite Kids TV Show | The Mighty Ducks: Game Changers | Nominated | |
| 2023 | Kids' Choice Awards | Favorite Male TV Star (Kids) | Brady Noon | Nominated | |
