= The Mighty Ducks =

Disney media franchise

- Created by: Steven Brill
- Original work: The Mighty Ducks
- Owner: The Walt Disney Company
- Years: 1992–2022

Films and television
- Film(s): The Mighty Ducks (1992); D2: The Mighty Ducks (1994); D3: The Mighty Ducks (1996)
- Television series: The Mighty Ducks: Game Changers (2021–2022)
- Animated series: Mighty Ducks: The Animated Series (1996–1997)

Miscellaneous
- Professional ice hockey team: Mighty Ducks of Anaheim (1993–2006)^{*}
- ^{*} Today known as the Anaheim Ducks, which are no longer owned by Disney.

The Mighty Ducks is an American media franchise. It features a trilogy of live-action films released in the 1990s by Walt Disney Pictures and a live-action sequel television series, as well as an animated television series by Walt Disney Television Animation and a real-world hockey team in the National Hockey League. The movies revolve around a Twin Cities ice hockey team, composed of young players that stick together throughout various challenges. Despite negative reviews from film critics, the trilogy's commercial success paved the way for the franchise's expansion.

The franchise has various releases in other media, including theme park and hotel attractions.

== Films ==
| Film | U.S. release date | Director | Screenwriter(s) | Story by | Producers |
|---|---|---|---|---|---|
| The Mighty Ducks | October 2, 1992 | Stephen Herek | Steven Brill | Steven Brill | Jon Avnet and Jordan Kerner |
| D2: The Mighty Ducks | March 25, 1994 | Sam Weisman | Steven Brill | Steven Brill | Jon Avnet and Jordan Kerner |
| D3: The Mighty Ducks | October 4, 1996 | Robert Lieberman | Steven Brill & Jim Burnstein | Kenneth Johnson & Jim Burnstein | Jon Avnet and Jordan Kerner |

=== The Mighty Ducks (1992) ===
The Mighty Ducks film trilogy home release cover art.

After being pulled over for drunk driving, Minneapolis-based attorney Gordon Bombay is sentenced to 500 hours of community service coaching youth hockey. There, he meets the District 5 peewee hockey team, perennial losers who finish at the bottom of the league standings year after year. They are shut out every game and lose by at least five goals. The players learn Bombay was once a player for the Hawks (a team in the same league) but left hockey because of the embarrassment that followed after a failed attempt at a penalty shot at the end of regulation, causing them to lose in overtime. This cost them a peewee championship (the only year that the Hawks ever lost). With the help of Coach Bombay and a desperately needed infusion of cash and equipment from Bombay's law firm, the players learn the fundamentals of the sport. Soon enough, the District 5 team, now christened the Ducks after Bombay's employer Gerald Ducksworth, start winning games and manage to make the playoffs. They reach the finals and add new player Adam Banks, an ex-Hawk who is a talented player and an asset for the Ducks. Bombay faces the Hawks, the team he grew up playing for, still led by Jack Reilly, the same coach Bombay played for. The Ducks win the title game on a penalty shot by Bombay's protege Charlie.

=== D2: The Mighty Ducks (1994) ===
Inspired by his own players, Bombay decides to try out in the hockey minor leagues and becomes the star player for the fictional Minnehaha Waves, with an easy pathway to the NHL. After a career-ending knee injury, he is offered a chance to coach a team representing the United States in the Junior Goodwill Games. For this, he reunites most of his Ducks (while 5 of them have moved away) and introduces them to five new players from across the country to form Team USA. While they win several early games, the lure of celebrity eventually becomes a distraction to both Bombay and the players, and reality kicks in when they lose against Team Iceland in an embarrassing defeat. Frustrated, Bombay drives his players even harder, yet Team USA continues to suffer, until they come across a street hockey team who teaches them how to play like "the real Team USA". New player Russ Tyler (Kenan Thompson), who earlier heckled Team USA during its matches, is recruited into the roster. Bombay realizes the most important thing is to have fun and after a change in attitude, the Ducks redeem themselves by working up the playoff ladder to meet Team Iceland in the finals. Team USA proves to be a match for Iceland, but the game ends in a tie, resulting in a shootout which - due to fast glove of new goalie Julie Gaffney - Team USA ends up winning the championship. They win the trophy.

=== D3: The Mighty Ducks (1996) ===
The movie shifts focus from Bombay to protégé Charlie Conway (Joshua Jackson). After their victory at the Junior Goodwill Games, Charlie and his teammates are awarded scholarships to Eden Hall Academy (a fictitious name from crossing Southwestern suburb Eden Prairie, Cretin-Derham Hall, and Saint Thomas Academy), a prestigious Minnesota high school Bombay attended. Their arrival is met with hostility from the varsity team (mainly consisting of players who are members of rich families, whose younger siblings were cut from the junior varsity team to make room for the Ducks), as well as Bombay's hand-picked successor, Ted Orion (Jeffrey Nordling), whose emphasis on defensive two-way hockey irks Charlie. Not wanting to be on a team led by Orion, who he believes to be a washed-up former professional player, Charlie leaves the team, but rejoins as he learns the truth about Orion from Bombay. Charlie and Orion quickly bond in time for the JV-Varsity Showdown, which Adam Banks (Vincent LaRusso), uses to get back onto the JV team after being scorned on for making the Varsity team. Thanks in large part to the work of Charlie, the Ducks win on a shorthanded goal in the dying seconds of the game from unlikely goal scorer Greg Goldberg (who is converted from goalie to rejoin the JV defenseman).

== Television ==
| Series | Season | Episodes | Originally released | | |
| Series | Season | Episodes | First released | Last released | Network |
|---|---|---|---|---|---|
| Mighty Ducks: The Animated Series | 1 | 26 | September 6, 1996 | January 17, 1997 | ABC |
| The Mighty Ducks: Game Changers | 1 | 10 | March 26, 2021 | May 28, 2021 | Disney+ |
| The Mighty Ducks: Game Changers | 2 | 10 | September 28, 2022 | November 30, 2022 | Disney+ |

=== Animation ===
Mighty Ducks: The Animated Series, aired on the American Broadcasting Company for one season consisting of 26 episodes, from 1996 to 1997. Created in a collaboration between Marty Isenberg, Robert N. Skir, and David Wise, the show ran regularly during The Disney Afternoon block. The series takes place in a futuristic alternate anthropomorphic-universe and follows the adventures of humanoid-duck superheroes.

The series theme song, written by Carl Swander Johnson, was performed by Mickey Thomas of Jefferson Starship and Starship fame.

=== Live-action ===
A live-action television series based on the original films was in the early stages of development at ABC Signature Studios, with screenwriter Steven Brill and producer Jordan Kerner being attached to the series. The Mighty Ducks: Game Changers was released for Disney+ streaming service.

The plot centers around a 13-year-old boy - whose mother helps him assemble a new team, find a coach and build a rink where they can play - when he gets kicked off the junior division of the Mighty Ducks hockey team. Emilio Estevez reprised his role as Coach Gordon Bombay in the series. The series premiered on March 26, 2021, running for 2 seasons.

== Main cast and characters ==
Character
| Character | The Mighty Ducks | D2: The Mighty Ducks | D3: The Mighty Ducks | Mighty Ducks: The Animated Series | The Mighty Ducks: Game Changers | |
| Character | The Mighty Ducks | D2: The Mighty Ducks | D3: The Mighty Ducks | Mighty Ducks: The Animated Series | Season 1 | Season 2 |
|---|---|---|---|---|---|---|
| Character | 1992 | 1994 | 1996 | 1996 – 1997 | 2021 | 2022 |
| Coach Gordon Bombay | Emilio Estevez | Emilio Estevez | Emilio Estevez | | Emilio Estevez | |
| Hans | Joss Ackland | | Joss Ackland | | | |
| Coach Jack Reilly | Lane Smith | | | | | |
| Casey Conway | Heidi Kling | | Heidi Kling | | | |
| Gerald Ducksworth | Josef Sommer | | | | | |
| Charlie Conway | Joshua Jackson | Joshua Jackson | Joshua Jackson | | | |
| Fulton Reed | Elden Ryan Ratliff | Elden Ryan Ratliff | Elden Ryan Ratliff | | Elden Henson | |
| Greg Goldberg | Shaun Weiss | Shaun Weiss | Shaun Weiss | | | |
| Lewis | M.C. Gainey | | | | | |
| Lester Averman | Matt Doherty | Matt Doherty | Matt Doherty | | Matt Doherty | |
| Jesse Hall | Brandon Quintin Adams | Brandon Quintin Adams | | | | |
| Peter Mark | J.D. Daniels | | | | | |
| Dave Karp | Aaron Schwartz | | | | | |
| Guy Germaine | Garette Ratliff Henson | Garette Ratliff Henson | Garette Ratliff Henson | | Garette Ratliff Henson | |
| Connie "the Velvet Hammer" Moreau | Marguerite Moreau | Marguerite Moreau | Marguerite Moreau | | Marguerite Moreau | |
| Tammy Duncan | Jane Plank | | | | | |
| Terry Hall | Jussie Smollett | | | | | |
| Adam "Cake Eater" Banks | Vincent Larusso | Vincent Larusso | Vincent Larusso | | Vincent A. Larusso | |
| Tommy Duncan | Danny Tamberelli | | | | | |
| McGill | Michael Ooms | | | | | |
| Larson | Casey Garven | | | | | |
| Judge Weathers | George Coe | | | | | |
| Don Tibbles | | Michael Tucker | | | | |
| Jan | | Jan Rubeš | | | | |
| Michelle McKay | | Kathryn Erbe | | | | |
| Dean Portman | | Aaron Lohr | Aaron Lohr | | | |
| Dwayne Robertson | | Ty O'Neal | Ty O'Neal | | | |
| Russell "Russ" Tyler | | Kenan Thompson | Kenan Thompson | | | |
| Luis Mendoza | | Mike Vitar | Mike Vitar | | | |
| Julie "The Cat" Gaffney | | Colombe Jacobsen | Colombe Jacobsen | | | |
| Ken "Little Bash Brother" Wu | | Justin Wong | Justin Wong | | Justin Wong | |
| Coach Wolf Stansson | | Carsten Norgaard | | | | |
| Maria | | Maria Ellingsen | | | | |
| Gunnar Stahl | | Scott Whyte | | | | |
| Coach Ted Orion | | | Jeffrey Nordling | | | |
| Cole | | | Michael Cudlitz | | | |
| Rick Riley | | | Christopher Orr | | | |
| Scott Holland | | | Scott Whyte | | | |
| Wildwing Flashblade | | | | Ian Ziering | | |
| Nosedive Flashblade | | | | Steve Mackall | | |
| Duke L'Orange | | | | Jeff Bennett | | |
| Mallory McMallard | | | | Jennifer Hale | | |
| Tanya Vanderflock | | | | April Winchell | | |
| Check "Grin" Hardwing | | | | Brad Garrett | | |
| Canard Thunderbeak | | | | Townsend Coleman | | |
| Coach Alex Morrow | | | | | Lauren Graham | Lauren Graham |
| Evan Morrow | | | | | Brady Noon | Brady Noon |
| Nick Ganz | | | | | Maxwell Simkins | Maxwell Simkins |
| Sofi Hanson-Bhatt | | | | | Swayam Bhatia | Swayam Bhatia |
| Stephanie Reddick | | | | | Julee Cerda | |
| Jordan "Koob" Koobler | | | | | Luke Islam | Luke Islam |
| Lauren Gibby | | | | | Bella Higginbotham | |
| Maya Kasper | | | | | Taegen Burns | Taegen Burns |
| Logan LaRue | | | | | Kiefer O'Reilly | |
| Adib "Sam" Samitar | | | | | De'Jon Watts | De'Jon Watts |
| Daryl "Coach T" Tingman | | | | | Dylan Playfair | Dylan Playfair |
| Colin Cole | | | | | | Josh Duhamel |
| Jace Cole | | | | | | Naveen Paddock |

NHL cameos

Each movie showcases a cameo appearance by National Hockey League players:

- The Mighty Ducks - Mike Modano and Basil McRae.
- D2: The Mighty Ducks - Chris Chelios, Cam Neely, Luc Robitaille, and Wayne Gretzky.
- D3: The Mighty Ducks - Paul Kariya; who at that time, had also been captain for the Mighty Ducks of Anaheim.
- The Mighty Ducks: Game Changers - Trevor Zegras, Troy Terry, and Max Jones; all three appear in the Season 2 episode, Spirit of the Ducks Part 2.

Cam Fowler; appears in the series finale and gives the Mighty Ducks team the then unreleased Reverse Retro jerseys for their game.

=== Fictional team roster ===
The following is the roster of the fictional players for the team. Provided are their jersey numbers, playing positions and indication of their appearances in movies and television series.

| No. | Player | Hometown | Position | D1 | D2 | D3 | GC |
|---|---|---|---|---|---|---|---|
| 00 | Guy Germaine | St. Paul, Minnesota | F | check | check | check | check |
| 1 | Terry Hall | Minneapolis | F | check | X mark | X mark | X mark |
| 2 | Tommy Duncan | Minneapolis | D | check | X mark | X mark | X mark |
| 4 | Lester Averman | Brooklyn Park, Minnesota | F | check | check | check | check |
| 5 | Tammy Duncan | Minneapolis | F | check | X mark | X mark | X mark |
| 6 | Julie Gaffney | Bangor, Maine | G | X mark | check | check | X mark |
| 7 | Dwayne Robertson | Austin, Texas | F | X mark | check | check | X mark |
| 9 | Jesse Hall | Minneapolis | F | check | check | X mark | X mark |
| 11 | Dave Karp | Minneapolis | D | check | X mark | X mark | X mark |
| 16 | Ken Wu | San Francisco | F | X mark | check | check | check |
| 18 | Connie Moreau | Minneapolis | F | check | check | check | check |
| 21 | Dean Portman | Chicago | D | X mark | check | check | check |
| 22 | Luis Mendoza | Miami | F | X mark | check | check | X mark |
| 24 | Peter Mark | Minneapolis | D | check | X mark | X mark | X mark |
| 33 | Greg Goldberg | Philadelphia | G/D | check | check | check | X mark |
| 44 | Fulton Reed | Stillwater, Minnesota | D/F | check | check | check | check |
| 56 | Russ Tyler | Los Angeles | D | X mark | check | check | X mark |
| 96 | Team Captain; Charlie Conway | Minneapolis | F | check | check | check | X mark |
| 99 | Adam Banks | Edina, Minnesota | F | check | check | check | check |

== Additional production and crew details ==
| Film | Crew/Detail | | | | | |
| Film | Composer | Cinematographer | Editor(s) | Production companies | Distributing company | Running time |
|---|---|---|---|---|---|---|
| The Mighty Ducks | David Newman | Thomas Del Ruth | Larry Brock & John F. Link | Walt Disney Pictures, Avnet/Kerner Productions, Touchwood Pacific Partners 1 | Buena Vista Pictures Distribution | 1hr 44mins |
| D2: The Mighty Ducks | J. A. C. Redford | Mark Irwin | John F. Link & Eric Sears | Walt Disney Pictures, Avnet/Kerner Productions | Buena Vista Pictures | 1hr 46mins |
| D3: The Mighty Ducks | J. A. C. Redford | David Hennings | Patrick Lussier | Walt Disney Pictures, Avnet/Kerner Productions | Buena Vista Pictures | 1hr 44mins |

== Reception ==
=== Box office performance ===
| Film | Box office gross | | | Box office ranking | | Budget | Ref. |
| Film | North America | Other territories | Worldwide | All time North America | All time worldwide | Budget | Ref. |
|---|---|---|---|---|---|---|---|
| The Mighty Ducks | $50,752,337 | not available | $50,752,337 | #1,702 | #2,715 | $10,000,000 | |
| D2: The Mighty Ducks | $45,604,206 | not available | $45,604,206 | #1,890 | #2,933 | not available | |
| D3: The Mighty Ducks | $22,936,273 | not available | $22,936,273 | #3,308 | #4,537 | not available | |
| Total | | | $119,292,816 | x̄ #2,300 (Note: x̄ represents the calculated average of the three theatrical films.) | x̄ #3,395 | | |

=== Critical and public response ===
| Film | Rotten Tomatoes | Metacritic | CinemaScore |
|---|---|---|---|
| The Mighty Ducks | 24% (30 reviews) | 46/100 (18 reviews) | A |
| D2: The Mighty Ducks | 20% (15 reviews) | —N/a | A |
| D3: The Mighty Ducks | 20% (15 reviews) | —N/a | A- |

=== Legacy ===
The Mighty Ducks series has become a cult classic. Several professional athletes have expressed their appreciation for the series, with NFL Arizona Cardinals' J.J. Watt and MLB Philadelphia Phillies' Bryce Harper among the trilogy's fans.

== NHL team ==
Following the financial success of the first film, the Mighty Ducks of Anaheim hockey team were founded in 1993, by The Walt Disney Company. The franchise was accepted by the NHL in December 1992, with an entrance fee of $50 million. Additionally, a brand-new arena, Anaheim Arena, was constructed for the team, located a short distance east of Disneyland. The team's name was derived from the first film. Philadelphia-arena management specialist Tony Tavares was appointed as the team president, while Jack Ferreira, became the Mighty Ducks' general manager.

Ron Wilson was selected to be the first head coach in the team's history. During the 1993 NHL entry draft, the Mighty Ducks drafted as their fourth overall pick Paul Kariya, who would be the face of the franchise for years. The initial roster had the lowest payroll in the NHL at only $7.9 million.

Under the leadership of team captain Troy Loney, the team finished the season at 33–46–5, a record-breaking number of wins for an expansion team. The Mighty Ducks sold out 27 of 41 home games and filled the Arrowhead Pond to 98.9% of its season capacity. Licensed merchandise shot to number one in sales among all NHL clubs. This was aided by the team's merchandise presence in Disney's theme parks and Disney Stores. The Walt Disney Company sold the franchise in 2005 to Henry and Susan Samueli, who along with then-general manager Brian Burke, changed the name of the team to the Anaheim Ducks before the 2006–07 season. That season, the team won its first Stanley Cup.

=== Season statistics ===
Key of colors and symbols
| Color/symbol | Explanation |
|---|---|
| ‡ | Conference champions |

Year by year listing of all seasons played by the Anaheim Ducks under Disney ownership
| NHL Season | Ducks season | Conference | Division | Regular season | | | | | | | | | | Postseason | | | | | |
| NHL Season | Ducks season | Conference | Division | CF | DF | GP | W | L | T | OT | Pts | GF | GA | GP | W | L | GF | GA | Result |
|---|---|---|---|---|---|---|---|---|---|---|---|---|---|---|---|---|---|---|---|
Mighty Ducks of Anaheim
| 1993–94^{[a]} | 1993–94^{[b]} | Western | Pacific | 9th | 4th | 84 | 33 | 46 | 5 | — | 71 | 229 | 251 | — | — | — | — | — | Did not qualify |
| 1994–95^{[c]} | 1994–95 | Western | Pacific | 12th | 6th | 48 | 16 | 27 | 5 | — | 37 | 125 | 164 | — | — | — | — | — | Did not qualify |
| 1995–96 | 1995–96 | Western | Pacific | 9th | 4th | 82 | 35 | 39 | 8 | — | 78 | 234 | 247 | — | — | — | — | — | Did not qualify |
| 1996–97 | 1996–97 | Western | Pacific | 4th | 2nd | 82 | 36 | 33 | 13 | — | 85 | 243 | 233 | 11 | 4 | 7 | 25 | 30 | Won Conference Quarterfinals vs. Phoenix Coyotes, 4–3; Lost Conference Semifinals vs. Detroit Red Wings, 0–4 |
| 1997–98 | 1997–98 | Western | Pacific | 12th | 6th | 82 | 26 | 43 | 13 | — | 65 | 205 | 261 | — | — | — | — | — | Did not qualify |
| 1998–99 | 1998–99 | Western | Pacific | 6th | 3rd | 82 | 35 | 34 | 13 | — | 83 | 215 | 206 | 4 | 0 | 4 | 6 | 17 | Lost Conference Quarterfinals vs. Detroit Red Wings, 0–4 |
| 1999–2000 | 1999–2000 | Western | Pacific | 9th | 5th | 82 | 34 | 33 | 12 | 3^{[d]} | 83 | 217 | 227 | — | — | — | — | — | Did not qualify |
| 2000–01 | 2000–01 | Western | Pacific | 15th | 5th | 82 | 25 | 41 | 11 | 5 | 66 | 188 | 245 | — | — | — | — | — | Did not qualify |
| 2001–02 | 2001–02 | Western | Pacific | 13th | 5th | 82 | 29 | 42 | 8 | 3 | 69 | 175 | 198 | — | — | — | — | — | Did not qualify |
| 2002–03 | 2002–03 | Western‡ | Pacific | 7th | 2nd | 82 | 40 | 27 | 9 | 6 | 95 | 203 | 193 | 21 | 15 | 6 | 45 | 40 | Won Conference Quarterfinals vs. Detroit Red Wings, 4–0; Won Conference Semifinals vs. Dallas Stars, 4–2; Won Conference Finals vs. Minnesota Wild, 4–0; Lost Stanley Cup Finals vs. New Jersey Devils, 3–4 |
| 2003–04 | 2003–04 | Western | Pacific | 12th | 4th | 82 | 29 | 35 | 10 | 8 | 76 | 184 | 213 | — | — | — | — | — | Did not qualify |
| 2004–05^{[e]} | 2004–05 | Western | Pacific | — | — | — | — | — | — | — | — | — | — | — | — | — | — | — | No playoffs due to lockout |
| 2005–06 | 2005–06 | Western | Pacific | 6th | 3rd | 82 | 43 | 27 | —^{[f]} | 12 | 98 | 254 | 229 | 16 | 9 | 7 | 46 | 36 | Won Conference Quarterfinals vs. Calgary Flames, 4–3; Won Conference Semifinals vs. Colorado Avalanche, 4–0; Lost Conference Finals vs. Edmonton Oilers, 1–4 |

== In other media ==
=== Video game ===
An electronic, handheld LCD game titled, Mighty Ducks and based on the animated series of the same name, was released in 1996. The game was developed, created, and released by Tiger Electronics.

=== Theme park attractions ===
==== Mighty Ducks: Pinball Slam ====
At the now-defunct DisneyQuest locations, Mighty Ducks: Pinball Slam featured as one of the theme park attractions. Opened by Disney Regional Entertainment (which was a subsidiary of Walt Disney Parks and Resorts), the line of limited, smaller-scaled locations included a number of indoor interactive rides and activities. The concept was short-lived and though there were meant to be various locations in numerous cities, the company ultimately opened two locations.

The ride itself allowed the audience to "become" a pinball in a gigantic projected pinball game; by rocking their "duck" back and forth, up to twelve players at a time control their corresponding pinball on the screen, attempting to collect the most points throughout the duration of the ride.

==== Disney's All-Star Movies Resort ====
Disney's All-Star Movies Resort, a "value" resort hotel located at the Walt Disney World Resort, features a Mighty Ducks-themed section and swimming pool.

=== Podcast ===
A podcast channel dedicated to the trilogy titled The Quack Attack, has over 200 episodes dedicated to the topic.

== Home media ==
The trilogy of films were released in a collection set on DVD and Blu-ray on September 2, 2002, and May 23, 2017, respectively.
