= Jordan Kerner =

American film producer

- Occupation: Film producer
- Years active: 1987–present
- Spouse: Nicola O'Shea
- Children: 3

Jordan Kerner is an American film producer. His producing credits includes Fried Green Tomatoes, The Mighty Ducks, George of the Jungle, Inspector Gadget, Charlotte's Web, and The Smurfs.

== Career ==
Kerner started his career at the CBS affiliate in San Francisco, KPIX, in 1971. In 1976, he became an attorney at the law firm of Ball, Hunt, Hart and Baerwitz. In 1977, he left to join CBS Entertainment as a program and talent negotiator. In 1978, he then switched to Universal Television for NBC, taking the position of assistant to the senior VP.

Two years later, he also took on the task of director of program development QM Productions. The following year, he changed jobs and became the director of dramatic series development at ABC Entertainment. He was promoted to vice president of dramatic development in 1983.

He held this position until 1986, when he formed The Avnet/Kerner Co., an independent production company, with Jon Avnet. A year later, his first feature was produced, called Less than Zero.

After another year, he had produced his first television movie, Side by Side. His acting debut was in Less than Zero (uncredited) and then George of the Jungle 2 (credited), in which he played an advertising executive in the first and an airline passenger in the second. The success of The Mighty Ducks gained the company attention to The Walt Disney Studios, which served a production partnership. During the time, the company was a member of the ACI board of directors, until it was sold to Pearson Television in 1995.

While running Avnet/Kerner, he teamed up with Rob Lee to form a television production company, Hidden Oaks Entertainment in 1999, and signed a deal with Big Ticket Television in 2001.

In 2001, he and Avnet parted ways and started separate companies with Kerner forming The Kerner Entertainment Company (which is mostly known as simply The K Entertainment Company), whose focus was on family-friendly entertainment. In 2002, the company appointed a four-year deal with Paramount Pictures to develop family films.

His mother was Jeannette Kerner, a stage and screen actress, who died in 2001, at the age of 85. He is married to Nicola O'Shea, and their daughters are Haley Lelean O'Shea Kerner, Grace Ellis O'Shea Kerner, and Lily Jeannette O'Shea Kerner.

In 2007, Kerner was appointed Dean of the School of Filmmaking at the prestigious University of North Carolina School of the Arts. In 2007, the company struck a deal with Walden Media.

== Filmography ==
He was a producer in all films unless otherwise noted.

=== Film ===
Year	Film	Credit	Notes	Ref.
1987	Less than Zero			
1990	Funny About Love			
1991	Fried Green Tomatoes			
1992	The Mighty Ducks			
1993	The Three Musketeers	Executive producer		
1994	D2: The Mighty Ducks			
1994	When a Man Loves a Woman			
1994	The War			
1995	Miami Rhapsody	Executive producer		
1996	Up Close & Personal			
1996	D3: The Mighty Ducks			
1997	George of the Jungle			
1997	Red Corner			
1999	Inspector Gadget			
2002	Snow Dogs			
2003	Inspector Gadget 2	Executive producer	Direct-to-video	
2003	George of the Jungle 2		Direct-to-video	
2006	Charlotte's Web			
2011	The Smurfs			
2013	The Smurfs 2			
2017	Smurfs: The Lost Village			
2021	Clifford the Big Red Dog			

As an actor

Year	Film	Role	Notes
2003	George of the Jungle 2	Airline Passenger	Direct-to-video

Thanks

Year	Film	Role
1999	Guinevere	The director wishes to thank

=== Television ===
Year	Title	Credit	Notes
1988	Side by Side	Executive producer	Television film
1988	My First Love	Executive producer	Television film
1989	Breaking Point		Television film
1989	Do You Know the Muffin Man?	Executive producer	Television film
1990	Heat Wave	Executive producer	Television film
1991	Backfield in Motion	Executive producer	Television film
1992	The Nightman	Executive producer	Television film
1993	The Switch		Television film
1993	For Their Own Good	Executive producer	Television film
1995	Naomi & Wynonna: Love Can Build a Bridge	Executive producer	Television film
1997	Dogs		
1998	Poodle Springs	Executive producer	Television film
1998	Mama Flora's Family	Executive producer	Television film
1999	My Last Love	Executive producer	Television film
2000	A House Divided	Executive producer	Television film
2001	Uprising		Television film
2001	Untitled Sisqó Project	Executive producer	Television pilot
2002	Red Skies	Executive producer	Television film
2003	A Wrinkle in Time	Executive producer	Television film
2021	The Mighty Ducks: Game Changers	Executive producer	
