= Matt Doherty (actor) =

American actor

- Born: June 22, 1978 (age 48); Harvey, Illinois, U.S.
- Occupation: Actor
- Years active: 1990–present

Matthew Doherty (born June 22, 1978) is an American actor. He is known for his role of Lester Averman in The Mighty Ducks trilogy.

== Early life and education ==
Doherty was born in Harvey, Illinois. He is a graduate of Thornwood High School, a southern suburban high school in the Chicago area. While at Thornwood, he played trumpet in the school's band. As part of Matthew's tutoring while on the set of The Mighty Ducks, he took trumpet lessons from Los Angeles studio musicians.

He graduated with a theatre degree from Northwestern University in 1999, where he was a member of the Phi Kappa Sigma fraternity.

== Career ==
He is best known for playing the roles of Lester Averman in The Mighty Ducks trilogy (although in D1 he is referred to as Dave Averman). However, Doherty's greatest role was as William "Heed" MacKenzie in So I Married An Axe Murderer. Doherty's character, Heed, is involved in two dialogues with Mike Myers as Charlie's father, Stuart Mackenzie. The first is when May Mackenzie, Charlie's mother, (Brenda Fricker) yells "Stuart! Bring in the Paper!" Interesting, and quite a propos, the "paper" is actually the eminent publication Weekly World News. Stuart then yells at Heed, "Heed! Paper! Now!" The second is when Charlie brings his new girlfriend (played by Nancy Travis), who grabs Stuart in a Grappling hold when Mike Myers, as Stuart, yells at Doherty, as Heed, "Heed! Pants! Now!"

Doherty had a role on the TV series Boston Public, in which he shared the screen with Northwestern alum Jeri Ryan. He did a commercial in which he parodied the sound-effect featured on The Six Million Dollar Man. He is then corrected by Lee Majors, who played the title character. Doherty is also set to return to the screen, alongside The Mighty Ducks co-star Emilio Estevez, once again as Lester Averman, in the Disney+ serial reboot of the movies, The Mighty Ducks: Game Changers.

== Filmography ==
=== Film ===
Year	Title	Role	Notes
1990	Home Alone	Steffan McCallister	
1992	The Babe	Boy in Car	
1992	Mo' Money	Kid	
1992	The Mighty Ducks	Les Averman	
1992	So I Married an Axe Murderer	Heed	
1994	D2: The Mighty Ducks	Les Averman	
1996	D3: The Mighty Ducks	Les Averman	
2001	Ghost World	Masterpiece Video Employee	
2003	Graduation Night	Drunk	
2012	Last Call	Fred	Uncredited
2012	Argo	Butler	Uncredited
2014	Hollows Grove	Tim Royce	

=== Television ===
Year	Title	Role	Notes
2000	ER	Eli Emerson	Episode: Match Made in Heaven
2000	Felicity	Computer Guy	Episode: Greeks and Geeks
2001	Boston Public	Lionel Pratt	3 episodes
2006	The Unit	Henderson	Episode: Old Home Week
2007	CSI: Miami	Corey Burton	Episode: Chain Reaction
2008	Bones	Gary Tushman	Episode: The Perfect Pieces in the Purple Pond
2009	Dark Blue	Boyd's Associate	Episode: Guns, Strippers and Wives
2009	CSI: Crime Scene Investigation	Twitchy Guy	Episode: Working Stiffs
2011	Grey's Anatomy	Carter	Episode: What Is It About Men
2014	Franklin & Bash	Ted Davis	Episode: Falcon's Nest
2015	Maron	Agent	Episode: Stroke of Luck
2017	Supernova 45	Jetset	TV movie
2017	Rosewood	Alan Rast	Episode: White Matter & the Ways Back
2021	The Mighty Ducks: Game Changers	Lester Averman	Episode: Spirit of the Ducks
