= Vincent LaRusso =

American actor (born 1978)

- Born: May 16, 1978 (age 48); Livingston, New Jersey, U.S.
- Education: Boston University (BS)
- Occupation: Actor
- Years active: 1992–present

Vincent Angelo LaRusso (born May 16, 1978) is an American actor. He is best known for playing Adam Banks in The Mighty Ducks trilogy.

== Early life and education ==
LaRusso is the youngest son of Anthony Sr. and Joann LaRusso, and grew up in Madison, New Jersey. He has an older brother named Anthony. He graduated from Madison High School in 1996 and earned a Bachelor of Science degree in business administration from Boston University.

== Career ==
LaRusso is best known for having starred as Adam Banks in all three Mighty Ducks films. He was originally slated to play a lesser character, Larson, before being elevated to a bigger role.

He is very active in participating in reunions, meet-and-greets, and events. He was in attendance at the 25th anniversary of the Anaheim Ducks hockey team in February 2019, along with many of the trilogy's co-stars.

LaRusso reprised his role as Adam Banks in an episode of the Disney+ series The Mighty Ducks: Game Changers in which several of the original Mighty Ducks return for a reunion.

== Personal life ==
LaRusso resides in New York City, where he works in the hospitality sector.

== Filmography ==
=== Film ===
Year	Title	Role	Notes
1992	The Mighty Ducks	Adam Banks	
1994	D2: The Mighty Ducks	Adam Banks	
1996	D3: The Mighty Ducks	Adam Banks	
2008	Superhero Movie	Bank Robber	

=== Television ===
Year	Title	Role	Notes
1992	Lifestories: Families in Crisis	Patrick	Episode: "Blood Brothers: The Joey DiPaolo Story"
2009	Dollhouse	Buddy #2	Episode: "Haunted"
2021	The Mighty Ducks: Game Changers	Adam Banks	Episode: "Spirit of the Ducks"
