= Jon Avnet =

American filmmaker (born 1949)

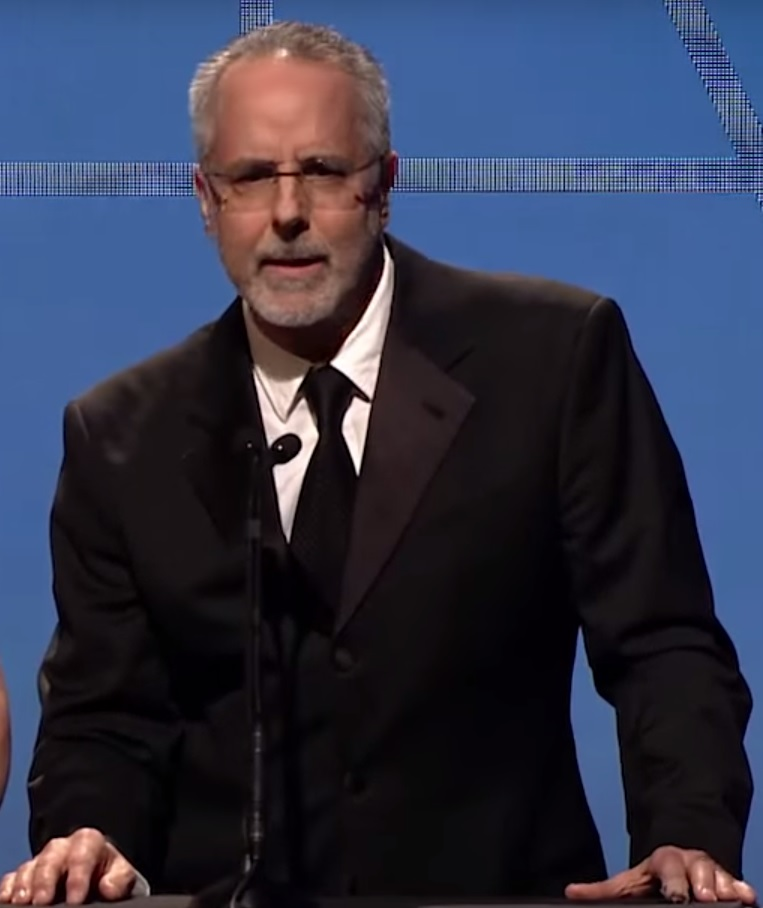
- Jon Avnet presenting Art Directors Guild award in 2014
- Born: Jonathan Michael Avnet; November 17, 1949 (age 76); Brooklyn, New York, U.S.
- Education: Sarah Lawrence College (BA); American Film Institute (MFA)
- Occupations: Film director, screenwriter, film producer
- Spouse: Barbara Brody (m. 1975)
- Children: 3
- Relatives: Charles Avnet (grandfather)

Jonathan Michael Avnet (born November 17, 1949) is an American director, writer, and producer whose career in film, television, and theater spans more than four decades. He has directed, written, or produced over 100 motion pictures, television films, series, and Broadway productions, and his work has received Academy Award, Emmy, Tony, Peabody, DGA, Golden Globe, and Humanitas recognition, among other honors. He is best known for producing Risky Business (1983), The Mighty Ducks trilogy (1992–1996), Sky Captain and the World of Tomorrow (2004), and Black Swan (2010), and directing Fried Green Tomatoes (1991), Up Close & Personal (1996), Red Corner (1997), Uprising (2001) and The Last Rodeo (2025).

== Early life and education ==
Avnet was born in Brooklyn, the son of Joan Bertha (née Grossman) and Lester Francis Avnet, a corporate executive with Avnet (a global distributor of IT & electronics) founded by his paternal grandfather, Charles Avnet. He has two siblings, Carole Avnet Rocherolle and Rosalind Avnet Lazarus. He attended Great Neck North High School in Great Neck, New York. Avnet attended the University of Pennsylvania and later earned a bachelor's degree from Sarah Lawrence College. He was awarded a directing fellowship at the American Film Institute (AFI), where he worked on John Cassavetes's A Woman Under the Influence and assisted David Lynch in completing Eraserhead (uncredited). He also moderated a seminar with one of his favorite directors, Bernardo Vertolucci, on The Conformist (1970) and Last Tango in Paris (1972) while he was a student at the AFI.

== Career ==
=== Early producing career ===
Avnet began his career as a producer. He formed Tisch/Avnet Productions in 1977 in partnership with Steve Tisch. This producing partnership that lasted until 1985, when Tisch founded its own company. Avnet later partnered with Jordan Kerner in 1986. His first major success was as a producer on Paul Brickman's Risky Business (1983) for Warner Bros., a commercial and critical hit credited with launching Tom Cruise's career. He also produced Brickman's Men Don't Leave (1990), starring Jessica Lange, Arliss Howard, and Kathy Bates, and featuring Chris O'Donnell's film debut.

In television, Avnet produced and contributed to the writing of The Burning Bed (1984), starring Farrah Fawcett. The film, based on the true story of Francine Hughes, received eight Emmy nominations and a Golden Globe nomination, and has been credited with contributing to the legal recognition of "battered woman syndrome" as a defense in domestic violence cases. It remains the highest rated movie of the week ever to air on NBC.

In 1984, he met television producer Leonard Hill and it was interested in building a movie alliance the following year with the top television movie producers. Until 1989, most of the product from The Movie Alliance was distributed by King Features Entertainment, after that, capital of its movie producers was raised enough to form its own independent syndicator ACI. ACI was sold to Pearson Television in 1995.

Avnet addressed political issues with his fourth film Red Corner in 1997, a movie about the Chinese legal system. Due to political complications they could not film in China, and instead filmed in Southern California. Avnet, however, did film a few scenes in Beijing and included some footage of actual Chinese executions.

=== Transition to directing ===
Avnet made his feature directorial debut with Fried Green Tomatoes (1991), which he also produced and co-wrote (uncredited). Based on Fannie Flagg's novel, the film starred Kathy Bates, Jessica Tandy, Mary Stuart Masterson, Mary-Louise Parker, and Cicely Tyson. It received Academy Award nominations for its screenplay and for Tandy's supporting performance, a Golden Globe nomination for Best Picture, and BAFTA nominations. The film won the GLADD award for best film. It was among Universal Pictures' top-grossing releases of the year.

Avnet's earlier television directing debut, Between Two Women (1986), starring Farrah Fawcett and Colleen Dewhurst, earned Dewhurst her first Emmy Award.

Avnet went on to direct The War (1994), starring Kevin Costner and Elijah Wood, about a Vietnam veteran's struggle with PTSD, and Up Close & Personal (1996), written by Joan Didion and John Gregory Dunne and loosely based on the life of newscaster Jessica Savitch, starring Robert Redford and Michelle Pfeiffer and featuring Joe Mategna, Stockard Channing, Kate Nelligan, and Glenn Plummer. The film's theme song, "Because You Loved Me," reached number one on the U.S. charts and won a Grammy Award; Avnet served as an executive producer on the recording.

He then directed and produced Red Corner (1997), starring Richard Gere, a political thriller examining the Chinese judicial system. The film's release drew public attention partly due to Gere's advocacy for Tibet. Gere and Avnet received the National Film Board of Review's First Amendment Award and Avnet received the ACLU's Bill of Rights Award. In 1999, Avnet co-founded GoCoverage.com with Steve Tisch and Howard Baldwin, the site soon collapsed.

Avnet produced Rodrigo Garcia's directorial debut, Things You Can Tell Just by Looking at Her (2000), after mentoring Garcia at the Sundance Directing Lab. The film, which features Glenn Close, Holly Hunter, Cameron Diaz, and Calista Flockhardt, premiered at Sundance and won the Un Certain Regard Award at Cannes. Avnet also executive produced David Frankel's first film as a director, Miami Rhapsody (1995).

=== Later films ===
Avnet spent several years developing a screenplay with frequent collaborator Paul Brickman based on Leon Uris's novel Mila 18. The resulting film, retitled Uprising (2001), is inspired by the historical record of Jewish resistance during the Holocaust. Because of the production timeline required by Uprising, Avnet withdrew from an earlier project he had been developing, Friday Night Lights. Uprising, starring Leelee Sobieski, Hank Azaria, David Schwimmer, and Jon Voight, was shot on a recreation of the Warsaw Ghetto constructed in Bratislava, Slovakia. Avnet received a DGA Award nomination for his direction; the film received four Emmy nominations, winning for Outstanding Stunt Coordination, and Sobieski and Azaria received acting nominations from the Golden Globes and the Broadcast Film Critics Association, respectively. Avnet and Kerner broke their partnership, leading Avnet to eventually launch Brooklyn Films in 2001 as he wanted a desire to focus on eclectic and adult fare.

Avnet produced Kerry Conran's Sky Captain and the World of Tomorrow (2004) for Paramount, an early large-scale example of a film shot entirely with blue screen backdrops. All the sets were put in after the shooting. Other producing credits, many alongside Jordan Kerner, include Less Than Zero (1987), When a Man Loves a Woman (1994), Miami Rhapsody (1995), George of the Jungle (1997), the Mighty Ducks film series, and Inspector Gadget (1999).

As a director, Avnet later made 88 Minutes (2007), starring Al Pacino, and Righteous Kill (2008), starring Robert De Niro and Al Pacino. He also directed and co-wrote Three Christs (2017), based on psychologist Milton Rokeach's 1959 case study of three patients with schizophrenia who each believed themselves to be Jesus Christ, featuring Richard Gere, Peter Dinklage, Walton Goggins, Bradley Whitford, Jane Alexander and Charlotte Hope. The film premiered at the Toronto International Film Festival and was released theatrically in 2020.

His most recent film, The Last Rodeo (2025), which he directed, co-wrote, and produced, is a father-daughter story set in the world of bull riding, starring Neal McDonough, Mykelti Williamson, Sarah Jones, Christopher McDonald, and Irene Bedard. Shot in Oklahoma and Texas, it opened in roughly 2,000 theaters on May 23, 2025, and grossed about $15 million domestically. It screened at the USA Film Festival in Dallas in April 2025, where Avnet received a career achievement award.

Avnet was an executive producer on Black Swan (2010), directed by Darren Aronofsky and starring Natalie Portman, which received five Academy Award nominations, including Best Picture, and numerous guild and critics' awards, including Portman's Academy Award for Best Actress.

=== Television ===
Avnet was an executive producer of NBC's Boomtown (2002–2003), for Steven Spielberg's Amblin Television, directing the pilot and several additional episodes. The series won the Television Critics Association Award for Outstanding New Program and a Peabody Award. It stars Donnie Wahlberg, Mykelti Williamson, and Neal McDonough, actors with whom Avnet has continued to collaborate.

He directed and executive-produced the USA Network limited series The Starter Wife (2007), based on the novel by Gigi Levangie Grazer and filmed in Australia, starring Debra Messing and Judy Davis, who won an Emmy for the role. The series received ten Emmy nominations and DGA and PGA nominations for Avnet.

With writer-producer Graham Yost, Avnet directed 10 episodes of FX's Justified (2010–2015), which received a Peabody Award and an Emmy win for Margo Martindale. Avnet again collaborated with Graham Yost on Amazon's Sneaky Pete, on which he later became an executive producer. Avnet collaborated once more with Graham Yost, directing multiple episodes of Justified: City Primeval. During the time, in 2012, Jon and his son Jake, along with Rodrigo Garcia, launched the web production company WIGS, and in 2014, the WIGS creative team launched its production company Indigenous Media, with funding from ITV and WPP.

Earlier television producing credits, several with Cicely Tyson, include Alex Haley's Mama Flora's Family (1998) and Heat Wave (1990), the latter about the Watts riots and based on reporting by journalist Bob Richardson; both received Cable ACE Awards, and co-star James Earl Jones won a Cable ACE Award and an Emmy for Heat Wave.

=== Theater ===
On Broadway, Avnet has produced shows with Bill Haber that have collectively received 35 Tony nominations and 12 Tony Awards, including the Tony-winning productions Monty Python's Spamalot and The History Boys. Other Broadway producing credits include The Pillowman, a revival of Inherit the Wind starring Christopher Plummer and Brian Dennehy, Conor McPherson's The Seafarer, and the Mike Nichols–directed revival of Clifford Odets's The Country Girl, starring Morgan Freeman and Frances McDormand.

=== Guild leadership ===
Avnet has chaired the Directors Guild of America's negotiating committee in its contract talks with the Alliance of Motion Picture and Television Producers on multiple occasions, including in 2020, 2023, and 2026. The 2023 agreement included provisions addressing artificial intelligence, which Avnet has described as the first such protections secured by a U.S. entertainment union; it led to the formation of a DGA committee on AI, which Avnet co-chairs with director Christopher Nolan. He also serves on the DGA's national board, its Western Directors Council, and its Pension and Health Plan committee.

== Other activities ==
Avnet has described interviewing Nelson Mandela at length, both during Mandela's imprisonment at Pollsmoor and after his release, as well as other figures associated with the African National Congress, including Walter Sisulu, Oliver Tambo, Thabo Mbeki, and Cyril Ramaphosa.

Avnet was an early producer attached to Martin Scorsese's The Last Temptation of Christ, which was shut down shortly before production at Paramount amid public controversy.

While researching Uprising, Avnet interviewed more than 200 Holocaust survivors, including Vladka Meed and Simcha Rotem, and consulted with historians including Michael Berenbaum, then of the United States Holocaust Memorial Museum, and Israel Gutman of Yad Vashem. He has since lectured on Holocaust resistance at universities internationally.

Avnet is vice chairman of the AFI Board of Trustees, on which he has served for more than 30 years, including eight as chairman, and has served on the University of Pennsylvania's School of Arts and Sciences Board of Advisors for 17 years. He has mentored at the Sundance Directing Lab and its French counterpart, Emergence.

== Awards and honors ==
Avnet received an honorary doctorate in communications from the American Film Institute in 2013 and the University of Pennsylvania's Creative Spirit Award in 2016, along with the AFI's Franklin J. Schaffner Achievement Award. For Red Corner, he received the ACLU's Bill of Rights Award and the National Board of Review's Freedom of Expression Award. He received a GLAAD Media Award for Outstanding Film for Fried Green Tomatoes.

== Personal life ==
Avnet has been married to the artist Barbara Brody since 1975. They have three children, Alexandra Avnet Costantino, Jacob Avnet, and Lily Avnet; and six grandchildren.

== Filmography ==
Year	Title	Director	Producer	Writer
1983	Risky Business	No	Yes	No
1983	Deal of the Century	No	Yes	No
1987	Less than Zero	No	Yes	No
1990	Men Don't Leave	No	Yes	No
1991	Fried Green Tomatoes	Yes	Yes	No
1992	The Mighty Ducks	No	Yes	No
1993	The Three Musketeers	No	Yes	No
1994	D2: The Mighty Ducks	No	Yes	No
1994	The War	Yes	Yes	No
1994	When a Man Loves a Woman	No	Yes	No
1995	Miami Rhapsody	No	Yes	No
1996	Up Close & Personal	Yes	Yes	No
1996	D3: The Mighty Ducks	No	Yes	No
1997	Red Corner	Yes	Yes	No
1997	George of the Jungle	No	Yes	No
1999	Inspector Gadget	No	Yes	No
2000	Things You Can Tell Just by Looking at Her	No	Yes	No
2000	Steal This Movie	No	Yes	No
2004	Sky Captain and the World of Tomorrow	No	Yes	No
2006	Land of the Blind	No	Yes	No
2007	88 Minutes	Yes	Yes	No
2008	Righteous Kill	Yes	No	No
2010	Black Swan	No	Yes	No
2017	Three Christs	Yes	Yes	Yes
2020	Four Good Days	No	Yes	No
2025	The Last Rodeo	Yes	Yes	Yes

=== Television ===
==== As director ====
- Call to Glory (1984–1985 TV series)
- The Burning Bed (1984)
- Between Two Women (1986)
- Naomi & Wynonna: Love Can Build a Bridge (1995)
- Mama Flora's Family (1998)
- Uprising (2001)
- Boomtown (2002–2003 TV series)
- The Starter Wife (miniseries) (2007 miniseries)
- Justified (2010–2015 TV series)
- Have a Little Faith (2011)
- Sneaky Pete (2018-2019 TV series)

==== As producer only ====
- No Other Love (1979)
- Something So Right (1982)
- In Love and War (1987)
- My First Love (1988)
- Side by Side (1988)
- Do You Know the Muffin Man? (1989)
- Breaking Point (1989)
- Prime Suspect (1991)
- Backfield in Motion (1991)
- The Watchman (1992)
- The Switch (1993)
- Poodle Springs (1998)
- My Last Love (1999)
- A House Divided (2000)
- Conviction (2005)
- Sixty Minute Man (2006)
- Bunker Hill (2009)
- Pleading Guilty (2010)
- Manhunt (2020 TV series)
- Justified: City Primeval (2023)

=== Broadway Plays ===
- Spamalot (2004)
- The Pillowman (2005)
- The History Boys (2006)
- The Seafarer (2007)
- The Country Girl (2008)
