= Colombe Jacobsen-Derstine =

American chef and actress (born 1977)

- Born: December 21, 1977 (age 48); Chicago, Illinois, U.S.
- Other name: Colombe Jacobsen
- Education: Sarah Lawrence College
- Occupations: Chef, actress
- Years active: 1992–1996, 2002–2003, 2007, 2014
- Children: 2
- Website: www.colombedujour.com

Colombe Jacobsen-Derstine (born December 21, 1977) is an American chef and actress. She attended the Natural Gourmet School in New York City, and competed in the 2007 season of The Next Food Network Star. She currently hosts Colombe du jour, her own food-related website and blog.

As an actress, she is best known for her child roles, including Julie "The Cat" Gaffney in the film series The Mighty Ducks.

== Biography ==
Born in Chicago, Jacobsen-Derstine began her career as a child actor, making her film debut in 1993. The following year, she was cast as a hockey player in D2: The Mighty Ducks. In 1996, she played the same role in D3: The Mighty Ducks. Following an extended acting break, she attended the Natural Gourmet School in New York, where she graduated in 2004. During her culinary training, she worked as an actress in the films Men in Black II, Moonlight Mile, and Searching for Haizmann. Prior to the Natural Gourmet School, Jacobsen attended Sarah Lawrence College, where she graduated in 2000.

== Filmography ==
Year	Title	Role	Notes
1993	Rookie of the Year	Becky Fraker	
1994	D2: The Mighty Ducks	Julie "The Cat" Gaffney	
1996	D3: The Mighty Ducks	Julie "The Cat" Gaffney	
2002	Men in Black II	Hailey (video store clerk)	
2002	Moonlight Mile	Patty	
2003	Searching for Haizmann	Hannah Allen	
2007	Descent	Nadia	
2007	The Living Wake	Prostitute	
2014	Chef	Lisa	Uncredited
