= Heat Wave (1990 film) =

- Genre: Drama; History
- Written by: Michael Lazarou
- Directed by: Kevin Hooks
- Starring: Cicely Tyson; Blair Underwood; James Earl Jones; Margaret Avery; David Strathairn; Glenn Plummer; Vondie Curtis-Hall; Paris Vaughan; Sally Kirkland
- Music by: Thomas Newman
- Country of origin: United States
- Original language: English

Production
- Executive producers: Jon Avnet; Jordan Kerner; Steve Golin; Sigurjón Sighvatsson
- Producers: Jon Avnet; Jordan Kerner
- Production locations: Beverly Hills; South Central Los Angeles
- Cinematography: Mark Irwin
- Editor: Debra Neil
- Running time: 92 minutes
- Production companies: Propaganda Films; Avnet/Kerner Productions; The Kerner Entertainment Company

Original release
- Network: TNT
- Release: August 13, 1990

Heat Wave is a 1990 American thriller-drama television film about the 1965 Los Angeles Watts Riots, directed by Kevin Hooks and starring Blair Underwood, Cicely Tyson, James Earl Jones, Margaret Avery, and David Strathairn.

== Cast ==
- Blair Underwood as Robert Richardson
- Cicely Tyson as Ruthana Richardson
- James Earl Jones as Junius Johnson
- Margaret Avery as Roxie Turpin
- David Strathairn as Bill Thomas
- Glenn Plummer as J.T. Turpin
- Vondie Curtis-Hall as Clifford Turpin
- Paris Vaughan as Lada
- Adam Arkin as Art Berman
- Charlie Korsmo as 12-year-old Jason
- Sally Kirkland as Mrs. Canfield
- Mark Rolston as Officer Zekanis
- Robert Hooks as Reverend Brooks
- T.E. Russell as Dominique Freeman

== Awards and nominations ==
CableACE Awards

- Actress in a Movie or Miniseries – Cicely Tyson – won
- Editing a Dramatic or Theatrical Special/Movie or Miniseries – Debra Neil – won
- Movie or Miniseries – Jon Avnet, Jordan Kerner, Steve Golin, and Sigurjón Sighvatsson – won
- Supporting Actor in a Movie or Miniseries – James Earl Jones – won
- Directing a Movie or Miniseries – Kevin Hooks – nominated

Emmy Award

- Outstanding Supporting Actor in a Miniseries or a Special – James Earl Jones – won

Writers Guild of America

- Original Long Form – Michael Lazarou – nominated
