= Elden Henson =

American actor

- Henson in 2026
- Born: Elden Ryan Ratliff; August 30, 1977 (age 49); Rockville, Maryland, U.S.
- Other names: Elden Ratliff; Elden Ryan Ratliff
- Occupation: Actor
- Years active: 1982–present
- Spouses: Amy Getman (m. 1999; div. 2014) Kira Sternbach (m. 2014; div. 2017)
- Children: 1
- Relatives: Garette Ratliff Henson (brother); Ellington Ratliff (half-brother)

Elden Henson (born Elden Ryan Ratliff, August 30, 1977) is an American actor. He is best known for playing Fulton Reed in The Mighty Ducks trilogy (1992–1996), Foggy Nelson in the Marvel Cinematic Universe (2015–2026), and Pollux in The Hunger Games: Mockingjay - Part 1 (2014) and Part 2 (2015).

== Early life ==
Elden Ryan Ratliff was born August 30, 1977, in Rockville, Maryland, to Sayde Henson, an educator and former photographer, and George Ratliff, a former New York theater actor. He has two brothers, actors Garette Ratliff Henson (who appeared in The Mighty Ducks with Elden) and Erick Ratliff (who, like Elden, appeared in Elvis and Me). From his father's second marriage, he has a younger half-brother, Ellington Ratliff, who is a member of the band R5.

Henson grew up in Burbank, California. A child actor, he started acting in commercials at age six and booked a series of film and television roles by age ten. Henson attended John Burroughs High School in Burbank, after which he briefly attended Emerson College.

== Career ==
Henson's first professional work was as a print model when he was a toddler. During this time, he was signed to the children's division of Fords Models. By age six, he was acting in commercials. He received his SAG card in 1982. Over the following decade, he acted in films including 1988's Elvis and Me and 1989's Turner & Hooch, and had a series of guest roles on television.

From 1992 to 1996, Henson played Fulton Reed in all three films in The Mighty Ducks trilogy: The Mighty Ducks (1992), D2: The Mighty Ducks (1994) and D3: The Mighty Ducks (1996). He told TV Guide that he owes "a lot of [his] career" to those films. "What's funny is I still, more than anything, get recognized for The Mighty Ducks. I love it. When I was younger, I would get embarrassed. I played sports growing up and I'd be playing baseball and the other team would be quacking at me and stuff. I love those movies. I feel like these things come once in a lifetime and to experience this stuff as a kid and as an adult, I just feel really lucky."

In his early twenties, he had supporting roles in films like The Mighty, She's All That, Idle Hands, O, Dumb and Dumberer: When Harry Met Lloyd, and The Butterfly Effect. He had starring roles in the 1999 TV movie Gift of Love: The Daniel Huffman Story and the 2003 film The Battle of Shaker Heights. During this time, Henson also ran a film production company, Roulette Entertainment, with fellow actor Josh Hartnett. In the late 2000s, he appeared in movies including Lords of Dogtown and Deja Vu, and also made guest appearances on a variety of television shows, including a four-episode arc on the CBS series Smith.

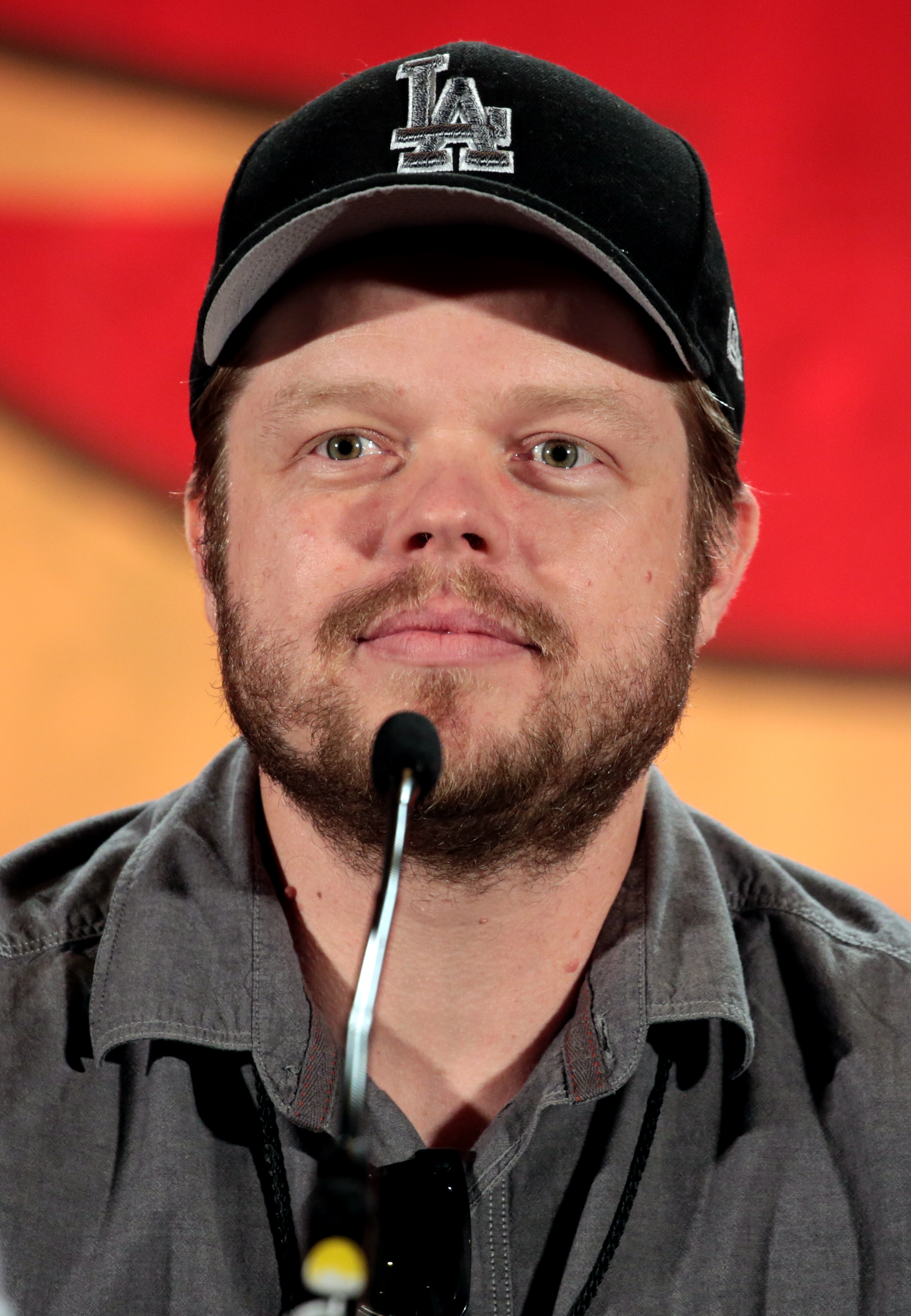
Henson in 2017

Henson portrayed Apple Computer engineer Andy Hertzfeld in the 2013 biopic Jobs. In September 2013, it was announced that he had been cast as Pollux in The Hunger Games: Mockingjay Parts 1 and 2. Principal photography began that same month in Atlanta, and concluded on June 20, 2014, in Berlin, Germany; the two parts were filmed back-to-back.

Beginning in 2015, Henson portrayed Foggy Nelson in all three seasons of the Netflix television series Daredevil. Marvel announced Henson's casting in June 2014. During the audition for the role of Foggy Nelson, which was held via video conference call, Henson held his phone the wrong way and appeared upside down to others in the meeting. This mishap convinced the show's executives he was the right man for the part. Henson spoke of his excitement for Foggy's role in the series, saying "I was really excited as I was getting the scripts and reading that Foggy wasn't just a useless sidekick. He's not just comic relief. I mean, he is some of those things. He does have comic relief, but it was exciting to know that these other characters would have their own path and their own things that they're dealing with." In addition to Daredevil, Henson has also portrayed Foggy in the crossover miniseries The Defenders and a cameo appearance in the second seasons of Jessica Jones and Luke Cage. Henson reprised his role for the Disney+ Daredevil revival series, Daredevil: Born Again.

== Personal life ==
Henson lives in Los Angeles. He has one son with former wife Kira Sternbach.

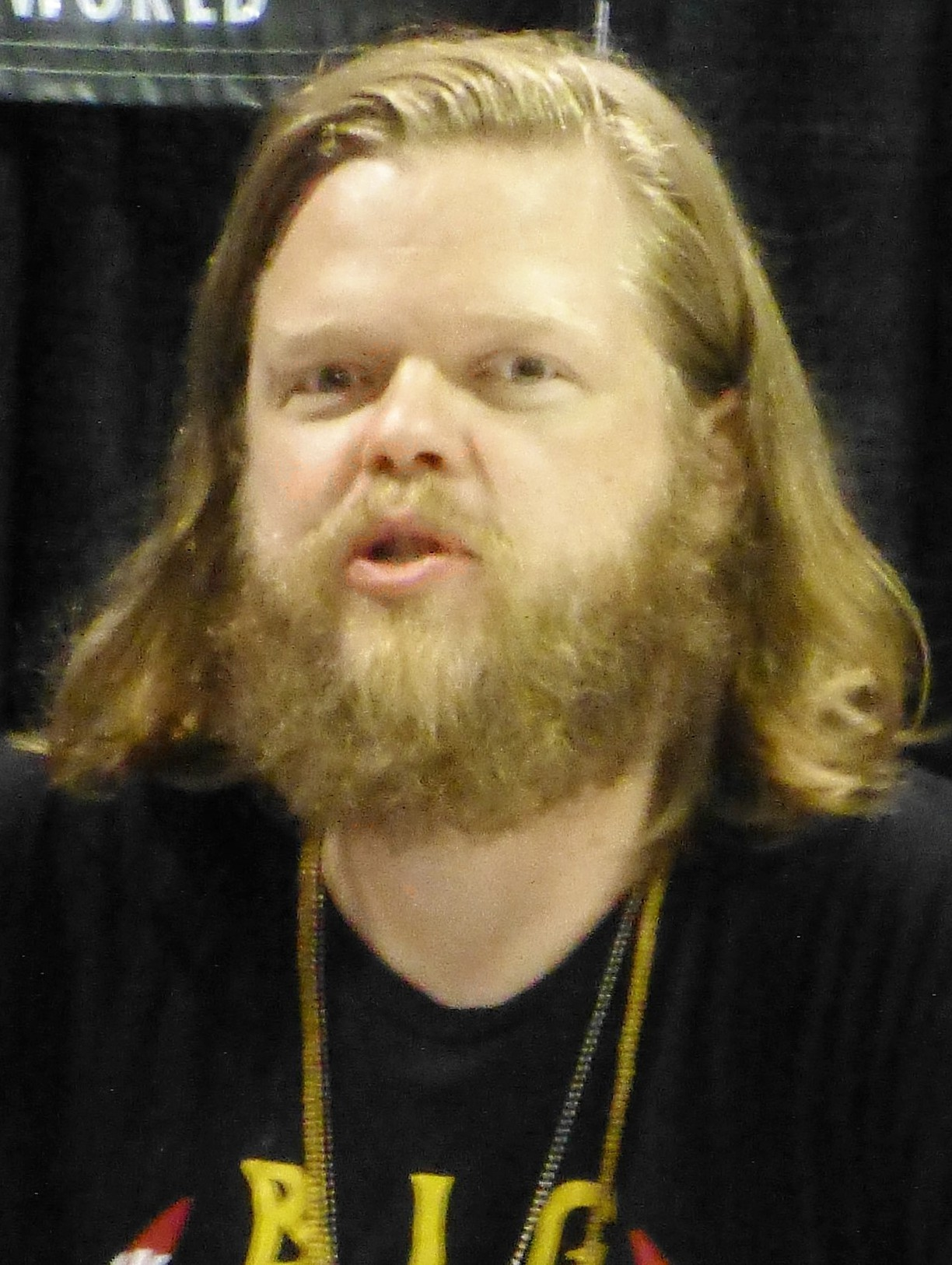
Henson in Chicago in 2016

== Filmography ==
=== Films ===
Year	Title	Role	Notes
1987	Jaws: The Revenge	Additional Voices	Credited as Elden Ratliff
1988	Elvis and Me	Don Beaulieu (age 10)	Credited as Elden Ratliff
1989	Turner & Hooch	Eric Boyett	Credited as Elden Ratliff
1990	Marilyn Hotchkiss Ballroom Dancing & Charm School	Steve Mills	Short film; credited as Elden Ratliff
1992	Radio Flyer	Fisher Friend #3	Credited as Elden Ratliff
1992	The Mighty Ducks	Fulton Reed	Credited as Elden Ratliff
1994	D2: The Mighty Ducks	Fulton Reed	Credited as Elden Ratliff
1996	Foxfire	Bobby	Credited as Elden Ratliff
1996	D3: The Mighty Ducks	Fulton Reed	Credited as Elden Ryan Ratliff
1998	The Mighty	Maxwell Kane	
1999	She's All That	Jesse Jackson	
1999	Idle Hands	Pnub	
1999	A Gift of Love: The Daniel Huffman Story	Daniel Huffman	
2000	Cast Away	Elden Madden	
2001	Manic	Michael	
2001	O	Roger Rodriguez	
2002	Pack of Dogs	Sheep	Short film
2002	Cheats	Sammy Green	
2003	Dumb and Dumberer: When Harry Met Lloyd	Turk	
2003	The Battle of Shaker Heights	Bart Bowland	
2003	Under the Tuscan Sun	Author	
2003	Evil Alien Conquerors	Ron	
2004	The Butterfly Effect	Lenny Kagan (Adult)	
2005	Marilyn Hotchkiss Ballroom Dancing & Charm School	Young Steve Mills/Sampson	Included his earlier film in flashbacks
2005	The Amateurs	Salesman	Originally titled The Moguls
2005	Lords of Dogtown	Billy Z	
2006	Déjà Vu	Gunnars	
2007	Rise: Blood Hunter	Taylor	
2008	Not Since You	Joey "Fudge" Fudgler	
2011	The Death and Return of Superman	Doomsday	Short film
2013	Jobs	Andy Hertzfeld	
2014	The Hunger Games: Mockingjay – Part 1	Pollux	
2015	The Hunger Games: Mockingjay – Part 2	Pollux	
2018	Spivak	Kevin Oberkfell	
2023	Killers of the Flower Moon	Duke Burkhart	

=== Television ===
Year	Title	Role	Notes
1982–1985	As the World Turns	Paul Ryan	2 episodes; credited as Elden Ratliff
1984	1st & Ten		1 episode
1985	Amazing Stories	Freckle-Faced Boy	Episode: "Mummy Daddy"; credited as Elden Ratliff
1986	Fame	Matthew	Episode: "All I Want for Christmas"; credited as Elden Ratliff
1987	What a Country!	Boy	Episode: "Taylor Loses His Cool"; credited as Elden Ratliff
1987	Highway To Heaven	Alan Bailey	Episode: "I Was a Middle Aged Werewolf"; credited as Elden Ratliff
1993	Saved By The Bell: The New Class	Dirk	Episode: "Karate Kids"; credited as Elden Ryan Ratliff
1993	The Ben Stiller Show	Cub Scout	Episode: "A Few Good Scouts"; Uncredited role
2004	Law & Order: Special Victims Unit	Will Caray	Episode: "Brotherhood"
2007	Smith	Matthew Marley	4 episodes
2007	ER	Fingerless Guy	Episode: "The War Comes Home"
2007	Private Practice	Damon	Episode: "In Which Sam Gets Taken for a Ride"
2009	Psych	Clive	Episode: "Tuesday the 17th"
2009	Grey's Anatomy	Matt	Episode: "Sweet Surrender"
2010	El Dorado	Gordon	Main role; miniseries
2014	Intelligence	Amos Pembroke	2 episodes
2015–2018	Daredevil	Franklin "Foggy" Nelson	Main cast; 38 episodes
2017	Workaholics	Nipples	Episode: "Tactona 420"
2017	The Defenders	Franklin "Foggy" Nelson	Main cast; 5 episodes
2018	Jessica Jones	Franklin "Foggy" Nelson	Episode: "AKA Sole Survivor"
2018	Luke Cage	Franklin "Foggy" Nelson	Episode: "All Souled Out"
2021–2022	The Mighty Ducks: Game Changers	Fulton Reed	Episodes: "Spirit of the Ducks" and "Ice Breaker"
2025–2026	Daredevil: Born Again	Franklin "Foggy" Nelson	Episodes: "Heaven's Half Hour" and "The Grand Design"
2025	Criminal Minds: Evolution	Clyde Smets	Episode: "The Zookeeper"
2026	Chicago Med	Lucas Charles	Episode: "Altered States"
