= Naomi & Wynonna: Love Can Build a Bridge =

- Genre: Biography; Drama; Music
- Written by: Rama Laurie Stagner
- Directed by: Bobby Roth
- Starring: Kathleen York; Viveka Davis; Bruce Greenwood; Elisabeth Moss
- Music by: J.A.C. Redford
- Country of origin: United States
- Original language: English

Production
- Executive producers: Jon Avnet; Naomi Judd; Jordan Kerner
- Producer: Salli Newman
- Cinematography: Shelly Johnson
- Editor: Henk Van Eeghen
- Running time: 188 minutes
- Production company: The Avnet/Kerner Company

Original release
- Network: NBC
- Release: May 14 – May 15, 1995

Naomi & Wynonna: Love Can Build a Bridge is a 1995 American made-for-television biographical film about the mother-daughter country music duo The Judds, directed by Bobby Roth. It was originally broadcast in two parts by NBC on May 14–15, 1995.

== Plot ==
Kathleen York stars as Naomi Judd (then known as Diana Judd) a single mother of two daughters, who turned to music as way to help positively influence her increasingly belligerent and rebellious eldest daughter Wynonna, (then known as Christina). The movie chronicles Naomi's struggle to provide for her daughters (the youngest of whom grew up to become actress Ashley Judd, who narrates the film), the singing duo's rise from Nashville fame to national celebrity, the ups and downs that accompanied a working family relationship, and Naomi's eventual retirement from the music business. The movie was based on Naomi's autobiography Love Can Build A Bridge.

== Reception ==
Variety described this production as "above average for the genre, with a lot of good music in addition to the expected hard times and heartaches." Entertainment Weekly called it "mostly misguided" but nevertheless thought that "the stars fit the bill to perfection" and gave particular credit to the work of casting executive Molly Lopata. Joyce Millman of the San Francisco Examiner praised the "surprisingly perceptive and hugely entertaining NBC miniseries" and its lead performers' "fearless, intelligent performances as determined, stubborn women who remain admirable even when they're unlovable."

== See also ==
- List of American films of 1995
