= Ty O'Neal =

American actor

- Born: Ty O'Neal McClary; August 2, 1978 (age 48); Abilene, Texas, U.S.
- Occupation: Actor
- Spouse: Christie McClary (m. 2005)

Ty O'Neal McClary (born August 2, 1978) is an American actor.

== Career ==
He is best known for playing the ice-skating cowboy Dwayne Robertson in D2: The Mighty Ducks and D3: The Mighty Ducks. McClary became close with Kenan Thompson while working on the films. The two lived together for a while during filming. In 2001 he portrayed real-life outlaw Clell Miller in American Outlaws alongside Colin Farrell, Scott Caan, and Gabriel Macht.

Today, O'Neal is a member of the Professional Rodeo Cowboys Association (PRCA). His events are team roping, tie-down roping, and steer wrestling. Ty also frequently hosts for Western Sports Round-Up, a rodeo centric sports show for the Cowboy Channel. He also is a main anchor for the Cowboy Channel and does many more TV broadcasting for them.

He has appeared in a frequently played Holiday Inn commercial as a bull rider.

== Personal life ==
O'Neal married his wife Christie in 2005. Christie McClary is also a rodeo cowgirl who had previously modeled in woman's western wear catalogs. The couple moved to North Texas, where they raise and train quarter horses. Occasionally, they travel on the PRCA rodeo circuit, of which O'Neal is a member. McClary also has a daughter, that also rodeos and does events such as Breakaway. She is also a Model.

== Filmography ==
Film
Year	Film	Role	Other notes
1994	D2: The Mighty Ducks	Dwayne Robertson	
1996	D3: The Mighty Ducks	Dwayne Robertson	
1997	Blood Trail	Juble Fletcher	Direct-to-Video Release
1997	The Postman	Drew	
1998	Big Buster	Deputy Bo	Alternative title: Some Things Never Die
1999	Wild Wild West	Living Portrait	Uncredited Role
2001	American Outlaws	Clell Miller	
Television
Year	Title	Role	Notes
1999	The Magnificent Seven	Matthew Nichols	Episode: Vendetta
2004	Tiger Cruise	Danny Horner	TV-Movie
2021	Western Sport Round-Up	Co-Host	Rodeo Sports show
