= Scott Whyte =

American actor

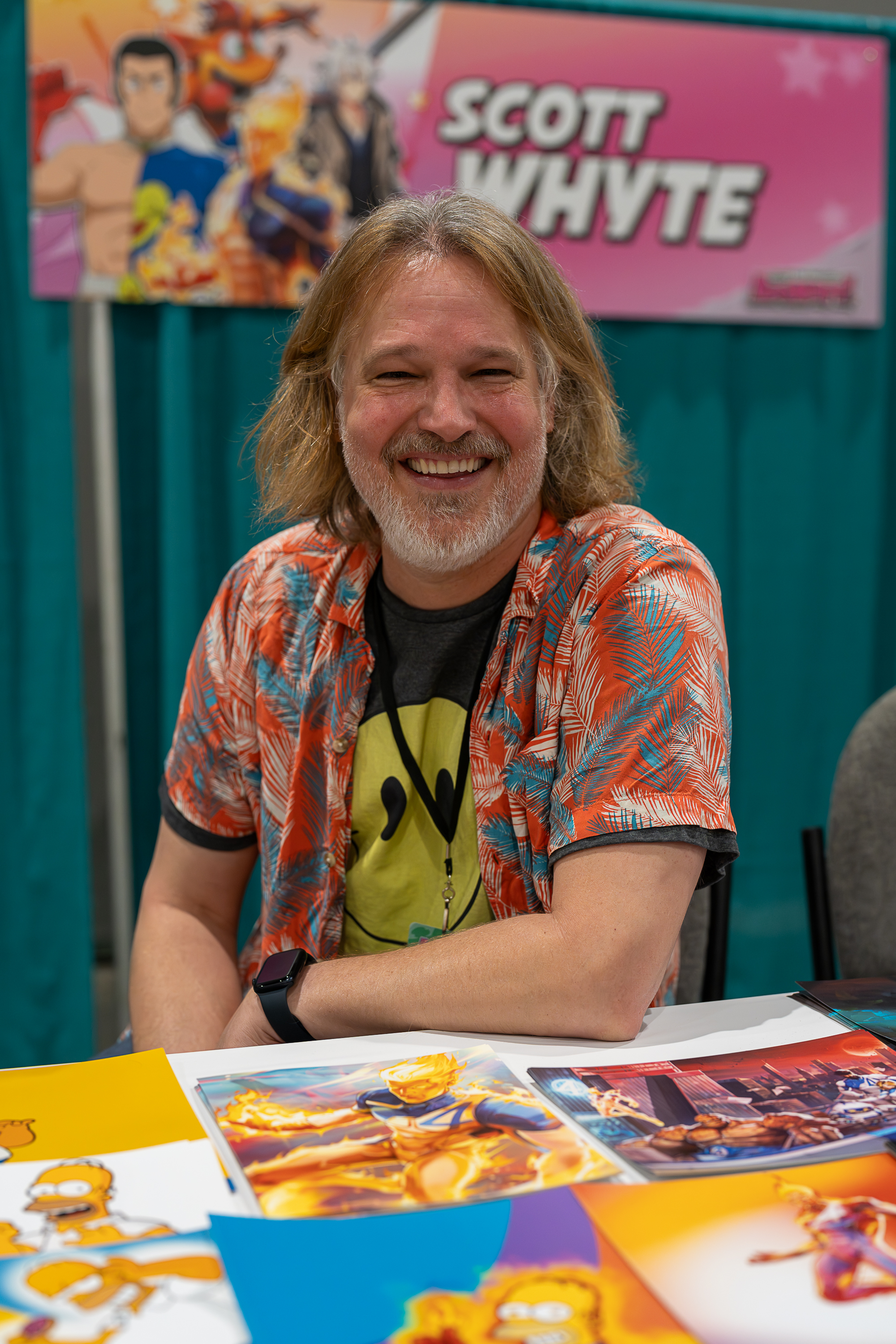
- Whyte at Animate! Raleigh in 2026
- Born: Manhattan Beach, California, U.S
- Occupation: Actor
- Years active: 1988–present
- Spouse: Chantelle Barry (m. 2018)

Scott Whyte is an American actor, best known for his role as Chris Anderson on City Guys. He has also appeared in television series such as That '70s Show and Just Shoot Me! and the films D2: The Mighty Ducks and its sequel, D3, as different characters.

== Early life ==
Whyte was born in Manhattan Beach, California.

== Career ==
Whyte made his film debut in the Mel Gibson/Kurt Russell feature Tequila Sunrise as a background character, having been cast after going to watch filming, as he lived near the shooting location. He and his brother were also cast as background characters in Over the Top after going to watch filming.

He landed his first part at the age of 13, appearing in a commercial for Pop Tarts, and later appeared in the television series That '70s Show, Just Shoot Me!, The Nanny, Full House and NBC's City Guys, along with hosting the television series Chicken Soup for the Soul, based on the best selling books.

In 1994, he was cast as Gunnar Stahl in D2: The Mighty Ducks and would later play Scott Holland in the 1996 sequel. He originally auditioned for the role of Dean Portman, but it was given to Aaron Lohr instead.

Since 2007, Whyte has worked extensively as a voice actor in various animated films, television shows and video games. His first voice-over job was voicing Homer Simpson in the 2007 mobile game The Simpsons: Minutes to Meltdown. His other voice credits include Mr. Graham in Mighty No. 9, Leonardo in Teenage Mutant Ninja Turtles: Out of the Shadows and has provided voices in various other video game titles including Infamous Second Son Batman: Arkham Knight, Mad Max, Transformers: Devastation, Skylanders: SuperChargers and Counter-Strike: Global Offensive.

In 2020, Whyte became the new voice of Crash Bandicoot in Crash Bandicoot 4: It's About Time, replacing Jess Harnell. In 2021, he also became the new voice of Captain Qwark in Ratchet & Clank: Rift Apart, replacing Jim Ward.

== Personal life ==
Whyte has been married to Australian musician and actress Chantelle Barry, since December 2018.

== Filmography ==
=== Film ===
| Year | Title | Role | Notes |
|---|---|---|---|
| 1988 | Tequila Sunrise | Boy at Party | Uncredited |
| 1994 | D2: The Mighty Ducks | Gunnar Stahl | |
| 1996 | D3: The Mighty Ducks | Scott "Scooter" Holland | |
| 2005 | Reeker | Trip | |
| 2005 | The Fallen Ones | Mickey | |
| 2007 | Ghosts of Goldfield | Dean | Direct-to-video |
| 2008 | Stiletto | Officer Stone | Direct-to-video |
| 2009 | Dark House | Moreton | |
| 2012 | Wyatt Earp's Revenge | Charlie Bassett | Direct-to-video |
| 2012 | Wings | Red Tractor, Rinaldo | Voice |
| 2014 | Someone Marry Barry | Angry Man in Audience | |
| 2015 | Faith of Our Fathers | Edward "Eddie" Adams | |
| 2016 | The Land Before Time XIV: Journey of the Brave | Bron | Voice, direct-to-video |
| 2019 | Missing Link | New Worlder | Voice |
| 2022 | Chip 'n Dale: Rescue Rangers | Bull Co-Worker | Voice |
| 2024 | Ryan's World the Movie: Titan Universe Adventure | Dark Titan, Packrat | Voice |

=== Television ===
| Year | Title | Role | Notes |
|---|---|---|---|
| 1994 | Full House | Jason | Episode: "Stephanie's Wild Ride" |
| 1995 | The Nanny | Sean | Episode: "A Kiss Is Just a Kiss" |
| 1997 | Hang Time | Joey | Episode: "Fighting Words" |
| 1997–2001 | City Guys | Chris Anderson | 105 episodes |
| 1999 | That '70s Show | David Milbank | Episode: "A New Hope" |
| 2000 | Malibu, CA | Ned | Episode: "Big Daddy" |
| 2002 | Just Shoot Me! | Rob | Episode: "Friends and Neighbors" |
| 2006 | Voodoo Moon | Billy | Television film |
| 2007 | All of Us | James | Episode: "Sins of the Father" |
| 2008–13 | The Garfield Show | Additional Voices | 5 episodes |
| 2011 | Jimmy Kimmel Live! | Announcer | Voice, 1 episode |
| 2013 | Mad | Spock, Hawkeye | Voice, episode: "Star Blecch Into Dumbness/Stark Tank" |
| 2015 | Eye Candy | Hunter | 9 episodes |
| 2015 | Nicky, Ricky, Dicky & Dawn | DJ | Voice, episode: "I Want Candace" |
| 2015 | Doc McStuffins | Chaz | Voice, episode: "Twin Tweaks" |
| 2016–17 | Rolling with the Ronks! | Walter | Voice, 52 episodes |
| 2017 | The Inspectors | Joel | Episode: "Surveillance 101" |
| 2018 | Adam Ruins Everything | Additional voices | Episode: "Reanimated History: The First Factsgiving" |
| 2019 | Love, Death & Robots | Jake, Simon, Future Nazi, Trot | Voice, 4 episodes |
| 2019 | Alternatino with Arturo Castro | Wise Owl | Voice, episode: "The Neighbor" |
| 2019 | Carmen Sandiego | Otter Man | Episode: "The Stockholm Syndrome Caper" |
| 2019–20 | Power Players | Uncle Andrew, Porcupunk | Voice, recurring role |
| 2020 | Tower of God | Shibisu, Hyun Seoung, Leo Clocker | Voice, English dub |
| 2020 | American Dad! | Train Actor, additional voices | 2 episodes |
| 2020 | Miraculous: Tales of Ladybug & Cat Noir | Sparrow | Voice, episode: "Miraculous World: New York - United HeroeZ" |
| 2021 | Jellystone! | Country | Voice, episode: "Catanooga Cheese Explosion/Squish or Miss" |
| 2021 | Arcane | Additional voices | Episode: "Welcome to the Playground" |
| 2021–22 | Close Enough | Evan, additional voices | 5 episodes |
| 2026 | Jujutsu Kaisen | Fumihiko Takaba | Voice, English dub |
| 2026 | Beastars | Melon | Voice, English dub |
| 2026 | Star Wars: Maul – Shadow Lord | Dryden Vos | Voice, 2 episodes |

=== Video games ===
| Year | Title | Role | Notes |
|---|---|---|---|
| 2007 | The Simpsons: Minutes to Meltdown | Homer Simpson | Mobile game |
| 2010 | Transformers: War for Cybertron | Jazz | |
| 2010 | Crackdown 2 | Additional voices | |
| 2011 | Star Wars: The Old Republic | Brant Organa, Colony Security Officer, Lieutenant Torve, MP-77, Private Vekker, Sergeant Vandal, Kai Zykken | |
| 2012 | Diablo III | Additional voices | Also Reaper of Souls |
| 2012 | Counter-Strike: Global Offensive | Anarchists | |
| 2012 | Call of Duty: Black Ops II | Multiplayer | |
| 2012 | Overstrike | Additional voices | |
| 2013 | Warframe | 'Heron' Drifter & Operator | |
| 2013 | Fuse | Grigori, Scientist #2, Raven Guard | |
| 2013 | Teenage Mutant Ninja Turtles: Out of the Shadows | Leonardo | |
| 2013 | Call of Duty: Ghosts | Male Soldier #2 | Uncredited |
| 2013–16 | Skylanders series | Marshall Wheelock, Funny Bone | |
| 2014 | Infamous Second Son | Constable, Rebel #2, Rebel #4 | |
| 2014 | Transformers: Rise of the Dark Spark | Hardshell, Decepticon Schemer, Lockdown Soldier | |
| 2014 | Infamous First Light | Additional voices | |
| 2014 | The Sims 4 | Sim | |
| 2014 | Sunset Overdrive | Fizzie, Scab | |
| 2014 | Call of Duty: Advanced Warfare | Jackson, Additional voices | |
| 2015 | The Order: 1886 | Additional voices | |
| 2015 | Lego Jurassic World | Additional voices | |
| 2015 | Batman: Arkham Knight | Henchmen | |
| 2015 | Mad Max | Additional voices | |
| 2015 | Lego Dimensions | Additional voices | |
| 2015 | Transformers: Devastation | Starscream, Skywarp, Rumble | |
| 2015 | Halo 5: Guardians | Marine, Scientist | |
| 2015 | Star Wars Battlefront | Leema Kai | |
| 2015 | The Legend of Heroes: Trails of Cold Steel | Crow Armbrust | Credited as "Charger Tomlee" |
| 2016 | Lego Marvel's Avengers | Hulkling | |
| 2016 | Ratchet & Clank | Blarg Scientist, Don Wonderstar, Blargian Snagglebeast, Blarg #2 | |
| 2016 | Mighty No. 9 | Mr. Gregory Graham | |
| 2016 | Lego Star Wars: The Force Awakens | Additional voices | |
| 2016 | Titanfall 2 | Scientist | |
| 2016 | Final Fantasy XV | Additional voices | |
| 2016 | The Legend of Heroes: Trails of Cold Steel II | Crow Armbrust | Credited as "Charger Tomlee" |
| 2017 | Agents of Mayhem | Pride Trooper, Pride Technician | |
| 2018 | Far Cry 5 | Additional voices | |
| 2018 | Identity V | Orpheus | |
| 2018 | God of War | Additional voices | |
| 2018 | Lego The Incredibles | Additional voices | |
| 2018 | Spider-Man | Additional voices | |
| 2018 | Call of Duty: Black Ops 4 | Additional voices | |
| 2018 | Spyro Reignited Trilogy | Additional voices | |
| 2019 | Far Cry New Dawn | Additional voices | |
| 2019 | Fallout 76: Wild Appalachia | Scout Leader Jaggy, Scout Leader Pompy, Scout Leader Treadly | Wild Appalachia DLC |
| 2019 | Sekiro: Shadows Die Twice | Additional voices | |
| 2019 | Days Gone | Jessie "Carlos" Williamson, Jim Moore | |
| 2019 | Death Stranding | Jake Wind, Nick Easton | |
| 2019 | The Legend of Heroes: Trails of Cold Steel III | Crow Armbrust | Credited as "Charger Tomlee" |
| 2020 | Guardian Tales | God of Harvest Kamael | |
| 2020 | Final Fantasy VII Remake | Additional Voices | |
| 2020 | Clubhouse Games: 51 Worldwide Classics | Additional Voices | |
| 2020 | The Last of Us Part II | Additional Voices | |
| 2020 | Iron Man VR | S.H.I.E.L.D. Agent B, News Anchor #3 | |
| 2020 | Wasteland 3 | Wealthy Citizen, Nightclub Patron | |
| 2020 | Crash Bandicoot 4: It's About Time | Crash Bandicoot, Fake Crash | Replacing Jess Harnell. Including 100% epilogue narration. |
| 2020 | Spider-Man: Miles Morales | Additional voices | |
| 2020 | Call of Duty: Black Ops Cold War | Additional voices | |
| 2020 | Star Wars: Tales from the Galaxy's Edge | Additional voices | |
| 2020 | The Legend of Heroes: Trails of Cold Steel IV | Crow Armbrust | Credited as "Charger Tomlee" |
| 2021 | Ratchet & Clank: Rift Apart | Captain Qwark, Goons-4-Less, Robot Pirates, additional Voices | Replacing Jim Ward |
| 2021 | No More Heroes III | Mr. Blackhole, Native Dancer, President of the United States | |
| 2021 | Halo Infinite | Spartan Vettel | |
| 2022 | Lost Ark | Additional voices | |
| 2022 | Horizon Forbidden West | Additional voices | |
| 2022 | Triangle Strategy | Gustadolph Aesfrost | |
| 2022 | Escape Academy | Jeb Jebberson | |
| 2022 | Saints Row | Law Enforcement | |
| 2022 | Star Ocean: The Divine Force | Marquis Yzen | |
| 2023 | The Legend of Heroes: Trails into Reverie | Crow Armbrust | Credited under his real name |
| 2023 | Call of Duty: Modern Warfare II | Skeletor | |
| 2025 | Marvel Rivals | Johnny Storm/ Human Torch | |
| 2025 | Avowed | Marius | |
| 2026 | The Legend of Heroes: Trails Beyond the Horizon | Crow Armbrust | |

=== Web ===
| Year | Title | Role | Notes |
|---|---|---|---|
| 2017–18 | Freedom Fighters: The Ray | Blitzkrieg, Barry Allen / Flash | Voice, 7 episodes |
| 2026 | Cow Squad | Carrots | Voice, 8 episodes |
