= D2: The Mighty Ducks =

1994 film by Sam Weisman

- Theatrical release poster
- Directed by: Sam Weisman
- Written by: Steven Brill
- Based on: Characters by Steven Brill
- Produced by: Jon Avnet; Jordan Kerner
- Starring: Emilio Estevez; Michael Tucker; Jan Rubeš; Kathryn Erbe
- Cinematography: Mark Irwin
- Edited by: John F. Link; Eric Sears
- Music by: J. A. C. Redford
- Production companies: Walt Disney Pictures; Avnet-Kerner Productions
- Distributed by: Buena Vista Pictures Distribution
- Release date: March 25, 1994
- Running time: 106 minutes
- Country: United States
- Language: English
- Box office: $45.6 million

D2: The Mighty Ducks (also known as The Mighty Ducks 2) is a 1994 American family sports comedy-drama film directed by Sam Weisman. It is the second installment in the Mighty Ducks trilogy, and a sequel to the 1992 film The Mighty Ducks produced by Walt Disney Pictures, The Kerner Entertainment Company and Avnet–Kerner Productions. Emilio Estevez, Joshua Jackson, Elden Henson, Shaun Weiss, Brandon Adams, Matt Doherty, Garette Ratliff Henson, Marguerite Moreau, Vincent Larusso, Brock Pierce, Robert Hall, and Bob Miller reprise their roles in the film with Michael Tucker, Jan Rubeš and Kathryn Erbe joining the cast. Kenan Thompson appears in his first film role. It was followed by the final film of the series, D3: The Mighty Ducks, in 1996.

== Plot ==
Former Pee-Wee hockey coach Gordon Bombay is a star in the minor leagues, expected to reach the National Hockey League. However, a career-ending knee injury brings him back to the Blukeville (Note: A fictitious name for the fifth district created for the trilogy, just like how the Junior Goodwill Games, not to mention the Eden Hall Academy from D3: The Mighty Ducks (1996), were fictional.) district of Minneapolis. Bombay is offered a chance to coach a team representing the United States in the Junior Goodwill Games in Los Angeles. He manages to reunite most of his former Ducks players, including Charlie Conway, Jesse Hall, Lester Averman, Connie Moreau, Guy Germaine, Greg Goldberg, and Adam Banks while the Hawks see the former Ducks rollerblading in the park, and try to enact revenge for their humiliating loss two years earlier. Their plans are foiled by Fulton Reed, who leaves them tied up in their underpants, and joins the other Ducks. Team USA consists of many of the old Ducks, in addition to five new players from across the country, with special talents: Luis Mendoza, from Miami, Florida, a speedster, Dwayne Robertson, from Austin, Texas, an expert puck handler with a cowboy edge, Julie "The Cat" Gaffney, from Bangor, Maine, a championship Goalie, Kenny Wu, from San Francisco, California, a junior Olympic figure skater, and Dean Portman, from Chicago, Illinois, a tough enforcer. Under Bombay's coaching, the Ducks and their new teammates quickly become unified, and head out to L.A.

In Los Angeles, the lure of celebrity distracts Bombay, who begins to neglect the team for a luxurious lifestyle. The team wins easy victories over Trinidad and Tobago and Italy in the double-elimination tournament. Fulton Reed and Dean Portman gain recognition for their enforcer skills, and are dubbed the "Bash Brothers". Backup goaltender Julie Gaffney asks Bombay for a chance to play, but is told to wait as goalie Greg Goldberg is on a hot streak.

However, the team suffers an embarrassing 12–1 defeat against Iceland, coached by ex-NHL player Wolf "The Dentist" Stansson. USA plays badly, Dean and Julie are ejected from the game for unsportsmanlike conduct, and star center Adam Banks is slashed in the wrist, after scoring Team USA's only goal. Frustrated, and realizing one more loss will mean elimination, and the end of his celebrity status, Bombay drives his players even harder, but they begin to suffer from complete exhaustion. Realizing the children are too tired to complete their school work or even stay awake in class, the team's tutor Michelle McKay intervenes, cancelling practice and confronting Bombay over his thoughtlessness. Once better rested, the players encounter a street hockey team, led by frequent game attendee Russ Tyler, who teaches them to play like "the real Team USA". Russ impresses the team, with his unique shot: the "knucklepuck" – which rotates end over end rather than spinning around its centerline.

Bombay continues to suffer from the pressure until Jan, brother of Bombay's mentor Hans, visits and reminds him of his love for the game. In their match against Germany, Bombay fails to arrive on time, forcing Charlie to tell the referee Michelle is the team's assistant coach. The team struggles, entering the third period tied, until Bombay arrives and apologizes to the team for his behavior. Inspired by the true return of their coach, the players win the game with their signature "Flying V", and advance to the next round.

The renewed Bombay finally realizes Banks' wrist injury and benches him despite his complaints. To fill the open roster spot, Charlie recruits Russ Tyler, with his knucklepuck, which secures USA's victory over Russia, advancing them to the championship game for a rematch against Iceland. On the day of the game, Banks returns, his injury healed, only to find Team USA with a full roster. Knowing the team needs Russ's knucklepuck and Banks' skill against Iceland, Charlie gives up his own spot, cementing his leadership as true team captain. Bombay recruits Charlie to assist in coaching.

In the final game, the physically imposing Iceland initially dominates as the Ducks incur penalties: Ken picks a fight with an opposing player, after scoring a goal, the Bash Brothers fight the entire Iceland bench and Dwayne lassos an opposing player before he can check Connie. An annoyed Bombay observes, "this isn't a hockey game, it's a circus." as the second period ends, with Iceland ahead 4-1.

After a rousing locker room speech from Bombay and new Duck jerseys from Jan, the team emerges rejuvenated. The Ducks tie the game with goals from Connie, Banks, Luis, and finally Russ, who was targeted by Iceland but disguised himself as Goldberg to pull off a successful "knucklepuck". The game is forced to go to a five-shot shootout. Jesse, Guy, Fulton (with his signature slapshot), and Banks successfully score. With a 4–3 score in favor of the Ducks, Gunnar Stahl, the tournament's leading scorer, is Team Iceland's final shooter. Bombay replaces Goldberg with Julie, who has a faster glove. Gunnar fires a hard slapshot, and Julie falls to the ice. The entire stadium waits in breathless anticipation as she opens her glove and drops the puck, revealing the game-winning save and the Ducks' triumph over Iceland to win the tournament. Despite his disappointment, Stannson congratulates Bombay, and Gunnar congratulates Charlie stating "Good work, Captain Duck."

The team returns to Minnesota, and sing Queen's "We Are the Champions" around a campfire.

== Cast ==
- Emilio Estevez as Gordon Bombay
  - Brock Pierce as young Gordon in flashbacks
- Michael Tucker as Don Tibbles
- Jan Rubeš as Jan,
- Kathryn Erbe as Michelle
- Joshua Jackson as Charlie
- Elden Henson as Fulton
- Shaun Weiss as Greg Goldberg
- Matt Doherty as Lester Averman
- Brandon Adams as Jesse Hall
- Vincent Larusso as Adam Banks
- Marguerite Moreau as Connie Moreau
- Garette Ratliff Henson as Guy Germaine
- Aaron Lohr as Dean Portman
- Ty O'Neal as Dwayne Robertson
- Kenan Thompson as Russ Tyler
- Mike Vitar as Luis Mendoza
- Colombe Jacobsen as Julie "The Cat" Gaffney
- Justin Wong as Kenny Wu
- Carsten Norgaard as Wolf "The Dentist" Stansson
- Maria Ellingsen as Maria
- Scott Whyte as Gunnar Stahl
- Vicellous Reon Shannon as James Tyler, Russ's older brother
- Robert Pall as Mr. Bombay, Gordon's father
- Bob Miller as Announcer
- Nancy Stephens as Coliseum Reporter

There are several cameo appearances in D2: The Mighty Ducks. Kristi Yamaguchi, Greg Louganis, Kareem Abdul-Jabbar, Cam Neely, Chris Chelios, Luc Robitaille and Steven Brill were spectators at the party. Wayne Gretzky, Darren Pang and Mike Emrick also made cameo appearances in the film.

=== Departures ===
Mighty Ducks players that were in the first film but not this one:

- Tammy Duncan (Jane Plank; her figure skating skills were replaced with those of Ken Wu)
- Tommy Duncan (Danny Tamberelli)
- Terry Hall (Jussie Smollett, despite the continuation of the character's brother, Jesse)
- Dave Karp (Aaron Schwartz)
- Peter Mark (J.D. Daniels; his street punk goon image was replaced with those of Dean Portman)
- Phillip Banks (Hal Fort Atkinson III)
- Hans (Joss Ackland; Bombay's mentor was replaced by his brother, Jan, though Ackland reprises his role in the third film)

== Production ==
The Mighty Ducks spawned a sequel and Iceland was chosen instead of Russia as enemies.

The filming of the final game was the very first event to take place at the then brand new Arrowhead Pond, which attracted approximately 15,000 people. As the filming would span over several days, the production team was aware that the crowd would not be as consistent. To accommodate the dwindling crowd, cardboard stand-ups were brought in and moved around to fill-in shots.

Scott Whyte originally auditioned for the role of Dean Portman, but the role was given to Aaron Lohr instead.

== Reception ==
=== Box office ===
In its opening weekend, the film grossed $10,356,748 domestically. It earned a final domestic box office total gross of $45.6 million.

=== Critical response ===
Like its predecessor, the film received negative reviews. It has a 20% rating on Rotten Tomatoes from 15 critics and a 59% rating from audiences, with an average rating of 4.2/10. Desson Howe of The Washington Post wrote: "D2: The Mighty Ducks reaches an extraordinary low – even for a Disney sequel. This unctuous barrage of flag-waving, message-mongering, counterfeit morality, which contains the stalest kiddie-team heroics in recent memory, makes the original, innocuous 'Ducks' look like one of the Great Works."

Audiences polled by CinemaScore an average grade of "A" on an A+ to F scale.

=== Year-end worst-of lists ===
- 9th – Glenn Lovell, San Jose Mercury News

== Home media ==
The film was released on VHS on August 17, 1994, on DVD on September 3, 2002 and was also released on Blu-ray Disc on May 23, 2017 as Disney Movie Club exclusive.

== Soundtrack ==
1. Queen – "We Will Rock You"
2. Poorboys – "You Ain't Seen Nothin' Yet" (Bachman-Turner Overdrive Cover)
3. Gary Glitter – "Rock and Roll"
4. Martha Wash – "Mr. Big Stuff"
5. David Newman – "Mighty Ducks Suite"
6. Tag Team – "Whoomp! (There It Is)"
7. The Troggs – "Wild Thing"
8. Gear Daddies – "Zamboni"
9. Queen – "We Are the Champions"
10. John Bisaha – "Rock the Pond"

== See also ==
- List of films about ice hockey
