= The Mighty Ducks (film) =

1992 film by Stephen Herek

- Theatrical release poster
- Directed by: Stephen Herek
- Written by: Steven Brill
- Produced by: Jon Avnet; Jordan Kerner
- Starring: Emilio Estevez; Joss Ackland; Lane Smith
- Cinematography: Thomas Del Ruth
- Edited by: Larry Bock; John F. Link
- Music by: David Newman
- Production companies: Walt Disney Pictures; Avnet–Kerner Productions
- Distributed by: Buena Vista Pictures Distribution
- Release date: October 2, 1992
- Running time: 103 minutes
- Country: United States
- Language: English
- Budget: $14 million
- Box office: $50.8 million

The Mighty Ducks (also known as D1: The Mighty Ducks, and Champions in the United Kingdom and Australia) is a 1992 American sports comedy drama film directed by Stephen Herek and written by Steven Brill. It is the first film in the Mighty Ducks franchise. The film stars Emilio Estevez, Joss Ackland, and Lane Smith. It follows a self-centered Minnesota lawyer who is sentenced to community service coaching a ragtag youth hockey team. In some countries, the home release copies were printed with the title as The Mighty Ducks Are the Champions to avoid confusion with the title of the sequel.

The Mighty Ducks was released in the United States on October 2, 1992, by Buena Vista Pictures Distribution. Despite receiving mostly negative reviews from critics, the film was a financial success, grossing $50.8 million over its $14 million budget.

The year after the film's release, The Walt Disney Company founded an NHL hockey team, named the Mighty Ducks of Anaheim.

== Plot ==
Gordon Bombay is a successful but arrogant Minneapolis defense attorney. After winning his 30th case, his boss Gerald Ducksworth gives kudos, but also reproves Bombay for his lack of decorum in court. Bombay shrugs it off and celebrates by drinking and driving and is arrested. Ducksworth is able to have the disposition of Bombay’s case suspended on the condition that he serve 500 hours of community service coaching the local "District 5" Pee-Wee hockey team. Bombay has a troubled hockey past: as a youth player in 1973, he missed a decisive penalty shot for the Hawks, leading to an overtime loss and the disappointment of his stern coach, Jack Reilly.

Bombay meets his new team, finding they lack equipment, skill, and even a practice rink. Their first game is a humiliating 17-0 defeat against the Hawks, still coached by Reilly. Frustrated, Bombay berates the players, then teaches them to fake injuries to draw penalties, which backfires and causes more tension. Charlie Conway, one of the players, stands up to Bombay’s tactics.

Visiting his mentor Hans, who owns a sporting goods store, Bombay reflects on quitting hockey after his father’s death and Reilly’s criticism, even though he was viewed as a prodigy with the potential to play in the NHL. Encouraged by Hans, Bombay reconnects with his love of the sport, skating on a frozen pond as he did as a child. He apologizes to Charlie and his mother, starting to earn the team’s trust.

Bombay persuades Ducksworth to sponsor the team, providing new gear and practice time. Renamed "the Ducks" after Ducksworth, the team learns fundamentals and earns a tie in their next game. They recruit three new players: siblings Tommy and Tammy Duncan, who are skilled figure skaters, and Fulton Reed, a powerful shooter. Recognizing Charlie’s potential, Bombay begins mentoring him.

Bombay discovers that due to redistricting, Hawks star Adam Banks should be playing for the Ducks, and he forces Reilly to transfer Banks. However, after overhearing a misinterpreted remark from Bombay, most of the team quits, forfeiting their next game. Ducksworth (who is close friends with Banks’ father) tries to broker a deal with the league to keep Banks on the Hawks, which requires Bombay to withdraw his protest. Bombay, although initially tempted, refuses, as he believes the deal to be against the spirit of fair play and teamwork, virtues that Ducksworth said he had hoped Bombay would learn. When Bombay declines to change his mind, Ducksworth fires him.

Bombay regains the trust of the team, and with Banks joining them, they qualify for the playoffs by defeating the Huskies. The Ducks advance to face the Hawks in the championship. During the game, Reilly orders his players to injure Banks, knocking him out. The Ducks rally, tying the score late in the final period. With time expiring, Charlie is tripped, earning a penalty shot—the same situation Bombay faced as a youth. Unlike Reilly, Bombay encourages Charlie to simply do his best. Charlie executes the "triple-deke" move Bombay taught him and scores, winning the title for the Ducks.

After the victory, Bombay boards a bus to attend a minor-league tryout arranged by Basil McRae of the Minnesota North Stars, who once played Pee-Wee hockey with him. Nervous about competing with younger players, Bombay is encouraged by the Ducks, who remind him of his own advice: believe in yourself and keep trying. He promises to return next season to help them defend their championship.

== Cast ==
- Emilio Estevez as Gordon Bombay
  - Brock Pierce as Gordon Bombay at 10 years old
- Joss Ackland as Hans, Gordon's mentor
- Lane Smith as Jack Reilly
- Heidi Kling as Casey Conway, Charlie's single mother
- Josef Sommer as Gerald Ducksworth, Gordon's boss
- Joshua Jackson as Charlie Conway
- Elden Ratliff as Fulton Reed
- Shaun Weiss as Greg Goldberg
- M. C. Gainey as Lewis
- Matt Doherty as Lester Averman
- Brandon Adams as Jesse Hall, Terry's older brother
- J. D. Daniels as Peter Mark
- Aaron Schwartz as Dave Karp
- Garette Ratliff Henson as Guy Germaine
- Marguerite Moreau as Connie Moreau
- Jane Plank as Tammy Duncan, Tommy's older sister
- Jussie Smollett as Terry Hall, Jesse's younger brother
- Vincent A. LaRusso as Adam Banks
- Danny Tamberelli as Tommy Duncan, Tammy's younger brother
- Michael Ooms as McGill
- Casey Garven as Larson
- George Coe as Judge Weathers
- Hal Fort Atkinson III as Phillip Banks, Adam's father
- John Beasley as Mr. Hall, Jesse & Terry's father
- Robert Pall as Mr. Bombay, Gordon's father
- John Paul Gamoke as Mr. Tolbert
- Steven Brill as Frank Huddy
- Bob Miller as Game Announcer
- Basil McRae as himself
- Mike Modano as himself

== Production ==
The film was written by Steve Brill, who later sued for royalties for the film. Jake Gyllenhaal turned down the role of Charlie Conway. Emilio Estevez was cast in 1991, after Herek was impressed by his performances in Brat Pack films, The Outsiders (1983), The Breakfast Club (1985) and St. Elmo's Fire (1985).

It was filmed in several locations in Minneapolis, Minnesota. Principal photography took place between January and April 1992.

== Reception ==
=== Box office ===
The film grossed $50,752,337 in the United States and Canada, becoming a surprising success with audiences. The Mighty Ducks made $54 million in home video rentals according to Video Week magazine in 1993.

=== Critical reception ===
The Mighty Ducks received underwhelming critical reviews at the time of its release. It holds a 27% approval rating on Rotten Tomatoes, based on 30 reviews, with an average rating of 4.1/10. The site's consensus reads, "The Mighty Ducks has feel-good goals, but only scores a penalty shot for predictability". On Metacritic, it has a score of 46 out of 100 based on 18 critics, indicating "mixed or average reviews". Audiences polled by CinemaScore gave the film an average grade of "A" on an A+ to F scale.

Roger Ebert said the film was "sweet and innocent, and that at a certain level it might appeal to younger kids. I doubt if its ambitions reach much beyond that", and gave it a 2-star rating. Rita Kempley of The Washington Post said that "Steven Brill, who has a small role in the film, constructed the screenplay much as one would put together some of those particleboard bookcases from IKEA".

Emilio Estevez was surprised at the popularity of the movie series.

=== Accolades ===
American Film Institute recognition

- AFI's 100 Years...100 Cheers - Nominated
- AFI's 10 Top 10 - Nominated

== Home media ==
The film was released on VHS on April 14, 1993, DVD on April 11, 2000, and on Blu-ray Disc on May 23, 2017.

== Sequels ==
The unexpected box-office success of the film inspired two sequels, D2: The Mighty Ducks (1994) and D3: The Mighty Ducks (1996), and an animated TV series (the latter taking on a science fiction angle with actual anthropomorphic ducks). While both sequels failed to match the original film's gross, they were still financially successful.

== See also ==
- The Bad News Bears, an earlier film with a similar premise.
- List of films about ice hockey
