= My First Love (1988 film) =

- Genre: Drama; Romance
- Story by: Ed Kaplan
- Directed by: Gilbert Cates
- Starring: Richard Kiley; Bea Arthur; Joan Van Ark; Barbara Barrie; Anne Francis
- Music by: Alf Clausen
- Country of origin: United States
- Original language: English

Production
- Executive producers: Jon Avnet; Jordan Kerner
- Producers: Gail Mutrux; Craig Zisk
- Cinematography: Tom Haughton; Mark Irwin
- Editor: Kyle Curry
- Running time: 93 minutes
- Production company: The Avnet/Kerner Company

Original release
- Network: ABC
- Release: December 4, 1988

My First Love is a 1988 comedy-romance television film starring Richard Kiley and Bea Arthur.

== Plot ==
The story revolves around an older widowed woman reconnecting with her high school sweetheart after not seeing him for thirty-five years.

== Reception ==
The Los Angeles Times said "this is Arthur’s show all the way and she makes the time worthwhile, even when the second half of the script doesn’t measure up to the first. Shy and awkward, feminine and determined, she has never been more appealing."
