= D3: The Mighty Ducks =

1996 film by Robert Lieberman

- Theatrical release poster
- Directed by: Robert Lieberman
- Screenplay by: Steven Brill; Jim Burnstein
- Story by: Kenneth Johnson; Jim Burnstein
- Based on: Characters by Steven Brill
- Produced by: Jordan Kerner; Jon Avnet
- Starring: Emilio Estevez; Jeffrey Nordling; Heidi Kling; Joss Ackland
- Cinematography: David Hennings
- Edited by: Patrick Lussier
- Music by: J. A. C. Redford
- Production companies: Walt Disney Pictures; Avnet-Kerner Productions
- Distributed by: Buena Vista Pictures Distribution
- Release date: October 4, 1996
- Running time: 104 minutes
- Country: United States
- Language: English
- Box office: $22.9 million

D3: The Mighty Ducks (also known as The Mighty Ducks 3) is a 1996 American sports comedy-drama film directed by Robert Lieberman and sequel to the 1994 film D2: The Mighty Ducks. It is the third and final installment in the Mighty Ducks trilogy and was produced by Walt Disney Pictures and distributed by Buena Vista Pictures Distribution. Emilio Estevez, Heidi Kling, Joss Ackland, Joshua Jackson, Elden Henson, Shaun Weiss, Matt Doherty, Garette Ratliff Henson, Marguerite Moreau, Vincent Larusso, Aaron Lohr, Ty O'Neal, Kenan Thompson, Mike Vitar, Colombe Jacobsen, and Justin Wong reprise their roles from the previous films in the series with Scott Whyte, who played Gunnar in the second film, returning in a different role and Jeffrey Nordling joining the cast.

== Plot ==
After their victory at the Junior Goodwill Games, the youth ice hockey team known as the Mighty Ducks are awarded junior varsity hockey scholarships to Eden Hall Academy, a prestigious prep school in the Minneapolis area that Coach Bombay once attended. Team captain Charlie Conway struggles with the transition from childhood to adolescence and feels betrayed when Bombay leaves the Ducks to take a job with the Junior Goodwill Games. Adding to his frustration, Dean Portman and Jesse Hall decline their scholarships and do not join the team. Before classes begin, Bombay reassures Charlie that the team will be in good hands under new coach Ted Orion, a former NHL player.

The Ducks’ start at Eden Hall is rocky. They face bullying from the dominant varsity team, the Warriors, and must adjust to Coach Orion’s much stricter style. Orion emphasizes a disciplined “two-way hockey” system, abandoning many of the Ducks’ signature tricks and unconventional plays. These changes create tension between Charlie and Orion, ultimately leading Orion to strip Charlie of his captaincy. The team also loses Adam Banks, who moves up to varsity. In their first game, the Ducks squander a large lead and tie. Soon after, the varsity team challenges them to an unsanctioned early-morning game and soundly defeats them. Disappointed, Orion takes away the Ducks’ jerseys and declares, “The Ducks are dead.” In response, both Charlie and Fulton Reed quit the team. Fulton backs out of Charlie's plan to continue hockey at public schools, not wanting to play for the rest of his life.

Charlie’s behavior begins to alienate him from his mother, his teammates, and Hans, who is seriously ill. When Hans suddenly dies, Bombay visits Charlie the day after the funeral and brings him back to Eden Hall. Bombay explains that Orion’s NHL career ended when the Minnesota North Stars relocated to Dallas, and Orion chose to stay behind to care for his paraplegic daughter. He also shares how he first came to coach the Ducks and reveals that he told Orion that Charlie was the heart and soul of the team. Bombay hoped both Charlie and Orion would learn from one another. Moved by Bombay’s words and filled with remorse, Charlie decides to rejoin the team. Fulton, now reconsidering his own future, also returns.

When Charlie arrives at the team bus before the next game, he tells Orion that he is ready to commit to playing “two-way hockey.” Surprised but pleased, Orion welcomes him back. Before the team departs, however, Headmaster Dean Buckley informs them that the board of trustees intends to revoke the Ducks’ scholarships and offers Orion the opportunity to rebuild the team with new players. Orion refuses, standing by his team and threatening to resign. At a board meeting the next day, Bombay—formerly a practicing lawyer—represents the Ducks and successfully argues their case. By threatening legal action and exposing the board to a lawsuit, he forces them into a no-win situation, and they reluctantly reinstate the scholarships. Adam Banks then returns to the Ducks. The varsity team are furious with the Ducks staying at Eden Hall, and make a bet with them: If the Warriors win the upcoming varsity-JV match, the Ducks leave Eden Hall of their own volition, but if the Ducks win, the team named will be officially changed to the "Eden Hall Mighty Ducks" from "Eden Hall Warriors".

Inspired by Charlie’s renewed leadership, the team fully commits to Orion’s system. Before the final game between junior varsity and varsity, Orion restores the Ducks’ jerseys, giving the team a renewed sense of identity and purpose. During the game, the varsity team dominates offensively, but the Ducks hold strong on defense, keeping the score tied through two periods. During the second intermission, Dean Portman returns, providing a crucial boost. Late in the game, the Ducks must kill a 5-on-3 penalty. With only seconds remaining, Charlie breaks away from the defense and draws the goalie, then passes the puck back to Goldberg—now playing defense—who scores into an open net as time expires, securing a 1–0 victory.

After the win, Charlie embraces Coach Orion and spots Bombay in the crowd. Together, they look across the rink at a newly unveiled Eden Hall banner featuring the Ducks’ logo, per the stipulation of what would happen if the Warriors lost the match, leaving the varsity team dejected and humiliated as they leave the ice in disgrace. Bombay leaves the arena with a smile as the crowd erupts in celebration.

== Cast ==
- Emilio Estevez as Gordon Bombay
- Jeffrey Nordling as Ted Orion
- David Selby as Dean Buckley, the dean of Eden Hall Academy
- Heidi Kling as Casey Conway, Charlie's single mother
- Joss Ackland as Hans, Gordon's mentor
- Joshua Jackson as Charlie Conway, captain of the Ducks.
- Elden Ryan Ratliff as Fulton Reed, one half of the Bash Brothers known for his super slapshot and enforcer skills.
- Shaun Weiss as Greg "The Goalie" Goldberg, later gets moved up to defense after Conway and Fulton briefly leave the team.
- Vincent A. Larusso as Adam Banks
- Matt Doherty as Lester Averman
- Garette Ratliff Henson as Guy Germaine
- Marguerite Moreau as Connie Moreau
- Michael Cudlitz as Cole, varsity Warriors tough guy and school bully
- Christopher Orr as Rick Riley, captain of the varsity Warriors
- Aaron Lohr as Dean Portman, the other half of the Bash Brothers who eventually rejoins the team at the end.
- Ty O'Neal as Dwayne Robertson
- Kenan Thompson as Russ Tyler, known for his Knuckle Puck slapshot.
- Mike Vitar as Luis Mendoza
- Colombe Jacobsen as Julie "The Cat" Gaffney, becomes the primary starter in net for the Ducks
- Justin Wong as Ken Wu
- Scott Whyte as Scott "Scooter" Holland, Julie's love interest
- Margot Finley as Linda, Charlie's love interest
- Benjamin Salisbury as Josh, the sports announcer

Paul Kariya, then-captain of the Mighty Ducks of Anaheim (now Anaheim Ducks) when the film was released, makes a cameo appearance during the second intermission of the Ducks/Varsity Warriors game. The film's co-writer Steven Brill was an attendant at an arcade.

== Production ==
The third movie was originally going to be darker in tone, with the main antagonists written to be Bulgarians. Brandon Adams, who portrayed the character of Jesse Hall in the previous films, is the only actor to not reprise his role as a Duck. His absence in the film is explained as his character having moved away. Jesse appeared in the original script for the third film, but with minimal lines and screen time compared to the first two films.

Parts of the movie were filmed at Carleton College in Northfield, Minnesota.

== Reception ==
=== Box office ===
The movie debuted at No. 4 in the box office and ended up grossing $22,936,273 in the US. It is the lowest-grossing film of the trilogy.

=== Critical response ===
Like its predecessors, the film received negative reviews and holds a 20% rating based on 15 reviews with an average rating of 3.8/10 on review aggregator Rotten Tomatoes.

John Anderson of the Los Angeles Times called the film "a self-reverential salute to Ducks" while also saying that the film was "lazier" than its predecessors. Roger Ebert of the Chicago Sun-Times described the film as predictable, saying that the film was "more or less the same story: Evil, petty, vindictive, mean-spirited, cheating, lying snobs try to stop them, but the Ducks, after first dealing with cockiness, infighting, pride, anger and a new coach, redeem themselves in the big match." Peter Stack of the San Francisco Chronicle said the film "struggles for laughs. Even its familiar, heavily orchestrated showdown-on-ice between the Ducks and a rude rival is little more than a tedious rehash of puckish mayhem".

== Home media ==
The film was released on VHS on January 21, 1997, on DVD on September 2, 2002 and on Blu-ray as a Disney Movie Club exclusive on May 23, 2017. It was also released on the Disney+ streaming platform on September 4, 2020.

== See also ==
- List of films about ice hockey
