= List of American films of 1992 =

This is a list of American films released in 1992.

== Box office ==
The highest-grossing American films released in 1992, by domestic box office gross revenue, are as follows:

Highest-grossing films of 1992
Rank	Title	Distributor	Domestic gross
1	Aladdin	Walt Disney Studios Motion Pictures	$217,350,219
2	Home Alone 2: Lost in New York	20th Century Fox	$173,585,516
3	Batman Returns	Warner Bros.	$162,831,698
4	Lethal Weapon 3	Warner Bros.	$144,731,527
5	A Few Good Men	Columbia Pictures	$141,340,178
6	Sister Act	Touchstone Pictures	$139,605,150
7	The Bodyguard	Warner Bros.	$121,945,720
8	Wayne's World	Paramount Pictures	$121,697,323
9	Basic Instinct	TriStar Pictures / Carolco Pictures	$117,727,224
10	A League of Their Own	Columbia Pictures	$107,533,928

== January–March ==
Opening		Title	Production company	Cast and crew	Ref.
J A N U A R Y	10	Kuffs	Universal Pictures	Bruce A. Evans (director/screenplay); Raynold Gideon (screenplay); Christian Slater, Milla Jovovich, Tony Goldwyn, Bruce Boxleitner, Troy Evans, George de la Peña, Leon Rippy, Mary Ellen Trainor	
J A N U A R Y	10	The Hand That Rocks the Cradle	Hollywood Pictures	Curtis Hanson (director); Amanda Silver (screenplay); Annabella Sciorra, Rebecca De Mornay, Matt McCoy, Ernie Hudson, Julianne Moore, John de Lancie, Madeline Zima	
J A N U A R Y	17	Freejack	Warner Bros. Pictures / Morgan Creek Productions	Geoff Murphy (director); Steven Pressfield, Ronald Shusett, Dan Gilroy (screenplay); Emilio Estevez, Mick Jagger, Rene Russo, Anthony Hopkins, Jonathan Banks, Grand L. Bush, David Johansen, Amanda Plummer, Wilbur Fitzgerald, Jerry Hall	
J A N U A R Y	17	A Gnome Named Gnorm	PolyGram Filmed Entertainment / Interscope Communications	Stan Winston (director); John Watson, Pen Densham (screenplay); Anthony Michael Hall, Jerry Orbach, Claudia Christian, Eli Danker, Mark Harelik, Robert Z'Dar, Shane Mahan, Rob Paulsen, Will Ryan, Greg Kean, Deanna Oliver, Pat Crawford Brown, Steve Susskind, Wren T. Brown	
J A N U A R Y	17	Juice	Paramount Pictures	Ernest R. Dickerson (director/screenplay); Gerard Brown (screenplay); Omar Epps, Tupac Shakur, Jermaine Hopkins, Khalil Kain, Cindy Herron, Vincent Laresca, Samuel L. Jackson, George O. Gore, Grace Garland, Queen Latifah, Victor Campos, Mark "Flex" Knox, Michael Badalucco, Pablo Guzmán, LaTanya Richardson Jackson, Oran "Juice" Jones, Donald Faison, Doctor Dré, Ed Lover, Fab 5 Freddy, EPMD, Anthony "Treach" Criss, D-Nice, Grandmaster Flash, Special Ed, Yolanda "Yo-Yo" Whitaker, Bruklin Harris, Darien Berry, Maggie Rush, Rony Clanton, Jacqui Dickerson, Randy Frazier, Corwin Moore	
J A N U A R Y	24	Love Crimes	Miramax Films	Lizzie Borden (director); Allan Moyle, Laurie Frank (screenplay); Sean Young, Patrick Bergin, Arnetia Walker, James Read	
J A N U A R Y	31	Hard Promises	Columbia Pictures	Martin Davidson (director); Jule Selbo (screenplay); Sissy Spacek, William Petersen, Brian Kerwin, Mare Winningham, Olivia Burnette, Peter MacNicol, Jeff Perry, Ann Wedgeworth, Amy Wright, Lois Smith, Margaret Bowman	
J A N U A R Y	31	Hurricane Smith	Warner Bros. Pictures	Colin Budds (director); Peter A. Kinloch, Kevin James Dobson (screenplay); Carl Weathers, Jürgen Prochnow, Cassandra Delaney, Tony Bonner, David Argue, John Ewart, Louise McDonald, Suzie MacKenzie, Karen Hall, Johnny Raaen	
J A N U A R Y	31	Into the Sun	Trimark Pictures	Fritz Kiersch (director); John Brancato, Michael Ferris (screenplay); Michael Paré, Anthony Michael Hall, Deborah Moore, Terry Kiser, Brian Haley, Michael St. Gerard, Linden Ashby, Melissa Moore	
J A N U A R Y	31	Shining Through	20th Century Fox	David Seltzer (director/screenplay); Michael Douglas, Melanie Griffith, Liam Neeson, Joely Richardson, John Gielgud, Francis Guinan, Anthony Walters, Victoria Shalet, Sheila Allen, Stanley Beard, Sylvia Syms, Ronald Nitschke, Hansi Jochmann, Lorinne Vozoff, Mathieu Carriere, Wolf Kahler, Wolfe Morris, William Hope, Nigel Whitmey, Rob Freeman, Jay Benedict, Thomas Kretschmann, Constanze Engelbrecht, Ludwig Haas, Clement von Franckenstein, Lorelei King, Michael Gempart, Hana Maria Pravda, Wolfgang Müller, Suzanne Roquette, Roy Alon, Juliet Aubrey, Marianne Hettinger	
J A N U A R Y	31	Voyager	Castle Hill Productions	Volker Schlöndorff (director); Rudy Wurlitzer (screenplay); Sam Shepard, Julie Delpy, Barbara Sukowa, Dieter Kirchlechner, Traci Lind, Deborra-Lee Furness, August Zirner, Thomas Heinze, Bill Dunn, Peter Berling, Lorna Farrar, Kathleen Matiezen, Lou Cutell, Charley Hayward, Irwin Wynn, Warwick Shaw	
F E B R U A R Y	5	Mississippi Masala	Metro-Goldwyn-Mayer	Mira Nair (director); Sooni Taraporevala (screenplay); Denzel Washington, Sarita Choudhury, Roshan Seth, Sharmila Tagore, Charles S. Dutton, Joe Seneca, Ranjit Chowdhry, Joseph Olita, Mohan Gokhale, Mohan Agashe, Tico Wells, Yvette Hawkins, Anjan Srivastav, Mira Nair	
F E B R U A R Y	7	Final Analysis	Warner Bros. Pictures	Wesley Strick (director/screenplay); Richard Gere, Kim Basinger, Uma Thurman, Eric Roberts, Keith David, Paul Guilfoyle, Robert Harper, George Murdock, Shirley Prestia, Tony Genaro, Harris Yulin, Wood Moy, Corey Fischer, Rico Alaniz, John Roselius, Erick Avari, Agustin Rodriguez, Rita Zohar	
F E B R U A R Y	7	Medicine Man	Hollywood Pictures	John McTiernan (director); Tom Schulman, Sally Robinson (screenplay); Sean Connery, Lorraine Bracco, José Wilker	
F E B R U A R Y	14	The Great Mouse Detective (also known as The Adventures of the Great Mouse Detective) (re-release)	Walt Disney Pictures	Ron Clements, Burny Mattinson, Dave Michener, John Musker (directors/screenplay); Matthew O'Callaghan, Mel Shaw, Pete Young, Vance Gerry, Steve Hulett, Bruce Morris (screenplay); Vincent Price, Barrie Ingham, Val Bettin, Susanne Pollatschek, Candy Candido, Alan Young, Diana Chesney, Eve Brenner, Frank Welker, Basil Rathbone, Laurie Main, Wayne Allwine, Tony Anselmo, Walker Edmiston, Melissa Manchester	
F E B R U A R Y	14	Wayne's World	Paramount Pictures	Penelope Spheeris (director); Mike Myers, Bonnie Turner, Terry Turner (screenplay); Mike Myers, Dana Carvey, Rob Lowe, Tia Carrere, Brian Doyle-Murray, Lara Flynn Boyle, Michael DeLuise, Dan Bell, Lee Tergesen, Kurt Fuller, Sean Gregory Sullivan, Colleen Camp, Donna Dixon, Frederick Coffin, Michael G. Hagerty, Chris Farley, Meat Loaf, Charles Noland, Robert Patrick, Ione Skye, Frank DiLeo, Carmen Filpi, Alice Cooper, Stan Mikita, Ed O'Neill, Penelope Spheeris	
F E B R U A R Y	21	Falling from Grace	Columbia Pictures	John Mellencamp (director); Larry McMurtry (screenplay); John Mellencamp, Mariel Hemingway, Claude Akins, Dub Taylor, Kay Lenz, Larry Crane, Kate Noonan, Deirdre O'Connell, John Prine, Brent Huff	
F E B R U A R Y	21	Radio Flyer	Columbia Pictures / Donner/Shuler-Donner Productions	Richard Donner (director); David M. Evans (screenplay); Elijah Wood, Joseph Mazzello, Lorraine Bracco, John Heard, Adam Baldwin, Ben Johnson, Garette Ratliff, Thomas Ian Nicholas, Victor DiMattia, Robert Munic, Adam Hendershott, Mike Simmrin, Elden Henson, Lois Foraker, Steve Kahan, Scott Nimerfro, Hannah Wood, Tom Hanks	
F E B R U A R Y	21	Stop! Or My Mom Will Shoot	Universal Pictures / Northern Lights Entertainment	Roger Spottiswoode (director); Blake Snyder, William Osborne, William Davies (screenplay); Sylvester Stallone, Estelle Getty, JoBeth Williams, Al Fann, Roger Rees, Martin Ferrero, Gailard Sartain, John Wesley, J. Kenneth Campbell, Ving Rhames, Richard Schiff, Dennis Burkley, Ella Joyce, Nicholas Sadler, Vanessa Angel, Marjean Holden, Patti Yasutake, Jophery Brown, Manny Perry, Ernie Lively, Julia Montgomery, Dorian Gregory	
F E B R U A R Y	21	This Is My Life	20th Century Fox	Nora Ephron (director/screenplay); Delia Ephron (screenplay); Julie Kavner, Samantha Mathis, Gaby Hoffmann, Carrie Fisher, Dan Aykroyd, Bob Nelson, Marita Geraghty, Welker White, Caroline Aaron, Kathy Najimy, Danny Zorn, Renée Lippin, Joy Behar, Estelle Harris, Sidney Armus, David Eisner, Annie Golden, Tim Blake Nelson, Ellen Cleghorne, Valri Bromfield, Louis Di Bianco, Sylvia Kauders, Theresa Tova, Billy Van, Bo Dietl, Harvey Miller, Patrick Rose, Kate McGregor-Stewart, Diane Sokolow, Tom Wood, Barbara Stewart, Faye Cohen, Marcia DeBonis, Heather Brown	
F E B R U A R Y	28	The Gate II: Trespassers	Vision p.d.g. / Alliance Entertainment	Tibor Takács (director); Michael Nankin (screenplay); Louis Tripp, Pamela Segall, Simon Reynolds, James Villemaire, Neil Munro, James Kidnie, Gerry Mendicino, Andrea Ladányi, Elva Mai Hoover, Irene Pauzer, Todd Waite, Layne Coleman	
F E B R U A R Y	28	The Mambo Kings	Warner Bros. Pictures	Arne Glimcher (director); Cynthia Cidre (screenplay); Armand Assante, Antonio Banderas, Cathy Moriarty, Maruschka Detmers, Desi Arnaz Jr., Roscoe Lee Browne, Talisa Soto, Vondie Curtis-Hall, Cordelia Gonzales, Tito Puente, Helena Carroll, Celia Cruz, Scott Cohen, William Thomas Jr., Yul Vazquez, Anh Duong, Colleen Fitzpatrick, Machito, Jonathan Del Arco, Carlos Gómez, Thomas F. Duffy, Stephanie Blake, Julie Pinson	
F E B R U A R Y	28	Memoirs of an Invisible Man	Warner Bros. Pictures	John Carpenter (director); Robert Collector, Dana Olsen, William Goldman (screenplay); Chevy Chase, Daryl Hannah, Sam Neill, Michael McKean, Stephen Tobolowsky, Jim Norton, Pat Skipper, Paul Perri, Richard Epcar, Steven Barr, Gregory Paul Martin, Patricia Heaton, Barry Kivel, Donald Li, Rosalind Chao, Shay Duffin, Sam Anderson, Ellen Albertini Dow, Rip Haight, Aaron Lustig	
F E B R U A R Y	29	For Richer, for Poorer	HBO Pictures / Citadel Entertainment	Jay Sandrich (director); Stan Daniels (screenplay); Jack Lemmon, Talia Shire, Jonathan Silverman, Joanna Gleason, Madeline Kahn, George Wyner, Dakin Matthews, Stephen Caffrey, Hal Riddle, Paul Collins, Perry Moore, Ivar Brogger, James Gleason, Clifton Collins Jr., Shirley Prestia	
M A R C H	6	Blame It on the Bellboy	Hollywood Pictures	Mark Herman (director/screenplay); Dudley Moore, Bryan Brown, Patsy Kensit, Richard Griffiths, Andreas Katsulas, Bronson Pinchot, Alison Steadman, Penelope Wilton, Jim Carter, Alex Norton, John Grillo, Ronnie Stevens, Lindsay Anderson	
M A R C H	6	Gladiator	Columbia Pictures	Rowdy Herrington (director); Lyle Kessler, Robert Mark Kamen (screenplay); Cuba Gooding Jr., James Marshall, Robert Loggia, Jon Seda, Brian Dennehy, Ossie Davis, T. E. Russell, Cara Buono, John Heard	
M A R C H	6	The Lawnmower Man	New Line Cinema	Brett Leonard (director/screenplay); Gimel Everett (screenplay); Jeff Fahey, Pierce Brosnan, Jenny Wright, Geoffrey Lewis, Jeremy Slate, Dean Norris, Austin O'Brien, Troy Evans	
M A R C H	6	Meatballs 4	Moviestore Entertainment	Bob Logan (director/screenplay); Corey Feldman, Jack Nance, Sarah Douglas, Bojesse Christopher	
M A R C H	6	Once Upon a Crime	Metro-Goldwyn-Mayer	Eugene Levy (director); Rodolfo Sonego, Giorgio Arlorio, Stefano Strucchi, Luciano Vincenzoni, Charles Shyer, Nancy Meyers, Steve Kluger (screenplay); John Candy, James Belushi, Cybill Shepherd, Sean Young, Richard Lewis, Ornella Muti, Giancarlo Giannini, George Hamilton, Joss Ackland, Ann Way, Caterina Boratto, Elsa Martinelli, Eugene Levy	
M A R C H	11	Tiny Toon Adventures: How I Spent My Vacation	Warner Home Video	Rich Arons, Ken Boyer, Kent Butterworth, Barry Caldwell, Alfred Gimeno, Art Leonardi, Byron Vaughns (directors); Paul Dini, Nicholas Hollander, Tom Ruegger, Sherri Stoner (screenplay); Charlie Adler, Tress MacNeille, Joe Alaskey, Don Messick, Jonathan Winters, Edie McClurg, Frank Welker, Cree Summer, Sorrell Booke, Rob Paulsen, Maurice LaMarche, Gail Matthius, Kath Soucie, Candi Milo, Paul Julian	
M A R C H	13	American Me	Universal Pictures	Edward James Olmos (director); Floyd Mutrux, Desmond Nakano (screenplay); Edward James Olmos, William Forsythe, Pepe Serna, Daniel A. Haro, Sal Lopez, Vira Montes, Danny De La Paz, Daniel Villarreal, Evelina Fernandez, Roberto Martin Marquez, Dyana Ortelli, Jacob Vargas, Eric Close, Rigoberto Jimenez, Cary-Hiroyuki Tagawa, Robby Robinson, Ron Thompson, Rafael H. Robledo	
M A R C H	13	Article 99	Orion Pictures	Howard Deutch (director); Ron Cutler (screenplay); Ray Liotta, Kiefer Sutherland, Forest Whitaker, Lea Thompson, John Mahoney, John C. McGinley, Keith David, Kathy Baker, Eli Wallach, Troy Evans, Noble Willingham, Lynne Thigpen, Jeffrey Tambor, Rutanya Alda	
M A R C H	13	Highway to Hell	Hemdale	Ate de Jong (director); Brian Helgeland (screenplay); Patrick Bergin, Adam Storke, Chad Lowe, Kristy Swanson, Richard Farnsworth, Pamela Gidley, C.J. Graham, Lita Ford, Gilbert Gottfried, Anne Meara, Ben Stiller, Jerry Stiller, Kevin Peter Hall, Jarrett Lennon, Amy Stiller, Be Deckard, Michael Reid MacKay	
M A R C H	13	Howards End	Sony Pictures Classics	James Ivory (director); Ruth Prawer Jhabvala (screenplay); Anthony Hopkins, Vanessa Redgrave, Helena Bonham Carter, Emma Thompson, James Wilby, Samuel West, Jemma Redgrave, Prunella Scales, Joseph Bennett, Adrian Ross Magenty, Jo Kendall, Ian Latimer, Simon Callow, Mary Nash, Siegbert Prawer, Susie Lindeman, Nicola Duffett, Mark Payton, Barbara Hicks, Peter Cellier, Crispin Bonham-Carter, Patricia Lawrence, Margery Mason, Peter Darling, Mark Tandy, Anne Lambton, Allie Byrne, Sally Geoghegan	
M A R C H	13	My Cousin Vinny	20th Century Fox	Jonathan Lynn (director); Dale Launer (screenplay); Joe Pesci, Marisa Tomei, Ralph Macchio, Mitchell Whitfield, Fred Gwynne, Lane Smith, Bruce McGill, Austin Pendleton, Chris Ellis, James Rebhorn, Maury Chaykin, Paulene Myers, Raynor Scheine, Michael Simpson, Lou Walker, Kenny Jones	
M A R C H	13	Shakes the Clown	IRS Media	Bobcat Goldthwait (director/screenplay); Bobcat Goldthwait, Julie Brown, Adam Sandler, Blake Clark, Tom Kenny, Paul Dooley, Kathy Griffin, Robin Williams, Paul Kozlowski, Dan Spencer, Jeremy Kramer, Jack Gallagher, Bruce Baum, Greg Travis, Florence Henderson, Scott Herriott, LaWanda Page, Martin Charles Warner, Johnny Silver, Tim Kazurinsky, Sydney Lassick, Tony V.	
M A R C H	20	Basic Instinct	TriStar Pictures / Carolco Pictures	Paul Verhoeven (director); Joe Eszterhas (screenplay); Michael Douglas, Sharon Stone, George Dzundza, Jeanne Tripplehorn, Denis Arndt, Leilani Sarelle, Bruce A. Young, Chelcie Ross, Dorothy Malone, Wayne Knight, Daniel von Bargen, Stephen Tobolowsky, Jack McGee, Bill Cable, Mitch Pileggi, Mary Pat Gleason, Freda Foh Shen, James Rebhorn, Bradford English, Juanita Jennings, Anne Lockhart, Benjamin Mouton	
M A R C H	20	Noises Off	Touchstone Pictures / Amblin Entertainment	Peter Bogdanovich (director); Marty Kaplan (screenplay); Michael Caine, Carol Burnett, Denholm Elliott, Julie Hagerty, Marilu Henner, Mark Linn-Baker, Christopher Reeve, John Ritter, Nicollette Sheridan	
M A R C H	20	Proof	Fine Line Features	Jocelyn Moorhouse (director/screenplay); Hugo Weaving, Geneviève Picot, Russell Crowe, Heather Mitchell, Jeffrey Walker, Daniel Pollock, Frankie J. Holden, Frank Gallacher, Saskia Post, Yvonne Bickerstaffe, Cliff Ellen, Tania Uren, Robert James O'Neill, Anthony Rawling, Darko Tuscan	
M A R C H	20	Raise the Red Lantern	Orion Classics	Zhang Yimou (director); Ni Zhen (screenplay); Gong Li, Ma Jingwu, He Saifei, Cao Cuifen, Jin Shuyuan, Kong Lin, Zhou Qi, Cui Zhihgang, Xiao Chu, Cao Zhengyin, Ding Weimin	
M A R C H	20	Shadows and Fog	Orion Pictures	Woody Allen (director/screenplay); Woody Allen, Kathy Bates, John Cusack, Mia Farrow, Jodie Foster, Fred Gwynne, Julie Kavner, Madonna, John Malkovich, Kenneth Mars, Kate Nelligan, Donald Pleasence, Lily Tomlin, Philip Bosco, Charles Cragin, Robert Joy, William H. Macy, James Rebhorn, John C. Reilly, Wallace Shawn, Kurtwood Smith, Josef Sommer, David Ogden Stiers, Daniel von Bargen, Michael Kirby	
M A R C H	27	The Cutting Edge	Metro-Goldwyn-Mayer	Paul Michael Glaser (director); Tony Gilroy (screenplay); D. B. Sweeney, Moira Kelly, Roy Dotrice, Terry O'Quinn, Dwier Brown, Chris Benson, Michael Hogan, Kevin Peeks, Rachelle Ottley, Barry Flatman, Christine Hough, Doug Ladret	
M A R C H	27	Ladybugs	Paramount Pictures	Sidney J. Furie (director); Curtis Burch (screenplay); Rodney Dangerfield, Jackée Harry, Jonathan Brandis, Ilene Graff, Vinessa Shaw, Tom Parks, Randall May, Jeanetta Arnette, Crystal Cooke, Jennifer Frances Lee, Vanessa Monique Rossel, Johna Stewart-Bowden, Jandi Swanson, Nancy Parsons, Blake Clark, Tommy Lasorda	
M A R C H	27	The Power of One	Warner Bros. Pictures	John G. Avildsen (director); Robert Mark Kamen (screenplay); Stephen Dorff, Armin Mueller-Stahl, John Gielgud, Morgan Freeman, Daniel Craig, Ian Roberts, Fay Masterson, Brian O'Shaughnessy, Marius Weyers, Clive Russell, Winston Ntshona, Jeremiah Mnisi, Dominic Walker, Faith Edwards, Alois Moyo, Simon Fenton	
M A R C H	27	Ruby	Triumph Films	John Mackenzie (director); Stephen Davis (screenplay); Danny Aiello, Sherilyn Fenn, Arliss Howard, Tobin Bell, Joe Cortese, Richard C. Sarafian, Leonard Termo, David Duchovny, Carmine Caridi, Marc Lawrence, Joe Viterelli, John Roselius, Willie Garson, Jeffrey Nordling, Veronica Hart, Maurice Benard, Scott Lawrence, Bill Seward, Mary Chris Wall, David Steen, Rodger Boyce, Brad Leland, Ritch Brinkley, John Connally, Nellie Connally, John F. Kennedy Jr., Caroline Kennedy, John F. Kennedy, Jacqueline Kennedy Onassis	
M A R C H	27	White Men Can't Jump	20th Century Fox	Ron Shelton (director/screenplay); Wesley Snipes, Woody Harrelson, Rosie Perez, Tyra Ferrell, Cylk Cozart, Kadeem Hardison, Eloy Casados, Marques Johnson, Nigel Miguel, John Marshall Jones, Duane Martin, Bill Henderson, Jon Hendricks, Freeman Williams, Louis Price, Alex Trebek, Reynaldo Rey, Lanei Chapman, Don Fullilove, Johnny Gilbert, Gregg Daniel, Chick Hearn, Stu Lantz, Walter Jones, Gary Payton, Harry Perry, John Sheehan, Ernest Harden Jr., David Roberson, Kevin Benton, Sonny Craver, Frank Rossi, Allan Malamud	
M A R C H	28	The Last of His Tribe	HBO Pictures / River City Productions	Harry Hook (director); Stephen Harrigan (screenplay); Jon Voight, Graham Greene, David Ogden Stiers, Jack Blessing, Anne Archer, Daniel Benzali, Charles Martinet, Angela Paton, Christianne Hauber, Carl D. Parker, Benne Alder, Loryn Barlese, Gilbert Bear, Neva Hutchinson, Trudy Kinerson, Beverly LaBeau, George Maguire, C. W. Morgan, Stephen Pocock, Victor Preston, Nick Scoggin, Toby Stump	

== April–June ==
Opening		Title	Production company	Cast and crew	Ref.
A P R I L	3	Beethoven	Universal Pictures / Northern Lights Entertainment	Brian Levant (director); John Hughes, Amy Holden Jones (screenplay); Charles Grodin, Bonnie Hunt, Dean Jones, Nicholle Tom, Christopher Castile, Sarah Rose Karr, Oliver Platt, Stanley Tucci, David Duchovny, Patricia Heaton, Laurel Cronin, O-Lan Jones, Nancy Fish, Cory Danziger, Maxine Elliott, Cirroc Lofton, Melora Walters, Joseph Gordon-Levitt, Richard Portnow	
A P R I L	3	Delicatessen	Miramax Films / UGC Distribution	Marc Caro, Jean-Pierre Jeunet (directors/screenplay); Gilles Adrien (screenplay); Dominique Pinon, Marie-Laure Dougnac, Jean-Claude Dreyfus, Karin Viard, Rufus, Ticky Holgado, Jacques Mathou, Howard Vernon, Edith Ker, Marc Caro, Sylvie Laguna, Jean-Francois Perrier, Anne-Marie Pisani, Chick Ortega	
A P R I L	3	Straight Talk	Hollywood Pictures	Barnet Kellman (director); Craig Bolotin (screenplay); Dolly Parton, James Woods, Griffin Dunne, Michael Madsen, Philip Bosco, Jerry Orbach, Deirdre O'Connell, John Sayles, Teri Hatcher, Spalding Gray, Amy Morton, Charles Fleischer, Keith MacKechnie, Jay Thomas, Paula Newsome, Tracy Letts, John Gegenhuber	
A P R I L	3	Thunderheart	TriStar Pictures	Michael Apted (director); John Fusco (screenplay); Val Kilmer, Sam Shepard, Graham Greene, Fred Ward, Fred Dalton Thompson, Sheila Tousey, Ted Thin Elk, John Trudell, Julius Drum, Sarah Brave, Allan R. J. Joseph, Sylvan Pumpkin Seed, Patrick Massett, Rex Linn, Brian A. O'Meara	
A P R I L	3	Rock-a-Doodle	The Samuel Goldwyn Company / Sullivan Bluth Studios	Don Bluth (director); David N. Weiss (screenplay); Glen Campbell, Christopher Plummer, Phil Harris, Ellen Greene, Eddie Deezen, Sandy Duncan, Charles Nelson Reilly, Sorrell Booke, Will Ryan, Toby Scott Ganger, Louise Chamis, Bob Gallico, Jake Steinfeld, T. J. Kuenster, Jim Doherty, John Drummond, Frank Kelly, Kathryn Holcomb, Stan Ivar, Christian Hoff, Jason Marin	
A P R I L	10	Casablanca (re-release)	Warner Bros. Pictures	Michael Curtiz (director); Julius J. Epstein, Philip G. Epstein, Howard Koch (screenplay); Humphrey Bogart, Ingrid Bergman, Paul Henreid, Claude Rains, Conrad Veidt, Sydney Greenstreet, Peter Lorre, Curt Bois, Leonid Kinskey, Madeleine Lebeau, Joy Page, John Qualen, S.Z. Sakall, Dooley Wilson, Marcel Dalio, Helmut Dantine, Gregory Gaye, Torben Meyer, Corinna Mura, Frank Puglia, Richard Ryen, Dan Seymour, Gerald Oliver Smith, Norma Varden, Louis V. Arco, Trude Berliner, Ilka Grünig, Ludwig Stössel, Hans Heinrich von Twardowski, Wolfgang Zilzer, Leon Belasco, Monte Blue, Dick Botiller, George M. Carleton, Spencer Chan, Gino Corrado, Adrienne D'Ambricourt, Jean De Briac, Jean Del Val, Herbert Evans, Martin Garralaga, Creighton Hale, Winifred Harris, Olaf Hytten, Michael Mark, Frank Mazzola, George Meeker, Lal Chand Mehra, Barry Norton, Paul Panzer, Paul Porcasi, Georges Renavent, Dewey Robinson, Henry Rowland, Lester Sharpe, Rafael Trujillo, Ellinor Vanderveer, Norma Varden, Leo White	
A P R I L	10	FernGully: The Last Rainforest	20th Century Fox (Note: Owned by Machine Media Advisors, with distribution handled by Shout! Studios)	Bill Kroyer (director); Jim Cox (screenplay); Tim Curry, Samantha Mathis, Christian Slater, Jonathan Ward, Robin Williams, Grace Zabriskie, Geoffrey Blake, Robert Pastorelli, Cheech Marin, Tommy Chong, Tone Loc, Townsend Coleman, Brian Cummings, Kathleen Freeman, Danny Mann, Neil Ross, Pamela Segall, Lauri Hendler, Rosanna Huffman, Harvey Jason, Dave Mallow, Janet Gilmore, Naomi Lewis, Anderson Wong, Paige Pollack, Holly Dorff, Gary Schwartz	
A P R I L	10	Newsies	Walt Disney Pictures	Kenny Ortega (director); Bob Tzudiker, Noni White (screenplay); Christian Bale, Bill Pullman, David Moscow, Luke Edwards, Robert Duvall, Ann-Margret, Ele Keats, Aaron Lohr, Max Casella, Trey Parker, Michael A. Goorjian, Gabriel Damon, Marty Belafsky, Jeffrey DeMunn, Deborra-Lee Furness, Kevin Tighe, Michael Lerner, Shon Greenblatt, David Sheinkopf, Charles Cioffi, William Boyett, Marc Lawrence, Arvie Lowe Jr.	
A P R I L	10	The Player	Fine Line Features	Robert Altman (director); Michael Tolkin (screenplay); Tim Robbins, Greta Scacchi, Fred Ward, Whoopi Goldberg, Peter Gallagher, Brion James, Cynthia Stevenson, Vincent D'Onofrio, Dean Stockwell, Richard E. Grant, Sydney Pollack, Lyle Lovett, Dina Merrill, Leah Ayres, Randall Batinkoff, Jeremy Piven, Gina Gershon, Michael Tolkin, Stephen Tolkin, Peter Koch, Jeff Weston, Steve Allen, Richard Anderson, René Auberjonois, Harry Belafonte, Shari Belafonte, Karen Black, Michael Bowen, Gary Busey, Robert Carradine, Charles Champlin, Cher, James Coburn, Cathy Lee Crosby, John Cusack, Brad Davis, Paul Dooley, Peter Falk, Felicia Farr, Kasia Figura, Louise Fletcher, Dennis Franz, Teri Garr, Leeza Gibbons, Scott Glenn, Jeff Goldblum, Elliott Gould, Joel Grey, David Alan Grier, Buck Henry, Anjelica Huston, Kathy Ireland, Steve James, Sally Kellerman, Sally Kirkland, Jack Lemmon, Marlee Matlin, Andie MacDowell, Malcolm McDowell, Jayne Meadows, Martin Mull, Nick Nolte, Alexandra Powers, Bert Remsen, Patricia Resnick, Burt Reynolds, Jack Riley, Julia Roberts, Mimi Rogers, Annie Ross, Alan Rudolph, Jill St. John, Susan Sarandon, Adam Simon, Rod Steiger, Joan Tewkesbury, Brian Tochi, Lily Tomlin, Robert Wagner, Ray Walston, Bruce Willis, Marvin Young, Ned Bellamy, Scott Shaw, Patrick Swayze, Marina Zenovich	
A P R I L	10	Sleepwalkers	Columbia Pictures / Ion Pictures	Mick Garris (director); Stephen King (screenplay); Brian Krause, Mädchen Amick, Alice Krige, Lyman Ward, Cindy Pickett, Ron Perlman, Jim Haynie, Dan Martin, Lucy Boryer, Glenn Shadix, Stephen King, John Landis, Joe Dante, Clive Barker, Tobe Hooper, Mark Hamill	
A P R I L	17	The Babe	Universal Pictures	Arthur Hiller (director); John Fusco (screenplay); John Goodman, Kelly McGillis, Trini Alvarado, Bruce Boxleitner, Peter Donat, James Cromwell, J. C. Quinn, Joseph Ragno, Richard Tyson, Ralph Marrero, Bob Swan, Bernard Kates, Michael McGrady, Danny Goldring, Guy Barile, Bernie Gigliotti, Ian McCabe, W. Earl Brown, Thom C. Simmons, Rick Reardon, Randy Steinmeyer, Wayne Messmer, Larry Cedar, Michael Kendall, Harry Hutchinson, Irma P. Hall, Stephen Caffrey	
A P R I L	17	Boris and Natasha: The Movie	Showtime Networks	Charles Martin Smith (director); Brad Hall, Charles Fradin, Linda Favila, Anson Downes (screenplay); Dave Thomas, Sally Kellerman, Andrea Martin, John Calvin, Paxton Whitehead, Larry Cedar, Christopher Neame, Alex Rocco, John Candy, Anthony Newley, Sid Haig, John Travolta, Rance Howard, Charles Martin Smith, Arye Gross, John Voldstad, James Gleason, Vance Colvig Jr., June Foray, Jim Cummings, Corey Burton, Thomas F. Wilson, Amy Brandis, Steve Como	
A P R I L	17	Brain Donors	Paramount Pictures	Dennis Dugan (director); Pat Proft (screenplay); John Turturro, Bob Nelson, Mel Smith, George de la Pena, John Savident, Nancy Marchand, Juliana Donald, Spike Alexander, Teri Copley	
A P R I L	17	City of Joy	TriStar Pictures	Roland Joffé (director); Mark Medoff (screenplay); Patrick Swayze, Om Puri, Pauline Collins, Shabana Azmi, Art Malik, Vishal Slathia, Anashua Majumdar, Ayesha Dharker, Santu Chowdhury, Imran Badsah Khan, Shyamanand Jalan, Anjan Dutt, Nabil Shaban, Sanjay Pathak, Debatosh Ghosh, Sunita Sengupta, Loveleen Mishra, Pavan Malhotra, Iftekhar	
A P R I L	17	Deep Cover	New Line Cinema	Bill Duke (director); Michael Tolkin, Henry Bean (screenplay); Larry Fishburne, Jeff Goldblum, Charles Martin Smith, Victoria Dillard, Gregory Sierra, Glynn Turman, Clarence Williams III, Roger Guenveur Smith, Kamala Lopez, Jaime Cardriche, Sandra Gould, Sydney Lassick, Julio Oscar Mechoso, Clifton Powell	
A P R I L	22	The Playboys	The Samuel Goldwyn Company	Gillies MacKinnon (director); Shane Connaughton, Kerry Crabbe (screenplay); Albert Finney, Aidan Quinn, Robin Wright, Milo O'Shea, Alan Devlin, Niamh Cusack, Ian McElhinney, Niall Buggy, Adrian Dunbar, Stella McCusker, Anna Livia Ryan	
A P R I L	24	A Midnight Clear	Beacon Pictures	Keith Gordon (director/screenplay); Ethan Hawke, Gary Sinise, Peter Berg, Kevin Dillon, Arye Gross, Frank Whaley, John C. McGinley, David Jensen, Larry Joshua, Curt Lowens, Rachel Griffin, Timothy Shoemaker	
A P R I L	24	Highway 61	Shadow Shows Incorporated	Bruce McDonald (director/screenplay); Don McKellar, Allan Magee (screenplay); Don McKellar, Valerie Buhagiar, Earl Pastko, Peter Breck, Steve Fall, Tav Falco, Jello Biafra, Art Bergmann	
A P R I L	24	Passed Away	Hollywood Pictures	Charlie Peters (director/screenplay); Bob Hoskins, Blair Brown, Tim Curry, Frances McDormand, William Petersen, Pamela Reed, Peter Riegert, Maureen Stapleton, Nancy Travis, Jack Warden, Don Brockett, Patricia O'Connell, Louis Mustillo, Ann Shea, Sara Rue, Deborah Rush, Patrick Breen, Teri Polo, Jayce Bartók, Dylan Baker, Jim Corr, Dan Futterman	
A P R I L	24	White Sands	Warner Bros. Pictures / Morgan Creek Productions	Roger Donaldson (director); Daniel Pyne (screenplay); Willem Dafoe, Mary Elizabeth Mastrantonio, Mickey Rourke, Samuel L. Jackson, M. Emmet Walsh, James Rebhorn, Maura Tierney, Beth Grant, Mimi Rogers, Miguel Sandoval, Ken Thorley, Royce D. Applegate, Fred Dalton Thompson, Alexander Nicksay, Fredrick Lopez, John Lafayette, Jack Kehler, Megan Butler, Lisa Cloud, Steve Cormier	
A P R I L	24	Year of the Comet	Columbia Pictures / Castle Rock Entertainment	Peter Yates (director); William Goldman (screenplay); Tim Daly, Penelope Ann Miller, Louis Jourdan, Ian Richardson, Nick Brimble, Shane Rimmer, Timothy Bentinck	
A P R I L	29	Leaving Normal	Universal Pictures	Edward Zwick (director); Ed Solomon (screenplay); Christine Lahti, Meg Tilly, Lenny Von Dohlen, Maury Chaykin, Patrika Darbo, Eve Gordon, James Eckhouse, Brett Cullen, James Gammon	
M A Y	1	Folks!	20th Century Fox	Ted Kotcheff (director); Robert Klane (screenplay); Tom Selleck, Don Ameche, Anne Jackson, Christine Ebersole, Wendy Crewson, Michael Murphy, Robert Pastorelli, Joseph Wayne Miller, Jon Favreau, George O. Petrie, Kevin Michael Chevalia, Maggie Murphy, T. J. Parish, John McCormack, Jackye Roberts, Omar Cabral, Marilyn Dodds Frank, Ilse Earl	
M A Y	1	K2	Paramount Pictures	Franc Roddam (director); Patrick Meyers, Scott Roberts (screenplay); Michael Biehn, Matt Craven, Raymond J. Barry, Luca Bercovici, Patricia Charbonneau, Julia Nickson-Soul, David Cubitt, Hiroshi Fujioka, Jamal Shah	
M A Y	1	Live Wire	New Line Cinema	Christian Duguay (director); Bart Baker (screenplay); Pierce Brosnan, Ron Silver, Ben Cross, Lisa Eilbacher, Tony Plana, Al Waxman, Brent Jennings, Philip Baker Hall, Norman Burton, Lauren Holly	
M A Y	1	Night on Earth	Fine Line Features / Pandora Cinema	Jim Jarmusch (director/screenplay); Winona Ryder, Gena Rowlands, Giancarlo Esposito, Armin Mueller-Stahl, Rosie Perez, Isaach De Bankole, Beatrice Dalle, Emile Abossolo M'Bo, Pascal N'Zonzi, Roberto Benigni, Paolo Bonacelli, Matti Pellonpaa, Kari Vaananen, Sakari Kuosmanen, Tomi Salmela	
M A Y	1	Split Second	Astro Distribution	Tony Maylam, Ian Sharp (directors); Gary Scott Thompson (screenplay); Rutger Hauer, Kim Cattrall, Neil Duncan, Michael J. Pollard, Alun Armstrong, Pete Postlethwaite, Ian Dury, Roberta Eaton, Tony Steedman, Steven Hartley, Sara Stockbridge	
M A Y	8	Big Girls Don't Cry... They Get Even	New Line Cinema	Joan Micklin Silver (director); Mark Goddard (screenplay); Hillary Wolf, Griffin Dunne, Patricia Kalember, Jenny Lewis, Ben Savage, Adrienne Shelly, Dan Futterman, Margaret Whitton, David Strathairn, Trenton Teigen, Jessica Seely	
M A Y	8	CrissCross	Metro-Goldwyn-Mayer	Chris Menges (director); Scott Sommer (screenplay); Goldie Hawn, Arliss Howard, David Arnott, Steve Buscemi, Keith Carradine, James Gammon	
M A Y	8	The Favour, the Watch and the Very Big Fish	Trimark Pictures	Ben Lewin (director/screenplay); Bob Hoskins, Jeff Goldblum, Natasha Richardson, Michel Blanc, Angela Pleasence, Jean-Pierre Cassel, Artus de Penguern, Jean-Michel Ribes, Jacques Villeret, Samuel Chaimovitch, Sacha Vikouloff, Claudine Mavros, Carlos Kloster, Caroline Jacquin, Patrick Albenque, Gérard Zalcberg, Beth McFadden, Julien Calderbank, Pamela Goldblum, Maximilien Seide, Claire Magnin, Maurice Herman, Pascal Beckar, Edouard Hastings, Michel Sebban, Jean-François Vlerick, Geoffrey Carey	
M A Y	8	One False Move	IRS Media	Carl Franklin (director); Billy Bob Thornton, Tom Epperson (screenplay); Bill Paxton, Cynda Williams, Michael Beach, Billy Bob Thornton, Jim Metzler, Earl Billings, Jimmy Bridges	
M A Y	8	Poison Ivy	New Line Cinema	Katt Shea (director); Andy Ruben, Katt Shea (screenplay); Drew Barrymore, Sara Gilbert, Tom Skerritt, Cheryl Ladd, Jeanne Sakata, Leonardo DiCaprio, Billy Zane	
M A Y	13	The Waterdance	The Samuel Goldwyn Company	Neal Jimenez, Michael Steinberg (directors); Neal Jimenez (screenplay); Eric Stoltz, Wesley Snipes, William Forsythe, Helen Hunt, Elizabeth Peña, Grace Zabriskie, Kimberly Scott, William Allen Young	
M A Y	15	The Adventures of Ichabod and Mr. Toad (re-release)	Walt Disney Pictures	Ben Sharpsteen, Jack Kinney, Clyde Geronimi, James Algar (directors); Erdman Penner, Winston Hibler, Joe Rinaldi, Ted Sears, Homer Brightman, Harry Reeves (screenplay); Eric Blore, Pat O'Malley, John Ployardt, Colin Campbell, Campbell Grant, Claude Allister, The Rhythmaires, Oliver Wallace, Alec Harford, Pinto Colvig, Leslie Denison, Edmond Stevens, James Bodrero, Billy Bletcher, Clarence Nash, Gloria Wood, Bing Crosby, Basil Rathbone	
M A Y	15	Lethal Weapon 3	Warner Bros. Pictures / Silver Pictures	Richard Donner (director); Jeffrey Boam, Robert Mark Kamen (screenplay); Mel Gibson, Danny Glover, Joe Pesci, Rene Russo, Stuart Wilson, Steve Kahan, Darlene Love, Nick Chinlund, Alan Scarfe, Mary Ellen Trainor, Delores Hall, Traci Wolfe, Mark Pellegrino, Kenneth Tigar, Sven-Ole Thorsen, Henry Brown, Miguel A. Núñez Jr., Philip Moon, Danny "Big Black" Rey, Vince Howard, Paul Hipp, Lauren Shuler Donner, Stephen T. Kay, Henry Kingi, Marian Collier, Selma Archerd, Paul Ganus, J. Mills Goodloe, Jan de Bont, Anthony Johnson, Jack McGee, Mic Rodgers, Norman D. Wilson, Ebonie Smith, Damon Hines, Gregory Millar, Andrew Hill Newman, Jason Rainwater	
M A Y	15	Monster in a Box	Fine Line Features / Channel Four Films / Jon Blair Film Company	Nick Broomfield (director); Spalding Gray (screenplay); Spalding Gray	
M A Y	22	Alien 3	20th Century Fox	David Fincher (director); David Giler, Walter Hill, Larry Ferguson (screenplay); Sigourney Weaver, Charles S. Dutton, Charles Dance, Lance Henriksen, Pete Postlethwaite, Holt McCallany, Paul McGann, Danny Webb, Brian Glover, Ralph Brown, Vincenzo Nicoli, Christopher John Fields, Peter Guinness, Leon Herbert, DeObia Oparei, Christopher Fairbank, Phil Davis, Niall Buggy, Clive Mantle	
M A Y	22	Encino Man	Hollywood Pictures	Les Mayfield (director); George Zaloom, Shawn Schepps (screenplay); Sean Astin, Brendan Fraser, Pauly Shore, Megan Ward, Robin Tunney, Michael DeLuise, Patrick Van Horn, Dalton James, Rick Ducommun, Ke Huy Quan, Mariette Hartley, Richard Masur, Esther Scott, Michole Briana White, Rose McGowan, Jack Noseworthy, Christian Hoff, Erick Avari, Gerry Bednob, Sandra Hess, Allen Russell, Infectious Grooves, Ellen Blain, Mike Diamente	
M A Y	22	Far and Away	Universal Pictures / Imagine Entertainment	Ron Howard (director); Bob Dolman (screenplay); Tom Cruise, Nicole Kidman, Thomas Gibson, Robert Prosky, Barbara Babcock, Cyril Cusack, Eileen Pollock, Colm Meaney, Michelle Johnson, Niall Tóibín, Barry McGovern, Gary Lee Davis, Jared Harris, Steven O'Donnell, Peadar Lamb, J.G. Devlin, Brendan Cauldwell, Derry Power, Noel O'Donovan, Macdara Ó Fátharta, Eileen Colgan, Todd Hallowell, Clint Howard, Rynagh O'Grady, Brendan Gleeson, Hoke Howell, Rocco Sisto, Rance Howard, Pauline McLynn, Aedin Moloney, James Jude Courtney, Anthony De Longis, Carl N. Ciarfalio, Bob Dolman	
M A Y	22	Zentropa	Nordisk Film Biografdistribution / Det Danske Filminstitut / Svenska Filminstitutet / Eurimages / UGC Distribution	Lars von Trier (director/screenplay); Niels Vørsel (screenplay); Max von Sydow, Jean-Marc Barr, Barbara Sukowa, Udo Kier, Ernst-Hugo Järegård, Erik Mørk, Eddie Constantine, Jørgen Reenberg, Lars von Trier, Baard Owe, Henning Jensen, Benny Poulsen, Erno Müller, Michael Phillip Simpson, Holger Perfort, Anne Werner Thomsen	
M A Y	29	The Adjuster	Orion Classics	Atom Egoyan (director/screenplay); Elias Koteas, Arsinee Khanjian, Maury Chaykin, Gabrielle Rose, Jennifer Dale, David Hemblen, Rose Sarkisyan, Armen Kokorian, Jacqueline Samuda, Gerard Parkes, Patricia Collins, Don McKellar, John Gilbert, Stephen Ouimette, Raoul Trujillo	
M A Y	29	Cold Heaven	Hemdale Film Corporation	Nicolas Roeg (director); Allan Scott (screenplay); Theresa Russell, Mark Harmon, James Russo, Julie Carmen, Seymour Cassel, Diana Douglas, Talia Shire, Will Patton, Castulo Guerra	
M A Y	29	Cousin Bobby	Cinevista	Jonathan Demme (director); Jonathan Demme, Robert W. Castle, Jane Castle Moulton, Kate Castle, Nancy Castle, Reverend Louis de la Rosa, Brooklyn Demme, Robert E. Demme, Reverend Susannah Hobbs, Joanne Howard, Reverend Elioba Ladu Minasona, Tom Pakidis, Dennis Sloan	
M A Y	29	Sister Act	Touchstone Pictures	Emile Ardolino (director); Paul Rudnick (screenplay); Whoopi Goldberg, Maggie Smith, Harvey Keitel, Bill Nunn, Mary Wickes, Kathy Najimy, Wendy Makkena, Joseph Maher, Robert Miranda, Richard Portnow, Jim Beaver, Jenifer Lewis, Adrienne-Joi Johnson, Lois de Banzie, Max Grodénchik, Michael Durrell, Toni Kalem, Eugene Greytak, Andrea Robinson, Ellen Albertini Dow, Carmen Zapata, Pat Crawford Brown, Susan Johnson, Ruth Kobart, Susan Browning, Darlene Koldenhoven, Edith Diaz, Beth Fowler, Rose Parenti, Charlotte Crossley, Joseph G. Medalis, Isis Carmen Jones, Prudence Wright Holmes, Georgia Creighton, Sheri Izzard	
M A Y	30	Afterburn	HBO Pictures	Robert Markowitz (director); Elizabeth Chandler (screenplay); Laura Dern, Robert Loggia, Vincent Spano, Michael Rooker, Welker White, Richard Jenkins, Andy Romano, Basil Wallace, Gary Basaraba, Dion Anderson, Kasi Lemmons, Daniel Benzali, Cassy Friel, Christopher John Fields, Lewis Dix Jr., Matthew Posey, David Warshofsky, Stephen Burleigh, Paul Perri, Ron Frazier, Pierre Epstein, Richard Fancy, Walter Addison, Peter Jason, Ryan Cutrona, Marjorie Harris, Todd Jeffries, Jeffrey King, Jane Marla Robbins, Jessica Russell	
J U N E	4	Stepfather III	HBO / Trimark Pictures / ITC Entertainment	Guy Magar (director/screenplay); Marc B. Ray (screenplay); Robert Wightman, Priscilla Barnes, David Tom, Season Hubley, John Ingle, Jay Acovone, Christa Miller, Jennifer Bassey, Brenda Strong, Adam Wylie, Dennis Paladino, Stephen Mendel, Mario Roccuzzo, Joan Dareth, Adam Ryen, Mindy Ann Martin, Joel Carlson, Sumer Stamper, Mort Lewis	
J U N E	5	Class Act	Warner Bros. Pictures	Randall Miller (director); Cynthia Friedlob, John Semper, Michael Swerdlick, Richard Brenne, Wayne Allan Rice (screenplay); Christopher "Kid" Reid, Christopher "Play" Martin, Karyn Parsons, Thomas Mikal Ford, Rick Ducommun, Doug E. Doug, George Alvarez, Loretta Devine, Mariann Aalda, Meshach Taylor, Michael Whaley, Pauly Shore, Raye Birk, Reginald Ballard, John Hostetter, Andre Rosey Brown, Lance Crouther, Rhea Perlman, Sam McMurray, Alysia Rogers, David Basulto, lamont Johnson, Patricia Fraser, Simply Marvelous, Baldwin C. Sykes	
J U N E	5	Patriot Games	Paramount Pictures	Phillip Noyce (director); W. Peter Iliff, Donald E. Stewart, Steven Zaillian (screenplay); Harrison Ford, Anne Archer, Patrick Bergin, Sean Bean, Thora Birch, James Fox, Samuel L. Jackson, Polly Walker, J. E. Freeman, James Earl Jones, Richard Harris, Alex Norton, Hugh Fraser, David Threlfall, Alun Armstrong, Berlinda Tolbert, Hugh Ross, Gerald Sim, Pip Torrens, Jonathan Ryan, Andrew Connolly, Tim Dutton, Ellen Geer, Ted Raimi, Jesse D. Goins, Bob Gunton	
J U N E	12	Housesitter	Universal Pictures / Imagine Entertainment	Frank Oz (director); Mark Stein (screenplay); Steve Martin, Goldie Hawn, Dana Delany, Julie Harris, Donald Moffat, Peter MacNicol, Richard B. Shull, Ken Cheeseman, Laurel Cronin, Roy Cooper, Christopher Durang, Heywood Hale Broun, Cherry Jones	
J U N E	16	Waxwork II: Lost in Time	Live Home Video / Electric Pictures	Anthony Hickox (director/screenplay); Zach Galligan, Alexander Godunov, Monika Schnarre, Martin Kemp, Bruce Campbell, Michael Des Barres, Jim Metzler, Sophie Ward, Marina Sirtis, Billy Kane, Juliet Mills, John Ireland, Patrick Macnee, David Carradine, George "Buck" Flower, Paul Hampton, Stanley Sheff, Elisha Shapiro, Maxwell Caulfield, Kate Murtagh, Anthony Hickox, Harrison Young, Frank Zagarino, Brent Bolthouse, Caron Bernstein, Gerry Lively, Paul Madigan, Kim Henderson, Bob Keen, John Mappin, Robert Kass, Drew Barrymore, Godzilla, Joe Baker, James D.R. Hickox, John O'Leary, Erin Breznikar, Michael Viela, Dorian Langdon, Jonathan Breznihar, Mark Courier, Steve Painter, Paul Jones, Alex Butler, Yolanda Jilot	
J U N E	19	Batman Returns	Warner Bros. Pictures	Tim Burton (director); Daniel Waters (screenplay); Michael Keaton, Danny DeVito, Michelle Pfeiffer, Christopher Walken, Michael Gough, Pat Hingle, Michael Murphy, Vincent Schiavelli, Andrew Bryniarski, Cristi Conaway, Doug Jones, Paul Reubens, Diane Salinger, Steven Brill, Steve Witting, Jan Hooks, John Strong, Rick Zumwalt, Anna Katarina, Gregory Scott Cummins, Branscombe Richmond, Sean Whalen, Henry Kingi, Lisa Guerrero, Biff Yeager, Felix Silla, Debbie Lee Carrington, Anthony De Longis, James Murray, Kristine Rose, Erika Andersch, Travis McKenna	
J U N E	19	The Hairdresser's Husband	AMLF	Patrice Leconte (director/screenplay); Claude Klotz (screenplay); Jean Rochefort, Anna Galiena, Roland Bertin, Maurice Chevit, Jacques Mathou, Albert Delpy, Michèle Laroque, Philippe Clévenot, Anne-Marie Pisani	
J U N E	20	A Private Matter	HBO Pictures	Joan Micklin Silver (director); William Nicholson (screenplay); Sissy Spacek, Aidan Quinn, Estelle Parsons, Sheila McCarthy, Leon Russom, Xander Berkeley, Richard Venture, Jeff Perry, Susie Duff, Lance Edwards, Taylor Fry, Steven Gilborn, Jessica Griffis, Nicole Griffis, Carla Gugino, Michael Halpin, Ken Jenkins, Ben Lemon, John Lordan, Allison Mack, William H. Macy, Trever O'Brien, Jessica Seely, James Quill Smith, Noley Thornton, William Utay	
J U N E	25	Munchie	New Concorde	Jim Wynorski (director/screenplay); Michael Hitchcock (screenplay); Loni Anderson, Andrew Stevens, Arte Johnson, Dom DeLuise, Love Hewitt, Monique Gabrielle, Angus Scrimm, Fred Olen Ray, Brinke Stevens, George Buck Flower, Peter Spellos, Linda Shayne, Raven De La Croix, Jaime McEnnan, Scott Ferguson, Mike Simmrin, Toni Naples, Ace Mask, Lenny Juliano, Jay Richardson	
J U N E	26	Pinocchio (re-release)	Walt Disney Pictures	Ben Sharpsteen, Hamilton Luske, Bill Roberts, Norman Ferguson, Jack Kinney, Wilfred Jackson, T. Hee (directors); Ted Sears, Otto Englander, Webb Smith, William Cottrell, Joseph Sabo, Erdman Penner, Aurelius Battaglia (screenplay); Cliff Edwards, Dickie Jones, Christian Rub, Mel Blanc, Walter Catlett, Charles Judels, Evelyn Venable, Frankie Darro, Stuart Buchanan, Marion Darlington, Thurl Ravenscroft	
J U N E	26	Unlawful Entry	20th Century Fox / Largo Entertainment	Jonathan Kaplan (director); George Putnam, John Katchmer, Lewis Colick (screenplay); Kurt Russell, Ray Liotta, Madeleine Stowe, Roger E. Mosley, Ken Lerner, Deborah Offner, Carmen Argenziano, Andy Romano, Harry Northup, Sherrie Rose, Myim Rose, Tony Longo, Dick Miller, Bob Minor, Djimon Hounsou, Victor Brandt, Robert Costanzo	

== July–September ==
Opening		Title	Production company	Cast and crew	Ref.
J U L Y	1	Boomerang	Paramount Pictures / Imagine Entertainment	Reginald Hudlin (director); Barry W. Blaustein, David Sheffield (screenplay); Eddie Murphy, Robin Givens, Halle Berry, David Alan Grier, Grace Jones, Martin Lawrence, Geoffrey Holder, Eartha Kitt, Chris Rock, Tisha Campbell, Lela Rochon, John Witherspoon, Leonard Jackson, Tom Mardirosian, Melvin Van Peebles, Reginald Hudlin, Warrington Hudlin, Kenny Blank, Daryl 'Chill' Mitchell, Olga Merediz, John Canada Terrell	
J U L Y	1	A League of Their Own	Columbia Pictures	Penny Marshall (director); Lowell Ganz, Babaloo Mandel (screenplay); Tom Hanks, Geena Davis, Madonna, Lori Petty, Rosie O'Donnell, Jon Lovitz, David Strathairn, Garry Marshall, Bill Pullman, Anne Ramsay, Megan Cavanagh, Tracy Reiner, Bitty Schram, Renée Coleman, Ann Cusack, Julie Croteau, Janet Jones, Téa Leoni, Don S. Davis, Eddie Jones, Mark Holton, Pauline Brailsford	
J U L Y	10	The Best Intentions	The Samuel Goldwyn Company	Bille August (director); Ingmar Bergman (screenplay); Samuel Fröler, Pernilla August, Max von Sydow, Ghita Nørby, Björn Kjellman, Börje Ahlstedt, Björn Granath, Gunilla Nyroos, Michael Segerström, Eva Gröndahl, Mona Malm, Keve Hjelm, Margaretha Krook, Irma Christenson, Sif Ruud, Lena Endre, Ernst-Hugo Järegård, Hans Alfredson, Anita Björk, Sten Ljunggren	
J U L Y	10	Cool World	Paramount Pictures	Ralph Bakshi (director); Michael Grais, Mark Victor (screenplay); Kim Basinger, Gabriel Byrne, Brad Pitt, Deirdre O'Connell, William Frankfather, Carrie Hamilton, Frank Sinatra Jr., Charlie Adler, Joey Camen, Michael Lally, Maurice LaMarche, Candi Milo, Gregory Snegoff, Patrick Pinney, Michele Abrams, Janni Brenn-Lowen, Jenine Jennings	
J U L Y	10	Prelude to a Kiss	20th Century Fox	Norman René (director); Craig Lucas (screenplay); Alec Baldwin, Meg Ryan, Sydney Walker, Kathy Bates, Ned Beatty, Patty Duke, Stanley Tucci, Debra Monk, Rocky Carroll, Fern Persons, Annie Golden	
J U L Y	10	Universal Soldier	TriStar Pictures / Carolco Pictures	Roland Emmerich (director); Richard Rothstein, Christopher Leitch, Dean Devlin (screenplay); Jean-Claude Van Damme, Dolph Lundgren, Ally Walker, Ed O'Ross, Eric Norris, Leon Rippy, Michael Jai White, Tommy "Tiny" Lister Jr., Jerry Orbach, Tico Wells, Robert Trebor, Gene Davis, Drew Snyder, Joanne Baron, Allan Graf, Joseph Malone, Ralf Moller, Rance Howard, Lilyan Chauvin, Ned Bellamy	
J U L Y	11	The Comrades of Summer	HBO Pictures	Tommy Lee Wallace (director); Robert Rodat (screenplay); Joe Mantegna, Natalya Negoda, Michael Lerner, Mark Rolston, John Fleck, Eric Allan Kramer, Ian Tracey, Jay Brazeau, Dwight Koss, Garry Chalk, Roark Critchlow, Mitchell Davies, Todd Duckworth, Grant Forster, Jano Frandsen, John Gilbert, Doc Harris, Ken Kirzinger, Kim Kondrashoff, Jim Lampley, David Lovgren, David Lewis, Media Maven, Sharlene Martin, Gary Moten, Gerry Bean, Laurie Paton, Roman Podhora, Wren Robertz, Don Thompson, Ken Tremblett, Lloyd T. Williams, Michael Dobson, Vince Murdocco	
J U L Y	17	Honey, I Blew Up the Kid	Walt Disney Pictures	Randal Kleiser (director); Garry Goodrow, Thom Eberhardt, Peter Elbling (screenplay); Rick Moranis, Marcia Strassman, Lloyd Bridges, Robert Oliveri, John Shea, Keri Russell, Ron Canada, Amy O'Neill, Daniel and Joshua Shalikar, Michael Milhoan, Gregory Sierra, Leslie Neale, Julia Sweeney, Linda Carlson, John Paragon, Ken Tobey, Bill Moseley, Edward S. Feldman	
J U L Y	17	Man Trouble	20th Century Fox	Bob Rafelson (director); Carole Eastman (screenplay); Jack Nicholson, Ellen Barkin, Harry Dean Stanton, Beverly D'Angelo, Michael McKean, Saul Rubinek, Viveka Davis, Veronica Cartwright, David Clennon, John Kapelos, Lauren Tom, Paul Mazursky, Gary Graham, Mark Goodman, Robin Greer, Raymond Cruz, Rebecca Broussard, Mary Pat Gleason, David St. James, Virgil Frye, Ken Thorley, Sally Stevens, Ron Hicklin, Darlene Koldenhoven	
J U L Y	17	A Stranger Among Us	Hollywood Pictures	Sidney Lumet (director); Robert J. Avrech (screenplay); Melanie Griffith, Eric Thal, Mia Sara, Tracy Pollan, Lee Richardson, John Pankow, Jamey Sheridan, James Gandolfini, Chris Latta, Jake Weber, David Margulies, Rena Sofer	
J U L Y	22	Captain America	Columbia TriStar Home Video / Marvel Entertainment Group / Jadran Film / 21st Century Film Corporation	Albert Pyun (director); Stephen Tolkin (screenplay); Matt Salinger, Ronny Cox, Ned Beatty, Darren McGavin, Michael Nouri, Melinda Dillon, Kim Gillingham, Scott Paulin	
J U L Y	24	Mistress	Rainbow Releasing	Barry Primus (director/screenplay); J. F. Lawton (screenplay); Robert Wuhl, Martin Landau, Jace Alexander, Danny Aiello, Robert De Niro, Laurie Metcalf, Christopher Walken, Eli Wallach, Sheryl Lee Ralph, Jean Smart, Tuesday Knight	
J U L Y	24	Mo' Money	Columbia Pictures	Peter Macdonald (director); Damon Wayans (screenplay); Damon Wayans, Stacey Dash, Joe Santos, John Diehl, Harry J. Lennix, Marlon Wayans, Larry Brandenburg, Matt Doherty, James Deuter, Rondi Reed, Richard Hamilton, Salli Richardson, Pete Gardner, Lorenzo Clemons, Jackie Hoffman, Bernie Mac, Irma P. Hall, Mark Beltzman, Quincy Wong, Kevin Casey, Art Garfield, Alma Yvonne, Richard E. Butler, Evan Lionel Smith, Gordon McClure, Bill Harris, Robert Swan, Victor Cole, Michael Bacarella	
J U L Y	24	Mom and Dad Save the World	Warner Bros. Pictures	Greg Beeman (director); Chris Matheson, Ed Solomon (screenplay); Teri Garr, Jeffrey Jones, Jon Lovitz, Thalmus Rasulala, Wallace Shawn, Eric Idle, Dwier Brown, Kathy Ireland, Suzanne Ventulett, Michael Stoyanov, Danny Cooksey, Laurie Main, Jeff Doucette, Jonathan Stark, Dan Stanton, Don Stanton, Brent Hinkley, Ed Solomon, Chris Matheson, Tony Cox, Ed Gale, Debbie Lee Carrington, Jack Angel, Joe Zimmerman	
J U L Y	31	Bebe's Kids	Paramount Pictures	Bruce W. Smith (director); Reginald Hudlin (screenplay); Faizon Love, Vanessa Bell Calloway, Marques Houston, Tone Lōc, Nell Carter, Robin Harris, John Witherspoon, Chino 'Fats' Williams, George Wallace, Reynaldo Rey, Phillip Glasser, Louie Anderson, Tom Everett, Kerrigan Mahan, Susan Silo, Peter Renaday, Rich Little, Barry Diamond, Greg Finley, Tina Lifford, Arvie Lowe Jr., DeVaughn Nixon, Wayne Collins Jr., Jonell Green, Myra J., Rodney Winfield, Brad Sanders, BeBe Drake-Massey, Jack Lynch, David Robert Cobb, Stanley B. Clay, Michelle Davison, Judi M. Durand, Maui France, Jaquita Green, Jamie Gunderson, J. D. Hall, Doris Hess, Barbara Iley, Daamen J. Krall, John La Fayette, Josh Lindsay, David Randolph, Noreen Reardon, Gary Schwartz, Cheryl Tyre Smith	
J U L Y	31	Buffy the Vampire Slayer	20th Century Fox	Fran Rubel Kuzui (director); Joss Whedon (screenplay); Kristy Swanson, Luke Perry, Donald Sutherland, Rutger Hauer, Paul Reubens, Hilary Swank, Paris Vaughan, Michele Abrams, Randall Batinkoff, David Arquette, Stephen Root, Natasha Gregson Wagner, Sasha Jenson, Tom Jane, Candy Clark, Mark DeCarlo, Liz Smith, Ricky Dean Logan, Ben Affleck, Alexis Arquette, Seth Green, Ricki Lake, Paul Pesco, Slash	
J U L Y	31	Death Becomes Her	Universal Pictures	Robert Zemeckis (director); Martin Donovan, David Koepp (screenplay); Meryl Streep, Bruce Willis, Goldie Hawn, Isabella Rossellini, Ian Ogilvy, Adam Storke, Nancy Fish, Alaina Reed Hall, Michelle Johnson, Mary Ellen Trainor, William Frankfather, John Ingle, Clement von Franckenstein, Petrea Burchard, Mimi Kennedy, Debra Jo Rupp, Carol Ann Susi, Jonathan Silverman, Meg Wittner, John Enos, Danny Lee Clark, Fabio, Susan Kellermann, Sydney Pollack	
J U L Y	31	Enchanted April	Miramax Films	Mike Newell (director); Peter Barnes (screenplay); Miranda Richardson, Josie Lawrence, Polly Walker, Joan Plowright, Alfred Molina, Michael Kitchen, Jim Broadbent	
A U G U S T	7	3 Ninjas	Touchstone Pictures	Jon Turteltaub (director); Edward Emanuel (screenplay); Victor Wong, Michael Treanor, Max Elliott Slade, Chad Power, Rand Kingsley, Alan McRae, Margarita Franco, Kate Sargeant, Joel Swetow, Professor Toru Tanaka, Patrick Labyorteaux, Race Nelson, D.J. Harder, Clifton Powell, Scott Caudill, Baha Jackson, Fritzi Burr, Rick Avery	
A U G U S T	7	London Kills Me	Fine Line Features / PolyGram Filmed Entertainment / Working Title Films / Channel Four Films	Hanif Kureishi (director/screenplay); Justin Chadwick, Steven Mackintosh, Emer McCourt, Roshan Seth, Fiona Shaw, Brad Dourif, Tony Haygarth, Eleanor David, Alun Armstrong, Nick Dunning, Naveen Andrews, Rowena King, Stevan Rimkus, Ben Peel, Danny John-Jules, Paudge Behan, Yemi Goodman Ajibade, Sandy McDade, Tracey MacLeod, Philip Glenister, Charlie Creed-Miles, Karl Collins, Sean Pertwee, Pippa Hinchley, Marianne Jean-Baptiste, Garry Cooper, Gordon Warnecke, Dave Atkins	
A U G U S T	7	Raising Cain	Universal Pictures	Brian De Palma (director/screenplay); John Lithgow, Lolita Davidovich, Steven Bauer, Frances Sternhagen, Gregg Henry, Tom Bower, Mel Harris, Teri Austin, Gabrielle Carteris, Barton Heyman, Geoff Callan	
A U G U S T	7	Unforgiven	Warner Bros. Pictures	Clint Eastwood (director/screenplay); Clint Eastwood, Gene Hackman, Morgan Freeman, Richard Harris, Jaimz Woolvett, Saul Rubinek, Frances Fisher, Anna Levine, Rob Campbell, Anthony James, Beverley Elliott, Liisa Repo-Martell, Shane Meier, Ron White, Jeremy Ratchford, John Pyper-Ferguson, Frank C. Turner, Lochlyn Munro, David Mucci, Tara Dawn Frederick, Josie Smith, Cherrilene Cardinal, Aline Levasseur, Jefferson Mappin, Mina E. Mina, Henry Kope, Larry Joshua, Ben Cardinal, Philip Hayes	
A U G U S T	7	Whispers in the Dark	Paramount Pictures	Christopher Crowe (director/screenplay); Annabella Sciorra, Jamey Sheridan, Anthony LaPaglia, Jill Clayburgh, John Leguizamo, Deborah Unger, Alan Alda, Anthony Heald, Jacqueline Brookes, Gene Canfield, Joe Badalucco, Bo Dietl, Allison Field, Nicholas J. Giangiulio, Sondra James, David Kramer, Philip Levy, Karen Longwell, Art Malik, Dominic Marcus, William Timoney, Lisa Vidal	
A U G U S T	14	Diggstown	Metro-Goldwyn-Mayer	Michael Ritchie (director); Steven McKay (screenplay); James Woods, Louis Gossett Jr., Bruce Dern, Oliver Platt, Heather Graham, Randall "Tex" Cobb, Thomas Wilson Brown, Duane Davis, Orestes Matacena, Michael McGrady, Jim Caviezel, Frank Collison, Marshall Bell, Wilhelm von Homburg, George D. Wallace, Benny Urquidez, Michael DeLorenzo, David Fresco, Willie Green, Kim Robillard, John Short, Roger Hewlett, Rocky Pepeli, Jeff Benson, Raymond C. Turner, John Walter Davis, Alex Garcia, Cynthia L. James, Kenneth White, Jeremy Roberts, Laura Mae Tate	
A U G U S T	14	Johnny Suede	Miramax Films	Tom DiCillo (director/screenplay); Brad Pitt, Catherine Keener, Calvin Levels, Alison Moir, Nick Cave, Tina Louise, Michael Luciano, Peter McRobbie, Ron Vawter, Dennis Parlato, Michael Mulheren, Samuel L. Jackson, Ashley Gardner, Wilfredo Giovanni Clark, Wayne Maugans, Tom Jarmusch	
A U G U S T	14	Single White Female	Columbia Pictures	Barbet Schroeder (director); Don Roos (screenplay); Bridget Fonda, Jennifer Jason Leigh, Steven Weber, Peter Friedman, Stephen Tobolowsky, Frances Bay, Jessica Lundy, Kenneth Tobey	
A U G U S T	14	Stay Tuned	Warner Bros. Pictures / Morgan Creek Productions (Note: Owned by Morgan Creek Entertainment, with international rights handled by Revolution Studios)	Peter Hyams (director); Tom S. Parker, Jim Jennewein (screenplay); John Ritter, Pam Dawber, Jeffrey Jones, Eugene Levy, David Tom, Heather McComb, Bob Dishy, Erik King, Don Calfa, Susan Blommaert, Joyce Gordon, Dale Wilson, Don Pardo, Lou Albano, Faith Minton, Laura Harris, Kristen Cloke, Gianni Russo, Dave "Squatch" Ward, Michael Hogan, Gene Davis, Jerry Wasserman, Rebecca Toolan, Shane Meier, Serge Houde, John Pyper-Ferguson, Kevin McNulty, Robert Wisden, Salt-N-Pepa, Hurby "Luv Bug" Azor, Fatima Robinson, Ernie Anderson, April Winchell	
A U G U S T	21	Christopher Columbus: The Discovery	Warner Bros. Pictures	John Glen (director); John Briley, Cary Bates, Mario Puzo (screenplay); Marlon Brando, Georges Corraface, Rachel Ward, Robert Davi, Catherine Zeta-Jones, Oliver Cotton, Simon Dormandy, Benicio del Toro, Branscombe Richmond, Tom Selleck	
A U G U S T	21	The Gun in Betty Lou's Handbag	Touchstone Pictures	Allan Moyle (director); Grace Cary Bickley (screenplay); Penelope Ann Miller, Eric Thal, Julianne Moore, William Forsythe, Cathy Moriarty, Alfre Woodard, Xander Berkeley, Ray McKinnon, Andy Romano, Faye Grant, Michael O'Neill, Christopher John Fields, Billie Neal, Marian Seldes, Meat Loaf, Catherine Keener	
A U G U S T	21	Light Sleeper	Fine Line Features	Paul Schrader (director/screenplay); Willem Dafoe, Susan Sarandon, Dana Delany, David Clennon, Mary Beth Hurt, Victor Garber, Jane Adams, Robert Cicchini, Sam Rockwell, David Spade	
A U G U S T	21	Little Nemo: Adventures in Slumberland	Hemdale Film Corporation	Masami Hata, William Hurtz (directors); Chris Columbus, Richard Outten (screenplay); Gabriel Damon, Mickey Rooney, René Auberjonois, Danny Mann, Laura Mooney, Bernard Erhard, Bill Martin, Alan Oppenheimer, Michael Bell, Sidney Miller, Neil Ross, John Stephenson, Greg Burson, Jennifer Darling, Sherry Lynn, Nancy Cartwright, Ellen Gerstell, Tress MacNeille, Michael McConnohie, Beau Weaver, Michael Gough, Kathleen Freeman, June Foray, Gregg Berger, Bert Kramer, Brian Cummings, Rainey Haynes, Jonathan Dokuchitz, Sally Stevens, Carmen Twillie, Lauren Wood, Guy Christopher, Michael Sheehan, Bever-Leigh Banfield, Peggy Abernathy, Sherwood Ball, Ken Chandler, Mitch Gordon, Jamie Lynn Grenham, Diana Harris, Mark Lennon, Kathy Levin, Jack Lynch, Gene Morford, Gary Stockdale, Randy Crenshaw	
A U G U S T	21	Rapid Fire	20th Century Fox	Dwight H. Little (director); Alan McElroy (screenplay); Brandon Lee, Powers Boothe, Nick Mancuso, Raymond J. Barry, Kate Hodge, Tzi Ma, Tony Longo, Michael Paul Chan	
A U G U S T	22	Citizen Cohn	HBO Pictures / Breakheart Films / Spring Creek Productions	Frank Pierson (director); David Franzoni (screenplay); James Woods, Joe Don Baker, Joseph Bologna, Ed Flanders, Jeffrey Nordling, Frederic Forrest, Lee Grant, Pat Hingle, John McMartin, Josef Sommer, Daniel Benzali, Tovah Feldshuh, John Finn, Frances Foster, Allen Garfield, David Marshall Grant, Joe Grifasi, Daniel Hugh Kelly, Karen Ludwig, Peter Maloney, Novella Nelson, Fritz Weaver, Sam Coppola, David Early, Dick Feagler, John Seitz, Robin Thomas, Daniel von Bargen, Nikolai Bulganin, Gary Cooper, Lyndon B. Johnson, Jacqueline Kennedy, John F. Kennedy, Douglas MacArthur, Georgi Malenkov, Adolphe Menjou, Vyacheslav Molotov, Richard Nixon, Pat Nixon, Robert Taylor, Earl Warren	
A U G U S T	26	Laws of Gravity	RKO Pictures	Nick Gomez (director/screenplay); Peter Greene, Edie Falco, Adam Trese, Arabella Field, Paul Schulze, Saul Stein, Tony Fernandez, Larry Meistrich, James Michael McCauley, Rick Groel, Anibal O. Lieras, John Gallagher, David Troup, Miguel Sierra, David Tuttle	
A U G U S T	26	Storyville	20th Century Fox	Mark Frost (director/screenplay); Lee Reynolds (screenplay); James Spader, Joanne Whalley-Kilmer, Jason Robards, Charlotte Lewis, Michael Warren, Piper Laurie, Michael Parks, Chuck McCann, Charles Haid, Woody Strode, Justine Shapiro, George Cheung, Steve Forrest, Jeff Perry, Chino 'Fats' Williams	
A U G U S T	28	Freddie as F.R.O.7	Miramax Films / J&M Entertainment	Jon Acevski (director/screenplay); Ben Kingsley, Jenny Agutter, Brian Blessed, Nigel Hawthorne, Sir Michael Hordern, James Earl Jones, Edmund Kingsley, Phyllis Logan, Victor Maddern, Jonathan Pryce, Prunella Scales, John Sessions, Billie Whitelaw, Adrian De La Touche, David Ashton, Jenny Funnell	
A U G U S T	28	Honeymoon in Vegas	Columbia Pictures / Castle Rock Entertainment	Andrew Bergman (director/screenplay); James Caan, Nicolas Cage, Sarah Jessica Parker, Peter Boyle, Seymour Cassel, Pat Morita, John Capodice, Robert Costanzo, Anne Bancroft, Tony Shalhoub, Burton Gilliam, Clearance Giddens, Ben Stein	
A U G U S T	28	Pet Sematary Two	Paramount Pictures	Mary Lambert (director); Richard Outten (screenplay); Edward Furlong, Anthony Edwards, Clancy Brown, Jared Rushton, Darlanne Fluegel, Jason McGuire, Lisa Waltz	
A U G U S T	28	Twin Peaks: Fire Walk with Me	New Line Cinema	David Lynch (director/screenplay); Robert Engels (screenplay); Sheryl Lee, Moira Kelly, David Bowie, Chris Isaak, Harry Dean Stanton, Ray Wise, Kyle MacLachlan, Kiefer Sutherland, Mädchen Amick, Dana Ashbrook, Phoebe Augustine, Eric Da Re, Miguel Ferrer, Pamela Gidley, Heather Graham, Peggy Lipton, David Lynch, James Marshall, Jürgen Prochnow, Lenny Von Dohlen, Grace Zabriskie, Frances Bay, Catherine E. Coulson, Michael J. Anderson, Frank Silva, Walter Olkewicz, Al Strobel, Gary Hershberger, Michael Ontkean, Warren Frost, Mary Jo Deschanel, Everett McGill, Wendy Robie, Jack Nance, Joan Chen, Kimmy Robertson, Harry Goaz, Michael Horse, Russ Tamblyn, Don S. Davis, Charlotte Stewart	
S E P T E M B E R	4	Bob Roberts	Paramount Pictures	Tim Robbins (director/screenplay); Tim Robbins, Giancarlo Esposito, Ray Wise, Gore Vidal, John Cusack, Peter Gallagher, Alan Rickman, Susan Sarandon, James Spader, Fred Ward, Brian Murray, Rebecca Jenkins, Harry Lennix, Robert Stanton, Kelly Willis, Tom Atkins, David Strathairn, Pamela Reed, Helen Hunt, Lynne Thigpen, Kathleen Chalfant, Matt McGrath, Jack Black, Anita Gillette, Fisher Stevens, Bob Balaban, Allan F. Nicholls, Robert Hegyes, Steve Pink, Jeremy Piven, Shira Piven, Lee Arenberg, Brent Hinkley	
S E P T E M B E R	4	Out on a Limb	Universal Pictures	Francis Veber (director); Joshua Goldin, Daniel Goldin (screenplay); Matthew Broderick, Jeffrey Jones, Heidi Kling, Courtney Peldon, Michael Monks, John C. Reilly	
S E P T E M B E R	11	Blade Runner (Director's Cut)	Warner Bros. Pictures / The Ladd Company / Shaw Brothers / Blade Runner Partnership	Ridley Scott (director); Hampton Fancher, David Peoples (screenplay); Harrison Ford, Rutger Hauer, Sean Young, Edward James Olmos, M. Emmet Walsh, Daryl Hannah, William Sanderson, Brion James, Joe Turkel, Joanna Cassidy, James Hong, Morgan Paull, Hy Pyke	
S E P T E M B E R	11	Crossing the Bridge	Touchstone Pictures / Outlaw Productions	Mike Binder (director/screenplay); Jason Gedrick, Josh Charles, Stephen Baldwin, Jeffrey Tambor, David Schwimmer, Cheryl Pollak, Richard Edson, Abraham Benrubi, Ken Jenkins, Rita Taggart, Hy Anzell, Tom McCarthy, Mike Binder	
S E P T E M B E R	11	Hellraiser III: Hell on Earth	Dimension Films / Fifth Avenue Entertainment	Anthony Hickox (director); Peter Atkins (screenplay); Doug Bradley, Terry Farrell, Paula Marshall, Kevin Bernhardt, Brent Bolthouse, Clayton Hill, Ken Carpenter, Peter Atkins, Aimée Leigh, Eric Willhelm, Robert Hammond, Peter G. Boynton, Armored Saint, Ashley Laurence	
S E P T E M B E R	11	Sneakers	Universal Pictures	Phil Alden Robinson (director/screenplay); Lawrence Lasker, Walter F. Parkes (screenplay); Robert Redford, Dan Aykroyd, Ben Kingsley, Mary McDonnell, River Phoenix, Sidney Poitier, David Strathairn, Stephen Tobolowsky, Timothy Busfield, Eddie Jones, George Hearn, Denise Dowse, Donal Logue, Lee Garlington, James Earl Jones, Gary Hershberger, Bodhi Elfman, James Craven, George Kee Cheung, Paul Jenkins, Jeff Daniel Phillips, Amy Benedict, Michael Milhoan, John Simmit	
S E P T E M B E R	11	Swoon	Fine Line Features	Tom Kalin (director/screenplay); Hilton Als (screenplay); Daniel Schlachet, Craig Chester, Ron Vawter, Michael Kirby, Adina Porter, Bobby Reed, Todd Haynes, John Ventimiglia, Ryan Landry, Christopher Hoover, Paul Connor, Michael Stumm, Valda Z. Drabla, Natalie Stanford, Glenn Backes	
S E P T E M B E R	11	Where the Day Takes You	New Line Cinema	Marc Rocco (director/screenplay); Michael Hitchcock, Kurt Voss (screenplay); Sean Astin, Lara Flynn Boyle, Peter Dobson, Balthazar Getty, Ricki Lake, James LeGros, Dermot Mulroney, Will Smith, Adam Baldwin, Nancy McKeon, Alyssa Milano, Rachel Ticotin, Stephen Tobolowsky, Laura San Giacomo, Kyle MacLachlan, David Arquette, Robert Knepper	
S E P T E M B E R	11	Wind	TriStar Pictures	Carroll Ballard (director); Rudy Wurlitzer, Mac Gudgeon (screenplay); Matthew Modine, Jennifer Grey, Stellan Skarsgård, Cliff Robertson, Jack Thompson, Rebecca Miller, Ned Vaughn	
S E P T E M B E R	12	Teamster Boss: The Jackie Presser Story	HBO Pictures	Alastair Reid (director); Abby Mann (screenplay); Brian Dennehy, Jeff Daniels, María Conchita Alonso, Eli Wallach, Robert Prosky, Donald Moffat, Al Waxman, Tony Lo Bianco, Kate Reid, Brad Sullivan, Jude Ciccolella, Victor Slezak, Val Avery, Frank Pellegrino, Henderson Forsythe, Tony Darrow, Norma Dell'Agnese, Richard Bright, Doug Lennox, Bernie McInerney, Richard Poe, Michael J. Reynolds, George R. Robertson, Larry Solway, Catherine Swing, George Buza	
S E P T E M B E R	18	Captain Ron	Touchstone Pictures	Thom Eberhardt (director); John Dwyer (screenplay); Kurt Russell, Martin Short, Mary Kay Place, Benjamin Salisbury, Meadow Sisto, Emannuel Logroño, J. A. Preston, Dan Butler, Tom McGowan, Paul Anka, Roselyn Sánchez, Jorge Luis Ramos, Tanya Soler, Raúl Estela, Jainardo Batista, Clement Talkington	
S E P T E M B E R	18	Husbands and Wives	TriStar Pictures	Woody Allen (director/screenplay); Woody Allen, Blythe Danner, Judy Davis, Mia Farrow, Juliette Lewis, Liam Neeson, Sydney Pollack, Lysette Anthony, Cristi Conaway, Timothy Jerome, Ron Rifkin, Bruce Jay Friedman, Jeffrey Kurland, Benno Schmidt, Nick Metropolis, Rebecca Glenn, Galaxy Craze, Brian McConnachie, Ron August, John Bucher, Matthew Flint	
S E P T E M B E R	18	Peter's Friends	The Samuel Goldwyn Company	Kenneth Branagh (director); Rita Rudner, Martin Bergman (screenplay); Stephen Fry, Kenneth Branagh, Emma Thompson, Hugh Laurie, Imelda Staunton, Tony Slattery	
S E P T E M B E R	18	Sarafina!	Hollywood Pictures / Miramax Films / BBC	Darrell Roodt (director); Mbongeni Ngema, William Nicholson (screenplay); Whoopi Goldberg, Leleti Khumalo, Miriam Makeba, John Kani, Mbongeni Ngema	
S E P T E M B E R	18	School Ties	Paramount Pictures	Robert Mandel (director); Darryl Ponicsan, Dick Wolf (screenplay); Brendan Fraser, Matt Damon, Chris O'Donnell, Randall Batinkoff, Cole Hauser, Ben Affleck, Anthony Rapp, Amy Locane, Peter Donat, Željko Ivanek, Kevin Tighe, Michael Higgins, Ed Lauter, Peter McRobbie, Andrew Lowery, Jim Garrels	
S E P T E M B E R	18	Singles	Warner Bros. Pictures	Cameron Crowe (director/screenplay); Bridget Fonda, Campbell Scott, Kyra Sedgwick, Matt Dillon, Sheila Kelley, Jim True, Bill Pullman, James LeGros, Ally Walker, Eric Stoltz, Jeremy Piven, Tom Skerritt, Peter Horton, Christopher Kennedy Masterson, Dana Eskelson, Randy Thompson, Paul Giamatti, Xavier McDaniel, Wayne Cody, Cameron Crowe, Pat DiNizio, Tim Burton, Bruce Pavitt, Amy Hill, Debi Mazar, Pearl Jam, Alice in Chains, Soundgarden, Victor Garber	
S E P T E M B E R	18	South Central	Warner Bros. Pictures	Stephen Milburn Anderson (director/screenplay); Glenn Plummer, Carl Lumbly, Christian Coleman, Byron Keith Minns, Lexi D. Bigham, Vincent Craig Dupree, LaRita Shelby, Ivory Ocean, Vickilyn Reynolds, Tim DeZarn, Starletta Dupois	
S E P T E M B E R	25	Innocent Blood	Warner Bros. Pictures	John Landis (director); Michael Wolk (screenplay); Anne Parillaud, Robert Loggia, Anthony LaPaglia, Don Rickles, David Proval, Rocco Sisto, Chazz Palminteri, Kim Coates, Marshall Bell, Linnea Quigley, Tony Sirico, Tony Lip, Luis Guzmán, Angela Bassett, Leo Burmester, Rohn Thomas, Frank Oz, Tom Savini, Sam Raimi, Dario Argento, Yancey Arias, Ron Roth, Elaine Kagan, Vic Noto, Jerry Lyden	
S E P T E M B E R	25	The Last of the Mohicans	20th Century Fox / Morgan Creek Productions	Michael Mann (director/screenplay); Christopher Crowe (screenplay); Daniel Day-Lewis, Madeleine Stowe, Russell Means, Eric Schweig, Jodhi May, Steven Waddington, Wes Studi, Maurice Roeves, Patrice Chéreau, Dylan Baker, Edward Blatchford, Tracey Ellis, Terry Kinney, Sebastian Roché, Dennis Banks, Pete Postlethwaite, Colm Meaney, Benton Jennings, Jared Harris, Justin M. Rice, Mac Andrews	
S E P T E M B E R	25	Mr. Saturday Night	Columbia Pictures / Castle Rock Entertainment	Billy Crystal (director/screenplay); Billy Crystal, David Paymer, Julie Warner, Helen Hunt, Jerry Orbach, Ron Silver, Mary Mara, Jason Marsden, Michael Weiner, Larry Gelman, Will Jordan, Josh Byrne, Ben Diskin, Carl Ballantine, Slappy White, Conrad Janis, Tim Russ, Marc Shaiman, Miranda Garrison, Richard Kind, Jerry Lewis, Adam Goldberg, Lonnie Burr, Shadoe Stevens, Lowell Ganz, Babaloo Mandel, Gary Grossman, Jackie Gayle, Walton Goggins	
S E P T E M B E R	25	Roller Boogie (re-release)	United Artists / Compass International Pictures	Mark L. Lester (director); Barry Schneider (screenplay); Linda Blair, Jim Bray, Albert Insinnia, Jimmy Van Patten, Kimberly Beck, Stoney Jackson, Beverly Garland, Mark Goddard	

== October–December ==
Opening		Title	Production company	Cast and crew	Ref.
O C T O B E R	2	Glengarry Glen Ross	New Line Cinema	James Foley (director); David Mamet (screenplay); Al Pacino, Jack Lemmon, Alec Baldwin, Ed Harris, Alan Arkin, Kevin Spacey, Jonathan Pryce, Bruce Altman, Jude Ciccolella, Lori Tan Chinn, Neal Jones, Barry Rohrssen, Leigh French, George Cheung, Murphy Dunne, Julie Payne, Gregory Snegoff	
O C T O B E R	2	Hero	Columbia Pictures	Stephen Frears (director); Laura Ziskin, Alvin Sargent, David Webb Peoples (screenplay); Dustin Hoffman, Geena Davis, Andy García, Chevy Chase, Joan Cusack, Kevin J. O'Connor, Maury Chaykin, Stephen Tobolowsky, Christian Clemenson, Daniel Baldwin, Clea Lewis, Tom Arnold, Cady Huffman, James Madio, Kate Butler, Martin Starr, William Newman	
O C T O B E R	2	The Mighty Ducks	Walt Disney Pictures	Stephen Herek (director); Steven Brill (screenplay); Emilio Estevez, Joss Ackland, Lane Smith, Heidi Kling, Josef Sommer, Joshua Jackson, Elden Henson, Shaun Weiss, Brandon Adams, M. C. Gainey, Matt Doherty, J. D. Daniels, Aaron Schwartz, Garette Ratliff Henson, Marguerite Moreau, Vincent Larusso, Jussie Smollett, Danny Tamberelli, Jane Plank, Michael Ooms, Casey Graven, Hal Fort Atkinson III, Basil McRae, Mike Modano, John Beasley, Steven Brill, George Coe, Brock Pierce	
O C T O B E R	2	Mr. Baseball	Universal Pictures	Fred Schepisi (director); Gary Ross, Kevin Wade, Monte Merrick (screenplay); Tom Selleck, Ken Takakura, Aya Takanashi, Dennis Haysbert, Toshi Shioya, Nicholas Cascone, Kosuke Toyohara, Toshizo Fujiwara, Charles Fick, Leon Lee, Bradley "Animal" Lesley, Frank Thomas	
O C T O B E R	2	Of Mice and Men	Metro-Goldwyn-Mayer	Gary Sinise (director); Horton Foote (screenplay); John Malkovich, Gary Sinise, Ray Walston, Casey Siemaszko, Sherilyn Fenn, Noble Willingham, John Terry, Richard Riehle, Joe Morton, Mark Boone Junior, Moira Harris, Alexis Arquette	
O C T O B E R	4	Running Mates	HBO Pictures	Michael Lindsay-Hogg (director); Carole Eastman (screenplay); Diane Keaton, Ed Harris, Ed Begley Jr., Ben Masters, Robert Harper, Brandon Maggart, Russ Tamblyn, Stacy Keach Sr., Carrie Snow, Gregg Berger, Peter Tomarken, Edgar Small, Richard B. Livingston, Roy Soden, Flo Di Re, Kurt Knudson, Charity Rowland, Mookie Rubin	
O C T O B E R	9	1492: Conquest of Paradise	Paramount Pictures	Ridley Scott (director); Roselyne Bosch (screenplay); Gérard Depardieu, Armand Assante, Sigourney Weaver, Michael Wincott, Tchéky Karyo, Kevin Dunn, Frank Langella, Mark Margolis, Fernando Rey, Arnold Vosloo, Steven Waddington, Loren Dean, Ángela Molina, Juan Diego Botto, Achero Mañas, Kario Salem, John Heffernan, Fernando Guillén Cuervo, Jack Taylor, Billy L. Sullivan, José Luis Ferrer, Bercelio Moya, Fernando García Rimada, Albert Vidal, Isabel Prinz, Ángela Rosal, Silvia Montero	
O C T O B E R	9	A River Runs Through It	Columbia Pictures	Robert Redford (director); Norman Maclean, Richard Friedenberg (screenplay); Craig Sheffer, Brad Pitt, Tom Skerritt, Brenda Blethyn, Emily Lloyd, Stephen Shellen, Edie McClurg, Nicole Burdette, Michael Cudlitz, Susan Traylor, Joseph Gordon-Levitt, Vann Gravage, Arnold Richardson	
O C T O B E R	9	Under Siege	Warner Bros. Pictures	Andrew Davis (director); J. F. Lawton (screenplay); Steven Seagal, Tommy Lee Jones, Gary Busey, Erika Eleniak, Colm Meaney, Patrick O'Neal, Andy Romano, Dale Dye, Nick Mancuso, Damian Chapa, Tom Wood, Troy Evans, Dennis Lipscomb, Bernie Casey, Glenn Morshower, Raymond Cruz, George Kee Cheung, Kane Hodder	
O C T O B E R	16	Candyman	TriStar Pictures / Propaganda Films	Bernard Rose (director/screenplay); Virginia Madsen, Tony Todd, Xander Berkeley, Vanessa A. Williams, Kasi Lemmons, DeJuan Guy, Gilbert Lewis, Carolyn Lowery, Stanley DeSantis, Ted Raimi, Michael Culkin, Bernard Rose, Eric Edwards, Rusty Schwimmer, Latesha and Lanesha Martin	
O C T O B E R	16	Consenting Adults	Hollywood Pictures	Alan J. Pakula (director); Matthew Chapman (screenplay); Kevin Kline, Mary Elizabeth Mastrantonio, Kevin Spacey, Rebecca Miller, E. G. Marshall, Forest Whitaker, Kimberly McCullough	
O C T O B E R	16	Night and the City	20th Century Fox	Irwin Winkler (director); Richard Price (screenplay); Robert De Niro, Jessica Lange, Alan King, Jack Warden, Cliff Gorman, Eli Wallach, Barry Primus, Henry Milligan, Regis Philbin	
O C T O B E R	16	The Public Eye	Universal Pictures	Howard Franklin (director/screenplay); Joe Pesci, Barbara Hershey, Stanley Tucci, Jerry Adler, Dominic Chianese, Richard Riehle, Max Brooks, Richard Schiff, Christian Stolte, Timothy Hendrickson, Del Close	
O C T O B E R	23	Dr. Giggles	Universal Pictures / Largo Entertainment	Manny Coto (director/screenplay); Larry Drake, Holly Marie Combs, Cliff DeYoung, Glenn Quinn, Keith Diamond, Richard Bradford, Michelle Johnson, John Vickery, Nancy Fish, Doug E. Doug, William Dennis Hunt	
O C T O B E R	23	Frozen Assets	RKO Pictures	George T. Miller (director); Don Klein, Tom Kartozian (screenplay); Shelley Long, Corbin Bernsen, Larry Miller, Dody Goodman, Matt Clark	
O C T O B E R	23	Pure Country	Warner Bros. Pictures	Christopher Cain (director); Rex McGee (screenplay); George Strait, Lesley Ann Warren, Isabel Glasser, Kyle Chandler, John Doe, Rory Calhoun, Molly McClure	
O C T O B E R	23	Reservoir Dogs	Miramax Films	Quentin Tarantino (director/screenplay); Harvey Keitel, Tim Roth, Chris Penn, Steve Buscemi, Quentin Tarantino, Lawrence Tierney, Michael Madsen, Kirk Baltz, Steven Wright, Randy Brooks, Edward Bunker	
O C T O B E R	23	Zebrahead	Triumph Releasing Corporation	Anthony Drazan (director/screenplay); Michael Rapaport, N'Bushe Wright, Kevin Corrigan, Dan Ziskie, Jason Willinger, LZ Granderson, Ray Sharkey, Jon Seda, DeShonn Castle, Lois Bendler, Shula Van Buren, Shirley Bunyas, Martin Priest, Ron Johnson, Marsha Florence	
O C T O B E R	26	My New Gun	IRS Media	Stacy Cochran (director/screenplay); Diane Lane, James LeGros, Stephen Collins, Tess Harper, Bruce Altman, Maddie Corman, Bill Raymond, Suzzy Roche, Philip Seymour Hoffman, Patti Chambers, Stephen Pearlman	
O C T O B E R	30	Rampage	Miramax Films / De Laurentiis Entertainment Group	William Friedkin (director/screenplay); Michael Biehn, Alex McArthur, Nicholas Campbell, Deborah Van Valkenburgh, John Harkins, Art LaFleur, Billy "Green" Bush, Royce D. Applegate, Grace Zabriskie, Carlos Palomino, Roy London, Andy Romano, Patrick Cronin, Whitby Hertford, Joseph Whipp, Donald Hotton, Brenda Lilly, Roger Nolan, Rosalyn Marshall, Angelo Vitale, Paul Gaddoni	
O C T O B E R	30	There Goes the Neighborhood	Paramount Pictures	Bill Phillips (director/screenplay); Jeff Daniels, Catherine O'Hara, Héctor Elizondo, Rhea Perlman, Judith Ivey, Harris Yulin, Jonathan Banks, Dabney Coleman, Chazz Palminteri, Richard Portnow, Jeremy Piven, Heidi Zeigler, W. Morgan Sheppard	
N O V E M B E R	6	The Efficiency Expert	Miramax Films	Mark Joffe (director); Max Dann, Andrew Knight (screenplay); Anthony Hopkins, Ben Mendelsohn, Alwyn Kurts, Bruno Lawrence, Angela Punch McGregor, Russell Crowe, John Walton, Rebecca Rigg, Toni Collette, Daniel Wyllie, John Flaus, Gary Adams, Jeff Truman, Toni Lamond, Jill Murray	
N O V E M B E R	6	Intervista	Castle Hill Productions	Federico Fellini (director/screenplay); Gianfranco Angelucci (screenplay); Anita Ekberg, Marcello Mastroianni, Federico Fellini, Sergio Rubini, Antonella Ponziani, Lara Wendel, Antonio Cantafora, Christian Borromeo, Germana Dominici, Eva Grimaldi, Tonino Delli Colli, Danilo Donati, Sophie Hicks, Domiziano Arcangeli, Maurizio Mein, Paola Liguori, Nadia Ottaviani, Maria Teresa Battaglia, Roberta Carlucci, Umberto Conte, Lionello Pio Di Savoia, Adriana Facchetti, Ettore Geri, Alessandro Marino, Armando Marra, Mario Miyakawa, Francesca Reggiani, Patrizia Sacchi, Faustone Signoretti, Rolando De Santis, Gino Millozza, Delia D'Alberti, Stefano Corsi, Roberto Ceccacci, Piero Vivaldi, Clarita Gatto	
N O V E M B E R	6	Jennifer 8	Paramount Pictures	Bruce Robinson (director/screenplay); Andy García, Uma Thurman, John Malkovich, Lance Henriksen, Kathy Baker, Graham Beckel, Kevin Conway, Perry Lang, Nicholas Love, Thomas J. Hageboeck, Bob Gunton, Lenny Von Dohlen, Bryan Larkin, Stephen Piemonte II	
N O V E M B E R	6	Passenger 57	Warner Bros. Pictures	Kevin Hooks (director); David Loughery, Dan Gordon (screenplay); Wesley Snipes, Bruce Payne, Tom Sizemore, Alex Datcher, Bruce Greenwood, Elizabeth Hurley, Michael Horse, Marc Macaulay, Ernie Lively, Brett Rice	
N O V E M B E R	11	Traces of Red	The Samuel Goldwyn Company	Andy Wolk (director); Jim Piddock (screenplay); James Belushi, Lorraine Bracco, Tony Goldwyn, William Russ, Faye Grant, Michelle Joyner, Joe Lisi, Victoria Bass, Melanie Tomlin, Jim Piddock, Ed Amatrudo, Danny Kamin, Harriet Grinnell, Lindsay Jayde Sapp, Mario Ernesto Sánchez, Joe Hess, Will Knickerbocker, Edgar Allan Poe IV, Billy Garrigues, Katherine Culliver, Renate Schlesinger, Nick Xatzis	
N O V E M B E R	13	Bram Stoker's Dracula	Columbia Pictures / American Zoetrope	Francis Ford Coppola (director); James V. Hart (screenplay); Gary Oldman, Winona Ryder, Anthony Hopkins, Keanu Reeves, Richard E. Grant, Cary Elwes, Billy Campbell, Sadie Frost, Tom Waits, Monica Bellucci, Michaela Bercu, Florina Kendrick, Jay Robinson, Tatiana von Fürstenberg, Christina Fulton	
N O V E M B E R	13	Love Potion No. 9	20th Century Fox	Dale Launer (director/screenplay); Tate Donovan, Sandra Bullock, Anne Bancroft, Mary Mara, Dale Midkiff, Hillary B. Smith, Dylan Baker, Blake Clark, Bruce McCarty, Rebecca Staab, Adrian Paul, Ric Reitz	
N O V E M B E R	14	Flirting	Warner Bros. Pictures	John Duigan (director/screenplay); Noah Taylor, Thandie Newton, Nicole Kidman, Kym Wilson, Naomi Watts, Les Hill	
N O V E M B E R	18	Malcolm X	Warner Bros. Pictures / 40 Acres and a Mule Filmworks	Spike Lee (director/screenplay); Arnold Perl (screenplay); Denzel Washington, Angela Bassett, Albert Hall, Al Freeman Jr., Delroy Lindo, Spike Lee, Theresa Randle, Kate Vernon, Ernest Lee Thomas, Christopher Plummer, Lonette McKee, Tommy Hollis, Giancarlo Esposito, Wendell Pierce, Leonard L. Thomas, Leland Gantt, Roger Guenveur Smith, James McDaniel, Steve White, Veronica Webb, Jean-Claude La Marre, Debi Mazar, Karen Allen, Peter Boyle, David Patrick Kelly, Beatrice Winde, O. L. Duke, Phyllis Yvonne Stickney, Joe Seneca, LaTanya Richardson Jackson, Craig Wasson, Frances Foster, Shirley Stoler, Oran "Juice" Jones, George Guidall, Leonard Parker, Lizbeth MacKay, Mary Alice, Ed Herlihy, Karen Duffy, Walter Jones, George T. Odom, John David Washington, Annie Corley, Gareth Williams, Richard Schiff, Michael Imperioli, Elise Neal, John Sayles, Martin Donovan, Nicholas Turturro, William Fichtner, Tim Kelleher, Monty Ross, Terence Blanchard, Laurieann Gibson, Vincent D'Onofrio, Bobby Seale, Al Sharpton, William Kunstler, Nelson Mandela, Ossie Davis, Ralph Abernathy, Muhammed Ali, Ashanti, Tracy Chapman, Eugene "Bull" Connor, Bill Cosby, Angela Davis, James Farmer, Janet Jackson, Jesse Jackson, Magic Johnson, Michael Jordan, John F. Kennedy, Martin Luther King, Rodney King, Stacey Koon, Joe Louis, Malcolm X, Willie Mays, Peter Norman, Laurence Powell, Jackie Robinson, Betty Shabazz, Tommie Smith, George Wallace, Roy Wilkins, Andrew Young	
N O V E M B E R	20	Bad Lieutenant	Aries Films	Abel Ferrara (director); Zoë Lund, Paul Calderón (screenplay); Harvey Keitel, Victor Argo, Paul Calderon, Eddie Daniels, Bianca Hunter, Zoë Lund, Vincent Laresca, Frankie Thorn, Fernando Velez, Joseph Micheal Cruz, Paul Hipp, Frank Adonis, Anthony Ruggiero, Victoria Bastel	
N O V E M B E R	20	Home Alone 2: Lost in New York	20th Century Fox / Hughes Entertainment	Chris Columbus (director); John Hughes (screenplay); Macaulay Culkin, Joe Pesci, Daniel Stern, John Heard, Tim Curry, Brenda Fricker, Catherine O'Hara, Devin Ratray, Hillary Wolf, Maureen Elisabeth Shay, Michael C. Maronna, Gerry Bamman, Terrie Snell, Jedidiah Cohen, Kieran Culkin, Senta Moses, Daiana Campeanu, Anna Slotky, Eddie Bracken, Rob Schneider, Dana Ivey, Ralph Foody, Clare Hoak, Bob Eubanks, Rip Taylor, Jaye P. Morgan, Jimmie Walker, Ally Sheedy, Donald Trump, Leigh Zimmerman, Ron Canada	
N O V E M B E R	20	Samantha	Academy Entertainment Inc.	Stephen La Rocque (director/screenplay); John Golden (screenplay); Martha Plimpton, Dermot Mulroney, Héctor Elizondo, Mary Kay Place, Ione Skye	
N O V E M B E R	21	Stalin	HBO Pictures / MGM Television / Warner Bros. Television	Ivan Passer (director); Paul Monash (screenplay); Robert Duvall, Julia Ormond, Maximilian Schell, Jeroen Krabbé, Joan Plowright, Frank Finlay, Roshan Seth, Daniel Massey, András Bálint, John Bowe, Jim Carter, Murray Ewen, Stella Gonet, Ravil Isyanov, Colin Jeavons, Miriam Margoyles, Kevin McNally, Clive Merrison, Lisa Orgolini, Joanna Roth, Emil Wolk, Levani Uchaneischvili, Mátyás Usztics, Oleg Tabakov, Aleksandr Feklistov, Vladimir Gorushin, Olga Anokhina, Gulya Isyanov, Dora Dezseri, Robert Szilvasi, Natalya Kislitsyna, Vsevolod Larionov, Eugene Lazarev, Nikolai Lazarev, Irina Lazareva, Gene Ruby, Yelena Seropova, Stanislav Strelkov	
N O V E M B E R	25	Aladdin	Walt Disney Pictures	Ron Clements, John Musker (directors/screenplay); Ted Elliott, Terry Rossio (screenplay); Scott Weinger, Robin Williams, Linda Larkin, Jonathan Freeman, Frank Welker, Gilbert Gottfried, Douglas Seale, Brad Kane, Lea Salonga, Jim Cummings, Charlie Adler, Corey Burton, Jack Angel, Philip L. Clarke, Jennifer Darling, Debi Derryberry, Jerry Houser, Sherry Lynn, Patrick Pinney, Phil Proctor, Bruce Adler, Hal Smith, Mickie McGowan, Bruce Gooch, Vera Lockwood	
N O V E M B E R	25	The Bodyguard	Warner Bros. Pictures / Tig Productions	Mick Jackson (director); Lawrence Kasdan (screenplay); Kevin Costner, Whitney Houston, Gary Kemp, Bill Cobbs, Ralph Waite, Tomas Arana, Michele Lamar Richards, Mike Starr, Christopher Birt, DeVaughn Nixon, Gerry Bamman, Tony Pierce, Robert Wuhl, Richard Schiff, Chris Connelly, Debbie Reynolds, David Foster, Linda Thompson, Michael Garner, Charles Keating, Ethel Ayler, Sean Cheesman, Nathaniel Parker, Bert Remsen, Stephen Shellen, Joe Unger, Susan Traylor, John Tesh	
N O V E M B E R	25	The Crying Game	Miramax Films	Neil Jordan (director/screenplay); Stephen Rea, Miranda Richardson, Jaye Davidson, Forest Whitaker, Adrian Dunbar, Tony Slattery, Jim Broadbent, Birdy Sweeney, Ralph Brown	
D E C E M B E R	2	Damage	New Line Cinema	Louis Malle (director); David Hare (screenplay); Jeremy Irons, Juliette Binoche, Miranda Richardson, Rupert Graves, Ian Bannen, Peter Stormare, Gemma Clarke, Leslie Caron, Julian Fellowes, Tony Doyle, Ray Gravell, Susan Engel, David Thewlis, Benjamin Whitrow	
D E C E M B E R	4	The Distinguished Gentleman	Hollywood Pictures	Jonathan Lynn (director); Marty Kaplan, Jonathan Reynolds (screenplay); Eddie Murphy, Lane Smith, Sheryl Lee Ralph, Joe Don Baker, Victoria Rowell, Grant Shaud, Kevin McCarthy, Charles S. Dutton, Victor Rivers, Chi McBride, Sonny Jim Gaines, Noble Willingham, Gary Frank, Daniel Benzali, Cynthia Harris, James Garner, Doris Grau, Frances Foster, Mel Owens, Rosanna Huffman, Daniel Petrie Jr., Della Reese	
D E C E M B E R	11	A Few Good Men	Columbia Pictures / Castle Rock Entertainment	Rob Reiner (director); Aaron Sorkin (screenplay); Tom Cruise, Jack Nicholson, Demi Moore, Kevin Bacon, Kiefer Sutherland, Kevin Pollak, James Marshall, J. T. Walsh, Christopher Guest, J. A. Preston, Matt Craven, Wolfgang Bodison, Xander Berkeley, John M. Jackson, Noah Wyle, Cuba Gooding Jr., Joshua Malina, Aaron Sorkin, Ron Ostrow, Michael DeLorenzo, Cameron Thor, David Bowe, Harry Caesar	
D E C E M B E R	11	Forever Young	Warner Bros. Pictures / Icon Productions	Steve Miner (director); J. J. Abrams (screenplay); Mel Gibson, Jamie Lee Curtis, Elijah Wood, Isabel Glasser, George Wendt, Joe Morton, David Marshall Grant, Robert Hy Gorman, Michael Goorjian, Veronica Lauren, Art LaFleur, Eric Pierpoint, Richard Ryder, Walton Goggins, Amanda Foreman, Karla Tamburrelli, JD Cullum, Ava Lazar, Paul Ganus, Cody Burger, Joel McKinnon Miller, Mike Muscat, Millie Slavin, Nicolas Surovy, Michael Briggs	
D E C E M B E R	11	The Muppet Christmas Carol	Walt Disney Pictures / Jim Henson Productions	Brian Henson (director); Jerry Juhl (screenplay); Michael Caine, Steven Mackintosh, Meredith Braun, Robin Weaver, Jessica Fox, David Shaw Parker, Dave Goelz, Steve Whitmire, Jerry Nelson, Frank Oz, David Rudman, Karen Prell, Robert Tygner, William Todd-Jones, Don Austen	
D E C E M B E R	11	Passion Fish	Miramax Films	John Sayles (director/screenplay); Mary McDonnell, Alfre Woodard, Vondie Curtis-Hall, David Strathairn, Leo Burmester, Nora Dunn, Angela Bassett, Maggie Renzi, Lenore Banks, Will Mahoney, Michael Mantell, Marianne Muellerleile, Victoria Edwards, Amanda Carlin, Elaine West, Linda Castle, Leigh 'Little Queenie' Harris, Mary Portser, Tom Wright, Jennifer Gardner, Sheila Kelley, Nancy Mette, Shauntisa Willis, John Henry Redwood, Michael Laskin, John Sayles	
D E C E M B E R	12	Dead Ahead: The Exxon Valdez Disaster	HBO Showcase	Paul Seed (director); Michael Baker (screenplay); Christopher Lloyd, John Heard, Ron Frazier, Paul Guilfoyle, Bob Gunton, Mark Metcalf, David Morse, Remak Ramsay, Kenneth Welsh, Michael Murphy, Rip Torn, Bruce Gray, Lochlyn Munro, Frank C. Turner, Malcolm Stewart, Richard Sargent, Tom McBeath, Patricia Dahlquist, Don S. Davis, Gary Reineke, Eric Keenleyside, Bill Dow, Leslie Carlson, Jackson Davies, Timothy Webber, Michael Rogers	
D E C E M B E R	16	Used People	20th Century Fox / Largo Entertainment	Beeban Kidron (director); Todd Graff (screenplay); Shirley MacLaine, Kathy Bates, Jessica Tandy, Marcello Mastroianni, Marcia Gay Harden, Sylvia Sidney, Joe Pantoliano, Bob Dishy, Lee Wallace, Doris Roberts, Louis Guss, Helen Hanft	
D E C E M B E R	18	Leap of Faith	Paramount Pictures	Richard Pearce (director); Janus Cercone (screenplay); Steve Martin, Debra Winger, Lolita Davidovich, Liam Neeson, Lukas Haas, Albertina Walker, Meat Loaf, Philip Seymour Hoffman, M.C. Gainey, La Chanze, Delores Hall, Phyllis Somerville, Troy Evans, Edwin Hawkins, Ricky Dillard, Mary Jackson, Blue Deckert	
D E C E M B E R	18	Toys	20th Century Fox	Barry Levinson (director/screenplay); Valerie Curtin (screenplay); Robin Williams, Michael Gambon, Joan Cusack, Robin Wright, LL Cool J, Donald O'Connor, Arthur Malet, Jack Warden, Debi Mazar, Wendy Melvoin, Julio Oscar Mechoso, Jamie Foxx, Shelly Desai, Blake Clark, Art Metrano, Steve Park, Yeardley Smith, Ralph Tabakin	
D E C E M B E R	23	Indochine	Bac Films	Regis Wargnier (director/screenplay); Erik Orsenna, Louis Gardel, Catherine Cohen (screenplay); Catherine Deneuve, Vincent Pérez, Linh Dan Pham, Jean Yanne, Dominique Blanc, Henri Marteau, Carlo Brandt, Hubert Saint-Macary, Andrzej Seweryn, Thibault de Montalembert, Nhu Quynh	
D E C E M B E R	23	Scent of a Woman	Universal Pictures	Martin Brest (director); Bo Goldman (screenplay); Al Pacino, Chris O'Donnell, James Rebhorn, Gabrielle Anwar, Philip Seymour Hoffman, Bradley Whitford, Richard Venture, June Squibb, Frances Conroy, Rochelle Oliver, Nicholas Sadler, Todd Louiso, Ron Eldard	
D E C E M B E R	25	Chaplin	TriStar Pictures / Carolco Pictures	Richard Attenborough (director); William Boyd, Bryan Forbes, William Goldman (screenplay); Robert Downey Jr., Dan Aykroyd, Geraldine Chaplin, Kevin Dunn, Anthony Hopkins, Milla Jovovich, Moira Kelly, Kevin Kline, Diane Lane, Penelope Ann Miller, Paul Rhys, John Thaw, Marisa Tomei, Nancy Travis, James Woods, David Duchovny, Maria Pitillo, Matthew Cottle, Deborah Moore, Francesca Buller, Bill Paterson, Alan Ford, Andrée Bernard, David Gant, Malcolm Terris, Phil Brown, Charles Howerton, Benjamin Whitrow, Robert Stephens, Sean O'Bryan, Bradley Pierce, Norbert Weisser, Vicki Frederick, Gene Wolande, John Standing, Michael A. Goorjian, Michael Cade, Charles Chaplin, Jackie Coogan, Adolf Hitler, Jack Lemmon, Walter Matthau, Joseph McCarthy, Robert Peters, Joshua Seth	
D E C E M B E R	25	Hoffa	20th Century Fox	Danny DeVito (director); David Mamet (screenplay); Jack Nicholson, Danny DeVito, Armand Assante, J. T. Walsh, John C. Reilly, Kevin Anderson, Bruno Kirby, John P. Ryan, Frank Whaley, Natalia Nogulich, Nicholas Pryor, Robert Prosky, Paul Guilfoyle, Karen Young, Cliff Gorman, Don Brockett, Willy Rizzo, Louis Giambalvo, Gerry Becker, Shirley Prestia, Fred Scialla, Richard Schiff, Steve Witting, Philip Perlman, Peter Spellos, Tim Burton, Jon Favreau	
D E C E M B E R	25	Trespass	Universal Pictures	Walter Hill (director); Bob Gale, Robert Zemeckis (screenplay); Bill Paxton, Ice-T, William Sadler, Ice Cube, Art Evans, De'voreaux White, Bruce A. Young, Tommy 'Tiny' Lister Jr., Stoney Jackson	
D E C E M B E R	30	Lorenzo's Oil	Universal Pictures	George Miller (director); Nick Enright (screenplay); Nick Nolte, Susan Sarandon, Peter Ustinov, Zack O'Malley Greenburg, Kathleen Wilhoite, Gerry Bamman, Margo Martindale, James Rebhorn, Ann Hearn, Maduka Steady, Mary Wakio, Colin Ward, LaTanya Richardson, Jennifer Dundas, William Cameron, Peter Mackenzie, Laura Linney, E. G. Daily	

== See also ==
- List of 1992 box office number-one films in the United States
- 1992 in the United States
