= My Giant =

- Theatrical release poster
- Directed by: Michael Lehmann
- Screenplay by: David Seltzer
- Story by: Billy Crystal; David Seltzer
- Produced by: Billy Crystal
- Starring: Billy Crystal; Kathleen Quinlan; Joanna Pacuła; Gheorghe Mureșan
- Cinematography: Michael Coulter
- Edited by: Stephen Semel
- Music by: Marc Shaiman
- Production company: Castle Rock Entertainment
- Distributed by: Columbia Pictures (through Sony Pictures Releasing)
- Release date: April 10, 1998 (United States)
- Running time: 104 minutes
- Country: United States
- Budget: $20 million
- Box office: $8.1 million

My Giant is a 1998 American comedy-drama film directed by Michael Lehmann. The film stars Billy Crystal, who also produced and co-wrote the story for the film, and Romanian NBA player Gheorghe Mureșan in his debut film appearance. David Seltzer's script was inspired by Crystal's friendship with professional wrestler André the Giant, whom he had met during the filming of The Princess Bride. My Giant was released by Sony Pictures Releasing on April 10, 1998. The film received negative reviews from critics and was a box office bomb, grossing $8.1 million against a $20 million budget.

== Plot ==
A struggling talent agent, Sammy Kamin, travels to Romania on business after splitting up with his wife. After his young client Justin Allen fires him, Sammy crashes his car and is rescued, while unconscious, by an enormous Romanian man, named Max Zamfirescu, who is close to 8 feet (244 cm) tall.

Sammy thinks the rescuer is God, as he can only see Max's giant hands. When Sammy wakes up, he initially thinks he is in Heaven, but is confused to find a statue of Jesus next to his bed, as he was raised Jewish. He then realizes Max has brought him to a monastery, where he was raised after being placed for adoption by his parents because of his height.

Sammy sees potential stardom in Max, and attempts to broker his introduction into the movies. In doing so, he exploits Max's desire to visit a long-lost paramour, Lilliana Rotaru, in Gallup, New Mexico. First, Max obtains the role of a villain in a movie, but he is so drunk that he vomits on the protagonist, played by Sammy's former client Justin. However, the scene is included in the movie.

Sammy talks to Steven Seagal about including Max as a villain in one of his movies. At first, Seagal rejects him in favor of another actor, but he changes his opinion after listening to an extract of a Shakespearean play performed by Max.

Unfortunately, Max is soon diagnosed with heart disease which cannot be treated with a transplant because his heart is so big. The doctor tells Sammy that Max's lifespan is limited and he should spend his remaining time with family. Sammy locates Lilliana and tries to convince her to meet Max again but she rejects the invitation. Sammy then convinces his wife Serena to take the role of Lilliana. As Lilliana, she says that she appreciates Max's affection but she has married another man, thus allowing Max to find some closure over the matter. Afterwards, Sammy reconciles with Serena.

Although Max gets a three-picture deal and a TV series deal, Sammy persuades him to reconcile with his family instead of pursuing a career in show business. Max returns to Romania and meets his parents again. Sammy ends up watching Max's first filmed scene in a cinema with his family. Max dies soon afterwards, but he changed many people's lives forever.

== Cast ==
- Billy Crystal as Sammy Kamin
  - Eric Lloyd as Young Sammy Kamin
- Gheorghe Mureșan as Maximus "Max" Zamfirescu
- Kathleen Quinlan as Serena Kamin
- Joanna Pacuła as Lilliana Rotaru
- Zane Carney as Nick Kamin
- Dan Castellaneta as Partlow
- Steven Seagal as Himself
- Doris Roberts as Rose Kaminski
- Jere Burns as Weller
- Raymond O'Connor as Eddie
- Rider Strong as Justin Allen
- Lorna Luft as Joanne
- Harold Gould as Milt Kaminski
- Carl Ballantine as Rabbi
- Ajay Naidu as Hot Dog Vendor
- Estelle Harris as Myrna
- Philip Sterling as Uncle Nate
- Max Goldblatt as Jerry
- Michael Papajohn as Tough Guy #1
- Heather Thomas as Showgirl
- Rick Overton as Director
- Richard Portnow as Producer
- Nicki Micheaux as Jeannie
- Lawrence Pressman as Doctor
- Joss Ackland as Monsignor
- Verne Troyer as Wrestler

== Reception ==
=== Box office ===
My Giant grossed $8 million domestically against a $20 million budget.

=== Critical response ===
Roger Ebert stated: "The movie, which could have been a funny send-up of Hollywood talent requirements, gets distracted by subplots...after its promising start, My Giant isn't a comedy about an agent and a giant, so much as the heartwarming tale of a guy who learns to be a better family man."

CNN's Paul Tatara stated Billy Crystal "is Crystal throughout, and I still like him for it. Mureșan, on the other hand, is sweet, but, shall we say, a limited performer. He also speaks as if he's storing potatoes in his cheeks for the oncoming Romanian winter. He's not any good, but, then again, Harrison Ford would be hard pressed to pretend that he's 7-foot-7 (231 cm). My Giant would probably play better to children. There's an itty-bitty bit of swearing. Beware of sugar comas."

The review of the film's original VHS release from Entertainment Weekly was one of its few genuine praises, from critic David Everitt, describing the tape as "a watchable rental. Crystal's wisenheimer Long Island charm wears well, and Mureșan, the 7-foot-7 Washington Wizards center, is surprisingly endearing, especially when you can understand what he's saying. Watch for Steven Seagal's amusing cameo."

Lisa Alspector of the Chicago Reader reviewed the film positively and stated: "My Giant is exciting partly because it dares to get so close to [its] idea, even though it then pulls back." On Rotten Tomatoes, the film has an approval rating of 21% based on reviews from 28 critics.
