= Leah Lail =

American actress and real estate agent

- Born: Leah Dawn Lail; December 17, 1965 (age 60); Lexington, Kentucky, U.S.
- Education: University of Southern California
- Occupation: Actress
- Years active: 1990–2006
- Known for: V.I.P.; Heavyweights; Denial
- Spouse(s): Steven Brill; 1998–2000
- Website: www.leahlail.com

Leah Dawn Lail (born December 17, 1965) is a retired American actress, best known for her role as Kay Simmons the communications and systems expert on the syndicated television series V.I.P..

== Early life ==
Born and raised in Lexington, Kentucky, Lail is the younger of two daughters born to Linda Gayle (née Neet) and Robert Howard Lail. She attended Sayre School, Tates Creek High School, and the University of Southern California, graduating summa cum laude with degrees in German and theater.

== Career ==
She also guest starred in the television series Seinfeld; Empty Nest; Matlock; The Larry Sanders Show; ER; 7th Heaven; Diagnosis: Murder; Touched by an Angel; Providence; Yes, Dear; Without a Trace and Boston Legal, her last acting credit. Lail also had a recurring role as Debbie in the sitcom The Jackie Thomas Show, starring Tom Arnold. Her film credits include D2: The Mighty Ducks, Heavyweights, Late Last Night and Little Nicky. She also played the female lead in the film Denial, opposite Jonathan Silverman.

Lail has since retired from acting and now works as a real estate agent in Beverly Hills, California.

== Personal life ==
From at least February 1998 through November 2000, Lail was married to director Steven Brill, her director on Late Last Night and Little Nicky (2000).

== Filmography ==
Film
Year	Title	Role
1992	Body Waves	Stacy Curtis
1994	D2: The Mighty Ducks	Terry at Party
1995	Heavyweights	Julie
1998	Denial	Sophie
1998	My Engagement Party	Laura Salsburg
2000	Little Nicky	Christa

Television
Year	Title	Role	Notes
1990	They Came from Outer Space	Polly Peckham	Episode: "The Beauty Contest"
1991	She-Wolf of London	Melinda	Episode: "Heart Attack"
1992	The Amazing Live Sea Monkeys	Marilyn	
1992	Seinfeld	Stacy	Episode: "The Virgin"
1992–1993	The Jackie Thomas Show	Debbie	Recurring role
1993	Empty Nest	Melissa	Episode: "The Fracas in Vegas"
1994	Matlock	Tracey Riggins	Episodes: "The Kidnapping" (Parts 1 & 2)
1993–1994	The Larry Sanders Show	Margaret Dolan	Episodes: "Hank's Wedding" & "Hank's Divorce"
1994	Baby Brokers	Carly	Television film
1995	Get Smart	Jessica / Gretchen	Episode: "Wurst Enemies"
1995	Legend	Abigail Steele	Episode: "Legend on His President's Secret Service"
1996	Sisters	Christy Caldwell	Episode: "A Little Snag"
1996	The Single Guy	Renee	Episode: "Wedding"
1996	ER	Kara Nielsen	Episode: "The Healers"
1996	Boston Common	Anna	Episode: "Relationship of Fools"
1996	7th Heaven	Susan	Episode: "No Funerals and a Wedding"
1999	Late Last Night	Angel	Television film
1998–2002	V.I.P.	Kay Simmons	Regular role
2000–2001	Touched by an Angel	Kim; Candy Koppelman	Episodes: "Millennium" & "Hello, I Love You"
2001	Diagnosis: Murder	Grace Boyd	Episode: "Bachelor Fathers"
2002	Presidio Med	Beatrice	Episode: "When Approaching a Let-Go"
2002	Providence	(unknown)	Episodes: "Truth and Consequences" & "The Sound of Music"
2003	Yes, Dear	Debbie	Episode: "Savitsky's Tennis Club"
2002	Without a Trace	Corinne McCormick	Episode: "Life Rules"
2005	American Black Beauty	Marcie Lane	Television film
2006	Boston Legal	Annie Spotnick (uncredited)	Episode: "Fine Young Cannibal"

Video games
Year	Title	Role	Notes
1995	Wirehead	Laura	
