= Late Last Night (film) =

1999 American television film by Steven Brill

- DVD cover
- Genre: Comedy
- Written by: Steven Brill
- Directed by: Steven Brill
- Starring: Emilio Estevez; Steven Weber; Kelly Rowan; Katie Wright; Leah Lail; Lisa Robin Kelly; Reni Santoni; Marshall Bell
- Music by: Pray for Rain
- Country of origin: United States
- Original language: English

Production
- Executive producers: Todd King; Devesh Chetty; Sundip R. Shah
- Producers: Ash R. Shah; Jim Burke; Adam Del Deo
- Cinematography: Eliot Rockett
- Editor: Sam Citron
- Running time: 90 minutes
- Production company: Screenland Pictures

Original release
- Network: Starz
- Release: June 20, 1999

Late Last Night is a 1999 American comedy television film written and directed by Steven Brill. The film stars Emilio Estevez and Steven Weber, with Kelly Rowan, Katie Wright, Leah Lail, Lisa Robin Kelly, Reni Santoni and Marshall Bell in supporting roles. It premiered on Starz on June 20, 1999.

== Plot ==
It's Christmas, and Dan is an entertainment lawyer whose wife has recently left him. Dan decides to re-examine his life and find himself. Dan gets together with a mysterious friend named Jeff, who will do anything for Dan to have a good time.

Dan has an eventful night spent in bars, clubs, and parties with call girls and others. Dan narrative blends fantasy, reality and everything in between. By the end of the night, it's possible that Dan might find what is missing in his life.

== Cast ==
- Emilio Estevez as Dan
- Steven Weber as Jeff
- Kelly Rowan as Jill
- Leah Lail as Angel
- Lisa Robin Kelly as Tristan
- Marshall Bell as Bartender
- Reni Santoni as Drunk
- Bobby Edner as The Stranger Danger Kid
- John Carroll Lynch as Sgt. Van Wyck
- Catherine O'Hara as Shrink
- Katie Wright as Mia
