= Heavyweights =

1995 film by Steven Brill

- Theatrical release poster
- Directed by: Steven Brill
- Written by: Steven Brill; Judd Apatow
- Produced by: Roger Birnbaum; Joe Roth; Morgan Michael Fottrell; Charles J.D. Schlissel; Jack Giarraputo
- Starring: Tom McGowan; Aaron Schwartz; Shaun Weiss; Tom Hodges; Leah Lail; Paul Feig; Kenan Thompson; David Bowe; Max Goldblatt; Robert Zalkind; Patrick LaBrecque; Jeffrey Tambor; Jerry Stiller; Anne Meara; Ben Stiller
- Cinematography: Victor Hammer
- Edited by: Carroll Timothy O'Meara
- Music by: J. A. C. Redford
- Production companies: Walt Disney Pictures; Caravan Pictures
- Distributed by: Buena Vista Pictures Distribution
- Release date: February 17, 1995
- Running time: 97 minutes
- Country: United States
- Language: English
- Budget: $10 million
- Box office: $17.7 million

Heavyweights is a 1995 American comedy film directed by Steven Brill and written by Brill with Judd Apatow. It stars Tom McGowan, Aaron Schwartz, Shaun Weiss, Tom Hodges, Leah Lail, Paul Feig, Kenan Thompson, David Bowe, Max Goldblatt, Robert Zalkind, Patrick LaBrecque, Jeffrey Tambor, Jerry Stiller, Anne Meara, and Ben Stiller (in a dual role), and follows a fat camp for kids that is taken over by a fitness entrepreneur as its campers work to overthrow him.

The film was released by Buena Vista Pictures Distribution on February 17, 1995. It received mixed reviews from critics and was a box-office bomb, grossing $17.7 million on a $10 million budget. It found a following on home video and cable television airings and has since become a cult film.

== Plot ==
When school ends for the summer, Gerry Garner is told by his parents that they are sending him to Camp Hope, a weight loss camp for boys. Initially reluctant, Gerry meets enthusiastic camp counselor Pat Finley, and befriends the other campers, who have smuggled in enough junk food for the entire summer. The first night at Camp Hope brings the revelation that the original owners, the Bushkins, have declared bankruptcy and the camp has been bought by fitness entrepreneur Tony Perkis Jr., who plans to transform the camp’s weight loss program into a best-selling infomercial.

Tony replaces the camp’s beloved activities, including go-karts and “the Blob”, with a punishing exercise regimen. Pat is replaced by the strict new counselor Lars and the campers endure a painful softball game against their more athletic, over-competitive rivals Camp MVP. When Tony purges the cabins' hidden food caches, Camp Hope legend Joshua Birnbaun stands up for Gerry by taunting Tony and is sent home without a refund. Tony arranges a dance with the girls' summer camp named Camp Magnolia to humiliate the boys into losing weight, but counselors Tim Orford, Pat, and camp nurse Julie Belcher convince the boys to enjoy themselves together. Josh returns to Camp Hope revealing that his lawyer father has threatened to sue Tony for kicking his son out without a refund.

Gerry and his friends sneak into Tony's office in search of their confiscated snacks, and learn that Tony has intercepted all the campers’ letters to their families, including a letter that Gerry wrote to his grandmother. They discover a secret food stash used by most of the camp, leading them to gain weight, and Tony forces the boys on a 20-mile hike, preparing to endanger their lives for the sake of fitness. The boys trick Tony into falling into a pit and imprison him at camp in a makeshift cell, electrified with a bug zapper. With Pat, Julie, and Tim on their side, the campers take back control of Camp Hope, tying up Lars in the woods with Tony's other counselors, and celebrating with a binge eating bonfire party. Lars ultimately sides with the campers due to threats of deportation.

The next morning, Pat rallies the campers to take responsibility for themselves and start losing weight and they all start a healthier regimen while making Camp Hope fun again. The boys' parents arrive for visiting day and are shown a video documenting Tony's cruelty, which is interrupted by Tony, having escaped his cell. Exchanging blows with Gerry's father, he attempts a series of backflips but knocks himself out. As Tony is taken away, Tony Perkis Sr. arrives and promises to refund money to the parents but announces that the camp will be closed. The boys ask for the camp to stay open. Pat – with 18 years' experience and the support of Gerry and the others – agrees to assume responsibility for Camp Hope, which Tony Sr. allows.

Under Pat's leadership, the campers restore their favorite activities, and prepare to face Camp MVP in their annual competition. Camp MVP takes the lead in the first event, an obstacle course, but Camp Hope catches up in the second round, a test of knowledge. In the final go-kart race, Gerry wins the competition for Camp Hope. Demonstrating that having fun is more important than winning, Pat throws the trophy in the lake and seals his romance with Julie with a kiss. As Camp Hope celebrates their victory, Gerry thanks Pat for the best summer of his life.

During the credits, Pat, the campers, and Lars sing the "Camp Hope" song.

In a post-credits scene, Tony is now an unsuccessful door-to-door salesman selling healing crystals.

== Cast ==
- Ben Stiller as:
  - Tony Perkis Jr., a fitness entrepreneur who takes over Camp Hope.
  - Tony Perkis Sr., Tony Jr.'s father, and a Western Pennsylvanian lamp store guru, whose fortune his son used to buy and fund the camp.
- Aaron Schwartz as Gerry Garner, a boy who enrolls at Camp Hope.
- Tom McGowan as Pat Finley, a long-time counselor at Camp Hope.
- Shaun Weiss as Josh Birnbaum, a camper at Camp Hope.
- Tom Hodges as Lars, a foreign counselor who works for Tony.
- Leah Lail as Julie Belcher, Camp Hope's new camp nurse.
- Paul Feig as Tim Orford
- Kenan Thompson as Roy Murphy, a camper at Camp Hope.
- David Bowe as Chris Donnelly
- Max Goldblatt as Phillip Grubenov
- Robert Zalkind as Michael Simms
- Patrick La Brecque as Dawson
- Jeffrey Tambor as Maury Garner, the father of Gerry.
- Jerry Stiller as Harvey Bushkin, the original owner of Camp Hope.
- Anne Meara as Alice Bushkin, the original owner of Camp Hope and Harvey's wife.
- David Goldman as Nicholas Wales
- Joseph Wayne Miller as Samuel "Salami Sam" Dampier
- Cody Burger as Cody Farley
- Allen Covert as Kenny Parry, the cameraman.
- Tim Blake Nelson as Roger Johnson, Camp Hope's salesman.
- Nancy Ringham as Mrs. Garner, the mother of Gerry.
- Seth St. Laurent as Camp MVP Racer
- Bobby Fain as Camp MVP Pitcher
- Judd Apatow as Homer Schulz
- Lauren Michelle Hill as Josie, the angelic girl.
- Peter Berg as the chef (uncredited)

== Production ==
Heavyweights was filmed over the course of two months in Hendersonville, North Carolina at two separate camps, Camp Pinnacle and Camp Ton-A-Wandah. Director and co-writer Steven Brill has stated that Camp Hope was based on Camp Shane, a long-running weight loss camp for children in New York.

== Soundtrack ==
The film's original score was composed by J.A.C. Redford. A soundtrack was not released, but the film featured eleven songs:

Song	Written by	Performed by
"Closer to Free"	Sam Llanas and Kurt Neumann	BoDeans
"Le Freak"	Bernard Edwards and Nile Rodgers	Chic
"Saturday Night"	Bill Martin and Phil Coulter	The Bay City Rollers
"You Sexy Thing"	Errol Brown	Hot Chocolate
"Love Machine"	Warren Moore and William Griffin	The Miracles
"Hang Tough"	Allen Toussaint	Crescent City Gold
"Set the Wheels in Motion"	Barbara Keith	The Stone Coyotes
"I Want Candy"	Bert Berns, Robert Feldman, Richard Gottehrer, and Jerry Goldstein	Bow Wow Wow
"Blue Danube"	Johann Strauss	
"Thieving Magpies"	Gioachino Rossini	
"Camp Hope Concerto"	Paul Feig	Paul Feig and The Camp Hope Kids

== Reception ==
On review aggregator Rotten Tomatoes, the film holds an approval rating of 50% based on 10 reviews, with an average score of 5.4/10. On Metacritic, the film has a weighted average score of 42 out of 100 based on 16 critics, indicating "mixed or average" reviews. Audiences surveyed by CinemaScore gave the film a grade "A−" on an A+ to F scale.

According to Stephen Holden of The New York Times, "Heavyweights is really two movies in one, and they don't mesh. One movie is a no-holds-barred spoof of a Tony Little- or Susan Powter-style fitness merchant [...] The other movie is a conventional family comedy that pokes lighthearted fun at the chubby young campers." In a positive review, Hal Hinson of The Washington Post wrote, "Make no mistake about it, Disney's 'Heavyweights' is the best movie about calorically challenged pubescent boys at summer camp ever made. Bar none."

In 2012, on the release of the Blu-ray, critic Brian Ordorff gave the film a grade of "B" and wrote: "Time has been kind to the discarded fat camp movie, finding Heavyweights more digestible these days, after years spent processing the askew sense of humor shared by Apatow and Company."

Rapper MC Lars has stated he took his stage name from the character Lars in Heavyweights, a further example of the film’s cult legacy.

=== Box office ===
The film made $17.6 million at the box office and was not successful theatrically, though the film has garnered a cult following.

== Home media ==
Heavyweights was released on VHS on August 15, 1995, LaserDisc on February 20, 1996, and DVD on March 4, 2003. Heavyweights was released on Blu-ray on December 11, 2012. It was also included on Disney+ in November 2019.
