= Max Goldblatt =

American actor, writer and director (born 1983)

- Born: Max Oliver Goldblatt; January 29, 1983 (age 43); Los Angeles, United States
- Occupations: Actor, writer, director

Max Oliver Goldblatt (born January 29, 1983, in Los Angeles) is an American actor, writer and director. He graduated from Wesleyan University in 2005. He is the son of American Cinema Editor Mark Goldblatt.

== Filmmaker ==
Max is writer, editor and director of the 2005 short film Kinetoscope, a twisted horror fantasy movie.

Kinetoscope was an Official Selection at: Santa Barbara International Film Festival, Cinequest (San Jose), New Haven Film Festival, Boston Underground Film Festival, Winnipeg International Film Festival, Reel Jews Film Festival (New York), Rooftop Film Festival (Brooklyn), Film Independent's Spirit Awards/Los Angeles Film Festival's Cinema Lounge and the Northampton Independent Film Festival.

== Actor ==
Max Goldblatt is noted for his role of Phillip Grubenov in the 1995 film Heavyweights, about the adventures of teenagers attending an American 'fat camp.'

He had a side role in 1998's My Giant.

== Filmography ==
=== Film ===
- Heavyweights (1995) - Phillip Grubenov
- Bushwhacked (1995) - Barnhill
- Sticks and Stones (1996) - Book
- My Giant (1998) - Jerry
- 3000 Miles to Graceland (2001) - Impersonator No. 2
- Egg (2005, Short) - Bird Child No. 1
- Jettison Your Loved Ones (2005, Short) - Sam
- Death to the Tinman (2007, Short) - Narrator

=== Television ===
- The Good Life (1994) - Billy
