= Steven Brill (filmmaker) =

American film director, screenwriter, producer and actor

- Born: May 27, 1962 (age 64); Utica, New York, U.S.
- Occupations: Actor; film producer; director; screenwriter
- Years active: 1989–present
- Spouse(s): Leah Lail (1999–2000); Ruthanna Hopper

Steven Brill (born May 27, 1962) is an American actor, film producer, director, and screenwriter. He directed and co-wrote Little Nicky and directed Mr. Deeds, Without a Paddle, Heavyweights, and Drillbit Taylor. He has had cameo roles in all three Mighty Ducks movies, and appeared in The Wedding Singer, Mr. Deeds, and Knocked Up, although his role in the latter has been miscredited to Judd Apatow. He also appeared as the Barfly in Sex, Lies, and Videotape.

As a director, Brill was one of the central players (alongside Harvey Weinstein) in the 2007/2008 Fanboys reshoot/editing controversy.

== Education ==
Steven Brill attended high school (1976–1980) in Fort Lauderdale, Florida. Brill graduated from Boston University's Film School. There he studied with poet Derek Walcott and collaborated with Marc Maron on screenplays and standup comedy during a tumultuous formative period discussed on the 500th episode of WTF with Marc Maron.

== Filmography ==
Year	Title	Director	Writer	Note
1992	The Mighty Ducks	No	Yes	
1994	D2: The Mighty Ducks	No	Yes	
1995	Heavyweights	Yes	Yes	Directorial Debut
1996	D3: The Mighty Ducks	No	Yes	
2000	Ready to Rumble	No	Yes	
2000	Little Nicky	Yes	Yes	Nominated- Golden Raspberry Award for Worst Director; Nominated- Golden Raspberry Award for Worst Screenplay
2002	Mr. Deeds	Yes	No	
2004	Without a Paddle	Yes	No	
2008	Drillbit Taylor	Yes	No	
2013	Movie 43	Yes	No	Segment "The Thread"; Golden Raspberry Award for Worst Director
2014	Walk of Shame	Yes	Yes	
2016	The Do-Over	Yes	No	
2017	Sandy Wexler	Yes	No	
2018	Adam Sandler: 100% Fresh	Yes	No	
2020	Hubie Halloween	Yes	No	

TV movies

Year	Title	Director	Writer
1999	Late Last Night	Yes	Yes
2007	The Weekend	Yes	No

=== Acting roles ===
Year	Title	Role
1989	Sex, Lies, and Videotape	Barfly
1989	Going Overboard	Priest
1990	Genuine Risk	Jimmy
1990	Postcards from the Edge	Assistant Director
1990	Edward Scissorhands	Dishwasher Man
1990	Almost an Angel	2nd Male Teller
1991	Dead Silence	Tommy
	Batman Returns	Gothamite No. 1
	The Mighty Ducks	Frank Huddy
	The Opposite Sex and How to Live with Them	George/French TV Announcer
1993	Aspen Extreme	Waiter
1994	When a Man Loves a Woman	Madras Tie Guy
1994	D2: The Mighty Ducks	Celebrity at Party
1994	Don't Do It	Waiter/Phone Sex
1995	French Exit	Ben
1996	D3: The Mighty Ducks	Arcade Attendant
1998	The Wedding Singer	Glenn's Buddy
1999	Big Daddy	Castellucci
2001	Joe Dirt	Cop at Crime Scene
2002	Mr. Deeds	Violin Player (uncredited cameo)
2007	Knocked Up	Ben's Boss
2008	Drillbit Taylor	Doctor
