= Shaun Weiss =

American actor and comedian (born 1978)

Shaun Herman Weiss
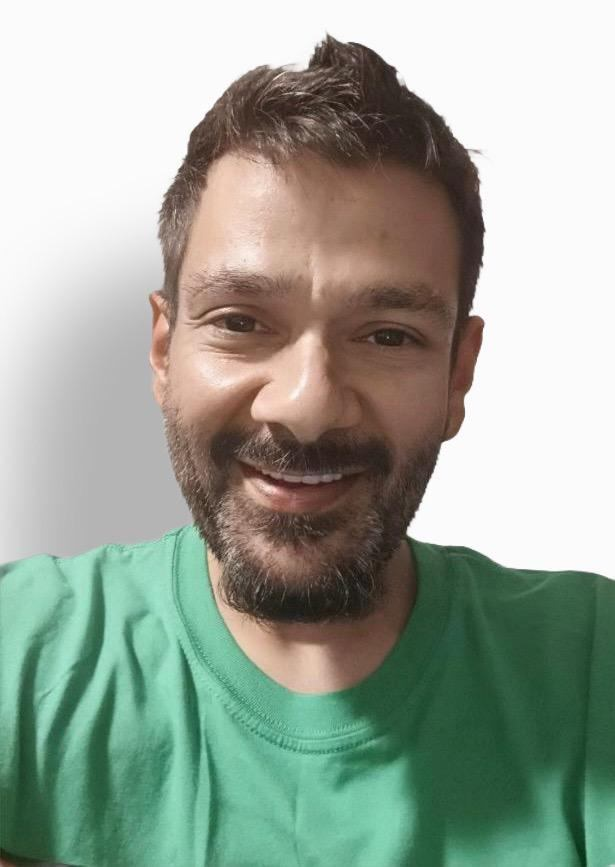
- Weiss in 2022
- Born: August 27, 1978 (age 47); Montvale, New Jersey, U.S.
- Occupations: Actor; comedian
- Years active: 1985–present

Shaun Herman Weiss (born August 27, 1978) is an American actor and stand-up comedian known for his roles in The Mighty Ducks movies and in 1995 film Heavyweights.

== Early life ==
Weiss was born and raised in Montvale, New Jersey to a Jewish family. He attended Pascack Hills High School.

== Career ==
Weiss started his acting career as Elvis on Pee-wee's Playhouse. but his breakout role came when he earned the part of Greg Goldberg in The Mighty Ducks films. Weiss was originally supposed to play Atuk the Eskimo in the first Mighty Ducks movie and had one line, but his role was expanded.

After the first two Mighty Ducks movies, he appeared as Josh Birnbaum in the Disney film Heavyweights. He also appeared in a recurring role as peripheral freak & fellow bandmate "Sean" on NBC's Freaks and Geeks (1999-2000) alongside James Franco, Seth Rogen, and Jason Segel, as well as cameo appearances on The King of Queens. He appeared in commercials for Captain Morgan, Castrol, Verizon Communications, and Mobile ESPN.

Weiss appeared in the movie Drillbit Taylor, making an appearance as the school bus driver around the beginning of the film. In 2022, it was announced that he would appear in the film Jesus Revolution, his first film in 14 years. On April 29, 2022, Weiss opened for Russell Peters at Oxnard Levity Live Improv. In 2023, he introduced his own website, shaunweiss.com.

== Personal life ==
In July 2017, Weiss was sentenced to 150 days in the Los Angeles County Jail for petty theft. He served just 12 days in jail due to overcrowding. Five days after his release, Weiss was arrested on August 2, 2017 for possession of a controlled substance (methamphetamine) in Burbank, California and was sentenced to 90 days in jail.

On August 3, 2018, Weiss was arrested for public intoxication in Oroville, California. Following that arrest, he declared that he was entering drug rehabilitation. Weiss was arrested on suspicion of burglary and being under the influence of methamphetamine on January 26, 2020 in Marysville, California after breaking into someone's garage.

In January 2022, Weiss graduated from drug court and celebrated two years of sobriety. A GoFundMe was set up for his recovery and he also went through dental restoration. As of 2023, Weiss works as a career coach with addiction treatment center Quest 2 Recovery in Quartz Hill, California.

In December 2024, he announced he and his girlfriend were expecting a child. In 2025, they announced she had a miscarriage.

In December 2025, he publicly offered to help fellow child actor Tylor Chase by announcing via an Instagram post that he had secured a bed for Tylor at a detox facility and long-term treatment at Eleven 11 Recovery in San Clemente, California. He noted that Chase still needed to be located and agree to accept help.

== Filmography ==
Year	Title	Role	Notes
1986	Pee-wee's Playhouse	Elvis	TV series; 3 episodes
1988	Charles in Charge	Max	TV series; 1 episode
1988	Webster	Herbert	TV series; 1 episode
1989	Empty Nest	Little Boy	TV series; 1 episode
1989	The Cosby Show	Boy #2	TV series; 1 episode
1992	Here and Now	William	TV series
1992	The Mighty Ducks	Greg Goldberg	
1994	D2: The Mighty Ducks	Greg Goldberg	
1995	Crazy for a Kiss	Mike Kinross	TV movie
1995	Heavyweights	Josh Burnbalm	
1996	Sabrina, the Teenage Witch	Male Student	TV series; pilot episode
1996	Saved by the Bell: The New Class	Hiram	TV series; 1 episode
1996	D3: The Mighty Ducks	Greg Goldberg	
1996–1997	Mr. Rhodes	Jake	TV series; 6 episodes
1997	The Tony Danza Show	Stuey Mandelker	TV series
1998	Boy Meets World	Louie	TV series; 2 episodes
1998	The King of Queens	Teenager	TV series
1999	The King of Queens	Albert "Tito" Blott	TV series
1999	Family Law	Wally French	TV series; 1 episode
1999	Undressed	Pete	TV series
1999–2000	Freaks and Geeks	Sean	TV series; 4 episodes
2000	Rave	Lazy	
2001	City Guys	Delivery Guy	TV series; 4 episodes
2002	Pumpkin	Randy Suskind	
2002	Pack of Dogs	Stu	Short film
2003	The King of Queens	Store Clerk	TV series; uncredited
2005	Suits on the Loose	Elder Talbot	
2005	Las Vegas	Albert	TV series; 1 episode
2007	Crossing Jordan	Brian Osguld	TV series; 1 episode
2008	Drillbit Taylor	Bus Driver	
2023	Jesus Revolution	Vietnam Vet	
2025	Deformelody: An American Nightmare	Freddy	Feature Film
