= Joseph Wayne Miller =

American actor (1981–2018)

- Born: Joseph Wayne Miller; December 18, 1981; Park Ridge, Illinois, U.S.
- Died: January 9, 2018 (aged 36); Chicago, Illinois, U.S.
- Occupation: Actor
- Years active: 1991–1995

Joseph Wayne Miller (Park Ridge, Illinois, December 18, 1981 - Chicago, January 9, 2018) was an American actor, known for his appearance in the film Heavyweights where he played Salami Sam.

He died in his sleep on January 9, 2018. He was 36 years of age when he died, and his mother said he had sleep apnea.

== Filmography ==
- Folks! (1992) – Jerry, Jon's nephew
- Heavyweights (1995) – Salami Sam
