= Marianne Hettinger =

German actress

- Citizenship: Germany, USA
- Occupation(s): film director, writer, actress, and dancer
- Awards: Best Director at the Detroit Independent Film Festival, 2010

Marianne Hettinger is a German-American film director, writer, actress, and dancer.

Having come to New York from Germany at the age of 19 with only $800 in her pocket, Marianne Hettinger had to learn how to make it on her own in The Big Apple. Being a filmmaker, actress, and dancer, Hettinger has had the chance to meet some interesting people, both famous and not so famous, and as a member of the National Board of Review, had the privilege to interview actors and directors like Dustin Hoffman, Neil Jordan, Terrence Howard, Glen Hansard and Jodie Foster. All of those experiences led her to start up a new video talk show, "Hallo New York", in 2013 that pays tribute to both her home country and the city she now calls home. Some of the initial interviews include German singer/actress Ute Lemper, and former CEO of CDV Software, Germany's biggest computer and videogame company, Wolfgang Gaebler.

She wrote, produced, directed and acted in her first feature film Mango Tango (2009), which won her "Best Director" at the Detroit Independent Film Festival in 2010. and was screened at the "Celebrate Tango Festival" in New York City 2010. She was nominated in 2010 for the Young Generation Award at the Fünf Seen Film Festival in Munich.

Hettinger married Olympic figure skater and world champion Norbert Schramm in 2011 and divorced him in 2012 citing irreconcilable differences. The couple has starred together in Hettinger's movie "Saint Vitus Dance", which could be seen at film festivals all over the world. They were guests of honor at the German-American Steuben parade in New York City in 2011.

2012 Hettinger's two short films, Saint Vitus Dance and Strad For Lunch premiered at the Liliom Theater in Augsburg, Germany.

2013 Hettinger developed her own talk series, produced by vidFame LLC, "Hallo New York". Hallo New York' celebrates famous and non-famous fascinating New Yorkers who are living their dream, in conversation with host Marianne Hettinger, in her studio on the Upper West Side, Manhattan.

As a dancer Marianne Hettinger performed with the National Symphony Orchestra at the Kennedy Center in Washington, D.C., with the Indianapolis Symphony Orchestra, with the Baltimore Symphony Orchestra and the Toronto Symphony Orchestra.

She performed a Salsa with Antonio Banderas on the Late Show with David Letterman and was invited back on several occasions.

As an actress, she played a principal role in Tim Robbins' "The Cradle Will Rock", the independent feature "My Best Friend's Wife" and played Tom Berenger's wife's character "Claire" in the 2009 film "Breaking Point".

Ms. Hettinger is a member of the Film Fatales, a community of women feature film and television directors. Ms. Hettinger's 2nd feature film, "Prince Harming", was selected as Semi-Finalist by the Moondance International Film Festival 2018.
