= Thomas J. Hageboeck =

American actor

- Born: July 20, 1945; Baltimore, Maryland, U.S.
- Died: April 4, 1996 (aged 50); San Francisco, California, U.S.
- Other names: T.J. Hageboeck
- Occupation: Actor
- Years active: 1984–1996

Thomas J. Hageboeck (July 20, 1945 – April 4, 1996) was an American film and television actor, best known for playing characters involved in law enforcement.

== Life and career ==
Hageboeck was born in Baltimore, Maryland. He attended Chesapeake High School and after the University of Maryland. In 1966, Hageboeck served in the United States Marine Corps during the Vietnam War era.

In 1984, Hageboeck made his first film appearance, in the Oscar-nominated film Beverly Hills Cop, as a Maitland bodyguard. Four years later, he appeared as Sergeant Gooch in the action comedy film, Midnight Run, which starred Robert De Niro. In 1989, Hageboeck made his first television appearance in Alien Nation in the episode "Fifteen with Wanda" as the Officer. In 1990, he appeared in the film Vietnam, Texas as the policeman. From 1990 to 1996, Hageboeck appeared in numerous films such as Jennifer Eight in 1992, Double Jeopardy also in 1992, Come Die with Me: A Mickey Spillane's Mike Hammer Mystery in 1994, Serial Killer in 1995, and last but not least in The Rock. Hageboeck died two months prior to The Rock's film release. He died on April 4, 1996, at age 50 in San Francisco, California.

== Filmography ==
Year	Title	Role	Notes
1984	Beverly Hills Cop	Maitland Bodyguard	
1988	Midnight Run	Sergeant Gooch	
1989	Alien Nation	Officer	1 episode "Fifteen with Wanda"
1990	Vietnam, Texas	Policeman	
1992	Jennifer Eight	Max	
1992	Double Jeopardy	Cop #1	TV movie
1994	Come Die with Me: A Mickey Spillane's Mike Hammer Mystery	Motor Cop	TV movie
1995	Serial Killer	Griff	TV movie
1996	The Rock	FBI Agent Cord	(final film role)
