= The Sandlot (franchise) =

1993 American film series

- Official franchise logo, as released in 1993.
- Based on: Original characters created by David Mickey Evans; Robert Gunter
- Distributed by: 20th Century Fox
- Country: United States
- Language: English
- Box office: $70,483,924 (2 films)

The Sandlot franchise consists of American coming-of-age sport-comedy installments including one theatrical film, and two straight-to-home video sequel films. The plot centers around preadolescent baseball fans, and their comedic adventures growing up as neighborhood friends. The first film was met with mixed-to-positive critical reception, while it was a financial success. Spawning a franchise, it has since been revered as a cult classic movie.

The franchise is set to continue with a prequel film, planned for a theatrical release. A legacy sequel series for Disney+ was in development but was later canceled in 2023.

== Films ==
Film	U.S. release date	Directed by	Screenplay by	Produced by
The Sandlot	April 7, 1993	David Mickey Evans	David Mickey Evans & William S. Gilmore	Dale De La Torre and William S. Gilmore
The Sandlot 2	May 3, 2005	David Mickey Evans	David Mickey Evans	David Bixler
The Sandlot: Heading Home	May 1, 2007	William Dear	Keith Mitchell & Allie Dvorin	Jon Kuyper
Untitled prequel	TBA	TBA	David Mickey Evans & Austin Reynolds	Colin Greten and Daria Cercek

=== The Sandlot (1993) ===
In 1962 America, Scott "Scotty" Smalls moves to a new neighborhood with his mother and stepfather. Scotty struggles to make new friends. Eventually he follows a group of local boys to the small baseball diamond that they affectionately call "The Sandlot", and watches them play an improvised ballgame. As the majority of the gang at first picks on him, the star player of the team named Benjamin "Benny" Franklin Rodgriguez invites him to join them. All together they quickly learn that his sports skills are severely lacking. Together, they have pre-teen coming of age experiences and share comical incidents.

One day when the team wants to play baseball, but do not have all of the necessary equipment, Scotty volunteers his stepdad's collector's item prized ball. When Scotty immediately hits a home run into the fenced-in yard of Mr. Mertle next door, Scotty goes to retrieve it before his friends panickingly stop him from doing so. Together they tell him he will never get it back, explaining the legend of "The Beast" that lives there. Hopeless and helpless, Scotty exclaims that it was signed by George "Babe" Ruth Jr., the group of friends devise a plan to get the legendary ball back before Scotty's stepdad notices it is missing.

=== The Sandlot 2 (2005) ===
In 1972 America, a new gang of young baseball-fanatics spend their free time at the Sandlot. One day they decide to try something different by launching an authentic NASA model rocket that belongs to one of their parents. When the object accidentally lands in the neighboring cluttered yard belonging to Mr. Mertle, the group of friends must conquer their fears and return the rocket before it's realized to be missing. Together they seek to outsmart the local folklore of the neighbor's dangerous pet that they call "The Great Fear".

=== The Sandlot: Heading Home (2007) ===
Tommy "Santa" Santorelli is a Major League Baseball star for the Los Angeles Dodgers, whose hot streak and impressive stats have caused an increase in his egotistical nature. During a game, Tommy steps up to the plate intending to hit another home run. Instead, a speeding fastball beams him in the head, knocking him out. Waking up, Tommy finds that his conscious-self has inexplicably been transported back in time to 1976 in his preadolescent age, when he first discovered his love for baseball with his friends and coaches (Benny and Squints) at The Sandlot. Re-living his early memories of the sport, causes a change within him and reminds him of why he loves the game.

=== Future ===
In 2018, a prequel film was revealed to be in development. David Mickey Evans serves as co-writer with Austin Reynolds. The plot takes place in the 1950s. Colin Greten and Daria Cercek will serve as producers for the project.

== Television ==
In April 2019, a sequel television series was announced to be in development as a Disney+ exclusive streaming show. David Mickey Evans was set to serve as creator, screenwriter, executive producer, and showrunner for the series. Each of the original cast members was confirmed to reprise their roles from the first film. The series was going to take place during the 1980s with each of the original characters, now in their 30's, coaching their collective children. In November 2023, the series was cancelled due to the lengthy SAG-AFTRA strike.

== Main cast and characters ==
List indicators

This section includes characters who will appear or have appeared in more than two films in the series.

- An empty grey cell indicates the character was not in the film, or that the character's official presence has not yet been confirmed.
- ^{O} indicates an older version of the character.
- ^{V} indicates a voice-only role.

Character	Film			
Character	The Sandlot	The Sandlot 2	The Sandlot: Heading Home	Untitled prequel
Principal cast
Scott "Scotty" Smalls	Tom Guiry David Mickey Evans^{O}^{V} Arliss Howard^{O}			
Benjamin "Benny the Jet" Rodriguez	Mike Vitar Pablo Vitar^{O}		Danny Nucci	
Hamilton "Ham" Porter	Patrick Renna			
Michael "Squints" Palledorous	Chauncey Leopardi		Chauncey Leopardi	
Alan "Yeah-Yeah" McClennan	Marty York			
Kenny DeNunez	Brandon Quintin Adams			
Bertram Grover Weeks	Grant Gelt			
Timothy "Timmy" Timmons	Victor di Mattia			
Tommy "Repeat" Timmons	Shane Obedzinski			
Mr. Mertle	James Earl Jones	James Earl Jones		
John "Johnnie" Smalls		James Willson David Mickey Evans^{O}^{V}		
David "Rocket" Durango		Max Lloyd-Jones		
Hayley Goodfairer		Samantha Burton		
Mac McKing		Brett Kelly		
Saul Samuelson		Cole Evan Weiss		
Tarquell		Neilen Benvegnu		
Sammy "Fingers" Samuelson		Sean Berdy		
Singleton		Reece Thompson		
Tommy "Santa" Santorelli			Keanu Pires Luke Perry^{O}	
Quincy "Q" Washington			Meschach Peters Chris Shields^{O}	
Ryan			Cainan Wiebe Dean Hinchley^{O}	
Two-Ton			Brandon Olds	
Timber			Kai James	
Wings McKay			Ryan Drescher	
D.P.			Cole Heppell	
Rolando "Roll" Alvarez			Renzo Carbonel	
Matt "Wok" Wakamoto			Samuel Patrick	
Supporting cast
Mrs. Smalls	Karen Allen			
Bill	Denis Leary			
Wendy Peffercorn	Marley Shelton			
George "Babe" Ruth, Jr.	Art LaFleur			
Mr. Goodfairer		Greg Germann		
Mrs. Goodfairer		Teryl Rothery		
Judy Santorelli			Lelia Johnson	
Sara Santorelli			Sarah Deakins	
Earl "E.J." Needman, Jr.			Alexander Ludwig	
Earl Needman			Paul Jarrett	

== Additional crew and production details ==
Film	Crew/Detail					
Film	Composer	Cinematographer	Editor	Production companies	Distributing company	Running time
The Sandlot	David Newman	Anthony B. Richmond	Michael A. Stevenson	20th Century Fox, Island World	Twentieth Century Fox	1hr 41mins
The Sandlot 2	Laura Karpman	David Pelletier	Harry Keramidas	20th Century Fox Home Entertainment LLC, David Evans Pictures	20th Century Fox Home Entertainment	1hr 37mins
The Sandlot: Heading Home	Kendall Marsh	Pascal Provost	Chris Conlee	20th Century Fox Home Entertainment	20th Century Fox Home Entertainment	1hr 36mins
Untitled prequel film	TBA	TBA	TBA	20th Century Fox, 20th Century Studios, Walt Disney Studios	Walt Disney Studios Motion Pictures	TBA

== Reception ==
=== Box office and financial performance ===
Film	Box office gross			Box office ranking		Video sales gross	Worldwide sales total	Budget	Worldwide net income	Ref.
Film	North America	Other territories	Worldwide	All time North America	All time worldwide	North America	Worldwide sales total	Budget	Worldwide net income	Ref.
The Sandlot	$32,434,0006	$1,398,307	$33,832,313	#2,638	#3,744	$34,237,307	$68,069,620	$7,000,000	$61,069,620	
The Sandlot 2	—N/a	—N/a	—N/a	—N/a	—N/a	Information not available	Information not available	Information not available	Information not available	
The Sandlot: Heading Home	—N/a	—N/a	—N/a	—N/a	—N/a	$2,414,304	$2,414,304	Information not available	<$2,414,304	
Untitled prequel								TBA		
Totals	$32,434,006	$1,398,307	$33,832,313	x̅ #660	x̅ #936	$36,651,611	$70,483,924	>$7,000,000	≤$63,483,924	

=== Critical and public response ===
Film	Rotten Tomatoes	Metacritic	CinemaScore
The Sandlot	63% (56 reviews)	55/100 (27 reviews)	B+
The Sandlot 2	40% (5 reviews)	—N/a	—N/a
The Sandlot: Heading Home	—N/a (3 reviews)	—N/a	—N/a
