= Sandlot =

Sandlot may refer to:

- The Sandlot, a 1993 film about young baseball players, and its sequels
  - The Sandlot 2, a 2005 film
  - The Sandlot: Heading Home, a 2007 film
- Sandlot (company), a Japanese game developer
- Sandlot Games, developer of Cake Mania
- Sandlot Observatory (H36) in Scranton, Kansas, US
- Sandlot ball, ball game that generally follows the basic rules of baseball
