= Dangerous Woman (disambiguation) =

Dangerous Woman is a 2016 album by Ariana Grande.

Dangerous Woman or Dangerous Women may also refer to:

== Art and literature ==
- A Dangerous Woman, 1910 novel by Australian-born English writer Effie Adelaide Rowlands
- "A Dangerous Woman", 1957 American short story by James T. Farrell
- A Dangerous Woman, 1991 American novel by Mary McGarry Morris
- Dangerous Women (anthology), 2013 American science fiction/fantasy collection
- A Dangerous Woman: Subversion & Surrealism in the Art of Honoré Sharrer, 2017–18 American art exhibition

== Film and TV ==
- A Dangerous Woman (1929 film), an American drama
- A Dangerous Woman (1976 film), a 1976 South Korean film with Baek Il-seob
- Dangerous Women (1989 film), an Italian drama
- A Dangerous Woman (1993 film), an American romantic drama
- Dangerous Women (American TV series), an American and British syndicated soap opera
- The Dangerous Woman, character portrayed by Virginia Madsen in the 2006 film A Prairie Home Companion
- Dangerous Woman (South Korean TV series), 2011 South Korean soap opera also known as Dangerous Women
- A Dangerous Woman, 2014 South Korean short film; winner of the Mise-en-scène Short Film Festival's Ollehtv Audience Award
- Killing Car, 1993 French revenge thriller, also known as Femme dangereuse (Dangerous Woman)

== Music ==
- "Dangerous Woman", 1959 single by American blues singer Junior Parker
- "Dangerous Woman", song from 1967 American film Trunk to Cairo
- "Dangerous Woman", song by American rock band House of Lords from the 2008 album Anthology
- "Dangerous Woman" (song), 2016 single by Ariana Grande from same-named album
- Dangerous Woman Tour, Grande's 2017 international tour in support of her 3rd studio album of the same name
