= Yonkers Joe =

- Promotional poster for Yonkers Joe
- Directed by: Robert Celestino
- Written by: Robert Celestino
- Produced by: Trent Othick; John Gaughan; Phil Ivey; Matt Othick; Chazz Palminteri
- Starring: Chazz Palminteri; Christine Lahti; Tom Guiry; Michael Lerner; Linus Roache
- Cinematography: Michael Fimognari
- Edited by: Gary Friedman; Jim Makiej
- Music by: Chris Hajian
- Distributed by: Magnolia Pictures
- Release date: April 2008 (Tribeca Film Festival)
- Running time: 101 minutes
- Country: United States
- Language: English
- Box office: $8,286

Yonkers Joe is a 2008 American drama film directed by Robert Celestino and starring Chazz Palminteri, Christine Lahti, Tom Guiry, Michael Lerner and Linus Roache. It debuted at the 2008 Tribeca Film Festival.

== Plot ==
Joe (Palminteri) is a small-time con-man and dice-hustler who works with a group of men with similar interests. They shave cards and dice, doing small-time cons at card games and union picnics. He's in a long-term relationship with Janice (Lahti) and has a son with Down syndrome, Joe Jr. (Guiry).

Joe finds out that his son must leave his residential care facility due to age. Joe Jr. has difficulty controlling his anger. He uses profanity and gets into fights. Thus, the residential facility is hesitant to recommend him to the group home for adults and Joe must take his son home, at least for a few weeks. Joe has been looking to make a bigger score, and he begins to hope that such a score could enable him to get his son into the group home. Sure that he could not care for his son, he begins work putting together a scam in Vegas.

During this time, the film shows that Joe's crew are affectionate towards Joe Jr., often more so than Joe himself. Joe Jr. also strikes up a friendship with Janice. When Stanley (Lerner) finds some men who will front Joe and the crew the cash, plans are laid for a trip to Vegas in the hope of scoring big. Tensions remain between Joe and Joe Jr., but they all travel to Vegas to find a way to hustle the casinos. While in Vegas, Joe Jr. gives a gift to Janice at the hotel room and then tries to force himself on her sexually. Joe comes in and pulls him off. All three are visibly shaken and Joe Jr. runs out of the hotel. At Janice's request, Joe catches up with him and brings him back. She forgives Joe Jr., but it becomes clear to her that they cannot handle him alone without professional help.

While watching someone else roll the dice in Craps, Joe realizes that the cameras focus on the shooter. Using Joe Jr. as a partner, he demonstrates to Stanley and Janice that if he only rolls one die a partner across the table could drop a second weighted die in an almost unrecognizable move. Repeat the move and two weighted dice are on the table, enabling the crew to win big. Stanley originally agrees to drop the dice, but backs out because of fear that if he's caught he could lose his business. Joe Jr. offers to drop the dice and, after much reluctance, Joe agrees.

One by one they gather at a craps table in the casino. Joe Jr. comes up, drops the dice, but is asked to leave by a casino employee watching the table. As Joe Jr. walks out the door of the casino, the crew around the table begin to win with the weighted dice. Joe narrowly avoids being caught, and the crew succeeds in their score. However, after leaving the casino, Joe Jr. fails to show up at the meeting place. After a search, Joe finds Joe Jr. at a bus stop, ready to travel back to the residential facility. Joe Jr. explains that he has spoken to the manager and apologized for his past behavior. The facility has agreed to take Joe Jr. back until the group home is ready for him in six months. Joe at first resists, but eventually gives in and tearfully says goodbye to his son.

When returns to Janice he explains that Joe Jr. has "let him go."

== Cast ==
- Chazz Palminteri as Joe "Yonkers Joe"
- Christine Lahti as Janice
- Tom Guiry as Joe Jr.
- Michael Lerner as Stanley
- Linus Roache as Teddy
- Michael Rispoli as Mickey
- Roma Maffia as Santini
- Frank John Hughes as John Vincent
- Arthur J. Nascarella as Dino
- Saverio Guerra as "Bam"
- Chad McKnight as Simon
- Lauri Johnson as "Hammer"
- Dean Marrazzo as Casino Manager
- John Farrell as Fitz
- Bill Allison as Pitt Boss

== Themes ==
Though the film begins as a straight con movie, the early introduction of Joe Jr. reveals that the movie is about more than an entertaining con. "The movie's not just a gambling movie,” said Palminteri. “It's about a guy whose son is 21 years old with Down syndrome and wants to come live with his father. And he really doesn't want his son there. His son redeems him and he redeems his son."

== Reception ==
Yonkers Joe has an overall approval rating of 55% on Rotten Tomatoes.
