= Songs in Ordinary Time (film) =

- DVD cover
- Genre: Drama
- Based on: Songs in Ordinary Time by Mary McGarry Morris
- Written by: Malcolm MacRury
- Directed by: Rod Holcomb
- Starring: Sissy Spacek; Beau Bridges; Keir Dullea; Tom Guiry; Careena Melia; Angelica Torn
- Music by: Anthony Marinelli
- Country of origin: United States
- Original language: English

Production
- Executive producer: Craig Anderson
- Producers: Marty Eli Schwartz; Christopher Zimmer
- Cinematography: Neil Roach
- Editor: Michael Brown
- Running time: 90 minutes
- Production companies: Craig Anderson Productions; Columbia TriStar Television

Original release
- Network: CBS
- Release: October 22, 2000

Songs in Ordinary Time is a 2000 American made-for-television drama film starring Sissy Spacek and Beau Bridges. The film was written by Malcolm MacRury and directed by Rod Holcomb. It is an adaptation of the book Songs in Ordinary Time written by Mary McGarry Morris. Songs in Ordinary Time was entirely shot in Nova Scotia, Canada due to financial reasons. The film originally premiered on CBS on October 22, 2000.

== Plot ==
In Vermont in the 1960s, Mary Fermoyle, a divorced woman with three children to raise, allows the secretive Omar Duvall to enter her life. Duvall, however, may hide a huge secret.

== Cast ==
- Sissy Spacek as Mary Fermoyle
- Beau Bridges as Omar Duvall
- Keir Dullea as Sam Fermoyle
- Tom Guiry as Norman Fermoyle
- Careena Melia as Alice Fermoyle
- Jordan Warkol as Ben Fermoyle
- Angelica Torn as Astrid Haddad

== Reception ==
British website The Movie Scene gave the film three out of five stars. The reviewer critiqued almost every aspect of the movie, but Spacek and Bridges performances, stating: "Songs in Ordinary Time" is one of those movies which to be truthful is not very interesting, it is the sort of movie which plays out in front of your eyes and before you know it you are halfway through and you don't know how you got there. But in a way the reason why you get lost in "Songs in Ordinary Time" is because of who is in it as Sissy Spacek and Beau Bridges deliver such wonderful characters that you get caught up in their performances rather than what is going on."
