= Unaccompanied minor (passenger) =

Child using public transport without a legal guardian

An unaccompanied minor (sometimes "unaccompanied child" or "separated child") is a child traveling on a commercial flight, a train, a bus, a vessel, or any similar conveyance, without the presence of a legal guardian. Most commercial airlines and similar transporting carriers have Unaccompanied Minor (UM) Programs in place and it is estimated that as many as 7 million children travel by plane yearly, using these UM-programs in the United States alone.

== Reasons why children travel alone ==
Children all over the world increasingly have family members living far away, including divorced parents who moved overseas for a career opportunity or to start a new household. Each year many children travel alone as part of their education and development, for example to attend boarding and language schools, summer camps, or auditions. Some children may need to travel alone after a crisis situation involving their parents, or for relocation purposes.

== Unaccompanied Minor service ==
Most airlines have many years of experience safely transporting UMs. Unaccompanied Minor Service can be booked for a fee as an add-on to a flight reservation, under the so called “UM program”. Airline UM-programs are approved by national and international civil aviation regulators and larger air carriers tend to handle the transport of UM's on a daily basis and have trained staff and designated waiting areas at their hubs.

== Airline policy ==
In airline policy, an unaccompanied minor is typically an airline passenger aged between 5 and 14 years old (airline regulations vary) who travels without an accompanying adult. Minors whose accompanying adult travels on the same flight but in a different class may also be classified as unaccompanied minors. A parent or guardian who requests for this service fills out a release form, identifying another guardian who will pick up the minor at the destination airport. Airline personnel are responsible for escorting the child through immigration and customs and boarding the flight in time. A fee may be payable for this service.

During the flight, no special attention is given to the minor until the flight enters final descent to the destination. On descent, the minor is moved to the nearest exit, which could be in business or first class, so they can leave the aircraft at first opportunity and be transferred to the local ground staff. After clearing immigration and customs, the child is released only to the adult identified on the paperwork.

Some airlines have controversial unaccompanied minor seating policies which discriminate against adult male passengers on the basis of gender. Said policies are believed to be a response to reports of in-flight sexual assault, and subsequently the call from parents for airlines to better safeguard their children while traveling as a UM. The policies bar unaccompanied minors from being seated next to adult males and have led to significant criticism and successful legal action.

Some airlines, including Ryanair, will not carry unaccompanied minors.

== Airline and Carrier Policy ==
Airline and Carrier Policy
Airline or other carrier	Minimum Age	Mandatory Until Age	Optional Until Age	Minimum Solo Age	Reference
Air Asia	NA	NA	NA	12	The Skyrider Young Flyer program has been cancelled, effective 24 June 2013.
Air Canada	8	11	17	12	
Air China	5	11	17	12	
Air France	4	11	17	12	
Air New Zealand	5	11	16	12	Unaccompanied minors cannot travel on fares without checked luggage included.
American Airlines	5	14	17	15	
Amtrak train (Note: Rail transport)	13	15	NA	16	Unaccompanied minors cannot travel on Amtrak Thruway service. (Note: Road transport)
Asiana Airlines	5	12	NA	NA	
Belavia	5	15	NA	16	
Bridgeport & Port Jefferson Ferry (Note: Water transport)	NA	NA	NA	12	
British Airways	12	NA	NA	12	Service Ended 31 Jan 2017
Cape Air	8	14	Any	15	
Cathay Pacific	6	11	17	12	
China Airlines	5	11	NA	12	
Confederation Bridge pedestrian shuttle	NA	NA	NA	12	Children under 12 years of age must be accompanied by an adult for the crossing.
Cross Sound Ferry	NA	NA	NA	12	
Delta Air Lines	5	14	17	15	
EasyJet	NA	NA	NA	14	
Emirates	5	15	NA	16	
Eva Air	5	11	NA	12	
FlyBe	5	11	16	12	
Frontier Airlines	NA	NA	NA	15	
Greyhound Lines	NA	NA	NA	16	
Korean Air	5	11	16	12	
KLM	5	14	17	15	
LATAM	5	11	17	12	
LOT Polish Airlines	5	11	17	12	
Lufthansa	5	11	17	12	
Malaysia Airlines	5	14	NA	15	
Megabus (Europe)	16 (midnight to 05:00); 15 (05:00 to midnight)	17	NA	18 16 with parental consent	
Megabus (North America)	NA	NA	NA	17	
Norwegian Air Shuttle	5	11	15	12	Norwegian Air Shuttle does not currently offer Unaccompanied Minor Service to or from Bosnia, Bulgaria, the Caribbean (Guadeloupe, Martinique and St. Croix), Israel, Kosovo, Morocco, Serbia, Singapore, Thailand, Turkey, United Arab Emirates and the U.S.
Pegasus Airlines	7	13	17	14	
Qantas	6	11	15	12	
Ryanair	NA	NA	NA	16	
Singapore Airlines	5	11	17	12	
Southwest Airlines	5	11	NA	12	
Spirit Airlines	5	14	NA	15	
Swoop	NA	NA	NA	12	Swoop does not accept unaccompanied minors for travel.
Taoyuan Metro	NA	NA	NA	6	A child under 115 cm or documented to be under 6 years old rides free only if accompanied by any ticketed passenger, or risks being denied service.
Transavia	5	11	15	12	
United Airlines	5	15	NA	16	
Virgin Atlantic	5	15	NA	16	
WestJet	8	11	17	12	
WizzAir	NA	NA	NA	16	Children under 14 years old cannot fly unless accompanied by an adult at least 16 years of age.
WOW air	5	11	17	12	

== Exclusion criteria ==
Not all children are accepted as UMs and not all flights are available for UMs. Each airline has their own set of inclusion/exclusion criteria and these can vary on a single itinerary that is operated by multiple airlines on different segments. In general, any child who needs continuous supervision or individualized care beyond what airline staff can manage, will likely be denied by the airline UM-program. Any existing conditions that pose an increased risk of an in-flight emergency are also excluded.

Child-specific exclusion criteria include:

- Children younger or older than the intended age group, as determined by the airline
- Children with developmental delays or cognitive, behavioral or mental health challenges
- Children who are unable to communicate with airline staff due to a hearing/vision/speech impairment or language barrier
- Children with a severe allergy or medical condition like epilepsy or unstable juvenile diabetes
- Children who need a support animal
- Children who need scheduled or incidental in-flight medication

Operational exclusion criteria can include:

- International itineraries
- Red eye flights
- Itineraries involving a stopover and a connecting flight
- Itineraries involving an overnight layover
- A maximum of UMs on a particular flight

== Child travel companion services ==
Parents of children who need one-on-one support during their journey, or who are excluded from airline UM-programs for other reasons, can hire independent child travel companion services. These specialized companies employ dedicated chaperones, often with a background of child care or nursing, who can fly with the child to the destination, even on longhaul international flights. In some cases these companies have the ability to provide in-flight care, making it possible for children who suffer from severe allergies or other medical conditions to safely fly without their immediate caregivers.

== In popular culture ==
The 2006 Christmas film Unaccompanied Minors is about a team of six unaccompanied minors, portrayed by Tyler James Williams, Dyllan Christopher, Brett Kelly, Gina Mantegna, Quinn Shephard, and Dominique Saldaña.
