= Mr. Vincent =

1997 American film

Mr. Vincent is an American thriller film released in 1997 written, produced and directed by Robert Celestino. It was a 1997 Sundance Film entrant in the non-competition Spectrum section. It won the Critics' Award for best film at the Scermi di Amore Film Festival and the Best Dramatic Feature Award at the Long Island Film Festival. The film was shot in black and white.

== Plot ==
Following the transformation of Johnny Vincent, a Yonkers school teacher and aspiring singer-songwriter, as he progresses from being a kind-hearted suitor to evolving into a vindictive stalker.

== Cast ==
- Frank John Hughes as Johnny Vincent
- Lisa Locicero as Lisa
- Mimi Scott as Rhonda
- Robert Bruzio as Micky
- Shoshana Ami as Charlotte

== Reception ==
Variety said that the film is characterized by strong lead performances and keenly observed psychological nuances, distinguishing it as a noteworthy low-budget indie drama and highlighting director Robert Celestino's potential as a promising filmmaker. They thought that despite its harshly realistic tone, the film's impact is somewhat diminished by an ending that lacks conviction. They concluded that Frank John Hughes is excellently cast and delivers a compelling performance as Johnny Vincent, a high school teacher and aspiring singer-songwriter residing in Yonkers, New York. Johnny's life alternates between moments of fortune when he performs his music in modest bars, largely unnoticed by the patrons, and periods of misfortune when he struggles to maintain meaningful relationships with women.
