= Anywhere Road =

American film distributor

- Anywhere Road logo
- Industry: Film production and distribution
- Founded: 2007
- Headquarters: San Francisco, California, United States
- Key people: Robert Ogden Barnum, Sriram Das, Kaiser Wahab

Anywhere Road is an American independent film distributor based in San Francisco. Founded in 2007, Anywhere Road specializes in the distribution, production and sales of independent feature films.

Anywhere Road employed a "day and date" theatrical distribution model, releasing films simultaneously in a limited number of theaters alongside home video and other platforms. The company was founded by Robert Ogden Barnum; among its early releases was Antônia (2006), produced by Fernando Meirelles, and Black Irish (2007). In 2007, the company acquired U.S. distribution rights to Brad Gann's directorial debut Black Irish, which it released theatrically that autumn.

== List of Anywhere Road films ==
- Razor Eaters (2003)
- December Ends (2006)
- Outside Sales (2006)
- Antonia (2006)
- Military Intelligence and You! (2006)
- A Very British Gangster (2008)
- Sinner (2007)
- Black Irish (2007)
- Towncraft (2007)
- Farm Girl in New York (2008)
- Land of Confusion (2008)
