= Black Irish (film) =

2007 independent film by Brad Gann

- Promotional poster
- Directed by: Brad Gann
- Written by: Brad Gann
- Produced by: Kelly Crean; J. Todd Harris; Mark Donadio; Brad Gann; Jeffrey Orenstein
- Starring: Michael Angarano; Brendan Gleeson; Tom Guiry; Emily VanCamp; Melissa Leo
- Cinematography: Michael Fimognari
- Edited by: Andrea Bottigliero
- Music by: John Frizzell
- Distributed by: Anywhere Road
- Release dates: March 28, 2007 (DIFF); October 26, 2007 (United States)
- Country: United States
- Language: English

Black Irish is a 2007 American independent coming-of-age drama film directed, written, and co-produced by Brad Gann. It stars Michael Angarano, Brendan Gleeson, Tom Guiry, Emily VanCamp, and Melissa Leo and tells the story of a South Boston youngster trying to win the affection of his emotionally remote father and maintain intimacy with other members of his dysfunctional clan.

== Plot ==
Sixteen-year-old Cole McKay’s struggle for independence is put to the test as his South Boston Irish-Catholic family implodes around him. Older brother Terry is descending into a life of drugs and crime, pregnant sister Kathleen is being sent away to cover up the shame of unwed motherhood and Cole’s father, Desmond, spends his days in a fog of alcohol and self-pity, silently torturing himself over what might have been. The one thing keeping young Cole’s head above water is his love of baseball. The movie starts with Cole practicing his pitching, when he is picked up by his family to attend the funeral of Desmond's sister. A talented baseball pitcher, Cole overcomes self-doubt and family indifference to fight his way into the state championships. To get there he must make a life or death decision, one that will change the McKay family forever.

== Cast ==
- Michael Angarano as Cole McKay
- Brendan Gleeson as Desmond McKay
- Tom Guiry as Terry McKay
- Emily VanCamp as Kathleen McKay
- Melissa Leo as Margaret McKay
- Michael Rispoli as Joey
- Francis Capra as Anthony
- Wilson Better as Graves
- Bonnie Dennison as Maria
- Finn Curtin as Coach Mahoney
- Frank T. Wells as Father Magruder
- Kevin Chapman as Officer Pierce
- Bates Wilder as Officer Cowen
- Joe McEachern as Officer Gianelli
- John Fiore as Tommy Orsini

== Release ==
The film premiered at the Newport Beach Film Festival on 20 April 2007. It received a limited release, opening in Los Angeles, New York City and Boston on 26 October 2007. It was released on DVD on 8 January 2008 in the US and Canada.

== Reception ==
On Rotten Tomatoes the film has an approval rating of 31% based on reviews from 13 critics.

== See also ==
- List of baseball films
