= Bad Santa =

2003 film directed by Terry Zwigoff

- Theatrical release poster
- Directed by: Terry Zwigoff
- Written by: Glenn Ficarra; John Requa
- Story by: Ethan and Joel Coen; (uncredited)
- Produced by: John Cameron; Sarah Aubrey; Bob Weinstein
- Starring: Billy Bob Thornton; Tony Cox; Lauren Graham; Brett Kelly; Lauren Tom; John Ritter; Bernie Mac
- Cinematography: Jamie Anderson
- Edited by: Robert Hoffman
- Music by: David Kitay
- Production companies: Dimension Films; Triptych Pictures
- Distributed by: Miramax Films (Worldwide); Columbia Pictures (though Columbia TriStar Film Distributors International; select international territories)
- Release date: November 26, 2003
- Running time: 92 minutes
- Country: United States
- Language: English
- Budget: $23 million
- Box office: $76.5 million

Bad Santa is a 2003 American Christmas black comedy crime film directed by Terry Zwigoff, written by Glenn Ficarra and John Requa, and starring Billy Bob Thornton in the title role, with a supporting cast of Tony Cox, Lauren Graham, Brett Kelly, Lauren Tom, Bernie Mac, and John Ritter in his last live-action film appearance before his death on September 11, 2003; the film is dedicated to his memory. It follows Willie T. Soke (Thornton), a mall Santa who partners with a dwarf con man (Cox) to rob department stores on Christmas Eve.

Bad Santa was released in North America on November 26, 2003 by Miramax Films, with Columbia Pictures (through Columbia TriStar Film Distributors International) releasing in other territories, and was screened out of competition at the 2004 Cannes Film Festival. It received positive reviews and grossed $76.5 million on a $23 million budget. A sequel, Bad Santa 2, was released on November 23, 2016, to less favorable reviews and commercial failure.

== Plot ==
Willie T. Soke and his dwarf assistant Marcus Skidmore are professional thieves. Every year, Willie gets a job as a department store Santa Claus and Marcus as an elf to rob shopping malls on the night of Christmas Eve, with Marcus' wife Lois as their getaway driver. Marcus takes his job seriously, but Willie, a sex-addicted cursing alcoholic and drug addict, is steadily unable to perform with children.

When they are hired at the Saguaro Square Mall in Phoenix, Willie's vulgarity shocks the prudish mall manager Bob Chipeska, who brings them to the attention of security chief Gin Slagel. At the mall, Willie is visited by Thurman Merman, a friendly but exceedingly gullible, dimwitted young boy who believes he really is Santa and is constantly bullied by a teenage gang of skateboarders. At a bar, Willie meets Sue, a bartender with a fetish for Santa Claus, and they begin a sexual relationship.

After having casual sex with Sue in his beaten-up Impala, Willie is harassed and attacked by a man he had encountered earlier at the bar, but Thurman intervenes. Willie gives the boy a ride home, where he lives with his senile grandmother. Thurman reveals that his mother died and claims his father, Roger, is out "exploring the mountains" (though he is actually in jail for embezzlement). Willie tricks him into letting him rob their safe and steals Roger's BMW 740iL.

Bob overhears Willie having sex in a dressing room and sends Gin, who starts to investigate. After Willie sees his motel room being raided, he moves into Thurman's house, much to his delight. Marcus is angry at Willie for taking advantage of Thurman and disapproves of his sex addiction. Gin visits Roger, who inadvertently reveals that Willie is staying with Thurman illegally. Confronting Willie and Marcus, he tells them he has uncovered their plan, blackmailing them for half the score to keep silent.

Willie and Marcus’ partnership begins to falter, further exacerbated when Willie shows up to work drunk, destroying the Santa attraction. Willie, about to commit suicide by inhaling vehicle exhaust fumes, gives Thurman a letter of confession for the police, including his misdeeds and the heist planned for Christmas Eve. However, he sees Thurman's black eye and abandons the suicide attempt to confront the skateboarders; he assaults their leader, intimidating them to leave Thurman alone.

Furious at Gin's blackmail, Marcus and Lois set a trap for him. Feigning the need for a jump-start, Lois hits Gin with the car, crushing him between vehicles. When this fails to kill Gin, Marcus finishes him off by shocking him with jumper cables. Willie and Thurman prepare for the approaching holiday with help from Sue. On Christmas Eve, Willie, Marcus, and Lois raid the mall; although some technical difficulties arise, Willie successfully cracks the safe. He also gets a pink stuffed elephant that Thurman wants for Christmas. However, Marcus reveals to Willie that he intends to kill him, fed up with his increasing carelessness. As he is about to execute Willie, the police unexpectedly swarm in, tipped off by Willie's letter that he gave Thurman. A firefight ensues between Marcus and the cops while Willie flees. Determined to give Thurman his present, he leads the police on a chase to his house, ignoring their orders to freeze. He is shot repeatedly on Thurman's porch but survives.

An epilogue is told through a letter from a recovering Willie in the hospital. He expresses his gratitude to Thurman and reveals that he was cleared of the robbery—as the shooting of an unarmed Santa had embarrassed the police—and will be working for them as a sensitivity counselor. Sue is granted guardianship over Thurman and his house until his father's release, while Marcus and Lois are in prison; Willie ends the letter by hoping that Roger will avoid them and telling Thurman that he should be out of the hospital soon and to be ready for his return. When the skateboard gang leader harasses Thurman again, the latter finally stands up to the former by kicking him hard in the crotch and giving his bully the finger as he rides away on his bike.

== Cast ==
- Billy Bob Thornton as Willie T. Soke
- Tony Cox as Marcus Skidmore
- Lauren Graham as Sue
- Brett Kelly as Thurman Merman
- Lauren Tom as Lois Skidmore
- John Ritter as Bob Chipeska
- Bernie Mac as Gin Slagel
- Alex Borstein as Milwaukee Mother
- Ajay Naidu as Hindustani Troublemaker
- Billy Gardell as Milwaukee Security Guard
- Bryan Callen as Miami Bartender
- Tom McGowan as Harrison
- Max Van Ville as Skateboard Gang Leader
- Octavia Spencer as Opal
- Ryan Pinkston as Shoplifter
- Matt Walsh as Herb
- Ethan Phillips as Roger Merman
- Sheriff John Bunnell as Police Chief
- Cloris Leachman as Granny
- Kerry Rossall as Policeman
- Briana Norton as Pinball Girl

== Production ==
In January 2002, Variety announced that Terry Zwigoff would be directing Bad Santa (his fourth picture and follow-up to Ghost World) under Dimension Films, with Glenn Ficarra and John Requa writing the screenplay and the Coen brothers serving as executive producers.

The Coens had developed the concept for Bad Santa, before eventually hiring the writing team of Ficarra and Requa to bring the story to life. The Coens told Ficarra and Requa that the story would center on an alcoholic "bad Santa" who seeks redemption very later on; additionally, they wanted it to be as funny as The Bad News Bears. Afterward, Ficarra and Requa completed what they described as a "really crass script", with the Coens adding "a bunch of crass jokes". When the script's final draft was sent to Universal Pictures, the studio rejected it because "[I]t was the foulest, disgusting, misogynistic, anti-Christmas, anti-children thing we could imagine," all of which influenced Bob Weinstein of Miramax Films (Dimension's parent company) to give it the green-light.

=== Casting ===
The Coens initially tailored roles for specific actors, such as James Gandolfini as Willie (since they had worked with him on The Man Who Wasn't There), Danny Woodburn as Marcus, and Angus T. Jones as Thurman. Bill Murray, Jack Nicholson, and Robert De Niro were also considered for the role of Willie, but it eventually went to Billy Bob Thornton. Mickey Rooney auditioned for the role of Marcus. Zwigoff cast Tony Cox for the role of Marcus and Brett Kelly for Thurman, which led to disagreements between himself and the producers. Upon learning of Cox's casting, the Coens told Weinstein that they "hate" him, and according to Zwigoff, Dimension was pining for "a more Disney-like generic cute kid" to play Thurman. "Maybe there are other actors who could do a great job with these parts. But Tony and Brett are just funny. They are these characters," explained Zwigoff.

=== Filming ===
The movie was filmed in various parts of California. Filming began on July 8, 2002, and ended in September 2002. The "Miami Beach" sequence at the beginning of the movie was filmed in Long Beach, while all of the scenes at Thurman's house were filmed in West Hills. All of the Saguaro Square Mall scenes were filmed entirely in the northeastern wing of Del Amo Fashion Center in Torrance, particularly in the former Montgomery Ward building, which was used for the mall's fictional anchor store, "Chamberlain's". The store and the entire wing were both vacant at the time of the movie's filming. The wing and building where the movie was filmed have since been demolished and replaced with the mall's new open-air lifestyle center.

== Reception ==
=== Box office ===
The film grossed over $60 million domestically and more than $76 million in total worldwide.

=== Critical response ===
On Rotten Tomatoes, Bad Santa has a 78% rating, based on 221 reviews. The site's critics consensus reads: "A gloriously rude and gleefully offensive comedy, Bad Santa isn't for everyone, but grinches will find it uproariously funny." On Metacritic, the film has a score of 70 out of 100, based on 38 critics, indicating "generally favorable" reviews. Audiences polled by CinemaScore gave the film a "B" grade on an A+ to F scale.

An editorial in The Washington Times likened the movie to an "evil twin" of Miracle on 34th Street and chided The Walt Disney Company for allowing such a beloved figure as Santa Claus to be trashed by Miramax Films, then a Disney subsidiary.

Roger Ebert of the Chicago Sun-Times gave the film 3 1/2 stars out of four, writing how Bad Santa was a "demented, twisted [and] unreasonably funny work of comic kamikaze style".

== Home media ==
Buena Vista Home Entertainment released the film to DVD on June 22, 2004, and in November 2006, a director's cut version was also released on DVD. It was then released to Blu-ray on November 20, 2007. The Blu-ray edition featured several new special features, including a 27-minute Q&A with Zwigoff and Hoffman, moderated by Roger Ebert. The feature with Ebert was recorded in April 2006, under three months before he lost the ability to speak following surgery for salivary gland cancer.

Lionsgate later reissued the film on home video who reissued it on home video around this time. The film was also made available on the streaming service Paramount+, and Paramount Home Entertainment reissued it on DVD on September 22, 2020. On November 9, 2021, Paramount Home Entertainment released it on a triple feature DVD set titled Naughty Holiday 3-Movie Collection, which also included Office Christmas Party and Surviving Christmas (a DreamWorks film Paramount acquired the rights to in 2006).

== Sequel ==
On October 29, 2015, it was announced that Billy Bob Thornton would return for Bad Santa 2, and that filming would begin in Montreal in January 2016 for a scheduled release of Christmas 2016. On November 3, 2015, it was announced that Mean Girls director Mark Waters would direct the film. On November 19, 2015, it was announced that Kathy Bates would join the cast as Willie's mother, and that Brett Kelly and Tony Cox would reprise their roles from the first film. On December 21, 2015, it was announced that Bad Santa 2 would be released on November 23, 2016. On January 6, 2016, Christina Hendricks joined the cast.

== See also ==
- List of Christmas films
