= Songs in Ordinary Time =

1995 novel by Mary McGarry Morris

- Author: Mary McGarry Morris
- Language: English
- Genre: Novel
- Publisher: Allen Lane
- Publication date: August 1995
- Publication place: United States
- Media type: Print (Hardback & Paperback)
- Pages: 740 pp (hardback edition)
- ISBN: 0-670-86014-X (hardback edition) & 0613121260 (paperback edition)
- OCLC: 31606426
- Dewey Decimal: 813/.54 20
- LC Class: PS3563.O874454 S66 1995

Songs in Ordinary Time is the 1995 novel by Mary McGarry Morris, and was chosen as an Oprah's Book Club selection in June 1997.

== Plot introduction ==
A novel set in a small town in Vermont in 1960 offers the story of lonely and vulnerable Marie Fermoyle, her three children, and a dangerous con man.

== Movie ==
A made-for-television film adaptation, starring Sissy Spacek and Beau Bridges was released in 2000. The film was directed by Rod Holcomb, screenplay written by Malcolm Macrury, with music by Anthony Marinelli.
