= Airline seating sex discrimination controversy =

Criticism of airlines for seating policy

Four airlines, British Airways, Qantas, Air New Zealand and Virgin Australia, have attracted criticism for their controversial seating policies which allegedly discriminate against adult male passengers on the basis of their sex. These four companies refused to allow unaccompanied children to be seated next to adult males on their flights, leading to criticism that they regard all men as a danger to children.

The policies resulted in protests against the airlines and criticism by civil liberties groups and children's charities. British Airways ended its policy in August 2010 following a successful legal action undertaken by Mirko Fischer.

== British Airways ==
In March 2001, it was revealed that British Airways had a policy to ban seating adult male passengers next to unaccompanied children (any person under the age of 15), even if their parents were elsewhere on the aircraft. This led to accusations that the airline considered men to be potential pedophiles and women to be incapable of such abuse. The issue was first raised when a business executive had moved seats to be closer to two of his colleagues. A flight attendant then asked him to move because he was sitting next to two unaccompanied children which was a breach of BA company policy. The executive said he felt humiliated as a result, stating, "I felt I was being singled out and that I was being accused of something". British Airways admitted that staff were under instructions to keep men away from unaccompanied children whenever possible because of the danger of male pedophiles.

This issue came to prominence again in 2005 following complaints by Michael Kemp, who had been instructed to swap seats with his wife when on a GB Airways flight. The flight attendant informed him that it was a breach of the airline's child welfare regulations for an adult male stranger to be sitting next to a child. This case was considered more unusual because the policy was applied even though the girl's parents were on board the flight. Michele Elliott, director of the children's charity Kidscape, stated that the rule was "utterly absurd. It brands all men as potential sex offenders".

In 2006, politician Boris Johnson criticized the company after a staff member mistakenly attempted to separate him from his own children on a flight. He stated that those who create or defend such policies "fail to understand the terrible damage that is done by this system of presuming guilt in the entire male population just because of the tendencies of a tiny minority", linking such discrimination to the reduced number of male teachers and therefore lower achievement in schools. Like others, Johnson also raised the policy's flaw in ignoring female abusers and branded airlines with such policies as "cowardly" for giving in to "loony hysteria".

British Airways defended the policy, stating it had been implemented as a result of requests from customers. The company claimed that it "was responding to a fear of sexual assaults".

=== Court case ===
In January 2010, businessman Mirko Fischer from Luxembourg sued British Airways for sex discrimination following an incident where he was forced to change seats as a result of the policy, thus separating him from his pregnant wife. On 24 June 2010, Fischer was successful in winning compensation from British Airways with the company sex discrimination in Fischer's case. BA paid £2,161 in costs and £750 in damages which Fischer donated to child protection charities. In June 2010, BA said that the policy was under review. In August 2010, it changed its policy and began seating unaccompanied children in a nondiscriminatory manner near the cabin crew.

=== Discontinuation ===
In February 2016, British Airways announced the discontinuation of its "Unaccompanied Minor" (UM) service for children under 12 years old.

== Qantas and Air New Zealand ==
=== Incidents in New Zealand ===
In November 2005, it was revealed that Qantas and Air New Zealand have seating policies similar to those of British Airways. The policy came to light following an incident in 2004 when Mark Wolsay, a shipping manager, who was seated next to a young boy on a Qantas flight in New Zealand, was asked to change seats with a female passenger. A steward informed him that "it was the airline's policy that only women were allowed to sit next to unaccompanied children".

Wolsay stated that he felt that the policy was "totally discriminatory", and the New Zealand Herald suggested to the airline that the policy implied "[Qantas] considered male passengers to be dangerous to children". New Zealand's Green Party stated that the policy was discriminatory and reported the matter to the Human Rights Commissioner. Upon learning of the policies, several protests occurred, including a 22-hour treetop protest led by double amputee Kevin Gill in Nelson, New Zealand. He stated that the policy could be the thin end of a wedge with men soon banned from sitting next to children at sports events and on other forms of public transport. Gill also raised the issue of what would happen if the policy had been race-based and targeted ethnic minorities rather than men.

The publicity given to the issue in 2005 caused others to publicly describe their experiences. Bethlehem fire officer Philip Price revealed he had been forced to switch seats in 2002 on an Air New Zealand flight to Christchurch.

=== Incidents in Australia ===
Cameron Murphy, president of the NSW Council for Civil Liberties, criticized the policy and stated that "there was no basis for the ban". He said it was wrong to assume that all adult males pose a danger to children. The policy has also been criticized for failing to take female abusers into consideration, as well as ignoring instances of children who commit sex offences. As with the British Airways case, critics such as school headmaster Kelvin Squire made the link between such policies and wider problems in society, such as the shortage of male teachers.

Some have defended the policy, with the New South Wales Commissioner for Children and Young People, Gillian Calvert, stating that there were more male sex offenders than female, and thus "in the absence of any other test, it's one way in which the airline can reduce the risk of children travelling alone". She believes that the likelihood of an attack was rare, but not impossible, claiming "it's only a few men who do this sort of stuff, but when they do it they diminish all men". Air New Zealand spokesman David Jamieson said the company had no intention of reviewing the policy and acknowledged that it had been in place for many years.

In August 2012, the controversy resurfaced when Daniel McLuskie, a nurse, had to swap seats with a female passenger on a Qantas flight after the crew noticed he was sitting next to an unrelated girl travelling alone. McLuskie said that he felt discriminated and humiliated in front of the other passengers, being treated as a pedophile. A Qantas spokesman defended the policy as consistent with that of other airlines in Australia and around the globe.

== Virgin Australia ==
In 2012, it became public knowledge that Virgin Australia had also implemented this policy. Johnny McGirr, a 33-year-old firefighter from Sydney, was told to move seats by a Virgin Australia flight attendant. When asked why, the flight attendant cited policy and told McGirr, "You can't sit next to two unaccompanied minors." The attendant then asked a female passenger, "Can you please sit in this seat because he is not allowed to sit next to minors". A public backlash on Twitter prompted Virgin Australia to review its policy barring men from sitting beside unaccompanied children on flights.
