= Bad Santa 2 =

2016 film by Mark Waters

- Theatrical release poster
- Directed by: Mark Waters
- Screenplay by: Johnny Rosenthal; Shauna Cross
- Based on: Characters created by Glenn Ficarra; John Requa
- Produced by: Geyer Kosinski; Andrew Gunn
- Starring: Billy Bob Thornton; Kathy Bates; Tony Cox; Christina Hendricks; Brett Kelly; Ryan Hansen; Jenny Zigrino; Jeff Skowron; Mike Starr
- Cinematography: Theo van de Sande
- Edited by: Travis Sittard
- Music by: Lyle Workman
- Production companies: Miramax; Ingenious; Media Talent Group; Gunn Films
- Distributed by: Broad Green Pictures (United States); Entertainment One (United Kingdom and Canada)
- Release dates: November 15, 2016 (New York City); November 23, 2016 (United States)
- Running time: 92 minutes
- Countries: Canada; United Kingdom; United States
- Language: English
- Budget: $26 million
- Box office: $24.1 million

Bad Santa 2 is a 2016 American Christmas black comedy crime film directed by Mark Waters and written by Shauna Cross and Johnny Rosenthal. A sequel to the 2003 film Bad Santa, the film stars Billy Bob Thornton, Tony Cox, Brett Kelly, Kathy Bates, and Christina Hendricks, and features criminals Willie and Marcus again teaming up to work as Santa and an elf, respectively, this time to rob a Chicago charity on Christmas Eve.

Principal photography began on January 11, 2016, in Montreal, and the film was released in the United States on November 23, 2016, by Broad Green Pictures, with Entertainment One releasing in the United Kingdom and Canada. In contrast to the original film, it received generally negative reviews and grossed $24.1 million worldwide (less than a third of the original film's $76.5 million) against its $26 million budget; making it a box office bomb.

== Plot ==
Set 14 years after the first film, Willie Soke remains depressed as ever, upset his "happy ending" did not pan out, as he is again addicted to sex, alcohol, drugs, and tobacco. As he tries and fails to kill himself, he is visited by Thurman "The Kid" Merman, who has just turned 21 and works at a sandwich shop called Hungry Hoagies. Unfortunately, Thurman's father has abandoned him and his grandmother has passed on two years before making Willie the closest thing to family he has left. Thurman delivers to Willie a package containing a large sum of cash, and Willie soon finds out it's from Marcus, his former partner who has been released from jail after the events 14 years earlier. Marcus, expressing sincere remorse for betraying Willie, tells Willie he has an opportunity in Chicago that can potentially net them millions, though he is unwilling to disclose the name of his contact. Willie reluctantly agrees, while unsuccessfully trying to help Thurman lose his virginity before he leaves for Chicago.

Upon their arrival, Willie is annoyed to learn that not only is the target of the con a charity but that his estranged mother, Sunny, is Marcus' contact. Willie reluctantly agrees since Sunny, who uses "shit stick" as a term of endearment for Willie, is suffering from the early stages of Parkinson's Disease, though he secretly makes a deal with Marcus to cut Sunny out when the time comes. Forced to don the Santa suit once more, Willie is arrested when he beats up a much jollier Santa who Willie mistakenly thinks is a pedophile, but is bailed out by one of the charity's founders, Diane. Though she wants to fire Willie for his behavior, she relents when he agrees to attend AA meetings with her. Diane's husband, Regent, who also runs the charity and is cheating on Diane with his secretary, Alice, orders his head security guard Dorfman to track and follow Willie, becoming suspicious of how much time he's spending with Diane.

Meanwhile, Marcus, after doing recon work, tries to seduce security guard Gina so he can obtain the keys to Regent's office where the charity's safe is kept, but he fails to do so, as Gina is "high maintenance". Elsewhere, Willie starts a sexual relationship with Diane, and he and Sunny start to bond, especially when the two of them rob a mansion together with Willie posing as Santa and Sunny as Mrs. Claus. As they bond over their haul afterward, Sunny gives Willie a gun so he can betray and take revenge on Marcus, despite Willie's insistence that Marcus has changed.

Thurman soon arrives in Chicago, having followed Willie to the city. Willie at first considers leaving him at a laundromat but soon takes him to the charity's shelter. Thurman ends up joining the children's choir, which is set to have a concert on the night of Willie, Sunny, and Marcus's heist. Willie soon encounters Gina, who, thanks to Sunny's prodding, believes Willie wants to sleep with her. They have sex in the bathroom of a bar, and Willie obtains the keys. On the night of the show/robbery, Willie catches Thurman singing, which makes the kid very happy. As Willie cracks the safe, Marcus is about to betray him again, but they escape just as Regent and Dorfman discover the con. However, Sunny reveals she is betraying them both, telling Willie the bullets in the gun she gave him are blanks before shooting Marcus. She tries to escape by disappearing into a crowd of people dressed as Santa at an outdoor party. Willie, Regent, and Dorfman chase her. Despite blending in, Willie catches her and attempts to take the bag of stolen cash by saying the kids need it more. In their struggle, the bag is torn open and the money goes flying into the crowd. Enraged, Sunny attempts to shoot him again, but hits Thurman in his behind instead. Both Sunny and Willie are arrested, but Willie is not charged due to his help in catching Sunny. While he recovers, he is visited in the hospital by Diane who wakes him up with a handjob.

Willie soon takes a job as a janitor at the charity, where he continues to visit Thurman and accepts him as family. He also visits an injured Marcus, but proceeds to "tea bag" him and post pictures of this on Instagram, as revenge against Marcus for doing the same thing to him.

== Cast ==
- Billy Bob Thornton as Willie Soke
- Kathy Bates as Sunny Soke
- Tony Cox as Marcus Skidmore
- Christina Hendricks as Diane Hastings
- Brett Kelly as Thurman Merman
- Ryan Hansen as Regent Hastings
- Jenny Zigrino as Gina De Luca
- Jeff Skowron as Dorfman
- Cristina Rosato as Alice
- Mike Starr as Jolly Santa
- Octavia Spencer as Opal

== Production ==
In 2009, Billy Bob Thornton first mentioned the sequel to the 2003 film Bad Santa, with an aim for release at Christmas 2011. On December 16, 2010, it was announced that Miramax and The Weinstein Company (TWC) had signed on an agreement to develop sequels including one for Bad Santa. On March 18, 2011, TheWrap reported that Weinstein confirmed the sequel and negotiations had begun with Thornton to return for the lead role. On July 14, 2011, the Los Angeles Times confirmed that Dimension Films and other producers on the film, including Geyer Kosinski, had hired writers Johnny Rosenthal and John Phillips to work on the screenplay. The sequel was scheduled to begin shooting in fall 2012 for a December 2013 release. On July 30, 2012, it was reported that Steve Pink was in early talks with the studio to rewrite and direct the film. On May 30, 2013, it was revealed that Miramax has hired Entourage creator Doug Ellin to rewrite the script, and to possibly direct the sequel.

In October 2014, Thornton confirmed that the sequel was in development, adding "We're never gonna beat the first one but you got to get as close as you can." On October 29, 2015, it was confirmed that Thornton would return to play Willie in Bad Santa 2, and that filming would begin in Montreal in January 2016, for a scheduled release of Christmas 2016. Miramax and Broad Green Pictures would co-finance the film, with Broad Green also distributing the film in the United States, and Sierra/Affinity handling the international sales for the film. On November 3, 2015, it was announced that Mean Girls director Mark Waters would direct the film from a script by Rosenthal, Ellin, and Shauna Cross, while Brett Kelly and Tony Cox both from the first film also signed on to return.

On November 19, 2015, it was announced that Kathy Bates would join the cast as Willie's foul-mouthed mother, while Andrew Gunn would also produce the film, along with Kosinski. Originally, Rosenthal had written the character as Willie's father, Earl, but Cross believed changing the character to Willie's mother would be funnier. Cross explained, "I think that while there's something funny about an absentee father, the terrible father figure is played out. You're screwed if you have a bad dad, but you're extra screwed if you have a mother who is that terrible. It almost seemed to thematically show the origins and set the tone of what the original film was about." Rosenthal agreed with the change, adding, "Seeing Earl turn into Sunny didn't change anything story-wise. You wouldn't notice much of a difference between the two – they were both chauvinistic, misogynistic, racist, abusive alcoholics. But I think it was a great choice just to add a little estrogen, no matter how testosterone-fueled it was. I think that switch only added to the humor of the finished product." Cross was convinced that only one actress was right for the part, saying, "I think the minute we had the idea to make it the mom I only pictured Kathy Bates as that person. It had to be her. I think I kept calling her 'Kathy' while I was writing her even before we had her."

On January 6, 2016, Christina Hendricks joined the cast, playing the head of a charitable organization. On January 11, 2016, more cast was added to the film, including Ryan Hansen, Jenny Zigrino, and Jeff Skowron. Principal photography on the film began on January 11, 2016, in Montreal. Filming took place on locations including Saint Catherine Street and Saint-Alexandre.

== Release ==
In December 2015, it was announced that Bad Santa 2 would be released on November 23, 2016, by Broad Green Pictures in America, while Sony Pictures Worldwide Acquisitions would handle worldwide distribution. The first promotional trailer for the film was released on August 9, 2016.

=== Box office ===
Bad Santa 2 grossed $17.8 million in the United States and Canada and $5.4 million in other countries for a worldwide total of $23.2 million, against a production budget of $26 million.

Bad Santa 2 opened alongside Moana, Rules Don't Apply and Allied, and was expected to gross $15–20 million from 2,920 theaters over its first five days. The film ended up grossing $9 million over its first five days ($6.1 million in its opening weekend), finishing below expectations and 7th at the box office. It was also down 46% from the five-day opening of the first film, which made $16.8 million in 2003.

=== Critical response ===
On Rotten Tomatoes, Bad Santa 2 holds an approval rating of 23% based on 135 reviews. The site's critical consensus reads, "Loaded up with the same scatological and misanthropic humor as its predecessor but precious little of its heart or genuine wit, Bad Santa 2 presents a foulmouthed shadow of Christmas past." On Metacritic, the film has a weighted average score of 38 out of 100, based on 36 critics, indicating "generally unfavorable" reviews. Audiences polled by CinemaScore gave the film an average grade of "C+" on an A+ to F scale (lower than the first film's "B"), while PostTrak reported filmgoers gave it a 69% overall positive score and a 51% "definite recommend".

Alex Welch of IGN gave the film 5/10, and wrote that it "does little to dispel the notion that most sequels simply aren't necessary." Ben Kenigsberg for The New York Times also found the film wanting, although praised Kathy Bates' performance. Vince Mancini for Uproxx said that the sequel will make [one] appreciate the original, and criticised the film's humor as "plug-to-play one liners", while also noting that the film "isn't terrible".

Amy Nicholson for MTV mockingly referred to the film as Badly Traumatized Santa, and wrote that "[it] doesn't hate Christmas."

== See also ==
- List of Christmas films
