= Ed (film) =

- Theatrical release poster
- Directed by: Bill Couturié
- Screenplay by: David Mickey Evans
- Story by: Ken Richards; Janus Cercone
- Produced by: Rosalie Swedlin; Bill Finnegan
- Starring: Matt LeBlanc; Jayne Brook; Bill Cobbs; Jack Warden
- Cinematography: Alan Caso
- Edited by: Robert K. Lambert; Todd E. Miller
- Music by: Stephen Endelman
- Production company: Longview Entertainment
- Distributed by: Universal Pictures
- Release date: March 15, 1996
- Running time: 94 minutes
- Budget: $24 Million
- Box office: $4,422,330

Ed is a 1996 American sports comedy film starring Matt LeBlanc about a talented baseball pitcher and his friendly ball-playing chimpanzee as his team's mascot.

== Plot ==
Jack "Deuce" Cooper is a farm boy who arrives at an open tryout for a minor league baseball team. He makes the team after blowing away the scouts with his 'rocket' arm as well as having a strong training camp. Deuce also befriends a chimpanzee, Ed, after being told the chimp is his roommate and teammate. After they move into their apartment, Deuce develops a relationship Lydia his neighbor. Ed becomes very close with her and Elizabeth, her daughter. Deuce's game really begins to take off as well as Ed's and the team becomes a league contender. Deuce's coach, Chubb, thinks Deuce can play in the major leagues. But after the owners sell Ed to make a buck, Deuce takes matters into his own hands and goes to find Ed only to see him being tortured by a pair of goons. Deuce saves Ed but Ed escapes and finds a truck of frosted bananas and does not realize he is stuck inside. Ed ends up in the hospital after almost freezing to death before the final game. Deuce questions his own ability to continue playing without his best friend. Deuce ends up playing and struggles. But when Ed, Elizabeth, and Lydia arrive at the game together, Deuce turns up the heat and the Rockets win. Deuce eventually gets called up to the Dodgers. Deuce and Lydia get married and them and Ed and Elizabeth become a family.

== Cast ==
- Matt LeBlanc as Jack "Deuce" Cooper
- Jay Caputo and Denise Cheshire as Ed
- Jayne Brook as Lydia
- Doren Fein as Liz
- Jack Warden as Chubb
- Bill Cobbs as Tipton
- Jim Caviezel as Dizzy
- Jim O'Heir as Art
- Steve Eastin as Shark's Manager
- Brad Hunt as Carnie
- Sage Allen as Cooper's Mother
- Stan Ivar as Cooper's Father

== Production ==
In May 1993, the film was announced to be in development under the title You Should See Them Play and was one of three active monkey/ape films announced to be in development along with Dunston Checks In (then known as Prime Mates) at 20th Century Fox and Monkey Trouble (then known as Pet) at New Line Cinema. Ken Richards wrote the original screenplay and rewrites were provided by Janus Cercone and David Mickey Evans.Matt LeBlanc and Matthew Perry competed for the lead role of Jack "Deuce" Cooper with LeBlanc winning out over Perry. The titular Ed was brought to life through a mixture of animatronics made by David Nelson and Norman Tempia while gymnasts Jay Caputo and Denise Cheshire would play the role in full make-up when more fluid actions were needed. Ed marked the narrative film debut of documentary filmmaker Bill Couturié. The movie was shot from April through July of 1995 in Los Angeles, California. During production, the film was known under the working title of Mickey's Monkey. On his decision to do Ed, LeBlanc said in a 2014 interview:

That was, on paper, a great idea. [Laughs.] It was supposed to be like a Disney movie for kids, but made by Universal, about a guy who played baseball, and there was a chimp on the team who played third base. The script was great, and the guy learned about his life, turned his life around. It was just this kind of warm, sweet little kids’ movie. I went to a few screenings, and the kids did love it. It was a cute little movie.

Primatologist Roger Fouts served as a technical advisor and directed Caputo to effectively mimic chimp behaviors. Due to how loud the animatronics in the chimp's head were during filming, LeBlanc had to redub some of his close-up scenes during post-production to accommodate for the noise.

== Release ==
Ed was released theatrically in the United States on March 15, 1996. A home video released followed on August 6, 1996.

== Reception ==
On the review aggregator website Rotten Tomatoes, 6% of 17 critics' reviews are positive, with an average rating of 2.7/10. Metacritic, which uses a weighted average, assigned the film a score of 25 out of 100, based on 11 critics, indicating "generally unfavorable" reviews. Audiences surveyed by CinemaScore gave the film a grade of "B+" on a scale of A+ to F.

== See also ==
- List of baseball films
