= Unaccompanied Minors =

2006 Christmas comedy film

- Theatrical release poster
- Directed by: Paul Feig
- Screenplay by: Jacob Meszaros; Mya Stark
- Based on: "In the Event of an Emergency, Put Your Sister in an Upright Position" by Susan Burton
- Produced by: Lauren Shuler Donner; Michael Aguilar
- Starring: Lewis Black; Wilmer Valderrama; Tyler James Williams; Dyllan Christopher; Brett Kelly; Gia Mantegna; Quinn Shephard
- Cinematography: Christopher Baffa
- Edited by: George Folsey, Jr.; Brad E. Wilhite
- Music by: Michael Andrews
- Production companies: Village Roadshow Pictures; The Donners' Company; Unaccompanied Pictures
- Distributed by: Warner Bros. Pictures
- Release date: December 8, 2006
- Running time: 87 minutes
- Country: United States
- Language: English
- Budget: $25 million
- Box office: $21.9 million

Unaccompanied Minors is a 2006 American Christmas comedy film directed by Paul Feig and starring Lewis Black, Wilmer Valderrama, Tyler James Williams, Dyllan Christopher, Brett Kelly, Gia Mantegna, and Quinn Shephard.

The film is inspired by a true story by Susan Burton first told on the public radio show This American Life, under the title In the Event of an Emergency, Put Your Sister in an Upright Position in 2001.

Unaccompanied Minors was released on December 8, 2006, by Warner Bros. Pictures. It received mixed reviews from critics and grossed nearly $22 million against a $25 million budget.

== Plot ==
Spencer Davenport and his sister Katherine must fly from California to Pennsylvania on Christmas Eve to spend the holidays with their dad. At their layover at the Midwestern Hoover International Airport, the siblings meet chaperone Zach Van Bourke. However, a massive blizzard grounds all planes and cancels all flights, and Zach sends the siblings to the anarchic UM (unaccompanied minor) room, where they meet Christmas-spirited genius Charlie Goldfinch, surly tomboy Donna Malone, arrogant rich girl Grace Conrad, and mysterious Beef Wellington.

Charlie, Spencer, Beef, Grace, and Donna sneak out, and proceed to enjoy themselves around the airport breaking a lot of the rules. Caught by airport security guards and returned to the UM room, they find the other minors, Katherine included, have been sent to a lodge down the road, and that the grouchy head of passenger relations, Oliver Porter – whose trip to Hawaii was also canceled – intends for the kids to spend Christmas Eve in the UM room. Knowing that it will break Katherine's faith in Santa Claus if she does not receive a present by the next morning, Spencer asks the others to help him get a present for her.

With Spencer's plan, the kids escape the UM room again, and Oliver, desperate to get the kids back, sends all the guards to find them. After Donna and Grace get into a fight, Spencer insists they all put their differences aside and work together, and Beef leaves in search of a Christmas tree. Along the way, he reflects on how his stepfather, Ernie, hoped to make him stronger by saying men are made, not born. Meanwhile, Spencer and Katherine's father tries to drive to the airport in his biodiesel fueled car, which breaks down.

The kids head to a thinly secured exit in the back of the airport, distracting the guards by freeing a dog. Attempting to hide from Oliver in the baggage claim, Charlie climbs into a suitcase which gets placed on a conveyor belt; Donna gets on the conveyor belt herself to follow him. Spencer and Grace follow them to the unclaimed baggage warehouse, where they find many presents, including a set of walkie-talkies, and a doll for Katherine.

After seeing the kids on security cameras, Oliver and the guards chase them through the warehouse. Using a canoe, the kids take Zach captive and sled to the lodge while pursued by the guards, eluding Oliver. While on the elevator, Grace has to remove her contact lenses and put on her glasses, to her embarrassment. Spencer and Grace search for Katherine while Charlie and Donna deal with Oliver, and reunite to find Katherine asleep in the lobby, and place the doll in her arms.

With their mission completed, the minors quietly go back to the airport with Oliver. He bumps them from their flights and places them under surveillance. The kids then confess why they act the way they do. An emotional Grace admits that even though her parents are still together, they rarely spend time with her and are traveling without her during Christmas. She has just returned from boarding school and chose to stay at the airport instead of going to her nearby home. A sympathetic Spencer devises an escape plan.

Using the walkie-talkies, the minors tamper with the security cameras and escape through air ducts. They find the Christmas decorations Oliver confiscated, and Beef returns with a huge Christmas tree that he had obtained by trading away his prized Aquaman action figure. With Zach's help, the kids decorate the airport, and take items from the unclaimed baggage warehouse to use as presents for the rest of the stranded passengers.

Oliver finds Spencer to admit defeat, and reveals that he is unhappy because he has no family to spend Christmas with and his wife divorced him on Christmas five years ago. Spencer inspires some holiday spirit in him.

On Christmas morning, Oliver dresses up as Santa Claus, hands out presents to the passengers and has the minors' flights restored. Spencer reunites with Katherine, their father arrives to pick them up, Beef tells a girl about his trek to find a Christmas tree, Charlie and Donna exchange phone numbers and kiss, and Grace accepts Spencer's invitation to spend Christmas with him and his family.

== Cast ==
- Dyllan Christopher as Spencer Davenport
- Lewis Black as Oliver Porter
- Gia Mantegna as Grace Conrad
- Tyler James Williams as Charles "Charlie" Goldfinch
- Quinn Shephard as Donna Malone
- Wilmer Valderrama as Zach Van Bourke
- Brett Kelly as Timothy "Beef" Wellington
- Dominique Saldaña as Katherine Davenport
- Paget Brewster as Valerie Davenport
- Rob Corddry as Samuel "Sam" Davenport
- Wayne Federman as Airport Attendant
- Mario Lopez as Part-Time Substitute minors watcher
- Jessica Walter as Cindi
- Rob Riggle as Head Guard Hoffman
- David Koechner as Ernie
- B. J. Novak as Tommy Black
- Mindy Kaling as Restaurant Hostess
- Tony Hale as Alan Davies
- Cedric Yarbrough as Melvin "Mel" Goldfinch
- Kristen Wiig as Carole Malone
- Al Roker as Himself
- Teri Garr as Aunt Judy (uncredited)
- The Kids in the Hall's Bruce McCulloch, Kevin McDonald, and Mark McKinney as Mr. Porter's security guards (aka 'The Guards In The Hall')
- Former Kevin and Bean co-host Allie Mac Kay as Perky Presenter

== Production ==
In December 2003, it was reported that Warner Bros. Pictures had acquired a comedy pitch from The Donners' Company and This American Life producers WBEZ based on an essay writer Susan Burton had read for the program detailing a childhood experience of being snowed in at Chicago’s O'Hare International Airport the day after Christmas, stranded with a lot of other kids from divorced families who spent the holidays flying from one parent to the other. Jacob Meszaros and Mya Stark were set to write the screenplay with Stark also set to direct as the two had written and directed the short film P.E. which followed a trio of seventh grade girls in their various attempts to get excused from gym class, which got the two representation from Endeavor. In November 2005, it was reported that the script had been rewritten by Kate Kondell and that Paul Feig had been set to direct and would also add further polish to the script. In February 2006, Wilmer Valderrama, Brett Kelly, and Tyler James Williams had joined the cast and that the setting for the film had been changed to the fictitious Hoover International Airport.

Shooting on this film went on in both Salt Lake City, Utah, and also in Scotland.

== Soundtrack ==
Tyler James Williams recorded a song for the film with the same name but was not used in the film, only in a television spot to promote the film.

== Reception ==
=== Box office ===
Unaccompanied Minors grossed $16.7 million in the United States, and $5.3 million in other territories, for a worldwide gross of $21.9 million, against a production budget of $25 million.

The film grossed $5.7 million in its opening weekend, finishing seventh. In its second weekend it dropped 39% to $3.5 million, finishing 10th.

=== Critical response ===
On Rotten Tomatoes, the film holds an approval rating of 29% based on 85 reviews, with an average rating of 4.8/10. The website's critics consensus reads: "Unaccompanied Minors, while featuring credible performances by its mostly young cast, is simply a rehash of other, funnier movies." On Metacritic the film has a weighted average score of 43 out of 100 based on 22 critics, indicating "mixed or average" reviews. Audiences polled by CinemaScore gave the film an average grade of "B+" on an A+ to F scale.

== See also ==
- List of Christmas films
- Unaccompanied minor
