= Patrick Renna =

American actor

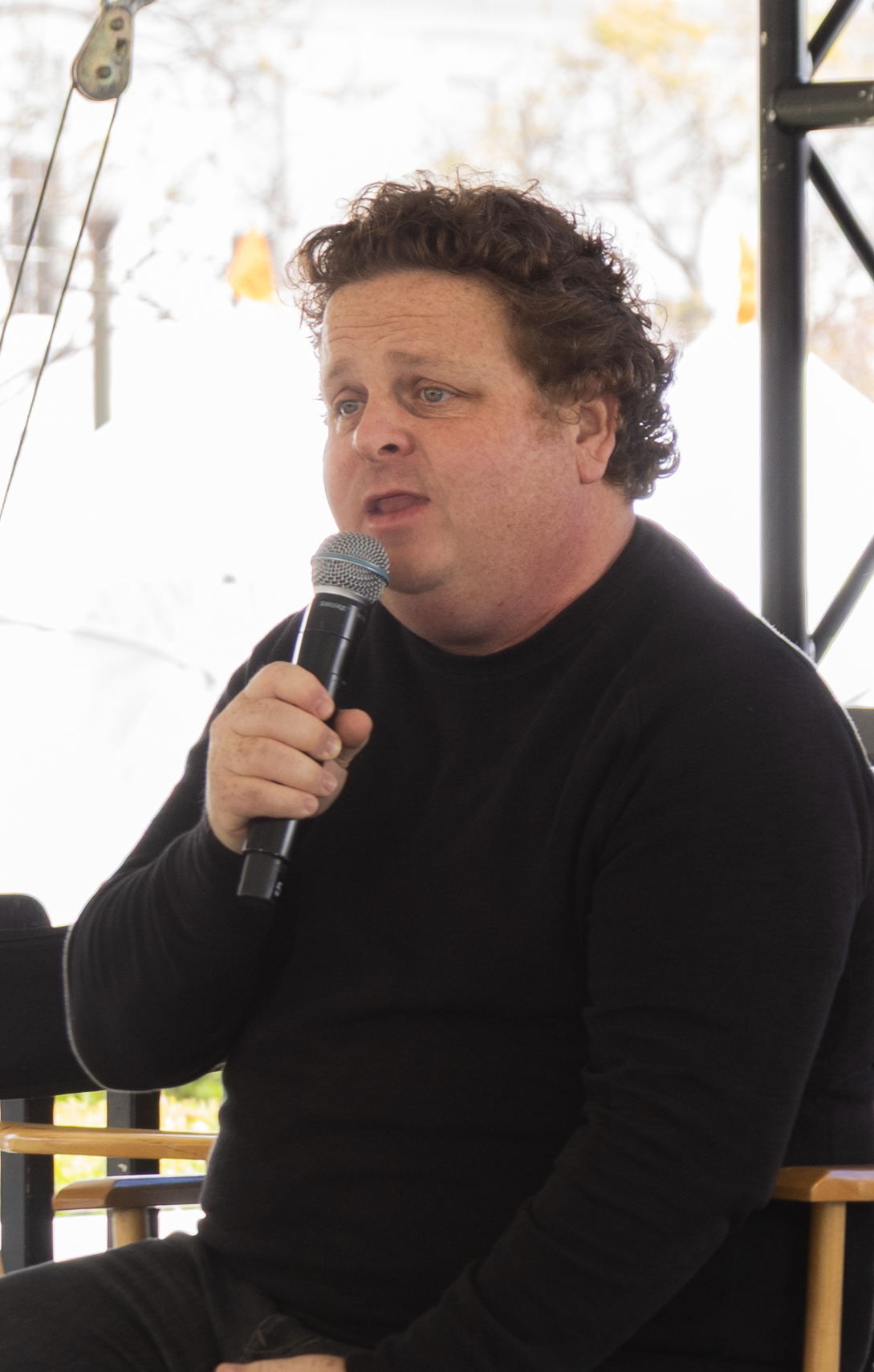
- Renna in 2025
- Born: Patrick Maxwell Renna; March 3, 1979 (age 47); Boston, Massachusetts, U.S.
- Occupations: Actor; film producer
- Years active: 1992–present
- Spouse: Jasmin Renna
- Children: 3
- Website: patrickrenna.com

Patrick Maxwell Renna (born March 3, 1979) is an American actor and film producer best known for his role as Hamilton "Ham" Porter in the 1993 baseball film The Sandlot. Some of his later projects include Bad Roomies, his first film as a producer; a recurring role on Netflix's hit series GLOW; and the independent film Monster Summer, which released in 2024.

== Personal life ==
Renna was born on the North End of Boston on March 3, 1979. When he was three, Renna and his family moved to Watertown, Massachusetts, and then to the neighborhood of Dorchester, where he primarily grew up. As a child, Renna played Little League Baseball. He acted in a couple of plays in the Boston area. Renna decided to become an actor after his mother moved to Los Angeles and he joined her. The Sandlot was his first audition, in which Renna was the last to be cast.

Renna is married to Jasmin Renna, and they have three children. Renna and his wife are Scientologists and founded the Church of Scientology Mission of Los Feliz, located in Los Feliz, Los Angeles.

== Filmography ==
=== Film ===
- The Sandlot (1993) – Hamilton 'Ham' Porter
- Son in Law (1993) – Zack Warner
- Summertime Switch (1994) – Modem
- Beanstalk (1994) – Danny
- The Big Green (1995) – Larry Musgrove
- Blue River (1995) – Zoltan
- Johnny Mysto: Boy Wizard (1996) – Glenn
- Sometimes They Come Back... Again (1996) – Young Alan
- Address Unknown (1997) – Bernie Libassi
- Falling Sky (1998) – Mark
- Born Bad (1999) – Evan
- The Secret Life of Girls (1999) – Patrick
- Speedway Junky (1999) – Bud
- Dill Scallion (1999) – Patrick
- P.U.N.K.S. (1999) – Lanny Nygren
- Everyday (1999) – Buddy Holly Death Worried Guy
- Poor White Trash (2000) – Ricky Kenworthy
- Very Mean Men (2000) – Donny Mulroney
- Ricky 6 (2000) – Ollie
- Boys Klub (2001) – Country
- Recess: School's Out (2001) (voice) – Jerome
- The Contract (2002) – Jerry the clerk
- The Chocolate Fairy (2002) – Bad Boy
- National Lampoon Presents Dorm Daze (2003) – Styles McFee
- Golf Cart Driving School (2004) – Gene
- Gamebox 1.0 (2004) – Kaplan
- The Sandlot 2 (2005) – Hamilton 'Ham' Porter, Flashback scene
- Dark Ride (2006) – Bill
- Life Blood (2009) – Dan
- Bad Roomies (2015)
- Lavalantula (2015) – Chris
- Fear, Inc. (2016)
- Monster Summer (2024) – Umpire
- You Gotta Believe (2024) – Kliff Young

=== Television ===
- Salute Your Shorts (1992) – Danucci Peed His Pants Kid, episode "Citizen Pinsky"
- Boy Meets World (1996) – Kyle
- Arliss (1996) – Delivery Man
- Home Improvement (1996), Todd, episode "Mr. Wilson's Opus"
- The X-Files (1998) – Ronnie Strickland, episode "Bad Blood"
- ER (1999) – Howie, episode "Truth & Consequences"
- Judging Amy (2002–2003) – Ronnie Thayer, 2 episodes
- The Closer (2005) – Jeffrey
- Over There (2005) – Medic, 2 episodes
- Boston Legal (2005–2007) – Warren Peters, 3 episodes
- CSI: Crime Scene Investigation (2007) – Security Guard
- Bones (2014) – Pete Dineen
- Hell's Kitchen (2017) – Himself
- GLOW (2018) – Cupcake

=== Music videos ===
- Houses – Fast Talk (2018) – Ronald Early
- Jax – "90s Kids" (2021) – Himself
