= The Sandlot: Heading Home =

- DVD cover
- Directed by: William Dear
- Written by: Keith Mitchell; Allie Dvorin
- Based on: Characters by David Mickey Evans; Robert Gunter
- Produced by: Jon Kuyper
- Starring: Luke Perry; Danny Nucci; Keanu Pires; Chauncey Leopardi; Sarah Deakins
- Cinematography: Pascal Provost
- Edited by: Chris Conlee
- Music by: Kendall Marsh
- Distributed by: 20th Century Fox Home Entertainment
- Release date: May 1, 2007
- Running time: 96 minutes
- Country: United States
- Language: English

The Sandlot: Heading Home is a 2007 American science fiction sports comedy film directed by William Dear and starring Luke Perry, Danny Nucci and Sarah Deakins. It is the third installment in The Sandlot franchise and a sequel to The Sandlot 2 (2005). It was released direct-to-video on May 1, 2007.

== Plot ==
In 2004, successful, but arrogant, baseball superstar Tommy "Santa" Santorelli of the Los Angeles Dodgers is knocked unconscious by a wild pitch after being blinded by a mistakenly launched fireworks display. Tommy wakes up 28 years in the past as his 13-year-old self in 1976. When Tommy attempts to explain his time travel to his mother Sara, she takes him to the doctor, with whom he quarrels. After Tommy leaves the office, the doctor and Sara discuss her being diagnosed with cancer.

Eventually, his mother sends him to play baseball with his friends Two-Ton, Ryan, Q, D.P., Wings, Timber, Wok, and Roll who all play on the sandlot baseball team. The next day, Tommy tells his story to teammate Ryan, and later protects him from local bully E.J. Needman, whose father, Earl, is planning to build condominiums on the Sandlot. After seeing the disrespectful attitude of E.J., Tommy decides to join the Sandlot team to put him in his place. Tommy instructs his teammates with the help of Benny and Squints, thereby winning several games. Needman proposes a baseball game to determine the fate of the Sandlot. Tommy joins Needman's team, but ultimately returns to that of his friends, and wins the game for them, saving the Sandlot. After the game, Tommy rushes home to Sara, who is growing weaker, telling her that he won. She tells Tommy she is proud of him. Outside, Ryan throws the game ball to Tommy claiming everyone wanted him to have it, he throws it knocking Tommy out and returning him to the present.

Upon his return to the present, he wakes up in Cedars-Sinai hospital being treated by Q who has become a doctor, and learns that instead of becoming an arrogant and disloyal player, he has remained loyal to the Dodgers his entire career. He has also married his girlfriend, Judy, and they have two children named Heather and Oliver. The biggest difference of all is that he stayed in communication with his old friends ever since this victory. Tommy then speaks to his mother's spirit, proud of who he has now become.

The movie ends with Benny Rodriguez explaining that Tommy had turned down a lot of money offers from teams over the years and remained a Dodger. But the one thing that Tommy treasures to this day is saving the Sandlot. A picture of Tommy and the Sandlot kids appears as a "forever" plays during the scene before the scene fades to the credits.

== Cast ==
- Danny Nucci as Benny Rodriguez, the sandlot team's coach and a member of the original sandlot team. Nucci replaces Mike Vitar from the original.
- Luke Perry as Tommy Santorelli, the main character, a successful but arrogant centerfielder baseball player.
  - Keanu Pires as Tommy's 13-year-old self
- Chauncey Leopardi as Michael "Squints" Palledorous, a member of the original sandlot team. Leopardi reprises his role from the original film.
- Sarah Deakins as Sara Santorelli, Tommy's single mother.
- Brandon Olds as Two-Ton, a husky outfielder.
- Cole Heppell as D.P., the catcher for the Sandlot team. Known to heckle his opponents.
- Kai James as Timber, the pitcher for the Sandlot team. At first unable to pitch to batters, he finds confidence under Benny and Tommy's tutelage.
- Ryan Drescher as Wings McKay, a speedy third baseman.
- Cainan Wiebe as Ryan, a younger member and left fielder of the sandlot team who is silent after the death of his father.
  - Dean Hinchey as (Adult) Ryan
- Meshach Peters as Quincy "Q" Washington, a younger outfielder member of the sandlot team who is the most intelligent on medical procedures.
  - Chris Shields as (Adult) Dr. Quincy Washington
- Samuel Patrick Chu as Matt "Wok" Wakamoto, the second baseman.
- Renzo Carbonel as Rolando "Roll" Alvarez, the first baseman.
- Alexander Ludwig as Earl "E.J." Needman Jr., a local bully pitcher and Tommy's rival who faces constant pressure from his father.
- Chris Gauthier as Officer Pork Chop, Two-Ton's uncle.
- Paul Jarrett as Earl Needman, E.J.'s father.
- Leila Johnson as Judy Santorelli, Tommy's ex-fiancée turned wife.

== Reception ==
Kevin Carr of 7M Pictures said it's "about what I expected for a direct-to-DVD second sequel". Heather Boerner of Common Sense Media gave the film four out of five stars, writing: "If you mixed Back to the Future with A Christmas Carol and sprinkled in a liberal dose of baseball fandom, you'd end up with this sweet, fun baseball movie that entertains while it instructs". David Cornelius of DVD Talk said, "While not as awful as most of these types of sequels, it offers nothing that comes close enough to matching the joy and wonder of the first film."

== See also ==
- List of baseball films
