= The Mudge Boy =

2003 film by Michael Burke

- Theatrical release poster
- Directed by: Michael Burke
- Screenplay by: Michael Burke
- Based on: Fishbelly White by Michael Burke
- Produced by: Elizabeth W. Alexander; Alison Benson; Randy Ostrow
- Starring: Emile Hirsch; Tom Guiry; Richard Jenkins
- Cinematography: Vanja Cernjul
- Edited by: Affonso Gonçalves
- Music by: Marcelo Zarvos
- Distributed by: Showtime Networks
- Release date: January 17, 2003 (Sundance)
- Running time: 94 minutes
- Country: United States
- Language: English
- Budget: $800,000
- Box office: $62,852

The Mudge Boy is a 2003 American drama film directed by Michael Burke, based on Burke's 1998 short film Fishbelly White which was featured in the compilation Boys Life 5. It stars Emile Hirsch, Tom Guiry, and Richard Jenkins. It was produced by Elizabeth W. Alexander and distributed by Showtime after its release at the 2003 Sundance Film Festival.

== Plot ==
In the past, Duncan Mudge's mom dies from a heart attack while riding her bike. In the current day, Duncan works with his grieving father Edgar on their poultry farm, where Duncan has developed a bond with most of the chickens. His relationship with his father has been split due to his father's depression. While riding his bike with one of the chickens on a rural path, he stops to pet a cow belonging to Perry Foley, whom he engages in a conversation with.

The next day, at church, Duncan interrupts Perry having sex in the bathroom with a girl named Tonya. Perry and his friends later arrive at a convenience store, where Duncan is refilling his tires. Tonya is with the group and comforts Duncan over his mother; she invites Duncan to go with them. Later, in Duncan's barn, Perry tells Duncan of one of his sexual encounters.

Duncan visits Perry again, who has a cut on his lip from his abusive father. Perry takes him swimming in a lake below a support bridge. Duncan begins to have feelings for Perry. Back at the farm, Perry asks about Duncan's parents and speaks about his lack of a role model growing up. Duncan then shows Perry how his mother taught him to soothe a chicken by putting its head into his mouth. Perry shames him for it, then goes home. Duncan later goes with Perry's friends to an outdoor party and finds Perry receiving fellatio from April. After the party, they examine his mother's belongings in the barn. Perry convinces him to put on his mother's wedding dress as a joke, which he does reluctantly. He then forces Duncan to fellate him, before he rapes him. Duncan's father catches him in the dress alongside Perry and is disgusted.

In the morning, Duncan stops digging a plot and is reprimanded by his father. His father resorts to burning his wife's belongings. At night, Duncan meets Perry in a tractor where Perry says they should not be friends. Duncan asks if he has thought about kissing him before Perry does so. Duncan kisses him again, while Perry tells him to stay away. At the convenience store, Perry and his friends steal Duncan's chicken and taunt him. Perry gives it back to Duncan and tells him to put the chicken's head in his mouth. While being tormented for doing so, Duncan bites off the chicken's head. His father later sees him arrive with the dead chicken, and responds by hugging him as Duncan breaks down in tears.

== Cast ==
- Emile Hirsch as Duncan Mudge
- Tom Guiry as Perry Foley
- Richard Jenkins as Edgar Mudge
- Pablo Schreiber as Brent
- Zachary Knighton as Travis
- Ryan Donowho as Scotty
- Meredith Handerhan as Tonya
- Beckie King as April

== Release ==
On January 17, 2003, The Mudge Boy premiered at the 2003 Sundance Film Festival and in 2003 and 2004 it made the rounds at several gay and lesbian and independent film festivals around the United States. The region 1 DVD was released on May 9, 2006.

== Critical reception ==
On the review aggregator website Rotten Tomatoes, 77% of 26 critics' reviews are positive. Metacritic, which uses a weighted average, assigned the film a score of 62 out of 100, based on 15 critics, indicating "generally favorable" reviews.

Roger Ebert from the Chicago Sun-Times called it "odd and intense, very well acted, and impossible to dismiss." Lisa Rose from The Star-Ledger said about it that "It's not an easy film to watch, but it is a memorable one."

== Awards ==
The Mudge Boy was nominated for a GLAAD Media Award and the Grand Jury Prize at the Sundance Film Festival. It won a Grand Jury Award LA Outfest.
