= Bill Allison (actor) =

American actor (1930–2016)

- Born: William John Allison; August 1, 1930
- Died: April 25, 2016 (aged 85); Las Vegas, Nevada, U.S
- Other name: Bill Allison
- Occupation: Actor
- Years active: 1995–2010

William Allison (August 1, 1930 – April 25, 2016) was a former casino owner and actor. Allison had appeared in many cameo roles, such as Ocean's Eleven as an old guard, but his acting experience started when he was hired as a consultant for the production of Martin Scorsese's 1995 film, Casino, due to his casino experiences. In Casino, Allison played the Latter-day Saint (Mormon) Bagman, John Nance, who was based on Jay Vandermark.

== Filmography ==
| Year | Title | Role | Notes |
|---|---|---|---|
| 1990s | Chicago Hope | Pit Boss #1 | Television series; episode not identified |
| 1995 | Casino | John Nance | |
| 2001 | Ocean's Eleven | Guard | |
| 2003 | High Roller: The Stu Ungar Story | Floorman | Listed in the article as Stuey, the film's alternative title |
| 2004 | CSI: Crime Scene Investigation | Old Man / Store Owner | Television series; one episode, credited as William Allison |
| 2004 | Paradise | Manny's Manager | Television film, credited as William Allison |
| 2008 | Yonkers Joe | Pit Boss | |
| 2010 | Blues of Life | Father | (final film role) |
| 2005 | Courage & Stupidity | Producer | Video |
