= Frank John Hughes =

American actor

- Born: November 11, 1967 (age 58)
- Occupation: Actor
- Years active: 1997–present

Frank John Hughes (born November 11, 1967) is an American film and television actor. He is best known for his portrayals of "Wild Bill" Guarnere in the HBO miniseries Band of Brothers, Tom Fox in Catch Me If You Can, Tim Woods in 24, and Walden Belfiore in The Sopranos.

== Career ==
After numerous stage productions, Hughes worked steadily in the New York independent film scene making his feature film debut in Robert Celestino's True Convictions. Since then, he has appeared in nearly one hundred films and TV shows.

His TV credits include Law & Order, Homicide: Life on the Streets, as Charley O'Banion in Dick Wolf's Players for NBC opposite Ice T; Boomtown, Monk, LAX, Curb Your Enthusiasm, as Tim Woods in seasons 7 and 8 of 24; and as Walden Belfiore in the final season of HBO's The Sopranos.

His film credits include Michael Bay's Bad Boys, starring Martin Lawrence and Wil Smith; the Sundance Film Festival hit Mr. Vincent; Able Ferrara's The Funeral; Steven Spielberg's Catch Me if You Can, where he starred opposite Tom Hanks and Leonardo DiCaprio; the Tom Hanks and Steven Spielberg, Emmy Award-winning HBO mini-series Band of Brothers, where he received worldwide acclaim for his performance as Wild Bill Guarnere. He appeared in Scott Thomas's 2001 Deranged aka Anacardium as "Rich".

In 2011, Hughes wrote and co-starred with Rick Gomez in the film Leave and also wrote 2012's The Dark Tourist starring Michael Cudlitz and Melanie Griffith.

In 2021, Hughes portrayed Frank Sinatra in the Paramount+ series The Offer, directed by Dexter Fletcher, and went on to appear in 2024's The Featherweight, produced by Leonardo DiCaprio's Appian Way and starring James Madio, which premiered at the Venice Film Festival.

In 2013, Hughes' script Pox Americana broke the top ten on the prestigious Black List, resulting in a two-picture deal with Warner Brothers.

=== Filmography ===
==== Television ====
As actor

Year	Title	Role	Network	Notes
1997	Law & Order	Mike Bodak	NBC	Episode "We Like Mike"
1997–1998	Players	Charlie O'Bannon	NBC	18 episodes
2001	Band of Brothers	William "Wild Bill" Guarnere	HBO	Based on true events, involving the "Easy" Company 2nd Battalion in the United States Military during WWII.
2004	LAX	Henry Engels	NBC	13 episodes
2007	The Sopranos	Walden Belfiore	HBO	5 episodes
2009-2010	24	Tim Woods	Fox	24 episodes
2010	Criminal Minds	Detective Jake Moreland	CBS	Episode "Public Enemy"
2022	The Offer	Frank Sinatra	Paramount+	

Other appearances include: Cover Me, Law & Order, Homicide: Life on the Street, Feds, Without a Trace, Monk, Boomtown, Kings of South Beach, Curb Your Enthusiasm, JAG, The Path to 9/11, Law & Order: Criminal Intent, NCIS, and Criminal Minds.

==== Video game ====
Year	Title	Developer	Publisher	Platform(s)	Notes
2005	Call of Duty 2: Big Red One	Treyarch	Activision	Nintendo GameCube, PlayStation 2, Xbox	Hughes provided multiple voiceover performances in the game.
