= Chauncey Leopardi =

American actor (born 1981)

- Born: June 14, 1981 (age 45)
- Occupation: Actor
- Years active: 1990–present
- Known for: Michael "Squints" Palledorous in The Sandlot; Alan White in Freaks and Geeks
- Spouse: Jennifer Leopardi (m. 2022) Stefani Leopardi (m. 2000; div. 2013)
- Children: 5

Chauncey Leopardi (born June 14, 1981) is an American actor known for playing Michael "Squints" Palledorous in the 1993 film The Sandlot and Alan White in the 1999 series Freaks and Geeks.

== Career ==
Leopardi began his career when he appeared in a commercial in Dallas. He eventually moved to Los Angeles, where his mother took him on auditions for film and television roles. He is best known for his role at 11 years old as Michael "Squints" Palledorous in the 1993 film The Sandlot.

Leopardi also made a single appearance in Boy Meets World, in the pilot episode. He also appeared as bully Alan White on the short-lived NBC series Freaks and Geeks and as the geeky Navy sailor, Kyle, on The CW network's Gilmore Girls. Leopardi appeared in various other films and television series, including the 1995 comedy Houseguest. In 2007, he reprised his role of "Squints" in the third installment of The Sandlot series, 14 years after the original film's release. During the late-1990s, Leopardi played a recurring role as Otto the Nome Prince in the ABC cartoon series The Oz Kids. In 2019, he appeared in the music video for the song "Homicide" by Logic featuring Eminem, lip syncing Logic's verses.

Outside of acting, Leopardi has worked in the cannabis industry.

== Personal life ==
Leopardi has been married twice and has five children. He lives in Los Angeles.

== Filmography ==
=== Film ===
Year	Title	Role	Notes
1991	Father of the Bride	Cameron	
1993	The Sandlot	Michael 'Squints' Palledorous	
1994	Huck and the King of Hearts	Huck	
1994	Broken Record	Leo	Short film
1995	Houseguest	Jason Young	
1995	Casper	Nicky	
1995	The Big Green	Evan Schiff	
1995	Safe	Rory White	
1996	Sticks & Stones	Mouth	
1997	Trojan War	Freshman	
1998	The Opposite of Sex	Joe	
1998	Permanent Midnight	Jerry at 16	
2001	Boys Klub	Mario	
2007	The Sandlot: Heading Home	Squints	
2013	Coldwater	Eddie	

=== Television ===
Year	Title	Role	Notes
1990	Christine Cromwell	Boy	Episode: "Only the Good Die Young"
1990	L.A. Law	Eric Perkins, Age 7	2 episodes
1990	The Girl of the Limberlost	Billy (The Hobo)	Television film; uncredited
1992	Evening Shade	Joel	Episode: "Father/Child Campout"
1992	Ring of the Musketeers	Stevie	Television film
1993	The Commish	Sam Alexowski	Episode: "Stoned"
1993	Boy Meets World	Nicholas Bornihay	Episode: "Pilot"
1996–1998	The Oz Kids	Otto (voice)	4 episodes
1996	Shadow Zone: The Undead Express	Zach	Television film
1997	The Larry Sanders Show	Charlie	Episode: "Make a Wish"
1998	7th Heaven	Todd's Friend	Episode: "Lead, Follow or Get out of the Way"
1999	Walker, Texas Ranger	Bobby Landrum	Episode: "Lost Boys"
1999	Snoops	Mike Johnson	Episode: "The Stolen Diskette"
1999–2000	Freaks and Geeks	Alan White	9 episodes
2003–2005	Gilmore Girls	Kyle	3 episodes
2005	CSI: Crime Scene Investigation	Lawrence Lafontaine	Episode: "4x4"
