= A Dangerous Woman (1993 film) =

1993 American film by Stephen Gyllenhaal

- Theatrical release poster
- Directed by: Stephen Gyllenhaal
- Screenplay by: Naomi Foner
- Based on: A Dangerous Woman by Mary McGarry Morris
- Produced by: Naomi Foner
- Starring: Debra Winger; Barbara Hershey; Gabriel Byrne; David Strathairn; Chloe Webb; John Terry; Laurie Metcalf
- Cinematography: Robert Elswit
- Edited by: Angelo Corrao; Harvey Rosenstock
- Music by: Carter Burwell
- Production companies: Amblin Entertainment; Island World; Rollercoaster Productions
- Distributed by: Gramercy Pictures
- Release date: December 3, 1993
- Running time: 102 minutes
- Country: United States
- Language: English
- Box office: $1,497,222

A Dangerous Woman is a 1993 American romantic drama film directed by Stephen Gyllenhaal. The screenplay was written by his wife Naomi Foner, loosely based on the novel of the same name by Mary McGarry Morris. The feature was co-produced by Amblin Entertainment and Gramercy Pictures. It stars Debra Winger, Barbara Hershey and Gabriel Byrne. It included Gyllenhaal and Foner's two children, Jake and Maggie, who later developed acting careers.

Winger was nominated for a Golden Globe Award for her performance and also won Best Actress at the Tokyo International Film Festival. A Dangerous Woman was released by Gramercy Pictures on December 3, 1993. The film has never been released on Region 1 DVD. It was once released on video in the United Kingdom by First Independent Films.

== Plot ==
Martha Horgan struggles to have a normal life in spite of being mentally challenged. She is fired from a job at the local dry-cleaner after accusations of stealing from the cash register. She believes the theft was done by Getso, the boyfriend of her colleague Birdie.

Depressed, Martha returns to Aunt Frances' home and discovers that a handyman, Mackey, has been hired to fix the porch of the main house. Aunt Frances plans to host a gala event for a local politician. Irate over her husband's affair with Frances, the politician's wife had driven into the porch and damaged it.

Mackey is kind to Martha. He defends her from Getso, who bullies and insults her, and smashes the windshield on Getso's van. She becomes increasingly fond of Mackey as time goes on. He recognizes Martha's feelings but does not take advantage of her.

One night Mackey returns drunk to Martha's home, lets himself in and proceeds to have sex with the eager Martha on her sofa. He later sleeps with Frances, who is also drunk, despondent following the gala. Her lover politician had reconciled with his wife and left with her at the end of the evening.

Mackey plans to leave as soon as he finishes the porch job, feeling guilty about being unfaithful to Martha, but she urges him to stay and tries to seduce him. He resists at first, then succumbs, then finally rejects her and throws her out. Despondent, Martha seeks her only friend, Birdie, for comfort; she goes alone to Birdie's home. There she finds Getso, who taunts and threatens her. Feeling cornered, Martha stabs him repeatedly with a sandwich knife. She stays and tries to comfort Getso as he dies from his wounds.

Frances and Mackey seek Martha at the police station where they are informed that she is pregnant and will likely be charged with murder and spend the rest of her life in jail. They find her overwhelmed with guilt over what she has done and resigned to her fate.

Frances, already suspicious of Getso, informs Martha that she is pregnant and that all she has to do is tell the police he raped her and she will be released. She refuses because it would be a lie but doesn't reveal that Mackey is the father of her child. Later, he again urges her to lie to save her life, but Martha instead insists that Mackey must take care of their child.

A final scene set in the near future reveals that Martha was remanded to a care facility where she is allowed to have day visits. Frances, Mackey, and her child are shown taking her away for just such a visit.

== Cast ==
- Debra Winger as Martha Horgan
- Barbara Hershey as Frances Beechum
- Gabriel Byrne as Colin "Mac" Mackey
- David Strathairn as Getso
- Chloe Webb as Birdie Drusser
- John Terry as Steve Bell
- Laurie Metcalf as Anita Bell
- Jan Hooks as the make-up saleslady
- Paul Dooley as the Tupperware salesman
- Viveka Davis as Mercy
- Richard Riehle as John
- Maggie Gyllenhaal as Patsy Bell
- Jake Gyllenhaal as Edward (as Jacob Gyllenhaal)

== Critical reception ==
Janet Maslin of The New York Times praised the film, especially Winger's acting and Gyllenhaal's direction, but found the film overall more akin to melodrama than drama:

A Dangerous Woman is soap opera... With Ms. Winger's eerily convincing performance as its centerpiece, the film creates a world of sexual chicanery that would do any television series proud... The film has been given an appealingly languid and intimate mood by the director, Stephen Gyllenhaal.

Rotten Tomatoes gives the film a rating of 47% from 15 reviews.

=== Controversy ===
The announcement of the nominations for the 9th Independent Spirit Awards, made by a committee of a governing body called the Independent Features Project West, was postponed due to a confusion over the eligibility of the film. The IFPW board determined that the film, which initially had received two nominations, had been partially funded by Universal Pictures and thus was not eligible, according to then-IFPW President Cathy Main; Gramercy Pictures is jointly owned by Universal Pictures and PolyGram Filmed Entertainment. In response, Gramercy Pictures President Russell Schwartz said the IFPW's rules "make no sense" and the IFPW is "as archaic as the (Academy of Motion Picture Arts and Sciences') foreign language rules". Schwartz also added that Universal's only involvement was to guarantee a bank loan to the filmmaker and its money was not used.
