= The Sandlot =

1993 film by David Mickey Evans and Robert Gunter

- Theatrical release poster
- Directed by: David Mickey Evans
- Written by: David Mickey Evans; Robert Gunter
- Produced by: Dale De La Torre; William S. Gilmore
- Starring: Tom Guiry; Mike Vitar; Patrick Renna; Chauncey Leopardi; Marty York; Brandon Adams; Grant Gelt; Shane Obedzinski; Victor DiMattia; Denis Leary; Karen Allen; James Earl Jones
- Narrated by: David Mickey Evans
- Cinematography: Anthony B. Richmond
- Edited by: Michael A. Stevenson
- Music by: David Newman
- Production company: Island World
- Distributed by: 20th Century Fox
- Release date: April 7, 1993
- Running time: 101 minutes
- Country: United States
- Language: English
- Budget: $7 million
- Box office: $34.3 million

The Sandlot is a 1993 American coming-of-age sports comedy film written by David Mickey Evans and Robert Gunter. Evans also directed the film and served as a narrator. It tells the story of a diverse group of young baseball players during Summer 1962. The film stars Tom Guiry, Mike Vitar, Karen Allen, Denis Leary, and James Earl Jones. It is set in the San Fernando Valley in Los Angeles, California, and the filming locations were in Midvale, Salt Lake City, and Ogden, Utah.

The Sandlot was released on April 7, 1993, by 20th Century Fox. The film grossed over $34 million worldwide, and was followed by two direct-to-video sequels The Sandlot 2 (2005) and The Sandlot: Heading Home (2007).

== Plot ==
In 1962, Scott "Scotty" Smalls moves to the San Fernando Valley with his unnamed mother and new stepfather, Bill. When Smalls's mother encourages him to make friends, he tries joining a group of eight boys— the talented leader Benjamin Franklin "Benny" Rodriguez, heavyset short-tempered Hamilton "Ham" Porter at catcher, smart-alecked Alan "Yeah-Yeah" McClennan at shortstop, African-American easygoing Kenny "The Heater" DeNunez at pitcher, nerdy wisecracking Michael "Squints" Palladorous in right field, rebellious Bertram Grover Weeks at 2nd base, and brothers the repeater Tommy at third base and the hapless Timmy Timmons at 1st base—who play baseball daily at the neighborhood sandlot. Smalls leaves in embarrassment when everyone except Benny, the group's leader, laughs at his attempt to catch and throw a baseball. Benny later invites Smalls onto the team as a left-center outfielder, and helps him improve his skills and earn the other boys' respect.

The next day, Ham hits a home run into an adjacent backyard, angering the group. They stop Smalls from retrieving the ball and tell him about "the Beast", a large and fearsome English Mastiff—who is depicted as being an unnaturally large, monstrous dog—living behind the fence of Mr. Mertle. Over the years, many baseballs have previously gone over the fence, with the Beast claiming each of these.

One hot day, instead of playing baseball, the team goes swimming at the neighborhood pool. They end up getting kicked out forever after Squints fakes drowning so that the lifeguard, Wendy Peffercorn, kisses him while giving mouth-to-mouth resuscitation. The group later plays against a snooty rival Little League team and wins in a landslide. While celebrating their victory at a fair that night, all the boys get sick after chewing tobacco and riding the Trabant.

One day, Benny hits the cover off the team's only ball. With Bill away on business for a week, Smalls keeps the game going by borrowing his stepfather's prized baseball autographed by Babe Ruth. Unaware of its value, Smalls hits his first home run, sending it into Mr. Mertle's yard. When the team learns of the autograph, they explain to Smalls the ball's true value and who Babe Ruth was. They quickly forge Babe Ruth's signature on a new ball to be a temporary replacement while attempting to recover the autographed ball. However, the Beast thwarts every makeshift device they use for this goal.

That night, Benny has a dream in which he meets Babe Ruth. Ruth tells Benny, reluctant, to climb over Mr. Mertle's fence to get the ball back, which he does the next day. A standoff ensues between Benny and the Beast. Benny takes off, slides and grabs the ball, and runs away. The Beast, revealed to be a normal-sized dog, chases Benny through town. Benny outruns the dog all the way back to Mr. Mertle's yard, but the Beast crashes through the fence, which falls down on top of him. Smalls and Benny free the Beast, who gratefully licks Smalls's face and leads them to his stash of baseballs. The two meet Mr. Mertle, discovering that he is a retired baseball player, a friend of Babe Ruth, who went blind after being struck by a pitch. Mr. Mertle trades them the chewed-up ball for one autographed by all the 1927 Murderers' Row.

Bill loves the Murderers' Row ball but still punishes Smalls for stealing and ruining his Babe Ruth autographed ball. Their relationship nonetheless improves, and Smalls begins to call Bill "Dad". The sandlot boys appoint the Beast—whose real name is Hercules—as their mascot. As the years pass, they go their separate ways. Yeah-Yeah enlists in the army; Bertram disappears into the counterculture movement; Timmy and Tommy become an architect and a contractor; Squints marries Wendy, has nine kids with her, and the two run a local drugstore; Ham becomes a professional wrestler, "The Great Hambino"; Kenny plays Triple-A baseball before owning a business and coaching his sons' Little League team; and Benny earns the nickname "the Jet" after word spreads around about his encounter with the Beast.

As adults, Smalls is a sports commentator and Benny plays for the Los Angeles Dodgers. Smalls and the fans celebrate as Benny scores a game-winning run by stealing home plate. In his broadcast booth, Smalls owns and keeps on display the chewed-up Babe Ruth autographed ball, the Murderer's Row ball, the forged Babe Ruth ball, some pictures of Babe Ruth, and a large picture of the Sandlot kids from 1962.

== Cast ==
- Tom Guiry as Scott "Scotty" Smalls, the new kid in town, who later becomes a left fielder for the Sandlot team.
  - David Mickey Evans as adult Scott Smalls (narrator, voice-only, uncredited)
  - Arliss Howard as adult Scott Smalls (live action, uncredited)
- Mike Vitar as Benjamin Franklin "Benny" Rodriguez, the leader of the group, as well as the most dedicated and skilled member of the team.
  - Pablo Vitar as adult Benny "The Jet" Rodriguez
- Patrick Renna as Hamilton "Ham" Porter, a sarcastic, short-tempered catcher.
- Chauncey Leopardi as Michael "Squints" Palledorous, a story-telling, snarky rightfielder.
- Marty York as Alan "Yeah-Yeah" McClennan, a smart-mouthed shortstop.
- Brandon Quintin Adams as Kenny DeNunez, an easygoing pitcher, known for his "Heater" pitch.
- Grant Gelt as Bertram Grover Weeks, a fun-loving second baseman.
- Victor DiMattia as Timmy Timmons, a hapless first baseman and Tommy's older brother.
- Shane Obedzinski as Tommy "Repeat" Timmons, a thirdbaseman and Timmy's sweet younger brother.
- Denis Leary as Bill, Scotty's stepfather
- Karen Allen as Scotty's mother
- James Earl Jones as Mr. Mertle, a former player who now resides near the Sandlot, and owner of "The Beast".
- Art LaFleur as Babe Ruth "The Great Bambino", a former best-known baseball star player of the New York Yankees who appears in Benny's dream to give wisdom to him on rescuing the prized baseball from "The Beast"
- Marley Shelton (credited as Marlee Shelton) as Wendy Peffercorn, lifeguard at the local pool, and target of Squints's crush.
- Wil Horneff as Little League team leader Phillips

== Production ==
The film was announced in 1991, with Danny DeVito, Michael Shamberg, Richard Donner, and Lauren Shuler Donner trying to buy the rights to the screenplay and produce the film. Eventually Island World won the rights, and hired David Mickey Evans to direct the script he co-wrote with Robert Gunter. Filming began in June 1992 in Salt Lake City, Utah.

== Reception ==
=== Critical response ===
On Rotten Tomatoes, the film holds an approval rating of 66% based on 65 reviews, with an average rating of 6.2/10. The site's critical consensus reads, "It may be shamelessly derivative and overly nostalgic, but The Sandlot is nevertheless a genuinely sweet and funny coming-of-age adventure". Metacritic assigned that the film had a weighted average score of 55 based on 27 critics, indicating "mixed or average reviews". Audiences polled by CinemaScore gave the film an average grade of "B+" on an A+ to F scale.

Critic Roger Ebert gave the film three (out of four) stars, comparing the film to a summertime version of A Christmas Story, based on the tone and narration of both films: "There was a moment in the film when Rodriguez hit a line drive directly at the pitcher's mound, and I ducked and held up my mitt, and then I realized I didn't have a mitt, and it was then I also realized how completely this movie had seduced me with its memories of what really matters when you are 12". Bob Cannon of Entertainment Weekly gave the film a B+, praising its simplicity and strong fundamentals.

Leonard Klady of Variety gave the film a mostly negative review. He praised the cinematography and score, but felt that the baseball team did not come together, and that the film, while sincere, was a "remarkably shallow wade, rife with incident and slim on substance".

=== Box office ===
The film grossed $4,000,000 in its opening weekend and a further $32,000,000 through ticket sales. Figures for world-wide VHS and DVD sales are estimated to be at $76,000,000. Since its release on both VHS and DVD, the film has become a cult favorite.

=== Defamation suit ===
In 1998, Michael Polydoros sued 20th Century Fox and the producers of the film for defamation. Polydoros, a childhood classmate of David Mickey Evans, the writer and director of The Sandlot, claimed that the character Michael "Squints" Palledorous was derogatory and caused him shame and humiliation. The trial court found in favor of the film-makers, and that finding was affirmed by the California Court of Appeal. After initially agreeing to review the case in 1998, the Supreme Court of California reversed its decision, dismissing the review and reinstating the Court of Appeal's opinion in favor of 20th Century Fox.

=== Home media ===
In 1993, The Sandlot first came to home video in a slipcase, along with the LaserDisc in widescreen, but later came in a clam shell case in 1994. On January 29, 2002, the DVD was released under Fox's Family Feature banner, in widescreen (Side B) and full screen (Side A); the 2013 repackaged DVD is widescreen only. The film was released on Blu-ray for the first time in March 2013 to celebrate its 20th anniversary. On March 27, 2018, the film then had a re-release on Blu-ray and Digital HD as part of the film's 25th anniversary.

== Sequels and prequel ==
- The Sandlot 2 (2005) – a direct-to-video sequel in which a new Sandlot gang is featured. The only returning cast member is James Earl Jones as Mr. Mertle. Evans also returned to direct the sequel and voiced Smalls' younger brother, Johnnie.
- The Sandlot: Heading Home (2007) – another direct-to-video sequel starring Luke Perry as Tommy "Santa" Santorelli who gets knocked back to 1976 from 2004 and relives his childhood. Chauncey Leopardi reprises his role as Squints.
- A prequel film was announced in July 2018.
- In 2019, a TV series with the original cast was in the works for Disney+, as a result of Disney's acquisition of 20th Century Fox. In November 2023, the series was cancelled due to the lengthy SAG-AFTRA strike.

== Soundtrack ==
The film's original score was composed by David Newman, and was not released until 2006, when a limited edition was released as part of the Varèse Sarabande CD Club. This release paired it with selections from Newman's score for The War of the Roses. Subsequently, in 2018 a remastered and expanded limited edition re-issue of the original motion picture score was published by La-La Land Records in observance of the film's 25th anniversary.

== See also ==
- List of baseball films
