= Island World =

Defunct American film production company

- Type: Conglomerate
- Industry: Film production company
- Founded: 1988; 38 years ago United States
- Founder: John Heyman
- Defunct: 1995; 31 years ago
- Fate: Tax Dormitory: Sold to WEA International; Reincorporated under Kushner-Locke Pictures
- Successor: Island Pictures
- Headquarters: United States
- Key people: Eric Eisner
- Products: Films
- Total assets: US$6.6million

Island World was an independent film company founded by British financier John Heyman and producer Chris Blackwell.

It shut down in 1995 after producing The Cure.

== Films ==
- Toy Soldiers (1991, Tri-Star Pictures - First film produced)
- Strictly Business (1991, Warner Bros. Pictures)
- Juice (1992, Paramount Pictures)
- Carry On Columbus (1992, United International Pictures)
- Laws of Gravity (1992, RKO Pictures)
- American Heart (1992, Triton Pictures)
- Amongst Friends (1993, Fine Line Features)
- Watch It (1993, Skouras Pictures)
- The Sandlot (1993, 20th Century Fox)
- A Dangerous Woman (1993, Gramercy Pictures)
- Airheads (1994, 20th Century Fox)
- The War (1994, Universal Pictures)
- The Cure (1995, Universal Pictures - Last film produced before Island Pictures succession)

== Television ==
- Untiled The Sandlot TV series
