= Brandon Adams (actor) =

American actor (born 1979)

- Born: Brandon Quintin Adams; August 22, 1979 (age 47); Topeka, Kansas, U.S.
- Other name: Brandon Q. Adams
- Occupation: Actor
- Years active: 1986–present

Brandon Quintin Adams (born August 22, 1979) is an American actor, known for having played Jesse Hall in the first two Mighty Ducks movies and Kenny DeNunez in The Sandlot. He also played Jimmy Bean in the 1989 film Polly.

== Career ==
Adams has also appeared in The Fresh Prince of Bel-Air, A Different World, Moesha, Sister, Sister, Martin, Michael Jackson's Moonwalker where he played Zeke in the "Smooth Criminal" segment and Young Michael in the "Badder" segment, a parody of Jackson's classic video for "Bad", and was the leading actor in Wes Craven's The People Under the Stairs. He also provided the voice of Rai in Kingdom Hearts II.

== Filmography ==
=== Film ===
Year	Title	Role	Notes
1988	Moonwalker	Michael "Badder" / Zeke	
1989	Polly	Jimmy Bean	TV film
1991	The People Under the Stairs	Fool	
1992	The Mighty Ducks	Jesse Hall	
1993	The Sandlot	Kenny DeNunez	
1993	Ghost in the Machine	Frazer	
1994	D2: The Mighty Ducks	Jesse Hall	
1994	Beyond Desire	Vic Delgado	
2001	MacArthur Park	Terry	

=== Television ===
Year	Title	Role	Notes
1986	Benson	Phil	Episode: "Last Man on Earth"
1988, 1990	Empty Nest	Georgie / Peter	2 episodes
1989	Quantum Leap	Older Brother	Episode: "Camikazi Kid"
1989	The Magical World of Disney	Jimmy Bean	Episode: "Polly"
1989–1991	A Different World	Dion / Tino	5 episodes
1991	Sunday in Paris	Brandon Chase	
1991	Drexell's Class	Oscar	Episode: "Air Drexell"
1991, 1994	The Fresh Prince of Bel-Air	Bryan / Ramon	2 episodes
1992	Nightmare Cafe	Luke Wall	Episode: "Sanctuary for a Child"
1992	The Boys	Marcus	Television film
1993	Martin	Boy #2	Episode: "Blackboard Jungle Fever"
1993	Crime & Punishment	Harold Carr	Episode: "Right to Bear Arms"
1993	South Beach	TJ	Episode: "I Witness"
1994	Roc	Terrance	Episode: "Terrance Got His Gun"
1995	Boy Meets World	Alex	Episode: "I Am Not a Crook"
1995	Sister, Sister	Michael	2 episodes
1996	The Burning Zone	D-Ray Drummond	Episode: "The Silent Tower"
1998–2001	Moesha	Aaron	4 episodes
2021	The Resort	Narrator	

=== Video games ===
Year	Title	Role
2005	Kingdom Hearts II	Raijin (Rai)
2007	Kingdom Hearts II: Final Mix+	Raijin (Rai)
