= Cole Heppell =

Canadian actor (born 1993)

- Born: November 11, 1993 (age 32); Calgary, Alberta, Canada
- Occupation: Actor
- Years active: 2004–2012

Cole Heppell (born November 11, 1993) is a Canadian actor. In 2006, he was nominated for a Young Artist Award for Best Performance in a Television Series (Comedy or Drama) - Guest Starring Young Actor for: The Dead Zone: Heroes & Demons.

In 2012, Heppell was nominated at the 33rd Young Artist Awards for his supporting role as the village fool in Red Riding Hood. He studied at the University of Alberta.

== Filmography ==
Films

Year	Film	Role
2005	The Fog	Andy Wayne
2007	The Sandlot 3	D.P.
2007	BloodRayne II: Deliverance	William
2010	Diary of a Wimpy Kid (film)	Quentin's Sidekick
2011	Red Riding Hood	Claude

TV series

Year	Series	Role	Episodes
2004	The Dead Zone	Zeke	1
2005	The Dead Zone	Thaddeus Fallon - Age 12	1
2006	Fear Itself	Tim Edlund	1
