= Robert Celestino =

American film producer

- Occupation: Film editor

Robert John Celestino is an American film producer, screenwriter, editor and film director. He is best known for his films such as Mr. Vincent and Yonkers Joe.

== Films ==
Mr. Vincent premiered at the 1997 Sundance Film Festival. It won the Critics' Award for best film at the Scermi di Amore Film Festival and the Best Dramatic Feature Award at the Long Island Film Festival.

In 2008 Celestino wrote and directed Yonkers Joe which stars Chazz Palminteri, Christine Lahti, Tom Guiry, Linus Roache and Michael Lerner. The film tells the story of a dice hustler whose determination to make one last grab in Vegas is complicated by the reappearance of his estranged son into his life. Yonkers Joe premiered at the 2008 Tribeca Film Festival and is distributed by Mark Cuban's Magnolia Pictures.

Leave, a psychological thriller starring Frank John Hughes, Rick Gomez, Vinessa Shaw, Bryan Cranston and Ron Livingston was released in 2010.

Robert's films also include No Promises, X-Factor – Portrait of a Stuntman and Stone's Law. In television, he wrote and directed the pilot episode for Alternate Realities.
