= David Mickey Evans =

American film director and screenwriter

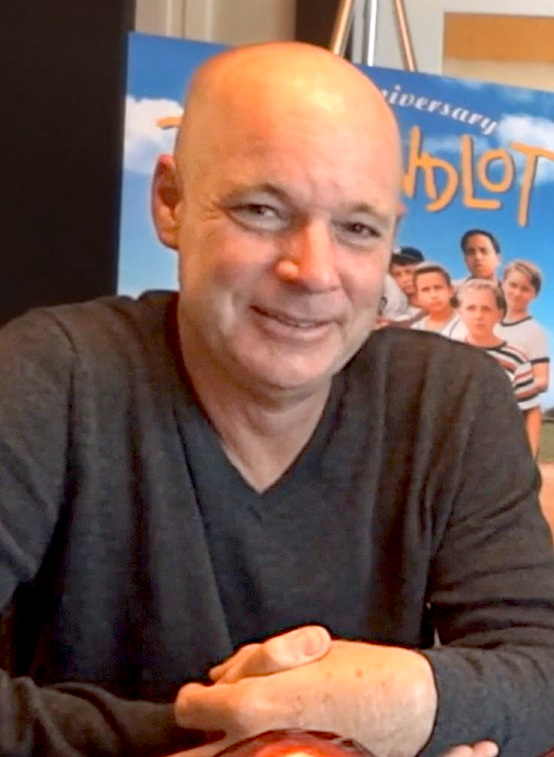
- Evans in 2013
- Born: October 20, 1962 (age 63); Wilkes-Barre, Pennsylvania, U.S.
- Occupations: Film director; screenwriter
- Years active: 1987–present

David Mickey Evans (born October 20, 1962) is an American film director and screenwriter. His films tend to focus on children and the challenges of childhood. A baseball fan, Evans directed and co-wrote The Sandlot (1993).

== Life and career ==
Evans was born in Wilkes-Barre, Pennsylvania on October 20, 1962. In 1980, he moved to Los Angeles for college. Evans attended Loyola Marymount University and graduated with a film degree in 1984. He got his start writing action-thriller films, but found his niche in the 1990s with family-oriented films that appealed to adults, children and critics alike.

Evans became one of the highest paid screenwriters during this time, selling the screenplays to both Radio Flyer and The Sandlot for over $1,000,000 each. The former was originally to be directed by Evans, but he was replaced by Richard Donner due to his inexperience. Reshoots followed after poor test screenings and the film budget jumped from $15,000,000 to $30,000,000. The original script called for more fantasy sequences involving a worm man and zombies, but these ideas were scrapped when Richard Donner replaced Evans. Radio Flyer opened to mostly mixed reviews from critics while The Sandlot received much more positive reviews and better box office results.

Success for Evans became fleeting by the late 1990s, with films like First Kid and Ed bombing with critics and at the box office. He switched to more adult-oriented humor and material with After School Special, but did not fare much better. Since then, Evans has written and directed numerous made-for-TV and direct-to-DVD films, including The Sandlot 2.

== Filmography ==
Film
Year	Title	Director	Writer	Notes
1987	Open House	No	Yes	
1987	Terminal Entry	No	Yes	
1992	Radio Flyer	No	Yes	Also executive producer
1993	Journey to the Center of the Earth	No	Yes	TV movie Also executive producer
1993	The Sandlot	Yes	Yes	Also narrator
1996	Ed	No	Yes	
1996	First Kid	Yes	No	
1999	My Teacher, My Friend	Yes	Yes	Also narrator
2000	Beethoven's 3rd	Yes	No	
2001	Beethoven's 4th	Yes	No	Also actor:Hammet
2003	National Lampoon's Barely Legal	Yes	No	Also associate producer and actor: Dave
2003	My Teacher, My Friend II	Yes	Yes	Also narrator
2003	Wilder Days	Yes	No	TV film
2004	Mickey, Donald, Goofy: The Three Musketeers	No	Yes	
2005	The Sandlot 2	Yes	Yes	Also narrator
2007	The Final Season	Yes	No	
2009	Ace Ventura Jr.: Pet Detective	Yes	Yes	
2010	Tranced	Yes	No	
2011	Glastonbury: Isle of Light	Yes	No	
2012	Smitty	Yes	No	
