= Tom Guiry =

American actor (born 1981)

- Born: Thomas John Guiry; October 12, 1981 (age 44); Toms River, New Jersey, U.S.
- Occupation: Actor
- Years active: 1992–present
- Spouse: Janelle Bloodsworth (m. 2009)
- Children: 3

Thomas John Guiry (born October 12, 1981) is an American actor. He is best known for his lead performance as Scott "Scotty" Smalls in the coming-of-age film The Sandlot, which was filmed when he was 12, and his role in NBC crime drama The Black Donnellys. Guiry has appeared in numerous high-profile films and television series, including U-571, Black Hawk Down, Mystic River, Black Irish, and The Revenant.

== Early life ==
Guiry was born in Toms River, New Jersey, and attended St. Gregory the Great school in Hamilton Township, Mercer County, New Jersey from kindergarten through eighth grade, and then high school at Notre Dame High School in Lawrenceville, New Jersey.

== Career ==
Guiry's most notable appearances were in The Sandlot (1993), Lassie (1994), The Four Diamonds (1995), U-571 (2000), The Mudge Boy (2003), Black Hawk Down (2001), Mystic River (2003), Black Irish (2007) and The Revenant (2015). He played Jimmy Donnelly on the NBC drama The Black Donnellys.

== Personal life ==
In 2009, Guiry married his wife, Janelle, at the Crown Reef in Myrtle Beach, South Carolina. In August 2013, he was arrested at George Bush Intercontinental Airport in Houston, Texas, for allegedly head-butting a police officer after he was told he was too drunk to board a flight. On June 2, 2024, Guiry was arrested in Horry County, South Carolina for throwing a dumbbell that weighed 35 pounds (16 kg) onto a neighbor's Jeep.

== Filmography ==
=== Film ===
Year	Title	Role	Notes
1993	The Sandlot	Scotty Smalls	
1994	Lassie	Matthew Turner	
1996	The Last Home Run	Young Jonathan	
1998	Wrestling with Alligators	Pete	
1998	All I Wanna Do	'Frosty' Frost	
1999	Ride with the Devil	Riley Crawford	
2000	U-571	Trigger	
2000	Tigerland	Pvt. Cantwell	
2001	Scotland, PA	Malcolm Duncan	
2001	Black Hawk Down	Yurek	
2003	The Mudge Boy	Perry Foley	
2003	Justice	The Red Anarchist	
2003	Mystic River	Brendan Harris	
2005	Strangers with Candy	P John	
2005	The Sandlot 2	Scotty Smalls	Flashback scene
2006	Steel City	PJ Lee	
2006	Bristol Boys	Little Man	
2007	Black Irish	Terry McKay	
2007	Prisoner	Bob	
2008	Yonkers Joe	Joe Jr.	
2011	The Bandit	Danny Wilson	
2012	The Fitzgerald Family Christmas	Cyril Fitzgerald	
2014	Mahjong and the West	Stewart	
2015	The Revenant	Billy Brother Trapper	
2016	Culling Hens	William	
2017	Brawl in Cell Block 99	Wilson	
2017	Sollers Point	Aaron	
2017	Wonder Wheel	Flirtatious Man at Ruby's	
2020	The Prom	James Cordon	
2021	Roe v. Wade	James T. McHugh	
2021	The Unforgivable	Keith Whelan	

=== Television ===
Year	Title	Role	Notes
1993	A Place to Be Loved	Gregory K	Television film
1995	The Four Diamonds	Christopher 'Chris' Millard	Television film
1998, 2008	Law & Order	Ryan Emerson / Kevin Stanton	2 episodes
2000	Songs in Ordinary Time	Norman Fermoyle	Television film
2002	We Were the Mulvaneys	Judd Mulvaney, Narrator	Television film
2002	Law & Order: Special Victims Unit	Gavin Sipes	Episode: "Disappearing Acts"
2004	Strip Search	Gerry Sykes	Television film
2004	The Jury	Carl Donner	Episode: "Memories"
2006	Law & Order: Criminal Intent	Marcus Randolph	Episode: "The Good"
2007	The Black Donnellys	Jimmy Donnelly	13 episodes
2009	CSI: Miami	Doug Benson	Episode: "Head Case"
2009	Kings	Ethan Shepherd	2 episodes
2011	Unforgettable	Ken Herbert	Episode: "Pilot"
2013	Elementary	Brent Garvey	Episode: "Dead Man's Switch"
2017	Chicago Justice	Eric Cates	Episode: "Fool Me Twice"
