= Mary McGarry Morris =

American dramatist

- Born: February 10, 1943 (age 83); Meriden, Connecticut, U.S.
- Occupations: Novelist; short story author; playwright
- Spouse: Michael W. Morris
- Children: 5

Mary McGarry Morris (born February 10, 1943) is an American novelist, short story author and playwright from New England. She uses its towns as settings for her works. In 1991, Michiko Kakutani of The New York Times described Morris as "one of the most skillful new writers at work in America today"; The Washington Post has described her as a "superb storyteller"; and The Miami Herald has called her "one of our finest American writers".

She has been most often compared to John Steinbeck and Carson McCullers. Although her writing style is different, Morris also has been compared to William Faulkner for her character-driven storytelling. She was a finalist for the National Book Award and PEN/Faulkner Award for Fiction. As of 2011, Morris has published eight novels, some of which were best-sellers, and numerous short stories. She also has written a play about the insanity trial of Mary Todd Lincoln.

== Published novels ==
Vanished, her first novel, was written over a 10-year period; only her husband and children knew that she was working at writing. It was rejected by numerous publishers and agents before agent Jean Naggar helped her sell it to Viking Press. It was published in 1988 to favorable reviews and was a finalist for the National Book Award and the PEN/Faulkner Award for Fiction.

Her 1991 novel A Dangerous Woman was named by Time as one of its Five Best Novels of the Year and as one of the best books of the year by American Library Association (ALA) Library Journal. Based on A Dangerous Woman, Morris won the Barnes and Noble Discover Great New Writers Award. The novel was adapted for a 1993 movie of the same name, which starred Debra Winger, Gabriel Byrne, David Strathairn, Barbara Hershey, Maggie Gyllenhaal and Jake Gyllenhaal.

Her 1995 novel (her third) Songs in Ordinary Time, sold one and one-half million copies, was a New York Times Bestseller, and a selection of Oprah's Book Club. It was adapted as a CBS television movie starring Sissy Spacek and Beau Bridges.

Her fourth novel, Fiona Range (2000), was published to critical acclaim. A reviewer for The New York Times Book Review stated Morris can "bring the ordinary to life with the sheer clarity of vision. She knows how a house with children in it sounds at night, what the heat and bustle in a kitchen feel like before a family dinner and how indiscretions arise in a dining room when everyone is flushed with wine."

Morris' fifth novel was entitled A Hole in the Universe (2004) and tells the story of a man returning to his community after having served 25 years in prison for murder. The Washington Post wrote:

"Morris is a master at sympathetic portraits of those clinging to the peripheries of society. And nowhere is her talent more evident than in her extraordinary new novel, A Hole in the Universe. Morris [is] a superb storyteller...and [her] undeniable compassion for and intuitive understanding of her characters' lives make us know and care about these people, too."

Her sixth novel, The Lost Mother (2005) was written from the perspective of a 12-year-old boy. He recounts his life after his mother leaves him, his sister and his father in the midst of the Great Depression. The Boston Globe described the book as "wonderful and absorbing", and The Washington Post wrote "The Lost Mother is the quietest, subtlest novel that ever kept me up into the small hours of the night, unable to look away."

Morris has said of The Lost Mother:

"Inspiration was easy because it was during those same years that my grandmother abandoned her husband and three children. The day she left, she brought her four-year-old daughter and youngest child, my mother, to a friend's house, then, dressed in her very best clothes, my grandmother climbed into a taxi and rode away forever. The image of that little girl watching from the window as her mother deserted her would come to me whenever there was sorrow in my mother's life. Forgiving by nature, my mother tried to understand what had happened, but because she felt such love and fierce loyalty to her own children, her mother's actions remained a painful, troubling mystery. Growing up, I was keenly aware of the loss my mother felt as well as the great love and admiration she had for her father, a quiet country man who raised his three children alone in those desperate times, often working day and night to support them."

Morris published her seventh novel, The Last Secret (2009); in an interview on NPR, she said that the idea for it came as she was listening to the song "Gimme Some Lovin'," written by Steve Winwood and members of the Spencer Davis Group. The Last Secret depicts the unraveling of the life of an accomplished suburban mother, who discovers her husband's betrayal, known by others, at the time a shameful secret surfaces from her own past.

Morris' eighth novel was Light from a Distant Star (2011). It drew comparisons to Harper Lee's To Kill a Mockingbird. It tells of a brutal murder and family love. At the center of the novel is 13-year-old Nellie Peck, a girl who wrestles with the meanings of loyalty, love and truth.

Morris's ninth novel, "The Silence" (2024), is about two women and a treacherous priest whose lives are forever linked by a childhood tragedy.

== Awards and honors ==
- Finalist, National Book Award, 1988
- Finalist, PEN/Faulkner Award for Fiction, 1989
- Five Best Books of 1991, Time
- Best Books of 1991, American Library Association Library Journal
- Barnes and Noble Discover Great New Writers Award, 1991
- Oprah Book Club Selection, 1997

== Biography ==
Morris was born in Meriden, Connecticut and raised in Rutland, Vermont. She resides in Andover, Massachusetts with her husband Michael W. Morris. They have five children, twelve grandchildren and one great-grandchild.

Her first novel, Vanished, was nominated for high awards. It was the first that many people knew she was working at writing. Before writing full-time, Morris had worked as a social worker for the Massachusetts Department of Public Welfare in Lawrence, Massachusetts. A number of her novels are set in fictional towns in Vermont while parts of Vanished, A Hole in the Universe and The Lost Mother are set in Massachusetts.

== Bibliography ==
- Vanished, 1988, Viking Press
- A Dangerous Woman, 1991, Viking Press
- Songs in Ordinary Time, 1995, Viking Press
- Fiona Range, 2000, Viking Press
- A Hole in the Universe, 2004, Viking Press
- The Lost Mother, 2005, Viking Press
- The Last Secret, 2009, Shaye Areheart Books
- Light from a Distant Star, 2011, Crown Publishing
