= The Sandlot 2 =

- DVD cover
- Directed by: David Mickey Evans
- Written by: David Mickey Evans
- Based on: Characters by David Mickey Evans; Robert Gunter
- Produced by: David Bixler
- Starring: James Willson; Max Lloyd-Jones; Samantha Burton; Brett Kelly; Cole Evan Weiss; Neilen Benvegnu; Sean Berdy; Jessica King; McKenzie Freemantle; James Earl Jones
- Cinematography: David Pelletier
- Edited by: Harry Keramidas
- Music by: Laura Karpman
- Production company: David Evans Pictures
- Distributed by: 20th Century Fox Home Entertainment
- Release date: May 3, 2005
- Running time: 97 minutes
- Country: United States
- Language: English

The Sandlot 2 is a 2005 American sports comedy film written, directed, and narrated by David Mickey Evans. It is the second film in The Sandlot franchise and a direct-to-DVD sequel to The Sandlot (1993). The film was followed by another sequel The Sandlot: Heading Home (2007).

== Plot ==
In a flashback to 1962, Benny becomes Benny "the Jet" Rodriguez. The story shifts to 1972, ten years after the events of The Sandlot. A new crop of five kids now reside in San Fernando Valley in Los Angeles and play baseball at the Sandlot. Johnnie Smalls, the younger brother of Scott Smalls, has heard the legend of a ferocious dog he calls "The Great Fear", that is one of The Beast's offspring and is owned by Mr. Mertle, who lives behind the Sandlot. David Durango becomes the leader of the team which consists of Tarquell, Mac, Saul, and his little brother, Sammy, referred to as "Fingers", because he is deaf. Behind the Sandlot, the Goodfairer family lives next to Mr. Mertle.

A new girl in the neighborhood named Hayley Goodfairer, and her two friends, Jenny and Penny, compete with the boys over sharing the Sandlot. When the girls refuse to leave, Johnnie suggests sharing it, which everyone but David agree to. The girls are amazing softball players, and Johnnie asks them to join their team. The kids play a game with a little league team led by David's rival, Singleton, to determine who gets the Sandlot. When Singleton purposely hits Hayley, David punches him in retaliation and forces Singleton and his team to permanently vacate the Sandlot.

One day, Mac hits the ball over the junk wall with his new aluminum bat he got as a birthday present. As the group is about to go through a hole in the fence to retrieve it, Johnnie stops them and tells them the story of "The Great Fear". He says there was a little kid who loved the comic book hero, Rapid Rocket, and believed he could run as fast. One day, the boy walked past Mr. Mertle's house, but Mertle had forgotten to lock the backyard gate the night before. The Great Fear got out and chased the boy. It is unknown what happened to the boy, but soon after, Mr. Mertle built a wall of assorted junk to keep his dog in. If anything went over the fence, nothing came out.

Johnnie accidentally launches a model Space Shuttle that was built by Hayley's NASA engineer father. It lands in Mr. Mertle's backyard, and Hayley and the others frantically think of ways to retrieve it. They hire a boy called the "Retriever", though he fails to get it and goes home. Like Benny from the first movie, David decides to go over the wall to retrieve the model. Here, it is revealed that the little boy who was bitten by "The Great Fear" in the story was David. He retrieves the space shuttle and escapes unscathed. The Sandlot kids soon discover (just like The Beast did) that The Great Fear has gotten loose. David hops on his bike and is chased by the Great Fear. David rides through a construction site, then gets off his bike and runs back to the sandlot.

David hops over the junk wall back to Mr. Mertle's yard and falls through the tunnel that Mac used while trying to get the shuttle back. The dog knocks over the wall and saves David from suffocating. When David defeats the dog, Mr. Mertle appears, describing the situation to be like that of 10 years ago when a similar ordeal happened with the characters in the first film. It is revealed that the dog's real name is Goliath. The kids eventually realize that Goliath only wanted to get out so he could visit a neighboring female dog. As the kids depart, Hayley and David share a kiss. Mr. Mertle, tired of kids thinking he is grouchy, will not build a new fence. The kids grow up and part ways. Hayley and David meet again as adults and get married.

== Cast ==
- Max Lloyd-Jones as David "Rocket" Durango
- James Willson as Johnnie Smalls
- Samantha Burton as Hayley Goodfairer
- Brett Kelly as Mac McKing
- Cole Evan Weiss as Saul Samuelson
- Neilen Benvegnu as Tarquell
- Sean Berdy as Sammy "Fingers" Samuelson
- Jessica King as Penny
- McKenzie Freemantle as Jenny
- Griffin Reilly Evans as The Retriever
- Reece Thompson as Singleton
- Teryl Rothery as Mrs. Goodfairer
- Greg Germann as Roger Goodfairer
- James Earl Jones as Mr. Mertle
- Steve Garvey as Little League Coach
- Austin Dunn as Kid David
- Barbara Kottmeier as Hot Young Lady
- Michael Antonakos as Boyfriend
- Celia Bond as Woman at Movie
- David Mickey Evans as Narrator aka the adult Johnnie Smalls
- Tom Guiry as Scott Smalls (flashback)
- Mike Vitar as Benjamin Franklin "Benny" "The Jet" Rodriguez (flashback)

== Reception ==
The film received mostly negative reviews. On review aggregation website Rotten Tomatoes, it holds a 40% rating based on 5 reviews, with an average rating of 4.7/10.

== Sequel ==
A sequel to the film, titled The Sandlot: Heading Home, was released direct-to-video on May 1, 2007.

== See also ==
- List of baseball films
