= Mike Vitar =

American actor (born 1978)

- Born: Michael Anthony Vitar; December 21, 1978 (age 47); Los Angeles, California, U.S.
- Occupation: Actor (1990–1997)
- Years active: 1992–1997

Michael Anthony Vitar (born December 21, 1978) is an American former actor who appeared as Benjamin Franklin "Benny the Jet" Rodriguez in The Sandlot (1993) and Luis Mendoza in the final two Mighty Ducks films. He started acting as a teenager when a casting manager spotted him in line for a ride at a school carnival. Vitar retired from acting after 1997.

== Filmography ==
- Diplomatic Immunity (1991/I) – Arturo
- Brooklyn Bridge (1 episode, 1991) – Anthony Gambuzza
- Sunset Grill (1993) – Luis
- The Sandlot (1993) – Benjamin Franklin "Benny the Jet" Rodriguez
- D2: The Mighty Ducks (1994) – Luis Mendoza
- NYPD Blue (1996) – Teenager
- D3: The Mighty Ducks (1996) – Luis Mendoza
- Chicago Hope (1 episode, 1997) – Carlos Lunes
- The Sandlot 2 (2005) - Benjamin Franklin "Benny the Jet" Rodriguez, Flashback scene

== Personal life ==
Vitar has two older siblings. His older brother, Pablo, played the older version of his character, Benny, in The Sandlot, after which he joined the Los Angeles Police Department in 1996. Pablo died of colon cancer on January 29, 2008. Vitar also has an older sister, Elizabeth.

Vitar attended St. Francis High School in La Cañada, California, from which he graduated in 1997. Starting in 1996, Vitar worked for Gerber Ambulance in Torrance as an EMT, from which he moved into his career as a firefighter. Since 2002, Vitar has been a firefighter for the Los Angeles Fire Department. He currently resides in Los Angeles.

=== Legal troubles ===
On Halloween, October 31, 2015, Vitar and two other firefighters confronted 22-year-old Samuel Chang, who was handing out candy in their neighborhood to trick-or-treaters. They wrongly accused him of handing out drug-laced candy, and then chased Chang, until catching him and pinning him to the ground. Vitar and another firefighter helped pin Chang to the ground, while another held him in a chokehold until Chang fell unconscious. They performed CPR until paramedics arrived, and Chang was hospitalized for weeks. Vitar and the others were charged with felony assault. Against the will of the Chang family, Vitar was allowed to plead no contest to a reduced charge of misdemeanor battery and was suspended without pay for six months. He has since returned to full duty.
