= Brett Kelly (actor) =

Canadian actor (born 1993)

- Born: October 30, 1993 (age 32); Vancouver, British Columbia, Canada
- Occupation: Actor
- Years active: 2001–present

Brett Edward Kelly (born October 30, 1993) is a Canadian actor known for his role as Thurman Merman in the 2003 film Bad Santa.

He appeared in Like Mike 2: Streetball, The Sandlot 2, Unaccompanied Minors, Trick 'r Treat, and reprised his role in the 2016 sequel Bad Santa 2. He was also a recurring cast member on the Canadian television series Family Law.

Kelly was born in Vancouver, British Columbia and lives in Surrey, British Columbia.

He was a contestant on the October 23, 2024 episode of Jeopardy!. He ended Double Jeopardy with 0 dollars, thus did not qualify for Final Jeopardy!, and therefore finished in third place.

== Filmography ==
Year	Title	Role	Notes
2001	Kill Me Later		
2001	Ladies and the Champ	Ted Slatske	
2001	Out Cold	Toby	
2002	Cheats	Sammy	
2003	Bad Santa	Thurman Merman	
2004	Dead Like Me	Francis Bischetti	
2005	The Sandlot 2	Mac McKing	
2006	Just a Phase	Jackson	
2006	Like Mike 2: Streetball	Rodney Rheingold	
2006	Birthdays and Other Traumas	Oscar Pitt	
2006	Unaccompanied Minors	Timothy 'Beef' Wellington	
2007	Masters of Horror	Young Joe	
2007	Trick 'r Treat	Charlie	
2008	Slap Shot 3: The Junior League	Dickie Dunn III	
2009	What Goes Up	Blastoff! Chorus	
2010	High School	Martin Gordon	
2016	Bad Santa 2	Thurman Merman	
2017	Supernatural	Clark's co-worker	Episode: "Lost and Found"
2021–2026	Family Law	Cecil Patterson	

== Awards and nominations ==
Year	Award	Nominated work	Result
2007	Young Artist Award for Best Young Feature Film Cast	Unaccompanied Minors	Nominated
2007	Leo Awards for Best Actor in a Short Drama	Birthdays and Other Traumas	Nominated
