= J. A. C. Redford =

American composer, arranger, orchestrator, and conductor

- Born: Jonathan Alfred Clawson Redford; July 14, 1953 (age 73); Los Angeles, California, U.S.
- Genre: Orchestra
- Occupations: Composer, arranger, orchestrator, conductor
- Instrument: Keyboards
- Years active: 1976–present
- Website: jacredford.com

Jonathan Alfred Clawson Redford (born July 14, 1953) is an American composer, arranger, orchestrator, and conductor. He is also the author of Welcome All Wonders: A Composer's Journey.

== Artistic development ==
A wide variety of musical influences marked Redford's youth, ranging from symphonic music and nineteenth-century opera to the Beatles, Frank Zappa, Joni Mitchell, Aaron Copland, the scores of classic film composers such as Bernard Hermann, and jazz artists like Dave Brubeck. According to Image Journal, such a panoply of interests makes Redford "an equal opportunity composer. The music that flows from his mind and heart can take shape as a piano quartet, a Christmas oratorio, or a film score."

In his teens, Redford played in and arranged music for rock 'n' roll bands. In his early twenties, Redford began scoring documentaries and educational films, learning the craft of composing for the cinema.

After moving to Los Angeles in the mid-1970s, Redford began to write scores for television, beginning as a co-composer for Starsky & Hutch. In the 1980s, when the American Federation of Musicians called a strike that caused a virtual shutdown of U.S. film and television recording, Redford used the opportunity to continue his musical education. He studied composition with Hal Johnson and conducting with Frederick Zweig, and he took a master class in film composition with Walter Scharf through the UCLA extension program. During this period, Redford wrote concert and chamber music as well. Some years later, Redford studied composition and counterpoint with operatic composer and film orchestrator Thomas Pasatieri.

== Career ==
From 1976 to the present, Redford has been concurrently writing music for film and television, the concert hall, chamber artists, choral ensembles, and the theater. In a 2009 article, Jérémie Noyer wrote, "It is that rich experience that makes Redford's music unique, drawing from an incredible array of influences ... J. A. C. Redford distinguishes himself from other film music composers by an incredible versatility, feeling as comfortable in pop music or jazz as in concert music."

Artists and ensembles that have performed his work include: Anne Akiko Meyers, Academy of St. Martin in the Fields, Joshua Bell, Liona Boyd, Cantus, Chicago Symphony, Debussy Trio, Israel Philharmonic, Kansas City Chorale, Los Angeles Chamber Singers, Los Angeles Master Chorale, New York Philharmonic, Phoenix Chorale, St. Martin's Chamber Choir, St. Paul Chamber Orchestra, Utah Chamber Artists, and Utah Symphony.

Redford's work for mixed chorus and orchestra, Homing, was commissioned by the American Choral Directors Association (ACDA) for its Raymond W. Brock Memorial Commission 2017. The work premiered on 8 and 9 March at Orchestra Hall in Minneapolis, in concerts for the ACDA National Conference 2017. The combined choir of 150 singers was drawn from the University of Minnesota Chamber Singers and the Minnesota Chorale, both under the direction of Kathy Saltzman Romey, and Magnum Chorum, led by Mark Stover. The choir was joined by the Minnesota Orchestra and the performances were conducted by Robert Spano, Music Director of the Atlanta Symphony Orchestra.

His music has been featured on programs at the Kennedy Center in Washington, D.C., the Lincoln Center in New York, Walt Disney Concert Hall in Los Angeles, St. Peter's Basilica in Rome, and London's Royal Albert Hall.

Redford has written the scores for more than three dozen feature films, TV movies, and miniseries, including The Trip to Bountiful, One Night with the King, What the Deaf Man Heard, Mama Flora's Family, as well as Disney's Oliver & Company, Newsies, The Mighty Ducks II, and The Mighty Ducks III. He has composed the music for nearly 500 episodes of series television, including multiple seasons of Coach and St. Elsewhere (for which he received Emmy nominations in 1984 and 1985).

His incidental music has been heard in theatrical productions at the Matrix Theater in Los Angeles and South Coast Repertory Theater in Costa Mesa, California, as well as on the American Playhouse series on PBS. Two of his musical comedies are published by Anchorage Press and performed frequently across North America.

Collaborating with other artists, Redford has orchestrated, arranged, or conducted for Academy Award-winning composers James Horner, Alan Menken, Randy Newman, and Rachel Portman, as well as for Terence Blanchard, Danny Elfman, Mark Isham, Thomas Newman, Marc Shaiman, and Cirque du Soleil's Benoît Jutras, on projects including The Little Mermaid, The Nightmare Before Christmas, The Perfect Storm, Avatar, The Amazing Spider-Man, The Help, The Iron Lady, Skyfall, 1917, and Pixar's WALL-E and Finding Dory. He has written for and recorded with Grammy Award-winning artists Anne Akiko Meyers, Joshua Bell, Steven Curtis Chapman, Bonnie Raitt, and Sting. He has produced, arranged, and conducted music for the Los Angeles Master Chorale, and served as a consultant for the Sundance Film Institute, a teacher in the Artists-in-Schools program for the National Endowment for the Arts, a guest lecturer at USC and UCLA, and on the Music Branch Executive Committees for the Academy of Motion Picture Arts and Sciences and the Academy of Television Arts and Sciences.

== Reception and non-musical influences ==
According to Image Journal, "the thread running through all [of Redford's] music is an exuberant, melodic energy." David Vernier called Redford "a composer who knows how to write good tunes, engaging rhythms that capture the energy implied in the texts, and who knows how to pull the essential dramatic moments from a story and orchestrate them."

His music has been called evocative, intensely expressive, epic, beautifully orchestrated with an almost palpable sense of tenderness, and tuneful and lyric. His oratorio The Martyrdom of St. Polycarp reflects "a mix of styles—sometimes tonal, sometimes polytonal, with rich choral textures and superb orchestrations bringing depth of emotion and fine musical results." Redford's range makes his music at times "emotionally powerful, convey[ing] feelings of pain, anguish and sorrow" and at others "delightful and witty." When Redford worked alongside premier violinist Joshua Bell, CNN reported that Redford created "shimmering" arrangements for Bell's album, Voice of the Violin.

By setting four poems for an Easter Symphony, A Paschal Feast, Redford created a work at once "engaging ... forceful and joyous ... well-balanced and strong". William Goodfellow wrote of Redford's cantata Welcome All Wonders, "throughout the scoring is imaginative [and] the counterpoint ingenious." NPR’s Gene Parrish wrote of the same piece that his "careful selection and interpretation of his texts are matched by profound musical inspirations, and executed by well-crafted orchestrations and genuinely masterful choral writing."

Many of Redford's orchestral and chamber pieces are settings of poetry or sacred texts. Indeed, "poetry is nearly as important to me as music," Redford has stated. He has an abiding love for the marriage of music and text, most enjoying the work of poets who created a visceral rhythm with their language. Redford likes the challenge of setting such poems to music that would preserve the natural spoken rhythms of the words and reveal underlying meanings through dramatic shading and color, the tension between consonance and dissonance, counterpoint, and other musical techniques.

== Music for orchestra ==
- Symphony #2: A Plague Journal (2020) - A symphony for orchestra.
- Homing (2016) - A four-movement work for mixed chorus and orchestra to texts by J. A. C. Redford.
  - I dreamed last night that I fell fast asleep
  - Oh, be swift, my soul, to answer Him! be jubilant my feet
  - I weep for a world
  - This is the house of your long-exiled soul
- A Christmas Invitation (2015) - A Christmas triptych for mixed chorus and orchestra to texts by Malcolm Guite.
  - Fezziwig's Ball
  - Look! Look! O man, look at the world you make!
  - Christmas is the Lord's own day, Rejoice!
- Rest Now, My Sister (2011) - An elegy for mixed chorus and orchestra.
- I Saw the Cherubim (2011) - A setting for mixed chorus and orchestra of two sonnets by Roger Wagner.
- Morning Canticles (2011) - Canticles from the Book of Common Prayer for mixed chorus and orchestra:
  - Venite
  - Jubilate Deo
- In the Beauty of Holiness (2008) - A setting of combined passages from Psalms and 1 Chronicles for mixed chorus and orchestra.
- Glory (2008) - A Christmas anthem for mixed chorus and orchestra adapted from the second chapter of Luke.
- The Martyrdom of St. Polycarp (2004) - An oratorio for mixed chorus, soloists and orchestra to a libretto by Scott Cairns.
- Tidestar Pulling (2004) - An elegy for orchestra.
- arkexit (2002) - A divertimento for orchestra.
- The Story the Skin Tells (2000) - A work for orchestra from the score for subVersions, a site-specific modern dance work.
- Shepherd Story (1995) - A Christmas narrative for mixed chorus and orchestra adapted from the second chapter of Luke.
- Welcome All Wonders: A Christmas Celebration (1993) - A Christmas cantata for mixed chorus and orchestra.
  - Welcome All Wonders (Richard Crashaw)
  - Christmas Mourning (Vassar Miller)
  - The Nativity of Christ (Robert Southwell)
  - Good Is the Flesh (Brian Wren)
  - Christmas Now (Brian Wren)
- The Ancient of Days (1993/2007) - A dramatic music narrative for large orchestra and a speaker.
- Prologue: The Great Adventure (1992) - A fanfare for orchestra from Steven Curtis Chapman's 1992 Grammy Award-winning CD, The Great Adventure.
- St. Elsewhere (1990) - A suite from scores for the 1982–1988 television series.
- Symphony #1: A Paschal Feast (1988) - An Easter choral symphony for soprano, tenor and baritone soloists, mixed chorus and orchestra.
  - New Readings (Gerard Manley Hopkins)
  - Still Falls the Rain (Dame Edith Sitwell)
  - A Better Resurrection (Christina Rossetti)
  - He hath abolished the old drouth (Gerard Manley Hopkins)
- The Key to Rebecca (1988) - A suite from the score for the 1985 television mini-series.
- The Growing Season (1987) - Version for string orchestra.
- October Overtures (1980/2007) - A divertimento for orchestra. There is also a version for chamber orchestra.

== Chamber music ==
- Ordinary Saints (2018) - A song cycle and suite for soprano soloist and chamber ensemble.
- while half asleep and dreaming (2013) - A single movement work for string orchestra.
- Phantastes (2008) - A fantasia for solo piano.
- Via Gioiosa (2006) - A theme and variations for solo piano.
- The Alphabet of Revelation (2002) - A piano quartet.
  - The Treachery of Images
  - The Persistence of Memory
  - The Melancholy of Departure
  - Dance
- Hearts on Pilgrimage (2002) - A set of six wordless prayers for strings, oboe, clarinet, bassoon, French horn and harp.
  - Adoration I: Thanksgiving
  - Adoration II: The Mystery
  - Confession I: Longing for Home
  - Confession II: The Burden
  - Invocation I: Conversation
  - Invocation II: Practicing the Presence
- Waltzing with Shadows (2000) - A duo for cello and piano.
- Easy to Digest (2000) - A work for bari sax, bass clarinet, bassoon and tenor voice from the score for subVersions, a site-specific modern dance work.
- The Dance of Forgetting (2000) - A work for English horn, violin, cello and jazz trio (piano, bass, drums) with two readers (optional) from the score for subVersions, a site-specific modern dance work.
- The Conscience of the King (1995) - A work for classical guitar adapted from the score for Walt Disney Pictures’ A Kid in King Arthur's Court.
- In Dulci Jubilo (1994) - A suite of five traditional Christmas carols for brass quintet.
  - In Dulci Jubilo
  - The Wexford Carol
  - Joseph Dearest, Joseph Mine
  - I Wonder As I Wander
  - Susanni
- The Ancient of Days (1993) - A dramatic music narrative for brass quintet, organ, percussion and a speaker.
- Water Walker (1993) - A trio for flute, viola and harp.
- The Growing Season (1987) - Version for string quartet.
- Diminutiae (1986) - A set of four unaccompanied inventions for two violins.
- Inside Passage (1984) - A work for solo trombone, trombone choir, and percussion (optional).
- Five Songs for Flute and French Horn (1982) - An unaccompanied duo.
- Dream Dances (1982) - A duo for violin and harp.
- Valse Triste (1980) - An unaccompanied duo for cellos. There is also a version for viola and cello.

== Choral music ==
- Fire Sonnets (2021) - An a cappella cycle for mixed chorus of sonnets by Robert Wagner.
  - As cleansing soap, refining fire
  - I saw the Seraphim one summer's night
  - Who hears the ocean roaring in a tree
  - There is a fear men flee not from but to
  - A touch of incommunicable pain
  - The voice that spoke before the sun was born
- Prayer: A Kind of Tune (2020) - A setting for mixed chorus and chamber orchestra of poem by Malcolm Guite, after Prayer by George Herbert.
- Ave Verum Corpus (2018) - A sacred a cappella anthem for mixed choir on the traditional liturgical text.
- The Destruction of Sennacherib (2018) - A setting of Lord Byron’s poem for mixed chorus with violin, cello, piano and percussion.
- Love Bade Me Welcome (2017) - An a cappella setting for mixed chorus of a poem by George Herbert.
- The Singing Bowl (2017) - An a cappella setting for mixed chorus of a poem by Malcolm Guite.
- Homing (2016) - A four-movement work for mixed chorus and orchestra to texts by J. A. C. Redford.
  - I dreamed last night that I fell fast asleep
  - Oh, be swift, my soul, to answer Him! be jubilant my feet
  - I weep for a world
  - This is the house of your long-exiled soul
- Pied Beauty (2016) - An a cappella setting for mixed chorus of a poem by Gerard Manley Hopkins.
- Batter My Heart (2015) - A setting of one of John Donne’s Holy Sonnets for mixed chorus with piano accompaniment.
- Glossolalia (2015) - An a cappella setting for mixed chorus of an original text by J. A. C. Redford.
- Noël, Noël (2015) - A Christmas carol for mixed chorus and strings with words and music by Keith & Kristyn Getty and J. A. C. Redford.
- She's Like the Swallow (2015) - A setting for mixed chorus and string quartet of an anonymous traditional text.
- He That Will Learn to Pray, Let Him Go to Sea (2014) - A single-movement work for mixed chorus and organ, set to texts suggested by Dorothy Lincoln-Smith and adapted by J. A. C. Redford
- Love's Choice (2014) - An a cappella setting for mixed chorus of a poem by Malcolm Guite.
- Now and Ever, Ever So (2014) - An a cappella setting for mixed chorus of a poem by Scott Cairns.
- Antiphons (2013) - An a cappella cycle for mixed chorus of sonnets by Malcolm Guite.
  - O Sapientia
  - O Adonai
  - O Radix
  - O Clavis
  - O Oriens
  - O Rex Gentium
  - O Emmanuel
- Heaven-Haven (2013) - An a cappella setting for mixed chorus of a poem by Gerard Manley Hopkins.
- Let Beauty Be Our Memorial (2013) - An a cappella setting for mixed chorus of a poem by J. A. C. Redford.
- Sound Becoming Song (2013) - An a cappella setting for mixed chorus of Ode to St. Cecilia by Malcolm Guite.
- Treasures in Heaven (2013) - An a cappella anthem for mixed chorus.
- B Is For Bethlehem (2012) - A setting of Isabel Wilner’s Christmas alphabet for children in versions for SSA or SATB choruses with piano accompaniment.
- Musica Dei Donum Optimi (2012) - An a cappella fanfare for mixed chorus of the traditional Latin text.
- The Gift (2012) - An a cappella reverie for mixed chorus of Musica Dei Donum Optimi, combining Latin and English texts.
- Rest Now, My Sister (2011) - An elegy for mixed chorus and orchestra.
- Alleluia Amen (2011) - An a cappella anthem for mixed chorus with soprano solo.
- O Sapientia (2011) - An a cappella setting for mixed chorus of a sonnet by Malcolm Guite.
- I Saw the Cherubim (2011) - An a cappella setting for mixed chorus of two sonnets by Robert Wagner. There is also a version with orchestral accompaniment.
- Morning Canticles (2011) - Canticles from the Book of Common Prayer for mixed chorus and orchestra.
- Wake Up, My Spirit (2009) - A setting of Psalm 57 for mixed chorus with oboe and harp.
- What the Bird Said Early in the Year (2008) - An a cappella setting for mixed chorus of a poem by C. S. Lewis.
- In the Beauty of Holiness (2008) - A setting of combined passages from Psalms and 1 Chronicles for mixed chorus and orchestra.
- Glory (2008) - A Christmas anthem for mixed chorus and orchestra adapted from the second chapter of Luke.
- Time and a Summer's Day (2006) - An a cappella setting for mixed chorus of two sonnets by William Shakespeare.
- Of Mercy and Judgment (2005) - An anthem for choir with piano accompaniment.
- Evening Wind (2005) - An a cappella setting for mixed chorus of a poem by Marjorie W. Avery.
- Night Pieces (2004) - A setting of three Wordsworth nocturnes for mixed chorus and five instruments.
- The Martyrdom of St. Polycarp (2004) - An oratorio for mixed chorus, soloists and orchestra to a libretto by Scott Cairns.
- Down to the River to Pray (2003) - An a cappella arrangement by Elizabeth Ladizinsky and J. A. C. Redford of the traditional song made popular by the film, O Brother, Where Art Thou?
- Napili Bay, 2PM (2002) - An a cappella setting for mixed chorus of a poem by the composer.
- love is the every only god (2001) - A song cycle for mixed chorus with piano accompaniment to poems by E. E. Cummings
  - love is the every only god
  - what time is it?it is by every star
  - lady will you come with me into
  - white guardians of the universe of sleep
  - now that, more nearest even than your fate
  - silently if, out of not knowable
- Great is the Lord (2001) - A setting of Psalm 145 from A Psalm Triptych for women's voices (SASA) with piano accompaniment.
- A Psalm Triptych (2001) - Psalm settings for mixed chorus with piano accompaniment.
  - Psalm 98: Shout for Joy to the Lord (1987)
  - Psalm 51: Have Mercy on Me, O God (2001)
  - Psalm 145: Great is the Lord (2001)
- Wine Thou Blessing (1999) - An a cappella diversion for mixed chorus.
- Love Never Fails (1998) - A setting of 1 Corinthians 13 for mixed chorus with piano and cello accompaniment. There is also a version for women's voices (SA).
- A Connoisseur's Confession (1998) - An a cappella diversion for mixed jazz chorus including vocal percussion.
- At Cana's Feast (1998) - An anthem for women's voices (SSA) with piano accompaniment.
- Shepherd Story (1995) - A Christmas narrative for mixed chorus and orchestra adapted from the second chapter of Luke.
- Welcome All Wonders: A Christmas Celebration (1993) - A Christmas cantata for mixed chorus and orchestra.
  - Welcome All Wonders (Richard Crashaw)
  - Christmas Mourning (Vassar Miller)
  - The Nativity of Christ (Robert Southwell)
  - Good Is the Flesh (Brian Wren)
  - Christmas Now (Brian Wren)
- A Paschal Feast (1988) - An Easter choral symphony for soprano, tenor and baritone soloists, mixed chorus and orchestra.
  - New Readings (Gerard Manley Hopkins)
  - Still Falls the Rain (Dame Edith Sitwell)
  - A Better Resurrection (Christina Rossetti)
  - He hath abolished the old drouth (Gerard Manley Hopkins)

== Vocal solos ==
- Come to the Waters (2020) - A setting for solo voice of an original text by J. A. C. Redford, after Isaiah 55:1-3, 10-12.
- B Is For Bethlehem (2012) - A setting of Isabel Wilner’s Christmas alphabet for children in versions for solo voices with piano accompaniment.
- Confessiones (2010) - A song cycle for mezzo-soprano with piano accompaniment to texts from St. Augustine's Confessions.
  - O Domine, percussisti cor meum verbo tuo (O Lord, thou didst strike my heart with thy word)
  - Ego sum qui sum (I am that I am)
  - O Pulchritudo (O Beauty)
  - Deus creator omnium (God, Creator of all)
  - O Domine, quia fecisit nos ad te (O Lord, thou hast made us for thyself)
- Easy to Digest (2000) - A work for bari sax, bass clarinet, bassoon and tenor voice from the score for subVersions, a site-specific modern dance work.
- A Psalm Triptych (2001) - Psalm settings for soprano with piano accompaniment.
  - Psalm 98: Shout for Joy to the Lord (1987)
  - Psalm 51: Have Mercy on Me, O God (2001)
  - Psalm 145: Great is the Lord (2001)
- Love Never Fails (1998) - A setting of 1 Corinthians 13 for soprano with piano and cello accompaniment.
- Five Sonnets (1976) - A song cycle for soprano with piano accompaniment to poems by E. E. Cummings.
  - i thank You God
  - when serpents bargain for the right to squirm
  - so many selves
  - all ignorance toboggans into know
  - your homecoming will be my homecoming

== Music for Dance and Musical Theater ==
- subVersions (2000) - The score for a site-specific modern dance work.
  - The Story the Skin Tells
  - Don't Hold Your Breath
  - Easy to Digest
  - The Dance of Forgetting
  - Last Train
- Clementina's Cactus (1983) - A ballet for children based on the book by Ezra Jack Keats.
- The Dance (1983) - An original musical with book and lyrics by Carol Lynn Pearson.
- I Believe in Make Believe (1977) - A musical play based on Grimms' Fairy Tales with book and lyrics by Carol Lynn Pearson.
- Don’t Count Your Chickens Until They Cry Wolf (1976) - A musical play based on Aesop’s Fables with book and lyrics by Carol Lynn Pearson.

== Film and television composition ==
- BURN-E (2008, video short)
- One Night with the King (2006)
- Leroy & Stitch (2006, video, themes by Alan Silvestri)
- George of the Jungle 2 (2003, video)
- The Color of Love (2000, TV movie)
- The Promise (1999, TV movie)
- The Joyriders (1999)
- My Last Love (1999, TV movie)
- Grace and Glorie (1998, TV movie)
- Mama Flora's Family (1998, TV movie)
- Chance of a Lifetime (1998, TV movie)
- What the Deaf Man Heard (1997, TV movie)
- Two Voices (1997, TV movie)
- D3: The Mighty Ducks (1996)
- Adventures from the Book of Virtues (1996, TV Series, Season 1)
- For the Future: The Irvine Fertility Scandal (1996, TV movie)
- A Kid in King Arthur's Court (1995)
- Naomi and Wynonna: Love Can Build a Bridge (1995, TV movie)
- Heavyweights (1995) - Music Composer
- Bye Bye Love (1995)
- D2: The Mighty Ducks (1994)
- Is There Life Out There? (1994)
- Newsies (1992, Original Underscore)
- Coach (1989-1994, TV series)
- And Then There Was One (1994, TV movie)
- One More Mountain (1994, TV movie)
- The Road Home (1994, TV series, score and theme music composer)
- For Their Own Good (1993, TV movie)
- Kiss of a Killer (1993, TV movie)
- Delta (1992, TV series)
- Home Fires (1992, TV series)
- Capitol Critters (1992, TV series)
- Locked Up: A Mother's Rage (1991, TV movie)
- "Princesses" (1991, TV series)
- Coconut Downs (1991, TV movie)
- Conagher (1991, TV movie)
- The Astronomers (1991, TV series documentary)
- Stop at Nothing (1991, TV movie)
- Web of Deceit (1990 TV movie)
- Capital News (1990, TV series)
- A Son's Promise (1990, TV movie)
- Breaking Point (1989, TV movie)
- Dad's a Dog (1989, TV movie)
- Oliver & Company (1988, Original Underscore and Song Producer: Good Company)
- Annie McGuire (1988-1989, TV series)
- St. Elsewhere (1982-1988, TV series)
- Save the Dog! (1988, TV movie)
- Coming of Age (1988-1989, TV series)
- The Long Journey Home (1987, TV movie)
- Stamp of a Killer (1987, TV movie)
- Independence (1987, TV movie)
- Easy Prey (1986, TV movie)
- Extremities (1986)
- Alex the Life of a Child (1986, TV movie)
- The Trip to Bountiful (1985, Music and Song Arranger: "Softly and Tenderly" (hymn)
- Cry from the Mountain (1985)
- The Twilight Zone (1986, TV Series)
- Going for the Gold: The Bill Johnson Story (1985, TV movie)
- The Key to Rebecca (1985, TV movie)
- The Best Times (1985, TV series)
- Cover Up (1984, TV series)
- Hawaiian Heat (1984, TV series)
- Helen Keller: The Miracle Continues (1984, TV movie)
- Automan (1984, TV series)
- Whiz Kids (1984, TV series)
- Cutter to Houston (1983, TV series)
- Happy Endings (1983, TV movie)
- Voyagers! (1983, TV series)
- Trauma Center (1983, TV series)
- Honeyboy (1982, TV movie)
- Tucker's Witch (1982, TV series)
- The Long Summer of George Adams (1982, TV movie)
- King's Crossing (1982, TV series)
- Fame (1981, TV series)
- American Dream (1981, TV series)
- Bret Maverick (1981-1982, TV series)
- 240-Robert (1979, TV series)
- Starsky & Hutch (1979, TV series, co-composer)
- The Dooley Brothers (1979, TV movie)
- Stingray (1978)
- James at 15 (1977-1978, TV series, co-composer)
- Christmas Snows, Christmas Winds (1978, short)

== Orchestration and conducting ==
- Elemental (2023, Supervising Orchestrator)
- White Bird: A Wonder Story (2023, Orchestrator)
- Avatar: The Way of Water (2022, Orchestrator)
- Dog (2022, Orchestrator)
- Operation Mincemeat (2021, Orchestrator)
- The Highwaymen (2019, Orchestrator)
- Thank You for Your Service (2017, Orchestrator)
- Victoria & Abdul (2017, Orchestrator)
- Passengers (2016, Orchestrator)
- The Magnificent Seven (2016, Orchestrator)
- Finding Dory (2016, Orchestrator)
- Spectre (2015, Orchestrator)
- Bridge of Spies (2015, Orchestrator)
- He Named Me Malala (2015, Orchestrator)
- The Second Best Exotic Marigold Hotel (2015, Orchestrator)
- Wolf Totem (2015, Orchestrator)
- The Judge (2014, Orchestrator)
- Get on Up (2014, Orchestrator)
- Saving Mr. Banks (2013, Orchestrator)
- Romeo and Juliet (2013, Orchestrator)
- Monsters University (2013, Orchestrator)
- Skyfall (2012, Orchestrator)
- The Amazing Spider-Man (2012, Orchestrator)
- For Greater Glory: The True Story of Cristiada (2012, Orchestrator)
- The Iron Lady (2011, Orchestrator)
- The Best Exotic Marigold Hotel (2011, Orchestrator)
- Black Gold (2011, Orchestrator)
- The Help (2011, Orchestrator)
- Phineas and Ferb the Movie: Across the 2nd Dimension (2011, Orchestrator and Conductor)
- The Adjustment Bureau (2011, Orchestrator)
- The Debt (2011, Orchestrator)
- The Karate Kid (2010, Orchestrator)
- The 82nd Annual Academy Awards (2010, TV special, Music Arranger)
- Avatar (2009, Orchestrator)
- Tigger and Pooh and a Musical Too (2009, Orchestrator)
- Revolutionary Road (2008, Orchestrator)
- WALL-E (2008, Orchestrator)
- Leatherheads (2008, Orchestrator as Jac Redford)
- The Spiderwick Chronicles (2008, Orchestrator)
- Bobby Jones: Stroke of Genius (2004, Orchestrator)
- The Missing (2003, Orchestrator)
- xXx (2002, Arranger:Vocals)
- Windtalkers (2002, Orchestrator)
- Iris (2001, Orchestrator)
- Enemy at the Gates (2001, Orchestrator)
- How the Grinch Stole Christmas (2000, Orchestrator)
- The Perfect Storm (2000, Orchestrator)
- Cirque du Soleil: Journey of Man (Short film, 2000, Orchestrator and Conductor)
- Bicentennial Man (1999, Orchestrator)
- The Other Sister (1999, Conductor)
- Mighty Joe Young (1998, Orchestrator)
- Deep Impact (1998, Additional Orchestrator)
- A Pyromaniac's Love Story (1995, Conductor)
- Bye Bye Love (1995, Conductor)
- Black Beauty (1994, Conductor as Jack Redford)
- Heart and Souls (1993, Conductor as JAC Redford)
- The Joy Luck Club (1993, Conductor)
- The Nightmare Before Christmas (1993, Conductor)
- Benny & Joon (1993, Conductor)
- Billy Bathgate (1991, Conductor)
- The Little Mermaid (1989, Conductor)
- Repairs (1987, short, Music Supervisor)

== Discography ==
Concert works

- Confessiones (2017)
- Inside Passage (2017)
- The Growing Season (2016)
- Waltzing with Shadows (2016)
- Let Beauty Be Our Memorial (2015)
- The Alphabet of Revelation (2008)
- Evening Wind (2006)
- Eternity Shut in a Span (2004)
- Welcome All Wonders: A Christmas Celebration (1995)
- Philadelphia Brass Christmas (1994)
- Is This the Way to Carnegie Hall? (1988)

Feature Film

- The Trip to Bountiful (1997)
- D3: The Mighty Ducks (1996)
- A Kid in King Arthur's Court (1995)
- Bye Bye Love (1995)
- D2: The Mighty Ducks (1994)
- Newsies (1992)
- Oliver & Company (1988)

Television

- What the Deaf Man Heard (1998)
- Adventures from the Book of Virtues (1998)
- Independence (1996)
- The Key to Rebecca (1993)
- The Astronomers (1991, TV series documentary)

Other Recordings

- Steven Curtis Chapman: Speechless (1999, co-composer and conductor, "The Journey")
- Michael Card: Unveiled Hope (1997, co-composer and conductor, "Prelude" and "Reprise")
- Zephyr A Choir of Angels II: Mission Music (1997, producer)
- Michael Card: The Ancient Faith (1993, co-composer and conductor, "Ancient Faith")
- Steven Curtis Chapman: The Great Adventure (1992, Composer and conductor, Prologue: The Great Adventure)
- Michael Card: The Word: Recapturing the Imagination (1992, arranger and conductor, "The Prophet," "Then They Will Know" and "The Kingdom", arranger, "Will You Not Listen")
- Michael Card: The Promise (1991, arranger and conductor, "The Promise (Overture," "Unto Us a Son is Given," "What Her Heart Remembered," "Joseph's Song," ""Vicit Agnus Noster," "Shepherd's Watch," "Jacob's Star," "We Will Find Him," "Thou The Promise," and "Immanuel"
- Various Artists Love and Desire (1989, composer, conductor, and producer, incidental music)
- Bonnie Raitt: Nine Lives (1986, composer, "Stand Up to the Night"
- Cynthia Clawson: Immortal (1986, arranger and conductor, "Softly And Tenderly"

== Soundtrack credits ==
- Skyfall (2012, Orchestrator)
- The Amazing Spider-Man (2012, Orchestrator)
- For Greater Glory: The True Story of Cristiada (2012, Orchestrator)
- The Iron Lady (2011, Orchestrator)
- The Best Exotic Marigold Hotel (2011, Orchestrator)
- Black Gold (2011, Orchestrator)
- The Help (2011, Orchestrator)
- Phineas and Ferb the Movie: Across the 2nd Dimension (2011, Orchestrator and Conductor)
- The Adjustment Bureau (2011, Orchestrator)
- The Debt (2011, Orchestrator)
- The Karate Kid (2010, Orchestrator)
- Avatar (2009, Orchestrator)
- Tigger and Pooh and a Musical Too (2009, Orchestrator)
- Revolutionary Road (2008, Orchestrator)
- WALL-E (2008, Orchestrator)
- Leatherheads (2008, Orchestrator as Jac Redford)
- The Spiderwick Chronicles (2008, Orchestrator)
- One Night With the King (2006, Composer: original score, Songwriter: "Kingdom of Love")
- Bobby Jones: Stroke of Genius (2004, Orchestrator and Arranger: "The Blue Danube Waltz, Opus 314" as Jac Redford)
- The Missing (2003, Orchestrator)
- xXx (2002, Arranger:Vocals)
- Windtalkers (2002, Orchestrator)
- Iris (2001, Orchestrator)
- Enemy at the Gates (2001, Orchestrator)
- How the Grinch Stole Christmas (2000, Orchestrator)
- The Perfect Storm (2000, Orchestrator)
- "Cirque du Soleil: Journey of Man" (Short film, 2000, Orchestrator and Conductor)
- Bicentennial Man (1999, Orchestrator)
- The Other Sister (1999, Conductor)
- Mighty Joe Young (1998, Orchestrator)
- Deep Impact (1998, Additional Orchestrator)
- Jazz in Film (1998, Arranger and Conductor)
- Adventures from the Book of Virtues (1997, TV series, Songwriter: "Lighter Than Air")
- Adventures from the Book of Virtues (1997, TV series, Songwriter: "Twice Blessed")
- Adventures from the Book of Virtues (1997, TV series, Songwriter: "Facing the Wind")
- Adventures from the Book of Virtues (1997, TV series, Songwriter: "Don't Skip the Lines")
- Adventures from the Book of Virtues (1997, TV series, Songwriter: "The Heart Gives")
- Adventures from the Book of Virtues (1997, TV series, Songwriter: "Fearless Friends")
- Adventures from the Book of Virtues (1997, TV series, Songwriter: "One in a Thousand")
- Adventures from the Book of Virtues (1997, TV series, Songwriter (music and lyrics): "We are Never Alone")
- Adventures from the Book of Virtues (1997, TV series, Songwriter (music and lyrics): "The Truth is a Chest of Treasures")
- Adventures from the Book of Virtues (1997, TV series, Songwriter (music and lyrics): "Workin' Is Fun)
- Adventures from the Book of Virtues (1997, TV series, Songwriter (music and lyrics): "Responsibility")
- Adventures from the Book of Virtues (1997, TV series, Songwriter and performer: "A Little Respect")
- Adventures from the Book of Virtues (1997, TV series, Songwriter and performer: "Only a Hill")
- Cinderella: Walt Disney Presents the Music of Cinderella (1995, Conductor and co-producer)
- A Pyromaniac's Love Story (1995, Conductor)
- Black Beauty (1994, Conductor as Jack Redford)
- Heart and Souls (1993, Conductor as JAC Redford)
- The Joy Luck Club (1993, Conductor)
- The Nightmare Before Christmas (1993, Conductor)
- Benny & Joon (1993, Conductor)
- Repairs (1987, short, Music Supervisor)
