= Andrew Briggs =

British material scientist (born 1950)

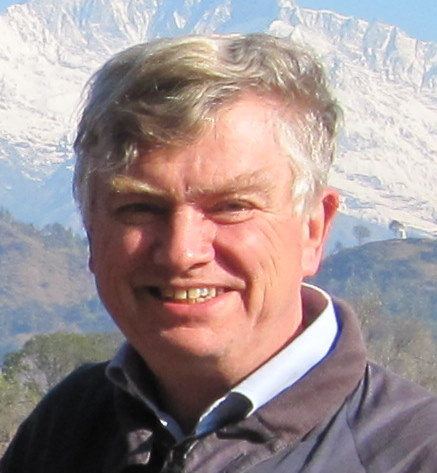
- Briggs in 2011
- Born: George Andrew Davidson Briggs; 3 June 1950 (age 76); Dorchester, Dorset, England
- Education: The Leys School
- Alma mater: University of Oxford (BA); University of Cambridge (PhD)
- Known for: Acoustic Microscopy; Quantum Nanomaterials
- Spouse: Diana née Johnson (m. 1981)
- Children: 2
- Awards: Holliday Prize; Buehler Technical Paper Merit Award for Excellence; Metrology for World Class Manufacturing Award; Honorary Fellow of the Royal Microscopical Society
- Scientific career
- Fields: Materials Science
- Workplaces: University of Oxford; University of Cambridge; Ecole polytechnique fédérale de Lausanne
- Doctoral advisor: David Tabor
- Doctoral students: Rachel Oliver; David Britz; Stephanie Simmons
- Website: www.materials.ox.ac.uk/peoplepages/briggs.html

George Andrew Davidson Briggs (born 1950) is a British scientist. He is Professor of Nanomaterials in the Department of Materials at the University of Oxford. He is best known for his early work in acoustic microscopy and his current work in materials for quantum technologies.

== Early life and education ==
He was born in Dorchester, Dorset, son of David Briggs, a classics teacher at Bryanston School Dorset, and later headmaster of King's College School Cambridge, and Mary (née Lormer), whose former maths pupils include Sir Timothy Gowers and Sir Andrew Wiles.

He was educated at the Leys School Cambridge, he studied physics at St. Catherine's College, Oxford, from 1968 to 1971 as the Clothworkers' Scholar. From 1973 to 1976 he undertook research for a PhD at the Cavendish Laboratory. From 1976 to 1979 he studied theology at Ridley Hall and Queens' College, Cambridge, where he won the Chase Prize for Greek.

== Career and research ==
From 1971 to 1973, after graduating from his first degree he taught Physics and Religious Education at Canford School, Dorset. In 1979 he was a Research Assistant in the Engineering Department at Cambridge University. In 1980 moved to Oxford as a Research Fellow in the Department of Metallurgy and from 1981 Lecturer in Physics at St Catherine's College. In 1984 he was appointed Lecturer in Metallurgy and Science of Materials at the University of Oxford, in 1996 Reader in Materials, and in 1999 Professor of Materials.

In 2002 he was elected to the newly created Chair of Nanomaterials at the University of Oxford. From 2002 to 2009 he was Director of the Quantum Information Processing Interdisciplinary Research Collaboration, and EPSRC Professorial Research Fellow.

Since 2010 he has also been responsible for the preparation and evaluation of grant proposals to Templeton World Charity Foundation which serves as a philanthropic catalyst for discoveries relating to the Big Questions of human purpose and ultimate reality. He has initiated a large number of research projects and related activities around the world, in topics such as spiritual discovery through science, science as a component of theology, the power of information, freedom and free enterprise, and character development.

He has published over 600 papers, books and articles; the majority in internationally reviewed journals. His scientific research since taking up the Chair of Nanomaterials in 2002 has concentrated on materials with potential for building quantum computers. These include molecules in which the quantum states of electron and nuclear spins can be controlled with exquisite precision. Having established the key necessary phenomena in ensembles of large numbers of spins, since 2013 he has worked on harnessing quantum properties in devices. He has also shown how the materials and techniques developed for quantum information technologies can be used for investigating the nature of reality in the context of different interpretations of quantum theory.

=== Fellowships, memberships, and overseas appointments ===
- 1984 Fellow of Wolfson College, Oxford
- 1992–2002 Professeur invité, Ecole Polytechnique Fédérale de Lausanne
- 2002 Visiting professor, the University of New South Wales
- 2003 Professorial Fellow of St Anne's College, Oxford, and Emeritus Fellow, Wolfson College, Oxford
- 2004 Fellow of the Institute of Physics
- 2005 Guest Professor, State Key Laboratory for Nanotechnology, Wuhan, China
- 2011 Member Academia Europaea
- 2013 Fellow International Society for Science and Religion.

=== Awards and honours ===
- 1986 Holliday Prize, Institute of Metals, ‘for his outstanding research and development in the field of scanning acoustic microscopy and for the application of this novel technique to the solution of materials problems.’
- 1994 Buehler Technical Paper Merit Award for Excellence. "Depth measurements of short cracks in perspex with the scanning acoustic microscope." Materials Characterization 31, 115–126 (1993), reprinted in Materials Characterization 39, 653–644 (1997).
- 1999 Metrology for World Class Manufacturing Awards: Winner (with Dr O.V. Kolosov), Category 1, Frontier Science and Measurement. “Ultrasonic Force Microscopy (UFM)”, ‘Kolosov and Briggs have demonstrated the effect on various materials and shown that UFM is capable of both high resolution and quantitative measurement.’
- 1999 Honorary Fellow of the Royal Microscopical Society. ‘This award is in recognition of your many outstanding achievements in various scanned probe microscopy techniques and their applications to the study of the mechanical and structural properties of surfaces over a very wide dimensional scale. Your recent development of the ultrasonic force microscope is an example of your innovative achievements.’
- 2007 Oxfordshire Science Writing Competition: 2nd Prize for article ‘Molecules are Real.’

=== Other activities ===
Peer Review College of the Engineering and Physical Sciences Research Council; Science and Engineering Fellowships Committee of The Royal Commission for the Exhibition of 1851; Engineering Review Panel of the Newton International Fellowships; Board of Management of the Ian Ramsey Centre; Advisory Board of the McDonald Centre; Board of Electors to the Wilde Lectureship in Natural and Comparative Religion; Liveryman of the Worshipful Company of Clothworkers and Freeman of the City of London; Editorial Board of Science & Christian Belief; International Board of Advisors of the John Templeton Foundation.

=== Publications ===
- An Introduction to Scanning Acoustic Microscopy. Royal Microscopical Society Handbook 12, Oxford University Press (1985). Andrew Briggs.
- Acoustic Microscopy. Oxford: Clarendon Press (1992). Andrew Briggs
- The Science of New Materials. Oxford: Blackwell (1992). Ed Andrew Briggs
- Advances in Acoustic Microscopy 1. New York: Plenum Press (1995). Ed Andrew Briggs
- Advances in Acoustic Microscopy 2. New York: Plenum Press (1996). Eds Andrew Briggs and Walter Arnold
- Acoustic Microscopy, 2nd Edition. Oxford: Clarendon Press (2010). G.A.D. Briggs and O.V. Kolosov
- The Penultimate Curiosity: How science swims in the slipstream of ultimate questions. Roger Wagner and Andrew Briggs, Oxford University Press (2016)
- It Keeps Me Seeking: The Invitation from Science, Philosophy and Religion. Andrew Briggs, Hans Halvorson, and Andrew Steane, Oxford University Press (2018)
- Human Flourishing: Scientific Insight and Spiritual Wisdom in Uncertain Times. Andrew Briggs and Michael J. Reiss, Oxford University Press (2021)

== Personal life ==
Andrew Briggs is a practising Christian. As a teenager, he was an officer on the Iwerne Christian camps, then run by John Smyth.

Briggs is a resident of Northmoor Road, Oxford, and for several years the artist Roger Wagner and Briggs lived in the same house, which ultimately led to them co-authoring a book, The Penultimate Curiosity: How science swims in the slipstream of ultimate questions.
