= St Mary the Virgin, Iffley =

Coordinates: 51.7274°N 1.2382°W

- Church of St Mary the Virgin
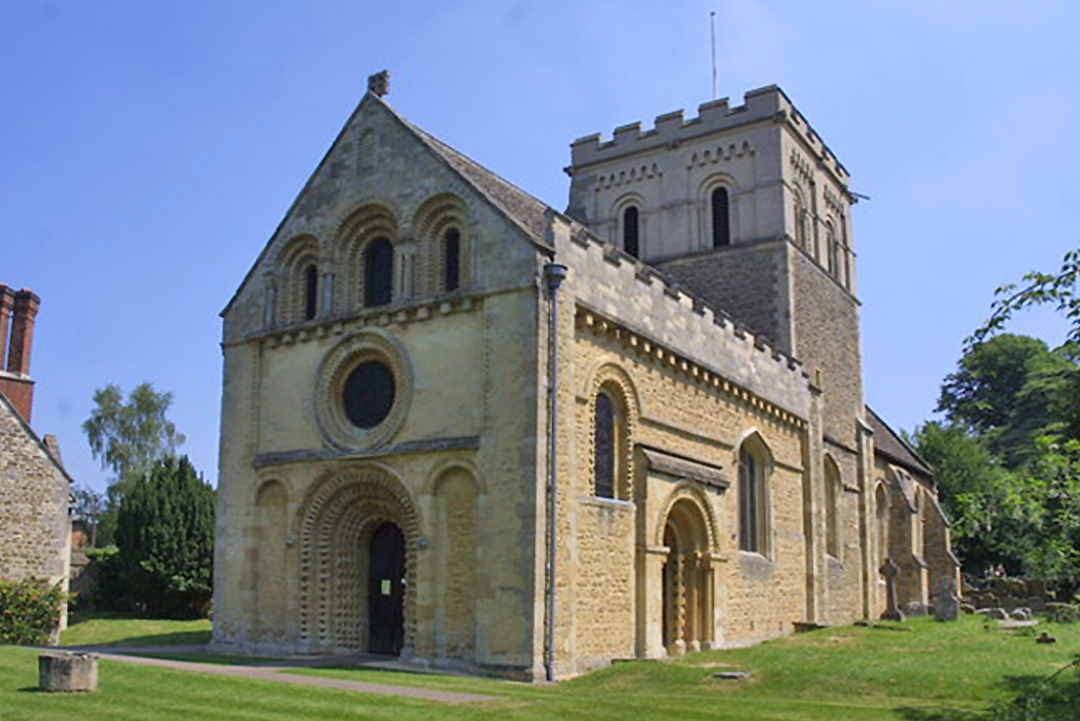
- St Mary the Virgin, Iffley
- OS grid reference: SP 52714 03456
- Location: Iffley, Oxfordshire
- Country: England
- Denomination: Church of England
- Churchmanship: Broad Church
- Website: iffleychurch.org.uk

History
- Status: Active
- Dedication: Saint Mary

Architecture
- Functional status: Parish Church
- Heritage designation: Grade I listed
- Style: Romanesque
- Years built: c.1160–1230; 796 years ago

Administration
- Province: Province of Canterbury
- Diocese: Diocese of Oxford
- Archdeaconry: Archdeaconry of Oxford
- Deanery: Cowley

Clergy
- Vicar: The Revd Clare Hayns

The Church of St Mary the Virgin, Iffley is a Church of England parish church in the village of Iffley, Oxfordshire, England, now absorbed as a suburb of the city of Oxford.It is Grade I listed.

== History ==
The Romanesque church was built c.1160 by the St Remy family, probably financed with funds from the de Clintons of Kenilworth Castle. The Early Gothic east end was extended in c.1230, when a cell was constructed on the south side for the anchoress Annora.

The building has not been changed much over the centuries, retaining its round-arched windows and doorways, as well as its original plan. In the seventeeth century the nave roof was lowered, altering the windows on the west end by cutting into the gable. This was most likely done at the same time as the crenellated parapet was added to the south side of the nave; there is a date on the parapet of 1612. The gable and subsequently the nave roof were raised to their original height and pitch in 1823 and 1844 respectively, with the windows restored. The rose window was added between 1856 and 1860. Both the west and south doorway feature elaborate carvings, with the south doorway protected by a porch until the nineteeth century. This stonework is now protected by a limestone spray.

In the south wall of the nave is as a stained glass window designed by John Piper and made by glassmaker David Wasley in 1982 for an exhibition in Bristol. It was only installed at Iffley in 1995 after being gifted to the church by Piper's widow, Myfanwy. The window depicting Piper’s familiar Tree of Life motif, which here uniquely reworks the message of the Birth of Christ. Five animals are portrayed on the branches of the tree and in front, proclaiming in Latin: Cock – Christus natus est (Christ is born); Goose – Quando? Quando? (When? When?); Crow – In hac nocte (On this night); Owl – Ubi? Ubi? (Where? where?); Lamb – Bethlehem! Bethlehem! In the bottom panel is the quote "Let man and beast appear before Him and magnify His name together…."

Opposite is a window depicting the Flowering Tree designed by Roger Wagner and realised in glass by Patrick Costeloe of Thomas Denny’s studio in 2012.

== Gallery ==
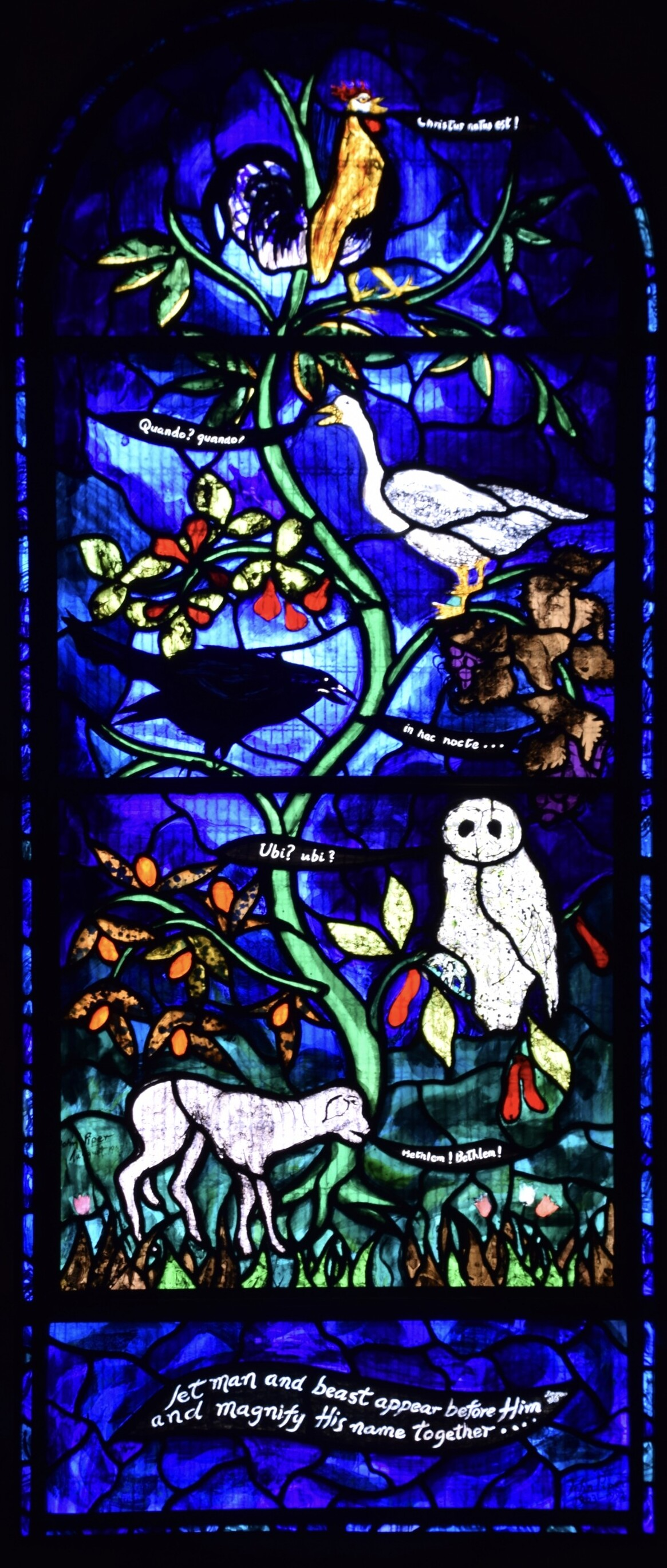
Stained glass window by John Piper

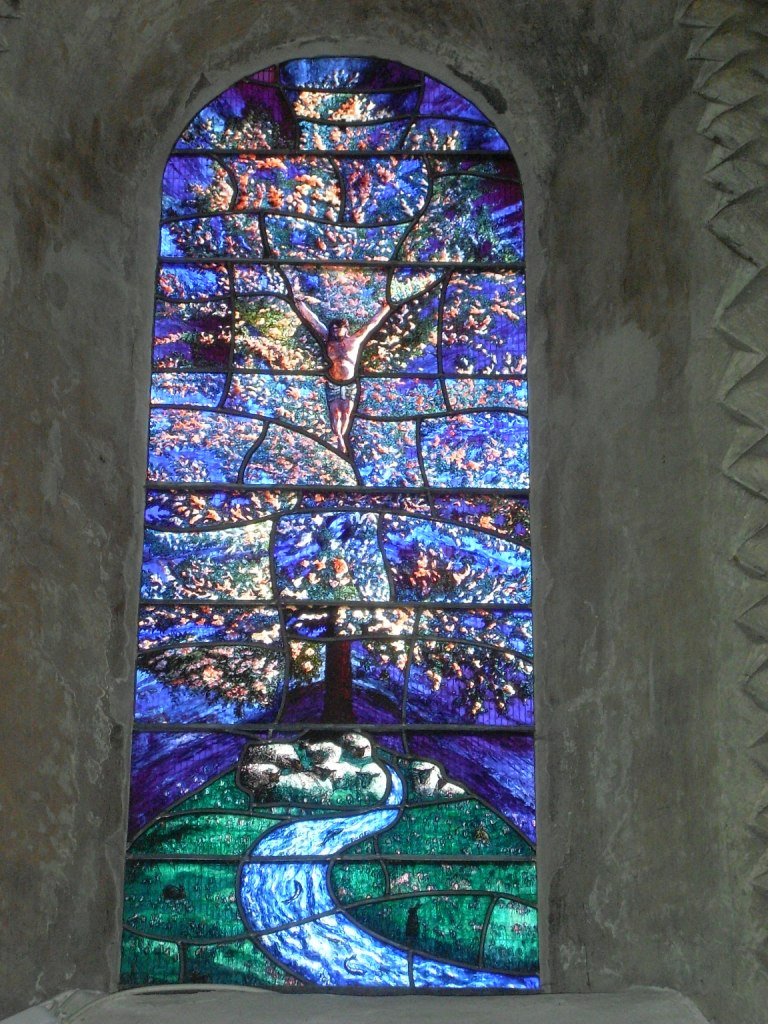
Stained glass window by Roger Wagner

== See also ==
- List of churches in Oxford
