= Reason (poem) =

Short poem by C. S. Lewis

"Reason" is a short poem of sixteen lines by C. S. Lewis, written in about 1925.

== Text ==
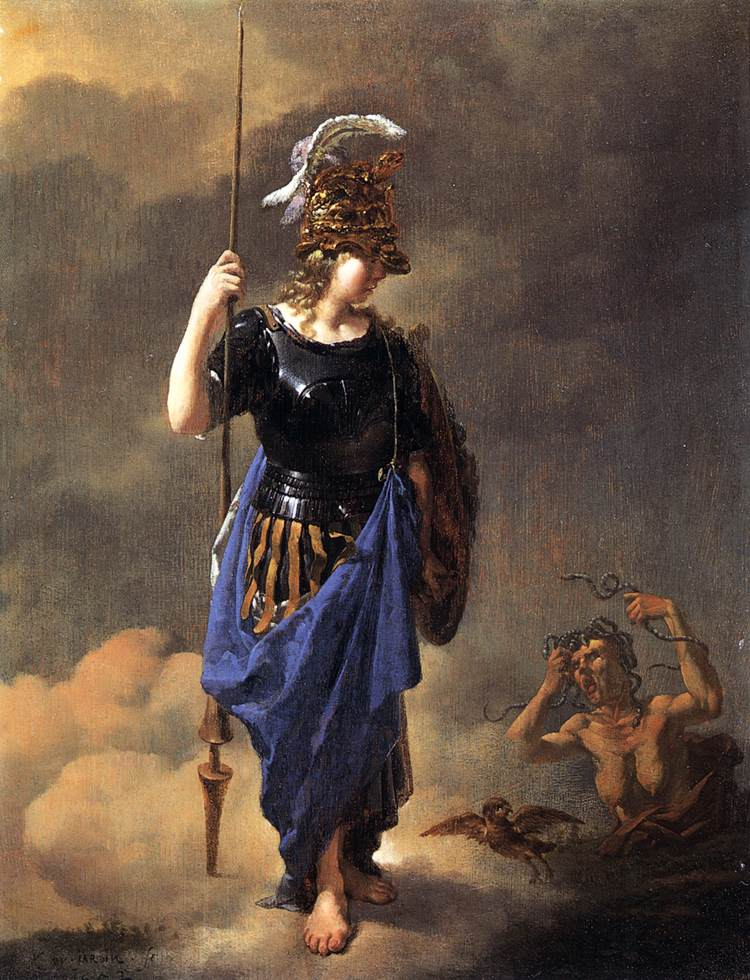
Minerva (Athena)
"A virgin arm'd"

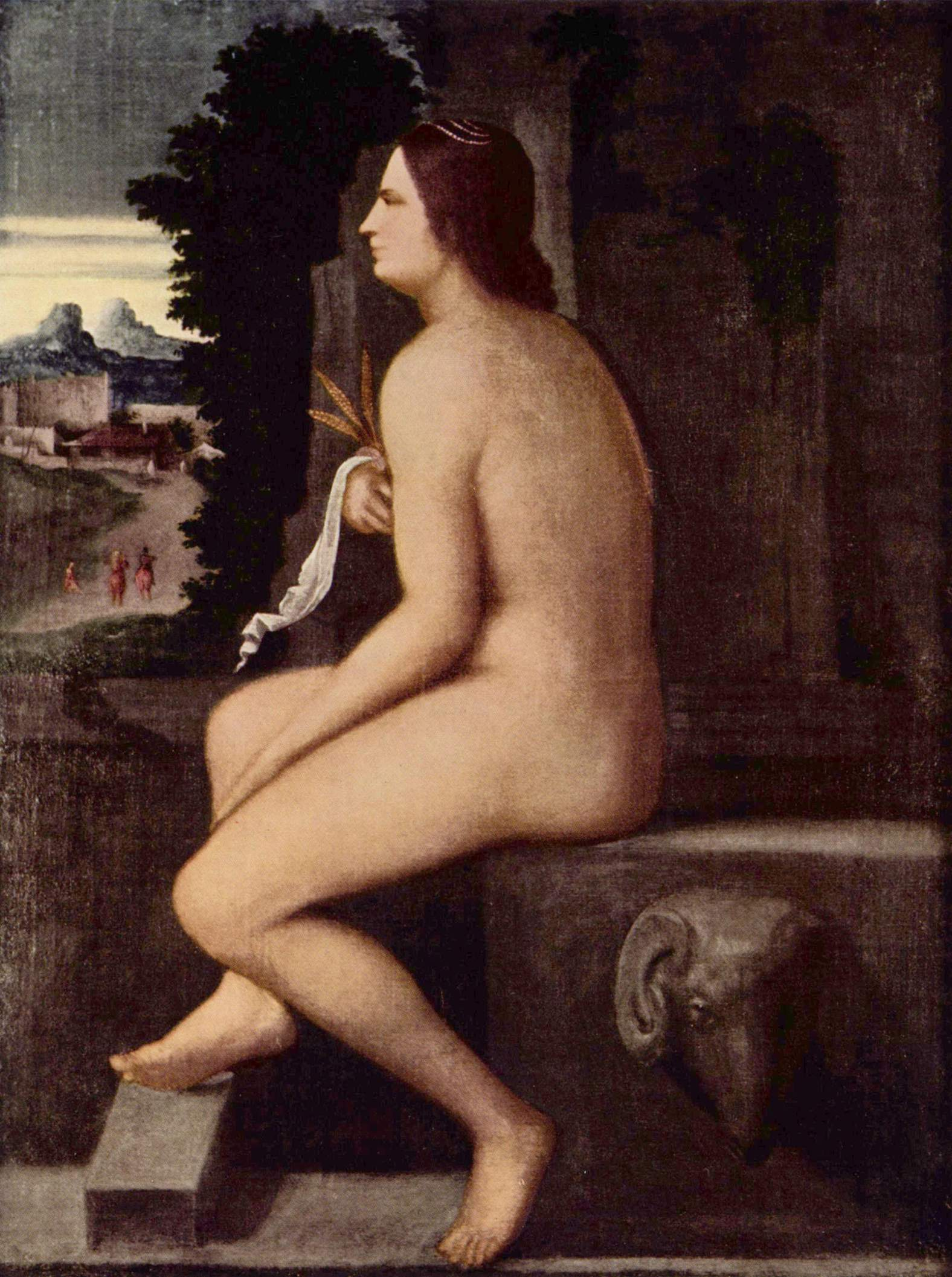
Ceres (Demeter)
"Daughter of Night"

Set on the soul's acropolis the reason stands
A virgin, arm'd, commercing with celestial light,
And he who sins against her has defiled his own
Virginity: no cleansing makes his garment white;
So clear is reason. But how dark, imagining,
Warm, dark, obscure and infinite, daughter of Night:
Dark is her brow, the beauty of her eyes with sleep
Is loaded, and her pains are long, and her delight.
Tempt not Athene. Wound not in her fertile pains
Demeter, nor rebel against her mother-right.
Oh who will reconcile in me both maid and mother,
Who make in me a concord of the depth and height?
Who make imagination's dim exploring touch
Ever report the same as intellectual sight?
Then could I truly say and not deceive,
Then wholly say that I BELIEVE.

== Background ==
The poem, initially untitled in manuscript form, was only published posthumously in Walter Hooper's critical edition The Collected Poems of C.S. Lewis, and is entitled therein "Reason". It has been suggested that a more correct title would be "Reason and Imagination". Hooper dates the poem to as early as 1925—after Lewis embraced theism, but before his conversion to Christianity in 1931.

== Analysis ==
According to Malcolm Guite, "The poem offers an extended metaphor of the soul as an inner Athens divided between the two Goddesses, Athene, who represents Reason, and Demeter, who represents the Imagination." The speaker wishes to reconcile the two forces within himself, and in the sestet poses an unanswered question: "Oh who will reconcile in me both maid and mother, …?" Guite finds allusion to the Annunciation in these lines, and sees in the spatial language of the poem the following passage from Ephesians:

That Christ may dwell in your hearts by faith; that ye, being rooted and grounded in love,
May be able to comprehend with all saints what is the breadth, and length, and depth, and height;
And to know the love of Christ, which passeth knowledge, that ye might be filled with all the fulness of God.

== Sources ==
- Guite, Malcolm (2010). "Poet". In MacSwain, Robert, & Ward, Michael (eds.). The Cambridge Companion to C. S. Lewis. United Kingdom: Cambridge University Press. pp. 294–308
- Guite, Malcolm (2016). "Telling the Truth through Imaginative Fiction: C. S. Lewis on the Reconciliation of Athene and Demeter". In Ward, Michael, & Williams, Peter S. (eds.). C. S. Lewis at Poets' Corner. Eugene, OR: Cascade Books. pp. 15–24.
- King, Don W. (2001). C. S. Lewis, Poet: The Legacy of His Poetic Impulse. Kent, Ohio & London: The Kent State University Press. pp. 196–197.
- Lindskoog, Kathryn (15 December 1979). "Getting It Together: Lewis and the Two Hemispheres of Knowing". Mythlore, 6(1/13): pp. 43–45.
