= Clarendon Fund =

University of Oxford scholarship

Logo of the Clarendon Fund

The Clarendon Fund Scholarship is a scholarship at the University of Oxford. All Oxford University applicants to degree-bearing graduate courses are automatically considered for the scholarship.

Established in 2000 and launched in 2001, now the scheme annually creates over 200 Clarendon Fund Scholarships, formerly referred to as Clarendon Fund Bursaries, to Oxford graduate students from around the world and from across all subject areas who demonstrate academic excellence and potential. The 2022-23 cohort of Clarendon Scholars includes students from 42 countries.

The Clarendon Scholarship enables the most distinguished and competitive scholars to undertake part- or full-time degree-bearing graduate study, including taught master's degrees, research master's, and research doctorates at the university. Unlike the similar Rhodes Scholarship, it is open to all applicants regardless of age. It covers course fees and provides a grant for living expenses.

As of 2022, there have been more than 2,000 recipients of scholarships from the Clarendon Fund, including over 400 Clarendon Scholars at Oxford in the academic year of 2022/23.

== History ==
Financed primarily by the Oxford University Press, the Clarendon Fund was established by the Council of the University of Oxford in 2000 and launched in 2001. The original aim of the Fund, as agreed by the council, was to "assist the best overseas graduate students who obtain places to study in the University", regardless of financial capability and to remove any barriers between the best prospective graduate students and studying at the University of Oxford. However, in the year of the Clarendon Fund's 10th anniversary, from 1 September 2011, the ambit of the Fund and its scholarships was expanded to include all nationalities and all fee statuses, as opposed to only candidates with overseas fee status.

The Clarendon Fund is sponsored by Oxford University Press, from which it has received more than £37 million. It covers fees and living expenses. The scholarship community, called the Clarendon Scholars' Association, is also funded so that it can provide scholars with opportunities ranging from career-oriented to cultural and social events, to foster long-lasting friendships between the scholars.

== Selection ==
Every applicant to a degree-bearing graduate course at the University of Oxford is automatically considered for a Clarendon Fund Scholarship. Unlike many scholarships that highlight the need for a track record of leadership among their applicants, the Clarendon Fund Scholarship focuses primarily on proven academic performance and potential for advancing their fields of study during and beyond their time in Oxford. The process of selection aims to award the scholarship to students from each of the university's four academic divisions and the Department of Continuing Education, allowing interdisciplinary interaction amongst the scholars.

== Symbols ==
=== Name ===
Edward Hyde, later Earl of Clarendon and also Chancellor of the University of Oxford from 1660 to 1667, wrote a famous and highly profitable work, History of the Great Rebellion about the English Civil War of the 17th century. The profits of his book were used to construct the university-owned Clarendon Building on Broad Street in central Oxford. The Clarendon Building was designed to house Oxford University Press (OUP), and so the Clarendon Fund was named in honour of this famous building and its historic linkages to OUP, the main benefactor of the Clarendon Scholarships.

=== Logo ===
The Clarendon Fund logo was designed in 2009 in the run-up to the Fund's 10th anniversary, and simplified and updated in 2014. It celebrates both the long history and traditions of Oxford and of OUP, as well as welcoming the Clarendon scholars who will write the pages of the university's future.

It shows the statues of the Muses at the top of the Clarendon building, which are perhaps the building's most recognisable feature and an iconic part of the Oxford skyline. The building was constructed in the classical style from 1711 to 1713 on the design of Nicholas Hawksmoor, a pupil of the famous architect Sir Christopher Wren.

The font used with the logo is called Trajan Pro and has its origins in the Roman lettering found on Trajan's Column, which was completed in 113 CE. It was chosen specifically to complement the architectural style of the Clarendon building. Trajan remains one of the most widely used fonts in book jacket cover design, a further link to the Clarendon Building's original use as the home of OUP.

== Clarendon Scholars’ Council ==
The Clarendon Scholars’ Council helps strengthen social and intellectual exchange among scholars by organising events and activities. The Council consists of several members elected from among the scholar community. Another responsibility of the Council is to promote the reputation and visibility of the Clarendon Scholarship and the University of Oxford through a strong alumni network and collaborations with other institutions.

The Clarendon Scholars’ Council is elected annually by the Clarendon Scholars. The 2024–2025 Scholars’ Councilwas composed as follows:

Function	Name	Country	Field of Study
President	Daniel Hawkins Iddrisu	Ghana	Education
Vice-President	Yizhen Wang	China	Atomic and Laser Physics
Treasurer	Mirudula Elanchezhian	India	Biology
Communications Secretary	Elif Bayat	Germany	Global Governance and Diplomacy
Outreach Secretary	Anouar El Moumane	Germany	Chemistry
Academic Secretary	Katharina Lasinger	Austria	Condensed Matter Physics
Social Secretary	Sydney Tucker	United States	Social Intervention and Policy Evaluation
Social Secretary	Liying Jin	China	Molecular and Cellular Medicine
Cultural Secretary	Xiangying Ye	China	Earth Sciences
Diversity Secretary	Nithya Srinivasan	India	Public Policy

== Notable alumni ==
- Stephanie Simmons (Quantum computing researcher at Simon Fraser University)
- Julian Brave Noisecat (Indigenous climate activist and writer)
- Li Shengwu (Economist)
