= Iffley =

Village in Oxfordshire, England

Coordinates: 51.731°N 1.227°W

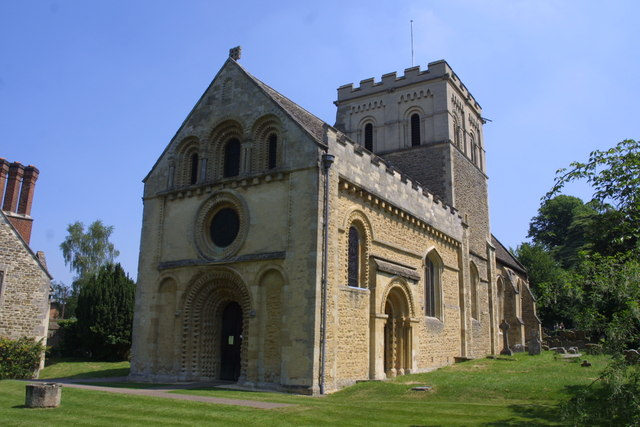
- St Mary's parish church

- Location within Oxfordshire
- OS grid reference: SP535037
- District: Oxford
- Shire county: Oxfordshire
- Region: South East
- Country: England
- Sovereign state: United Kingdom
- Post town: Oxford
- Postcode district: OX4
- Dialling code: 01865
- Police: Thames Valley
- Fire: Oxfordshire
- Ambulance: South Central
- UK Parliament: Oxford East

Iffley is a village in a designated conservation area in Oxfordshire, England. It lies within the boundaries of the city of Oxford, between Cowley and the estates of Rose Hill and Donnington, and in proximity to the River Thames (Isis). A notable feature is its largely unchanged Norman church, St Mary the Virgin, which has a modern stained glass Nativity window designed by John Piper and another window designed by Roger Wagner. The church is a Grade I listed building.

== History ==
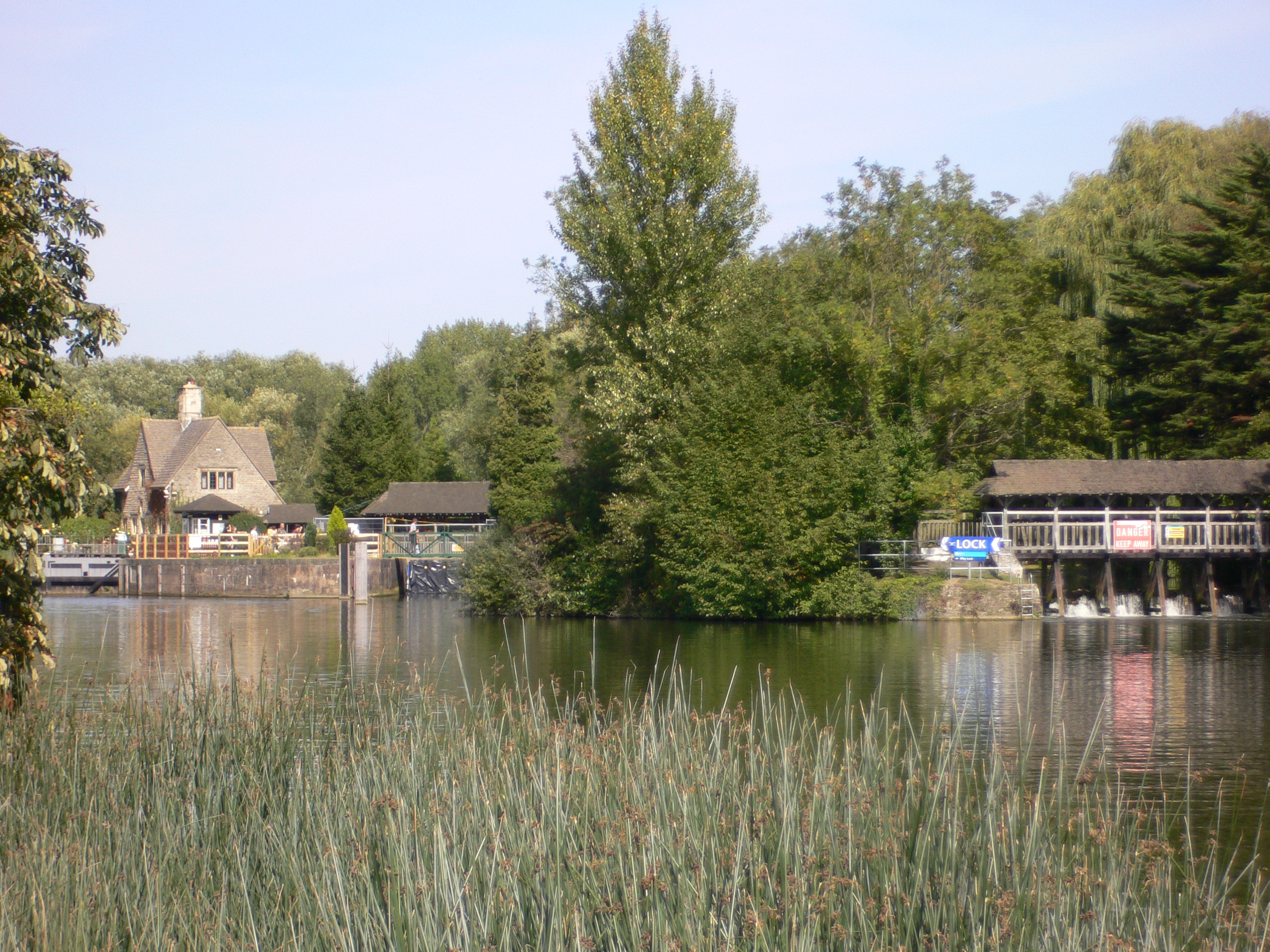
The lock at Iffley village

"In the chronicles of Abingdon Abbey (941 – 946) the place is called Gifteleia. The Domesday Book of 1086 it is Givetelei. Merton College records in the 1290s call it Iftele and Yiftele; it is Yeftley to the civil servants writing up the Domesday of Inclosures, in Latin, in 1517 – 18; Lincoln College accounts, written less formally and in English, have Ifley by 1543, and it is Iffley or Iflie during the Civil War 1642 – 46. Clearly, the sound of the name — at a time when spoken forms were dominant — was fixed by then. Afterwards the Y survived in occasional use, but only lawyers bothered with the T..."

The ending of the name of this village near Oxford, means "cleared ground": the Old English term for that was "ley" — just up the road from modern Iffley, the town of Cowley also preserves the Old English ending and meaning in its name. No records of the foundation of Iffley have been found, but the reason for its founding is clear from the location: Iffley has a little hill, and so is the first place downriver from Oxford from which traffic on the Thames might be surveyed, and controlled — and where people might be safe from floods:

"It is likely that the hill, running to 295 ft, now known as Rose Hill and Iffley, was a desirable place to live, safe from any floods. Many other villages, above and below, are set back from the river to cater for floods."

During the 12th century Oxford townsmen built a watermill at Iffley, which was bought by Lincoln College, Oxford in 1445: the mill burned in 1908, having survived for nearly 800 years. Products ground at the Iffley mill included malt, barley, corn and other cereals — for a brief time during the 15th century it was a fulling mill. The mill,

"…was notorious for its arguments between bargees and millers, who being in possession of the lock, whether it was a flash or pound lock, could preserve their head of water, and not let it flow down river, by opening the gates, as long as they wished."

In 1156 Iffley was among the holdings of the Norman family of St. Remy, until about 1200. They established Iffley as a parish, and built the parish church, "in size and decorative splendour out of all proportion to the place". The manor was owned by many, thereafter. The Archdeacons of Oxford were given the right to appoint the parish priest in 1279: they held this until 1965, when the power was given to the Dean and Chapter of Christ Church, Oxford.

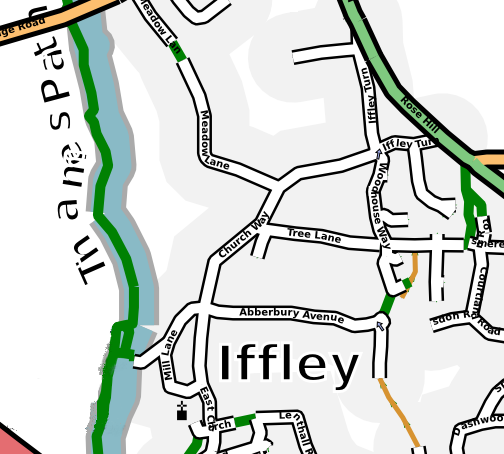
Map of Iffley village

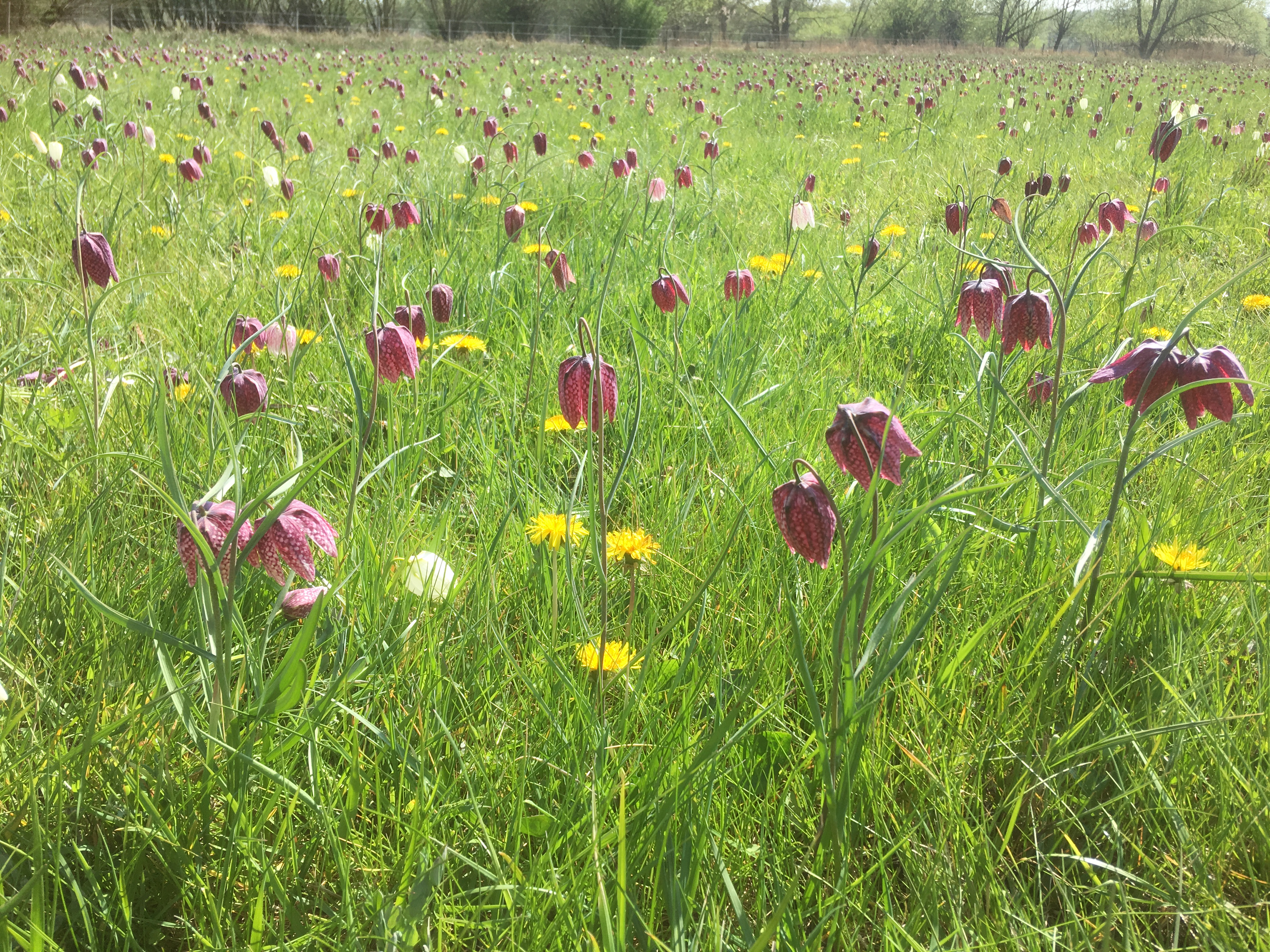
Fritillaries at Iffley Meadows

In 1921 the civil parish had a population of 405. On 1 April 1929 the parish was abolished and merged with St Giles and St John and Littlemore.

== Domesday Book entry ==
People mentioned: Abbey of St Mary of Winchcombe; Aelfgifu; Alnoth; Alric; Alwine; Azur; Bondi; Brian; Cynewig; Earl Tosti; Earl Aubrey de Coucy of Northumbria; Edwin the sheriff; Henry de Ferrers; Hugh; Hugh d'Ivry; Hugh de Bolbec; Queen Edith; Ralph; Robert; Roger; Rolf; Swein; Turold; Walter; Walter Giffard; William Peverel; William de Warenne; William fitzAnsculf. Date: 1086

== Iffley Meadows ==
Iffley Meadows is a nature reserve occupying much of Iffley Island, an area of flood-meadow on the opposite side of the Thames. The reserve is managed by the Berkshire, Buckinghamshire and Oxfordshire Wildlife Trust on behalf of Oxford City Council. The meadows are notable for their large population of snake's head fritillaries.

== Notable people ==
- Thomas Nowell (1730–1801), clergyman and historian
- Frank Bickerton (1889–1954) Antarctic explorer and World War I aviator
- John Grimley Evans (1936–2018), gerontologist
- Peggy Seeger (b.1935), American folk singer
- Stephen R. Lawhead (b. 1950), writer
- Barten Holyday (1593–1661), clergyman, poet, and translator

== See also ==
The village of Iffley has given its name to:

- St Mary the Virgin, Iffley, the parish church
- Iffley College, the original name of Wolfson College
- Iffley Halt, a former railway station on the Wycombe Railway
- Iffley Lock on the River Isis
- Iffley Mill, locally famous for the spectacular fire that burnt it down in 1908
- Iffley Road in east Oxford

== Sources ==
- Lobel, Mary D, ed. (1957). Victoria County History: A History of the County of Oxford: Volume 5: Bullingdon Hundred. pp. 189–206.
- Sherwood, Jennifer; Pevsner, Nikolaus (1974). The Buildings of England: Oxfordshire. Harmondsworth: Penguin Books. pp. 658–662. ISBN 0-14-071045-0.
