= Scott Cairns =

American poet

Scott Clifford Cairns (born 1954 in Tacoma, Washington) is an American poet, memoirist, librettist, and essayist.

== Formal education ==
Cairns earned a Bachelor of Arts degree from Western Washington University (1977), a Master of Arts degree from Hollins University (1979), a Master of Fine Arts degree from Bowling Green State University (1981), and a PhD from the University of Utah (1990).

== Academic career ==
Cairns has served on the faculties of Kansas State University, Westminster College, University of North Texas, Old Dominion University. He recently retired as Curators' Distinguished Professor of English at the University of Missouri. While at North Texas, Cairns had served as editor of the American Literary Review. He was founding director of Writing Workshops in Greece, an annual, 4-week workshop during the month of June, located in Thessaloniki and on the island of Thasos. Since 2015, he has also served on the poetry faculty of the Seattle Pacific University low-residency MFA program in creative writing, and currently serves as that program's director as it moves to Whitworth University in Spokane. With Carolyn Forché and Ilya Kaminsky, he also directs Mystikós: A Writers Retreat in Greece.

== Works ==
Cairns is the author of twelve collections of poetry, one collection of translations/adaptations of Christian mystics, one spiritual memoir (now translated into Greek and Romanian), a book-length essay on suffering (now translated into Greek), and co-edited The Sacred Place with Scott Olsen, an anthology of poetry, fiction and nonfiction. It won the inaugural National Outdoor Book Award (Outdoor Literature category) in 1997. He wrote the libretto for "The Martyrdom of Saint Polycarp", an oratorio composed by JAC Redford, and the libretto for "A Melancholy Beauty", an oratorio composed by Georgi Andreev. Cairns's poems have appeared in journals including The Atlantic Monthly, The Paris Review, The New Republic, Image, and Poetry, and have been anthologized in Upholding Mystery (Oxford University Press, 1996), Best Spiritual Writing (Harper Collins, 1998 and 2000), and Best American Spiritual Writing (Houghton Mifflin, 2004, 2005, and 2006).

== Family ==
He is married to Marcia Lane Vanderlip. They have two children.

== Awards ==
- 2006 Guggenheim Fellow
- 2014 The Denise Levertov Award

== Works ==
- Another Road Home, Poetry (July–August 2009)
- Eremite, Poetry (January 2009)
- Idiot Psalms, Poetry (January 2009)
