= Rose Hill, Oxfordshire =

Area of Oxford, England

Coordinates: 51.735°N 1.242°W

Rose Hill
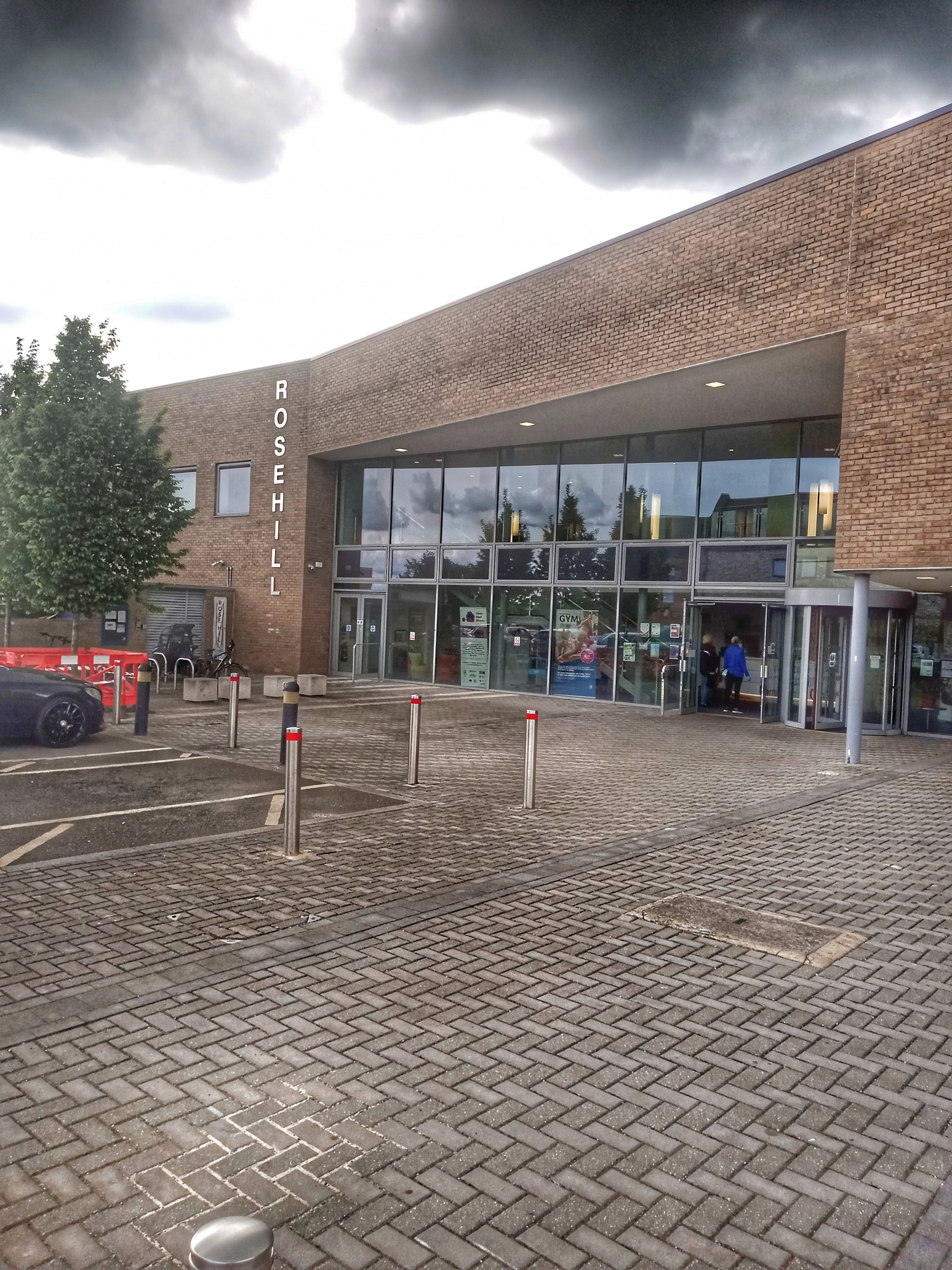
- Rose Hill Community Centre

- Location within Oxfordshire
- OS grid reference: SP530032
- District: Oxford
- Shire county: Oxfordshire
- Region: South East
- Country: England
- Sovereign state: United Kingdom
- Post town: Oxford
- Postcode district: OX4
- Dialling code: 01865
- Police: Thames Valley
- Fire: Oxfordshire
- Ambulance: South Central
- UK Parliament: Oxford East

Rose Hill is a residential area, with some housing that has been council-owned, on the southern outskirts of Oxford, England. According to the 2021 Census, the population of Rose Hill and the adjoining village of Iffley was 7,100, with 4,000 living within Rose Hill.

== Location ==
The residential estate of Rose Hill is largely to the west of the road of the same name. The road is part of a historic route from Oxford to London via Henley, running parallel to the river Isis (the name of the Thames in Oxford). The centre of Rose Hill estate is the Oval, a large expanse of grass in the centre of a turning circle. On the Oval is Rose Hill Primary School (formerly Rose Hill First). Adjacent to the Primary School is the Rose Hill Community Centre, formally opened in 2016 costing £5 million. A focal point of the road of Rose Hill is a small landscaped triangle adjacent to a row of shops built in the 1940s that have a part-timbered Tudor style facade.

== Origin ==
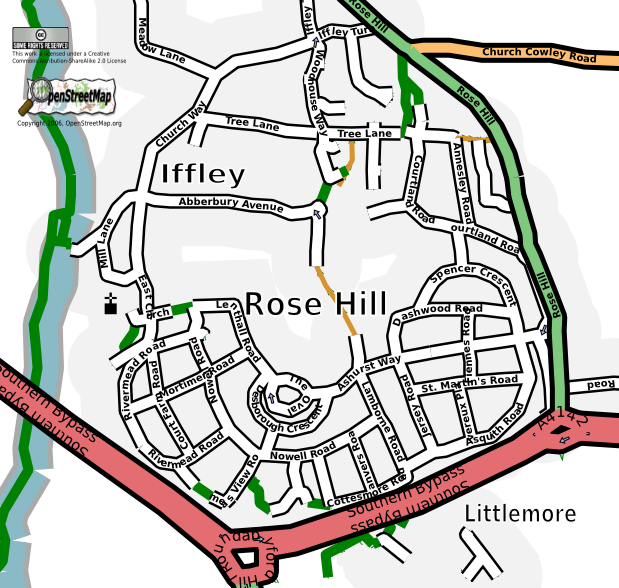
Map of Rose Hill

The toponym Rose Hill, the name of the road that is a stretch of the A4158, is derived from the name of an old farmer's cottage on the A4158. Prior to the building of the present buildings between the A4158 and Lamborne Road, the land was used primarily for agriculture. The area between Rose Hill and Annesley Road contains the site of a Roman pottery. Some specimens of the pots are in the Ashmolean Museum.

The oldest homes on the residential estate were built between 1936 and 1939 to house people from the dilapidated slum dwelling around Jericho and St. Ebbes. Much of this housing was designed by George Clark Robb (1903–80), Chief Housing Assistant to the City Engineer's Department of Oxford City Council between 1938 and 1941. Many of the streets are named after local councillors and national politicians. The most notable of these is Asquith Road, named after the UK Prime Minister and Earl of Oxford H. H. Asquith.

After the Second World War, Orlit and Self-Built homes were built in the 1950s and 60s to meet the then pressing need for accommodation, particularly for factory workers at Morris Motors Limited factory in nearby Cowley. The author of The Changing Faces of Rose Hill noted that "a second Rose Hill grew up to the south". Iffley and Church Cowley, at either end of old Rose Hill, are both ancient 'Domesday Book' villages, therefore dating from before 1087, and no doubt the fields on which Old Rose Hill now stands, were criss-crossed with paths that for a thousand years have taken people from Old Iffley to Old Cowley.

The original, Old Rose Hill, comprised farm houses and farm cottages along the main road of Rose Hill and along the lane that led from Iffley to Cowley (part of which is called Tree Lane). There is a stone towards the foot of Rose Hill marked 'Ifily Hy Way 1635'. Ifily Hy Way was then the name of the road that the council, in 1930, renamed Rose Hill. Old Rose Hill now also includes housing built from the 1920s and 1930s around the road of Rose Hill. There is an old turnpike on Rose Hill road, as a part of an old route between Oxford and London, engraved '56 miles to London'. Cardinal Newman, beatified in 2010, had connections with old Rose Hill as well as Littlemore. His mother lived on Rose Hill. Newman wrote to a friend in 1831 about his delightful room at Rose Hill from which he "could see Iffley church" and thought that the view "is too good for me". Frank Pakenham (later Lord Pakenham), who was once the prospective MP for the constituency of Oxford, also lived on old Rose Hill. His daughter Lady Antonia Fraser, novelist and biographer, who grew up in their house on the road of Rose Hill, wrote that the views over Oxford would have pleased Matthew Arnold with their distant spires, towers, college roofs'.
