= Iffley Meadows =

Island in the River Thames in Oxfordshire

Coordinates: 51.730°N 1.244°W

- Site of Special Scientific Interest
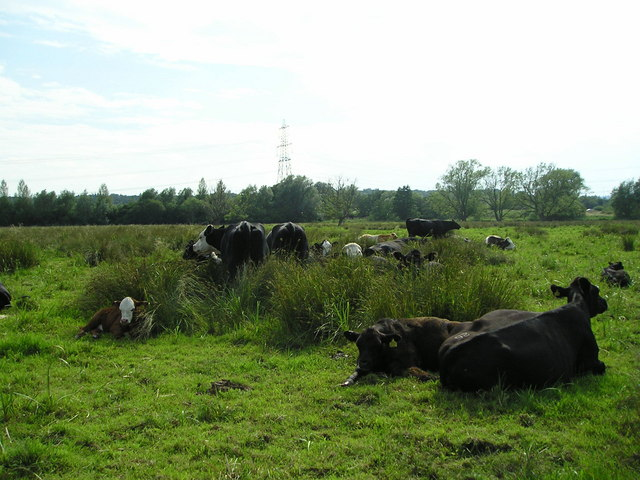
- Location of Iffley Meadows.
- Area of search: Oxfordshire
- Grid reference: SP 523 037
- Interest: Biological
- Area: 36.1 hectares (89 acres)
- Notification date: 1986
- Location map: Magic Map

Iffley Meadows is a 36.1-hectare (89-acre) biological Site of Special Scientific Interest in Oxford in Oxfordshire. It is owned by Oxford City Council and managed by the Berkshire, Buckinghamshire and Oxfordshire Wildlife Trust

These flood meadows on Iffley Island, between two arms of the River Thames, are traditionally managed for hay and pasture. A large part of the site is on clay, and it is enriched by silt each year when it is flooded. There is a rich grassland flora, with the outstanding feature being 89,000 snake's head fritillaries, which produce purple flowers in the spring. There is a network of old river channels, ditches and overgrown hedges.
