= Bye Bye Love (film) =

- Theatrical release poster
- Directed by: Sam Weisman
- Written by: Gary David Goldberg; Brad Hall
- Produced by: Gary David Goldberg; Brad Hall; Sam Weisman
- Starring: Matthew Modine; Randy Quaid; Paul Reiser; Janeane Garofalo; Rob Reiner
- Cinematography: Kenneth Zunder
- Edited by: Roger Bondelli
- Music by: J.A.C. Redford
- Production company: Ubu Productions
- Distributed by: 20th Century Fox
- Release date: March 17, 1995
- Running time: 106 minutes
- Country: United States
- Language: English
- Box office: $12.1 million

Bye Bye Love is a 1995 American romantic comedy film that deals with the central issue of divorce. It was directed by Sam Weisman and written by Gary David Goldberg and Brad Hall. It stars Matthew Modine, Randy Quaid, Paul Reiser, Janeane Garofalo, Amy Brenneman, Eliza Dushku, Rob Reiner, Amber Benson, and Lindsay Crouse. Production costs were heavily underwritten by McDonald's product placement.

Goldberg and Hall stated that they included in the script several fictionalized accounts of events that had happened to divorced friends of theirs. Also acting in the film were Jayne Brook, and Ed Flanders in his last movie role.

Bye Bye Love was released by 20th Century Fox on March 17, 1995. The film received negative reviews from critics and grossed $12.1 million.

== Plot ==
This is a story about the breakup of the family. In particular, it focuses on the lifestyle of three divorced men in the Los Angeles area, Dave Goldman (Matthew Modine), wrestling coach/driver's ed teacher Vic D'Amico (Randy Quaid), and real estate agent Donny Carson (Paul Reiser).

The film is presented from their perspective and it reveals their relationships with their children, former wives, girlfriends, male friendships, and their identities as divorced men. In addition to dealing with divorce, the film touches on spousal loss and young adult homelessness.

== Cast ==
- Matthew Modine as Dave Goldman
- Randy Quaid as Vic D'Amico
- Paul Reiser as Donny Carson
- Janeane Garofalo as Lucille
- Rob Reiner as Dr. David Townsend
- Amy Brenneman as Susan (formerly Goldman)
- Ross Malinger as Ben Goldman
- Dana Wheeler Nicholson as Heidi Schmidt
- Mae Whitman as Michelle Goldman
- Lindsay Crouse as Grace (formerly D'Amico)
- Amber Benson as Meg D'Amico
- Cameron Boyd as Jed D'Amico
- Jayne Brook as Claire Carson
- Eliza Dushku as Emma Carson
- Johnny Whitworth as Max Cooper
- Maria Pitillo as Kim
- Brad Hall as Phil
- Ed Flanders as Walter Sims
- Wendell Pierce as Hector
- Danny Masterson as Mikey
- Jack Black as DJ at party
- Stephen Root (uncredited) as Awakening neighbor
- Michael Spound as Mike

== Reception ==
The film grossed $12.1 million in the U.S. in its theatrical run. It has a 23% rating on Rotten Tomatoes based on 22 reviews. Janeane Garofalo's performance as the "date from hell" got good reviews, and earned her a nomination for an American Comedy Award. Many of the reviews complained that the movie played more like an episode of a sitcom than a feature film.

It was released on DVD on March 8, 2005, through Anchor Bay Entertainment.

== Soundtrack ==
The film's soundtrack includes performances by Linda Ronstadt, The Proclaimers, Mary Chapin Carpenter, Ben Taylor, Everly Brothers, and Jackson Browne. It was released on March 14, 1995, through Giant Records.

=== Track listing ===
No.	Title	Writer(s)	Performer	Length
1.	"Let It Be Me"	Gilbert Bécaud; Pierre Delanoë; Manny Curtis	Jackson Browne & Timothy B. Schmit	3:11
2.	"I Will"	John Lennon; Paul McCartney	Ben Taylor	3:09
3.	"Don't Worry Baby" (featuring The Beach Boys)	Brian Wilson; Roger Christian	The Everly Brothers	3:23
4.	"Bye Bye Love"	Felice Bryant; Boudleaux Bryant	The Proclaimers	2:50
5.	"Stones in the Road"	Mary Chapin Carpenter	Mary Chapin Carpenter	4:34
6.	"Our House"	Graham Nash	Crosby, Stills, Nash & Young	3:03
7.	"So Sad (To Watch Good Love Go Bad)"	Don Everly	The Everly Brothers	2:37
8.	"This Little Girl of Mine"	Ray Charles	Dave Edmunds	2:23
9.	"Falling in Love Again"	Frederick Hollander; Samuel Lerner	Linda Ronstadt	2:40
10.	"The Main Thing (Original Score Ballad)"	J.A.C. Redford	J.A.C. Redford	2:27
