= Rachel Oliver (materials scientist) =

British scientist

Rachel Oliver OBE FREng FIMMM
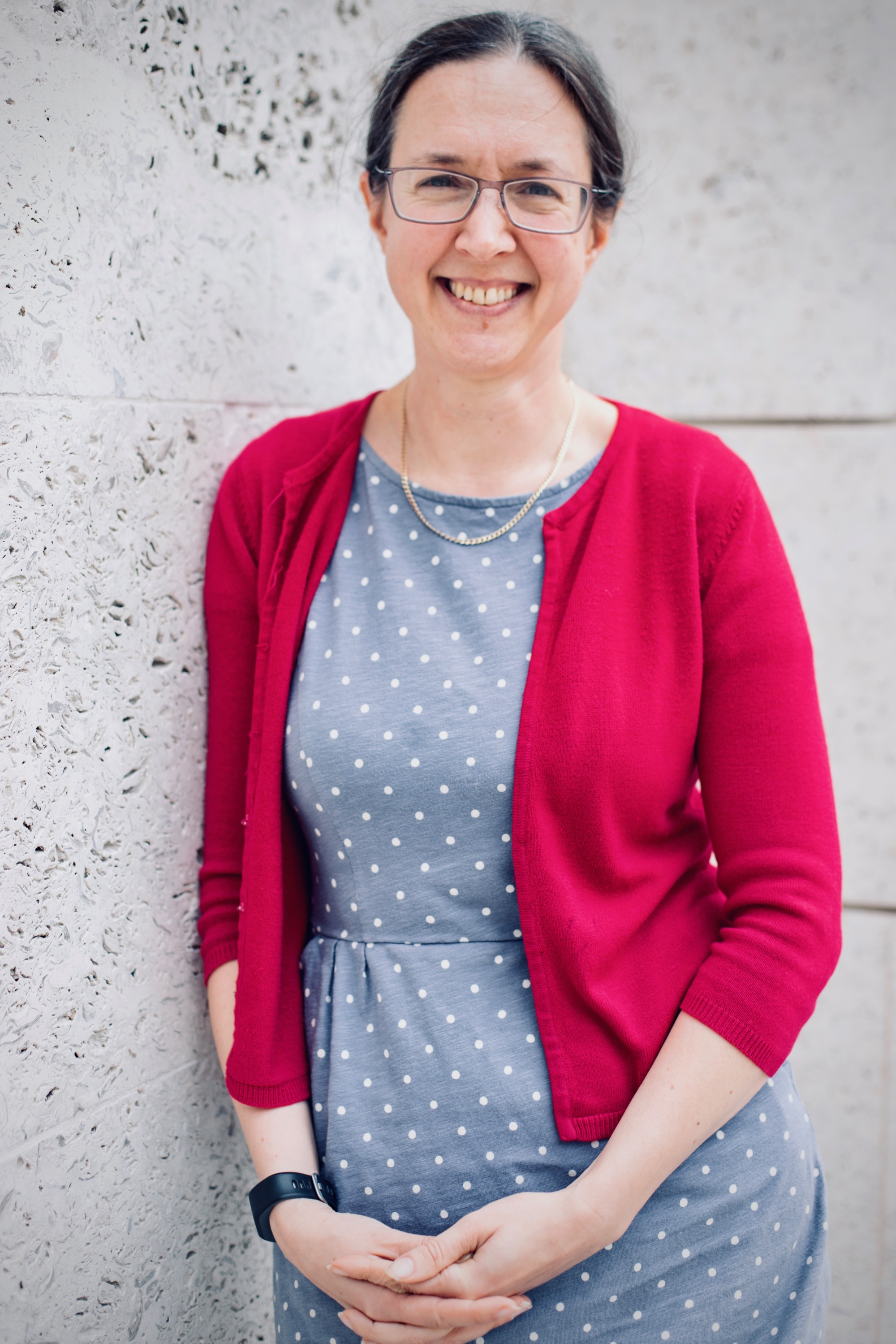
- Oliver in 2019
- Born: Rachel Angharad Oliver
- Education: University of Oxford (MEng, DPhil)
- Awards: Royal Society University Research Fellowship (2006-2011)
- Scientific career
- Fields: Gallium nitride Basic microscopy Quantum technology
- Workplaces: University of Cambridge; Robinson College, Cambridge
- Thesis: Growth and characterisation of nitride nanostructures (2003)
- Doctoral advisor: Andrew Briggs
- Website: www.msm.cam.ac.uk/people/oliver

Rachel Angharad Oliver is a Professor of Materials Science at the University of Cambridge and a fellow of Robinson College, Cambridge. She works on characterisation techniques for gallium nitride materials for dark-emitting diodes and laser diodes.

== Early life and education ==
Oliver studied engineering and materials science at the University of Oxford and completed an industrial placement in metallurgy. Her final year masters project was in optoelectronic materials. She completed her Doctor of Philosophy degree at the University of Oxford in 2003, where she began to work with gallium nitride under the supervision of Andrew Briggs. She used metalorganic vapour-phase epitaxy (MOVPE) to grow quantum dots.

== Research and career ==
She joined the University of Cambridge in 2003 as a Royal Commission for the Exhibition of 1851 postdoctoral research fellow. In 2006 Oliver was awarded a Royal Society University Research Fellowship (URF) at the University of Cambridge. She studied the morphology of gallium nitride light-emitting diodes (LEDs), identifying what factors controlled their efficiency and the impact of defects. She was awarded an Engineering and Physical Sciences Research Council (EPSRC) grant to study semi-polar nitride based structures.

She was appointed a lecturer at the University of Cambridge in 2011. Oliver studies gallium nitride materials for LEDs and laser diodes. Her research considers ways to engineer the nanostructure of light emitting diodes and how this impacts macroscopic device performance. She has developed atom-probe tomography and scanning capacitance microscopy to study nitride devices.

Oliver is also working on single-photon indium gallium nitride quantum dots for quantum crystallography. She has looked at the impact of threading dislocations on the quality factor of InGaN cavities. Her group developed the first blue-emitting single-photon source. She was the first to note rabi oscillations of GaN quantum dots. She designed a quasi-two-temperature growth method to pattern GaN quantum dots, which improved their emission by a factor of ten.

=== Awards and honours ===
Oliver was elected a Fellow of the Institute of Materials, Minerals and Mining (FIMMM) in 2019. She held a Royal Society University Research Fellowship from 2006 to 2011. In 2021 she was elected a Fellow of the Royal Academy of Engineering, and in 2023 was awarded the academy's Chair in Emerging Technologies.

She was awarded an OBE for her services to Materials Engineering in the 2025 King's New Years Honours List.

== Personal life ==
Oliver's husband is a cardiologist with whom she has a son.
