= The Penultimate Curiosity =

2016 book by Roger Wagner and Andrew Briggs

- Authors: Roger Wagner and Andrew Briggs
- Language: English, Spanish
- Genre: History of science
- Publisher: Oxford University Press
- Publication date: February 2016
- Publication place: United Kingdom
- Media type: Print (Hardcover)
- Pages: 496
- ISBN: 978-0-19-874795-6

The Penultimate Curiosity: How science swims in the slipstream of ultimate questions is a book jointly written by English author and artist Roger Wagner and English scientist Andrew Briggs, which sets out to answer one of the most important, vexed, and profound questions about the development of human thought: "What lies at the root of the long entanglement between science and religion?"

In a prologue Wagner and Briggs begin by describing the entrances to the University Museum in Oxford and the Cavendish Laboratory in Cambridge. On the former there is a sculpture of an angel, on the latter a quotation from psalm 111: "the works of the Lord are great sought out of all them that have pleasure therein". Their book, they suggest, is an attempt to answer the question of how this sculpture and inscription got there. Rather than directly addressing the question of whether science and religion are compatible, Wagner and Briggs examine the nature of the relationship between them.

Their first move is to consider the connection between the earliest evidences of human religion and early evidences of interest in the natural world. Drawing on recent discoveries of cave art and developments in the cognitive science of religion, they suggest that when the need to make sense of the world as a whole ("ultimate curiosity") began to become central to maintaining the coherence of human communities, this created a kind of slipstream in which various kinds of interest in the natural world (penultimate curiosities) were able to travel. They further suggest that particular configurations of this "slipstream" (particular ways of making sense of the world) have been especially conducive to motivating an interest in the natural world.

Their second move is then to follow the way that particular religious ideas have shaped and motivated scientific thinking. They describe the way that the development in Greek religious thought of the idea of a divine arche – a source or principle – giving a rational coherence to the universe, influenced Greek scientific thinking for almost a thousand years. They then go on to describe the interaction between Greek thinking and early Jewish and Christian thought. Their focus here is on the Alexandrian Christian philosopher John Philoponus, and his argument that the heavens and the earth are made of the same materials and may be governed by the same principle.

From there Wagner and Briggs go on to follow these ideas through Islamic and medieval Christian thought, and it is in respect of the latter that another theme begins to emerge. Their original slipstreaming metaphor suggested that religious ideas could motivate scientific thinking. However, when science is made to answer religious questions or vice versa confusion can result, as when slipstreaming cyclists in the Tour de France have a clash of wheels producing a chute or pile up. Galileo's persecution is cited as an example of this kind of chute, and when the speed of scientific advance increases, they suggest, these kinds of chutes can become more frequent.

Thus while describing how emerging features of religious thought, like the reformation insistence on examining the words (and also the works) of God for yourself, fed into the development of experimental science, they also describe how the weaponisation of science in the battle for intellectual credibility produced some of the modern tensions between scientific and religious ideas.

In an excursus towards the end of the book Wagner and Briggs trace the origins of a particular configuration that they call "the religious idea of penultimacy" in the Biblical idea of a creator God who cannot be identified with his creation; and explore what the cuneiform texts that began to be discovered and translated in the 19th century, reveal about them.

The final section of the book describes how these ideas influenced two men: Henry Acland who was responsible for the sculpture at the Oxford University Museum, and James Clerk Maxwell who was responsible for the inscription at Cambridge.

A concluding epilogue brings the story up to date, arguing that contemporary attempts to use science to discredit religion are themselves evidence of "the entrenched need of human beings to make sense of the whole depth of their experience", and are "rooted in the cognitive capacities that...first gave rise to homo religiosus".

== Reception ==
The book has so far been translated into Chinese, Spanish and Portuguese.

Reviewing the book in the Financial Times John Cornwell remarked on its "generally irenic tone" and describes it as a "gripping work of history and reference that deserves to be read on both sides of the science-art divide".

Reviewing the book in the Times Higher Education Supplement Richard Joyner wrote that "to me as an atheist ... Wagner and Briggs' first premise is wrong and their second confusing", but nevertheless argued that "their book is well worth reading". The reviews in more specialist publications echo this last appraisal.

The CERN Courier suggests that the book shows how science and religion "can live in a mutually enriching relationship". Writing in the Church Times Richard Harries describes it as "an exceptionally ambitious and wide-ranging book which approaches the rather stale debate of religion and science with a fresh historical perspective".

In a longer academic review in The Ship, St Anne's College Journal, Howard Hotson, Professor of Early Modern Intellectual History at Oxford, wrote that in a culture in which modernity is so often defined in terms of secularization, and religion so often conceived as the archenemy of science, "it seems paradoxical to find glowing testimonials on the dust jacket of The Penultimate Curiosity from the Astronomer Royal and the Director General of CERN alongside the former Chief Rabbi and the current Archbishop of Canterbury." Hotson describes how the book's thesis "at its most impressively robust" is illustrated in the "process in which the heritage of Greek natural philosophy and mathematics was reshaped by dialogue with the deepest principles of Judeo-Christian-Islamic monotheism and vice versa", adding that "Wagner and Briggs are themselves swimming in the slipstream of a huge amount of patient scholarly work undertaken at an exponentially accelerating rate".

== Books based on The Penultimate Curiosity ==
A set of books for children based on The Penultimate Curiosity under the series title The Curious Science Quest were written by award-winning children's author Julia Golding with Andrew Briggs and Roger Wagner, describe the time-travelling adventures of Harriet, Darwin's pet tortoise, and Milton, Schrödinger's indecisive cat.
