= David Britz =

American scientist and engineer

David Alexander Britz (born November 23, 1980) is an American scientist and engineer who is best known for his contributions to the field of materials science and nanotechnology.

In 2004, Britz and his colleagues at Oxford and the University of Nottingham won a place in the Guinness Book of World Records for creating the world's smallest test tube, by performing chemical reactions inside carbon nanotubes: "the nanotube has an inner diameter of approximately 1.2 nanometres, and a length of about 2 micrometers. Its volume is two zeptolitres (a zeptolitre is 10^{−21} litres), and around 2,000 molecules react in that space."

Britz graduated magna cum laude from the University of Virginia School of Engineering and Applied Science in Mechanical Engineering. Following, he went on to obtain a Master of Business Administration Degree from MIT Sloan School of Management. He completed his Doctor of Philosophy in Materials Science in the UK at the University of Oxford, Christ Church, Oxford college in the Department of Materials, and completed his doctoral thesis, titled "Structure and Bonding of Fullerenes and Nanotubes", in 2005. During his work at Oxford, David Britz created more than ten new carbon nanotube- and fullerene-based materials and processes. He has been awarded Honorable Mention for the 2002 National Science Foundation Graduate Research Fellowship.

Dave Britz also competed for Oxford University in the 2005 Varsity Boxing Match against Cambridge, earning a Full Blue.

Britz worked for the nanotechnology company Eikos in Franklin, Massachusetts, and developed carbon nanotube inks for highly conductive transparent coatings and circuits to be used in a variety of ways, including for use in solar cells, the commercial displays market, and military applications. He lives in Boston, Massachusetts.

David A. Britz also coauthored a 2006 critical review on noncovalent interactions between molecules and single-walled carbon nanotubes published in Chemical Society Reviews.

Britz has been granted 19 patents during his career with 17 still active. Most of these patents are related to aerospace components.

David Britz participated in the 3M Strategic Business Development Summer Olympics in 2012.

In 2025, at the 31st Symposium on Photomask and NGL Mask Technology, David Britz spoke as the keynote speaker for the session "Living at the Edge: Shaping the Future of Edge AI with Applied Materials."

David A. Britz is currently working at Applied Materials as Managing Director, Strategic & Product Marketing since January 2024.
