= Vassar Miller =

American writer

Vassar Miller (July 19, 1924 – October 31, 1998) was an American writer and poet. She served as Poet Laureate of Texas (1988–1989).

== Biography ==
Miller was born in Houston, Texas, the daughter of real estate investor Jesse G. Miller. She began writing as a child, composing on a typewriter due to the cerebral palsy which affected her speech and movement. She attended the University of Houston, receiving her B.A. and M.A. in English.

In 1956, Miller published her first volume of poetry, Adam's Footprint. Her poems, most of which dealt with either her strong religious faith or her experiences as a person with a disability, were widely praised for their rigorous formality, clarity, and emotional impact. Her poems have been published in hundreds of periodicals and more than 50 anthologies, including Spanish translations in Latin American journals. The lasting power of Ms. Miller's poetry and its distinctiveness was aptly described by many, including author Larry McMurtry. Reflecting on the qualities that make the work of only a few artists survive, Mr. McMurtry wrote of Vassar Miller and her poetry: “It’s easy to point out her clarity, her precision, her intelligence, her honesty. But I want to mention one other quality that I think she has both as a person and as a poet, and that is her tenacity. It’s not simply brute survival that a poet is involved with, although sometimes they are; it’s more than that. It’s a tenacity that has to be at one and the same time, physical, intellectual, and moral. I believe this tenacity is something that Vassar Miller is richly endowed with.”

Over the course of a literary career which spanned almost forty years, Miller published ten volumes of poetry in all. Vassar Miller's ten volumes of poetry, published between 1956 and 1984 were collected in 1991 under the title If I Had Wheels or Love. An outspoken advocate for the rights and dignity of the handicapped, Miller also edited a collection of poetry and short stories about persons with disabilities titled Despite This Flesh. Miller received many awards and accolades for her poetry in her home state. Three of her books won the annual poetry prize of the Texas Institute of Letters. In 1982 and 1988 Miller was named Poet Laureate of Texas, and in 1997 she was named to the Texas Women's Hall of Fame by the Governor's Commission for Women.

In addition to her writing and teaching, Ms. Miller was involved in civic work and in 1989 the Young Women's Christian Association named her an Outstanding Woman of Houston. Vassar Miller died October 31, 1998.

== Bibliography ==
=== Books ===
- If I Had Wheels or Love, Southern Methodist University Press, 1991.
- Despite This Flesh, University of Texas Press, 1985.
- Struggling to Swim on Concrete, New Orleans Poetry Journal Press, 1984.
- Selected and New Poems, 1950-1980, Latitudes Press, 1981.
- Approaching Nada, Wings Press, 1977.
- Small Change, Wings Press, 1976.
- If I Could Sleep Deeply Enough, Liveright, 1974.
- Onions and Roses, Wesleyan University Press, 1968.
- My Bones Being Wiser, Wesleyan University Press, 1963.
- Wage War on Silence, Wesleyan University Press, 1960.
- Adam's Footprint, New Orleans Poetry Journal, 1956.

=== Criticism ===
- Heart's Invention: On the Poetry of Vassar Miller, introduction by Larry McMurtry, ed. Steven Ford Brown, Ford-Brown & Co., Publishers, 1988
