= Stephanie Simmons =

Canadian Research Chair in Quantum Computing

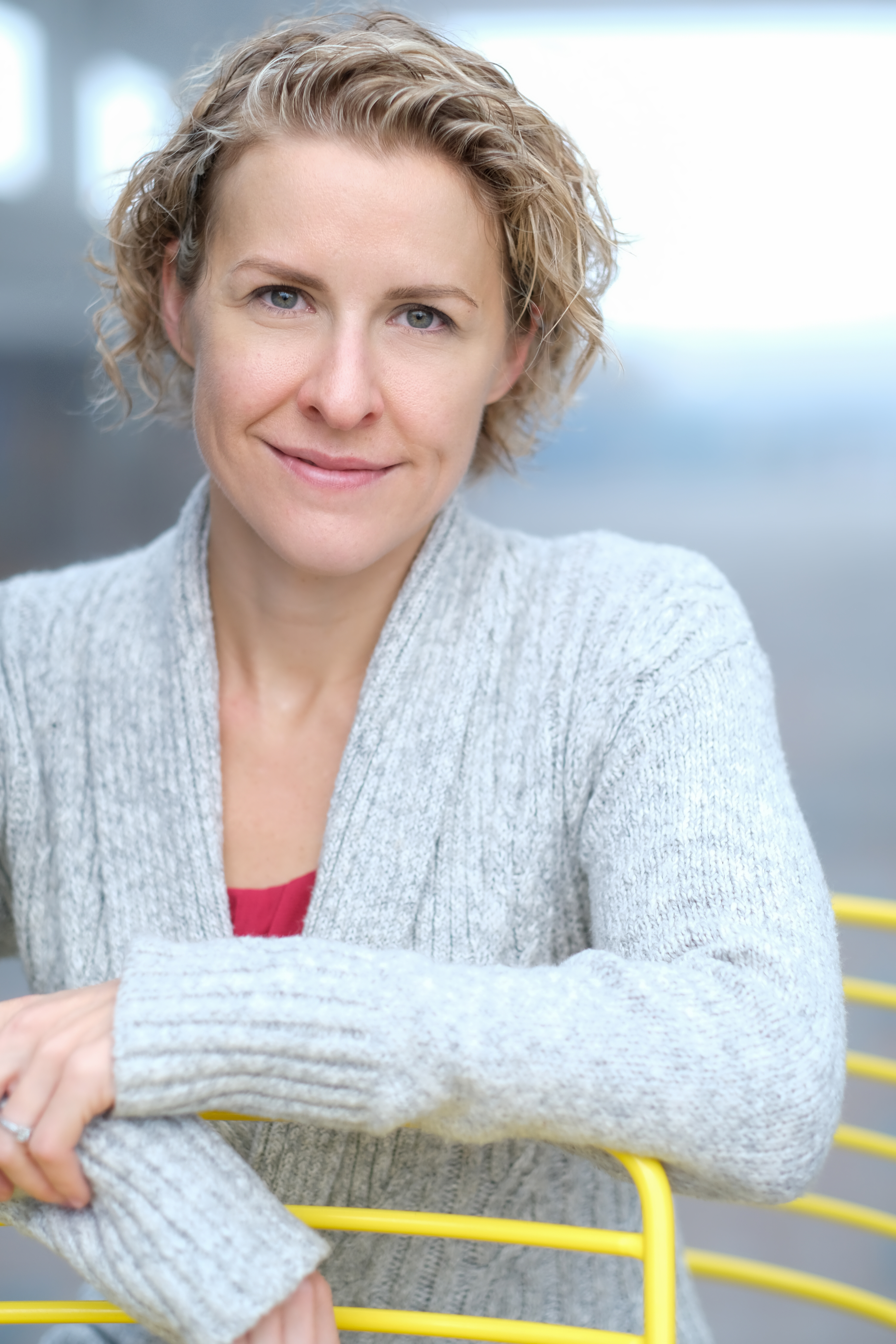
- Dr. Stephanie Simmons
- Education: University of Waterloo; University of Oxford
- Scientific career
- Workplaces: Simon Fraser University; University of New South Wales; Photonic Inc.
- Thesis: Creation and control of entanglement in condensed matter spin systems. (2011)

Stephanie Simmons is the co-chair of the Advisory Council on Canada's National Quantum Strategy and a Canadian Research Chair in Quantum Computing at Simon Fraser University. She is also the founder and Chief Quantum Officer at Photonic Inc., a spin out company which focusses on the commercial development of silicon photonics spin qubits. She was named by Caldwell Partners as one of Canada's Top 40 Under 40 in 2020. Her research considers the development of silicon-based systems for quantum computing.

== Early life and education ==
Simmons started her scientific career at the University of Waterloo as an undergraduate student in mathematics and mathematical physics. She moved to the United Kingdom for her graduate research, where she worked toward her doctorate in materials science at the University of Oxford. She was a Clarendon Scholar at Magdalen College, Oxford. Her doctoral research looked at the creation of entanglement in condensed matter spin systems.

== Research and career ==
Simmons was a research fellow in electrical engineering at the University of New South Wales. In Australia she worked with Andrea Morello on silicon-based quantum computing. She was part of the UNSW team who first demonstrated quantum logic between two electrons in a silicon chip. Using a conventional semiconductor manufacturing process, Simmons worked on a controlled-not gate (CNOT) that makes use of electron spin to store quantum information.

Simmons joined the faculty at Simon Fraser University in 2015, where she leads the Silicon Quantum Technology laboratory. Her research focuses on the qubits associated with luminescent defects in silicon. She was named a Canada Research Chair in 2017, and concentrated her efforts on the development of the world's first quantum computer. She has advised the Canadian government on quantum technology.

== Awards and honours ==
- 2013 Physics World Top Ten Breakthrough of the Year
- 2015 Physics World Top Ten Breakthrough of the Year
- 2020 Canada's Top 40 Under 40
- 2021 YWCA Women of Distinction Award
- 2022 Arthur B. McDonald Fellowship

== Select publications ==
- M Veldhorst; Henry Yang; J C C Hwang; et al. (5 October 2015). "A two-qubit logic gate in silicon". Nature. 526 (7573): 410–414. arXiv:1411.5760. doi:10.1038/nature15263. ISSN 1476-4687. PMID 26436453. Wikidata Q51576519.
- Kamyar Saeedi; Stephanie Simmons; Jeff Z Salvail; et al. (1 November 2013). "Room-temperature quantum bit storage exceeding 39 minutes using ionized donors in silicon-28". Science. 342 (6160): 830–833. arXiv:2303.17734. doi:10.1126/science.1239584. ISSN 0036-8075. PMID 24233718. Wikidata Q34385184.
- Stephanie Simmons; Richard M Brown; Helge Riemann; et al. (19 January 2011). "Entanglement in a solid-state spin ensemble". Nature. 470 (7332): 69–72. arXiv:1010.0107. doi:10.1038/nature09696. ISSN 1476-4687. PMID 21248751. Wikidata Q51611621.

== Personal life ==
Simmons has two children.
