= Roger Wagner (artist) =

English artist and poet

Roger Wagner (born 1957) is an English artist and poet.

== Biography ==
Born in 1957 in London, Roger Wagner won an open scholarship to read English Literature at Lincoln College, Oxford in 1975. While a student he attended classes at the Ruskin School of Drawing, where he now teaches, and in 1977 edited The Oxford Art Journal, the forerunner of the present academic journal that began the following year. From 1978 to 1981 he studied at The Royal Academy Schools under Peter Greenham, and subsequently returned to Oxford where he now lives and works.

In 1985 he had his first exhibition with Anthony Mould who has represented him ever since. Alongside the paintings were wood-engravings from his first book of illustrated poems Fire Sonnets. An exhibition in 1988, In a Strange Land, included a book of that title which included poems and a translation of psalm 137 illustrated with wood-engravings of the London docklands. Several more recent exhibitions have included successive volumes of The Book of Praises: an illustrated translation of the psalms, the first volume of which appeared in 1994. This was the year of his retrospective exhibition at the Ashmolean Museum in Oxford, whose attendance figures broke all records. In 2004 the Ashmolean had a second exhibition of his work to celebrate the acquisition of his large painting Menorah which now hangs on permanent loan in St Giles Church.

In 2012 he made his first stained glass window, opposite John Piper’s window in St Mary’s Iffley, followed by a font cover made in collaboration with Nicholas Mynheer. Both were nominated for the ACE prize for art in a sacred context. In 2014 he painted the first portrait of the new Archbishop of Canterbury, Justin Welby, which now hangs alongside Thomas Lawrence’s portraits in Auckland Castle. In 2016 Oxford University Press published The Penultimate Curiosity co-authored with Andrew Briggs, the Professor of Nanomaterials at Oxford.In 2019 The Canterbury Press published The Nearer You Stand, Poems and Images. In 2020 The Canterbury Press published The Book of Praise, Translations from the Psalms. In 2022 he was elected an Honorary Fellow of Lincoln College Oxford.

=== Style and influences ===
Wagner’s work has been described as ‘totally unlike any other modern artist’. In 1988 the poet Peter Levi wrote of his second exhibition that ‘Nothing could be less expected than his paintings; they are completely careless of fashion. In some ways they are very old fashioned indeed, but in the most important way modern. He has the power to create a myth’.

An early influence was the painting of Giorgio de Chirico whom he met in Venice in 1973. Chirico described his own style as ‘metaphysical’ and though very different the same term could be applied to Wagner’s work. This has been described as ‘imbued with Fra Angelico, Blake, Palmer and Traherne’, but it also often imbued with what Samuel Johnson described as a characteristic of the metaphysical poets in which ‘the most heterogeneous ideas are yoked by violence together’. Thus Rowan Williams has described Wagner’s ‘fusion of Jewish and Christian symbols with the cooling towers of Didcot power station – Jewish victims of the Shoah wandering in the neighbourhood of a distantly seen, conventionally depicted crucifixion, the background dominated by the immense towers arranged in the pattern of the ceremonial candlestick, the menorah that gives this 1993 painting its title.’, as this is ‘very dense imagining indeed, but it manages a representation of the creatively and theologically uncanny that is haunting’.

== Collections ==
- NatWest Collection, London
- The Takeover Panel, City of London
- The Ashmolean Museum, Oxford
- St Giles Church, Oxford
- Auckland Castle
- Dioezesanmuseum, Regensburg
- The Fitzwilliam Museum Cambridge

== Bibliography ==
- Fire Sonnets, The Besalel Press 1984
- In a Strange Land, The Besalel Press 1988
- The Book of Praises: A Translation of the Psalms, The Besalel Press 1994
- A Silent Voice, The Besalel Press 1996
- Out of the Whirlwind, Solway 1997
- Art and Faith, in Public Life and the Place of the Church, Ashgate 2006
- The Book of Praises: A Translation of the Psalms (Book Two), The Besalel Press 2008
- The Book of Praises: A Translation of the Psalms (Book Three), The Besalel Press 2013
- The Penultimate Curiosity (with Andrew Briggs) OUP 2016
- The Nearer You Stand, Poems and Images , Canterbury Press 2019
- The Book of Praises Translations from the Psalms Canterbury Press 2020
