= Malcolm Guite =

English poet, academic and Anglican priest (born 1957)

The Reverend Malcolm Guite
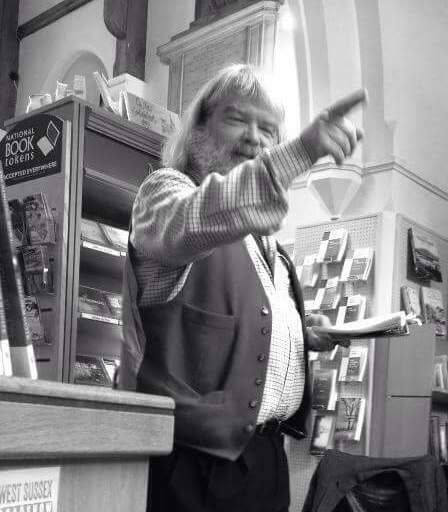
- Guite at a poetry reading in 2014
- Born: Ayodeji Malcolm Guite; 12 November 1957 (age 69); Ibadan, Oyo State, Federation of Nigeria
- Education: Pembroke College, Cambridge (MA); Durham University (PhD)
- Occupations: Poet, priest, singer-songwriter, academic
- Writing career
- Language: English
- Genres: Poetry, Christian theology, literary criticism
- Subjects: Poetry, literature, Christian theology and apologetics
- Notable works: The Singing Bowl, Sounding the Seasons, David's Crown
- Website: malcolmguite.wordpress.com

Ayodeji Malcolm Guite (/ɡaɪt/; born 12 November 1957) is an English poet, singer-songwriter, Anglican priest and academic. Born in Nigeria to British expatriate parents, Guite earned degrees from the University of Cambridge and Durham University. His research interests include the intersection of religion and the arts, and the examination of the works of J. R. R. Tolkien, C. S. Lewis and Owen Barfield, and British poets such as Samuel Taylor Coleridge. He was a Bye-Fellow and chaplain of Girton College, Cambridge, and an associate chaplain of St Edward King and Martyr, Cambridge. On several occasions, he has taught as visiting faculty at several colleges and universities in England and North America.

Guite is the author of five books of poetry, including two chapbooks and three full-length collections, as well as several books on Christian faith and theology. Guite has a decisively simple, formalist style in his poems, many of which are sonnets, and he stated that his aim is to "be profound without ceasing to be beautiful." Guite performs as a singer and guitarist fronting the Cambridgeshire-based blues, rhythm and blues, and rock band Mystery Train. He also has a YouTube page, where he shares his passions and musings with his viewers.

== Early life and education ==
Guite was born on 12 November 1957 in Ibadan, Oyo State, in the Federation of Nigeria. At birth, he was given the first name Ayodeji which is a Yoruba tribal name meaning "the second joy". According to Guite, the name was suggested to his mother by the Yoruba nurse who attended to her through a difficult childbirth and who Guite states probably saved his and his mother's lives. His parents were British expatriates living in Nigeria, where his father was a Methodist lay preacher who travelled around the country evangelising. His father also taught as lecturer in classics at the University of Ibadan. According to Guite, after ten years in Nigeria, his father, "ever the wanderer, went and got a job in Canada, where we then moved".

Although his family had settled in Canada, his parents thought he was losing his British identity and decided to enroll him in boarding school in England where he spent his teenage years. He attended the Haberdashers' Aske's Boys' School in Elstree, Hertfordshire. He describes the boarding school experience as terrible, an "atmosphere of guilt, oppression and general alienation" where he strayed from his childhood Christian faith. In its place, Guite embraced a "rational scientific materialism" coloured by B.F. Skinner's behaviourism and the existentialism of Jean-Paul Sartre and Samuel Beckett.

During these years, Guite says that he was not sure whether he belonged in England or in Canada. In the end, however, he decided that he belonged in England after winning a scholarship to Pembroke College, Cambridge to read English and after discovering "real ale"—something he says "they don't have properly in Canada at all". Guite adds that after these two events he "fell in love with Cambridge, and I've never quite escaped its gravitational pull". Guite returned gradually to his Christian faith, first under the influence of beauty in the poetry of John Keats and Percy Bysshe Shelley and visits to historical sites that had deep religious significance—Rome, the Irish village of Glencolmcille and the island of Iona in the Inner Hebrides. After delving into the works of Keats and Shelley, Guite decided to begin writing poetry. In his final year of undergraduate study, Guite states that he had a religious experience writing a literary paper analysing the Psalms that he likened to a conversion experience. He chose to be confirmed in the Church of England shortly after.

Guite graduated from Cambridge with a Bachelor of Arts (BA), later automatically upgraded to Master of Arts (MA (Cantab)) in English Literature in 1980. After graduating, Guite taught for several years as a secondary-school teacher before deciding to seek a doctoral degree, and obtained his Doctor of Philosophy (PhD) from Durham University in 1993. His doctoral dissertation focused on "the centrality of memory as a theme in the sermons and meditations of Lancelot Andrewes and John Donne and to explore the extent of their influence on the treatment of memory in T.S. Eliot's poetry". While researching the topic of his dissertation, in considering the struggles of John Donne with a similar question in the early seventeenth-century, Guite began to wonder if God was calling him too to be a priest.

== Career ==
Guite was ordained as a priest in the Church of England in 1991. As a deacon he was first assigned to a parish on "the Oxmoor estate in Huntingdon". He described this period as not having much time for writing sonnets, saying: "being a priest and a poet feels a very natural combination now. It didn’t at first". He put poetry aside for seven years, "in order to concentrate on and learn deeply my priestly vocation, and life in my parishes was totally absorbing and demanding so it felt right to let the other fields lie fallow".

Guite teaches in the pastoral theology graduate programme at the Cambridge Theological Federation where he frequently advises "clergy who are returning to academia to do a dissertation to reflect on their often amazing parish experiences". From 2003 he was chaplain and Bye-Fellow of Girton College, Cambridge. Guite also lectures regularly in the United States and Canada, including visiting positions at Duke Divinity School and Regent College. Guite describes the focus of his research interests as "the interface between theology and the arts, more specifically Theology and Literature" and "special interests in Coleridge and C. S. Lewis" as well as J. R. R. Tolkien and British poets. Since October 2014 Guite has been a visiting research fellow at St John's College, Durham.

Guite performs as a singer and guitarist fronting the Cambridgeshire-based blues, rhythm and blues, and rock band Mystery Train. He has collaborated with Canadian singer-songwriter Steve Bell for several tracks on a 4-CD set by Bell called Pilgrimage that was released in 2014 by Signpost Music. Since then he has collaborated with Bell on several tracks, including The Glad Surprise (2025). A complete collection of their collaborations, including two previously unreleased songs and entitled The Bell and the Bard, will be released in 2026.

In January 2017 Guite was interviewed on BBC Radio 4's Great Lives Series, together with Suzannah Lipscomb, on how C. S. Lewis had inspired her life.

Guite writes the weekly "Poet's Corner" column for the Church Times, an Anglican newspaper. He has also been interviewed several times on the newspaper's podcast.

== Poetry and persona ==
"He who has ears to hear let him hear"

How hard to hear the things I think I know,
To peel aside the thin familiar film
That wraps and seals your secret just below:
An undiscovered good, a hidden realm,
A kingdom of reversal, where the poor
Are rich in blessing and the tragic rich
Still struggle, trapped in trappings at the door
They never opened, Life just out of reach...

—Malcolm Guite, from "Parable and Paradox"

Guite's poetry has been characterised as modern-day metaphysical poems and psalms. Guite's poetry tends to conform to traditional forms, especially the sonnet, and employs both rhyme and metre. The former Archbishop of Canterbury, Rowan Williams, remarked that Guite "knows exactly how to use the sonnet form to powerful effect" and that his poems "offer deep resources for prayer and meditation to the reader". Concerning Guite's collection Sounding the Seasons, the English poet and literary critic Grevel Lindop remarked: "using the sonnet form with absolute naturalness as he traces the year and its festivals, he offers the reader—whether Christian or not—profound and beautiful utterance which is patterned but also refreshingly spontaneous." Guite has stated that his aim is to "be profound without ceasing to be beautiful." He has said that a poet can discuss emotions like sorrow without having to lose form, and specifically that the goal of his style contrasts a lot of modern poetry which he states tends to be "quite difficult, jagged and rebarbative; a lot of modern poetry deliberately eschews form or beauty, and is almost deliberately trying to put the reader off." Citing these difficulties, Guite recounted that his entry into poetry was aided by engaging the lyrics of the singer-songwriters Bob Dylan and Leonard Cohen.

Holly Ordway, Professor of English at Houston Christian University, writes that "Guite helps us see clearly and deeply how poetry allows us to know truth in a different but complementary way to propositional, rational argument" in her review of Faith, Hope, and Poetry: Theology and the Poetic Imagination. In a review of Guite's collection The Singing Bowl, Kevin Belmonte, a Huffington Post contributor who has written biographies of William Wilberforce and G. K. Chesterton, describes Guite as a "questing poet" whose poems "point to places of possibility—in everything—from the commonplace to the transcendent" and explore "what it means to persist in the presence of a God who hears and knows us in time of trouble". Belmonte has further characterised Guite as an English national treasure.

Guite has commented in interviews that he has been influenced by the works of the poets Seamus Heaney, T. S. Eliot and George Herbert, and that he holds Herbert's poem "Bitter-Sweet" dearly. In discussing the impact Herbert's poem has on his views, he said "what I see Herbert saying in that poem is that we take our passions, and sometimes our faults and our brokenness and our stains, and we let God anneal his story. So there's some point in which we become a window of grace". Guite has described himself in interviews as "a poet, priest, rock & roller, in any order you like, really. I'm the same person in all three."

== Works ==
=== Discography ===
- 2007: Malcolm Guite: The Green Man and other songs
- 2011: Dancing through the Fire

=== Poetry ===
- 2002: Saying the Names
- 2004: The Magic Apple Tree
- 2012: Sounding the Seasons: Seventy sonnets for Christian year (Canterbury Press Norwich) ISBN 978-1-84825-274-5
- 2013: The Singing Bowl (Canterbury Press Norwich) ISBN 978-1-84825-541-8
- 2016: Parable and Paradox (Canterbury Press) ISBN 9781848258594
- 2017: Love, Remember: 40 Poems of Loss, Lament and Hope (Canterbury Press Norwich) ISBN 9781786220011
- 2019: After Prayer (Canterbury Press) ISBN 9781786222107
- 2021: David's Crown (Canterbury Press) ISBN 9781786223067
- 2026: Galahad and the Grail: Merlin's Isle Volume 1 (Canterbury Press) ISBN 9781786227126}
- 2026: The Coming of Arthur: Merlin's Isle Volume 2 (Canterbury Press) ISBN 9781786227287}
- 2027: Days of the Round Table: Merlin's Isle Volume 3 (Canterbury Press)
- 2028: The Passing of Arthur: Merlin's Isle Volume 4 (Canterbury Press)}

=== Christian theology and practice ===
- 2000: Beholding the Glory: Incarnation through the Arts, Jeremy S. Begbie (Editor), (Baker Academic) ISBN 978-0-8010-2244-9
- 2008: What Do Christians Believe?: Belonging and Belief in Modern Christianity (Walker & Company) ISBN 978-0-8027-1640-8
- 2012: Faith, Hope and Poetry: Theology and the Poetic Imagination (Ashgate, Ashgate Studies in Theology, Imagination and the Arts) ISBN 978-1-4094-4936-2
- 2014: Reflections for Lent 2015 (Church House Publishing) (as chapter contributor)
- 2014: Word in the Wilderness (Hymns Ancient & Modern Ltd) ISBN 978-1-84825-678-1 (as editor)
- 2015: Waiting on the Word: A Poem a Day for Advent, Christmas, and Epiphany (Canterbury Press) ISBN 978-1-84825-800-6
- 2017: Mariner: A Voyage with Samuel Taylor Coleridge (Hodder & Stoughton) ISBN 978-1473611054
- 2018: In Every Corner Sing: A Poet's Corner Collection (Canterbury Press Norwich) ISBN 9781786220974
- 2020: Heaven in Ordinary: A Poet's Corner Collection (Canterbury Press Norwich) ISBN 9781786222626
- 2021: Lifting the Veil: Imagination and the Kingdom of God (Square Halo Books) ISBN 9781941106228
- 2022: The Word Within the Words (Darton, Longman, and Todd) ISBN 978-1-5064-8433-4
- 2023: Ordinary Saints: Living Everyday Life to the Glory of God (Square Halo Books) ISBN 9781941106297 (as contributor)
- 2023: Sounding Heaven and Earth: A Poet’s Corner Collection (Canterbury Press Norwich) ISBN 9781786225399

=== Fiction ===
- 2022: The Lost Tales of Sir Galahad (Rabbit Room Press) ISBN 9781951872106 (as contributor)

== See also ==
- Metaphysical poets
