= Hollywood Walk of Fame =

Sidewalk attraction in Los Angeles, California

- The official logo for the Walk of Fame as published by the Hollywood Chamber of Commerce

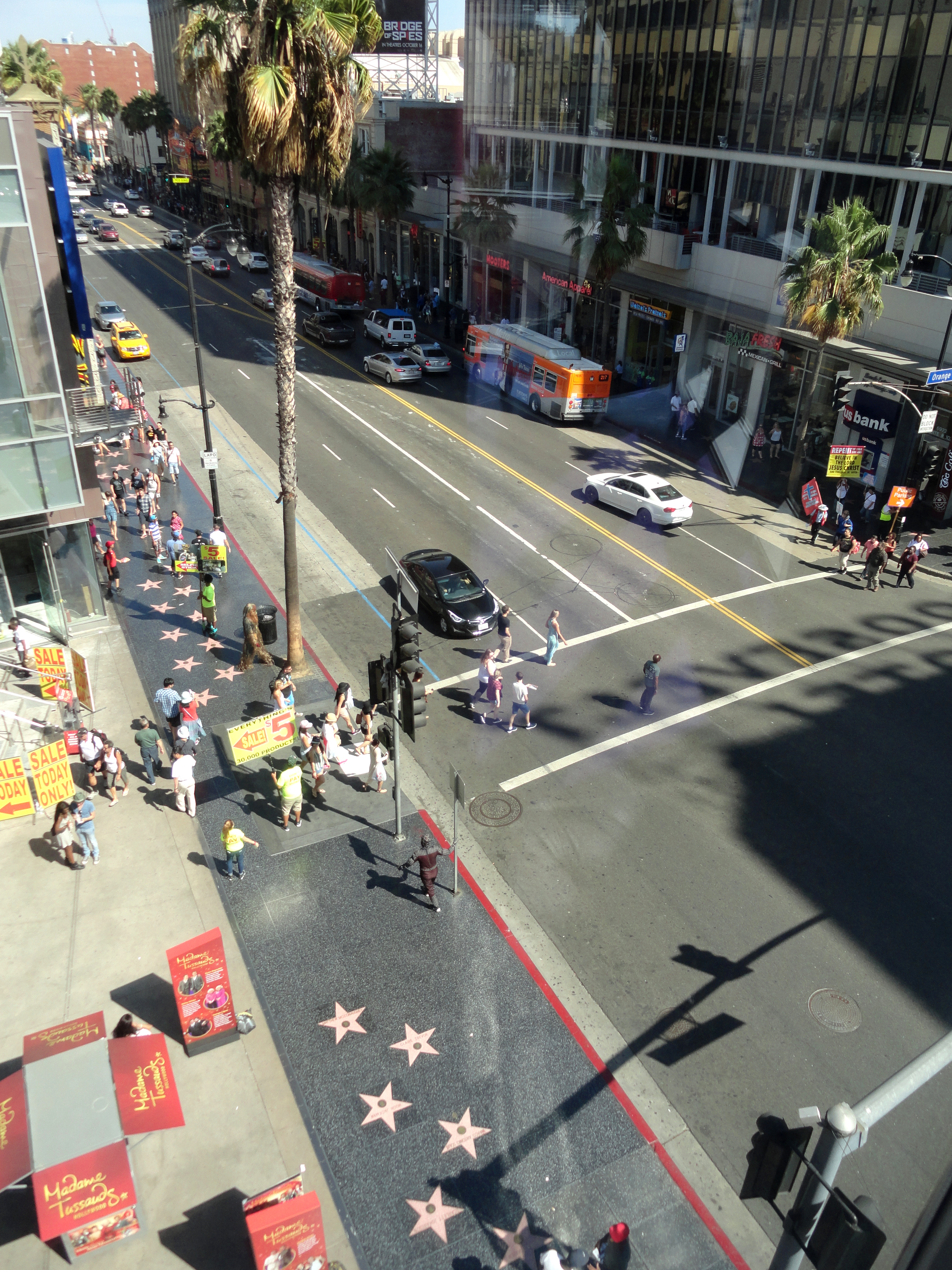
- The Walk of Fame at Hollywood Boulevard and Orange Drive, 2015
- Location in Los Angeles
- Established: February 8, 1960; 66 years ago
- Location: 6100–7100 Hollywood Boulevard and 1500–1800 Vine Street in Hollywood, Los Angeles
- Coordinates: 34.1016°N 118.3267°W
- Type: Entertainment hall of fame
- Visitors: about 10 million annually
- Public transit access: Hollywood/Vine; Hollywood/Highland
- Website: walkoffame.com

Los Angeles Historic-Cultural Monument
- Designated: July 5, 1978
- Reference no.: 194

The Hollywood Walk of Fame is a landmark with more than 2,800 five-pointed terrazzo-and-brass stars embedded in the sidewalks along fifteen blocks of Hollywood Boulevard and three blocks of Vine Street in the Hollywood district of Los Angeles, California, United States. The stars are monuments to achievement in the entertainment industry and bear the names of a mix of actors, filmmakers, musicians, inventors, businessmen, fictional characters, and more. Many individuals have been honored more than once.

The Walk of Fame was originally conceived in 1953. The first stars were unveiled in 1958, and the first permanent stars were placed in 1960. The Walk has been expanded on multiple fronts since then, including in the number of stars displayed; categories, entities, and organizations honored; and blocks covered. The Walk also deteriorated while it expanded, and a long-term restoration plan began in 2007.

The Walk of Fame is administered by the Hollywood Chamber of Commerce and maintained by the self-financing Hollywood Historic Trust. The Chamber evaluates nominations through a selection committee and upon acceptance, it collects fees from the new honoree's sponsor to fund the creation and installation of their star as well as maintenance for the entire Walk. The Chamber also owns the Walk's licensing rights.

The Walk of Fame is one of Los Angeles's most popular tourist attractions, receiving an estimated ten million annual visitors in 2010. Attendance at new star unveilings can reach into the thousands, and the Walk is also a popular site for street performers, tributes, and protests. Some of the Walk's entries are controversial, as is its overall state, which leaves many disappointed and has earned it several pejoratives. Despite this, the Walk has inspired other walks around the world.

== Description ==
The Walk of Fame spans 1.3 miles (2.1 km) on Hollywood Boulevard between Gower Street and La Brea Avenue, and 0.4 miles (0.64 km) on Vine Street between Yucca Street and Sunset Boulevard.

A star in the motion pictures category

As of September 2026, the Walk consists of 2,857 stars, all but one of which are placed in the ground, and all but the Awards of Excellence are set into the sidewalk at 6-foot (1.8 m) intervals. The stars are five-point, coral-pink terrazzo rimmed with brass and inlaid into a 3-by-3-foot (0.91 by 0.91 m) charcoal-colored terrazzo background. Inside the stars, honorees' names are embedded with center-arranged 2-inch (5.1 cm) brass letters in one or two rows, and below each name is a circular 6-inch (15 cm) brass emblem that corresponds with the category the honoree is honored in. Stars face differing directions so that pedestrians can see them easily from whichever direction they are walking. The Walk also contains hundreds of blank stars, each serving as a placeholder for a future honoree.

=== Categorization ===
Stars on the Walk of Fame are awarded in six categories: motion pictures, television, recording, radio, live theater/performance, and sports entertainment. (Note: Recording is sometimes referred to as music.) Their emblems are:

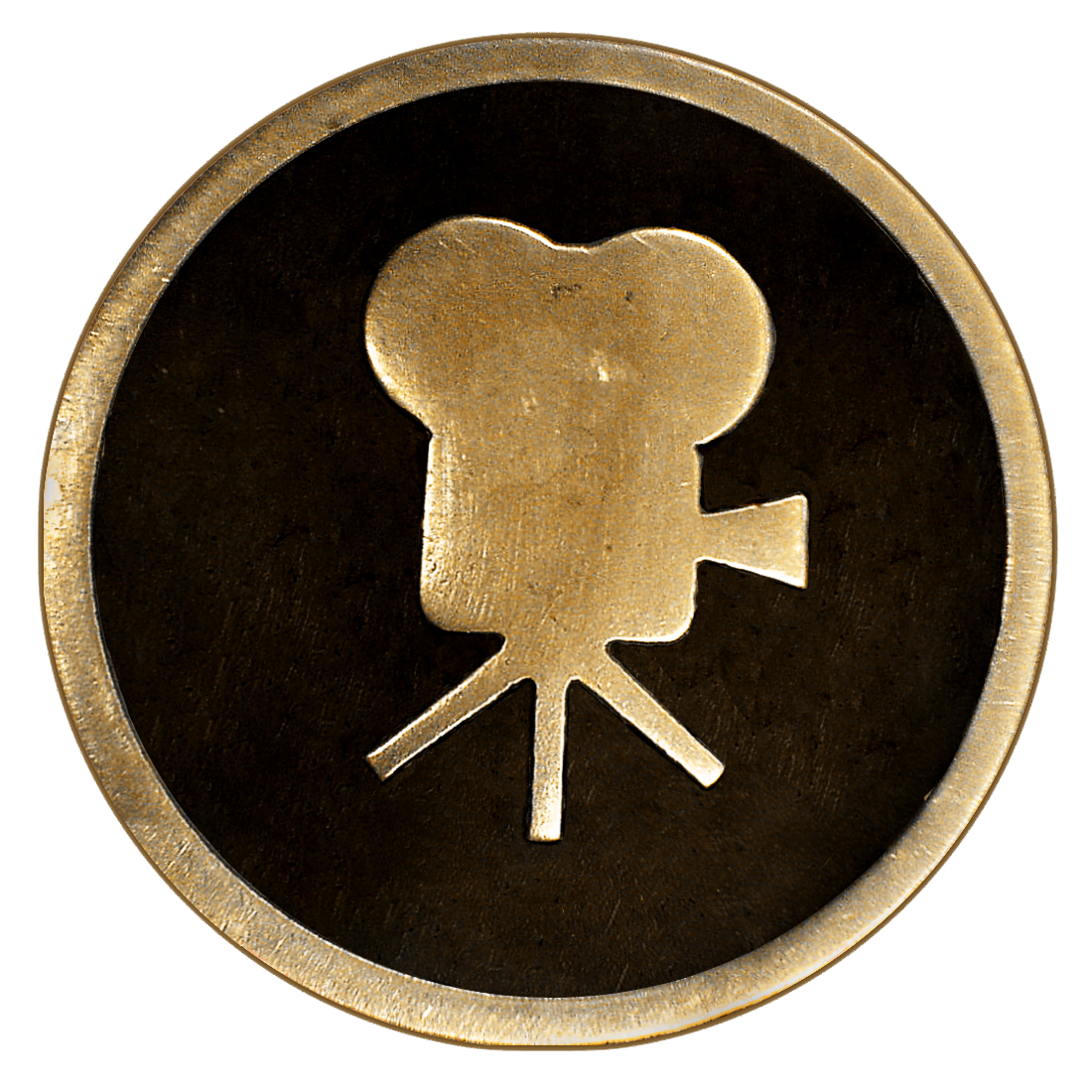
- Classic film camera, representing motion pictures
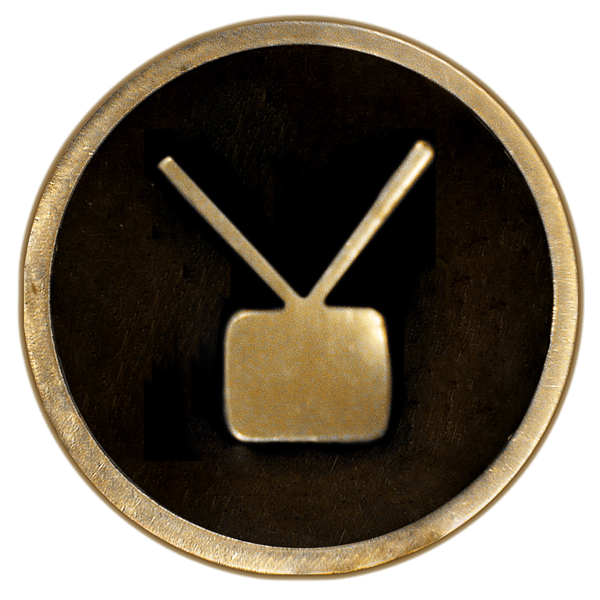
- Television, representing television
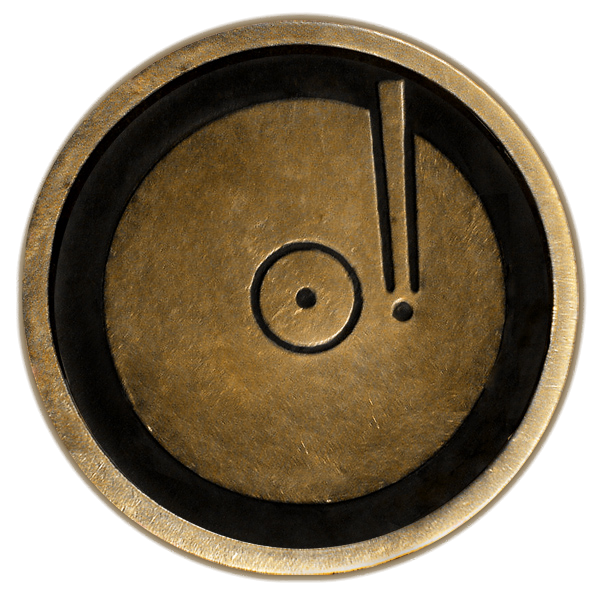
- Phonograph record, representing recording
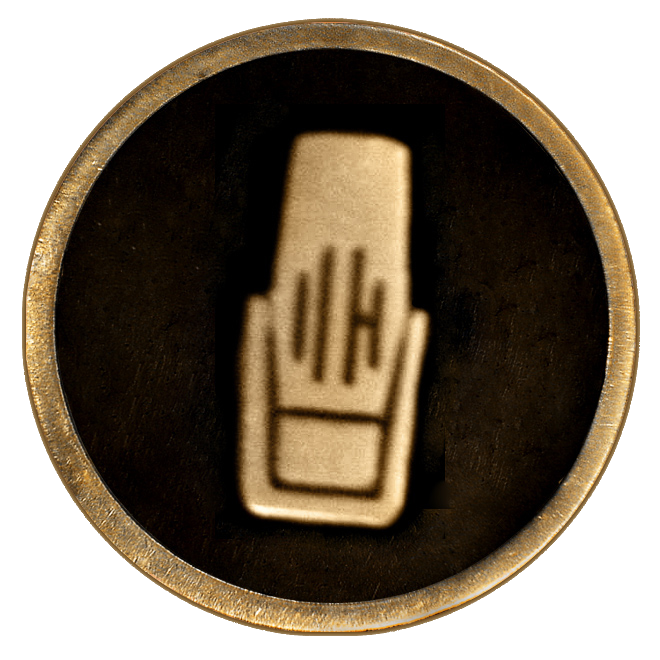
- Radio microphone, representing radio
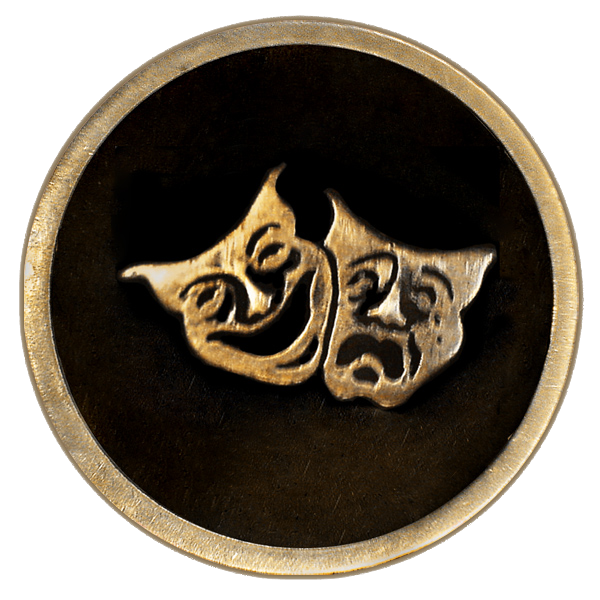
- Comedy/tragedy masks, representing live theater/performance
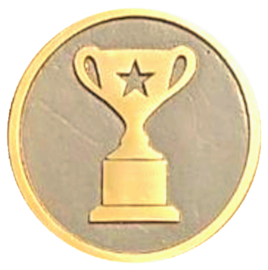
- Athletic trophy, representing sports entertainment

A seventh special category exists for the Hollywood Chamber of Commerce to directly honor organizations, corporations, and more. These entries, known as Awards of Excellence, do not feature the category emblems and their text is in a different font.

The categories are not represented equally. As of October 2025, 44% of all stars were in the motion pictures category, 25% in television, 19% in recording, 9% in radio, fewer than 3% in live theater/performance, and fewer than 1% in sports entertainment and Awards of Excellence combined. (Note: As of October 16, 2025, the star breakdown was: 1,226 in motion pictures, 704 in television, 529 in audio recording or music, 254 in radio, 75 in live theater/performance, 3 in sports entertainment, and 22 Awards of Excellence.)

=== Alternative designs ===
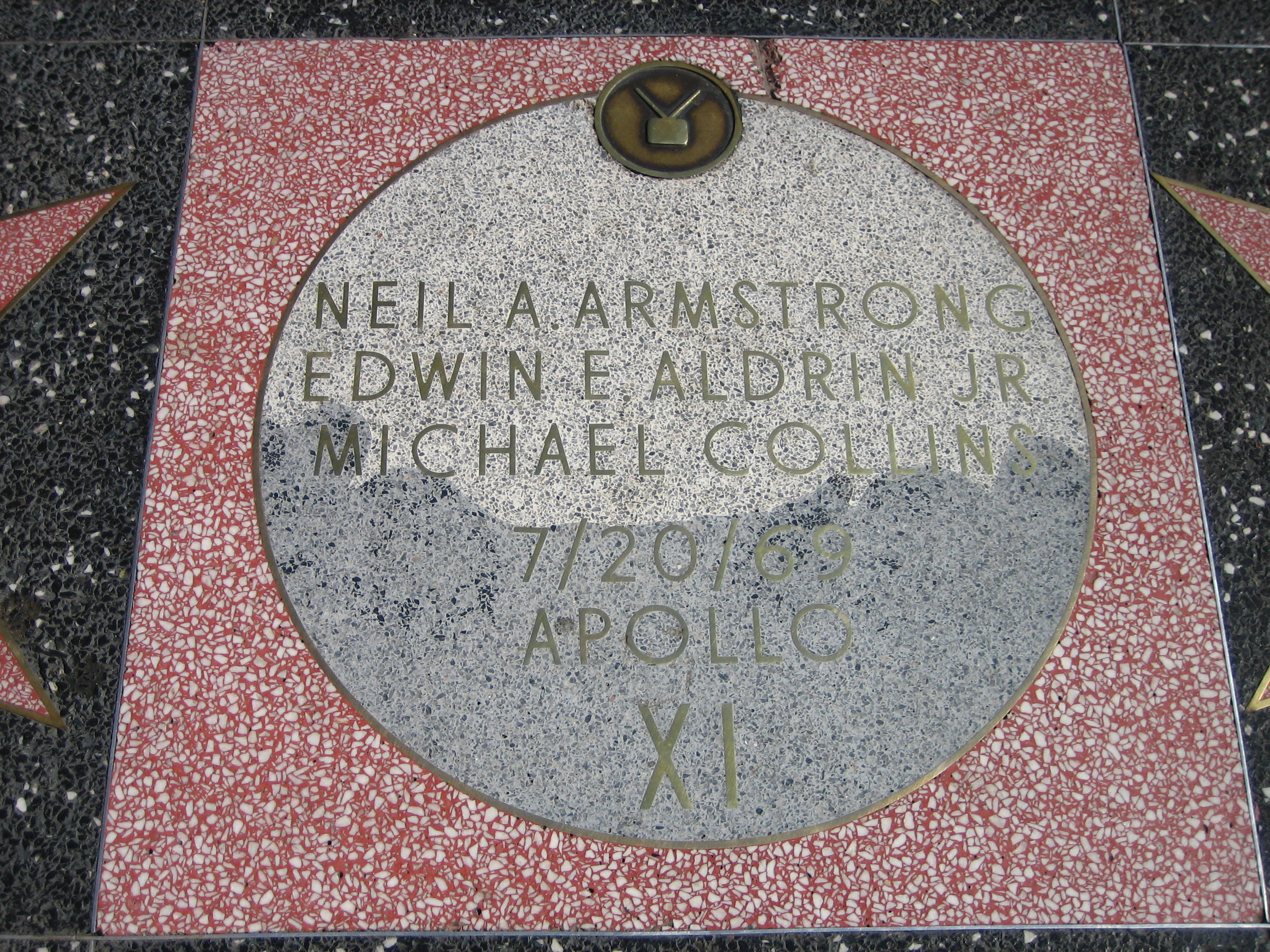
One of four monuments recognizing the Apollo 11 astronauts

Awards of Excellence do not use the same font or display the same emblems as the rest of the Walk. Johnny Grant's Award of Excellence emblem, for example, displays the seal of Hollywood, and the emblem on the L.A.P.D. Hollywood star displays a Hollywood Division badge. Furthermore, Awards of Excellence for Walk of Fame sponsors Absolut, L'Oréal, and Princess Cruises and The Love Boat contain "mini stars".

The Walk's Apollo 11 entries are circular and meant to resemble the Moon. They also display the date of the Moon landing, "Apollo XI", and their color scheme is silver and grey on a pink background. The Walk contains four of these entries, one on each corner of Hollywood and Vine.

=== Star locations ===
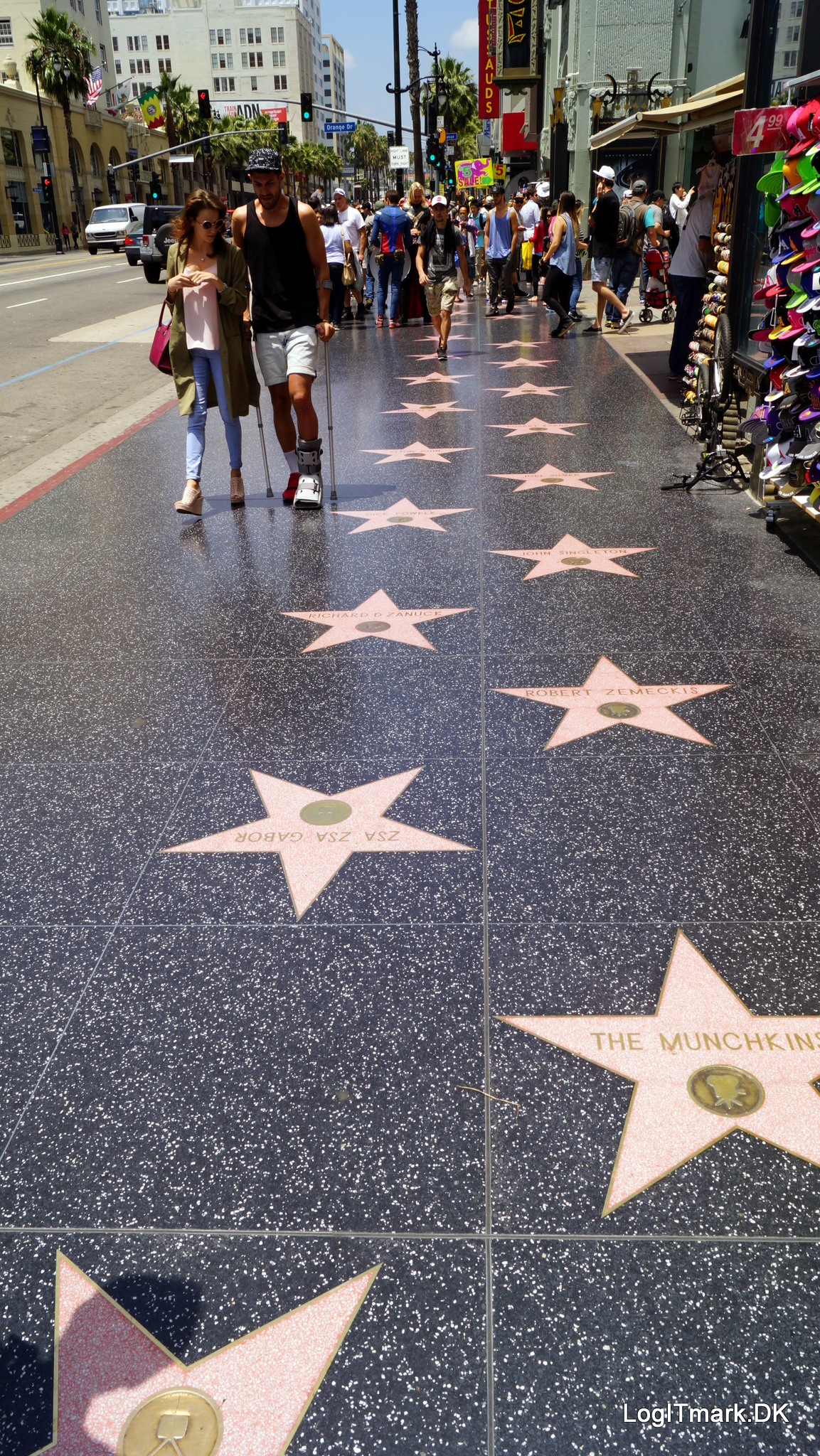
Stars outside Grauman's Chinese Theatre

The blocks outside Grauman's Chinese Theatre and Hollywood Roosevelt Hotel are considered the prime locations for stars. Stars of particularly well-known celebrities are often placed in front of the Chinese, Oscar winners' stars near Dolby Theatre, Disney characters outside El Capitan Theatre, rock 'n' rollers outside the Musicians Institute, and other musicians outside the Capitol Records Building. Family members and co-stars are often placed together.

Hollywood Chamber of Commerce producer Ana Martinez has decided star locations since c. 1987 (Note: She was reported to have been in charge for 25 years as of 2012 and 35 years as of 2023.) and tries to choose somewhere connected to the honoree. For example, John Waters and Ray Bradbury's stars were placed outside Larry Edmunds Bookshop, a business the former has said he loved and the latter had patronized for fifty years; Tim Burton's star was placed outside Hollywood Toys & Costumes, a business he credits as one of his childhood inspirations; and Farrah Fawcett's star was placed outside a hair salon, as she was known for her hair. Some stars were placed in locations connected to the honoree before Martinez was in charge as well, for example Alfred Hitchcock's star was placed outside Fox Hollywood, a theater that was showing his film Psycho at the time of the unveiling.

For actors, stars are sometimes placed in locations connected to a role they are known for. Examples include Austin Powers actor Mike Myers, whose star was placed outside an adult store called the International Love Boutique; James Bond 007 actors Roger Moore and Daniel Craig, whose stars are located at 7007 Hollywood Boulevard; 24 star Kiefer Sutherland, whose star is located at 7024 Hollywood Boulevard; Ed O'Neill, whose star was placed outside a shoe store in reference to his character's occupation on Married... with Children; and Steve Guttenberg, whose star was placed outside the Police Activities League in reference to his role in the Police Academy franchise.

Honorees may work with the Chamber to find a location for their star. Those whose stars were placed at a requested location include Jay Leno, who requested a spot near Hollywood and Highland because twenty years prior he had been arrested for vagrancy there twice; George Carlin, who requested his star be placed in front of KDAY radio station, where he was previously employed; Ed McMahon, who requested his star be next to W. C. Fields's; and Carol Burnett, who requested her star be placed outside Warner Brothers Theatre, where she had worked as an usherette and was fired for insisting a couple arriving during the final few minutes of a screening wait for the next screening. The Chamber typically does not accommodate requests for spots outside the Chinese Theatre, as that area is reserved for "show-biz royalty", however, when Michael Jackson refused to attend his unveiling unless his star was located in front of the Chinese, the Chamber acquiesced to his demand.

Awards of Excellence are not located on the Walk, as many feature commercial names, which are banned on sidewalks in Los Angeles. Instead, these entries are located on private property next to the Walk, sometimes just inches away.

=== Other elements ===
Hollywood and La Brea Gateway, also known as the Four Ladies of Hollywood

In addition to stars, the Walk consists of several other elements. Hollywood and La Brea Gateway, also known as Four Ladies of Hollywood, is a gazebo located on a traffic island at Hollywood Boulevard and La Brea Avenue that serves as a gateway to the Walk. Created in 1993 and dedicated on February 1, 1994, the structure was designed by Catherine Hardwicke and consists of a square stainless steel Art Deco-style open roof held up by life-size caryatids of Dorothy Dandridge, Anna May Wong, Dolores del Río, and Mae West, each standing on a square base and wearing a glamorous gown. The gazebo's roof is rounded and supports a circular dome, the dome topped by a central spire with descending neon block letters spelling "Hollywood" on each side. Atop the spire is a small gilded weather vane-style sculpture of Marilyn Monroe in her billowing skirt pose from The Seven Year Itch. Critics have described the gazebo as "depressingly awful" and "creative and wonderful."

The Hollywood Walk of Fame Mural is a 100-foot (30 m) mixed-media mural made to celebrate the Walk's 60th anniversary and the Chamber's 100th. The mural is meant to tell "a comprehensive story of the history of Walk of Fame from its creation to its persistence..." and also "captur[e] the ages, the diversity and the beauty of the Walk of Fame and its recipients..." It was created by Ian Robertson-Salt, curated by Art Share LA, and unveiled on June 11, 2021.

A time capsule commemorating the Walk's 50th anniversary was buried below a specially-designed star near Hollywood and Highland in 2010. The capsule contains more than fifty items, including a signed picture of Joanne Woodward, a piece of Elvis Presley's star, a replica of the Capitol Records building, Emmy award memorabilia, an assortment of DVDs, the script for Casablanca, playbills from The Pantages, news articles about the Walk of Fame, and a note from Bob Barker. The capsule is scheduled to be opened in 2060.

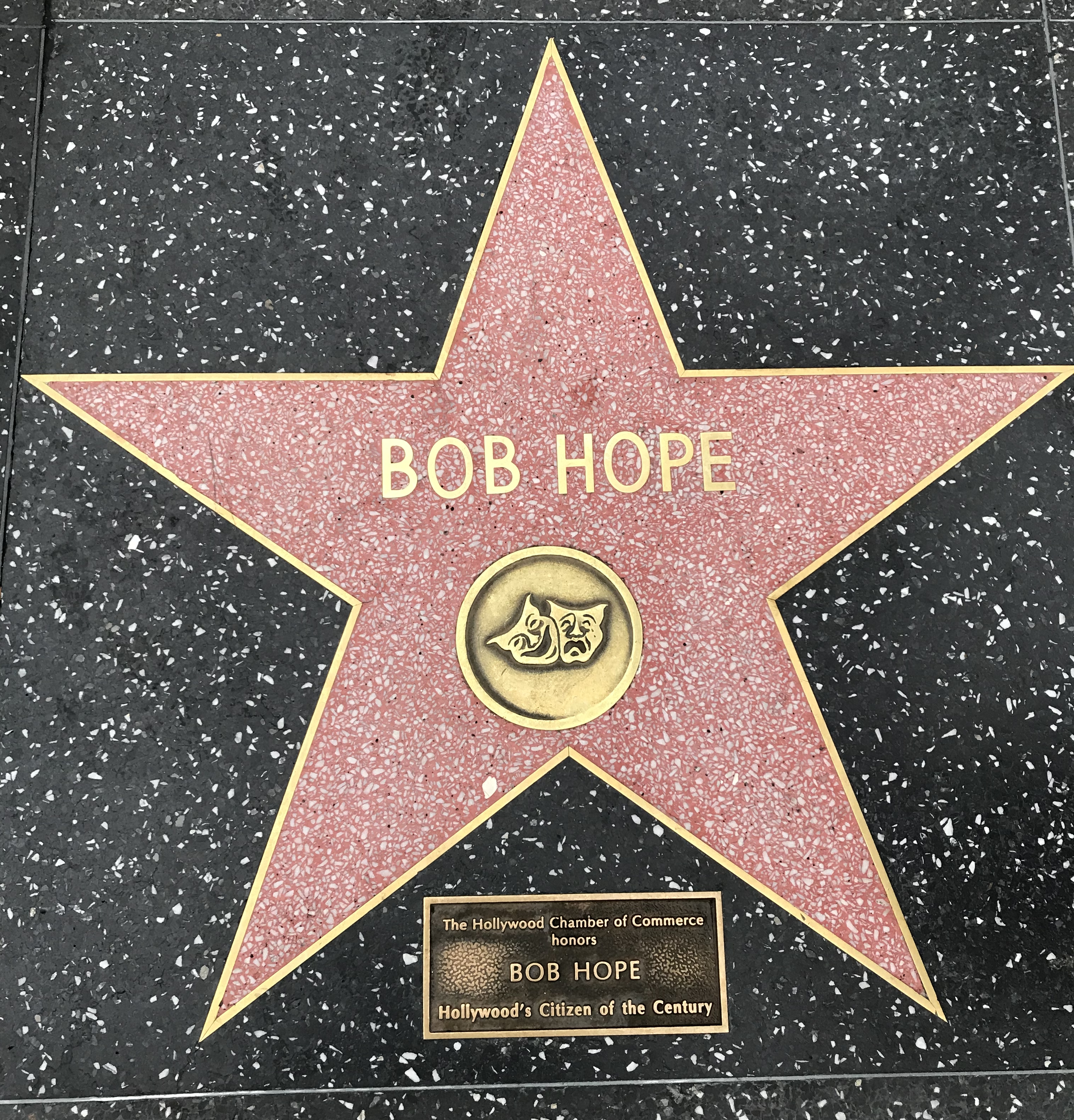
Bob Hope's live performance star with a plaque honoring him as Hollywood's Citizen of the Century

Some stars are accompanied by plaques about the star or its recipient. For example, a plaque beside Bob Hope's live performance star honors him as Hollywood's Citizen of the Century, a designation he was given when the star was re-dedicated for his 100th birthday; a plaque beside Gene Autry's live performance star, his fifth star awarded, notes that he is the only individual honored in all (at the time) five categories; and a plaque beside Jennifer Lopez's star recognizes it as the 2,500th star unveiled. Additionally, stars unveiled in 2010 are accompanied by a 50th anniversary plaque.

Walk of Fame honorees also receive a replica plaque for their personal ownership.

== Administration ==
The Hollywood Chamber of Commerce administers the Walk of Fame, which is maintained by the self-financing Hollywood Historic Trust. The Chamber collects fees ($85,000 as of 2026) from each new honoree's sponsor; these funds are used to create and install the honoree's star, create a replica plaque for the honoree, host an unveiling ceremony, and maintain the entire Walk. The Chamber also owns the Walk's licensing rights, which they have upheld through cease and desist orders and lawsuits. These licensing rights earned the Chamber an estimated $500,000 from souvenirs in 2012 ($701,189 in 2025).

=== Nominations ===
In 1962, the City of Los Angeles specified the Hollywood Chamber of Commerce as the organization to advise them about new entries to the Walk. The Chamber does so through a selection committee that receives between 200 and 300 nominations per year. Anyone, including fans, can nominate anyone other than themselves as long as the nominee approves. A minimum of five years' experience in the nominated category is required and posthumous nominees must have been deceased for at least two years; posthumous nominees also require the approval of the nominee's family or estate. The nomination fee was $275 as of 2026.

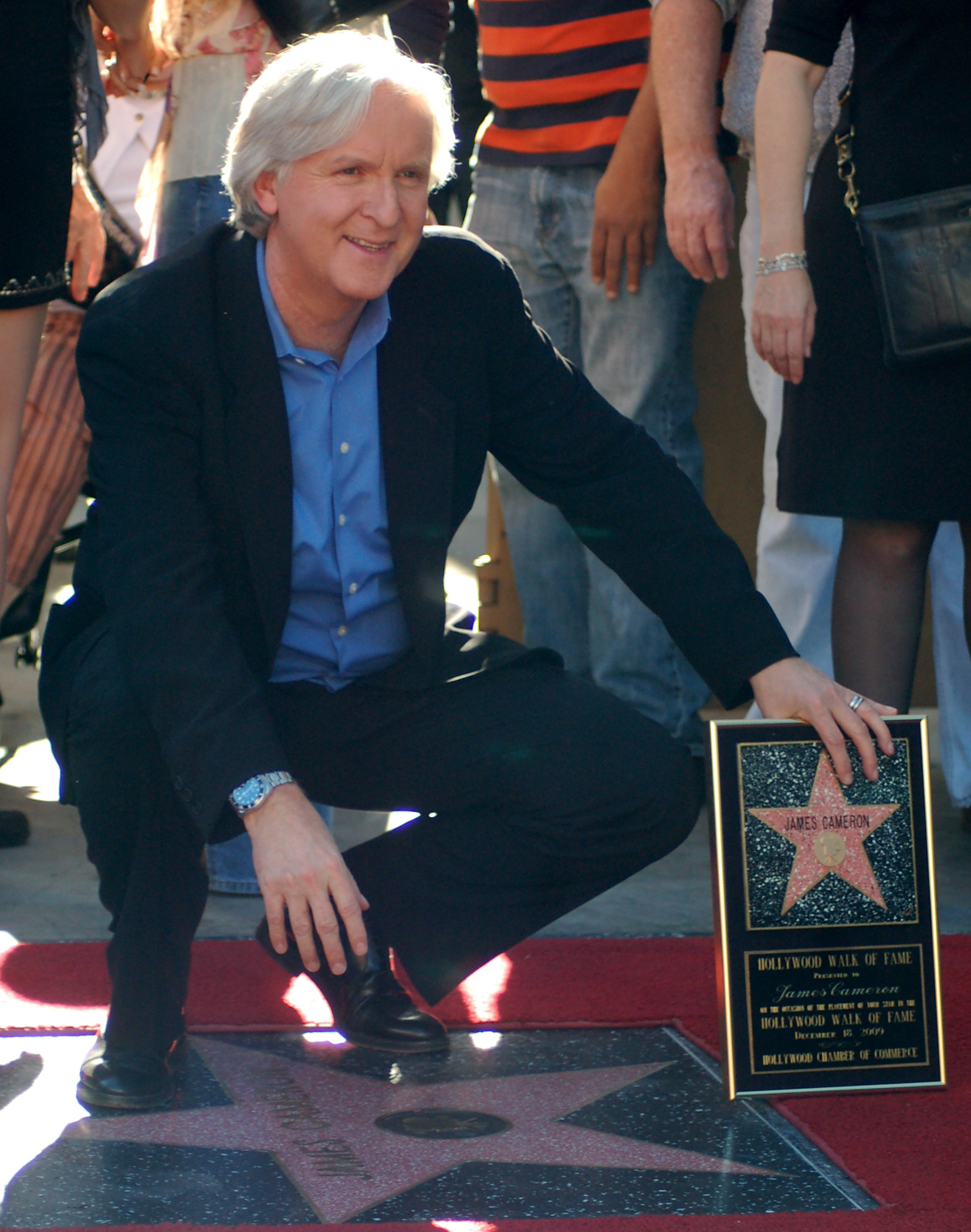
James Cameron unveiling his star in 2009

Nominees are evaluated based on professional achievement (including awards and other honors), charitable contributions, and longevity. The selection process begins in April, and by June, approximately thirty nominations are selected. All selections must be signed off by Los Angeles City Council and the Board of Public Works, and once selected, honorees must schedule a ceremony within two years or their nomination is rejected.

Traditionally, selection committee members other than chairman are not made public. However, in 1999, in response to intensifying charges of secrecy in the selection process, the Chamber disclosed its committee members; they were: Johnny Grant, committee chair; Earl Lestz, president of Paramount Studio Group; Stan Spero, retired manager at KMPC and KABC; Kate Nelson, owner of Palace Theatre; and Mary Lou Dudas, vice president of A&M Records. As of 2018, committee members were allowed to serve a maximum of four years.

Johnny Grant remained committee chair until his death in January 2008 and by September, Lestz was chair. By 2010, former Director of Communications for the Academy of Motion Picture Arts and Sciences John Pavlik was chairman, while David Green was chair in 2012 and 2013, Maureen Schultz in 2014, Vin Di Bona in 2016 through 2019, Ellen K in 2020 through 2023, and Peter Roth in 2024 and 2025. Kristin Chenoweth and LL Cool J were reported to be committee members in 2018, and the Chamber's current position is that "each of the six categories is represented by Walk of Famers with expertise in that field."

=== Rule adjustments ===
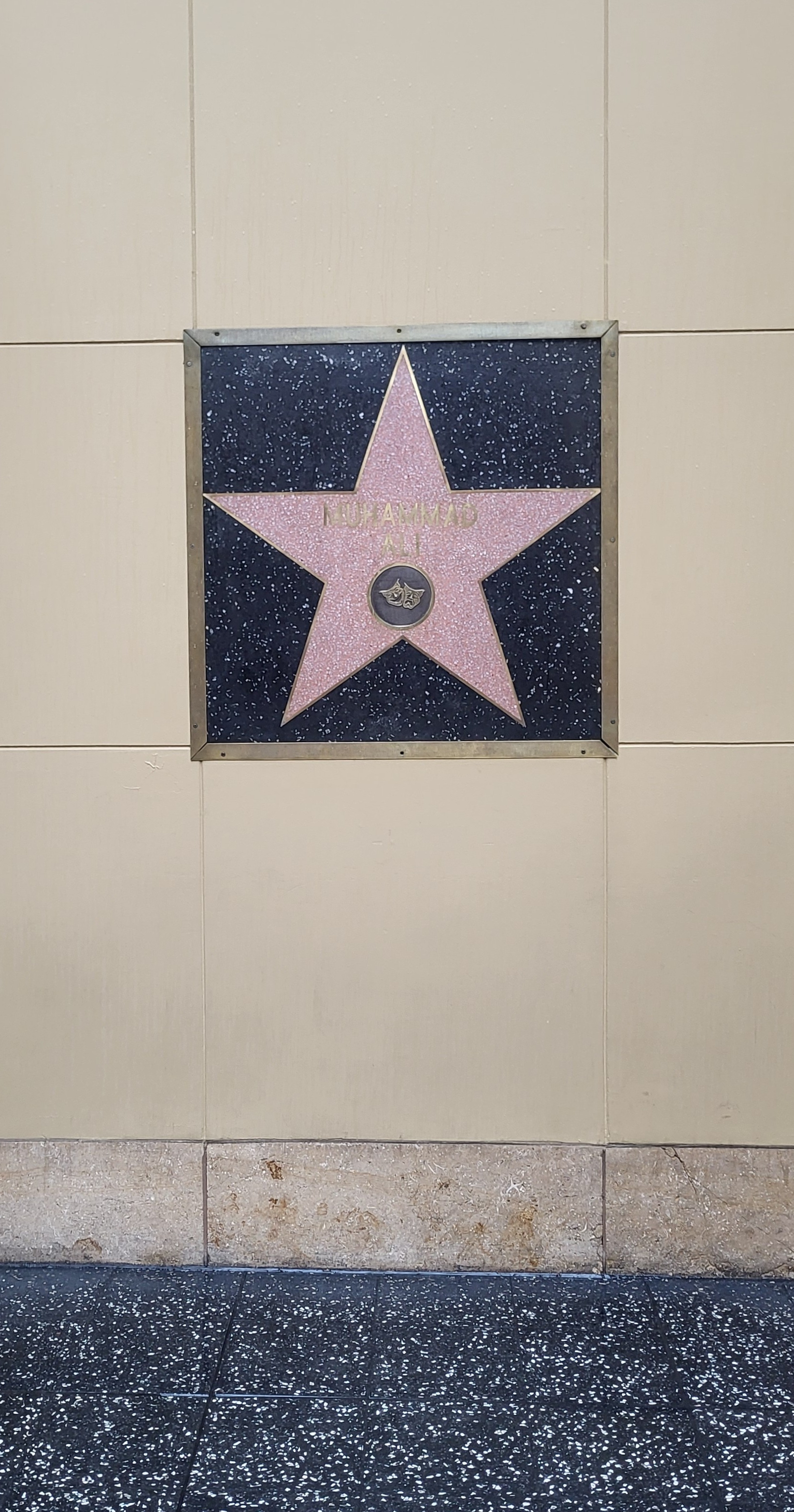
Muhammad Ali's star in the live performance category, placed vertically in a wall so it cannot be walked upon

Rules prohibit nominees whose contributions lie outside the categories the Walk of Fame honors, but the Selection Committee has adjusted interpretations of its categories to justify selections. For example, the Apollo 11 monuments officially recognize the astronauts for "contributions to the television industry", something that committee chairman Johnny Grant acknowledged was "a bit of a stretch." Another example is Muhammad Ali, whose star was granted after the committee decided boxing was a form of live performance; Ali's star was also placed vertically in a wall instead of horizontally in the sidewalk because Ali shares his name with the Islamic prophet Muhammad and therefore requested it not be walked upon.

Only one honoree has had their star unveiled after failing to attend the required unveiling: Barbra Streisand. Streisand did attend when her husband James Brolin was honored two decades later.

=== Upkeep ===
According to local law, the City of Los Angeles bears no responsibility for the maintenance of sidewalks, including those of the Hollywood Walk of Fame. Instead, the responsibility lies with property owners, or in the case of the Walk of Fame, a property owners' association. As such, maintenance for the Walk of Fame is paid for by the Hollywood Chamber of Commerce, funded by half of the fee for each new star. However, these funds are not used exclusively for cleaning and repairs; for example, they also pay for streetscape holiday lighting.

As of 2016, the cost of a complete star restoration was between $5,000 and $10,000 ($6,700 and $13,400 in 2025). The Chamber often waits for private developers to pay for this, as it is usually included in neighboring construction projects. The Chamber also prioritizes repairing serious damage, such as trip-and-fall hazards, over cosmetic repairs.

The Star Polishers, a group of volunteers who shined the Walk's stars, was formed c. 1980 (Note: The group was formed about 15 years before 1995.) and the group reached 140 members by 1995. Also in 1995, the City of Los Angeles cleaned the Walk nightly via high-powered hot water washing; this cleaning, however, did not polish or shine the stars. In 1999, the Hollywood Business Improvement District hired homeless, one-legged, former television repairman John Peterson to polish every star at least once a month; previously, he had been doing so of his own initiative. Peterson retired in 2014, after which his position was filled by a rotating crew of contractors, and as of 2019, Walk of Fame cleaning procedures included daily sweeping and bi-weekly power washing in addition to once-a-month polishing. Cleaning is generally done around midnight, when the sidewalks are less busy.

=== Star removal ===
The idea of removing stars was broached as early as 1958; however, no star has ever been removed from the Walk. In answer to various requests, the Chamber announced in 2017 that "the Hollywood Walk of Fame is a registered historic landmark. Once a star has been added ... it is considered a part of the historic fabric" (Note: The Walk is a Los Angeles Historic-Cultural Monument and although it is not registered in the National Register of Historic Places, it is mentioned as an element of "fine urban design" in the Hollywood Boulevard Commercial and Entertainment District's listing.) and will not be removed. The following year Chamber president Leron Gubler stated “we view [the Walk of Fame] as part of history, and we don’t erase history.” The Chamber further clarified its position in 2024, stating that it does not have the authority to remove stars.

== History ==
=== Origin ===
The Walk of Fame was conceived in response to the significant revenue drops Hollywood was experiencing in the late 1940s and early 1950s, caused by suburbanization and the Paramount Decree. It was created to honor figures in the entertainment industry, engage tourists, and improve Hollywood's streets.

Some sources give Hollywood Chamber of Commerce member and Hollywood Improvement Association president Harry Sugarman credit for coming up with the idea of the Walk, while the Chamber itself credits 1953 volunteer president E. M. Stuart and also states that the Hollywood Improvement Association was established with Sugarman as president to see the project through to completion. The origin of the star concept is also uncertain, although it may have come from stars that displayed celebrity names on Hollywood Hotel's dining room ceiling; another theory has it coming from Sugarman's Tropics, a restaurant whose drink menu featured celebrity photos framed in gold stars. Regardless, by 1955, the basic idea had been agreed upon; it was submitted to City Council in January 1956.

Between May 1956 and fall 1957, 1,558 honorees were selected by committees representing four branches of the entertainment industry: motion pictures, television, recording, and radio. Committee members included Cecil B. DeMille, Samuel Goldwyn, Jesse L. Lasky, Walt Disney, Hal Roach, Mack Sennett, and Walter Lantz. The recording committee originally required minimum sales of one million records or 250,000 albums, but they soon realized many important artists would be excluded by this requirement. As a result, the National Academy of Recording Arts and Sciences was formed to create a separate award for the music industry, leading to the first Grammy Awards in 1959.

In February 1956, a prototype was unveiled featuring John Wayne's name and caricature inside a star; caricatures, however, proved too difficult to execute and were replaced by brass emblems. The Walk's proposal also originally called for a blue and brown sidewalk, but this was vetoed by Charles E. Toberman, reportedly because it clashed with a building he had under construction. The final design, including a coral-and-charcoal color scheme, was then approved, and in September 1958, eight prototype stars were installed on the northwest corner of Hollywood and Highland, their purpose to generate publicity, gauge public interest, and demonstrate how the Walk would look. The eight honored, chosen at random, were Olive Borden, Ronald Colman, Louise Fazenda, Preston Foster, Burt Lancaster, Edward Sedgwick, Ernest Torrence, and Joanne Woodward. Of these eight, Joanne Woodward is often singled out as the first honoree because she was the first to pose with her star for photographs.

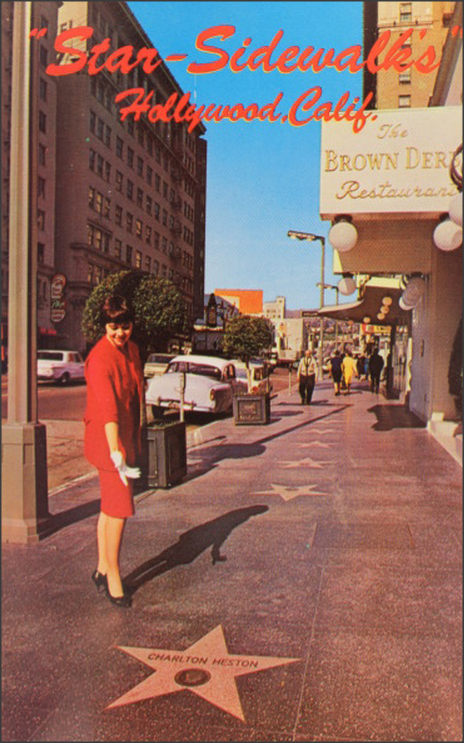
Vine Street near Hollywood and Vine in the 1960s

Construction of the Walk was scheduled to begin in 1958, but two lawsuits delayed it. The first was filed by local property owners challenging the $85 per foot of storefront, $1.25 million ($13.9 million in 2025) in total, tax assessment levied upon them. In 1959, the assessment was ruled legal. The second was filed by Charles Chaplin Jr., who sought $400,000 ($4.46 million in 2025) in damages for the exclusion of his father, whose inclusion had been withdrawn due to pressure from local business owners. Chaplin Jr.'s suit was dismissed in 1960, allowing for construction to begin.

The Walk's official groundbreaking took place on February 8, 1960, and was attended by Chamber members Stuart and Sugarman, Los Angeles County Board of Supervisors member Ernest E. Debs, and future honorees Linda Darnell, Gigi Perreau, Francis X. Bushman, and Charles Coburn. On March 28, 1960, the first permanent star, Stanley Kramer's, was set near Hollywood and Gower. In total, 1,558 names were set for honorees, as were about 500 blank stars meant to acknowledge the Walk as a living monument. The Walk was dedicated on November 23, 1960, and completed the following spring.

=== Stagnation and revitalization ===
The 1960s and 1970s saw protracted urban decay in Hollywood. After the Walk's initial installation, eight years passed without the addition of a new star. In 1962, the Los Angeles City Council passed an ordinance naming the Hollywood Chamber of Commerce the agent to advise the City regarding new honorees. The Chamber then devised rules, procedures, and financing methods to do so. In December 1968, Richard D. Zanuck was awarded the Walk's first new star and by May 1975, 99 stars had been added. The 1970s also saw the Chamber switch from anointing honorees to requiring nominations.

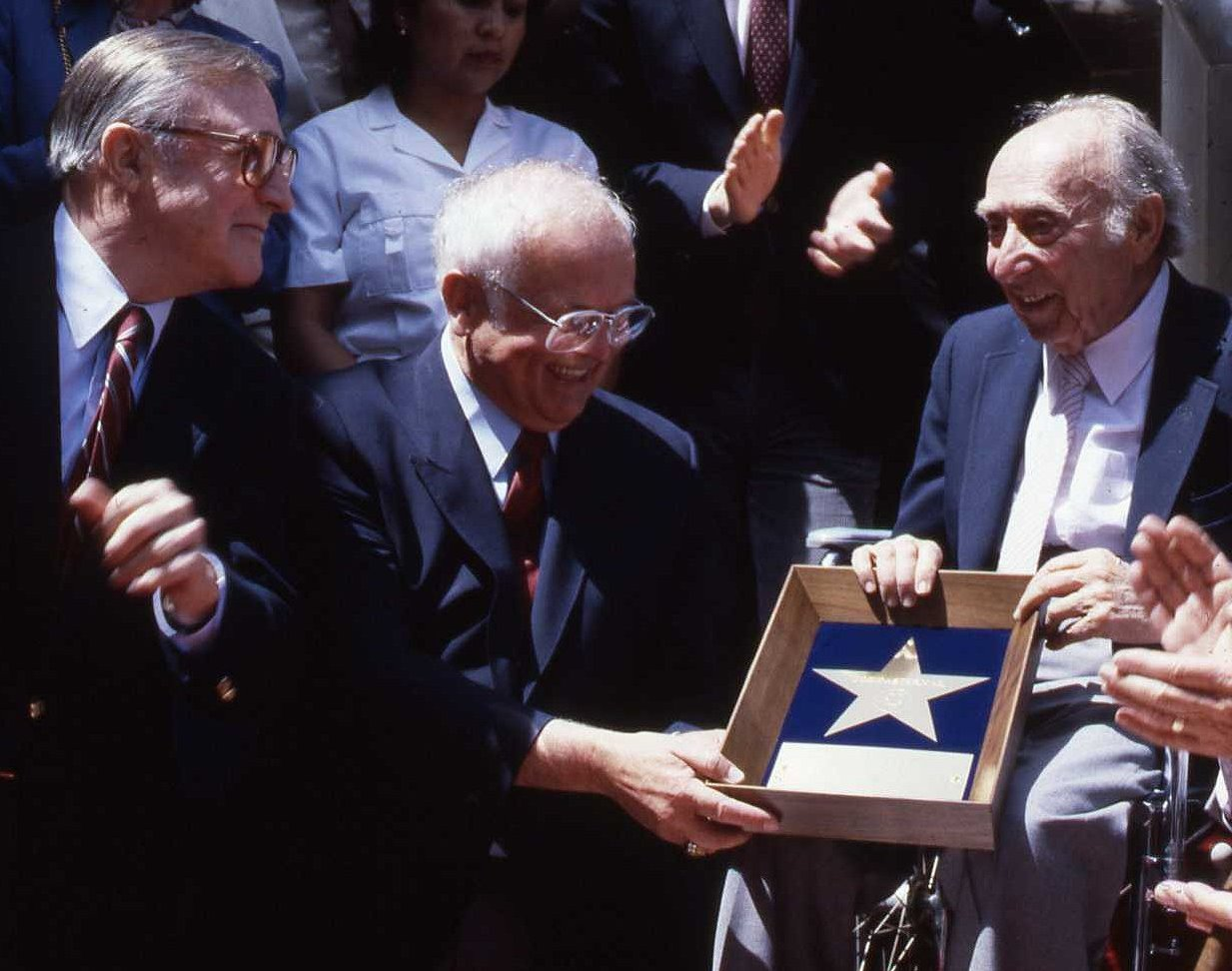
Johnny Grant, center, at Joe Pasternak's star unveiling, 1991

In 1980, Johnny Grant was awarded a star for his television work, for which he took it upon himself to create a memorable ceremony. Impressed by his efforts, the Chamber and Grant agreed that he become Walk of Fame Committee chairman and that in this position he help resurrect the Walk. Grant stimulated the Walk's publicity by requiring each new recipient to personally attend their star unveiling; he later recalled that "it was tough to get people to come accept a star" due to the state of the neighborhood at the time. Grant also transformed the unveilings into media events commonly aired on nightly newscasts, and he instituted a $2,500 ($9,769 in 2025) fee for each new star, to fund the Walk's upkeep. The fee has increased over time and was $85,000 as of 2026.

In 2002, Grant received an Award of Excellence star to acknowledge his efforts to revitalize the neighborhood. He was also named chairman of the Selection Committee and Honorary Mayor of Hollywood, the latter a ceremonial position previously held by Art Linkletter and Monty Hall, amongst others. Grant held these positions until his death in 2008, by which point he had hosted more than 500 star unveilings and his name was considered synonymous with the Walk. After Grant's death, representative Diane Watson stated that "no name [is] more associated with Hollywood’s Walk of Fame than Johnny Grant" and today, the Chamber credits Grant's leadership with having "built the Walk into an international icon."

=== Preservation and expansion ===
The Hollywood Walk of Fame was designated Los Angeles Historic-Cultural Monument No. 194 on July 5, 1978. In 1985, the Hollywood Boulevard Commercial and Entertainment District was added to the National Register of Historic Places, and while the Walk was not included in the listing, it was mentioned as an element of "fine urban design".

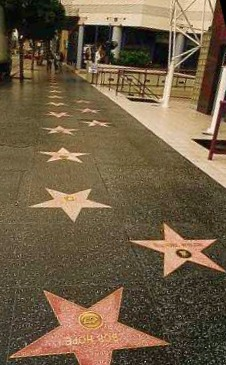
The Walk with two rows of alternating stars

In 1984, a fifth category, Live Theatre, was added to acknowledge contributions from the live performance branch of the entertainment industry. In the 1990s, a second row of stars was created to alternate with stars from the first row. In 1994, the Walk was extended one block west, to the Hollywood and La Brea Gateway gazebo, which was added that same year; 33 honorees were anointed outside the Walk's normal nomination process during this expansion. Also in 1994, during construction of the B Line, the Metropolitan Transportation Authority (MTA) removed and stored more than 200 stars. Controversy arose three years later, when the MTA proposed destroying the terrazzo pads of 122 additional stars while preserving only the brass lettering, surrounds, and medallions, then replacing the terrazzo after construction was complete, but the Cultural Heritage Commission ruled that the stars and their terrazzo pads needed to be removed intact.

The Walk celebrated its 50th anniversary in 2010. Each star unveiled that year was accompanied by a 50th anniversary plaque and a time capsule was also added under its own star. Additionally, on July 25, 2010, the neighborhood held an anniversary festival that included live music, studio and theater tours, and an exhibit at the Hollywood Museum. The U.S. House of Representatives also officially commended and congratulated the Walk that year.

In 2023, a sixth category, Sports Entertainment, was added to acknowledge contributions of athletes to the entertainment industry. About 24 stars were added per year in all categories combined as of 2020; since then, more than 30 honorees have been selected every year but 2023.

=== Restoration ===
In 2007, the Los Angeles Metropolitan Transit Authority began a year-long study to determine the best way to stabilize the buckling that was damaging the Walk's stars and terrazzo. The following year, all 2,365 stars were evaluated, each of which received an A, B, C, D, or F; 10 received Fs, 50 received Ds, and 778 (33% of all stars) were identified for replacement, as were 2,155 blank squares. The estimated cost for these replacements was $4.1 million ($6.13 million in 2025); however, this proved to be a severe underestimate. A two-year timeframe for the project was also an underestimate; star replacements did not begin until 2012 and four years later, 20% of the Walk's stars remained in disrepair.

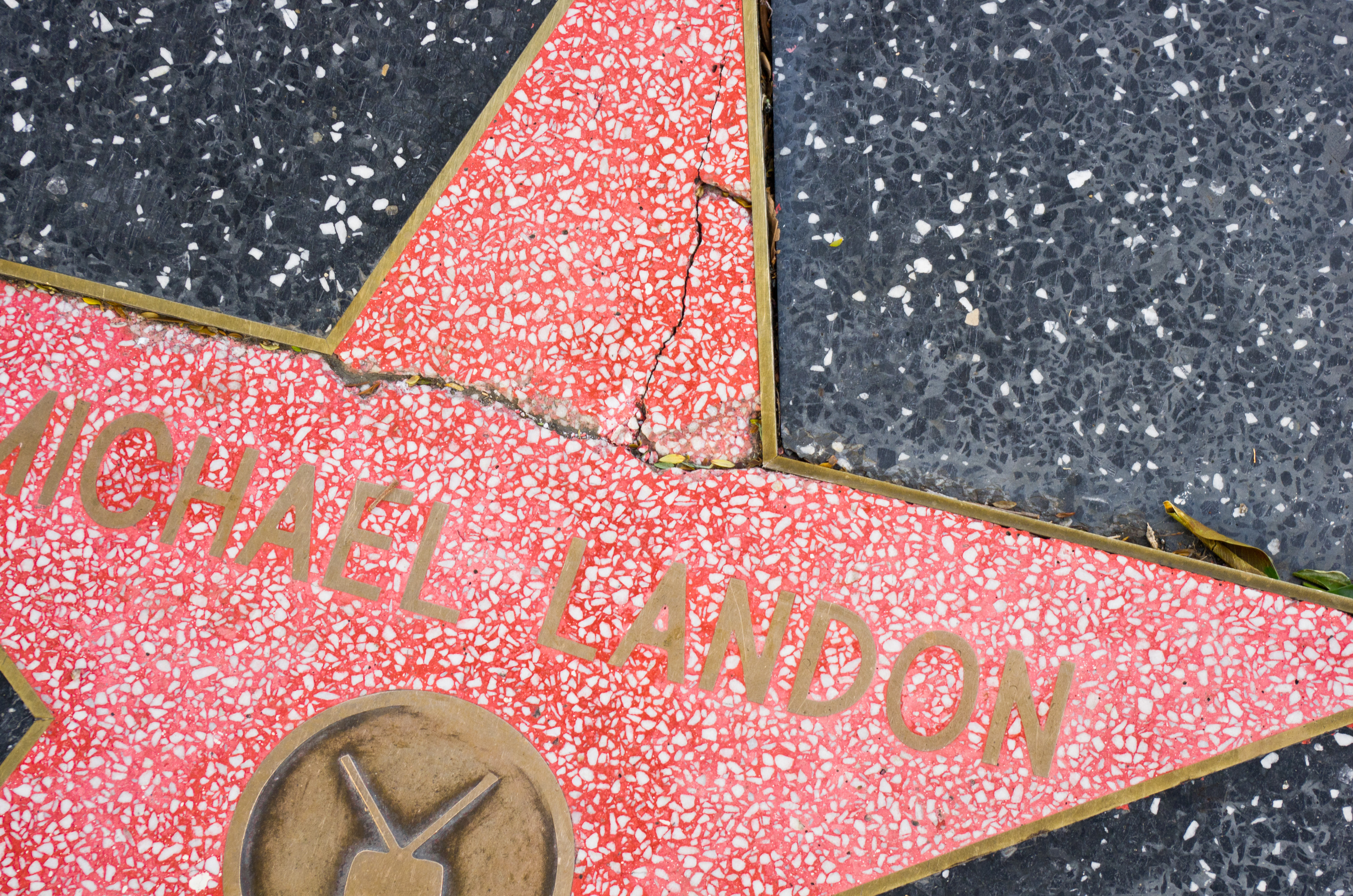
Michael Landon's star with cracks at its top, 2011

To encourage funding of the restoration by corporate sponsors, the Chamber inaugurated the "Friends of Walk of Fame" program in 2008. This program, which recognizes donors with honorary plaques near the Walk in front of Dolby Theatre, received criticism, being described by a Los Angeles Times reporter as "the latest corporate attempt to buy some good buzz." Another critic stated "I think Johnny Grant would roll over in his grave." Corporations that participated in the program include Absolut and L'Oreal, with the sponsorships costing about $1 million each.

In 2018, city council-member Mitch O'Farrell initiated a plan to improve the entire Walk of Fame corridor; the following year, the Los Angeles County Department of Public Works in conjunction with the Hollywood Chamber of Commerce, Hollywood Heritage, and the Hollywood Property Owners Alliance commissioned Gensler to plan a $4 million ($5.04 million in 2025) renovation. Gensler's proposal was released the following year; it proposed new landscaping and bike lanes, sidewalk dining and widening, and the removal of street lanes and parking between Argyle Avenue and La Brea Avenue. Streetscape improvements, including increasing sidewalk space; consolidating bus stops and adding bus shelters; adding benches, tables, and chairs for sidewalk dining; and removing parking lanes between Orange Drive and Gower Street, were approved in 2021 and funded in part by $7.2 million ($8.55 million in 2025) from Measure M.

=== Theft ===
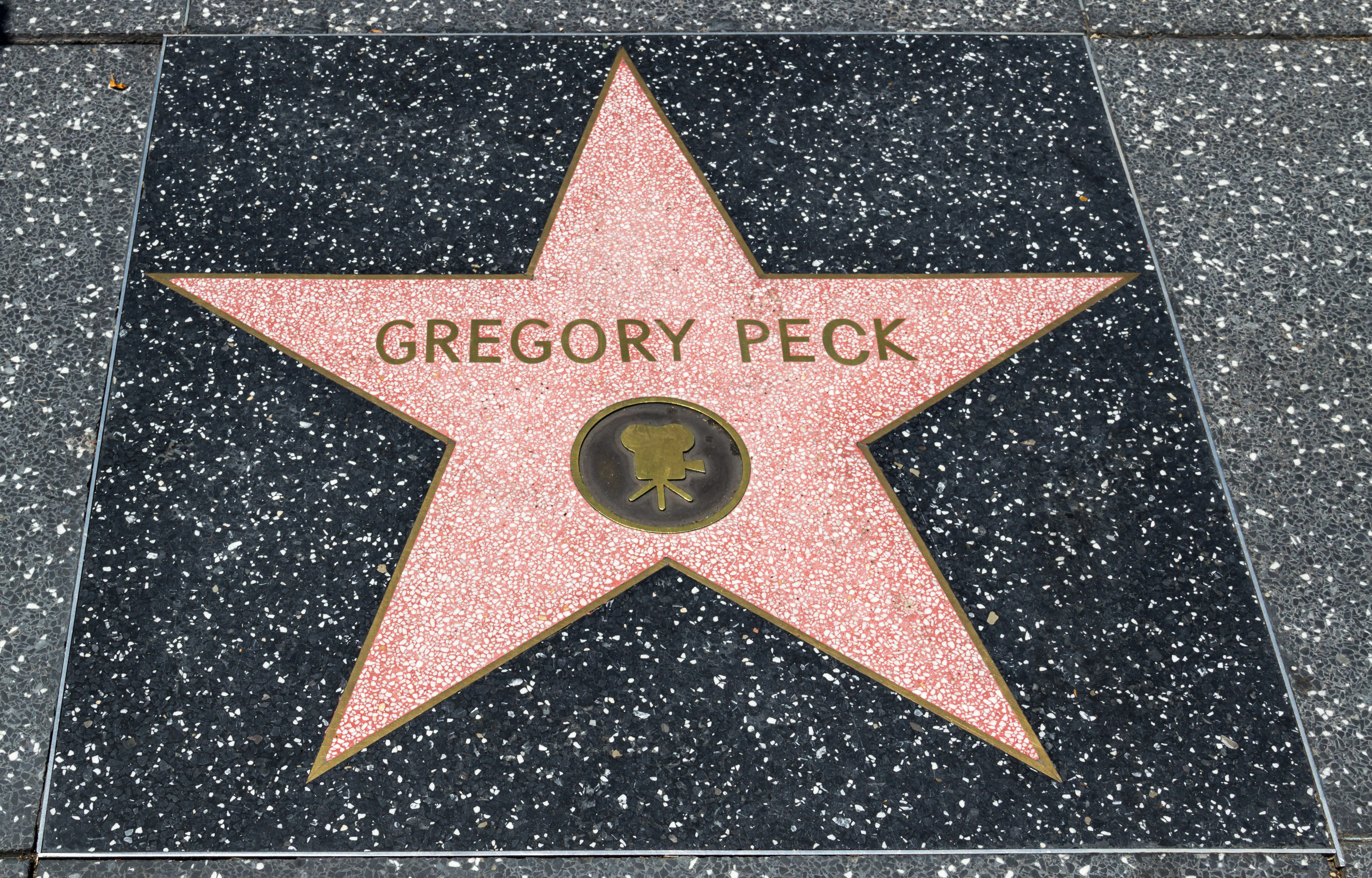
Gregory Peck's replacement star after the original was stolen in 2005

In 2000, James Stewart's and Kirk Douglas' stars disappeared after they had been temporarily removed for a construction project. Police recovered the stars in the home of a construction worker employed on the project; however, the stars were badly damaged and had to be remade. One of Gene Autry's five stars was also stolen from a construction area.

In 2005, thieves used a concrete saw to remove Gregory Peck's star from its site at Hollywood and North El Centro Avenue. The star was replaced almost immediately but the original was never found, nor were the perpetrators who stole it. Another theft occurred in 2019, when Austin Clay, who had previously vandalized Donald Trump's star, stole the Marilyn Monroe statue atop Hollywood and La Brea Gateway.

Thieves have also attempted to chisel out individual stars' category emblems.

== Honorees ==
While more than 2,850 stars have been awarded, because some individuals have been awarded multiple times, the number of individuals honored is not the same as the total star count. In the early 2010s, the Los Angeles Times estimated that approximately 2,200 individuals or groups were honored by the more than 2,400 stars issued at that time.

=== Diversity ===
An analysis in 2011 found that while minority representation was rising, minorities were underrepresented on the Walk. Of all stars, 5.1% honored African-Americans, 3.4% honored Hispanics, and 0.4% honored Asians, all of which were significantly less than those minorities' percentage of the overall population. Analysts and commentators were not surprised by this, as the same lack of representation was present in Hollywood as a whole. The Hollywood Chamber of Commerce responded by stating that it has been working hard to improve diversity; they also noted that several of the Walk's original honorees were minorities, including Anna May Wong, Dolores Del Rio, Cantinflas, and Hattie McDaniel.

=== Multiple honors ===
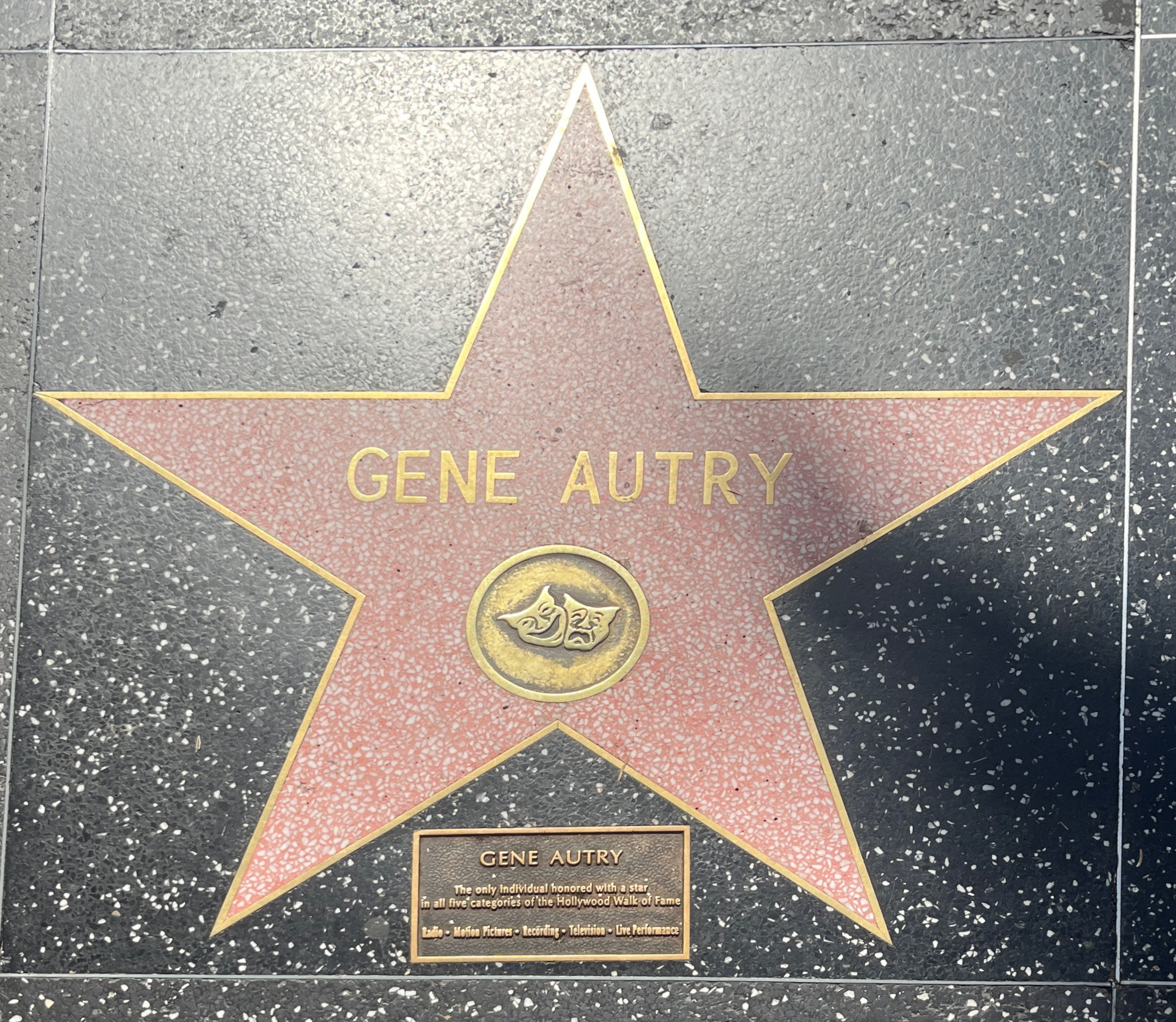
Gene Autry's star with a plaque noting him as the only individual with a star in all (at the time) five categories

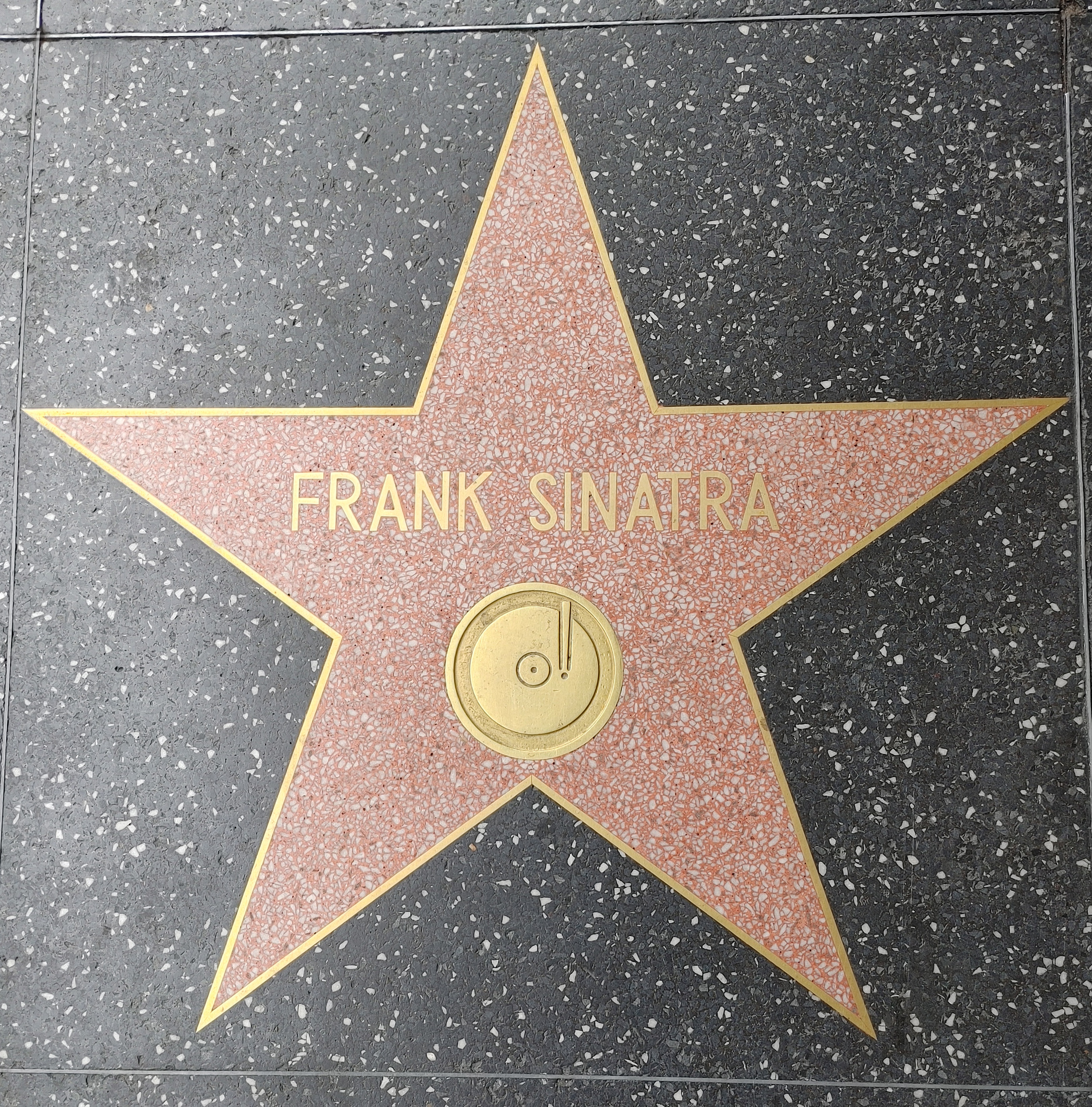
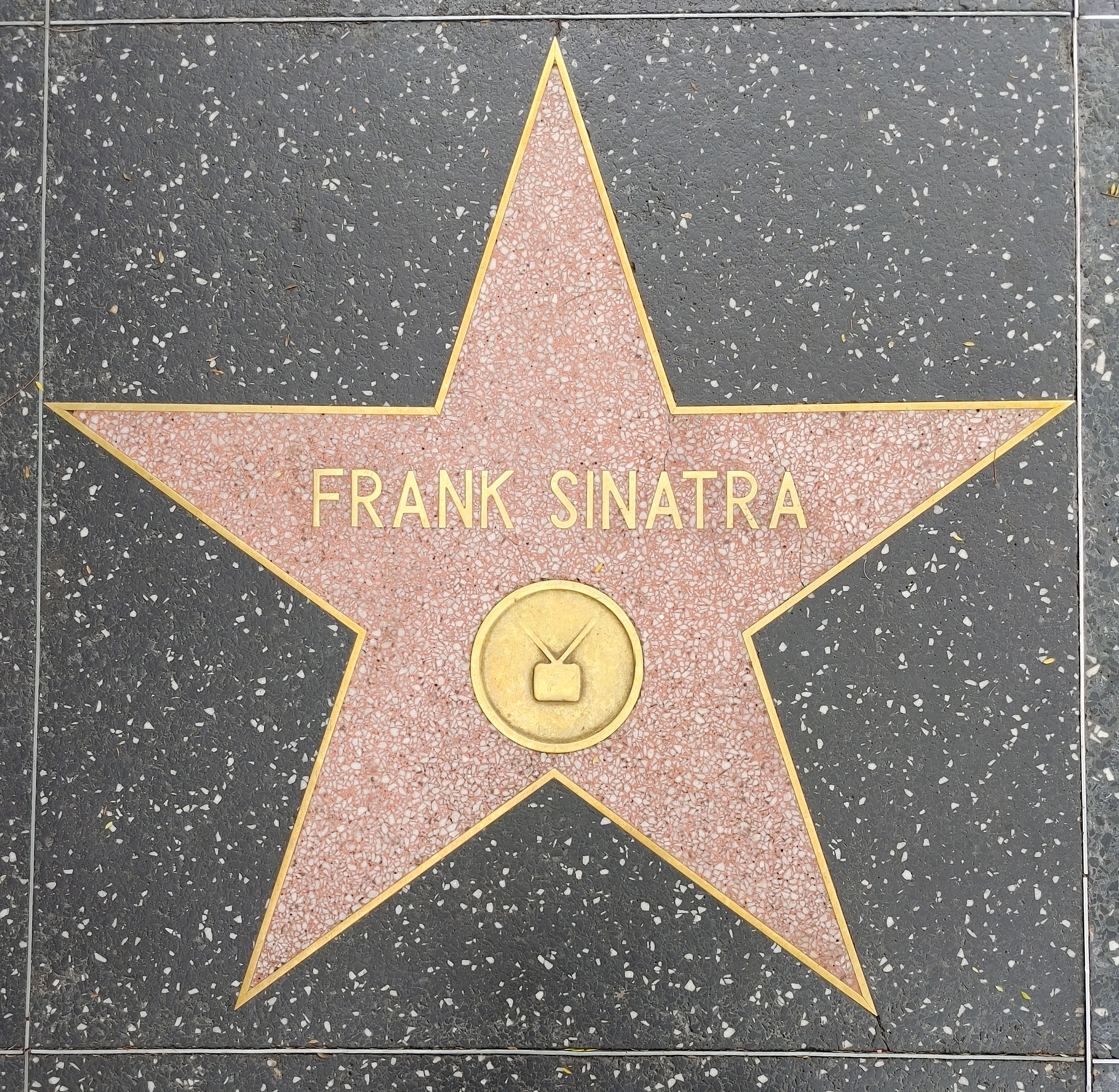
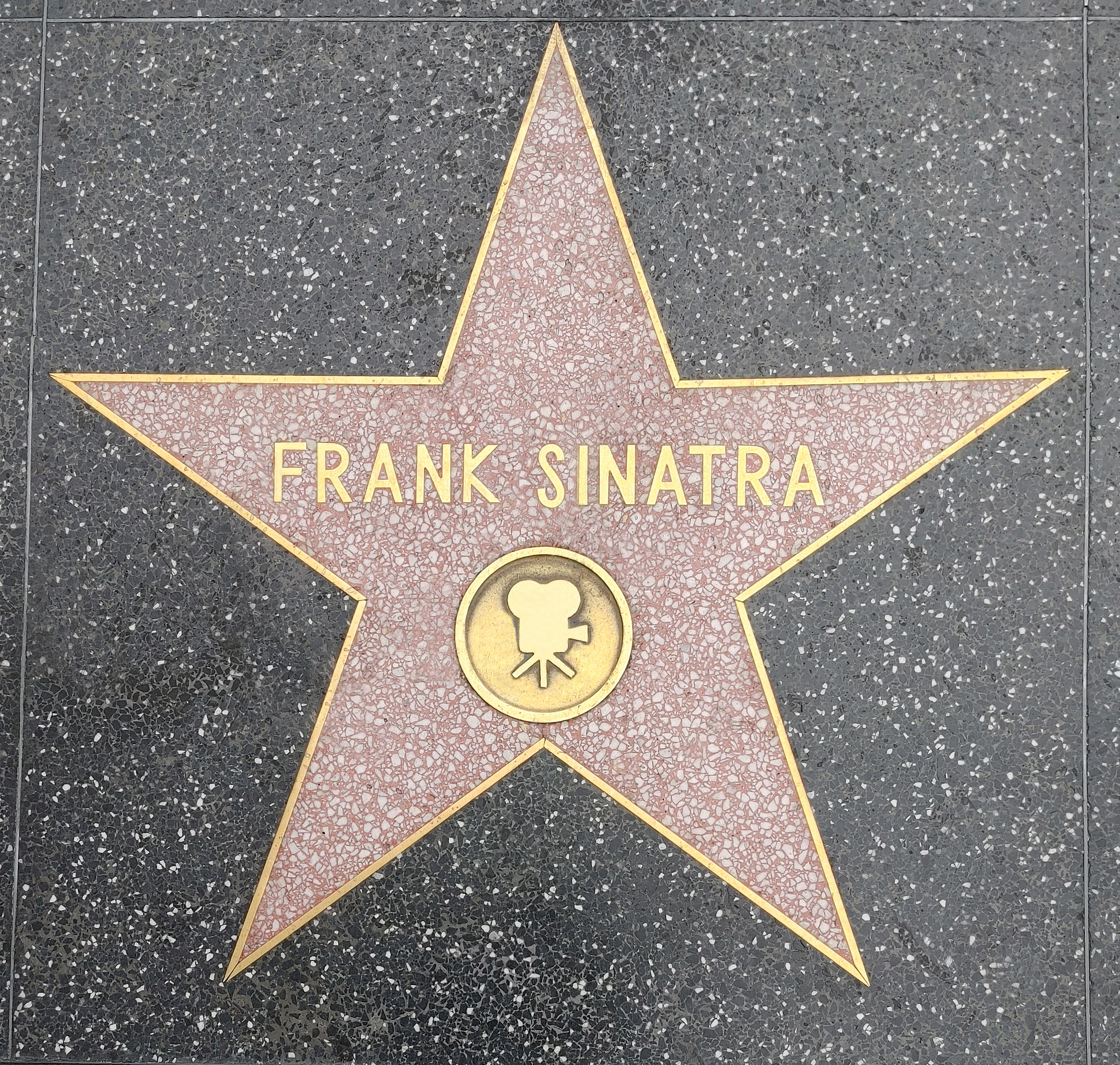
Frank Sinatra's three stars, for recording, television, and motion pictures

Gene Autry is the only person honored in five categories, while Bob Hope and Tony Martin have been honored in four and Roy Rogers and Mickey Rooney have been honored individually in three and in a shared star for a fourth, Roy Rogers as part of Sons of the Pioneers and Mickey Rooney with his wife Jan Chamberlin. More than thirty individuals have been honored in three categories, including Jack Benny, Danny Kaye, Frank Sinatra, Dinah Shore, and Gale Storm, and several have been honored in two, including Ron Howard, who was the first to receive an additional star in more than twenty years when he received his second in 2015. Additionally, Michael Jackson, Diana Ross, Smokey Robinson, and each member of The Beatles have been honored twice in the same category, individually and as part of a group.

The family with the most individuals recognized is the Barrymores, with six. Other families with three or more individuals recognized include the Bridges, Carradines, Dern-Ladds, Garland-Minnellis, Hustons, Lockharts, and Nelsons.

=== Unique and unusual ===
==== Professions ====
Several below-the-line filmmakers have been included in the Walk, including: Conrad Hall, Leon Shamroy, Hal Mohr, and Haskell Wexler (cinematographers); Edith Head and Ruth E. Carter (costume designers); Yakima Canutt (stuntman); Walter Lantz (animator); Rick Baker, John Chambers, Max Factor, and The Westmores (makeup artists); and Ray Harryhausen, Dennis Muren, and Stan Winston (visual effects, special effects, and special makeup effects artists). Max Factor was a makeup manufacturer as well.

Novelists are not covered by the Walk; however, some novelists have stars, including Sidney Sheldon, who wrote screenplays before becoming a novelist; Ray Bradbury, whose work has been adapted into numerous movies and television programs; and Harold Robbins, who also had experience in the film industry. Film critic Roger Ebert has a star, although it is in the television category as his review shows were televised. Movie theater proprietors are also included, most notably Sid Grauman, whose theaters included the Chinese, Egyptian, Million Dollar, and Rialto, and Earvin Magic Johnson, former owner of Magic Johnson Theaters.

Numerous inventors have stars on the Walk, including: George Eastman, inventor of roll film; Herbert Kalmus, co-developer of color film; Thomas Edison, developer of many devices used in the film industry, including the phonograph, motion picture camera, and long-lasting, practical electric light bulb; Auguste and Louis Lumière, developers of several motion picture-related machines including cameras and projectors; William Selig, inventor of the Selig Standard Camera and Selig Polyscope; Sigmund Lubin, developer of his own motion picture camera and projector; Jerry Fairbanks, developer of television's three camera system and co-developer of the Zoomar lens; Lee de Forest, inventor of the audion and phonofilm; Ray Dolby, a pioneer in audio technology and chief electronics designer for Quadruplex videotape; Merian C. Cooper, co-developer of the Cinerama process; and Mark Serrurier, who re-designed Moviola, which was invented by his father. Hedy Lamarr, co-inventor of a frequency-hopping spread spectrum system that was further developed for use in military communication and wireless technology, is also honored but for her acting work.

Several honorees have achieved political notability. Presidents Ronald Reagan and Donald Trump have stars, and Reagan is also one of two California governors with a star; the other is Arnold Schwarzenegger. Former U.S. Senator George Murphy and Representatives Helen Gahagan and Sonny Bono have stars, as does former Prime Minister of Poland Ignacy Paderewski.

Judges have also received stars, including Judge Greg Mathis, Judge Judy Sheindlin, and Judge Joseph Wapner. These stars are all in the television category, as the judges' courts were televised.

==== Animals ====
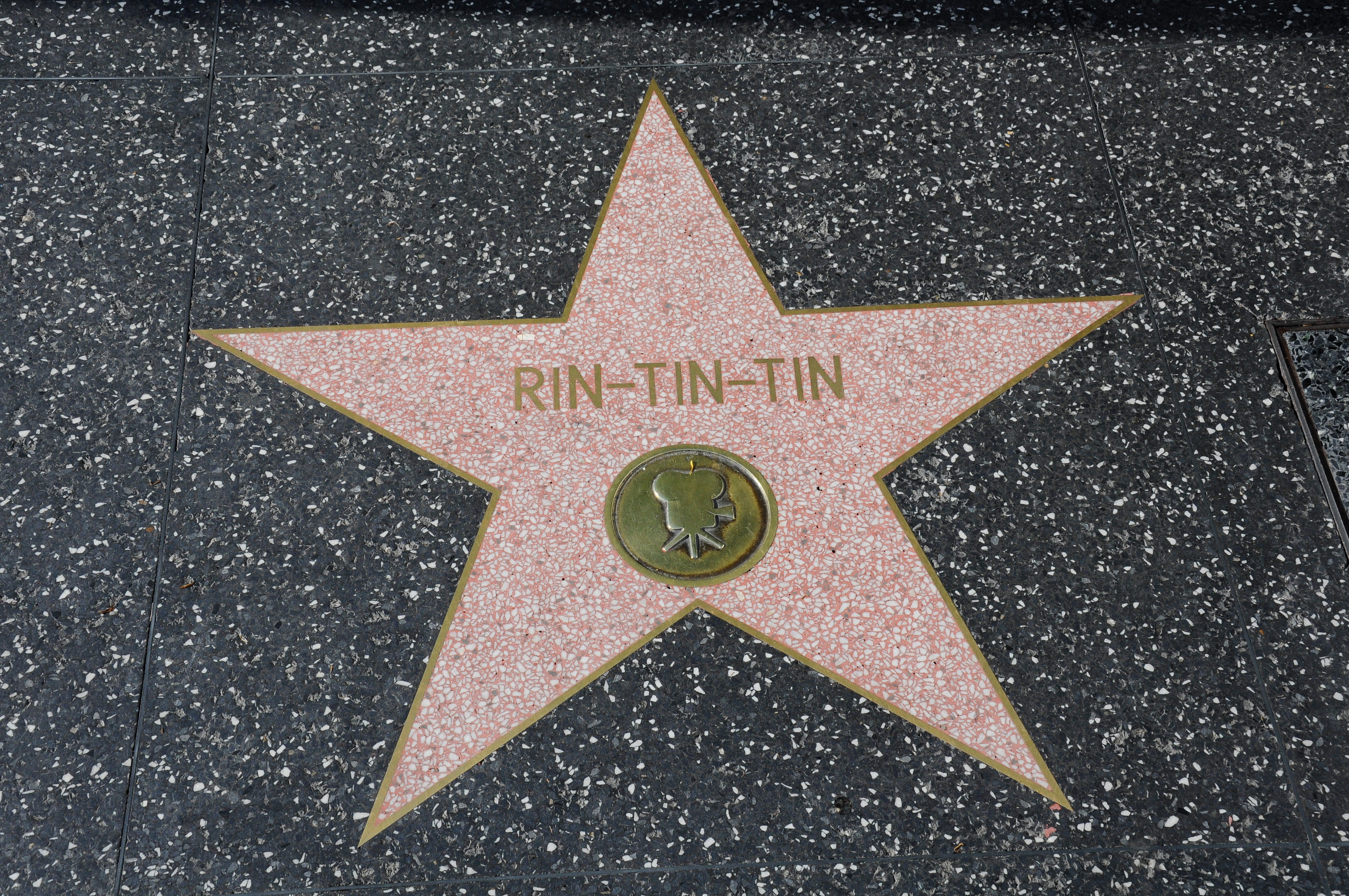
Rin-Tin-Tin's star, given for his work in motion pictures

Three dogs are included in the Walk: the fictional character Lassie and animal actors Rin Tin Tin and Strongheart. An animated dog, Snoopy, is also included, as are several other animated animals.

==== Fictional characters ====
In addition to members of the entertainment industry, the Walk also honors fictional characters, with more than twenty honored as of 2024.

The first fictional characters honored were Lassie and Betty Lou; both were included when the Walk was unveiled in 1960. Mickey Mouse, the first fictional character added after the Walk's original unveiling, was added in 1978 in honor of his 50th anniversary. (Note: Many sources list Mickey Mouse as the first fictional character to be honored by, added to, or to receive a star on the Walk of Fame, including the New York Times, Chicago Tribune, The Independent, Entertainment Weekly, and the Guinness Book of World Records.) Minnie Mouse was honored forty years later; when she was, her star was located directly outside El Capitan, Disney's flagship theater. Numerous other animated characters have been added during anniversary years, including Bugs Bunny on his 45th (in 1985), The Simpsons and Rugrats on their 10th (2000 and 2001, respectively), Shrek on his 20th (2010), Snoopy on his 65th (2015), and Alvin and the Chipmunks on their 60th (2019); Godzilla was also honored on his 50th anniversary, in 2004. In 1987, Snow White became the first Disney princess honored and in 2024, Batman became the first superhero honored.

Clayton Moore, whose name is considered synonymous with the Lone Ranger, was honored with a star that includes both his name and the character. Tommy Riggs is also listed alongside Betty Lou, a character he voiced. A third actor tightly linked to a specific character, Paul Reubens as Pee-wee Herman, is also honored, although in this case the star lists only the character, not the actor. The Muppets collectively have three stars, one for the group and the others for Kermit the Frog and Big Bird; Muppets' creator Jim Henson has a star as well.

==== Shared names ====
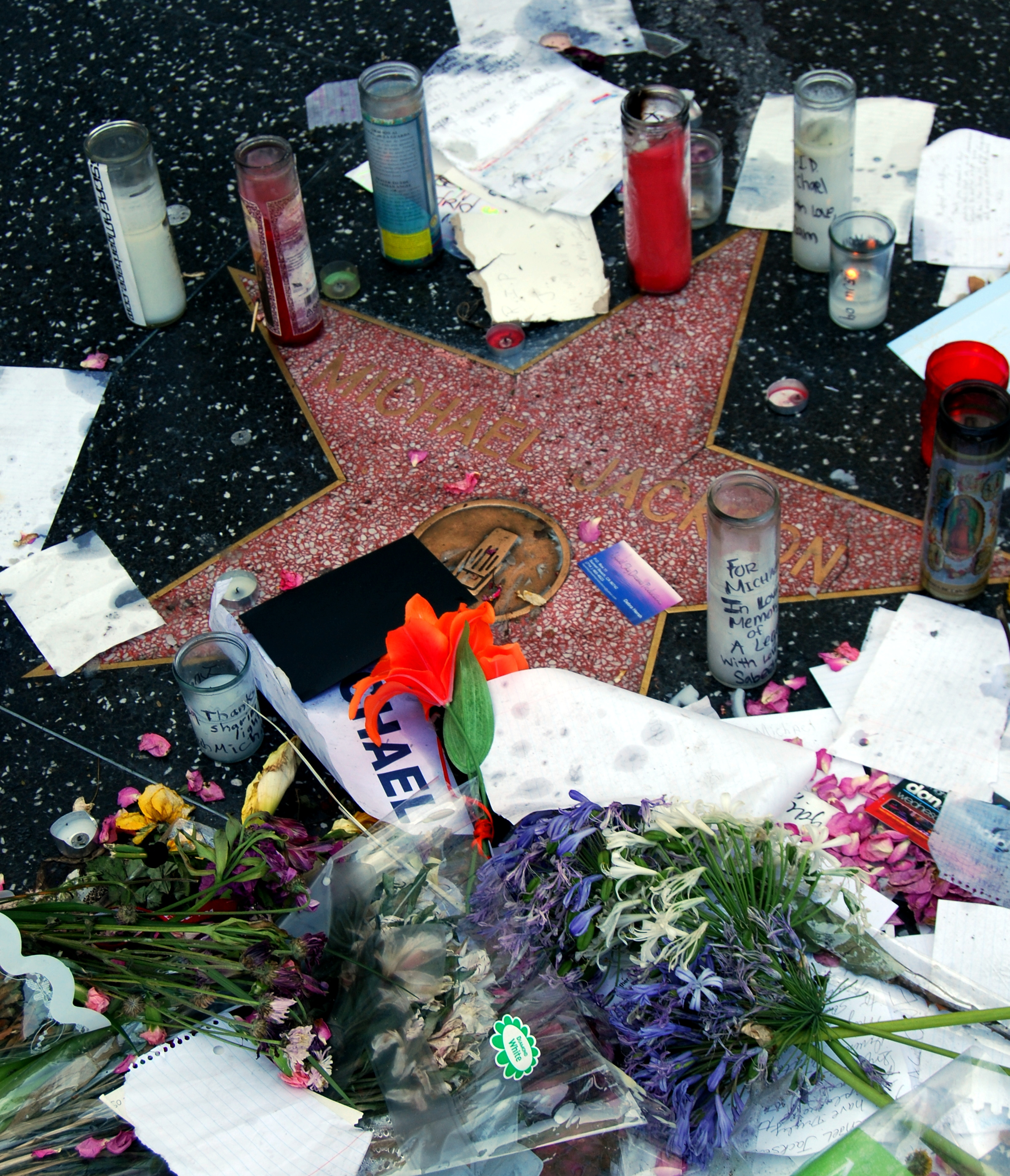
Radio personality Michael Jackson's star after the 2009 death of the musician of the same name

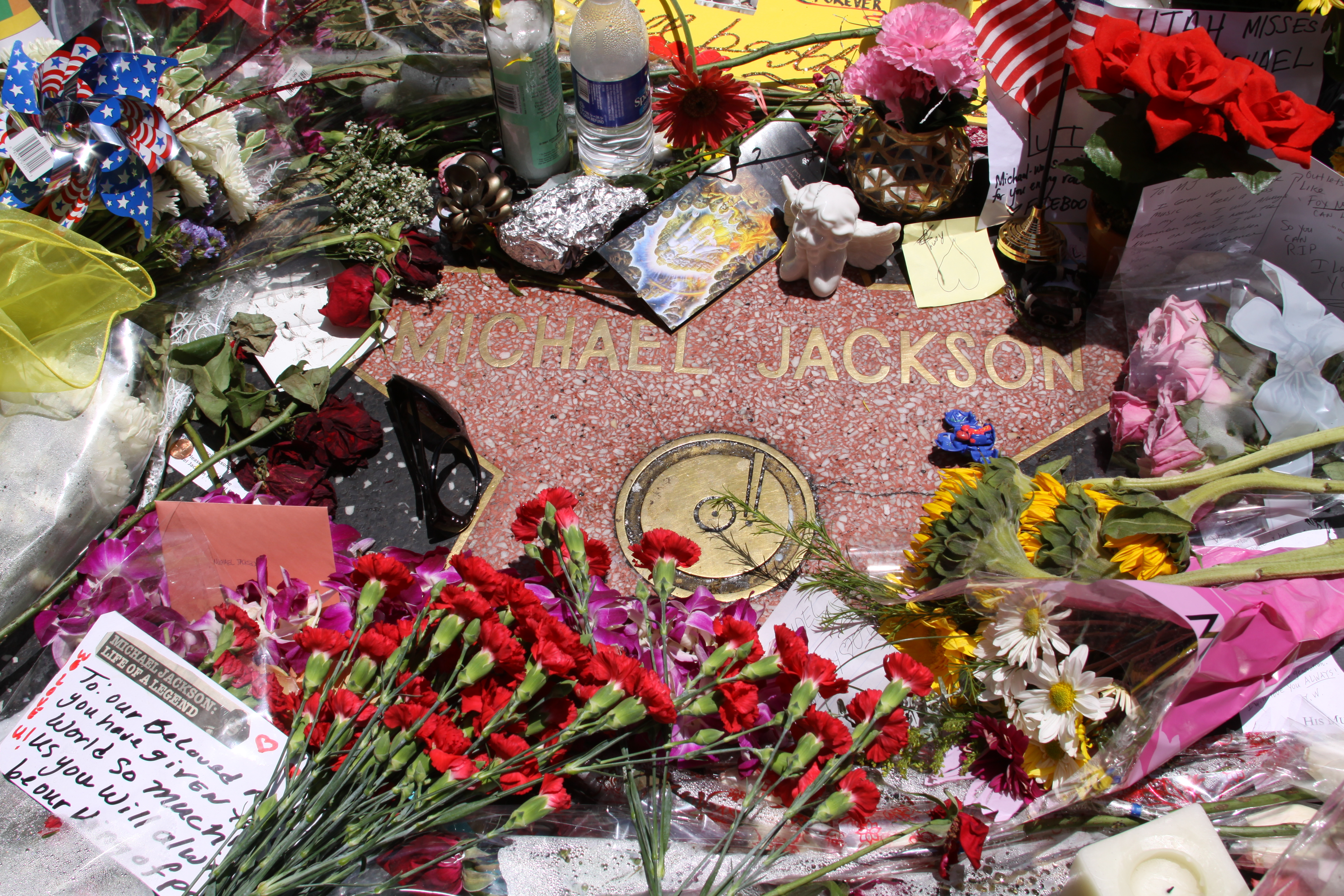
Musician and recording artist Michael Jackson's star about two weeks after his death

Two pairs of stars share identical names representing different people. There are two Harrison Ford stars, one for the silent-film actor and the other for the more recent actor, and two Michael Jackson stars, one for the pop singer and the other for the radio personality. After singer Michael Jackson's death in 2009, many fans mistakenly paid tribute at the radio personality's star, the singer's being inaccessible due to the premiere of Brüno.

==== Groups and pairings ====
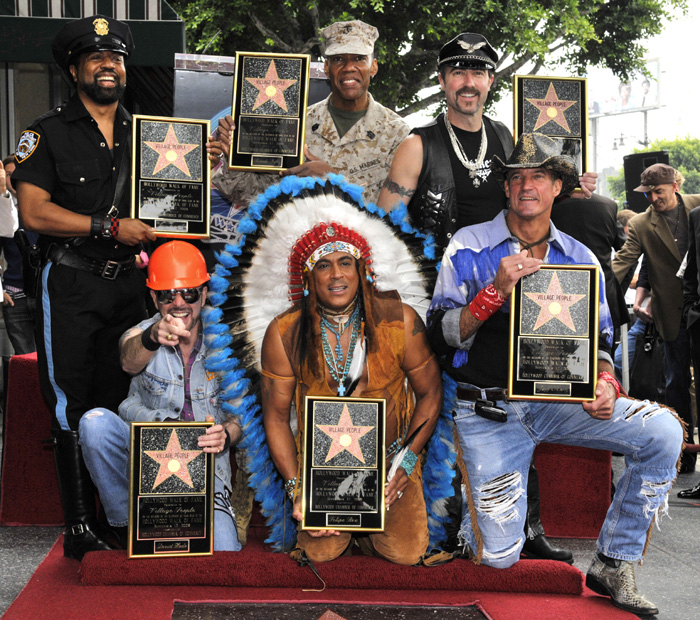
Village People at their star unveiling in 2008

Some stars honor groups, not individuals. Dozens of music groups have been honored, including The Beatles, The Beach Boys, The Jackson 5, The Supremes, Queen, Village People, Green Day, Backstreet Boys, and Destiny’s Child. Sports teams are also honored, including the Harlem Globetrotters and Los Angeles Dodgers.

Other stars honor professional pairings rather than individuals. Examples include radio co-hosts Al Lohman & Roger Barkley, Ken Minyard & Bob Arthur, Mark & Brian, and Mark & Kim; live performers Siegfried & Roy and Jan & Mickey Rooney; television writers Sid & Marty Krofft; actors Mary-Kate & Ashley Olsen; and music duos Sonny & Cher, BeBe & CeCe Winans, Steve Lawrence & Eydie Gorme, and Daryl Hall & John Oates. Mary-Kate and Ashley Olsen are the only twins to share a star.

==== Repeat selections and entries ====
Apollo 11 astronauts Neil Armstrong, Buzz Aldrin, and Michael Collins share four monuments, one on each corner of Hollywood and Vine, all in the television category. Similarly, George Eastman was given two stars in the same category for the same achievement: the invention of roll film.

Charlie Chaplin is the only honoree to be selected twice for the same star. He was unanimously voted into the initial group in 1956, but the Selection Committee ultimately excluded him, reportedly due to questions regarding his morals but also possibly due to his political views. Chaplin was re-selected and added in 1972; he received an honorary Academy Award that same year. Paul Robeson was another whose views reportedly contributed to the committee's decision against awarding him a star; however, the resulting outcry was so intense that the decision was reversed and Robeson was awarded a star one year later, in 1979.

=== Organizations ===
To be considered for an Award of Excellence, commercial organizations must have a Hollywood connection and at least fifty years of service in show business. While not technically on the Walk, as the City of Los Angeles prohibits corporate names on sidewalks, these stars are installed on private property adjacent to it. The Walt Disney Company was the first company to receive an Award of Excellence, for Disneyland, while Musso and Frank was the first restaurant and Chevy Suburban the first inanimate object to receive these awards. Other commercial organizations with Awards of Excellence include The Hollywood Reporter, KTLA, Hanna-Barbera, Los Angeles Dodgers, Variety, and Victoria's Secret Angels.

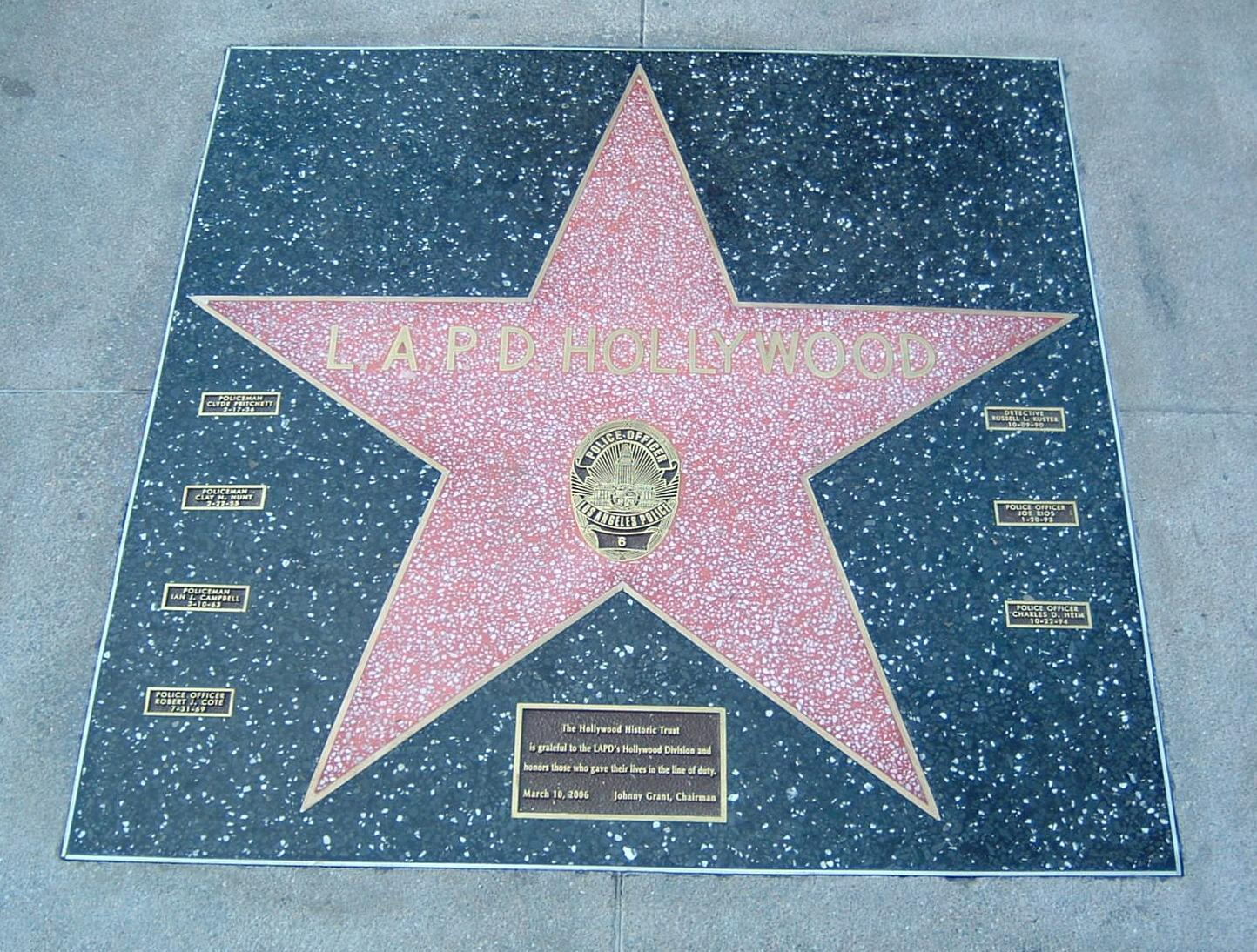
Los Angeles Police Department Hollywood Division's Award of Excellence in 2001

Non-commercial organizations honored with Awards of Excellence include the Los Angeles Fire Department (LAFD), Los Angeles Police Department (LAPD) Hollywood Division, The Recording Academy, Screen Actors Guild, and the Walk of Fame itself. The LAPD Hollywood Division star is accompanied by the names of several division officers killed in the line of duty, while LAFD received their award the same year as the January 2025 Southern California wildfires; the latter was suggested by an eighth grader in Orange, Connecticut, as part of an assignment to write a letter about heroes.

=== Errors ===
Several stars have been unveiled with the wrong name. Film and television actor Don Haggerty's star originally displayed the first name "Dan"; the name was corrected and then, years later, television actor Dan Haggerty (no relation to Don) received his own star. Other stars that bear the wrong name include Thomas Kane Tully's, which reads "Thomas L. Tully", and Mauritz Stiller's prior to 1988, when it read "Maurice Diller".

In addition to incorrect names, some honorees' names have been misspelled. In 2010, Julia Louis-Dreyfus's star was constructed reading "Julia Luis Dreyfus". The actress reportedly thought the mistake was hysterical and wanted it to remain, but it was corrected. Similarly, Dick Van Dyke's star misspelled his last name as "Vandyke" before it was rectified, and several names remain misspelled, including Lotte Lehmann (misspelled as "Lottie"), Merian C. Cooper ("Meriam"), and Auguste Lumière ("August"). Some stars also contain emblems that do not match the category the honoree was honored in, including Carmen Miranda, who was honored in the motion picture category but her star bears the television emblem, and Larry King, who was honored in the television category but his star bears a motion picture emblem.

=== Controversial ===
Several honorees have resulted in controversy, some immediately when honored and others later. Charlie Chaplin's initial selection was so controversial (reportedly due to questions about his morals but also possibly due to his political views) that it was revoked, and today his inclusion would be questioned due to his multiple relationships with minors. Marlon Brando's inclusion received backlash following reports of anti-Semitism, as did Gal Gadot's due to her outspoken support of the Israeli military.

Numerous individuals and organizations have called or petitioned for the removal of Donald Trump's star, including local residents, Latino advocacy groups, and West Hollywood City Council, the latter of which stated that "the Hollywood Walk of Fame is an honor. When one belittles and attacks minorities, immigrants, Muslims, people with disabilities or women – the honor no longer exists." In 2016, an online petition to have Trump's star removed received more than 40,000 signatures. Others have also come to the star's defense.

Spade Cooley is the only convicted murderer honored by the Walk. He is not the only murderer though, as Gig Young is known to have murdered his wife. Young was never convicted, however, as he committed suicide shortly after. Other controversial criminal-related stars include those of accused domestic and sexual abusers, including accused rapists. The MeToo movement saw concerted efforts to have several of these honorees removed, most notably Bill Cosby both before and after his sexual assault conviction that was later overturned. Similar removal campaigns were held against Sean Combs.

Some honorees are controversial because they are considered to have lost their fame, never been famous enough in the first place, not done enough to earn their star or fame, lacked talent, or otherwise been unworthy. Honorees that have been described in this manner include Britney Spears, Gal Gadot, Olive Borden, Louise Fazenda, David Spade, Vanna White, and Michael Bolton.

=== Rejected ===
The Chamber rejects about 85–90% of the nominations it receives each year. (Note: According to the Walk's FAQ, each year an average of 30 new stars are selected from 200–300 nominations. However, according to the Nomination FAQ, an average of 24–30 are selected from 200 nominations.) Rejections are not made public; however, after Kim Kardashian publicly stated her desire for a star, the Chamber clarified that her nomination would be rejected as the Walk does not honor reality stars unless they have been nominated for or won an Oscar, Emmy, Grammy, or other major award given for a performance. In another instance, when asked if the Walk would ever honor reality stars, the Chamber responded "Hell to the no." Another known rejection was "Weird Al" Yankovic, who was rejected eleven times before being accepted in 2017. A campaign to get King Kong a star was unsuccessful as well.

Numerous individuals have been selected for the Walk but rejected the honor, including Leonardo DiCaprio, Julia Roberts, Madonna, Bruce Springsteen, Denzel Washington, Clint Eastwood, and Prince, the latter of whom rejected it twice. Others, including Whitney Houston, Al Pacino, George Clooney, and Will Smith, de facto rejected their star by never scheduling an unveiling.

== Visitors ==
Hugo Martín wrote in the Los Angeles Times that the Walk of Fame has been a significant contributor towards making tourism the largest industry in Los Angeles County. It attracts about ten million visitors annually, which according to a 2003 report by market research firm NFO Plog Research is more than the Sunset Strip, Grauman's Chinese, Queen Mary, and the Los Angeles County Museum of Art. In 2025, U.S. News ranked the Walk as the third best attraction in Los Angeles, after Griffith Observatory and the Getty Center. It can be accessed via car, bike, bus, tour bus, and two subway stations: Hollywood/Highland and Hollywood/Vine.

Despite the Walk's popularity and prestige, visitors are often underwhelmed due to its perceived dirtiness, grittiness, and problems with homelessness and crime. The Walk has repeatedly been called the "Walk of Shame" and "the world's worst tourist attraction"; it has also been described as "cheesy", "tacky", a "promotional gambit", and a tourist trap.

=== Street vendors and performers ===
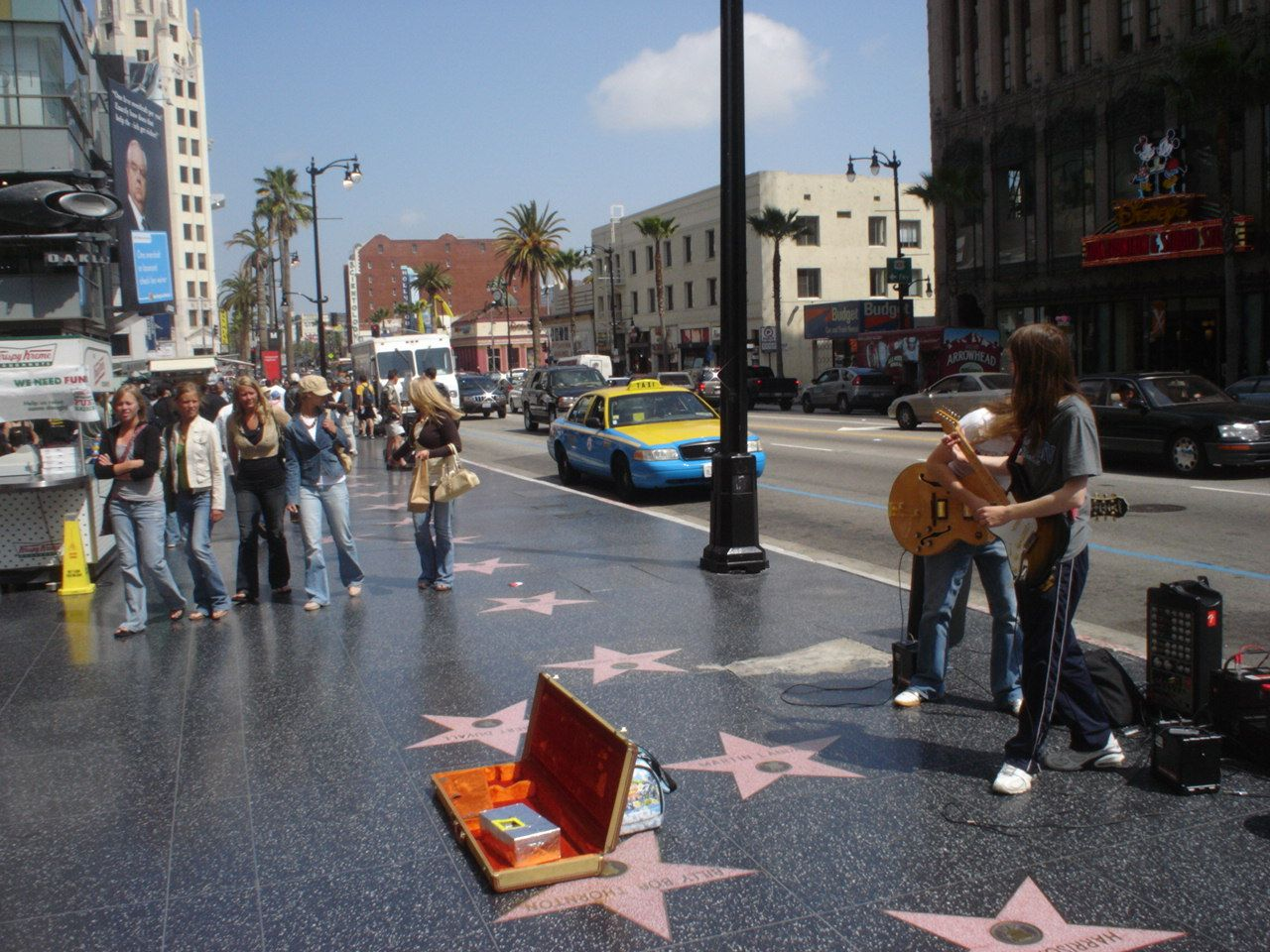
Buskers performing on the Walk

The Walk of Fame is one of Los Angeles's most popular locations for street vendors. In 2018, street vending was banned, but the ban was rescinded in 2024. Vendors commonly sell merchandise or bacon-wrapped hot dogs.

Buskers, musicians distributing albums, and other street and costumed performers also frequent the Walk, particularly outside Grauman's Chinese Theater and Madame Tussauds Hollywood. In 2016, City Council considered limiting the number permitted in the area, as many visitors report negative experiences due to the performers' rude and aggressive behavior. The performers have also been known to get into altercations with each other.

=== Unveilings ===
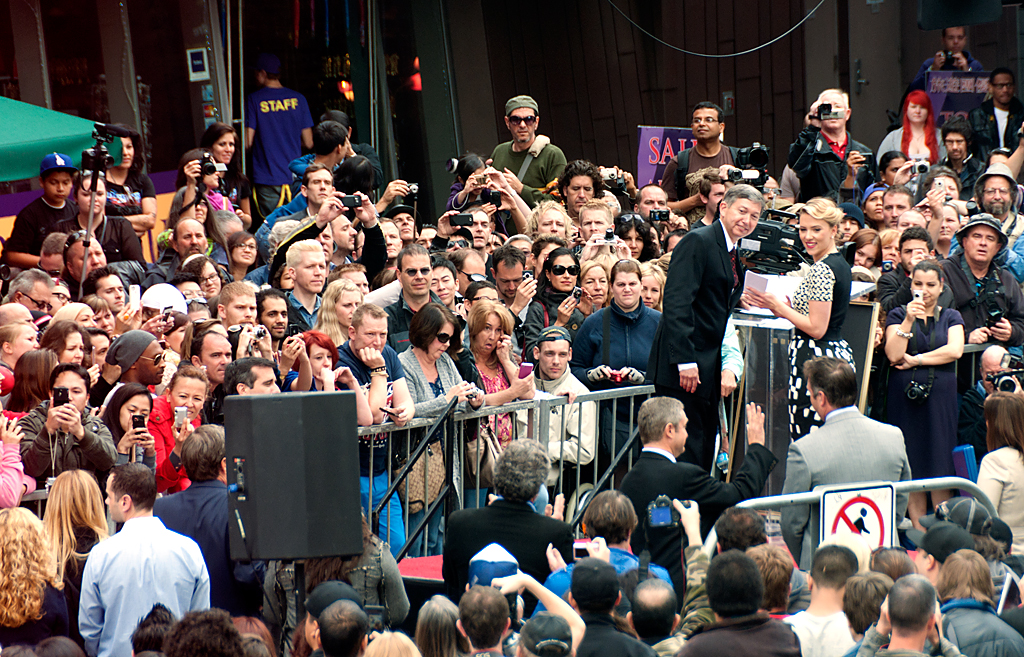
A portion of the crowd at Scarlett Johansson's star unveiling in 2012

Star unveilings are free to attend; are almost always paid for by a studio, network, record label, or other corporate patron; usually coincide with a new release from the honoree; and attract crowds in the dozens, hundreds, or thousands. Michael Jackson's unveiling in 1984 set a record for the highest number of attendees, with 5,000; however, the spokeswoman for the Hollywood Chamber of Commerce stated that the 4,500 attendees at Selena Quintanilla's unveiling in 2017 was a record, surpassing the previous high of 4,000 at Vicente Fernandez's unveiling in 1998. Anthony Anderson's unveiling, which occurred during the COVID-19 pandemic, had a notably low attendance of 25.

In addition to fans, unveilings are often attended by celebrity entourages. Some unveilings also include performances, for example, Home Free sang at Don McLean's unveiling, a children's choir sang at Andrea Bocelli's, a brass band played at Winnie the Pooh's, and marching bands have played at several unveilings, including those for Bob Hope, Ringo Starr, Jerry Buss, Gary Collins, the Munchkins, and the Red Hot Chili Peppers.

=== Tributes ===
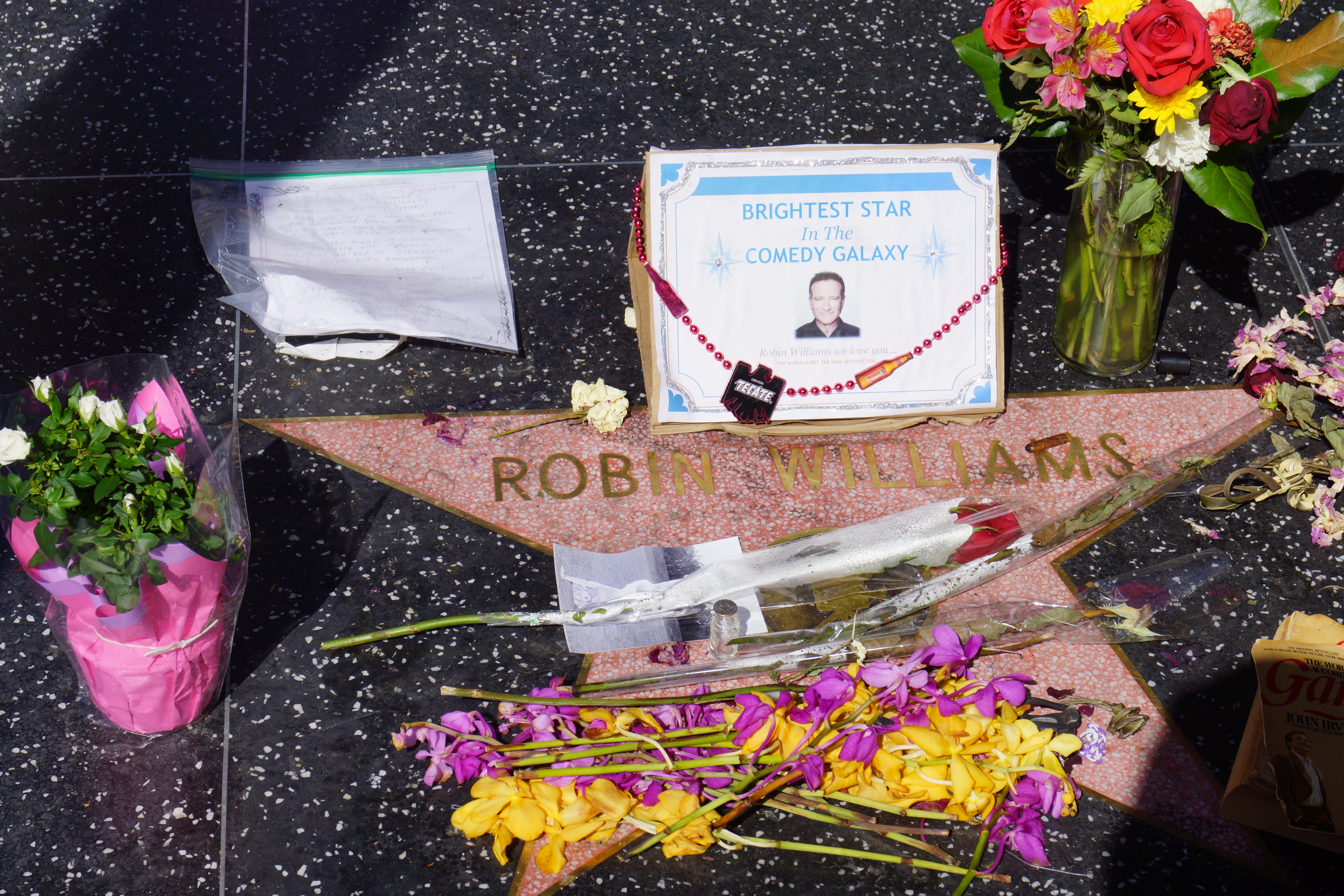
Robin Williams's star shortly after his death in 2014

The Hollywood Chamber of Commerce has adopted the tradition of placing flower wreaths at the stars of newly deceased honorees; as a result, these stars often become memorial and vigil sites. Fans often show respect by leaving flowers and messages, and some continue to do so on anniversary remembrances. Others show support in other ways; for example, Julio Iglesias's star was cleaned and polished once a month by a group of elderly women and Barry Manilow's star was buffed by a mother-daughter pair once a week.

=== Rallies, protests, and vandalism ===
Walk of Fame stars are sometimes used as sites for rallies or protests. Often, the protests occur as vandalism, which has ranged from profanity and political statements to damage with heavy tools. In 2005, closed circuit surveillance cameras were installed on Hollywood between La Brea and Vine to discourage these activities. Additionally, if an honoree has a large enough scandal, police will increase their presence around that person's star to deter vandalism.

Donald Trump's star, obtained for his work on the Miss Universe pageant and The Apprentice, has been the site of numerous protests and rallies; it has also been vandalized multiple times. During the 2016 presidential election, a service dog's owner had the dog defecate on Trump's star, which was then posted on Twitter. Shortly after, the star was placed behind a miniature border wall, and in October, James Otis, an heir to the Otis Elevator Company fortune, used a pickaxe and sledgehammer to destroy the star. Otis readily admitted to the vandalism and was fined $4,000 ($5,366 in 2025) and sentenced to twenty days of work for the California Department of Transportation and three years' probation. The star was repaired and continued to serve as the site of rallies and protests throughout and after the election.

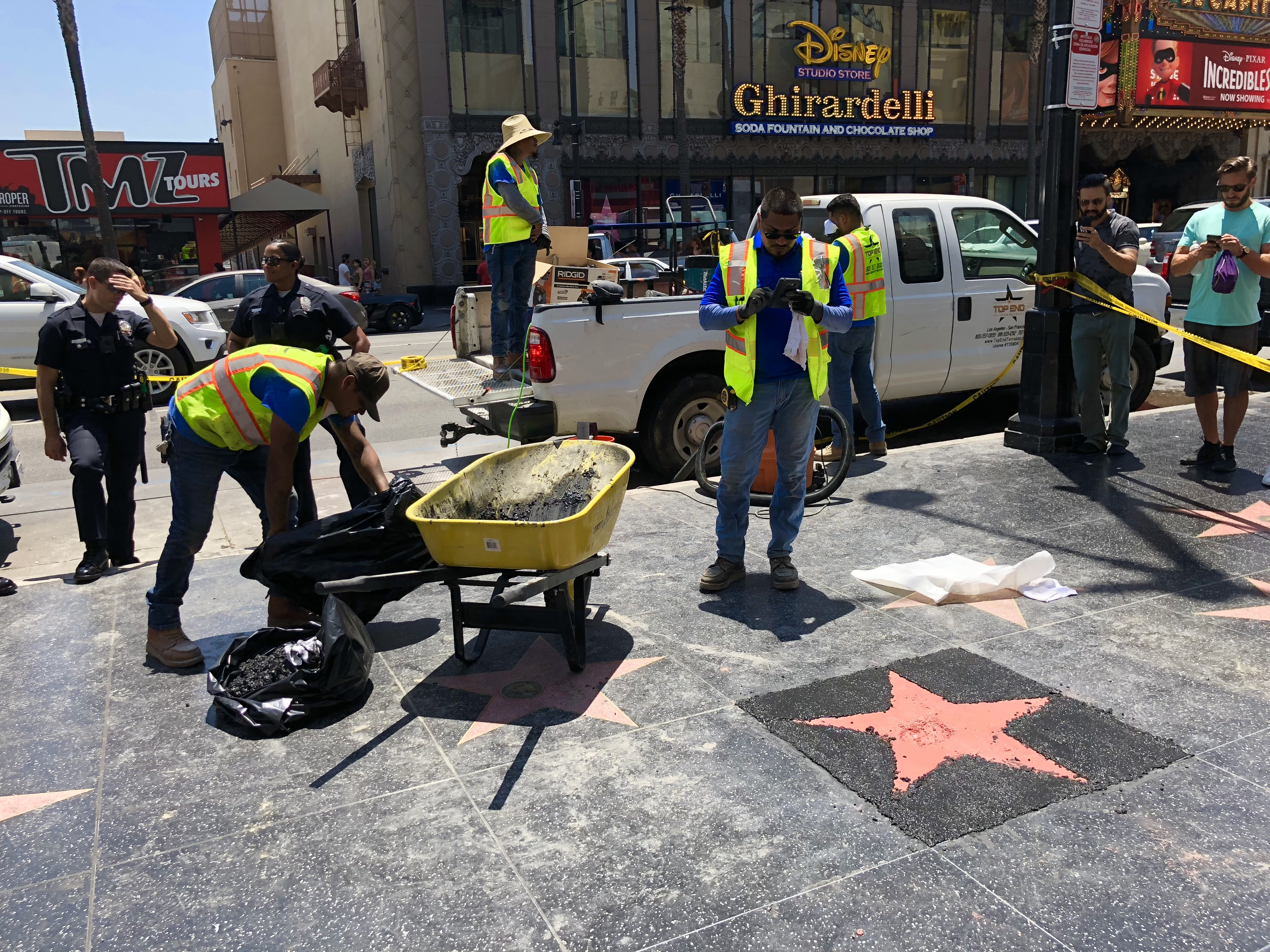
Donald Trump's star under repair after vandalism in 2018

In 2017, Trump's star was covered in protest stickers shortly before his inauguration and also during Los Angeles Pride. A golden toilet with the words "Take a Trump" was also placed beside Trump's star that year. Further vandalism occurred in 2018 when Trump's star was destroyed again, this time by Austin Clay. Clay later surrendered to police, after which he was sentenced to one day in jail, twenty days of community service, and three years of probation. He was also ordered to undergo psychological counseling and pay $9,404.46 ($12,058 in 2025) in restitution. Later in 2018, the star was "guarded" by fake Russian soldiers, placed behind bars, and defaced with swastikas, fake blood, and other graffiti. It was also the site of multiple fights and elsewhere on the Walk, dozens of blank stars were vandalized in support of Trump's star. Trump's star was vandalized multiple times again in 2019 and 2020, including with a pickaxe, with dog feces, and with spray-paint. The star was vandalized again in 2026.

Other politicians' stars have not seen the same level of protests or vandalism; however, Ronald Reagan's star was the site of a 1981 gathering to request signatures petitioning him to keep leopards on the endangered species list. The star was also peed on for David Bowie's Day-In Day-Out music video; however, the moment was removed so that MTV would accept the video into their rotation.

Protests and vandalism of non-politicians' stars also occur. In 2009, Sharon Stone's, Mary-Kate and Ashley Olsen's, and Aretha Franklin's stars had the words "Old Fur Hag", "Fur Hags", and "Fur Hag" written on them, presumably in protest of them wearing fur clothing. In 2015, Sofia Vergara's star was graffitied in reference to her use of frozen embryos. In 2017, Bob Marley's star was damaged by a heavy object and protesters also gathered around Kevin Spacey's star to protest predatory culture in Hollywood. In 2018, Jennifer Lopez, Ellen DeGeneres, Pharrell Williams, and Michael Bublé's stars were sprayed with black paint, and in 2024, Selena Quintanilla and Jenni Rivera's stars were covered in black paint twice within 24 hours. In 2025, Gal Gadot's star was vandalized in reference to the Israeli military, and Dolly Parton's star was vandalized shortly after her death in 2026. Bill Cosby's star has been vandalized multiple times, including in 2014 and 2018, and in 2015 protestors (including Lili Bernard and Victoria Valentino) used the site to protest rape limitation laws in California. Radio commentator Michael Jackson's star has also been defaced (presumably, it was mistaken for the singer's star with the same name), after which Paris Jackson cleaned it up.

Not all Walk of Fame protests are directed at individuals. For example, in 1988, activists sledgehammered the Walk's curb in support of the Americans with Disabilities Act; in 2014, protestors wrote messages on the Walk in response to the decision not to indict Eric Garner's killer; in 2017, MeToo movement supporters marched along the Walk; in 2020, the Walk was the gathering point for an estimated 25,000 Black Lives Matter protestors; and in 2022, activists held an abortion rights rally on the Walk.

Finally, not all vandalism on the Walk is a form of protest. For example, John Lennon's star was defaced with several non-negative messages in 2013, Hugh Hefner's star was defaced with a blue crown and the letters "RIP" shortly after his death in 2017, and Prince's likeness was drawn on a blank star after his death in 2016; the Chamber allowed the latter to remain for more than a week so people could use it to mourn.

== Influence ==
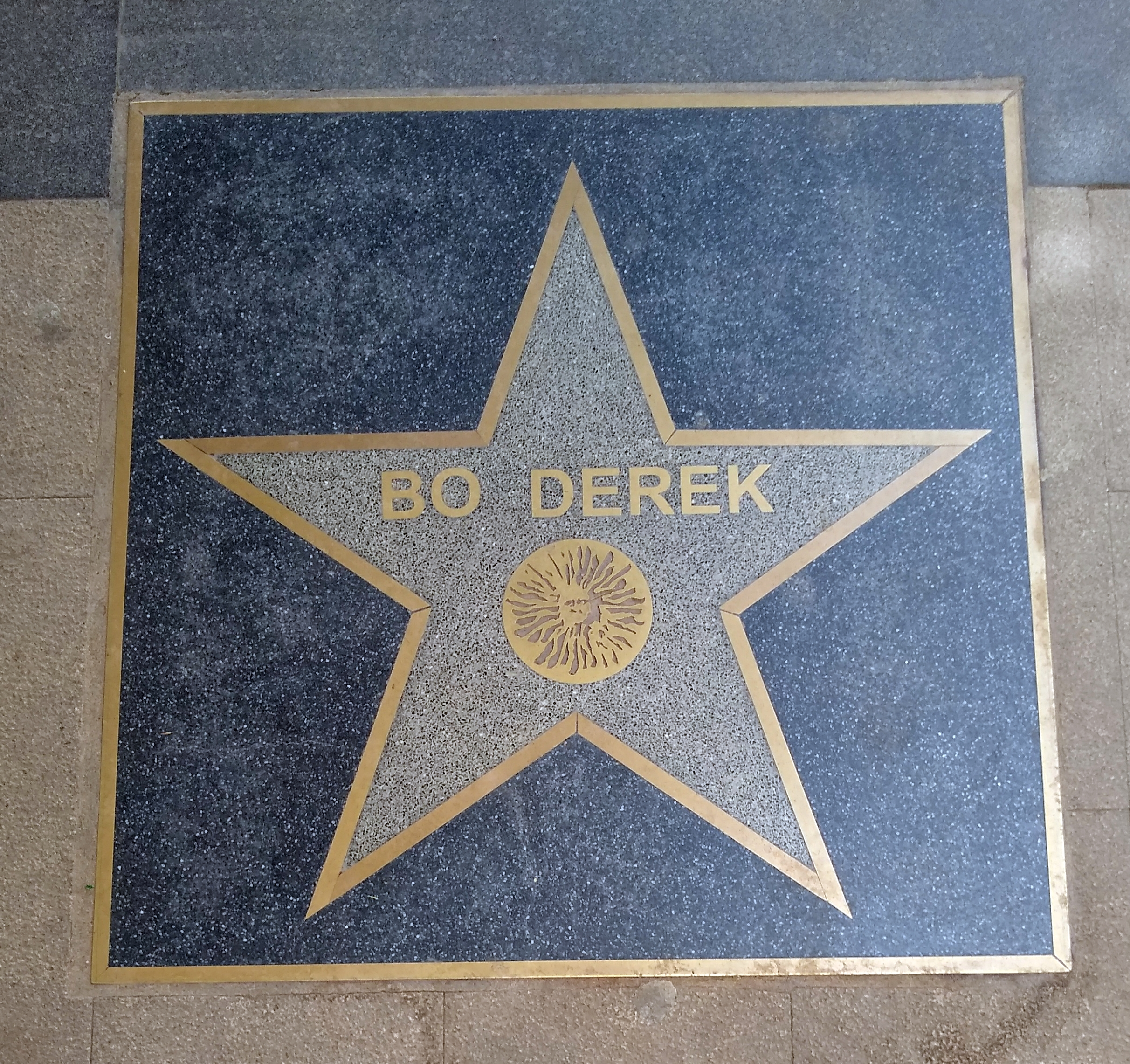
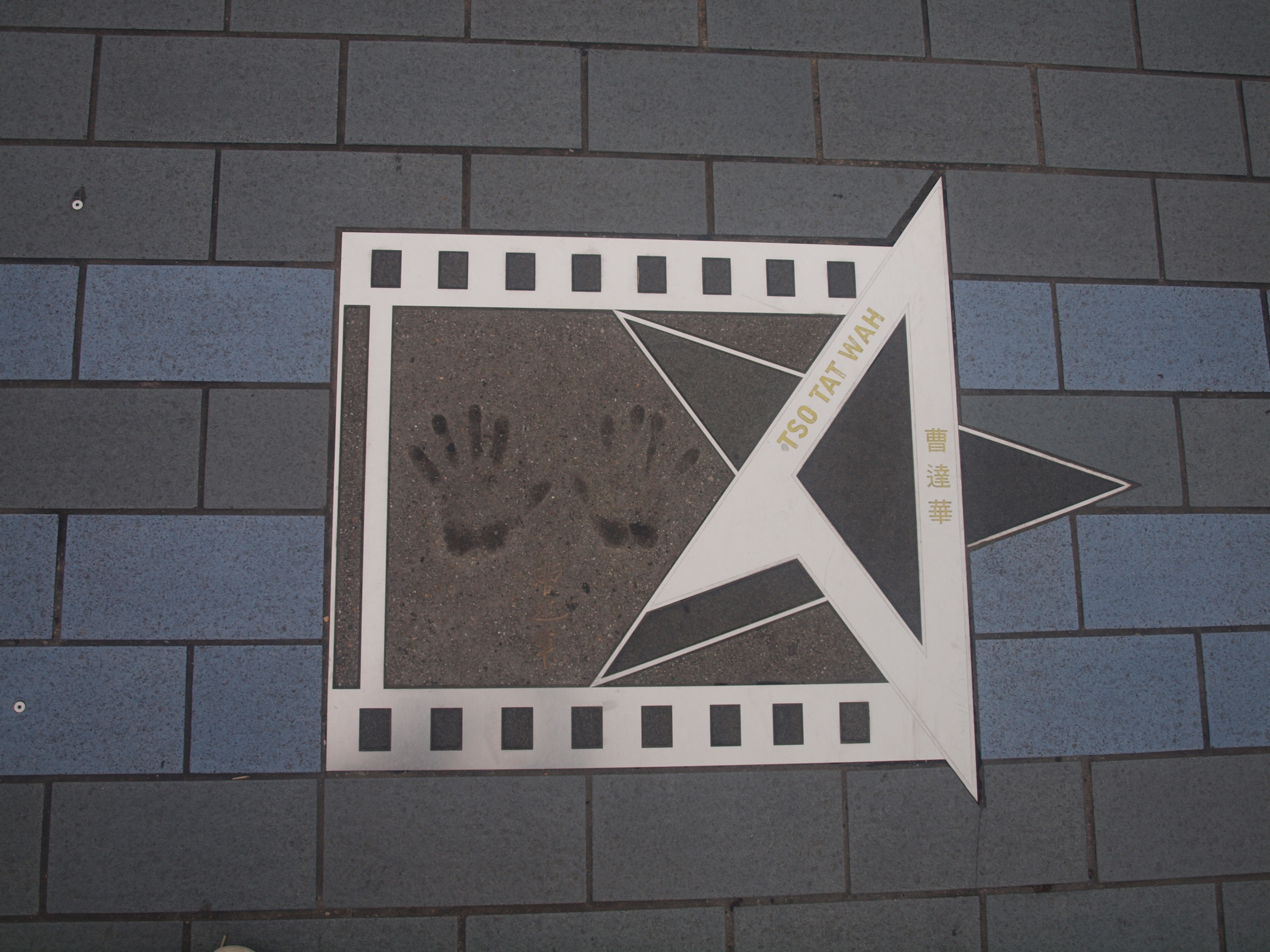
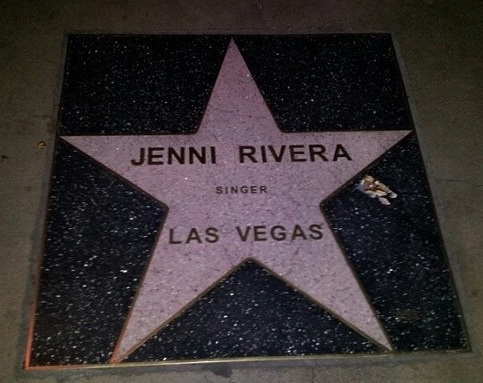
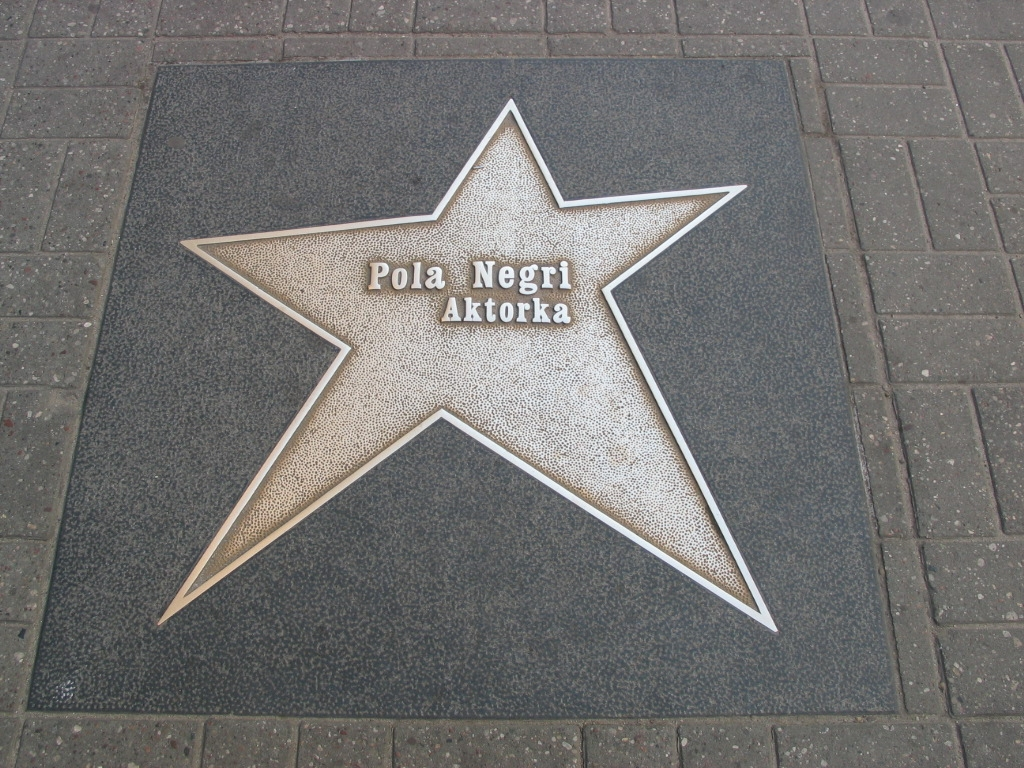
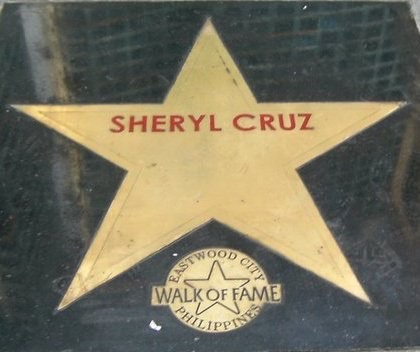
Stars in (left to right, top to bottom): Almeria, Berlin, Hong Kong, Las Vegas, Łódź, and Quezon City

The Hollywood Walk of Fame has inspired walks throughout the world. Other walks that either cite Hollywood's as their inspiration or claim to be their country's equivalent to Hollywood's include those in Almeria; Berlin; Cambridge, Massachusetts; Hong Kong; Las Vegas, Nevada; Łódź; London; Mexico City; Mumbai; Quezon City; Sydney; Wembley; and many more. Los Angeles alone has several walks inspired by Hollywood's and elsewhere in California, the creators of San Francisco's Rainbow Honor Walk and Walk of Game have both cited the Hollywood Walk of Fame as their inspiration.

The Walk has also influenced protestors, not just in Hollywood, but elsewhere. Examples include a 2020 protest in Mumbai, India, and a 2026 Jeffrey Epstein protest in Washington, D.C.

=== In media ===
Notable films that feature the Hollywood Walk of Fame include Pretty Woman, where streetwalkers use the names on several stars to describe where they streetwalk; The Substance, which begins and ends on the main character's fictional star; Harry and Tonto, where the titular characters are picked up at the Walk; Inland Empire, where the main character vomits blood on the Walk; and The Fanatic, where the main character is a busker on the Walk. Jimmy Kimmel Live! has done skits on the Walk, including having Mark Hamill pretend to remove Jimmy Kimmel's star to make room for his own and having Hamill stand beside his star to see if anyone would recognize him. The music video for Miley Cyrus's "Walk of Fame" features the Walk, The Kinks's Celluloid Heroes was inspired by and also mentions the Walk, and Sofie Royer has a song titled "Hollywood Walk of Fame". Street photographer Garry Winogrand has also featured the Walk of Fame in his work.

== See also ==
- History of Hollywood
- Hollywood Boulevard Commercial and Entertainment District
- List of Grauman's Chinese Theatre handprint ceremonies
