= Mayor of Hollywood =

Honorary position

The mayor of Hollywood was an honorary position in Hollywood appointed by the Hollywood Chamber of Commerce. The office primarily served as the master of ceremonies of the award ceremonies for new plaques on the Hollywood Walk of Fame, which is administered by the Chamber, along with other community events. The position otherwise had no political authority due to Hollywood being a neighborhood within the City of Los Angeles, and is thus instead served by the Mayor of Los Angeles.

== History ==
The position was created to promote show business events in Hollywood. The legal mayor of the area is the mayor of Los Angeles, because Hollywood is a district of Los Angeles, California. The unpaid position was previously elected by the Kiwanis Club of Hollywood.

The office has been vacant since the death of Johnny Grant on January 9, 2008. Among those lobbying for the job were Max Worthington, Gary Owens, and Angelyne. The fictional character Chip Gardner, portrayed by Andy Daly on the Comedy Bang! Bang! podcast and TV show, lobbied for the position.

== List of past mayors ==
No.	Image	Name	Years served	Ref.
1		John B. Kingsley	1942–1952	
2		Barbara Britton	1952–1953	
3		Jack Bailey	1953–1955	
4		Betty White	1955–1956	
5		Ben Hunter	1956–1957	
6		Art Linkletter	1957–1958	
7		Lawrence Welk	1958–1962	
8		Charlton Heston	1962–1963	
9		Steve Allen	1963–1972	
10		Lawrence Welk	1972–1975	
11		Monty Hall	1975–1980	
12		Johnny Grant	1980–2008	
