= Johnny Grant (radio personality) =

American television producer (1923–2008)

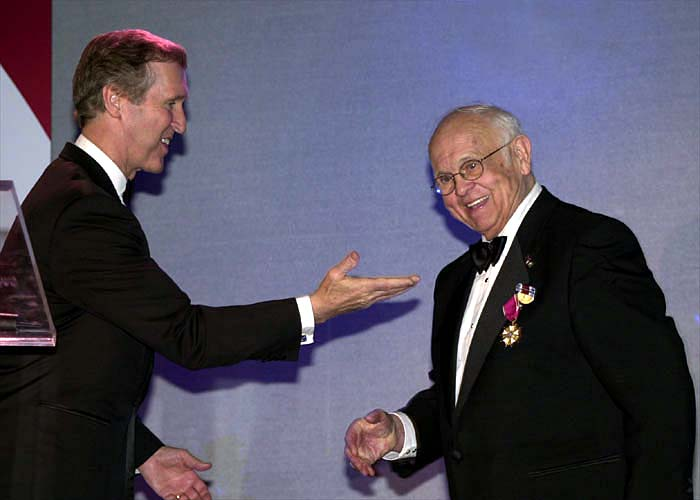
- Johnny Grant (right) with U.S. Defense Secretary William Cohen (left), 2000
- Born: May 9, 1923; Goldsboro, North Carolina, U.S.
- Died: January 9, 2008 (aged 84); Los Angeles, California, U.S.
- Occupations: Radio personality Television producer
- Years active: 1939–2008
- Title: 13th Honorary Mayor of Hollywood

Johnny Grant (May 9, 1923 – January 9, 2008) was an American radio personality and television producer who also served as the honorary mayor of Hollywood, in which capacity he was often present at Hollywood community functions, including the unveiling of new stars on the Hollywood Walk of Fame. An intersection just north of Hollywood Boulevard and Highland Avenue is designated "Johnny Grant Way".

== Early life and career ==
Grant was born in Goldsboro, North Carolina. He made his show business debut on the radio in 1939 as a local newscaster there. According to publicity released by the third annual Hollywood Film Festival in 1999:

He received national recognition for his unprecedented coverage of North Carolina's Irby Holmes murder trial. Mr. Grant convinced the judge to allow him to stand in the courtroom doorway and broadcast live periodic reports of the progress in the trial. According to court and station officials, this was the first time that a live microphone had been allowed in a courtroom. The defendant, a part-time preacher, was convicted of murder and sentenced to death. He asked the judge for permission to preach a final sermon and was refused, but he was allowed to write his sermon and Mr. Grant delivered it on the air.

After World War II, Grant moved to California and appeared as a disc jockey on Los Angeles area radio stations KGIL (1949–50) and KMPC (1951–59). Along with Bing Crosby, Bob Hope and Frank Sinatra, Grant co-hosted the first national telethon ever produced, a fundraiser to help send America's athletes to the Helsinki Olympics in 1952. In the 1950s, he appeared in several films, often portraying uncredited fictional hosts. He played "Ed Harrison", an Ed Sullivan-type TV-show host, in the 1954 film White Christmas, and the Master of Ceremonies in the 1956 film The Girl Can't Help It. Grant also won two Emmy Awards. He appears in the documentary Confessions of a Superhero, complaining about people who dress as superheroes seeking tips on Hollywood Boulevard.

== Honorary Mayor of Hollywood ==
Grant was named honorary Mayor of Hollywood in 1980 by the Hollywood Chamber of Commerce and held the position for the rest of his life. Grant was recommended for the position by the previous mayor of Hollywood, Monty Hall, the host of the hit game show Let's Make a Deal. Grant claimed that his mission in life was bringing the Hollywood story to everyone. He played host to red-carpet arrivals at the Oscars, appeared in bit parts in movies and produced the annual Hollywood Christmas Parade. Grant said of all his accomplishments in Hollywood, he was most proud of three things: the Hollywood sign, the Walk of Fame and the Hollywood postmark. "We're not supposed to have one because we're not our own city," he said. "But I got it."

== Accomplishments ==
Grant arranged for stars from Hollywood to visit wounded veterans of the Vietnam War at places such as San Antonio's Brooke Army Medical Center, including such actors as the late Christopher George. Grant was also a retired major general in the California State Military Reserve, a volunteer backup and support force of the California National Guard. He had been chairman of the Los Angeles City Fire Commission, the Los Angeles County Social Service Commission, and the Burbank, California Police Commission. More recently, he had been a member of the Los Angeles City Cultural Heritage Commission.

For contributions to the television industry, Johnny Grant was honored with a star on the Hollywood Walk of Fame at 6937 Hollywood Boulevard, and a second one for contributions to the Hollywood community at 6897 Hollywood Boulevard. The building at 7024 W. Hollywood Boulevard was also renamed Johnny Grant Building to further honor him.

Grant was inducted into the North Carolina Music Hall of Fame in 2009.

== Death ==
On January 9, 2008, Grant was not feeling well when he had lunch with Ana Martínez-Holler, a spokeswoman for the Hollywood Chamber of Commerce. Later that afternoon he relayed the same to his business manager, Jim Harper, stating he felt "lousy". Later that evening, Grant was found unconscious in his bed, in a 14th-floor suite he lived in at the Roosevelt Hotel, by an associate. He was the only full-time guest at the hotel.

Paramedics were called, but Grant was eventually pronounced dead after they arrived, apparently of natural causes, at the age of 84.

On January 11, 2008, Grant's sister, Peggy G. Adams of Goldsboro, North Carolina, announced that Johnny did not want a funeral service. Instead, there was a private memorial service held at the Pantages Theatre in Hollywood, California. Various publications reported that Grant wished for cremation, and for his ashes to be scattered under the Hollywood Sign. The Hollywood Chamber of Commerce has not set a timetable to name one or more persons to succeed Grant as mayor. Gary Owens was among those interested in the post, and he claimed that Grant tapped him as his successor. However, Owens died in early 2015.

After his death, Hollywood Chamber of Commerce President and CEO Leron Gubler replaced Grant as the new MC of unveiling new stars on the Hollywood Walk of Fame.
