= Hanging In =

American sitcom television series

- Genre: Sitcom
- Written by: Bill Davenport; Charlie Hauck; Arthur Julian; Sy Rosen; Rod Parker
- Directed by: Alan Rafkin; Walter C. Miller (series finale)
- Starring: Bill Macy; Barbara Rhoades; Dennis Burkley; Nedra Volz
- Theme music composer: Billy Byers
- Country of origin: United States
- Original language: English
- No. of seasons: 1
- No. of episodes: 4

Production
- Executive producers: Norman Lear; Sy Rosen
- Producer: Ken Stump
- Running time: 22–24 minutes
- Production company: T.A.T. Communications Company

Original release
- Network: CBS
- Release: August 8 – August 29, 1979

Related
- Mr. Dugan

Hanging In is an American sitcom television series that aired for four episodes on CBS on Wednesday nights from August 8, 1979, to August 29, 1979.

== Summary ==
After his failed attempt to launch the sitcom Mr. Dugan, Norman Lear reworked the project, finally coming up with Hanging In, the story of Lou Harper, a former professional football star who becomes president of fictional Braddock University. Bill Macy (who had played Maude's husband, Walter Findlay, in Maude) resurfaced as the star of the version that finally did air, in August 1979.

Most of the supporting cast of Mr. Dugan and its four different incarnations (including the final three episodes of Maude and the unsold pilot Onward and Upward, which featured Good Times star John Amos) also appeared in Hanging In. As The Complete Directory to Prime Time Network and Cable TV Shows 1946–Present by Tim Brooks and Earle Marsh dryly put it, the actors "must have known their lines pretty well by the time they got to Hanging In", as the scripts on each project were nearly identical.

In the end, Hanging In lasted just four weeks on CBS, leaving the air after its August 29, 1979 broadcast.

== Cast ==
- Bill Macy as Louis "Lou" G. Harper
- Barbara Rhoades as Maggie Gallagher
- Dennis Burkley as Sam Dickey
- Nedra Volz as Pinky Nolan
- Darian Mathias as Rita Zefferelli

== Episodes ==
No.	Title	Directed by	Written by	Original release date
1	"New Man on Campus"	Alan Rafkin	Story by : Rod Parker; Teleplay by : Charlie Hauck, Bill Davenport & Arthur Julian	August 8, 1979
A new university president has inherited an office from his predecessor and waiting for him is Maggie Gallagher, the high pressured Dean of Faculty; Sam Dickey, the glib Director of Development; and Pinky, a wise-cracking housekeeper—all itching to give this idealistic greenhorn the benefit of their academic savvy.
2	"Old Girlfriend"	Alan Rafkin	Sy Rosen	August 15, 1979
The unexpected visit of an ex-girlfriend drives Sam to an attack of compulsive eating.
3	"Lou's Little Problem"	Alan Rafkin	Bill Davenport	August 22, 1979
Lou pays a pretty price for his snobbish attitude about women while at a gala fund-raising dinner—as TV-news cameras roll.
4	"Sleep with the Fishes"	Walter C. Miller	Arthur Julian & Sy Rosen	August 29, 1979
Menacing phone calls on a dark and stormy night suggest to Lou and staff that a mob boss wants revenge because his son was refused admission to the school.
