= Arthur Julian =

American actor

- Julian in That Girl, 1968
- Born: March 7, 1923; Memphis, Tennessee, U.S.
- Died: January 30, 1995 (aged 71); Westwood, Los Angeles, California, U.S.
- Occupations: Actor, producer, writer
- Years active: 1954–1981 (as writer); 1963–1986 (as producer); 1965–1968 (as actor)

Arthur Julian (March 7, 1923 – January 30, 1995) was an American actor, producer and television writer.

Some of Julian's production credits include the television shows Vacation Playhouse, Gimme a Break!, and Amen. Julian also served on the writing staff of the television shows Meet Millie, F Troop, Bewitched, Hogan's Heroes, and The Doris Day Show.

== Filmography ==
- How to Stuff a Wild Bikini (1965) (Dr. Melamed)
- Bewitched (1966–1968; 5 episodes)
- F Troop (episode 2.15: "Survival of the Fittest", December 15, 1966) (The Undertaker)
- The Flying Nun (episode 1.11: "It's an Ill Wind", November 16, 1967) (Moon)
- That Girl (1968–1969; 4 episodes)

=== Producer ===
- Vacation Playhouse (1963–1966)
- Love Thy Neighbor (1973)
- Gimme a Break! (1983–1987; 96 episodes)
- Amen (1987–1990; 65 episodes)

=== Writer ===
- Meet Millie (1952–1956; 10 episodes)
- Ford Theatre (1955; 1 episode)
- Schlitz Playhouse of Stars (1957; 1 episode)
- The Happy Road (1957)
- December Bride (1957–1959; 7 episodes)
- The Real McCoys (1958; 1 episode)
- NBC Sunday Showcase (1959; 1 episode)
- Guestward, Ho! (1960–1961; 3 episodes)
- Glynis (1963; 2 episodes)
- The Baileys of Balboa (1964; 1 episode)
- Vacation Playhouse (1966; 1 episode)
- F Troop (1965–1967; 30 episodes)
- Hogan's Heroes (1965–1971; 30 episodes)
- I Dream of Jeannie (1968; 1 episode)
- That Girl (1968; 3 episodes)
- Bewitched (1968; 1 episode)
- The Flying Nun (1968–1969; 3 episodes)
- The Queen & I (1969; 5 episodes)
- The Boatniks (1970)
- The Carol Burnett Show (1970–1971; 25 episodes)
- The Chicago Teddy Bears (1971; 2 episodes)
- The Odd Couple (1971; 2 episodes)
- Don Rickles: Alive and Kicking (1972; TV movie)
- Temperatures Rising (1973; 2 episodes)
- The Doris Day Show (1973; 16 episodes)
- Love Thy Neighbor (1973; all episodes)
- Wait Till Your Father Gets Home (1973; 1 episode)
- Happy Anniversary and Goodbye (1974; TV movie)
- M*A*S*H (1975; 1 episode)
- The Rear Guard (1976 pilot episode)
- Maude (1976–1978; 17 episodes)
- Apple Pie (1978; 2 episodes)
- The Wonderful World of Disney (1978; 1 episode)
- Hanging In (1979; 2 episodes)
- The Two of Us (1981; 6 episodes)
- Love, Sidney (1983; 2 episodes)
- At Ease (1983; 5 episodes)
- Gimme a Break! (1983–1987; 33 episodes)
- Mr. President (1987; 1 episode)
- Amen (1987–1990; 23 episodes)
