= David Hume Kennerly =

American photographer

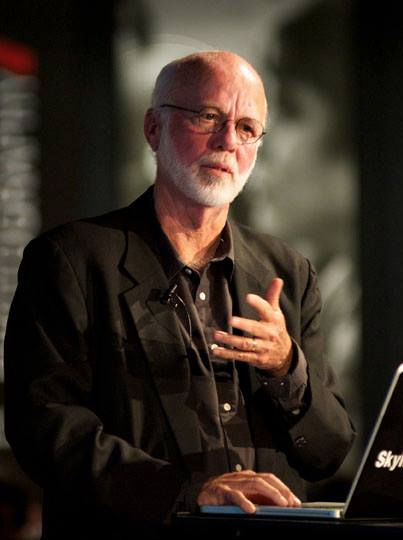
- Kennerly in 2013

Chief Official White House Photographer
- In office August 10, 1974 – January 20, 1977
- President: Gerald Ford
- Preceded by: Oliver F. Atkins
- Succeeded by: Michael Evans (1981)

Personal details
- Born: March 9, 1947 (age 79) Roseburg, Oregon, U.S.
- Spouses: Susan Allwardt (m. 1967; div. 1969); Mel Harris (m. 1983; div. 1988); Carol Huston (m. 1989; div. 1992); Rebecca Soladay (m. 1994)
- Children: 3
- Education: West Linn High School
- Occupation: Journalist, photographer, producer
- Website: kennerly.com

David Hume Kennerly (born March 9, 1947) is an American photographer. He won the 1972 Pulitzer Prize for Feature Photography for his portfolio of photographs of the Vietnam War, Cambodia, East Pakistani refugees near Calcutta, and the Ali-Frazier fight in Madison Square Garden. He has photographed every American president since Lyndon B Johnson. He is the first presidential scholar at the University of Arizona.

== Early life ==
Kennerly is the son of O.A. "Tunney" Kennerly, a traveling salesman, and Joanne (Hume) Kennerly. He has three younger sisters.

His interest in photography started when he was only 12, and his career began in Roseburg, where his first published picture was in the high school newspaper The Orange 'R in 1962.

Kennerly graduated from West Linn High School in West Linn, Oregon, in 1965. He briefly attended Portland State College but left at 19 to become a staff photographer for The Oregon Journal. In 1967 he entered the Oregon National Guard and was sent to Fort Leonard Wood, Missouri, for basic training and then advanced training at Fort Benjamin Harrison, Indiana. After completing six months of active duty in the US Army, he was hired as staff photographer by The Oregonian.

During his early career in Portland he photographed some major personalities, including Miles Davis, Igor Stravinsky, Senator Robert F. Kennedy, the Rolling Stones, and the Supremes. The encounter with Senator Kennedy gave him the determination to become a national political photographer.

== Professional life ==
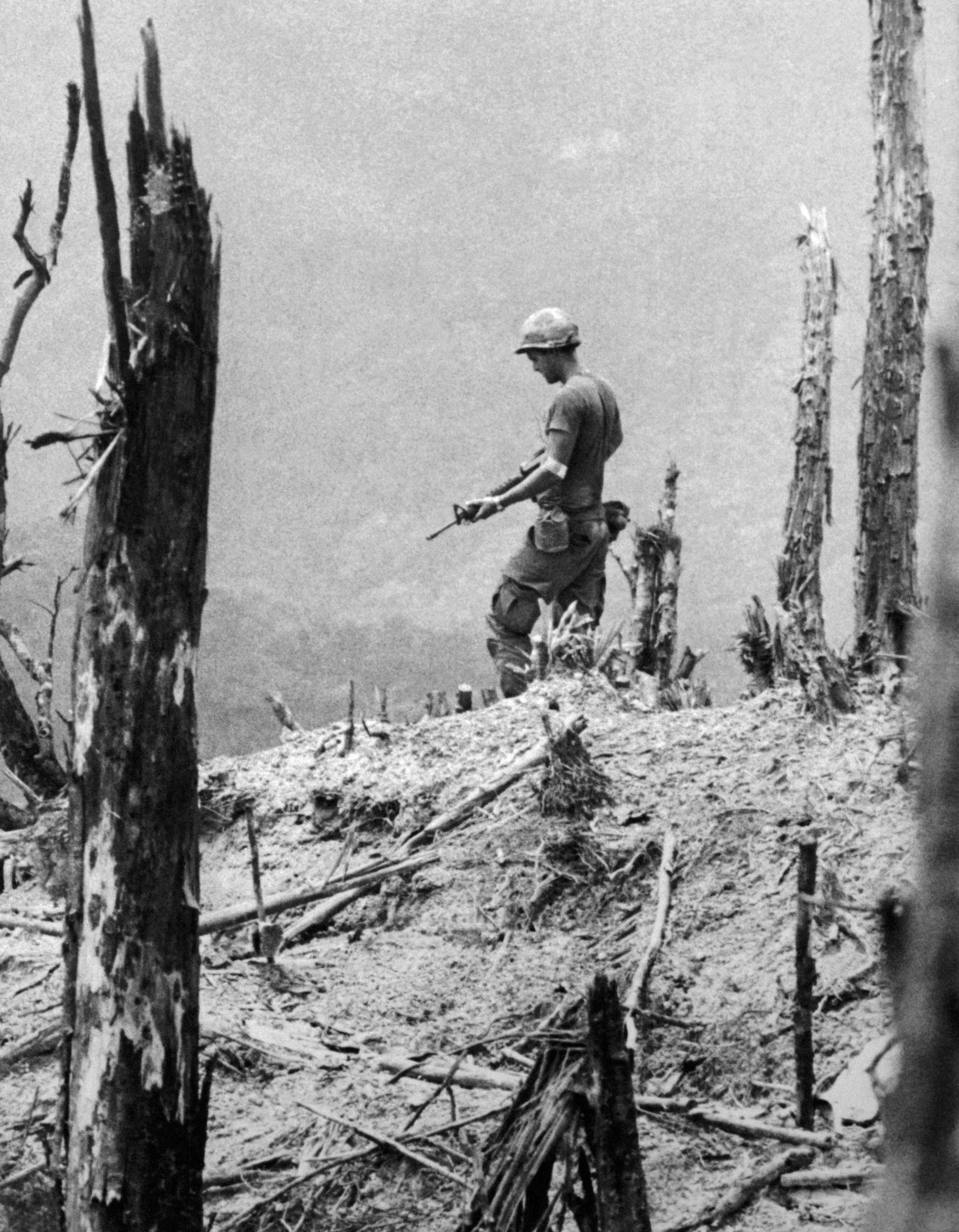
A lone American soldier makes his way across a hillside near Firebase Gladiator on the rim of the A Shau Valley, 1972 Pulitzer Prize for Feature Photography.

In late 1967, he moved to Los Angeles to become a staff photographer for United Press International (UPI). On June 5, 1968, he took some of the last photos of Senator Robert F. Kennedy at the Ambassador Hotel as he declared victory in the California presidential primary. Moments later Kennedy was gunned down by the assassin Sirhan Sirhan. That night Kennerly also took a picture of Ethel Kennedy in the back of an ambulance.

The following year (1969), Kennerly moved to New York for UPI, where among many other assignments he photographed the "Miracle" New York Mets winning the 1969 World Series. In early 1970, he was transferred to the Washington, D.C. bureau of UPI. At age 23 he took his first ride on Air Force One with President Nixon as a member of the traveling press pool. However, Kennerly believed he was missing out on the biggest story of his generation, the Vietnam War. He said, "I felt like that scene in Mr. Roberts where Henry Fonda, an officer on a supply ship, watched the destroyers sail into battle while he was stuck in some South Pacific backwater port."

Kennerly was sent to Saigon in early 1971 as a combat photographer for UPI. Unbeknownst to Kennerly, UPI photo editor Larry DeSantis started a portfolio of his favorite Kennerly photographs of the year, beginning with the Ali-Frazier fight photo that ran on the front page of The New York Times on March 9, 1971. DeSantis submitted that photograph along with images of the Vietnam and Cambodia wars and refugees escaping from East Pakistan into India to the Pulitzer Prize Board for consideration. It was only when the winners were announced that Kennerly, who was still in Vietnam, learned he had been awarded the 1972 Pulitzer Prize for Feature Photography. The committee noted that he "specialized in pictures that capture the loneliness and desolation of war."

Kennerly became the photo bureau chief for UPI in Southeast Asia, but still spent most of his time in the field covering combat operations. In September 1972, he was one of three Americans to travel to the People's Republic of China to cover the state visit of Japanese Prime Minister Kakuei Tanaka.

While still in Vietnam, he joined Life in November 1972 as a contract photographer. After the classic picture magazine folded a few weeks later, Kennerly stayed on as a contract photographer for Time. Among the many stories he covered for them while still in Asia was the last American prisoner of war release in Hanoi, March 30, 1973.

Kennerly returned to the United States in the summer of 1973 for Time, right in the middle of the Watergate story. He photographed the resignation of Vice President Spiro Agnew, and the selection of Minority Leader Gerald R. Ford (R-MI) as Agnew's replacement. Kennerly's first Time cover was of Congressman Ford, a photo he took the day before Nixon selected Ford, and it was also Ford's first appearance on the front of Time. That session with Ford led to a close personal relationship with him and his family. After Nixon resigned the presidency on August 9, 1974, the new president selected him to be his Chief Official White House Photographer. Kennerly was only the third civilian to ever have that position (before him was President Lyndon B. Johnson's photographer Yoichi Okamoto, and Nixon's photographer Oliver F. Atkins).

Kennerly photographed major meetings, events, and trips during Ford's tenure in office. He also arranged unique access for photographic colleagues from the magazines, newspapers, and wire service during that period. More than 50 photographers were granted exclusives with President Ford. His staff consisted of four other photographers who divided coverage of the First Lady and Vice President, as well as presidential duties. He also directed the White House photo lab that was run by the military as part of the White House Communications Agency. Kennerly's White House photographs and negatives are physically housed at the Gerald R. Ford Presidential Library in Ann Arbor, Michigan, on the campus of Ford's alma mater, the University of Michigan. Many of his photos are also on display at the Gerald R. Ford Presidential Museum in Grand Rapids, Michigan.

In late March 1975, Kennerly accompanied U.S. Army Chief of Staff General Frederick Weyand who had been dispatched on a presidential mission to South Vietnam to assess what was becoming a rapidly deteriorating military situation. The president privately told Kennerly he wanted his view of what was happening.

In his autobiography Ford wrote, "I knew David wouldn't try to give me any propaganda about 'enemy body counts' or 'light at the end of the tunnel.' He had been shot at many times by the North Vietnamese. As an American, he felt ashamed that we weren't doing more to help a loyal ally, and he thought that once I saw the photographs he took of the suffering there, I would have a better feel for what we had to do." Kennerly flew around the country, escaped from Nha Trang before it fell to the advancing communists, was shot at by retreating South Vietnamese soldiers at Cam Ranh Bay, and landed under fire in Phnom Penh, Cambodia, for a quick visit and assessment of the situation. When he returned from the trip, both Weyand's and Kennerly's assessments were bleak. The president ordered that Kennerly's stark black-and-white photos of the tragedy be put up in the halls of the West Wing of the White House to remind the staff just how bad things were. Saigon fell a month later. Before the fall, Ford had ordered the evacuation of the last Americans and many Vietnamese who had been working for the United States. The photos that Kennerly took on that mission helped convince Ford to open the doors to allow tens of thousands of other Vietnamese refugees into the country.

The day before the Fords were turning over the keys to the White House to incoming president Jimmy Carter, Kennerly accompanied Betty Ford around the West Wing as she said goodbyes to the staff. They walked by the empty Cabinet Room and a mischievous look came across her face. "I've always wanted to dance on the Cabinet Room table", she said. The former Martha Graham dancer kicked off her shoes, jumped up on the middle of the table, and struck a pose. The photo was published for the first time 15 years after Kennerly took it in his book Photo Op.

During the Carter presidency there was no official White House photographer, in part because Carter did not like Kennerly's high public profile during Ford's administration.

After the White House, Kennerly went back on contract for Time magazine, where he covered some of the biggest stories of the 1970s and 1980s for them; Egyptian President Anwar Sadat's trip to Israel, the horror of Jonestown, exclusive photos of President Ronald Reagan and Soviet General Secretary Mikhail Gorbachev's first meeting in Geneva in 1985, the Fireside Summit, and many other stories around the world. When Life made a brief comeback for Desert Storm in 1991, he shot an inside story on Secretary of Defense Dick Cheney and Chairman of the Joint Chiefs of Staff Colin Powell called "Men of War".

In 1996, Kennerly became a contributing editor for Newsweek where he produced inside stories on President Bill Clinton, Senator Bob Dole, the impeachment hearings, special prosecutor Kenneth Starr, the 2000 elections, the 9/11 attacks on the Pentagon, and other top stories. Kennerly also had a contract with John F. Kennedy Jr.'s magazine George.

While still working for Newsweek, Kennerly was assigned to cover the 2000 presidential election campaigns, initially covering the candidacy of Senator John McCain until his withdrawal on March 9, 2000. On election night November 7, Kennerly was at the Governor's Mansion in Austin with Governor George W. Bush after Vice President Al Gore first conceded the election and later recanted. Kennerly has covered every presidential campaign from 1968 through 2020 with the exception of 1972, when he was in Vietnam.

Throughout his journalism career, Kennerly has photographed more than 35 covers for Time and Newsweek, and covered assignments in over 130 countries.

Kennerly was a fellow in the American Film Institute directing program from 1984 to 1986. He was nominated for a Primetime Emmy as executive producer of NBC's The Taking of Flight 847, and was the writer and executive producer of a two-hour NBC pilot, Shooter, starring Helen Hunt, based on his Vietnam experiences. Shooter won the Emmy for Outstanding Cinematography. He was executive producer of the Academy Award short-listed documentary Portraits of a Lady for HBO, directed by Neil Leifer and starring former Justice of the Supreme Court Sandra Day O'Connor.

In 2013, Kennerly collaborated with Emmy Award-winning filmmakers Gedeon Naudet, Jules Naudet, and producer Chris Whipple on a documentary The Presidents' Gatekeepers, a four-hour Discovery Channel documentary about the White House chiefs of staff. The team joined forces again in 2015 to produce The Spymasters, a documentary for CBS/Showtime about the directors of the CIA.

In 2016, Kennerly covered the presidential election for CNN, and took an exclusive of President-elect Donald Trump for the cover of their book Unprecedented. Trump tweeted that it was "the worst cover photo of me!" even though he had told Kennerly he liked it when he saw it in the back of the camera during the shoot.

Kennerly is a frequent public speaker, and has appeared at events such as TEDx, RootsTech, the University of Arizona, and a multitude of corporate events.

In addition to his photojournalism work, Kennerly has also worked as a corporate photographer, and for the last ten years his main client has been Bank of America. In 2010, Kennerly photographed a campaign for the Girl Scouts of the USA that included new images for the outside of the Girl Scout cookie boxes, pictures that endured for more than ten years.

In October 2018, University of Arizona President Robert C. Robbins named Kennerly as the university's first presidential scholar. "The images captured by David Hume Kennerly document some of the most important moments in history over the past 60 years, and they have changed how several generations have viewed the world. We are honored to have David share his experience with our students and community."

The following year, UA's Center for Creative Photography (CCP) announced the acquisition of the David Hume Kennerly Archive, which features more than one million images, prints, objects, memorabilia, correspondence and documents dating back to 1957. In announcing the acquisition CCP director Anne Breckenridge Barrett said "Adding the Kennerly Archive to our collection allows the Center to connect the relevance of Kennerly's work to the photographic legacies we house. It is a critical contribution to the Center's commitment to expanding the understanding of the role photography plays in today's society."

The acquisition highlights the decades long relationship between Kennerly and Ansel Adams, one of the co-founders of CCP. The two first became acquainted when Kennerly invited Adams to the White House to meet with President Ford in 1975. In 1979 Kennerly photographed Adams for the cover of Time, the only time a photographer has been featured on the cover of the magazine.

== Personal life ==
He was married to Susan Allwardt from 1967 to 1969, actress Mel Harris from 1983 to 1988, actress Carol Huston from 1989 to 1992, and Rebecca Soladay from 1994 to the present.

== Accomplishments ==
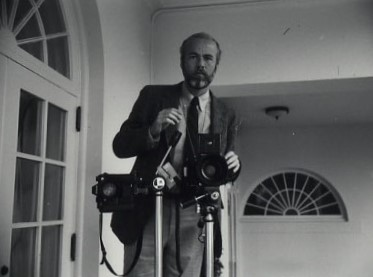
Kennerly at the White House in 1981

- Trustee, Gerald R. Ford Foundation, (2008–2024)
- Contributing editor, NBC News (2006–2008)
- Contributing editor, Der Spiegel (2008)
- Contributing editor, Newsweek (1996–2006)
- Personal photographer to President Gerald R. Ford, (1974–1977)
- National program chair for Washington Mutual's, Home of the Free Student Photojournalism Project
- Contributing correspondent, ABC's Good Morning America Sunday (1996–98)
- Contributing photographer, George (1996–1999)
- Executive producer, Portraits of a Lady, HBO (2011)
- Co-executive producer, Profiles from the Front Line, ABC reality series with Jerry Bruckheimer and Bertram van Munster (2003)
- Executive producer and writer, Shooter, NBC Television movie based on his book about Vietnam combat photographers (1988)
- Executive producer, The Taking of Flight 847, NBC movie (1989)
- American Film Institute directing fellow, 1984–1985
- Contract photographer, Time (1973–1974, 1977–1990)
- Contributing photographer, Life (1972, 1993–1996)
- Staff photographer, United Press International (1967–72)
- Staff photographer, The Oregon Journal (1966–1967)
- Staff photographer, The Oregonian (1967)
- Producer, Discovery Channel's four-hour documentary The Presidents' Gatekeepers about the White House chiefs of staff (2014)
- Executive producer CBS/Showtime documentary The Spymasters: CIA in the Crosshairs (2015)
- Contributing photographer, Politico Magazine (2015-2016)
- Member Canon Explorer of Light program (1995–present)
- Contributing photographer, CNN, 2016 election

== Selected honors and awards ==
- Winner of the Pulitzer Prize for Feature Photography (1972)
- Five prizes in the 2001 and 2003 White House Press Photographer's contest
- Named one of the top 50 top Washington journalists in the March 2001 issue of The Washingtonian, the only photographer on the list
- Photo Media magazine's 2007 Photographer of the Year
- 1997 President's Award for Excellence in Journalism from the Greater Los Angeles Press Club
- 2015 Lucie Award for Achievement in Photojournalism
- 1989 Emmy nomination for Outstanding Drama as executive producer of NBC's The Taking of Flight 847: The Uli Derickson Story
- Overseas Press Club Award for Best Photographic Reporting from Abroad (Olivier Rebbot award), 1986
- 1976 World Press Photo contest (two first place prizes for Cambodian coverage)
- National Press Photographers Association contest (first place)
- Honorary Doctorate, Lake Erie College, 2015
- Named "One of the 100 Most Important People in Photography" by American Photo magazine

=== Selected exhibitions ===
- Extraordinary Circumstances, various locations 2008
- Savannah College of Art and Design, Lacoste France 2007. Retrospective.
- University of Southern California's Annenberg School for Communication 2006–2007.
- University of Texas at Austin - permanent. Photo du Jour exhibition.
- Houston Museum of Fine Arts – 2004. Photo du Jour exhibition.
- Smithsonian Institution's Arts and Industries Building 2002. Photo du Jour exhibition
- New York Historical Society from 2002 - 2003.
- Visa Pour L'Image, Perpignan France. 2000 Retrospective.
- U.S. Capitol, Cannon Building Rotunda. 1995 Photo Op exhibition.
- Portland Art Museum, Portland Oregon. 1995 Photo Op exhibition.
- The Harry Lunn Gallery, 1979
- Moderator – World Press Photo. Moderated conversation among 2006 award winners, USC, 2007
- Guest lecturer - Savannah College of Art and Design, Lacoste France 2007.
- Keynote speaker - Eddie Adams Workshop 2000 – present;

== Works ==
=== Photographs ===
Kennerly's photographs include:

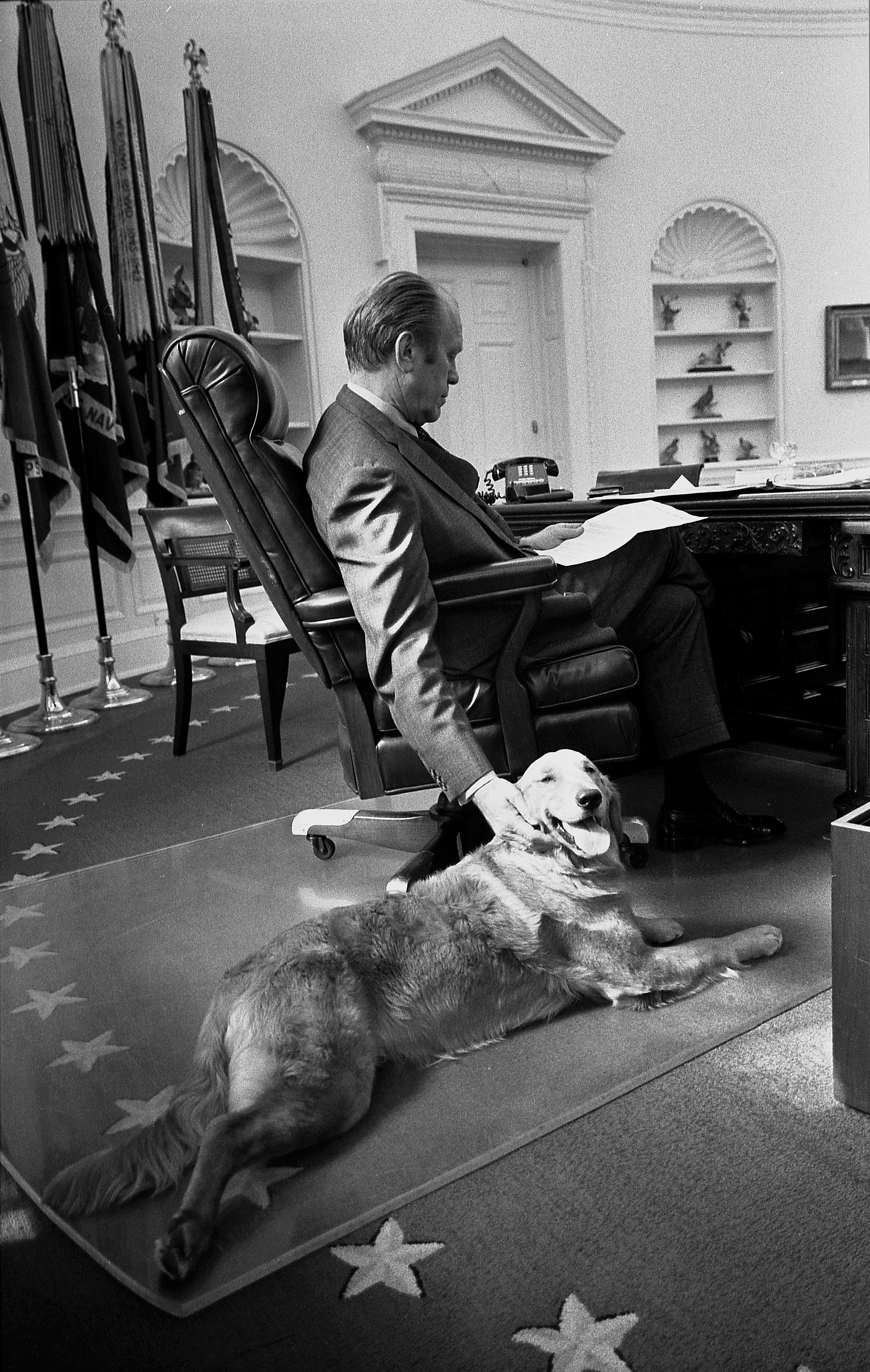
President Ford and his golden retriever Liberty (1974)

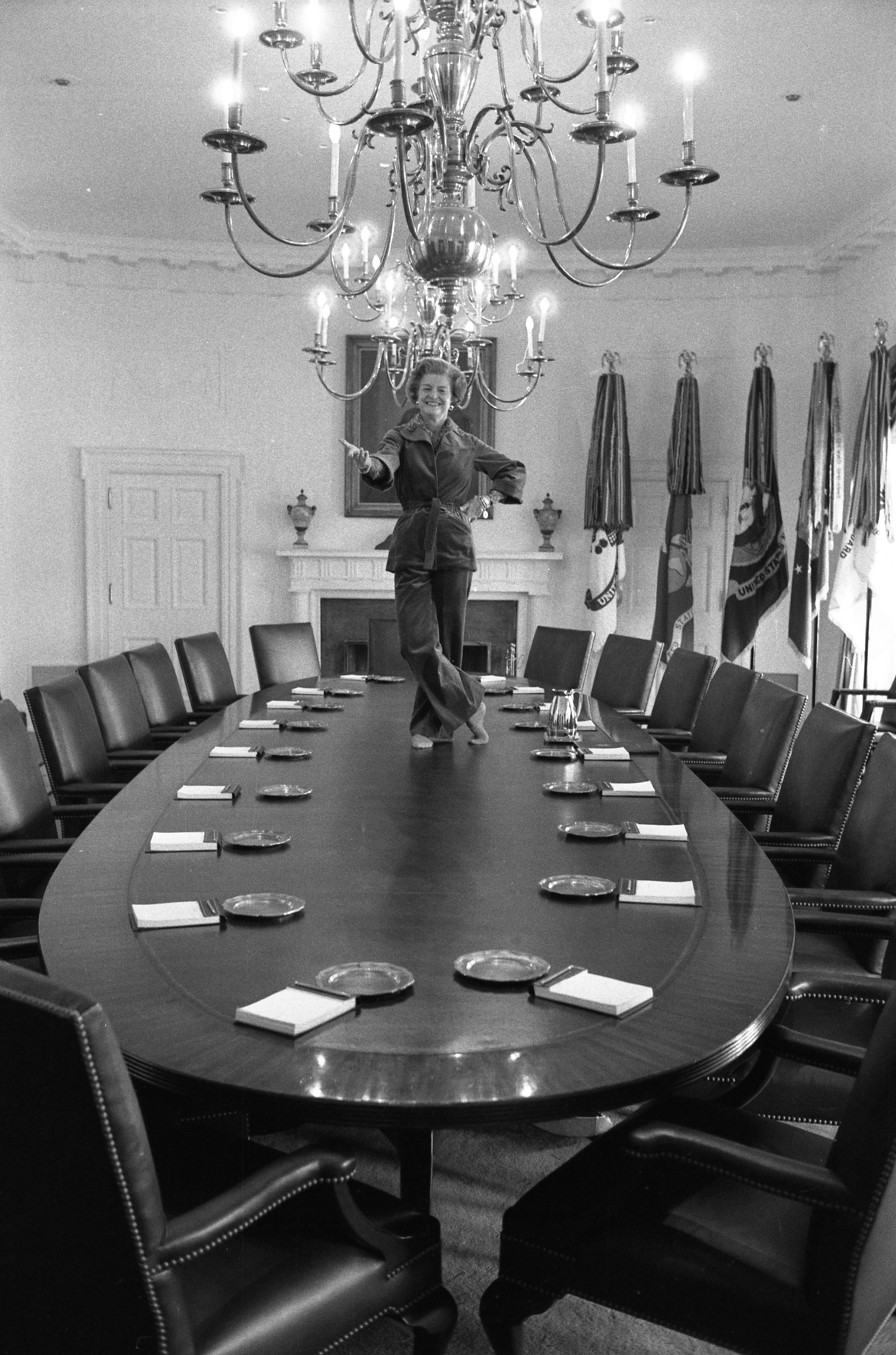
First Lady Betty Ford dances on the Cabinet room table in the White House (1977)

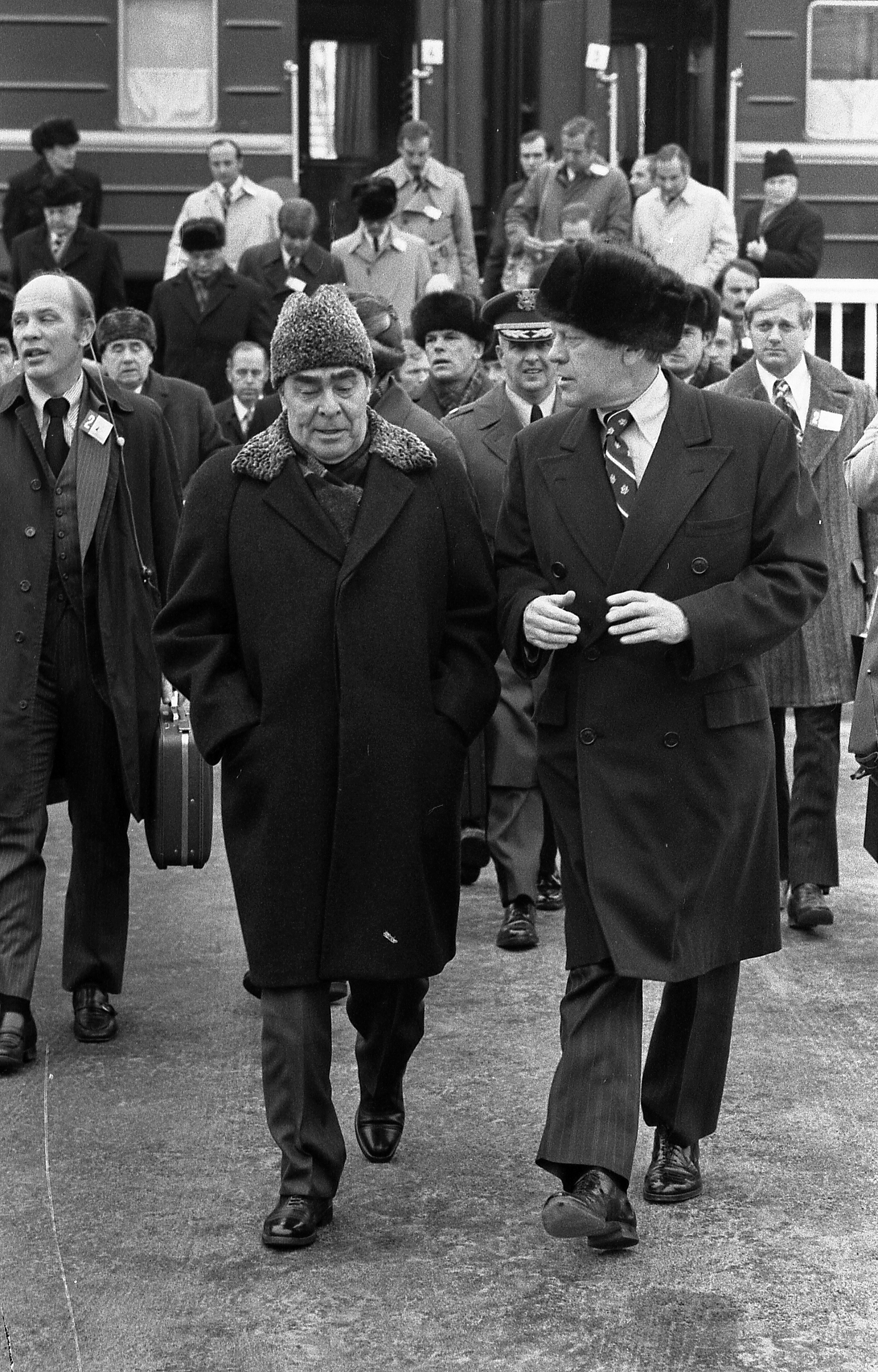
President Ford and Leonid Brezhnev (1974)

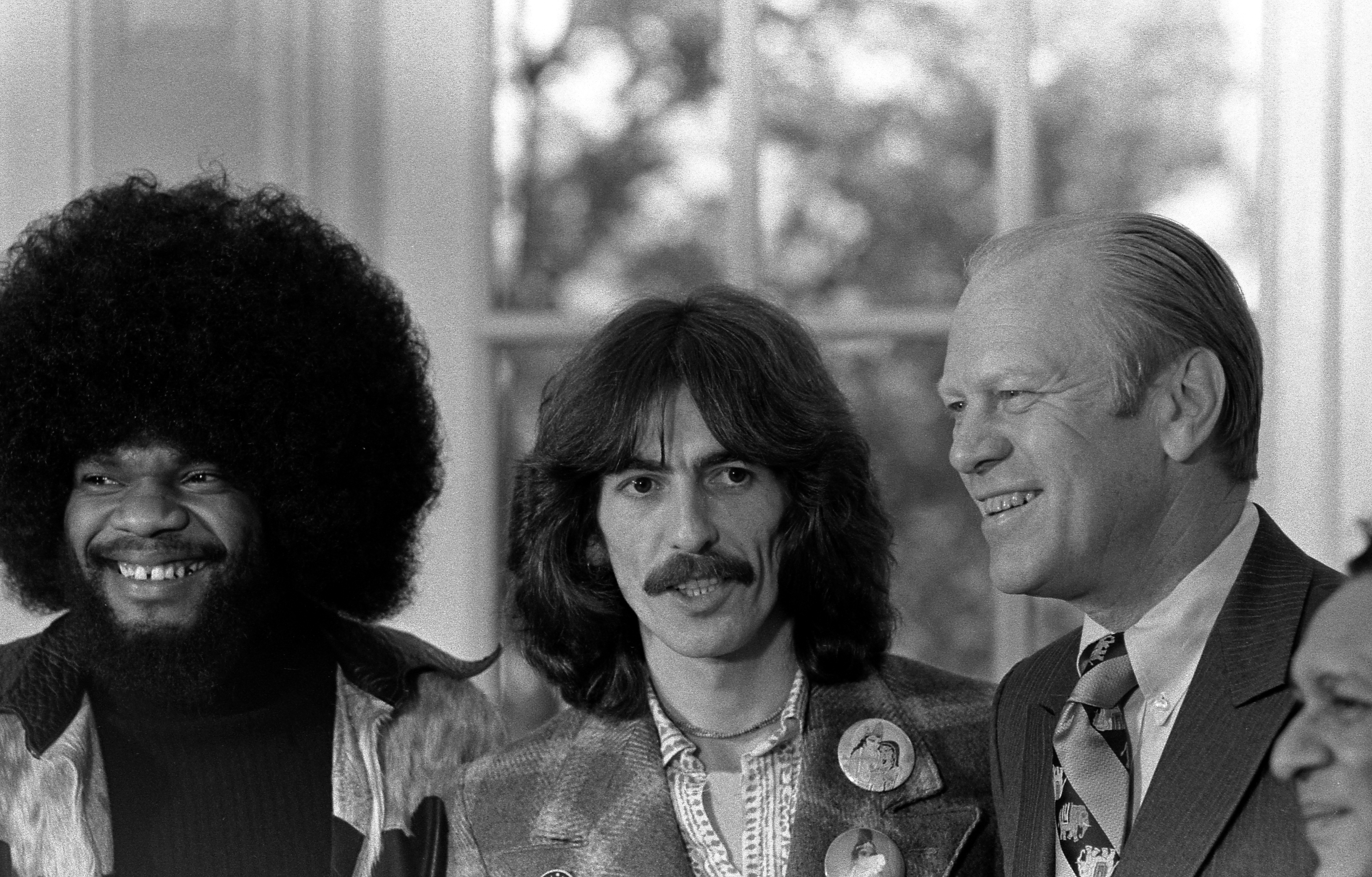
Billy Preston, George Harrison, Gerald Ford, Ravi Shankar (1974)

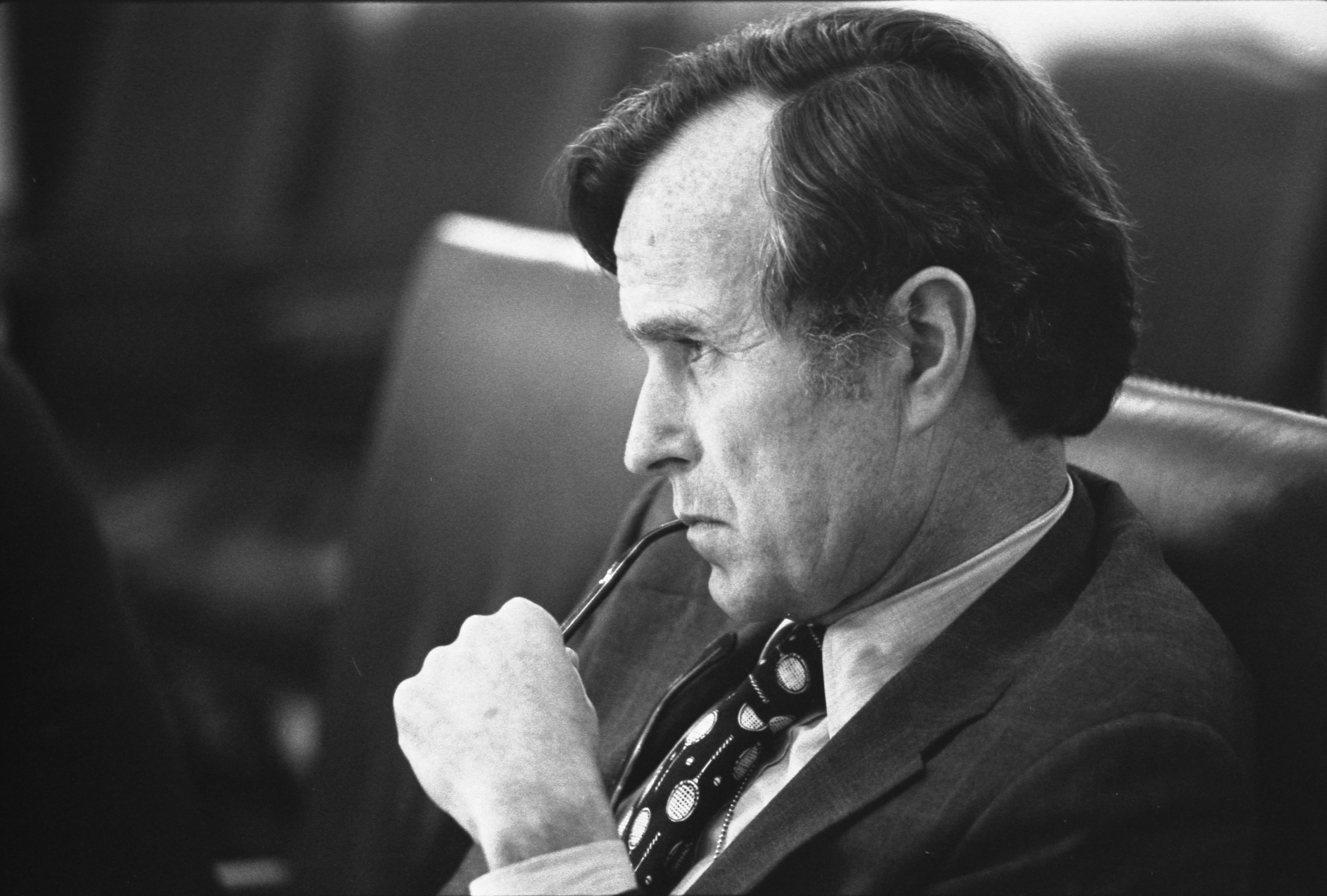
CIA Director George H. W. Bush (1976)

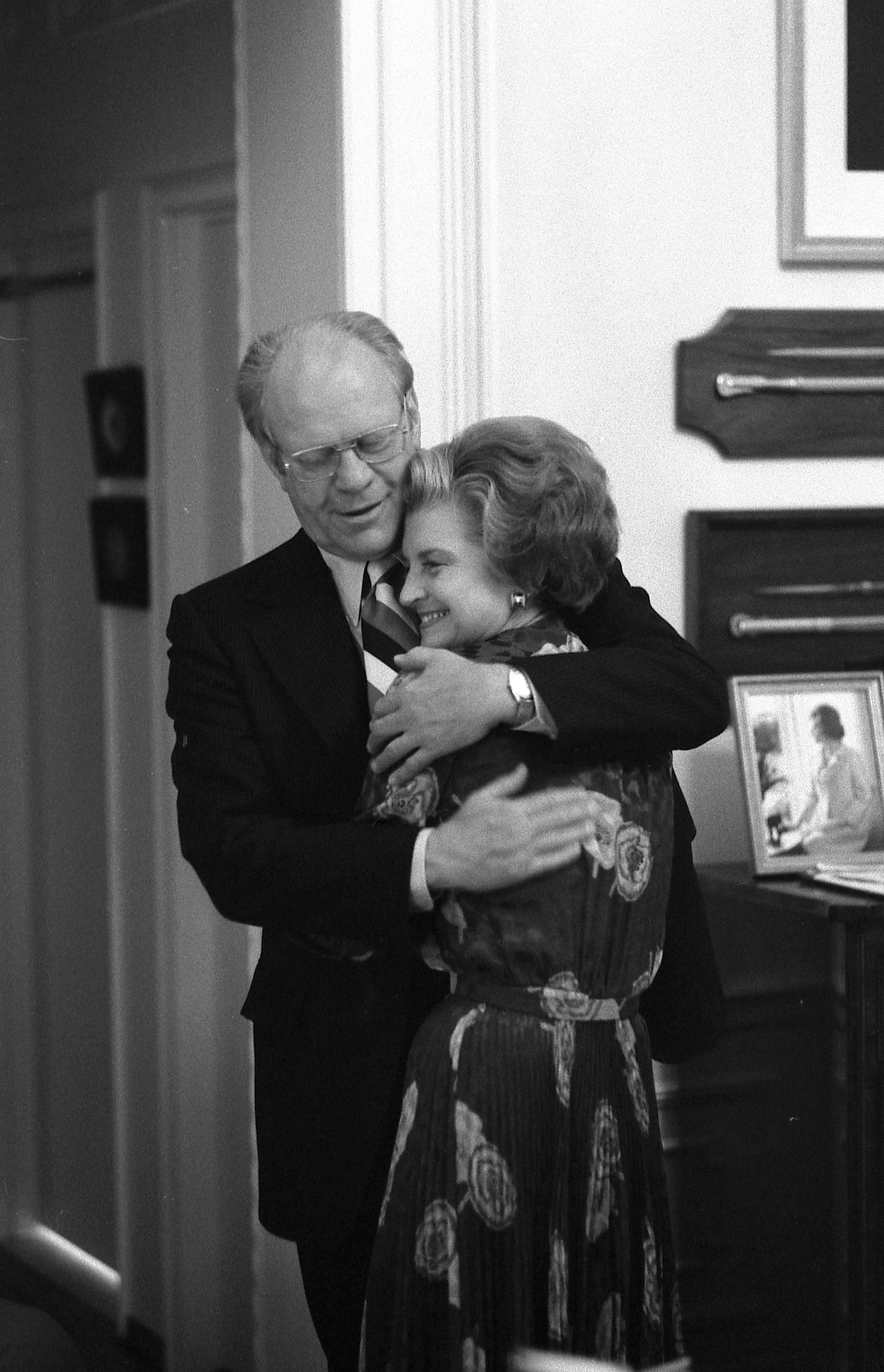
President and Mrs. Ford as they watch the presidential election returns (1976)

=== Books ===
Kennerly has authored six books:

- Shooter, Newsweek books, 1979
- Photo Op: A Pulitzer Prize-Winning Photographer Covers Events That Shaped Our Times, University of Texas Press (1995) ISBN 0-292-74323-8
- Sein Off: The Final Days of Seinfeld, HarperCollins, (1998)
- Photo du Jour: A Picture-a-Day Journey through the First Year of the New Millennium, University of Texas Press, (2003)
- Extraordinary Circumstances: The Presidency of Gerald R. Ford, The University of Texas Center for American History, (2007)
- On the iPhone: Secrets and Tips from a Pulitzer Prize-winning Photographer. Goff Books, 2014

Kennerly has been a major contributor to the following:

- Unprecedented: The Election That Changed Everything, CNN, 2017
- Barack Obama: The Official Inaugural Book
- A Day in the Life book projects: America, Spain, the Soviet Union; The People's Republic of China; the United States Armed Forces, Hollywood

== Cultural depictions ==
Kennerly was portrayed in the Showtime television series The First Lady, by Cody Pressley, depicting the scene where he shot the photos of First Lady Betty Ford on the Cabinet Room table.
