= Nedra Volz =

American actress (1908–2003)

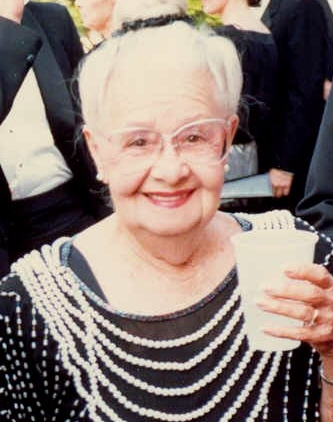
- Volz at the 39th Emmy Awards, September 1987
- Born: Nedra Viola Gordonier; June 18, 1908; Montrose, Iowa, U.S.
- Died: January 20, 2003 (aged 94); Mesa, Arizona, U.S.
- Occupation: Actress
- Years active: 1973–1996
- Spouse: Oren William Volz (m. 1944; died 1987)
- Children: 2

Nedra Volz (née Gordonier; June 18, 1908 – January 20, 2003) was an American actress. On television, she portrayed Aunt Iola on All in the Family, Adelaide Brubaker on Diff'rent Strokes, Emma Tisdale on The Dukes of Hazzard, Pearl Sperling on The Fall Guy, and Winona Beck on Filthy Rich. Her film roles include Big Ed in Lust in the Dust (1985), Loretta Houk in Moving Violations (1985), and Lana in Earth Girls Are Easy (1988).

== Early life and career ==
Volz was born in Montrose, Iowa. She began her career as a toddler in the family tent show, billed as "Baby Nedra". The act continued until she was 11 years old and had outgrown the role. She unsuccessfully tried acting in high school, which led her to pursue music.

In the early 1930s, Volz was featured vocalist with Cato's Vagabonds. In 1932, Volz and two other singers from Cato's orchestra performed as "Nedra, Paul, and Glenn" on WHAM radio in Rochester, New York.

In 1940, Volz, described as a "blues songstress", was part of a vaudeville revue in Miami, Florida.

Beginning with an episode of Good Times in 1975, she became a well-recognized supporting character actress, primarily on television but also in movies. Volz often played grandmothers or feisty little old ladies in 1970s sitcoms such as Alice, Maude and One Day at a Time, and she appeared in two of Norman Lear's summer television series: as Grandma Belle Durbin in A Year at the Top in 1977 and as Bill Macy's housekeeper Pinky Nolan in Hanging In in 1979. In 1978, Volz appeared in the pilot episode of the TV series WKRP in Cincinnati, where she whacked a turntable with her umbrella in protest of the station's format change, and in All In The Family as Edith's spinster relative and unwelcome visitor, Aunt Iola.

In 1980, she appeared in several Jack in the Box TV spots as they blew up Jack, one of more than 25 commercials that featured Volz.

By 1980 she appeared on TV almost weekly, starting with a recurring role as housekeeper Adelaide Brubaker in the sitcom Diff'rent Strokes. In 1981 she landed another recurring role as postal worker Emma Tisdale on the TV show The Dukes of Hazzard. In the 1982–83 season, Volz was the matriarch on Filthy Rich, a series spoofing prime-time soap operas of the day. Volz's character Winona "Mother B" Beck, was the discarded first wife of cryogenically frozen Big Guy Beck (Slim Pickens and, after his death, Forrest Tucker), constantly trying to escape from the nursing home to return to the family mansion, Toad Hall. Volz's final series role was as Pearl Sperling, one of the bail-bonds women that employed Lee Majors's bounty-hunter character Colt Seavers, on The Fall Guy.

In "Mission of Peace", a 1986 episode of The A-Team, she was one of a group of senior citizens forced into asking the team for help. She portrayed the roles of Mrs. Perwinkle and Angelica on The Super Mario Bros. Super Show in 1989. She continued as a guest star on such series as Night Court, Coach, The Commish and Babes into the early 1990s, and she continued to act well into her eighties.

In Moving Violations, director Neil Israel allowed her to do many stunts herself, including being lifted into a window and falling head-first onto the floor. Volz's last acting role was in The Great White Hype in 1996.

== Death ==
Volz died on January 20, 2003, of complications from Alzheimer's disease in Mesa, Arizona.

== Filmography ==
=== Film ===
Year	Title	Role	Notes
1973	Your Three Minutes Are Up	Free Pass Lady	
1977	Mule Feathers	Clamity Jane	
1979	10	Mrs. Kissell	
1980	Little Miss Marker	Mrs. Clancy	
1983	National Lampoon's Movie Madness	Old Lady - 'Growing Yourself'	
1985	Lust in the Dust	Big Ed	
1985	Moving Violations	Mrs. Loretta Houk	
1988	Mortuary Academy	Helen	
1988	Earth Girls Are Easy	Lana	
1993	Betrayal of the Dove	Opal Vaneck	
1994	Il silenzio dei prosciutti	Ranger's wife	
1994	Dickwad	Old Lady	Short
1996	The Great White Hype	Old Lady	(final film role)

=== Television ===
Year	Title	Role	Notes
1975	They Only Come Out at Night	Elderly woman	Television film
1975	Good Times	Old Lady	Episode: Florida's Protest
1976	Rhoda	Elderly woman	Episode: Meet the Levys
1976–1977	Mary Hartman, Mary Hartman	Mrs. DeFarge / Barbie	19 episodes Recurring role (Season 2)
1976–1982	One Day at a Time	Mrs. Peabody / Emily	4 episodes
1977	The Tony Randall Show	Mildred Piersen	Episode: Democracy vs. Tyranny
1977	A Year at the Top	Grandma Belle Durbin	5 episodes Main cast (Season 1)
1977	Fernwood 2 Night	Barbara Forman	Episode: #1.30
1978–1980	Eight Is Enough	Mrs. Yaterman	2 episodes
1978	Apple Pie	Mrs. Cassidy	Episode: Tornado
1978–1980	Alice	Esther / Gambler	3 episodes
1978	All in the Family	Aunt Iola	Episode: Aunt Iola's Visit
1978	Maude	Pinky Nolan	Episode: Maude's Big Move: Part 3
1978	WKRP in Cincinnati	Mrs. Burstyn	Episode: Pilot: Part 2
1978	Carter Country	Mrs. Forsythe	Episode: Poor Butterfly
1979	Mr. Dugan	Pinky Nolan	Maude's spin-off never aired
1979	Angie	Hostess	Episode: Joyce's Job
1979	Hanging In	Pinky Nolan	4 episodes Main cast (Season 1)
1979	The Baxters	Helen Lawson	Episode: Victims of Inflation
1980–1984	Diff'rent Strokes	Adelaide Brubaker	22 episodes Recurring role (Seasons 2–4) Guest star (Season 6)
1980	Condominium	Mrs. Conlaw	Television film
1980	Quincy M.E.	Gladys	Episode: T.K.O.
1980	The Stockard Channing Show	Mother Clyde	Episode: Susan's Big Break
1980	Gridlock	Mrs. Felcher	Television film
1980–1984	The Dukes of Hazzard	Emma Tisdale	13 episodes Recurring role (Seasons 3–5) Guest star (Season 7)
1981	Hart to Hart	Mrs. Bittersweet	Episode: Hart-Shaped Murder
1981	Pals	Emily Baines	Television short
1982–1983	Filthy Rich	Winona 'Mother B' Beck	15 episodes Main cast (Seasons 1–2)
1983	Insight	Mrs. Minerva	Dutton's Choice
1983–1984	Match Game-Hollywood Squares Hour	Herself (panelist)	45 episodes
1984	Last of the Great Survivors	Gladys	Television film
1984	The Love Boat	Dancing Partner	Episode: Soap Gets in Your Eyes/A Match Made in Heaven/Tugs of the Heart
1984	For Love or Money	Hypatia	Television film
1984–1986	Gimme a Break!	Maid	3 episodes
1985–1986	The Fall Guy	Pearl Sperling	7 episodes Season 5 (Recurring role)
1986	Night Court	Little Old Lady	Episode: Contempt of Courting
1986	The A-Team	Little Old Lady	Episode: Mission of Peace
1986	Who's the Boss?	Ethel	Episode: Forgive Me, Tony
1986	My Sister Sam	Dora	Episode: Walk a While in My Shoes
1987–1988	ALF	Cat Woman	2 episodes
1988	It's a Living	Mrs. Thompson	Episode: Tune In, Tune Out
1988	Designing Women	Mother	Episode: Hard Hats and Lovers
1989	Webster	Ida	Episode: A-Camping We Will Go
1989	TV 101	Mother Steadman	Episode: Keegan's Past
1989	Super Mario Bros. Super Show	Mrs. Periwinkle / Angelica / Spooky Gadgets Incorporated	2 episodes
1990	Dear John	Dotty	Episode: Honolulu Baby
1990–1991	Babes	Mrs. Florence Newman	5 episodes Recurring role (Season 1)
1992	The Commish	Mrs. Zimmerman	Episode: Sex, Lies and Kerosene
1993	Coach	Gertrude	Episode: Christmas of the Van Damned
1993–1994	Step by Step	Mrs. Slezak / Shirley	2 episodes
