= Caitlin O'Heaney =

American actress (1952–2026)

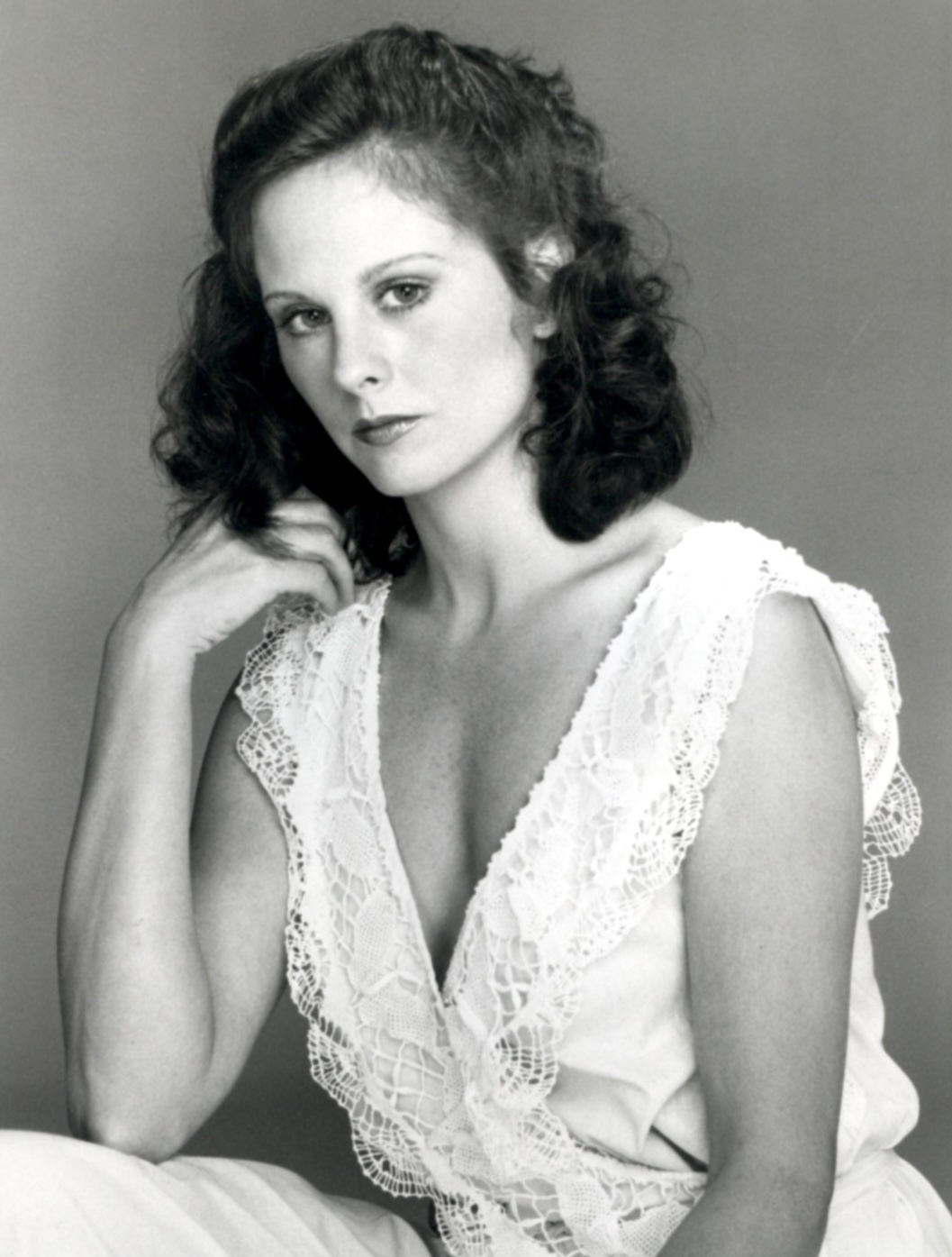
- O'Heaney in 1982
- Born: Kathleen Heaney; August 16, 1952; Milwaukee, Wisconsin, U.S.
- Died: May 18, 2026 (aged 73); Tarrytown, New York, U.S.
- Education: Juilliard School (BFA)
- Occupations: Television, film and stage actress

Caitlin O'Heaney (/kæθliːn/; born Kathleen Heaney; August 16, 1952 – May 18, 2026) was an American television, film and stage actress. She worked extensively in live theater, but is best known for playing Sarah Stickney White, the female lead on the ABC series Tales of the Gold Monkey in the early 1980s. O'Heaney also played Snow White Charming in the first season of ABC's The Charmings in 1987.

== Early life and education ==
O'Heaney was born Kathleen Heaney in Milwaukee, Wisconsin, on August 16, 1952. She was raised in Whitefish Bay, where she attended Whitefish Bay High School. O'Heaney was of Irish descent and was raised Roman Catholic. She has two older sisters.

She won a full scholarship to the Juilliard School in New York City when she was 17. She was a member of the Juilliard Drama Division's Group 3 (1970–1974).

== Stage career ==
O'Heaney made her off-Broadway debut as Loretta in The Hot House at the Chelsea Theatre, then remained at the Chelsea to play Finkel in Yentl and to understudy Tovah Feldshuh in the title role. She moved to Broadway to understudy the role of Elizabeth in A Matter of Gravity, starring Katharine Hepburn and co-starring her Juilliard friend and colleague Christopher Reeve.

She relocated to Seattle to appear as Celia in As You Like It, Gwendolyn in Travesties, and Eylie in Ladyhouse Blues at ACT/Seattle, then returned to New York to play the double roles of Belle and Mrs. Cratchit in A Christmas Carol at Playwrights Horizon. When A Christmas Carol closed, O'Heaney moved to Los Angeles, and five weeks later she was cast as Anna Marie Hollyhock in the 1978 ABC comedy series Apple Pie, which was produced by Norman Lear, directed by Peter Bonerz, and starred Rue McClanahan, Dabney Coleman, Jack Gilford, Derrel Maury, Mike Binder and Richard Libertini. This was a highlight of O'Heaney's career. She said with regard to the experience, "It was pure magic and incredible fun working every day with these wonderful people!"

O'Heaney remained in Los Angeles to play fourteen-year-old Bianca in White Marriage at the Odyssey Theatre and won a Drama-Logue Award for Best Actress for the role. She then returned to the East Coast to star as Ersilla Drei in Pirandello's Naked at the Syracuse Stage, and performances in Ape Watch at the Mark Taper Forum Lab and in The Brides at the Lenox Art Centre soon followed. She appeared off-Broadway as Olive Lashbrook in The Voice of the Turtle, for which she received a very positive review in The New York Times, and in Scenes and Revelations.

== Film and television work ==
O'Heaney appeared in the television movie The Seeding of Sarah Burns in 1979 and as waitress Lurleen Hamett in ABC's One Life to Live. She played the female lead, Amy, in the horror feature He Knows You're Alone (1980), which was Tom Hanks' first feature film. In 1982, she was cast in the lead female role of Sarah Stickney White in ABC's Tales of the Gold Monkey, also starring Stephen Collins, Roddy McDowall and Jeff MacKay. She also appeared as 1930s Hollywood actress Dolores Farrar in Woody Allen's 1983 film Zelig, and Allen would cast her again in The Purple Rose of Cairo in 1985. She played Miss Farmer in the 1987 film Three O'Clock High.

Although she was active in television until 1993, O'Heaney did not appear in any feature films for nearly two decades, then returned in 2002 as Mrs. Woodbridge in The Emperor's Club with Kevin Kline, O'Heaney's colleague and friend at Juilliard. She also played Aunt Fran in the 2005 film Brooklyn Lobster, and most recently appeared in the 2007 independent feature Asylum Seekers. O'Heaney wrapped the feature film Late Phases, a thriller directed by Adrian Garcia Bogliano, in June 2013 in which she played the role of Emma.

== Other work and interests ==
In the mid-1970s, Salvador Dalí offered Caitlin the opportunity to model for him, but Gala, his wife, was not in favor of the project so it was canceled.

In 2006-2007, O'Heaney performed on radio with Air Pirates Radio Theater.

In February 2008, she wrote the music and lyrics for an anti-war environmentalist song titled "Who Have We Freed?" which she recorded with Pete Seeger. She and Seeger have performed "Who Have We Freed?" at various environmental/anti-war festivals in and around New York.

O'Heaney was involved with independent playwrights at Manhattan Theatre Source and the National Arts Club, both in New York City.

== Death ==
O'Heaney died in Westchester County, New York, on May 18, 2026, at the age of 73.

== Filmography ==
Film

Year	Title	Role	Notes
1979	Savage Weekend	Shirley Sales	
1979	The Seeding of Sarah Burns	Linda	Television film
1980	He Knows You're Alone	Amy Jensen	
1981	Wolfen	ESS Operator	
1982	A Midsummer Night's Sex Comedy	Dolores Farrar	Uncredited
1983	Zelig		Scenes cut
1985	The Purple Rose of Cairo		Scenes cut
1986	Convicted	Laura Larkin	Television film
1987	Three O'Clock High	Miss Farmer	
1988	Badlands 2005	Sarah Gwynne	Television film
2002	The Emperor's Club	Mrs. Woodbridge	
2014	Late Phases	Emma	

Television

Year	Title	Role	Notes
1978	Apple Pie	Anna Marie Hollyhock	7 episodes
1982	Tales of the Gold Monkey	Sarah Stickney White	21 episodes
1984	AfterMASH	Laura	1 episode
1986	Spenser: For Hire	Laure Louise Johnson	1 episode
1986	Silver Spoons	Jackie	1 episode
1987	St. Elsewhere	Debbie Hoffman	1 episode
1987	The Charmings	Snow White Charming	6 episodes
1987	Murder, She Wrote	Tara Sillman	1 episode
1987	Beauty and the Beast	Bridget O'Donnell	1 episode
1987	L.A. Law	Kiki Sennheiser	1 episode
1989	Alien Nation	Jenny Moffatt	1 episode
1990	Matlock	Mrs. Estes	1 episode
1990	Over My Dead Body	Lila Chalmers	1 episode
1992	Civil Wars	Carol Bloch	1 episode
1993	Raven	Erin Stucky	1 episode
