= The Charmings =

American fantasy television sitcom

- Genre: Fantasy; Sitcom
- Created by: Robert Sternin; Prudence Fraser
- Written by: Prudence Fraser; Mark Fink; Ellen Guylas; Carrie Honigblum; Danny Kallis; Robert Sternin
- Directed by: Gerren Keith; Howard Murray; Jack Shea
- Starring: Christopher Rich; Caitlin O'Heaney (Season 1); Carol Huston (Season 2); Judy Parfitt; Cork Hubbert; Brandon Call; Garette Ratliff Henson; Paul Eiding; Dori Brenner; Paul Winfield
- Composers: Ray Colcord; Jonathan Wolff
- Country of origin: United States
- Original language: English
- No. of seasons: 2
- No. of episodes: 21 (1 unaired)

Production
- Executive producers: Prudence Fraser; Robert Sternin
- Producer: Danny Kallis
- Running time: 24–25 minutes
- Production companies: Sternin & Fraser Ink, Inc.; Embassy Communications; Columbia Pictures Television (1988; episodes 17-21)

Original release
- Network: ABC
- Release: March 20, 1987 – February 11, 1988

The Charmings is an American fantasy sitcom that follows Snow White and Prince Charming, awakened from a thousand-year spell, as they adjust from their familiar life in the enchanted forest to the modern ways of 20th-century Los Angeles suburbs. The series originally aired from March 20, 1987, to February 11, 1988, on ABC.

== Synopsis ==
The opening voice-over sets up the premise:

Once upon a time, there was a vain queen who was so jealous of her beautiful stepdaughter, Snow White, that she poisoned her with an apple. But a handsome prince came along and broke the spell. Snow White and Prince Charming threw the wicked stepmother down a bottomless pit and lived happily ever after. But, it turns out the pit wasn't bottomless—just very deep. And now, the queen was very mad. With a spell so powerful even she couldn't control it, she put the Charmings asleep for a thousand years. She also got herself and one dwarf. Eventually they woke up.

The premise of the series' plot was that fairy tale characters Snow White and Prince Charming were magically transported to a 20th-century suburb in Burbank, California. Each episode shows the Charmings trying to adapt to their new life while Lillian (Judy Parfitt), the wicked stepmother, and her wise cracking Magic Mirror (Paul Winfield) watch from upstairs. After the first season, Caitlin O'Heaney (who portrayed Snow White) was replaced by Carol Huston.

After mild success as part of ABC's Friday night lineup, the series was moved to Thursday nights for its second season, in a head-to-head battle with NBC's A Different World, and later The Cosby Show. Due to low ratings, the series was canceled after twenty episodes. One episode remains unaired in the US, though it was shown during the show's run in the UK and in 2021 in Canada on CTV.

== Characters ==
- Snow White Charming (portrayed by Caitlin O'Heaney in 1987, Carol Huston in 1987–1988.) - Her "fairy tale" motif catches the attention of a department store executive, who sponsors a line of interior decorating products and gives her a job overseeing the designs.
- Prince Eric Charming (portrayed by Christopher Rich) - Unskilled at anything in the modern world, he largely is a stay-at-home dad who writes about his time in the Enchanted Kingdom. Later, he learns he has a skill for handyman work and carpentry, and soon gets a job in construction.
- Queen Lillian White (portrayed by Judy Parfitt) - The wicked stepmother of Snow White whose sorcery often backfires on her, but occasionally proves useful in helping her family.
- Luther (portrayed by Cork Hubbert) - A dwarf that helps out the Charmings after being caught in the same spell that caused everyone to sleep until modern times.
- Thomas and Cory Charming (portrayed by Brandon Call and Garette Ratliff Henson) - The two Charming children of Snow White and Prince Eric Charming and the step-grandsons of Lillian. Due to their spending the least time in the fairy tale world, they had been the most assimilated into 20th century society and they face difficulties accepting they are from fairy tales.
- Don "King of Carpets" Miller and Sally Miller (portrayed by Paul Eiding and Dori Brenner) - The Charmings' neighbors who find their new neighbors' penchant for medieval fairy tale style odd but never figured out they were the real Prince Charming and Snow White. Even when Eric is under a truth spell and confides in Don that they were Prince Charming and Snow White, Don considers it a joke.
- The Magic Mirror (portrayed by Paul Winfield) - In this show, the Magic Mirror is depicted as a man inside a mirror. The Mirror frequently reminds Lillian that her daughter and son-in-law will come out on top and make it in this new land because unlike her, they are goodhearted people who respected others. A running gag is that he makes remarks about how Snow White is the fairest and telling Lillian "it ain't you!" whenever she asks who is the fairest. However, it is implied he may have been joking because at one point in this show when Lillian has lost her powers and he must depart, he confides in her that she has always been the fairest.

== Episodes ==
Season	Episodes	Originally released	
Season	Episodes	First released	Last released
1	6	March 20, 1987	April 17, 1987
2	15	September 17, 1987	February 11, 1988

=== Season 1 ===
No. overall	No. in season	Title	Directed by	Written by	Original release date
1	1	"The Charmings"	Will Mackenzie	Prudence Fraser, Robert Sternin	March 20, 1987
Prince Charming, Snow White and their family find themselves in the 20th century and have problems trying to adapt to the modern world.
2	2	"The Mirror Cracked"	Mark Cullingham	Rich Reinhart	March 27, 1987
Eric and Snow throw a party in an attempt to make new friends. Annoyed by their reluctance to invite her, Lillian uses her magic to spoil the festivities, but it results in her own beloved Magic Mirror getting broken.
3	3	"Modern Romance"	Gerren Keith	Doug Bernstein, Denis Markel	April 3, 1987
Luther and Lillian make a bet that they can get a better date. While Luther finds an attractive girl, Lillian chooses to drag a bum off the street and makes a potion to turn him into a hunk. Cameo Appearance by Rip Taylor
4	4	"The Charmings Buy a Car"	Bill Foster	Ellen Guylas	April 10, 1987
For their 1,010th anniversary, Eric buys Snow a lemon of a car from a sleazy used car dealer. Meanwhile, the Mirror tries to coax Lillian into taking a trip to Las Vegas. Eric beats the salesman through a 20th-century twist on his fairy tale values of honor.
5	5	"The Incredible Shrinking Prince"	Jack Shea	Bob Myer, Bob Young	April 17, 1987
Attempting to find a way to earn money, Lillian concocts a diet potion, but it turns out that it is actually a "reducing" formula; Eric inadvertently drinks it and shrinks to 12 inches high.
6	6	"An '80s Kind of Prince"	Gerren Keith	Christopher Ames, Carolyn Shelby	April 17, 1987
Lillian tries to break up Snow and Eric by putting a spell on a neighbor to fall in love with Eric.

=== Season 2 ===
No. overall	No. in season	Title	Directed by	Written by	Original release date
7	1	"Lillian Loses the Kids"	Jack Shea	Ellen Guylas	September 17, 1987
To keep them quiet, Lillian turns the children into mannequins, but she's unable to change them back.
8	2	"The Charmings Go Plastic"	Jack Shea	Mark Fink	September 24, 1987
When Snow gets a credit card the family goes on a shopping spree, and when the bill comes they are shocked. Snow and Eric have a big fight. Lillian magically gets her own credit card but, because of the information she placed on it, she is audited by the IRS.
9	3	"The Witch of Van Oaks"	Jack Shea	Danny Kallis	October 1, 1987
Snow and Eric set up Lillian with a new neighbor (John Astin), but they quickly come to realize that he's actually the devil. Meanwhile, Luther gets an ego boost regarding his short stature from the children.
10	4	"The Fish Story"	Jack Shea	Jeff Greenstein, Jeff Strauss	October 8, 1987
After Lilian uses magic to restore a broken lamp, the children decide to use her spell-book to revive their recently deceased pet fish. Meanwhile, Eric faces Snow's wrath when he misses her wildlife preservation meeting.
11	5	"Cindy's Back in Town"	Jack Shea	Carrie Honigblum, Renee Phillips	October 15, 1987
Lillian's attempt to zap herself back into the Enchanted Forest goes awry, landing Cinderella (Kim Johnston Ulrich) in the Charming home. Cinderella's arrival doesn't bode well with Snow — particularly when "Cindy" makes a play for Eric.
12	6	"A Charming Halloween"	Jack Shea	Dan O'Shannon	October 29, 1987
Embarrassed by his family's antics, Thomas neglects to tell Eric about a father/son car wash. But the family causes even more humiliation for the lad when Eric insists on hosting the neighborhood Halloween party. Guest-starring Jenny Lewis as Sara.
13	7	"Trading Places"	Jack Shea	Mark Fink	November 12, 1987
Luther expresses his envy of Eric's looks, so Lillian casts a spell to make the dwarf as handsome as a prince. The catch is that Luther and Eric switch bodies and can only return to normal if Luther wishes — and sincerely means it.
14	8	"Lillian Loses Her Powers"	Jack Shea	Jay Folb	November 19, 1987
As a result of Cory passing the flu to the family, Eric becomes a hypochondriac and Lillian loses her magic powers (and as a non-witch, she has to say goodbye to her Magic Mirror).
15	9	"The Charmings and the Beanstalk"	Jack Shea	Danny Kallis	November 26, 1987
Lillian throws out some beans and they sprout into a beanstalk and a giant named Henry (Walter Olkewicz) comes down. When they chop the beanstalk down, Henry finds himself stuck. At the same time, Snow and Eric are having problems and Henry takes a liking to Lillian. Eventually, Henry's wife Alice (Teresa Ganzel) follows him and he refuses to go back with her.
16	10	"Yes, Lillian, There Is a Santa Claus"	Jack Shea	Carrie Honigblum, Renee Phillips	December 17, 1987
Lillian tries to ruin Christmas by telling the children that there is no Santa Claus, but gets a shock when Santa Claus does arrive at the Charming house only to find no "believers" left there. Since Santa Claus only delivers gifts to true believer, Lillian must use her powers to try to correct the damage she has done.
17	11	"The Charmings Get Robbed"	Jack Shea	Carrie Honigblum, Renee Phillips	January 7, 1988
After two teen crooks rob the Charmings', Eric over-zealously protects their home, such as making a moat with alligator. Meanwhile, Lillian tries to track down the family's stolen possessions, but finds it difficult, having lost her spell-book and beloved Magic Mirror in the robbery. The Mirror attempts to set the robbers right by posing as their consciences. Guest-starring Billy Jayne as Al
18	12	"Birth of a Salesman"	Howard Murray	Mark Fink	January 14, 1988
In order to pay for rising expenses, Eric gets a job working as a salesman for Don. Eric proves a lousy salesman when he says competitors have better deals and extends credit to a struggling couple, causing Don to warn Eric he needs to shape up. Snow wishes Eric was a little less considerate as well, causing Lillian to remark she will do that with a spell. Lillian's new spell makes Eric a ruthless salesman and obnoxious sleaze. Snow must convince Lillian to reverse the spell when a relative of the earlier couple is a hotelier who wished to meet Eric, and this could cost Don a lucrative contract.
19	13	"The Man Who Came to Dinner"	Phil Squyres	Carrie Honigblum, Renee Phillips	January 21, 1988
Lillian puts a spell on Eric to make him tell the absolute truth, at the same time he invited Don to cool off with him after a heated argument with Sally. Lillian transcribes all of her spells into her computer, causing the Mirror to comment she turned into a computer nerd. Lillian also causes a spell that results in Don having total amnesia.
20	14	"The Woman of His Dreams"	Howard Murray	Lan O'Kun	February 11, 1988
Eric says that Snow is the only woman for him, so Lillian makes one of the women from Don's girlie magazines come to life and appear at random times to have fun with Eric. Guest-starring Jackie Swanson as Candy
21	15	"Lillian's Protege"	Jack Shea	Prudence Fraser, Robert Sternin	unaired
Amused by a devious shoplifter, Lillian takes her in — but has a change of heart when the girl sets up Thomas to get caught stealing. Meanwhile, Snow and Eric question their parenting skills in the modern world. Guest-starring Viveka Davis as Amy

== International Broadcast ==
In Italy, the show aired on Odeon TV under the name Biancaneve a Beverly Hills (Snow White in Beverly Hills) from 1988 until 1989. It was also aired in Israel under the name Snow White in the 20th Century.

== Awards and nominations ==
Year	Award	Result	Category	Recipient
1987	Emmy Awards	Nominated	Outstanding Technical Direction/Electronic Camerawork/Video Control for a Series	Warren Cress, Ross Harmon, Charles T. Henry, Bud Holland, Stephen A. Jones, Art LaCombe, Bill Scott, and Dave Smith (For episode "The Incredible Shrinking Prince")
1987	Emmy Awards	Nominated	Outstanding Achievement in Costuming for a Series	Betsey Potter (For episode "Modern Romance")
1988	Emmy Awards	Nominated	Outstanding Technical Direction/Electronic Camerawork/Video Control for a Series	Warren Cress, Ross Harmon, Charles T. Henry, Joe Talosi, Harriet Uhl, Dave Smith, and Dale Walsh (For episode "Trading Places")
1988	Emmy Awards	Won	Outstanding Lighting Direction (Electronic) for a Comedy Series	Mark Buxbaum (For episode "The Witch Is of Van Oaks")
1988	Young Artist Awards	Nominated	Exceptional Performance by a Young Actor in a Television Comedy Series	Brandon Call
