= Charlie Hauck =

American producer and screenwriter (1941–2020)

- Born: October 26, 1941; Cleveland, Ohio, U.S.
- Died: November 14, 2020 (aged 79); Los Angeles, California, U.S.
- Education: John Carroll University
- Occupations: Producer, screenwriter
- Years active: 1974–2010
- Spouse: Marcia Cogan (m. 1964; div. 1979)
- Children: 4

Charlie Hauck (October 26, 1941 – November 14, 2020) was an American comedy writer, producer and screenwriter. He is best known as producer of the classic Norman Lear-created sitcom Maude and as the creator of the American family sitcom television series The Hogan Family. He is also one of the co-creators of the short-lived sitcom television series The Associates, which he co-created with James L. Brooks, Stan Daniels, Ed. Weinberger and Michael J. Leeson.

== Early life ==
Hauck was born in Cleveland. After graduating from John Carroll University, in 1963, for the academic year 1963-64, Hauck taught English literature at Holy Name High School in Cleveland, Ohio. Hauck then moved to Pittsburgh and was hired as a reporter and bureau chief for BusinessWeek magazine.

== Career ==
Hauck began his television writing career in 1974, after moving to Los Angeles where he wrote for comedian Flip Wilson.

In 1975, Hauck began working on the television series Maude as a producer and writer. His other credits includes, M*A*S*H, One Day at a Time, That's My Mama, Insight, Apple Pie, Hot l Baltimore and Another Day. In 1979 he became one of the co-creators of the new ABC sitcom television series The Associates, which ran from 1979 to 1980, and for which he was nominated for an Primetime Emmy for Outstanding Writing in a Comedy Series.

In 1980s and 1990s, Hauck created, produced and wrote for the sitcom television series The Two of Us, which starred British comedic actor Peter Cook and American actress Mimi Kennedy and was based on the British London Weekend Television sitcom Two's Company. He created the new NBC family sitcom television series The Hogan Family in 1986, which was first titled Valerie from 1986 to 1987, and starred Valerie Harper as Valerie Hogan. In Season 2, Hauck changed the title to Valerie's Family, and then to The Hogan Family in Season 3, when Valerie Harper was fired from the series and was replaced by actress, Sandy Duncan as "Sandy Hogan".

In 1993, Hauck authored the comic novel Artistic Differences, described by The New York Times as, "a caustically funny account of star temperament within network television.

Hauck wrote and worked as executive producer for the television sitcom Home Improvement in Season 6, but left the series in Season 7. He also wrote and was an consulting producer for the television sitcom Frasier, in Season 7, for which in 2000 he was again nominated for a Primetime Emmy for Outstanding Comedy Series.

Hauck was the host of the Humanitas Prize Awards from 2007 to 2010.

== Death ==
On November 14, 2020, at the age of 79, Hauck died in Los Angeles of complications from pancreatic cancer.
