= Mr. Dugan =

- Genre: Sitcom
- Created by: Norman Lear
- Written by: Rod Parker; Charles Hauck
- Directed by: Jeff Bleckner
- Starring: Cleavon Little; Barbara Rhoades; Nedra Volz; Dennis Burkley; Sarina Grant
- Country of origin: United States
- Original language: English
- No. of episodes: 3 (all unaired)

Production
- Executive producer: Norman Lear
- Producer: Charles Hauck
- Running time: 24 minutes
- Production company: T.A.T. Communications Company

Related
- Maude; Hanging In

Mr. Dugan is an American sitcom about a black Congressman that was scheduled to air in March 1979 on CBS, but was pulled at the last minute and never shown.

== History ==
In early 1978, producer Norman Lear felt his long-running comedy Maude was getting stale, so he decided to enliven things by moving the show to Washington, D.C., and making the title character a congresswoman. After two episodes in this new setting, star Beatrice Arthur decided not to continue, and the show abruptly left the air. Lear, however, still believed in the concept and filmed a new pilot titled Onward and Upward, with essentially the same script and cast—except with John Amos (as a black former professional football star running for the United States Congress) replacing Arthur. Creative differences between Amos (who had co-starred in Lear's Good Times) and the producers led to the actor bowing out; the show was renamed Mr. Dooley and finally Mr. Dugan. Cleavon Little (best known as the sheriff in the classic movie comedy Blazing Saddles) was hired as the title character, a fledgling black congressman. The supporting cast remained the same.

Mr Dugan was seen in newspaper TV listings nationwide just a few days before it was pulled by CBS

Mr. Dugan had been scheduled for a March 11, 1979, premiere, and was heavily promoted by CBS, complete with ads and listings in TV Guide and other publications. However, a special screening for actual black members of Congress proved to be an unmitigated disaster, as several members of the Congressional Black Caucus criticized the show. The sitcom was especially galling for freshman Congressman William Gray III, who, like the fictional Dugan, represented a district in Philadelphia: "The impact would be disastrous, showing a congressman who was a silly, incompetent man ruled by his staff." Lear subsequently pulled the plug on Mr. Dugan, saying, "We have not yet totally fulfilled our intention for the series."

The concept was eventually reworked again into the short-lived series, Hanging In, which aired on CBS in the summer of 1979.

== See also ==
- List of television series cancelled before airing an episode
