= The Matchmaker (2018 film) =

2018 short drama film directed by Leonora Pitts

- Directed by: Leonora Pitts
- Screenplay by: Sy Rosen
- Cinematography: Mike Kellog
- Music by: Nick Pierone
- Release date: July 29, 2018 (LA Shorts International Film Festival)
- Running time: 12 minutes
- Country: United States
- Language: English

The Matchmaker is a 2018 short drama film directed by Leonora Pitts.

== Synopsis ==
Sam is concerned that Flora, his elderly mother, is not getting the mental stimulation she needs to stave off dementia. When she moved into a retirement community, he decides to find her an ideal best friend to talk to, and keep her mind occupied. His entry into the lives of various residents in the community has unexpected results - some funny, and some heartbreaking.

== Cast ==
- Barbara Bain: Sarah
- Rhea Perlman: Irene
- Robert Romanus: Sam
- Bryna Weiss: Flora

== Awards ==
- 2018: Women Over 50 Film Festival - Best Drama
- 2018: Dam Short Film Festival: Best of the Fest Audience Award

== Official selection - Select festival screenings ==
- Newport Beach Film Festival
- Hollywood Comedy Short Film Festival
- Bentonville Film Festival
- LA Shorts International Film Festival
- Raindance Film Festival
- Oregon Short Film Festival
- ReelAbilities Film Festival: New York
- San Luis Obispo International Film Festival
