= Garette Ratliff Henson =

American actor

- Born: Garette Patrick Henson; January 5, 1980 (age 45); Burbank, California, U.S.
- Education: Sarah Lawrence College (BA); Columbia University (MFA)
- Years active: 1984–1997, 2004–present
- Children: 1
- Relatives: Elden Henson (brother); Ellington Ratliff (half-brother)

Garette Ratliff Henson (born January 5, 1980) is an American actor, best known for his role as Guy Germaine in The Mighty Ducks trilogy.

== Early life and education ==
Henson was born in Burbank, California to a professional photographer mother. He is the younger brother of Elden Henson. Henson also has a younger half-brother, Ellington Ratliff, who is a member of the band R5. Henson attended a private school in Burbank, where he was on the honor roll. He started in show business as a baby model and in 1987 auditioned for and got the role of Cory Charming in The Charmings (1987). Henson graduated from Sarah Lawrence College in 2002 and an MFA in film from Columbia University in 2015.

== Career ==
In 1992, 1994, and 1996, he starred in The Mighty Ducks trilogy alongside his older brother, Elden, and continued to play hockey in school. In 1995 he played the role of Christina Ricci's character's school crush Vic DePhillippi in the movie Casper.

== Personal life ==
Henson resides in New York with his wife Laurie, whom he married in 2007, and their son, who was born in 2014.

== Filmography ==
=== Film ===
Year	Title	Role	Notes
1985	Radioactive Dreams	Phillip (age 4)	
1990	Arachnophobia	Tommy Jennings	
1990	Captain America	Young Tom Kimball	
1991	Return to the Blue Lagoon	Young Richard	
1992	Radio Flyer	Chad	
1992	The Mighty Ducks	Guy Germaine	
1993	The Adventures of Huck Finn	Billy Grangerford	
1994	D2: The Mighty Ducks	Guy Germaine	
1995	Casper	Vic	
1995	Three Wishes	Neighborhood Teenager	
1996	D3: The Mighty Ducks	Guy Germaine	
1997	Nevada	Weston	
2007	The Mannsfield 12	Andrew Perryman	
2022	Easter Sunday	Man	Uncredited

=== Television ===
Year	Title	Role	Notes
1986	Fame	Youngster #1	Episode: "All I Want for Christmas"
1986	Who's the Boss?	Golfing Kid	Episode: "Spud Micelli"
1987	Outlaws	Little Boy	Episode: "Madrid"
1987	Her Secret Life	Scott	Television film
1987–1988	The Charmings	Cory Charming	21 episodes
1987, 1989	Highway to Heaven	Tommy / Stevie Douglas	2 episodes
1989	Empty Nest	Demetrie	Episode: "Overdue for a Job"
1991	Doogie Howser, M.D.	Will	2 episodes
1993	For Their Own Good	Younger Jody	Television film
1994	Oldest Living Confederate Widow Tells All	Ned Smythe	Miniseries
1997	Melrose Place	Teenager at accident	Episode: "The Accidental Doctor"
2004	NCIS	Young Cpl. Ernie Yost	Episode: "Call of Silence"
2006	Cold Case	Jason Bowen	Episode: "The River"
2007	Close to Home	Brian Hall	Episode: "Making Amends"
2021	The Mighty Ducks: Game Changers	Guy Germaine	Episode: "Spirit of the Ducks"
