= Morton Lachman =

American comedy writer and producer

Morton Lachman (March 20, 1918 – March 17, 2009) was an American comedy writer and producer who worked for Bob Hope for more than twenty years and subsequently produced sitcoms for television, including All in the Family and Kate & Allie. He also worked on One Day at a Time and Sanford and later co-created Gimme a Break! with Sy Rosen.

He won two Emmy awards — one in 1978 for his work on All in the Family, and one in 1974 for his direction of an episode of The ABC Afternoon Playbreak.

He died at age 90 from a diabetes-related heart attack.
