= Apple Pie (TV series) =

- Promotional photo, (from left to right: Jack Gilford, Rue McClanahan, Dabney Coleman)
- Created by: Norman Lear
- Written by: Charlie Hauck; Sy Rosen; Bill Davenport; Arthur Julian
- Directed by: Peter Bonerz
- Starring: Rue McClanahan; Dabney Coleman; Jack Gilford; Caitlin O'Heaney; Derrel Maury
- Country of origin: United States
- Original language: English
- No. of seasons: 1
- No. of episodes: 8 (6 unaired)

Production
- Producer: Charlie Hauck
- Running time: 30 minutes
- Production company: T.A.T. Communications Company

Original release
- Network: ABC
- Release: September 23 – September 30, 1978

Apple Pie is an American sitcom that aired for only two episodes on ABC on September 23 and September 30, 1978.

== Overview ==
Rue McClanahan starred as Ginger-Nell Hollyhock, a single and lonely hairdresser who lives in Kansas City, Missouri, during the Great Depression year of 1933. When Ginger-Nell places classified ads in the local newspapers, she recruits a group of wacky relatives – "a con-man husband, Fast Eddie Murtaugh; a tap-dancing daughter, Anna Marie Hollyhock; a son who wanted to fly like a bird, Junior Hollyhock; and a tottering old blind grandfather, Grandpa Hollyhock – all of whom come to live together for the laughs."

== Cast ==
- Rue McClanahan as Ginger-Nell Hollyhock
- Dabney Coleman as Fast Eddie Murtaugh
- Jack Gilford as Grandpa Hollyhock
- Caitlin O'Heaney as Anna Marie Hollyhock
- Derrel Maury as Junior Hollyhock

== Episodes ==
No.	Title	Directed by	Written by	Original release date
1	"Pilot"	Peter Bonerz	Lawrence J. Cohen, Fred Freeman & Charlie Hauck	Unaired
When an FBI agent shows up at the Hollyhock house looking for a bank robbery suspect, Grandpa Hollyhock and the family thinks it's a laughing matter.
2	"Fast Eddie Slows Down"	Peter Bonerz	Charlie Hauck	September 23, 1978
In need of mortgage money, Ginger-Nell advertises for a head of household to pay the bill.
3	"Ginger-Nell Goes Hollywood"	Peter Bonerz	Charlie Hauck	September 30, 1978
A fast-talking door-to-door salesman (Ken Berry) tells Ginger-Nell she's going to be a star.
4	"Rich Man, Poor Girl"	Peter Bonerz	Sy Rosen	Unaired
Anna Marie falls in love with a wealthy snob (William Schallert) and Ginger-Nell fears he will take advantage of her.
5	"The Tornado"	Peter Bonerz	Bill Davenport	Unaired
A tornado hits town and the Hollyhock family seeks shelter in their cellar.
6	"Ginger-Nell Loses Her Touch"	Peter Bonerz	Arthur Julian	Unaired
7	"A Man from Ginger-Nell's Past"	Peter Bonerz	Arthur Julian	Unaired
8	"They Walk Among us"	Peter Bonerz	Sy Rosen	Unaired

== Reception ==
When the sitcom Maude ended in April 1978, producer Norman Lear created Apple Pie as a star vehicle for Rue McClanahan, who had played Vivian Harmon on Maude. The show was not well received and was canceled after two episodes, though eight had been filmed under the direction of Peter Bonerz.

Apple Pie was broadcast Saturday nights on ABC at 8:30 p.m. during its brief two-week run. It was videotaped before a live audience at Metromedia Square in Hollywood, California.
