= Shooter (1988 film) =

1988 American TV movie

- Genre: Action; Drama
- Based on: Shooter by David Hume Kennerly
- Written by: David Hume Kennerly; Steve Kline
- Directed by: Gary Nelson
- Starring: Jeffrey Nordling; Noble Willingham; Kario Salem; Helen Hunt
- Music by: Paul Chihara
- Country of origin: United States
- Original language: English

Production
- Executive producer: Gary David Goldberg
- Producers: Barry M. Berg; David Hume Kennerly
- Production location: Thailand
- Cinematography: Gayne Rescher
- Running time: 100 minutes
- Production companies: Paramount Television; Ubu Productions

Original release
- Network: NBC
- Release: September 11, 1988

Shooter is a 1988 American made-for-television action drama film based on the book Shooter by and about Pulitzer Prize-winning photographer David Hume Kennerly, who had been a combat photojournalist during the Vietnam War and later the White House photographer for President Gerald Ford. The film was produced as a pilot which was not picked up as a series by NBC and originally aired on September 11, 1988.

== Summary ==
The film followed the adventures in Vietnam of a fictional photo journalist named Matt Thompson, played by Jeffrey Nordling in his debut role.

It was made shortly after Good Morning Vietnam had been a success in theaters, and it borrowed two actors from the Good Morning Vietnam cast, Noble Willingham and Cu Ba Nguyen, as well as having a similar free-spirited protagonist who is constantly clashing with his superiors.

The television pilot was filmed on location in Thailand. David Hume Kennerly served as executive producer and writer. Gary Nelson directed the film.

== Cast ==
- Jeffrey Nordling as Matt Thompson / Grunwald
- Noble Willingham as Rizzo
- Kario Salem as Rene
- Helen Hunt as Tracey
- Alan Ruck as Stork O'Connor
- Jerry Alan Chandler as Klaus
- Carol Huston as Cat
- Rosalind Chao as Lan
- Nick Cassavetes as Tex
- Grace Zabriskie as Sister Marie
- Adrian Paul as Ian
- Louis Roth as Garth Andrews
- Steven Ford as Capt. Walker

== Awards ==
Shooter won an Emmy for cinematography.
