= Carol Huston =

American actress and singer

- Born: Milwaukee, Wisconsin, U.S.
- Occupations: Actor; singer; real estate agent
- Years active: 1982–2003
- Known for: Matlock (1994–95); A Very Brady Christmas (1988)

Carol Huston is an American real estate agent and former actress and singer.

== Early life ==
Carol Huston was born in Milwaukee, Wisconsin, and grew up in Des Plaines, Illinois.

Huston attended Forest View High School in nearby Arlington Heights, where she participated in its performing arts program. She started her early professional training there as a singer and actress. She attended Wheaton College as a voice major. At the time, she performed throughout Chicago as an actor and singer, most notably at the Goodman Theater. She was a member of the Chicago Sunday Evening Club Chorale, appearing weekly on Chicago's WTTW, a PBS station.

== Career ==
=== Acting ===
She is most well known for her roles in the TV series Matlock, The Charmings and Island Son. Huston replaced Caitlin O'Heaney as Snow Charming on The Charmings in 1987.

She appeared in an episode of the TV series Diagnosis: Murder called "Open and Shut", as well as A Very Brady Christmas as Peter Brady's fiancée (and boss), Valerie Thomas.

She appeared with Paul Newman and Tom Cruise in The Color of Money (1986), with Tom Hanks and Jackie Gleason in Nothing in Common (1986), and in Silk Stalkings (“Wild Card” 1992) as Regina “Reggie” Holland before relocating permanently to Southern California.

=== Real estate ===
Huston left acting in 2000 to become a real estate agent in Los Angeles, California and now owns her own company.

== Filmography ==
Year	Title	Role	Notes
1987–88	The Charmings	Snow White Charming	15 episodes
1988	Newhart	Erica Sloane	Episode: "The Big Uneasy"
1988	Shooter	Cat	TV movie
1988	A Very Brady Christmas	Valerie	TV movie
1989	Wild Jack	Constance Fielding	TV miniseries
1989	Hooperman	Dorothy	Episode: "Love Bytes"
1989–90	Island Son	Caitlin McGrath	19 episodes
1991	Guns of Paradise	Martha	Episode: "The Women"
1992	Silk Stalkings	Regina Holland	Episode: "Wild Card"
1993	Raven	Allison	Episode: "Checkmate"
1993	The Adventures of Brisco County, Jr.	Cassie Crow	Episode: "Brisco for the Defense"
1994	The Untouchables	Helen	Episode: "Family Ties"
1994	Viper	Lt. Sally Gerraro	2 episodes
1994–95	Matlock	Jerri Stone	15 episodes
1995	Nowhere Man	Sandra Wilson	Episode: "It's Not Such a Wonderful Life"
1996	Sisters	Veronica Spratt	Episode: "A Little Snag"
1997	The Pretender	Lt. Laura Pratt	Episode: "Bazooka Jarod"
1997	Diagnosis: Murder	Helen Porter	Episode: "Open and Shut"
1998	Chicago Hope	Marianne Lutsky	Episode: "Deliverance"
1998	Sliders	Vanessa	Episode: "California Reich"
1998	Spy Game	Victoria	Episode: "Go, Girl"
1999	Malibu, CA	Michele	Episode: "Mom Returns"
1999	Border Line	Karen (Adoption Agent)	TV movie
1999	Sons of Thunder	Brenda Kolshak	Episode: "Lost & Found"
2000	Linc's	Deeda Haliburton	Episode: "I Just Want to Testify"
2003	The Fairly OddParents	Background vocals	Episode: "Abra Catastrophe!"
