= The Spymasters =

2015 documentary film

The Spymasters: CIA In the Crosshairs is a 2015 documentary film which covers the experience of the Central Intelligence Agency as seen through the eyes of the twelve living CIA directors, all of whom were interviewed for the film. Directed and produced by Jules Naudet, Gedeon Naudet, and Chris Whipple, the documentary was aired on Showtime in the United States November 28, 2015. The project involved interviews which took more than a year and a half to conduct, beginning with former Director of Central Intelligence and 41st president George H. W. Bush and ending with George Tenet. The film also contains interviews with numerous other government figures and addresses the September 11 attacks, torture, Iraq War, and weapons of mass destruction controversies, as well as drone strikes. The disagreements among the former directors underscore the issues confronting the Agency, political leaders, and the American people. The former directors and the current director, however, seem to agree when it comes to war on terror: "You cannot kill your way out of this."

== See also ==
- List of films featuring drones
