= Two's Company (British TV series) =

British TV series (1975–1979)

- Two's Company DVD cover
- Created by: Bill MacIlwraith
- Starring: Elaine Stritch; Donald Sinden
- Country of origin: United Kingdom
- Original language: English
- No. of series: 4
- No. of episodes: 29

Production
- Running time: 25 minutes per episode
- Production company: LWT

Original release
- Network: ITV
- Release: 6 September 1975 – 4 March 1979

Related
- The Two of Us

Two's Company is a British television situation comedy series which ran from 1975 to 1979. Produced by London Weekend Television (LWT) for the ITV network, it starred Elaine Stritch and Donald Sinden.

== Premise ==
Dorothy McNab is an American author residing in London. As she spends most of her days writing, she hires an English butler, Robert Hiller, to help run her Chelsea home. Being the epitome of the English gentleman, Robert does not approve of Dorothy's lurid thriller novels or her American ways. Much of the comedy stems from the banter between the two, as they continually disagree due to their cultural differences and often try to outwit each other.

== History ==
Two's Company was created by Bill MacIlwraith, who also wrote all of the episodes. Although the first and second series were not simulcast nationally in the UK, the third and fourth series were shown in a primetime Sunday evening slot by all ITV stations. It was nominated for a BAFTA Award for "Best Comedy" programme in 1977, and was nominated for four BAFTA Awards in 1979, including "Best Comedy", "Best Graphics" (opening credits sequence) and Stritch and Sinden were each nominated for "Best Light Entertainment Performance".

Stritch and Sinden also performed the series theme song, with lyrics written by Sammy Cahn and music by Denis King, which played during the animated opening credits sequence where Stritch's character is portrayed as a brassy American eagle and Sinden's as a snooty British lion.

After its success in the UK, the series was remade for U.S. television in 1981 as The Two of Us starring Peter Cook and Mimi Kennedy, though this version was less successful and was cancelled the following year. Additionally, the original series was rerun on A&E during the mid-1980s.

In later years, Sinden commented that although Stritch's drinking was problematic during production of the first series of Two's Company, they remained good friends after the show ended and he was saddened by her death in July 2014, aged 89. Sinden himself also died only two months later in September 2014, aged 90.

All four series of Two's Company have been released on DVD in the UK, the US, and Australia.

== Episodes ==
=== Series overview ===
Series	Episodes	Originally released	
Series	Episodes	First released	Last released
1	6	6 September 1975	11 October 1975
Christmas special		25 December 1976	
2	7	10 January 1977	21 February 1977
3	8	22 January 1978	26 March 1978
4	7	14 January 1979	4 March 1979

=== Series 1 (1975) ===
No. overall	No. in series	Title	Directed by	Produced by	Original release date
1	1	"The Bait"	Stuart Allen	Stuart Allen	6 September 1975
Dorothy McNab is looking for a new butler. Robert Hiller knows he's going to take the position, but not until he's secured enough concessions.
2	2	"The Housekeeping"	Stuart Allen	Stuart Allen	13 September 1975
Dorothy is hosting a dinner party for an American Senator to secure his vote on a tax bill for American authors domiciled abroad. Robert ruins the evening having heard from a colleague that the Senator intends to vote against the bill. Featuring: Peter Carlisle as Ed and Helen Horton as Clare
3	3	"Dorothy's Electrician"	Stuart Allen	Stuart Allen	20 September 1975
Robert thinks the electrician that Dorothy has employed is not competent to carry out household repairs. Dorothy does not agree, but when the electrician messes up how will Dorothy save face? Featuring: Tony Selby as Mr. Burton
4	4	"The Patient"	Stuart Allen	Stuart Allen	27 September 1975
Robert falls down the stairs and hurts his ankle. Dorothy takes him to casualty and can't believe how long they have to wait. Featuring: Penelope Keith as Mrs. Philips and Saeed Jaffrey as the Doctor
5	5	"The Romance"	Stuart Allen	Stuart Allen	4 October 1975
Dorothy has Sir Percy and his nephew coming round to take photos to promote her latest book. But when Sir Percy takes a shine to Dorothy will Robert be able to stop watching the cricket on TV to help her? Featuring: Anthony Pedley as Sir Percy and Graham Armitage as Hugh
6	6	"Robert's Mother"	Stuart Allen	Stuart Allen	11 October 1975
Robert's mother is coming to stay and he warns Dorothy that she can be demanding. Dorothy soon discovers that this is the case and works out how to make her leave. Featuring: Joyce Carey as Mrs. Hiller

=== Christmas Special (1976) ===
No. overall	No. in series	Title	Directed by	Produced by	Original release date
7	1	"A Loving Christmas"	John Reardon	Humphrey Barclay	25 December 1976
It's Christmas in the McNab household and both Dorothy and Robert say they're going away for Christmas. Both return to the house to find each other has a friend with them. To make matters worse Dorothy's cousin Clarence turns up uninvited. Featuring: Geraldine Newman as Gillian, Derek Waring as Nigel, John Bay as Clarence.

=== Series 2 (1977) ===
No. overall	No. in series	Title	Directed by	Produced by	Original release date
8	1	"The Reluctant Traveller"	John Reardon	Humphrey Barclay	10 January 1977
Dorothy wants to take Robert to New York. Robert is afraid of flying and wants to go on the QE2. Will he get his way?
9	2	"The Burglary"	John Reardon	Humphrey Barclay	17 January 1977
The McNab residence has been burgled. Robert worries that he will be a suspect because of a valuable painting stolen from his previous place of employment.
10	3	"The Rubbish"	John Reardon	Humphrey Barclay	24 January 1977
Robert has a disagreement with the dustbin men about collecting extra rubbish. Things get out of hand and a council supervisor is called in. Featuring: Bryan Pringle as Sid, Norman Bird as Mr Bunn and Paddy Joyce as Mike
11	4	"The Honeymoon"	John Reardon	Humphrey Barclay	31 January 1977
An American friend of Dorothy's has asked her to patch up some differences that have appeared in her daughter's marriage. Featuring: Ed Bishop as Jack
12	5	"Robert's Record Player"	John Reardon	Humphrey Barclay	7 February 1977
Robert plays his records too loudly making their neighbor Mr Begley come round to complain. He irritates Dorothy and they end up in court. Featuring: George A. Cooper as Mr. Begley
13	6	"The Guests"	John Reardon	Humphrey Barclay	14 February 1977
When Dorothy is out shopping she meets a group of people on their way to India. She invites them back to the house for some food, but there's one problem, none of them are allowed to speak.
14	7	"The Cleaning Ladies"	John Reardon	Humphrey Barclay	21 February 1977
Dorothy and Robert disagree about the type of cleaner to employ. If they can't come to a decision they might have to do their own cleaning. Featuring: Patsy Rowlands as Lil and Andonia Katsaros as Nancy

=== Series 3 (1978) ===
No. overall	No. in series	Title	Directed by	Produced by	Original release date
15	1	"The Invitation"	John Reardon	Humphrey Barclay	22 January 1978
Dorothy and Robert return to find that Dorothy has been invited to lunch with the Queen later that afternoon. Will she get there in time? Featuring: Rosalind Ayres as Joan, Barry Quin as Greg, Patsy Blower as Mary and Eric Mason as Taxi driver
16	2	"The Freezer"	John Reardon	Humphrey Barclay	29 January 1978
Dorothy wants a freezer but Robert doesn't. It's going to take a lot of ingenuity to get him to agree.
17	3	"The Pet"	John Reardon	Humphrey Barclay	5 February 1978
Dorothy wants a dog but Robert doesn't like pets. She gets a dog on trial from a Mrs Shelton. How will Robert react? Featuring: Beryl Reid as Mrs Shelton and Peter Childs as Laundryman
18	4	"The Take-Over Bid"	John Reardon	Humphrey Barclay	12 February 1978
Dorothy's chauffeur Vincent is after Robert's job. Dorothy is tempted but realizes maybe it's better the devil you know. Featuring: Colin Jeavons as Vincent
19	5	"The Virus"	John Reardon	Humphrey Barclay	19 February 1978
Dorothy is in bed with a virus. Robert is looking after her but when he takes to his bed, Dorothy has to look after him.
20	6	"The Critic"	John Reardon	Humphrey Barclay	26 February 1978
Dorothy's book gets a bad review in the newspaper from an anonymous critic. Dorothy is not happy when she finds out it was Robert that wrote the review.
21	7	"The Picnic"	John Reardon	Humphrey Barclay	5 March 1978
It's Dorothy's birthday and Robert is taking her on a picnic. A couple of Dorothy's friends want to tag along but they get lost in convoy.
22	8	"The Politicians"	John Reardon	Humphrey Barclay	26 March 1978
Dorothy has two Members of Parliament as guests and Robert's class prejudice comes to the surface. Featuring: James Villiers as Peter Boatwright and David Ryall as George Gunn

=== Series 4 (1979) ===
No. overall	No. in series	Title	Directed by	Produced by	Original release date
23	1	"The Club"	John Reardon	Humphrey Barclay	14 January 1979
Dorothy and Robert argue about who can control the heating thermostat. Dorothy and Robert agree that if she can enter his exclusively all male club for three hours within three days, she can take control of the heating.
24	2	"The Clergy"	John Reardon	Humphrey Barclay	21 January 1979
Dorothy offers her old dressing table to the boy scouts thinking it's to raise money for charity. When she finds out it's actually for a bonfire she says it's worth £300. It's not long before every charity wants a share.
25	3	"The Salesman"	John Reardon	Humphrey Barclay	28 January 1979
Dorothy and Robert encounter an extremely pushy door to door encyclopedia salesman who won't take no for an answer. Featuring: John Ringham as Neville
26	4	"The Visiting Scots"	John Reardon	Humphrey Barclay	4 February 1979
Dorothy is extremely nervous when her accountant visits to check her books. However, she shouldn't have worried as her accountant says she should be spending more to take advantage of the tax breaks.
27	5	"The Silence"	John Reardon	Humphrey Barclay	11 February 1979
Robert and Dorothy disagree about the type of tiles to get for the kitchen. When Robert buys the tiles he wanted a silence ensues. Things are resolved when Dorothy employs a couple of mediators. Featuring: Alison Steadman as Pamela, Richard O'Callaghan as Richard and George Tovey as Fred
28	6	"The Rolls-Royce"	John Reardon	Humphrey Barclay	25 February 1979
Robert wants Dorothy to buy a Rolls-Royce but Dorothy is having second thoughts. She relents in the end so that they can go to the opera in style.
29	7	"The Friendly Aristocrats"	John Reardon	Humphrey Barclay	4 March 1979
Dorothy is staying as a guest at a country house. Robert is mistaken as her partner and put in the guest suite. Fearing he'll have to stay in the servants' quarters if the truth is discovered, they decide to keep up the pretence. Things get difficult when mutual friends arrive. Featuring: John Savident as Paul and Milton Johns as Charles
