= Matlock (1986 TV series) =

American mystery legal drama series

- Genre: Legal drama; Mystery
- Created by: Dean Hargrove
- Starring: Andy Griffith; Lori Lethin; Alice Hirson; Kene Holliday; Linda Purl; Nancy Stafford; Julie Sommars; Kari Lizer; Clarence Gilyard Jr.; Brynn Thayer; Daniel Roebuck; Carol Huston
- Theme music composer: Dick DeBenedictis
- Composers: Dick DeBenedictis; Artie Kane; William Ross
- Country of origin: United States
- Original language: English
- No. of seasons: 9
- No. of episodes: 193 (+ pilot movie) (list of episodes)

Production
- Executive producers: Fred Silverman; Dean Hargrove (1986–1991); Andy Griffith (1991–1995)
- Running time: 45–48 minutes
- Production companies: The Fred Silverman Company (Note: Known as Intermedia Entertainment Company for episodes of the first season.); Dean Hargrove Productions (Note: Known as Strathmore Productions for the first two seasons.); Viacom Productions

Original release
- Network: NBC
- Release: March 3, 1986 – May 8, 1992
- Network: ABC
- Release: November 5, 1992 – May 4, 1995

Related
- Jake and the Fatman; Diagnosis: Murder

Matlock is an American mystery legal drama television series created by Dean Hargrove and starring Andy Griffith in the title role of criminal defense attorney Ben Matlock. Debuting on March 3, 1986, the series aired on NBC until the sixth-season finale on May 8, 1992; it was moved to ABC on November 5, 1992, continuing there for the remainder of its run until the series finale aired on May 7, 1995. The series was produced by The Fred Silverman Company (formerly Intermedia Entertainment Company until 1986) and Dean Hargrove Productions (formerly Strathmore Productions until 1988) in association with Viacom Productions. This series marked Griffith's return to a series for the first time since The New Andy Griffith Show ended in 1971.

The show's format is similar to that of CBS's Perry Mason (both Matlock and the 1980s Perry Mason television films were created by Dean Hargrove), with Matlock identifying the perpetrators and then confronting them in dramatic courtroom scenes. One difference, however, was that whereas Mason usually exculpated his clients at a pretrial hearing, Matlock usually secured an acquittal at trial from the jury.

A gender flipping reboot, starring Kathy Bates, premiered on CBS on September 22, 2024.

== Premise ==
Matlock centers on Ben Matlock (Andy Griffith), a widowed and highly respected defense attorney known for his folksy demeanor, sharp intellect, and cantankerous personality. Despite his gruff exterior, Matlock is deeply committed to justice. Most episodes culminate in a courtroom confrontation, where Matlock cross-examines a witness—often the actual perpetrator—and methodically exposes the truth. His goal is typically to establish reasonable doubt or to prove his client's innocence outright.

Matlock is portrayed as a graduate of Harvard Law School. After working as a public defender, he opened a private law practice in Atlanta, where he resides in a modest farmhouse in the suburbs. Known for his meticulous investigative approach, Matlock often visits crime scenes to uncover overlooked evidence and develop alternative theories about the case, which usually involves homicide.

A distinctive feature of Matlock's character is his finicky fashion sense; he consistently wears a light gray suit and, over the series' run, drives three successive generations of the all-gray Ford Crown Victoria—a nod to Griffith's longtime association with Ford vehicles, dating back to The Andy Griffith Show.

Matlock is also characterized by his frugality and love of hot dogs, which are depicted as his favorite food throughout the series. This detail is explored humorously in the season eight episode "The Diner". An alternate backstory for his hot dog obsession is presented in a crossover with Diagnosis: Murder (season four, episodes 15–16, "Murder Two"), where Matlock blames Dr. Mark Sloan (Dick Van Dyke) for advising a failed investment in 8-track tapes in 1969 that cost him his $5,000 savings (equivalent to $33,000 in 2024), forcing him into an austere lifestyle.

Despite his thrift, Matlock typically charges a $100,000 retainer fee (equivalent to $240,000 in 2024), usually payable upfront. However, he often adjusts or waives his fee if he believes strongly in a client's innocence or if the client cannot afford to pay. In some cases, he reluctantly accepts pro bono cases. His strict expectations of his staff and investigators, as well as his penny-pinching habits, often serve as sources of comic relief throughout the series.

== Cast ==
=== Main ===
- Andy Griffith as Ben Matlock
- Linda Purl (Lori Lethin in pilot) as Charlene Matlock (season 1), Ben's younger daughter who became a partner to her father before she moved to Philadelphia to set up her own law practice
- Alice Hirson as Hazel (pilot), Matlock's secretary
- Kene Holliday as Tyler Hudson (seasons 1–3; guest season 4), Ben's first private investigator
- Kari Lizer as Cassie Phillips (season 2; recurring season 1), Ben's young file clerk who desired to become his partner after Charlene's departure
- Nancy Stafford as Michelle Thomas (seasons 2–6), an American lawyer living in London who becomes an equal partner to Matlock. She first appeared as a guest in season 1 (episode 6: The Seduction)
- Julie Sommars as Julie March (seasons 3–6; recurring seasons 1–2; guest season 9), a district attorney who becomes a good friend to Ben Matlock
- Clarence Gilyard Jr. as Conrad McMasters (seasons 4–7; guest season 8), Ben's second private investigator who is a former deputy sheriff and a rodeo rider
- Brynn Thayer as Leanne MacIntyre (seasons 7–8; guest season 6), Ben's older daughter who works for her father after Michelle's departure
- Daniel Roebuck as Cliff Lewis (seasons 7–9), Ben's last partner, a recent law school graduate with limited experience; he is the son of Ben's childhood friend, Billy Lewis
- Carol Huston as Jerri Stone (season 9), Ben's last assistant and private investigator with a talent for singing lullabies

=== Recurring ===
- James McEachin as Lieutenant Frank Daniels (season 1), Ben's contact on the Atlanta Police Department
- Michael Durrell as District Attorney Lloyd Burgess (seasons 1–6), chief district attorney for Fulton County, Georgia
- David Froman as Lieutenant Bob Brooks (seasons 1–6), Ben's contact on the Atlanta Police Department
- Richard Newton as Judge Richard Cooksey (seasons 1–6), courtroom judge
- Don Knotts as Les "Ace" Calhoun (seasons 3–6), Ben's next-door neighbor who was once a client in season three
- Warren Frost as Billy Lewis (seasons 6–9), Ben's childhood friend and Cliff's father

== Changes ==
The series premiered with Ben Matlock (played by Andy Griffith) having a law practice with his daughter, Charlene (played by Lori Lethin in the pilot movie; Linda Purl took over the role when the series went to air). Matlock also employed stock market whiz Tyler Hudson (Kene Holliday) as a private investigator. Tyler would often go undercover for Matlock in various guises to gather information. Matlock's most frequent legal adversary was Julie March (Julie Sommars), a Nebraska native. Although their jobs as prosecutor and defense attorney made them professional rivals, their relationship outside of court was very cordial and they often spent time together outside of court with occasional flirtations. Toward the end of the first season, Matlock took on cocky law student Cassie Phillips (played by Kari Lizer) as an office worker.

After the first season ended, Purl departed from the series and her character, Charlene, moved to Philadelphia to start her own law practice. To begin the second season, Matlock went to London to try a case where he met Michelle Thomas (played by Nancy Stafford), a young American lawyer. After the case was over, Michelle followed Matlock to the U.S. and became his new law partner. Cassie stayed on as a file clerk until the end of the season, when she disappeared for reasons never made clear. With Lizer's departure, Julie Sommars became a regular cast member.

Cast of season 2, from left: (top) Kene Holliday, Julie Sommars; (bottom) Kari Lizer, Griffith, Nancy Stafford

Several actors/actresses appeared in the series as different characters prior to becoming regular cast members. In season one's "The Seduction", Stafford played Caryn Nelson/Carole Nathan, a high-class prostitute who was paid off to commit perjury against Matlock's client. In "The Angel", Lizer appeared as Matlock's client, Margaret Danello, a pop star called "Angel". Roebuck played a young physician, Dr. Bobby Shaw, in "The Doctors"; lawyer Alex Winthrop in season three's two-part episode, "The Ambassador"/"The Priest"; and a prosecutor in a two-part episode, "The Assassination", before becoming a cast regular in season seven.

Some actors/actresses appeared as a different character in each appearance on the show. For example, Carolyn Seymour played Christina Harrison Ward in season one ("The Affair", episode 4), Dr. Vanessa Sedgwick in season two ("The Genius", episode 20) and Iris Vogel in season three ("The Psychic", episode 13). Nana Visitor and Roddy McDowall made several guest appearances as well. Holliday was fired after the third season for drug and alcohol abuse, but had a recurring role in season four ("The Best Seller", episode 4 and "The Witness", episode 14). Matlock hired Conrad McMasters (Clarence Gilyard Jr.), a young, former North Carolina deputy sheriff, to be his new detective. Like Tyler, Conrad would also go undercover to gather information about cases. However, the two characters were different in their personalities and approach to the job. Matlock and McMasters became good friends and were alike in many ways.

Don Knotts, who co-starred with Griffith on The Andy Griffith Show, began making frequent appearances as Les "Ace" Calhoun, Matlock's next-door neighbor. Before replacing Stafford at the start of season seven, Brynn Thayer appeared in two season six episodes ("The Suspect", episodes 7–8) as Roxanne Windemere, a rich widow charged with murder with whom Ben became smitten. In the season finale ("The Assassination", episodes 21–22) she appeared as Leanne MacIntyre, Ben's previously unmentioned daughter who takes on the case of a murdered mayor. She joined the cast full-time in season seven. Daniel Roebuck joined Thayer as a new regular for season seven as Cliff Lewis, a naive young lawyer and associate. Warren Frost joined the cast in a recurring role as Billy Lewis, Cliff's father and a personal nemesis from Matlock's past: Ben had abandoned a romance with Billy's sister to pursue his law degree. The move in 1992 to ABC for the remainder of the series caused some cast turnover. Stafford left the series to spend more time with her husband, Larry Myers. Sommars followed, although she would play a recurring role in several later episodes. Knotts followed. With Roebuck joining the cast, Gilyard's role was diminished.

After season seven ended, Gilyard left the series to join the new CBS series Walker, Texas Ranger, although he appeared once in season eight ("The View", episode five). Like Silverman and Hargrove's Perry Mason series revival, Matlock had largely become a series of movies-of-the-week by season nine. Part of the reason for this was Griffith's advancing age; he was 66 and also wanted to spend more time with his family. At the end of season 8, Thayer departed from the series. In the first episode of season nine ("The Accused") Ben tells Billy that Leanne moved to Los Angeles, seems to like her job, and "has a fella." In the final season, Carol Huston joined the series as Jerri Stone, a private investigator helping Cliff in his duties. Like Conrad, Jerri and Ben had shared hobbies including singing. The move also saw a change in filming venue. Shooting in California for its entire run on NBC (which required Griffith to commute from his home in North Carolina to the West Coast), ABC moved production to the EUE/Screen Gems Studios in Wilmington, North Carolina, to ease the travel burden on Griffith. The "whodunit" format was also adjusted to an "inverted detective story" format.

== Episodes ==
Matlock aired a total of 193 episodes across nine seasons and began with a TV-movie. 12 two-hour and 15 two-part episodes of the program were aired. Six of the episodes were clip shows with mostly minor plots that paved the way for scenes from previous stories. Although Griffith appeared in more episodes portraying Sheriff Andy Taylor in The Andy Griffith Show than Ben Matlock in Matlock (the former has 249 episodes, and the latter has 193), he logged more on-screen time as Ben Matlock than he did as Sheriff Andy Taylor due to the length of each show (Matlock ran for 45–48 minutes, while The Andy Griffith Show ran for 25–26 minutes).

Season	Episodes	Originally released			Rank	Rating
Season	Episodes	First released	Last released	Network	Rank	Rating
Pilot		March 3, 1986		NBC	—N/a	20.9
1	23	September 23, 1986	May 12, 1987	NBC	15	18.6
2	24	September 22, 1987	May 3, 1988	NBC	14	17.8
3	20	November 29, 1988	May 16, 1989	NBC	13	17.7
4	24	September 19, 1989	May 8, 1990	NBC	20	16.6
5	22	September 18, 1990	April 30, 1991	NBC	17	15.5
6	22	October 18, 1991	May 8, 1992	NBC	39	12.4
7	18	November 5, 1992	May 6, 1993	ABC	29	13.2
8	22	September 23, 1993	May 19, 1994	ABC	35	12.1
9	18	October 13, 1994	May 4, 1995	ABC	61	10.0

== Program format ==
A few changes were made in the format of the introduction of the episodes. The introduction of characters was essentially the same, with the only changes being the actors for each season. Griffith, Purl, Holliday, Stafford, Gilyard Jr., Thayer, Sommars, Lizer, Roebuck and Huston were all featured in the intros for their respective seasons. The Matlock commercial screen also changed. The early episodes had a scene of Ben Matlock in front of a brown screen; around 1987, this was changed to gray. In 1992, this was changed once again to the same gray, but with a blue square around the "M" in "Matlock." Later in the 1993–1994 season, the commercial screen was removed entirely. Nancy Stafford began appearing in a dual role in many opening credits from season three onwards, both as her main character Michelle Thomas, and the high-class call girl she played in the first season (seen on the witness stand, though her face is obscured).

=== Spin-offs ===
Jake and the Fatman was a spin-off on CBS based on a character who originated in "The Don" (1986), a two-part Matlock episode from season one. William Conrad played prosecutor James L. McShane and Joe Penny played Paul Baron, the son of Matlock's client, Mafia don Nicholas Baron. Executive producers Fred Silverman and Dean Hargrove were responsible for both Matlock and Jake and the Fatman, as well as Diagnosis: Murder, created by Joyce Burditt (which itself was a spin-off of Jake and the Fatman) in 1993, also on CBS; Father Dowling Mysteries in 1988 on NBC and ABC; and the 30 Perry Mason made-for-TV movies from 1985 until 1995 on NBC.

== Home media ==
=== DVD releases ===
CBS Home Entertainment (distributed by Paramount Home Entertainment) has released all nine seasons of Matlock on DVD in Region 1. On April 7, 2015, CBS released Matlock: The Complete Series on DVD in Region 1.

DVD name	Ep #	Release date
The First Season	25	April 8, 2008
The Second Season	24	January 13, 2009
The Third Season	20	July 7, 2009
The Fourth Season	24	March 2, 2010
The Fifth Season	22	July 20, 2010
The Sixth Season	22	January 25, 2011
The Seventh Season	18	February 21, 2012
The Eighth Season	22	February 12, 2013
The Ninth and Final Season	18	July 16, 2013
The Complete Series	195	April 7, 2015

=== Streaming ===
Season one of the series was made available for purchase through Amazon Video. The series is available on demand through Pluto TV, and as of January 15, 2025, all 9 seasons are made available to stream on Paramount+, but was removed in January 14, 2026.

== 2024 series ==
In January 2023, CBS announced development of a new series starring Kathy Bates and Skye P. Marshall, with David Del Rio, Leah Lewis and Jason Ritter in supporting roles; a pilot was ordered that February. In May, it was announced that the show had been officially greenlit with a series order. In February 2024, it was announced that Beau Bridges had joined the cast in the recurring role of Senior. The series was delayed to the 2024–25 television season amidst the 2023 Hollywood labor disputes. The show is set to premiere on September 22, 2024, on CBS and streaming on Paramount+, then start airing in its regular timeslot (Thursday 9pm) on October 17, 2024.

In the new series, the original TV show exists as an in-universe TV series with Bates' Matlock using the same surname as the TV show character as an alias.

== See also ==
- Hawkins—A TV series about a small town Southern defense attorney
- Matlock Police—Australian TV series from 1971 to 1976
