= The Two of Us (1981 TV series) =

American television sitcom

- Genre: Sitcom
- Based on: Two's Company by Bill MacIlwraith
- Developed by: Charlie Hauck
- Directed by: Asaad Kelada; Peter Bonerz
- Starring: Peter Cook; Mimi Kennedy; Oliver Clark; Dana Hill; Tim Thomerson
- Theme music composer: Patrick Williams
- Country of origin: United States
- Original language: English
- No. of seasons: 2
- No. of episodes: 20

Production
- Executive producer: Martin Starger
- Producer: Charlie Hauck
- Running time: 30 minutes
- Production company: Marble Arch Productions

Original release
- Network: CBS
- Release: April 6, 1981 – February 24, 1982

The Two of Us is an American television sitcom starring Peter Cook and Mimi Kennedy that aired on CBS from April 6, 1981, to February 24, 1982. It is a remake of the British LWT sitcom Two's Company (1975–1979).

== Synopsis ==
Cook plays an English butler named Brentwood, who works for a single American mother, Nan Gallagher (Kennedy). Dana Hill played Nan's 12-year-old daughter, Gabby.

== Cast ==
- Peter Cook as Robert Brentwood
- Mimi Kennedy as Nan Gallagher
- Oliver Clark as Cubby Royce
- Dana Hill as Gabby Gallagher
- Tim Thomerson as Reggie Cavanaugh

== Episodes ==
=== Season 1 (1981) ===
No. overall	No. in series	Title	Original release date
1	1	"Nan Meets Brentwood"	April 6, 1981
2	2	"The Slumber Party"	April 13, 1981
3	3	"Old Alf"	April 20, 1981
4	4	"Weekend Away"	April 27, 1981

=== Season 2 (1981–82) ===
No. overall	No. in series	Title	Original release date
5	1	"Nan's Fan"	October 12, 1981
6	2	"Brentwood's Agony"	October 19, 1981
7	3	"Upstairs, Downstairs"	October 26, 1981
8	4	"The Duke of Lawford"	November 2, 1981
9	5	"Big Hand for Brentwood"	November 9, 1981
10	6	"Chicken Marengo"	November 16, 1981
11	7	"A Family Counseled"	November 30, 1981
12	8	"The German Lesson"	December 7, 1981
13	9	"A Man from Brentwood's Past"	December 21, 1981
14	10	"The Christmas Thief"	December 28, 1981
15	11	"Basketball Gabby"	January 4, 1982
16	12	"Butler of the Year"	January 13, 1982
17	13	"Gabby's Birthday Party"	January 10, 1982
18	14	"The Odd Couples"	February 3, 1982
19	15	"Torch Song"	February 17, 1982
20	16	"Brentwood Goes on Strike"	February 24, 1982
