= Sy Rosen =

American producer and screenwriter

- Occupations: Producer, screenwriter
- Years active: 1976–present
- Spouse: Wanda Echevarria Rosen (died. 2021)
- Children: 1

Sy Rosen is an American producer and screenwriter. He created the American sitcom television series Gimme a Break! with Mort Lachman.

== Career ==
Rosen started his career in 1976, first writing a few episodes for the television series The Bob Newhart Show. He also served in the army and graduated from college, in 1969.

In 1980s-2000s, Rosen produced and wrote many shows, including, Taxi, The Wonder Years, Maude, M*A*S*H, The Jeffersons, Rhoda, Sister, Sister, Throb, My Two Dads and Sanford. In 1987, he created the new NBC sitcom television series Roomies, which ran for 8 episodes.

In 2007, Rosen wrote the book The Miracle Group.

In 2018, Rosen screenplayed the short film The Matchmaker, which starred Barbara Bain, Rhea Perlman, Robert Romanus and Bryna Weiss. He explained that the short film was about a man who tries to find his mother a friend in her nursing home, which had also happened to Rosen.
