= Gimme a Break! =

American television sitcom (1981–1987)

- Genre: Sitcom
- Created by: Mort Lachman; Sy Rosen
- Directed by: John Bowab; Hal Cooper; Jim Drake; Linda Day; Dick Harwood; Jules Lichtman; Will Mackenzie; Patrick Maloney; Phil Ramuno; Tony Singletary; Oz Scott; Herbert Kenwith; Howard Storm
- Starring: Nell Carter; Dolph Sweet; Kari Michaelsen; Lauri Hendler; Lara Jill Miller; Howard Morton; John Hoyt; Joey Lawrence; Telma Hopkins; Jonathan Silverman; Rosetta LeNoire; Matthew Lawrence; Paul Sand; Rosie O'Donnell; Alvernette Jimenez
- Theme music composer: Bob Christianson, Bob Garrett, and Marley Sims (first two seasons only); Jay Graydon and Richard Page
- Opening theme: "Gimme a Break" performed by Nell Carter
- Composer: Bob Christianson
- Country of origin: United States
- Original language: English
- No. of seasons: 6
- No. of episodes: 137 (list of episodes)

Production
- Executive producers: Hal Cooper; Mort Lachman; Rod Parker
- Producers: Arthur Julian; Coleman Mitchell; Geoffrey Neigher
- Running time: 24–25 minutes
- Production companies: Mort Lachman and Associates; Alan Landsburg Productions (seasons 1–4); Reeves Entertainment Group (seasons 5–6)

Original release
- Network: NBC
- Release: October 29, 1981 – May 12, 1987

Gimme a Break! is an American television sitcom created by Mort Lachman and Sy Rosen that aired on NBC for six seasons from October 29, 1981, to May 12, 1987. The series starred Nell Carter as the housekeeper for a widowed police chief (Dolph Sweet) and his three daughters.

== Premise ==
In Glenlawn, a fictional suburb in California, Nellie Ruth "Nell" Harper (Nell Carter) agrees to look after the Kanisky household as a special favor to her dying friend Margaret Huffman Kanisky (played in flashback by Sharon Spelman), the wife of police chief Carl Kanisky (Dolph Sweet). More than a mere housekeeper and cook, Nell serves as a parental figure to the chief's three teenaged daughters, Katie (Kari Michaelsen), Julie (Lauri Hendler), and Samantha (Lara Jill Miller). A foster son, Joey (Joey Lawrence), joins the Kanisky household in season three.

Five episodes into the sixth and final season, the show changed locales from Glenlawn to New York City, when Nell, concerned for Joey's welfare after he moved there with his absentee father, traveled there to check on him. She subsequently assumed guardianship of Joey and his younger brother Matthew (played by Joey Lawrence's real-life brother Matthew Lawrence) at their father's request, and was forced to permanently relocate there after Chief Kanisky's father Stanley (John Hoyt) sold the family's Glenlawn home.

Over the six-year run, celebrities often appeared on the show, including singers Whitney Houston, Andy Gibb, Sammy Davis Jr., Ray Parker Jr., and The Pointer Sisters. More often than not, the guest singers would perform a song with Nell on the episodes. During the third season, Pat Sajak guest-starred as himself when Nell and her friend Addy (Telma Hopkins) were contestants on Wheel of Fortune. Other notable guest stars included Milton Berle, Danny Glover, Rue McClanahan, Tony Randall, Helen Hunt, Don Rickles, Gwen Verdon, Dennis Haysbert, Ernie Hudson, Gary Collins, and Elizabeth Berkley.

The episode "Cat Story" was performed and broadcast live on February 23, 1985, as a promotional gimmick, which the cast performed without major incident. An earlier episode (from the 1984–85 season), "Baby of the Family", ranked number 38 on TV Land's list of "The 100 Most Unexpected TV Moments"; it depicted Joey dressing and performing in blackface at Nell's church benefit, a plan hatched by Samantha to retaliate for Nell forbidding her to go on an unchaperoned camping trip.

== Cast ==
=== Main characters ===
- Nell Carter as Nellie Ruth "Nell" Harper was a talented singer from Tuscaloosa County, Alabama, who ran away from home when she was 18. She met and became friends with Margaret Kanisky and promised to look after her family after she had died from cancer. In keeping her promise, Nell took on the role of housekeeper and mother to the kids and remained in the series for the entire 6-year run. She later became a foster mother to Joey Donovan in season three. Nell moved to Greenwich Village in New York City in season six with Joey and Addy, and worked as an assistant editor for a publishing company.
- Dolph Sweet as Police Chief Carl "Chief" Kanisky (seasons 1–4), known simply as "the Chief", was a widower with his three teenaged daughters. He is also the father of Katie, Julie and Samantha. After Dolph Sweet's death on May 8, 1985, his character was written out of the series as also having died, and the show continued with Nell taking over as head of the household.
- Kari Michaelsen as Kathleen "Katie" Kanisky (seasons 1–5) is the Chief's eldest daughter, portrayed as the typical "blonde" of the family. She decided not to go to college and opened a boutique called Katie's Corner. After her boutique went out of business, she was written out of the series in the final season as having obtained a job in San Francisco. Her last appearance was the first episode of season six, in which she was now brunette.
- Lauri Hendler as Julie Kanisky Maxwell (seasons 1–5) is the Chief's middle daughter, portrayed as being very intelligent. She married Jonathan Maxwell at the end of season four and became pregnant in season five. In the season-six premiere, after Nell Maxwell had been born, the new three-member Maxwell family moved to San Jose and was therefore written out of the series.
- Lara Jill Miller as Samantha "Sam" Kanisky (seasons 1–5, recurring in season 6) is the Chief's youngest daughter, portrayed as a typical tomboy in her preteen years, but developed into a boy-crazy teenager. She moved to Warren County, New Jersey, to go to Littlefield College, and had a recurring role in season six.
- John Hoyt as Stanley "Grandpa" Kanisky (seasons 2–6, previously recurring in season 1) is the Chief's grumpy, but lovable Polish immigrant father and the grandfather of Katie, Julie, and Samantha. He moves in with his son and granddaughters following his wife's death in season three. In season six, he moves to New York City, into the same building as Nell, after selling the Kanisky house.
- Joey Lawrence as Joey Donovan (seasons 3–6) eventually becomes Nell's foster son; he starts out working as a con artist to raise money to join his uncle in Chicago. Later, Joey becomes a key cast member. His father Tim Donovan appeared on the show in New Orleans and in New York City. Joey meets his younger brother and moves in with Tim at the beginning of season 6, but is reunited with Nell soon afterwards and moves in with her and Addy in New York City.
- Howard Morton as Officer Ralph Waldo Simpson (seasons 3–5, previously recurring in seasons 1-2) is a not very bright, but lovable police officer who was a subordinate of the Chief's.
- Telma Hopkins as Dr. Adelaide "Addy" Wilson (seasons 4–6, previously recurring in season 3) is Nell's childhood friend, holder of a Ph.D., and a member of Phi Beta Kappa. Addy was chief educational curriculum supervisor for postgraduate students studying for doctorates in history, English, and economic geography in the California university system. She later moved to New York City, where Nell eventually joined her. Although Nell and Addy were friends, they also constantly clashed.
- Jonathan Silverman as Jonathan Maxwell (season 5, previously recurring in season 4) is Julie's boyfriend and later husband, pizzaman, and archeology student. Jonathan went to Mexico on a three-month dig. Jonathan, Julie, and their new baby left for San Jose after season five.
- Rosetta LeNoire as "Mama" Maybelle Harper (season 6, previously recurring in seasons 4-5) is Nell's stern, bitter, and critical mother, who was introduced in season four ("Alabamy Bound: Part 1"). Previously, in season one's "Nell Goes Home" and season three's "A Kanisky Christmas", the character's name was Emma, was played by Hilda Haynes, and was soft-spoken.
- Matthew Lawrence as Matthew Donovan (season 6) is Joey's younger brother, who also lived with Nell and Addy in New York City.
- Rosie O'Donnell as Maggie O'Brien (season 6) is Nell's not-so-bright dental hygienist neighbor in New York City.
- Paul Sand as Marty (season 6) is the landlord of the building where Nell, Addy, Joey, and Matthew lived. He also owned the adjacent restaurant La Gazpacho, where he went by "Esteban".

=== Recurring characters ===
- Alvernette Jimenez as Angie McDaniel is Nell's tall, skinny, and dim-witted friend, the typical airhead with a little girl's voice. The character was eventually written out of the show, but appeared in several episodes between seasons one and four.
- Jane Dulo as Mildred Kanisky (née Wuchetzky) is Stanley Kanisky's wife and Carl's mother; she was also played by Elvia Allman in "Katie the Cheat" and Elizabeth Kerr in "Grandma Fools Around". Dulo played the role in season two. The character died, leaving Stanley a widower in season three.
- Pete Schrum as Ed Kanisky is Carl's brother, an overweight mortician who loves to play practical jokes. Ed was a recurring character in seasons one and two, then got married and was written out of the series.
- Patrick Collins as Tim Donovan is Joey and Matthew's father, a merchant seaman. Joey reunited with Tim in New Orleans in season four (when Tim was played by Fred McCarren). Joey went to live with Tim and Matthew in the beginning of season six, when Tim decided to get a job in New York City. After realizing he could not handle a 9-to-5 job, Tim decided he wanted to go back to sea and Joey returned to Nell and Addy along with Matthew.
- Jack Fletcher as Erwin J. Swackhammer was a man who would annoy the Kanisky household in various ways, the most notable of which occurred when he was the manager of the telephone company and had Nell arrested and jailed. After five episodes, Swackhammer disappeared with no explanation.
- Harrison Page as Hamilton Storm is a news reporter who appeared occasionally during seasons one and two; he appeared more concerned with his appearance than giving the news.

== Broadcast history ==
Season	Time	Nielsen ratings
1981–82	Thursday at 9:30–10:00	#47
1982–83	Saturday at 9:00–9:30 (1982); Thursday at 9:00–9:30 (1983)	#62
1983–84	Thursday at 8:00–8:30	15.4 rating/24 share, #48
1984–85	Saturday at 8:30–9:00 (Episodes 1–9); Saturday at 9:00–9:30 (Episodes 10–25)	14.2 rating/24 share, #41
1985–86	Saturday at 8:00–8:30	16.0 rating/28 share, #36
1986–87	Wednesday at 9:00–9:30 (Episodes 1, 3–15, 17–21); Wednesday at 9:30–10:00 (Episodes 2, 16, 22); Tuesday at 9:00–9:30 (Episodes 23–25)	14.3 rating/22 share, #46

== Production ==
The show was produced by Alan Landsburg Productions (renamed as Reeves Entertainment Group in 1985). The US syndication rights are held by NBCUniversal Syndication Studios, the ultimate successor company to original syndicator MCA TV. Fremantle owns the international rights, as they own Thames Television, which acquired Reeves Entertainment Group in 1990. The creators of the show were Mort Lachman and Sy Rosen. The series was taped at Metromedia Square in Hollywood before a studio audience.

Over its run, the series used two different theme songs. The first was composed by Bob Christianson with lyrics by Bob Garrett and Marley Sims; two versions of this song were used, one for the first season and a new recording for the second. A new theme, with music by Jay Graydon and lyrics by Richard Page, was introduced in the third season and used for the remainder of the show's run. The new theme has similarities to the first but with a more positive attitude. Carter performed both themes.

Carter distanced herself from the show following its run. “I don't want to go to my grave being known as the girl from 'Gimme a Break,’” she told The New York Times in 1988. “That wasn't me; it was just a job.”

== Reception ==
The show received mixed reviews from critics when it premiered. Writing for the Washington Post, Tom Shales wrote an especially scathing review of the pilot episode. “I wish I could sue NBC for the grievous consternation, intestinal distress and aggravated low moaning I have suffered as a result of ‘Gimme a Break,’” Shales wrote, going on to criticize the show’s sex jokes and what he found to be the racial stereotypes embodied by Carter’s character. “If I thought television could get substantially worse than this, I am not sure I would have the courage or desire ever to turn the set on again,” Shales concluded.

By contrast, the New York Times found the show promising, praising the performances of Carter and Sweet and the way the show balanced wisecracks with bits of seriousness. “The abrupt changes in tone are handled adroitly,” John J. O’Connor wrote. “Given some supportive scripts, Miss Carter and Mr. Sweet could insure a good run for this series.”

== Syndication ==
The show has been in syndication since 1985. Reruns have also aired nationally on WWOR EMI Service and USA. U.S. distribution rights are owned by NBCUniversal Syndication Studios, the ultimate successor in interest to previous syndicator MCA TV. Reruns of the series are a mainstay of many of Sinclair Broadcast Group's The CW, MeTV and MyNetworkTV stations, especially in low-traffic time periods, due to the low-cost barter setup of the now defunct The Program Exchange.

Antenna TV aired the show from January 2, 2018, until December 31, 2021. Cozi TV started airing the show from January 3, 2022, to December 2023.

=== Streaming ===
Tubi acquired all seasons of the show on February 1, 2022, and it was available until January 31, 2024.

== Home media ==
=== United States ===
Universal Studios Home Entertainment released a three-disc DVD of the complete first season of Gimme a Break! on February 14, 2006, available in the United States only. The Complete Series is now available in the US.

=== Canada ===
Visual Entertainment (under license from FremantleMedia) released the first two seasons of Gimme a Break! on DVD in Canada in 2006–07. In 2009, VEI announced that they plan on releasing the entire series in a complete series box set in 2010. VEI released Gimme a Break! The Complete Series on DVD in Canada on July 20, 2010. As of 2013, these releases have been discontinued and are out of print.

=== France ===
Originally airing on La Cinq, the series is called Allô Nelly bobo (Hello Nelly bobo) in 1991. Later, as part the kids show Club Dorothée under the title Trois filles à la maison (Three Girls at Home) on TF1 in 1993.

=== Italy ===
Airing on Canale 5, the series is called La piccola grande Nell (The Little Big Nell).

=== UK ===
Simply Media TV Ltd released the first and second series in the UK, although the series has never been broadcast on British television.

== Awards and nominations ==
Nell Carter received two Emmy nominations as Best Actress in a Comedy Series. and two Golden Globe nominations as Best Actress in a Television Series-Comedy or Musical.

Year	Award	Category	Nominee	Result
1982	Primetime Emmy Award	Outstanding Lead Actress in a Comedy Series	Nell Carter	Nominated
1982	Golden Globe Award	Best Actress – Television Series Musical or Comedy	Nell Carter	Nominated
1982	Young Artist Award	Best Young Actress in a Comedy Series	Kari Michaelsen	Nominated
1983	Young Artist Award	Best Young Actress in a Comedy Series	Lauri Hendler	Nominated
1983	Primetime Emmy Award	Outstanding Lead Actress in a Comedy Series	Nell Carter	Nominated
1984	Golden Globe Award	Best Actress – Television Series Musical or Comedy	Nell Carter	Nominated
1984	Young Artist Award	Best Young Actress in a Television Comedy Series	Lauri Hendler	Nominated
1984	Young Artist Award	Best Young Supporting Actor in a Television Comedy Series	Joey Lawrence	Nominated
1984	Young Artist Award	Best Young Supporting Actress in a Television Comedy Series	Lara Jill Miller	Nominated
1985	Young Artist Award	Best Young Actor Starring in a Television Series	Joey Lawrence	Nominated
