= Ivan the Terrible (TV series) =

- Genre: Sitcom
- Created by: Herbert Sargent
- Starring: Lou Jacobi; Christopher Hewett
- Theme music composer: Joe Raposo
- Country of origin: United States
- Original language: English
- No. of seasons: 1
- No. of episodes: 5

Production
- Executive producer: Alan King
- Producer: Rupert Hitzig
- Running time: 30 minutes
- Production company: King-Hitzig Productions

Original release
- Network: CBS
- Release: 21 August – 18 September 1976

Ivan the Terrible is an American sitcom that was broadcast on CBS as a summer replacement series in 1976.

The series parodied American attitudes toward the Soviet Union during the height of the Cold War. Set in Moscow, the sitcom starred Lou Jacobi as a Russian hotel waiter named Ivan Petrovsky and the day-to-day misadventures of Ivan's family plus their Cuban exchange student boarder; all of whom live in a cramped, one-bedroom apartment since the one bedroom is occupied by the family's feral Russian Wolfhound, "Rasputin", frequently heard barking and growling, but never seen in the series.

Also appearing in this series were Christopher Hewett, Phil Leeds, Alan Cauldwell, Despo Diamantidou, and, in her TV series debut, Nana Visitor (billed under her birth name, Nana Tucker). Harvey Korman appeared as a Soviet bureaucrat in an uncredited cameo at the close of each episode.

Only five episodes of Ivan the Terrible were broadcast on CBS during the late summer of 1976. Alan King was the series' executive producer.

== Cast ==
- Lou Jacobi as Ivan Petrovsky
- Christopher Hewett as Federov
- Caroline Kava as Sonia Petrovsky
- Alan Cauldwell as Nikolai Petrovsky
- Matthew Barry as Sasha Petrovsky
- Maria Karnilova as Olga Petrovsky
- Nana Tucker as Svetlana Petrovsky

== Episodes ==
No.	Title	Directed by	Written by	Original release date
1	"Ivan's Out of Work"	Peter H. Hunt	Michael Barrie, Jim Mulholland	August 21, 1976
2	"Episode 2"	Unknown	Unknown	August 28, 1976
3	"The Very Loud Family"	Peter H. Hunt	Michael Barrie, Jim Mulholland	September 4, 1976
4	"Episode 4"	Unknown	Unknown	September 11, 1976
5	"Episode 5"	Unknown	Unknown	September 18, 1976
