= Likely Stories =

- Genre: Comedy anthology series
- Starring: Various
- Country of origin: United States
- Original language: English
- No. of episodes: 4

Production
- Producers: David Jablin; Christopher Guest (Vol. 1)
- Production company: Various

Original release
- Network: On TV (Vol. 1); Cinemax (Vols. 2-4)
- Release: September 11, 1981 – August 5, 1983

Likely Stories is a series of anthology comedy specials broadcast in the early 1980s. There were four volumes, with each one consisting of short films by different directors. The first volume was broadcast on the subscription service On TV in 1981, and volumes 2-4 were broadcast on Cinemax in 1983.

== Description ==
The series was known for giving full creative freedom to its filmmakers and was notable for featuring the directorial debuts of Rob Reiner, Christopher Guest, Danny DeVito, Billy Crystal, and Harry Shearer. The short films starred various notable actors, including DeVito, Crystal, Shearer, Guest, Reiner, Paul Reubens, Rhea Perlman, Tony Danza, George Wendt, John Ratzenberger, Michael McKean, and Bruno Kirby. David Jablin independently financed and produced the first volume in 1981, alongside fellow producer Christopher Guest. One installment features Christopher Guest, Michael McKean, and Harry Shearer's first mockumentary together, with Guest playing a precursor to his Waiting for Guffman character corky St. Clair. Another short film, in which Guest and McKean played their Spinal Tap characters Nigel Tufnel and David St. Hubbins playing guitar and chatting in their hotel room, was made for this series but never aired. Cinemax ordered three more volumes, which were produced by Jablin. DeVito's short film, "The Selling of Vince D'Angelo," led to him making his first feature film The Ratings Game.

== Episodes ==
No.	Title	Original release date
1	"Likely Stories, Vol. 1"	September 11, 1981
Short films: Tommy Rispoli: A Man and His Music: A documentary on Frank Sinatra fan and limo driver Tommy Rispoli. This short eventually evolved into Kirby's limo driver character Tommy Pischedda in This Is Spinal Tap.: Starring: Bruno Kirby and Rob Reiner; Written by: Rob Reiner & Bruno Kirby; Directed by: Rob Reiner; Dead Ringer: A satire of film noir movies with Christopher Guest starring in every role.: Written by: Christopher Guest and Matt Neuman; Starring: Christopher Guest; Directed by: Christopher Guest; The Making Of You Wouldn't Believe Our World: A making of documentary for an industrial video for an evil conglomerate. This is Shearer, Guest, and McKean's first mockumentary together, and Guest plays a choreographer very similar to his Waiting for Guffman character Corky St. Clair.: Starring: Michael McKean, Marcia Strassman, Harry Shearer, and Christopher Guest; Original Music by: Paul Shaffer & Harry Shearer; Written/Directed by: Harry Shearer; Who's On First?: A Who's on First-inspired sketch about a music promoter trying to tell an advertising exec about new rock bands. Earlier versions of this sketch was previously performed on a Credibility Gap album and in the sketch comedy film Cracking Up.: Starring: David L. Lander and Harry Shearer; Written/Directed by: Harry Shearer; In Someone's Sneakers: Another adaptation of a Credibility Gap sketch, this one is a parody of Rod McKuen's poetry.: Starring: Stephen Collins and Amy Stryker; Written by: Harry Shearer, Michael McKean, David L. Lander, and Richard Beebe; Directed by: Christopher Guest; Reagan Rap: A Claymation music video of Ronald Reagan rapping.: Starring: Harry Shearer (voice only); Written by: Harry Shearer
2	"Likely Stories, Vol. 2"	May 27, 1983
Short films: The Selling of Vince D'Angelo: A comedy about a corrupt New Jersey Congressman running for Senator. This short received critical acclaim years later for being prescient about Donald Trump's presidency.: Starring: Danny DeVito, Rhea Perlman, and Vincent Schiavelli; Written by: Jim Mulholland & Michael Barrie; Directed by: Danny DeVito; School, Girls & You!: Starring: Paul Reubens; Written/Directed by: David Wechter; Elephant Man Musical: Written/Directed by: Bruce Kimmel; Please Stand By: Written by: Charles Reskin, David Jablin, and Lee Biondi; Directed by: David Jablin
3	"Likely Stories, Vol. 3"	July 1, 1983
Short films: Heartbreaker: Original Song by: Bruce Kimmel; Directed by: David Jablin; Split Decision: Starring: Billy Crystal and Christopher Guest; Written by: Billy Crystal and Christopher Guest; Directed by: Billy Crystal; Our Hollywood Vacation: Starring: Richard Belzer; Written by: Lee Biondi; Directed by: Richard Goldstone; Reagan's Nightmare: Written by: David Jablin and Lee Biondi; Directed by: Peter Wallach; Barry in Concert: Written/Directed by: Bruce Kimmel; Trip to Tomorrow: Written/Directed by: David Wechter
4	"Likely Stories, Vol. 4"	August 5, 1985
Short films: A Lovely Way to Spend an Evening: Starring: Robert Costanzo, John Megna, Frank Sivero, Charlie Stavola, George Wendt, Tony Danza, John Ratzenberger, Vincent Schiavelli; Written/Directed by: Danny DeVito; Focus on Fishko: Starring: Howard Hesseman; Written by: Jim Mulholland & Michael Barrie; Directed by: Peter Bonerz
