= Favorite Deadly Sins =

- Genre: Comedy
- Written by: Lust: Ann Lembeck; Greed: Jim Mulholland; Michael Barrie; Anger: Lee Biondi
- Directed by: David Jablin; Denis Leary
- Starring: Joe Mantegna; Denis Leary; Andrew Clay; Cassidy Rae; Brian Keith; William Ragsdale; Allan Rich; Farrah Forke; Annabella Sciorra; Tanya Pohlkotte
- Music by: Adam Roth (Lust); Christopher Tyng (Greed and Anger)
- Country of origin: United States
- Original language: English

Production
- Executive producers: David Jablin; James P. Jimirro
- Producer: Peter Manoogian
- Production locations: Los Angeles; New York City
- Cinematography: Tony C. Jannelli (segment "Lust"); Jamie Thompson (segments "Greed", "Anger")
- Editors: Christopher Ellis (segments "Greed", "Anger"); Michelle Gorchow (segment "Lust")
- Running time: 99 min.
- Production companies: Imagination Productions; J2 Communications; Showtime Networks

Original release
- Network: Showtime
- Release: November 12, 1995

National Lampoon's Favorite Deadly Sins is a 1995 comedy TV-film. It is a trilogy of short episodes about the foundation of show business: Lust, Greed and Anger. It stars Andrew Clay, Denis Leary and Joe Mantegna. Lust was written by Leary's wife, Ann Lembeck. It is the directorial debut of Denis Leary. It was nominated for Best Casting for TV Nighttime Special: Artios award in Casting Society of America. The movie was shot in Los Angeles, California and New York City. Denis Leary won Best Directing in Comedy CableACE Award for this film.

== Plot ==
The film that consists of three separate stories, each focusing on one of the deadly sins. Each story is independent but linked by the common theme of exploring the darker aspects of human nature.

1. Lust: A security guard spies on his married neighbour and fantasizes with having an affair with her.

2. Greed: A wealthy producer helps a woman to commit murder in order to make a movie about it.

3. Wrath: A man's rage and violent tendencies escalate until he loses control, wreaking havoc on his own life and those around him.
