= Al Lohman =

American radio personality

Al Lohman (January 15, 1933, Sergeant Bluff, Iowa – October 14, 2002, Rancho Mirage, California) was a personality and comedian with a long career in American radio from the 1950s through the 1980s and into the 1990s. Among his early career stops was a stint as morning man at New York top-40 station WABC (AM) when it first adopted a pop music format in 1960. But he's best remembered as a Los Angeles, California radio personality who, along with Roger Barkley, had the top-rated morning drive The Lohman and Barkley Show on KFI Los Angeles through most of the 1970s and early 1980s.

Their fame extended beyond the Los Angeles area, as the duo were frequent guests on The Ed Sullivan Show and were hosts of two short-lived game shows. The first was a 1969 NBC daytime series, Lohman & Barkley's Name Droppers, while the second was a syndicated 1979 entry, Bedtime Stories.

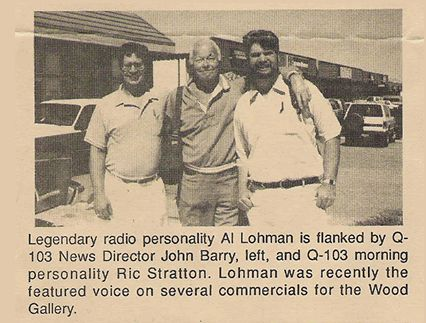
Al Lohman in 1990

== The "cast of characters" ==
Audiences tuned in by the thousands to hear Lohman's quick wit and vast array of character voices play against Barkley's straight man routine. Among Lohman’s characters were the obsequious con-man and alleged farm expert “Maynard Farmer,” whose toadying “That there’s the finest (whatever) that I’ve ever seen there, sir” won him numerous undeserved rewards; “Otis Elevator”, a good-natured handyman; "Judge Roy Bean," a hanging judge, former big band leader and supposed ex-member of the Bee Gees; and human interest reporter “Ted J. Balogna” and his wife “W. Eva Schneider-Balogna”, the poetry lady who seemed never to have any poetry, who supposedly drove to the Wilshire Boulevard studio each morning on Ted’s tractor (and later, a fire engine with W. clinging precariously to the back) from their home in a tree house in Brawley, a real town in Imperial County, nearly two hundred miles (320 km) away. These characters and others were also regular occurrences in a segment called "Light Of My Life," a spoof of daytime soap operas.

One character had a more lasting impact than the others. "Dominic Longo" was the real name of one of the show's sponsors, the owner of a fledgling Toyota dealership in nearby El Monte. The commercials for the dealership were live, mostly ad-libbed and might run as long as two minutes. Roger Barkley "interviewed" Lohman's Mafioso-sounding Longo in the commercials. Dominic Longo didn't simply "wheel and deal." Instead, he "whelt and dealt like no one ever whelt and dealt before." Longo also didn't habla español. He "hobbled spaniels," and so on. The commercials were an incredible success and played a huge part in helping make Longo Toyota the nation's largest Toyota dealer.

Among the more outrageous spoofs given its subject matter was a series of recurring commercials for the fictitious "Doc in the Box" medical group with their promise of "drive-thru vasectomies." The name in turn was a spoof of the American fast food chain, Jack in the Box.

== The unexpected split and post-radio contributions ==
In 1986, Roger Barkley suddenly and unexpectedly quit the duo after twenty-two years, much to Lohman's shock and surprise. Barkley left KFI for a solo stint at beautiful music format KJOI-FM 99 (now KYSR) till 1989 and in the fall of 1990 teamed with Ken Minyard on talk radio KABC to replace the just retired Bob Arthur as co-host of the morning drive show The Ken and Bob Company, a play on the station's call letters, rechristened as The Ken and Barkley Company with his arrival. Lohman and Barkley never spoke again after that. Lohman stayed at KFI and teamed for a while with Gary Owens, a Los Angeles personality best known as the wisecracking announcer on the Laugh-In television show.

Although Lohman and Barkley's morning KFI show was mostly talk and skits, an occasional tune was played, probably to give the guys a restroom break. In a later Los Angeles Times article regarding his sudden exit from KFI, Barkley was quoted as saying that he warned their program director that their constant playing of the same Eagles songs over and over was very aggravating to him. He said if he heard Hotel California one more time that he might just get up and walk out one day. He also alluded to Lohman's increasing undisciplined ways including a growing tendency to not be at the station in time for the start of the show. Obviously Barkley was simply tiring of the situation. Years later on the Los Angeles Ken and Barkley KABC radio show, when Ken Minyard mentioned Al Lohman, Barkley remarked "he says that I destroyed his career." Ironically, Barkley went through a bit of the same. The Ken and Barkley show was dropping in ratings in the very competitive LA morning market, and Barkley was dropped too, though Minyard continued on with a new format. He said that Barkley was very upset, but that the station demanded a change.

In 1989, KFI brought Lohman back and teamed him with radio legend Gary Owens. They created "L.A.'s morning show". It was produced by Jeff Gehringer. The show, which featured comedy and celebrity interviews, lasted for 18 months.

In the early 1990s, Lohman semi-retired to Palm Springs where he hosted a morning show on easy listening KPLM-FM. Upon the station's move to a contemporary country music format, Lohman moved his morning show to KCMJ AM (now KNWQ), Palm Springs' oldest radio station.

Lohman also appeared in film and was credited as simply "Lohman" for his parts as a film critic in the 1987 comedy Amazon Women on the Moon (Roger Barkley played alongside him and was credited as "Barkley") and the narrator of the 1988 comedy, Spies, Lies & Naked Thighs.

On October 28, 1999, Lohman appeared as part of an all-star panel of Los Angeles radio legends at the Museum of Television and Radio in Beverly Hills, CA. At the beginning of the event, recorded bits from each personality's past was played to introduce them. When Lohman was introduced, a segment of the Lohman and Barkley show called "Seven Second Delay" was played. After Lohman was brought on stage, he stated: "When you were playing the clips, that hit me, what a talented group of talented people I'm associated with. And including, in all fairness, I re-realized what an outstanding straight man Roger Barkley was" (Barkley had died two years prior). The house erupted into applause.

Al Lohman died October 14, 2002, at age 69 of complications from bladder cancer. Bandleader Ray Conniff died at about the same time, and while Conniff's obituary in the Los Angeles Times rated an entire column, Lohman's took up nearly three pages.

His partnership with Roger Barkley earned Lohman a star on the Hollywood Walk of Fame, the only Palm Springs radio personality so honored.

== Discography ==
- Light Of My Life Volume One - The Breath of Dr. Duncan & Doc In The Box (LP and Cassette)
- Light Of My Life Volume Two - The Arrest Of Dr. Duncan & Mouse In The Hole (LP and Cassette)
- Lohman & Barkley's Greatest Hits, Vol. 7 (LP, MGM Records #M3F-4956)
