= The Selling of Vince D'Angelo =

- Directed by: Danny DeVito
- Story by: Danny DeVito; Michael Barrie; Jim Mulholland
- Produced by: David Jablin
- Starring: Danny DeVito
- Release date: 1982
- Running time: 21 minutes
- Country: United States
- Language: English

The Selling of Vince D'Angelo is a 1982 American short television film directed by and starring Danny DeVito.

== Cast ==
- Danny DeVito as Vince D'Angelo
- Tim Thomerson as Pete Harrison
- Rhea Perlman as Mrs. D'Angelo
- Jason Hervey as Vince's Son
- Joe Santos as Vince's Left Hand Man
- Vincent Schiavelli as Vince's Right Hand Man
