= A Place to Be Loved =

1993 American television film by Sandy Smolan

- UK DVD cover with alternative title
- Genre: Biography; Drama; Family
- Written by: Blair Ferguson
- Directed by: Sandy Smolan
- Starring: Richard Crenna; Rhea Perlman; Linda Kelsey; Cotter Smith; Joycelyn O'Brien; Tom Guiry
- Music by: W. G. Snuffy Walden
- Country of origin: United States
- Original language: English

Production
- Executive producer: Beth Polson
- Producer: Randy T. Siegel
- Cinematography: Neil Roach
- Editor: Jim Oliver
- Running time: 95 minutes
- Production companies: Corapeake Productions; Procter & Gamble Productions; The Polson Company; World International Network

Original release
- Network: CBS
- Release: April 4, 1993

A Place to Be Loved is a 1993 American biographical drama television film directed by Sandy Smolan, written by Blair Ferguson, and starring Richard Crenna and Rhea Perlman. It was released in the United Kingdom under the title Shattered Family. The film is based on the story of Gregory Kingsley, who was the first American child to legally sever ties with a parent at the age of twelve. It was broadcast on CBS on April 4, 1993.

== Plot summary ==
Gregory Kingsley is a boy who is abused by his father and placed with social services by his mother. The foster family he is put into proves to be the type of nurturing environment he needs. He ends up taking his mother to court to have her parental rights revoked, in the hopes of being adopted by his foster family.

== Cast ==
- Richard Crenna as George Russ
- Rhea Perlman as Jerri Blair
- Linda Kelsey as Liz Russ
- Cotter Smith as Mike Caldwell
- Cyril O'Reilly as Ralph Kingsley
- Jocelyn O'Brien as Rachel Kingsley
- Sam Anderson as Judge Thomas S. Kirk
- Amy Aquino as Debby Hunter
- Tom Guiry as Gregory Kingsley
- David Lipper as Robert Russ
- Michelle Collins as Julie

== Critical reception ==
Todd Everett of Variety praised the performances of Crenna, Perlman, Kelsey, and Guiry. He said the "strongest feature of Blair Ferguson's script may be its clarification of complicated and precedent-setting legal issue", while its "weakest point is its black-and-white contrast of the Kingsley and Russ parents; we can almost see halos above the heads of George and Liz (Kelsey), as Ralph and (especially) Rachel Kingsley twirl their mustache".
