= Martin Brest =

American film director (born 1951)

- Born: August 8, 1951 (age 75); The Bronx, New York, U.S.
- Education: New York University (BFA); American Film Institute (MFA)
- Occupations: Film director; producer; screenwriter
- Notable work: Beverly Hills Cop; Midnight Run; Scent of a Woman; Meet Joe Black; Going in Style; Hot Dogs for Gauguin; Gigli

Martin Brest (born August 8, 1951) is an American film director, screenwriter, and producer. After his feature debut, Going in Style (1979), he directed the action comedies Beverly Hills Cop (1984) and Midnight Run (1988), which were critical and commercial hits. He then directed Scent of a Woman (1992), starring Al Pacino, who won the Academy Award for Best Actor for his performance, and earned Brest nominations for Best Director and Best Picture.

He followed up with Meet Joe Black (1998), which received mixed reviews. Brest's next film was Gigli (2003). After disagreements between Brest and Revolution Studios, creative control was taken from him, resulting in a radically rewritten and reshot version, which became his first and only unprofitable film, a box-office bomb that was widely panned. It remains his last film to date.

== Early life and education ==
Brest was born to Eastern European Jewish immigrant parents in a working-class neighborhood in the Bronx in 1951. He was influenced by watching The Honeymooners as a child, saying in a 2023 interview, "I was a kid watching it in a household that was economically not that different than the one in the show. I felt like it was a show made for my neighborhood. And that character of Ralph Kramden really touched me, that angry soul whose spirit blossoms".

Brest graduated from Stuyvesant High School in 1969 and from New York University's School of the Arts in 1973. His NYU student film, Hot Dogs for Gauguin (1972), starring a then unknown Danny DeVito and with a small part by then unknown Rhea Perlman, was one of 25 films chosen in 2009 by the National Film Registry of the Library of Congress to "be preserved as cultural, artistic and/or historical treasures" and is in the Museum of Modern Art's permanent collection. While attending the AFI Conservatory Brest wrote and directed a feature-length student film, Hot Tomorrows, which the Washington Post called "one of the most original and exciting movies of the decade." He graduated the AFI with a Master of Fine Arts in 1977.

== Career ==
Brest's major studio debut was Going in Style (1979), starring George Burns, Art Carney, and Lee Strasberg. Brest was then hired to direct WarGames (1983), starring Matthew Broderick, but he was fired three weeks into production amid conflicts with the film's executive producer and replaced by John Badham.

The dismissal from WarGames left Brest pessimistic about his career until Don Simpson and Jerry Bruckheimer recruited him to direct Beverly Hills Cop (1984), starring Eddie Murphy. The film grossed over $300 million worldwide and received Golden Globe nominations for Best Motion Picture (Musical or Comedy) and Best Actor (Motion Picture Musical or Comedy, Eddie Murphy) as well as an Academy Award nomination for Best Original Screenplay. In 2024 it became the second of Brest's films to be chosen by the National Film Registry of the Library of Congress to "be preserved as cultural, artistic and/or historical treasures."

Brest was in pre-production for Rain Man (1988) when he cast Tom Cruise for the role opposite Dustin Hoffman. After leaving the project, Barry Levinson eventually directed the film.

Brest's next film was the action-comedy Midnight Run (1988), starring Robert De Niro and Charles Grodin. The film was another critical and commercial success, earning Brest another Golden Globe Award nomination for Best Motion Picture, Musical or Comedy and De Niro a Best Actor Motion Picture – Musical or Comedy nomination.

Brest's work on Scent of a Woman (1992) earned him a Golden Globe Award for Best Motion Picture – Drama. The film also won Golden Globes for Al Pacino and screenwriter Bo Goldman and a Best Supporting Actor nomination for Chris O'Donnell. It received four Academy Award nominations: Best Picture, Best Director, Best Screenplay (Adapted), with Pacino winning Best Actor.

Brest's next film, Meet Joe Black (1998), starring Brad Pitt and Anthony Hopkins, was a loose remake of 1934's Death Takes a Holiday. The film had an American box-office return of $44.6 million, taking in an additional $98.3 million overseas for a worldwide total of $142.9 million.

Brest wrote and directed Gigli (2003), starring Ben Affleck and Jennifer Lopez. During filming, production company Revolution Studios took creative control from him, resulting in a radically rewritten and reshot version. It became one of the more notorious films of its time, widely panned by critics. A 2014 article in Playboy observed that in the then-eleven years since Gigli's release, Brest "went Full Salinger", appearing to have left the entertainment industry completely, without any further credits or major public appearances. In 2021, he appeared as a featured guest at a screening of Beverly Hills Cop and Midnight Run in Los Angeles, where he was interviewed by fellow filmmaker Paul Thomas Anderson. In 2023, he gave an interview to Variety in which he reflected:

Once [Gigli] happened, I thought I'll never be invited back [to make more films]. Second, I would never be able to operate with the kind of control that a director, I feel, needs and deserves. So that felt like a clear signal it was time for me to back away. I had a good run, and I enjoyed success and freedom, and that was fantastic. I would've liked it to go on longer, but everybody likes everything to go on longer.

Brest has received the American Film Institute's Franklin J. Schaffner Achievement Award, which "celebrates the recipient's extraordinary creative talents and artistic achievements."

His essays about art and artists have appeared in various books.

== Awards and nominations ==
Institution	Year	Category	Work	Result
Academy Awards	1993	Best Picture	Scent of a Woman	Nominated
Academy Awards	1993	Best Director	Scent of a Woman	Nominated
Golden Globe Awards	1993	Best Motion Picture, Drama	Scent of a Woman	Won
Golden Globe Awards	1985	Best Motion Picture, Musical or Comedy	Beverly Hills Cop	Nominated
Golden Globe Awards	1989	Best Motion Picture, Musical or Comedy	Midnight Run	Nominated
American Film Institute	1994	Franklin J. Schaffner Achievement Award	—N/a	Won
Jupiter Awards	1986	Best International Film	Beverly Hills Cop	Nominated
Producers Guild Film Awards	1993	Best Theatrical Motion Picture	Scent of a Woman	Nominated
Valladolid International Film Festival	1988	Golden Spike	Midnight Run	Nominated
Venice Film Festival	1980	Golden Lion	Going in Style	Nominated

Two of Brest's films, Hot Dogs for Gauguin and Beverly Hills Cop, have been entered into the National Film Registry of the U.S. Library of Congress.

== Filmography ==
Year	Title	Director	Producer	Writer	Editor	Notes
1972	Hot Dogs for Gauguin	Yes	Yes	Yes	Yes	NYU student film
1977	Hot Tomorrows	Yes	Yes	Yes	Yes	AFI student film
1979	Going in Style	Yes	No	Yes	No	
1983	WarGames	Uncredited	No	No	No	Replaced by John Badham
1984	Beverly Hills Cop	Yes	No	No	No	
1988	Midnight Run	Yes	Yes	No	No	
1992	Scent of a Woman	Yes	Yes	No	No	
1993	Josh and S.A.M.	No	Yes	No	No	
1998	Meet Joe Black	Yes	Yes	No	No	
2003	Gigli	Yes	Yes	Yes	No	

Acting roles

Year	Title	Role	Notes
1972	Hot Dogs for Gauguin	Man on Ferry	
1982	Fast Times at Ridgemont High	Dr. Miller	
1984	Beverly Hills Cop	"bathrobe" Hotel Clerk	Uncredited
1985	Spies Like Us	Drive-In Security Guard	
1988	Midnight Run	Airline Ticket Clerk	Uncredited
