= Amazon Women on the Moon =

1987 science fiction comedy film

- Theatrical release poster
- Directed by: Joe Dante; Carl Gottlieb; Peter Horton; John Landis; Robert K. Weiss
- Written by: Michael Barrie; Jim Mulholland
- Produced by: John Landis; Robert K. Weiss
- Starring: Rosanna Arquette; Paul Bartel; Ralph Bellamy; Carrie Fisher; Sybil Danning; Griffin Dunne; Steve Forrest; Monique Gabrielle; Steve Allen; Steve Guttenberg; Arsenio Hall; Howard Hesseman; Lou Jacobi; Ed Begley, Jr.; Russ Meyer; Kelly Preston; Henny Youngman; B.B. King
- Cinematography: Daniel Pearl
- Edited by: Malcolm Campbell
- Music by: Ira Newborn
- Production company: Hollywood Road Films
- Distributed by: Universal Pictures
- Release date: September 18, 1987
- Running time: 85 minutes
- Country: United States
- Language: English
- Budget: $5 million
- Box office: $548,696

Amazon Women on the Moon is a 1987 American satirical science-fiction sketch comedy film that parodies the experience of watching low-budget films on late-night television. The film, featuring a large ensemble cast with cameo appearances by film and television stars, as well as some nonactors, was written by Michael Barrie and Jim Mulholland; it takes the form of a compilation of 21 comedy sketches directed by five different directors: Joe Dante, Carl Gottlieb, Peter Horton, John Landis and Robert K. Weiss.

The title Amazon Women on the Moon refers to the central film-within-a-film, a spoof of science-fiction films from the 1950s that borrows heavily from Queen of Outer Space (1958) starring Zsa Zsa Gabor, itself a film that recycles elements of earlier science-fiction works such as Cat-Women of the Moon (1953), Fire Maidens from Outer Space (1955) and Forbidden Planet (1956).

Landis had previously directed The Kentucky Fried Movie (1977), which employed a similar sketch anthology format.

== Plot ==
Fictional television station WIDB-TV (Channel 8) experiences problems with its late-night airing of science-fiction classic Amazon Women on the Moon, a 1950s B movie in which Queen Lara and Captain Nelson battle exploding volcanoes and man-eating spiders on the Moon. Waiting for the film to resume, an unseen viewer begins channel surfing—simulated by bursts of white noise—through late-night cable television, with the various sketches representing the programming found on different channels. The viewer intermittently returns to Channel 8, where Amazon Women on the Moon continues airing before faltering once more.

The segments feature:

- A man who experiences a series of mishaps around his apartment before falling through a window.
- Model Taryn Steele who goes about her daily routine in Laguna Beach, California, completely naked, without attracting any attention.
- A man named Murray, who is zapped into the television and wanders through films such as King Kong and appears in other sketches, including the Huey Lewis and the News music video for "If This Is It", screaming for his wife Selma to help him.
- Brenda and Henry Landers, a couple dealing with eccentric doctor Raymond, who has lost their baby and tries to fool them with a Mr. Potato Head and a hand puppet.
- Sy Swerdlow, who presents an advertisement for his service that involves stapling carpet to men's heads to replace lost hair, a parody of Hair Club for Men ads hosted by Sy Sperling.
- Don "No Soul" Simmons and B.B. King in a public-service appeal for "blacks without soul". Simmons later appears in a commercial for a compilation CD of bland love songs sung, turning "a personal affliction into a recording career".
- Karen, a woman who asks her blind date Jerry for identification and runs a report that reveals intimate details about his love life.
- Henry Silva is the host of Bullshit or Not?, a spoof of Ripley's Believe It or Not! with Jack Palance and In Search of.... Silva proposes that Jack the Ripper was actually the Loch Ness Monster.
- Harvey Pitnik is a man who dies from a heart attack after watching a scathing review of his life by two film critics, Jonathan Herbert and Marc Frankel, parodying Gene Siskel and Roger Ebert and is then roasted at his funeral by Steve Allen, Henny Youngman, Slappy White, Charlie Callas, Jackie Vernon, Rip Taylor and even his own wife Bernice. The funeral is held over for weeks.
- "Video Pirates" raid an MCA Home Video ship, uncover many videotapes and laserdiscs and begin illegally bootlegging them.
- Griffin is the son of the Invisible Man, who believes that he has replicated his father's formula, but is in fact fully visible. When he visits the pub naked, he is arrested for indecent exposure.
- Felix Van Dam is the director of an art museum that has lost its lease and must sell its complete collection at closeout prices, including the Mona Lisa and the United States Declaration of Independence.
- A trailer is shown for First Lady of the Evening, a film based on a sleazy romance novel in which president Harrison Chandler's first lady is a former hooker.
- George is an embarrassed teenager trying to purchase condoms for his date at a neighborhood pharmacy but finds himself at the center of a celebration because he is the condom company's billionth customer.
- Ray is a man renting a personalized date video in which his date Sherrie romances him by his name and is then shot by her boyfriend Frankie, who turns the gun on himself. The police arrive at Ray's house and arrest him.
- Reckless Youth is an epilogue at the end of the credits, with a black-and-white film warning of the dangers of social diseases in the style of Reefer Madness.

=== Alternative versions ===
An alternative version of the "Pethouse Video" sketch was filmed for the television broadcast of the film, with Taryn in lingerie rather than appearing naked throughout the segment. However, most European television broadcasts of the film retained the original theatrical version. Bullshit or Not? was retitled Baloney or Not? for the television version.

The American television edit also features an additional bridging sequence between the death of Harvey and his subsequent celebrity roast in which mortician Rick Raddnitz convinces Bernice to have the celebrity roast as part of the funeral. Her performance receives such strong feedback that it becomes a series lasting for weeks.

The DVD release features an unreleased sketch titled "The Unknown Soldier". Some television broadcasts of the film featured the sketches "Peter Pan Theater" and "The French Ventriloquist's Dummy", which were not present in the theatrical version.

== Cast ==
"Mondo Condo" (directed by John Landis):

- Arsenio Hall as Apartment Victim

"Pethouse Video" (directed by Carl Gottlieb):

- Donald F. Muhich as Easterbrook
- Monique Gabrielle as Taryn Steele

"Murray in Videoland" (directed by Robert K. Weiss):

- Lou Jacobi as Murray
- Erica Yohn as Selma
- Debby Davison as Weatherperson
- Rob Krausz as Floor Manager
- Phil Hartman as Baseball Announcer
- Corey Burton as Anchorman

"Hospital" (directed by Landis):

- Michelle Pfeiffer as Brenda Landers
- Peter Horton as Harry Landers
- Griffin Dunne as Dr. Raymond
- Brian Ann Zoccola as Nurse

"Hairlooming" (directed by Joe Dante):

- Joe Pantoliano as Sy Swerdlow
- Stanley Brock as Customer

Amazon Women on the Moon (directed by Weiss):

- Corey Burton as TV Announcer
- Steve Forrest as Captain Steve Nelson
- Robert Colbert as "Blackie"
- Joey Travolta as Butch
- Forrest J Ackerman as US President
- Sybil Danning as Queen Lara
- Lana Clarkson as Alpha Beta
- Lyle Talbot as Prescott Townsend

"Blacks Without Soul" (directed by Landis):

- David Alan Grier as Don "No Soul" Simmons
- B.B. King as Himself
- William Bryant as Male Republican
- Roxie Roker as Female Republican
- Le Tari as Pimp
- Christopher Broughton as Fan Club President

"Two I.D.s" (directed by Peter Horton):

- Rosanna Arquette as Karen
- Steve Guttenberg as Jerry

Bullshit or Not? (directed by Dante):

- Henry Silva as Himself
- Sarah Lilly as Prostitute

"Critics' Corner" (directed by Dante):

- Roger Barkley as Jonathan Herbert
- Al Lohman as Marc Frankel
- Archie Hahn as Harvey Pitnik
- Belinda Balaski as Bernice Pitnik
- Justin Benham as Pitnik Boy
- Erica Gayle as Pitnik Girl

"Silly Pâté" (directed by Weiss):

- Corey Burton as Announcer
- T. K. Carter as Host
- Phil Proctor as Mike
- Ira Newborn as Fred
- Karen Montgomery as Karen

"Roast Your Loved One" (directed by Dante):

- Archie Hahn as Harvey Pitnik
- Belinda Balaski as Bernice Pitnik
- Justin Benham as Pitnik Boy
- Erica Gayle as Pitnik Girl
- Bryan Cranston as Paramedic #1
- Robert Picardo as Rick Raddnitz
- Rip Taylor as Himself
- Slappy White as Himself
- Jackie Vernon as Himself
- Henny Youngman as Himself
- Charlie Callas as Himself
- Steve Allen as Himself

"Video Pirates" (directed by Weiss):

- William Marshall as Pirate Captain
- Tino Insana as Mr. Sylvio
- Donald Gibb as Graceless Pirate
- Frank Collison as Grizzled Pirate
- Bill Taylor as Gruesome Pirate

Son of the Invisible Man (directed by Gottlieb):

- Ed Begley Jr. as Griffin
- Chuck Lafont as Trent
- Pamla Vale as Woman In Pub
- Larry Hankin as Man In Pub
- Garry Goodrow as Checker Player
- Roger La Page as London Bobby

"French Ventriloquist's Dummy" (directed by Dante):

- Dick Miller as Danny Clayton
- Phil Bruns as Danny's Manager
- Martin Goslins as The French Ventriloquist

"Art Sale" (directed by Gottlieb):

- John Ingle as Felix Van Dam

First Lady of the Evening (directed by Weiss):

- Angel Tompkins as Mrs. Chandler
- Terry McGovern as Salesman
- Michael Hanks as Announcer

"Titan Man" (directed by Weiss):

- Matt Adler as George
- Kelly Preston as Violet
- Ralph Bellamy as Mr. Gower
- Howard Hesseman as Rupert King
- Steve Cropper as Customer
- Chris Wolf as Mascot Bip

"Video Date" (directed by Landis):

- Marc McClure as Ray
- Russ Meyer as Video Salesman
- Corrine Wahl as Sherrie
- Andrew Dice Clay as Frankie
- Willard E. Pugh as Speaking Cop

Reckless Youth (directed by Dante):

- Carrie Fisher as Mary Brown
- Paul Bartel as Doctor
- Herb Vigran as Agent
- Tracy Hutchinson as Floozie
- Mike Mazurki as "Dutch"
- Frank Beddor as Ken

"The Unknown Soldier" (directed by Horton)

- Robert Loggia as General McCormick
- Bernie Casey as Major General Hadley
- Ronny Cox as General Balentine
- Wallace Langham as Private Anson W. Pucket

"Peter Pan Theatre" (directed by Gottlieb)

- Jenny Agutter as Cleopatra
- Raye Birk as Vanya Voynitsky
- Mark Bringelson as Theater Customer #1
- Victoria Ann Lewis as Theater Customer #2
- Vivian Bonnell as Theater Customer #3
- Kellye Nakahara as Theater Customer #4

== Production ==
Amazon Women on the Moon was filmed in 1985 with plans for an August 1986 release, but as a result of the ongoing legal fallout from director John Landis' involvement in the Twilight Zone accident, Universal repeatedly pushed the release date and issued a gag order on publicity for the film while the trial was ongoing.

== Reception ==
The majority of critics agreed that the quality was inconsistent throughout the film. Variety called it "irreverent, vulgar, and silly... [with] some hilarious moments and some real groaners, too." Roger Ebert in the Chicago Sun-Times felt that the exercise was somewhat unnecessary: "Satirists are in trouble when their subjects are funnier than they are." Janet Maslin of The New York Times, in a largely positive review, described the film as "an anarchic, often hilarious adventure in dial-spinning, a collection of brief skits and wacko parodies that are sometimes quite clever, though they're just as often happily sophomoric, too."

In a retrospective article for Entertainment Weekly, Chris Nashawaty called the film "the beginning of the end of Landis' career". He cited the episodes featuring Monique Gabrielle, Archie Hahn, Ed Begley Jr. and David Alan Grier as "inspired", but criticized others for their failure: "You'll never see Michelle Pfeiffer look as trapped as she does in her skit with Thirtysomething's Peter Horton, or Joe Pantoliano and Arsenio Hall as unfunny as they are in their skits."

Amazon Women on the Moon has a rating of 65% on Rotten Tomatoes, based on 20 reviews, with an average rating of 5.7/10. On Metacritic it has a 42% score based on reviews from 11 critics.

== See also ==
- Disco Beaver from Outer Space (1978)
- UHF (1989)
