= The Ratings Game =

- Genre: Comedy; Romance
- Written by: Michael Barrie; Jim Mulholland
- Directed by: Danny DeVito
- Starring: Danny DeVito; Rhea Perlman; Gerrit Graham
- Theme music composer: David Spear
- Country of origin: United States
- Original language: English

Production
- Producer: David Jablin
- Production locations: Laird International Studio - 9336 W. Washington Blvd., Culver City, California; Los Angeles
- Cinematography: Tim Suhrstedt
- Editors: Dale Beldin; Marshall Harvey
- Running time: 102 minutes
- Production companies: Imagination Productions; New Street; Newstreet Productions; Viacom Productions

Original release
- Network: Showtime
- Release: December 15, 1984

The Ratings Game, also known as The Mogul, is a 1984 comedy television film directed by Danny DeVito and produced by David Jablin. The Showtime comedy stars DeVito and Rhea Perlman, and features Huntz Hall, Michael Richards, George Wendt and Jerry Seinfeld.

== Plot ==
Vic DeSalvo and his brother Goody are successful New Jersey trucking magnates but Vic has a desire to make it big as a Hollywood producer. He hawks his scripts and ideas from one network executive to another, but he is turned down at each attempt.

Finally, Vic meets Parker Braithwaite, an executive at a second-rate company who has just been fired for promoting a show that attracted zero viewers. To avenge himself, he accepts Vic's script and arranges for a pilot episode of Sittin' Pretty to be filmed. The resultant episode is abysmally awful, both in acting and story but Vic is only inspired to greater heights. The director and star actor walk out and Vic decides to act as well as write and direct.

Vic throws a huge party to make himself known to "le tout Hollywood" but no one comes except Francine Kester, a statistician at a ratings agency. They fall in love. When Francine is passed over for a promotion by her philandering and incompetent boss Wes Vandergelder, she reveals to Vic how the ratings system can be bypassed and results fixed by setting up confederates in Nielsen-ratings households to skew the results. They conspire to run a scam that will make Vic's program the most-watched on television.

The scam works and Vic is voted the best new actor at a grand awards ceremony, showing that many viewers (in addition to the confederates) watched his shows. But the agency has now discovered the scam and as soon as Vic has accepted his award, he is arrested by the police. Francine and Vic are married in jail.

== Cast ==
- Danny DeVito as Vic DeSalvo
- Rhea Perlman as Francine Kester
- Gerrit Graham as Parker Braithwaite
- Kevin McCarthy as Wes Vandergelder
- Huntz Hall as Benny Bentson
- Barry Corbin as The Colonel
- Frank Sivero as Bruno
- Louis Giambalvo as "Goody" DeSalvo
- Basil Hoffman as Frank Friedlander
- Michael Richards as Sal
- Joe Santos as Tony
- Vincent Schiavelli as Skip Imperiali
- George Wendt as Carl Sweeney
- Bernadette Birkett as Mrs. Sweeney
- Jason Hervey as Todd Sweeney
- Steve Allen as Himself
- Jayne Meadows as Herself
- Allyce Beasley as Paisan Receptionist
- Robert Costanzo as Nunzio
- Selma Diamond as Mrs. Kester (voice)
- Kenneth Kimmins as Network Spokesman
- Ron Rifkin as TV Director
- Jerry Seinfeld as Network Rep
- J. Alan Thomas as Cop at Awards Ceremony

== Production ==
The Ratings Game was the first original movie financed by Showtime. The feature also marks Danny DeVito's film directing debut. Writers Michael Barrie and Jim Mulholland won a Writers Guild of America Award for Best Original TV Comedy Movie at the 39th Writers Guild of America Awards and the film won an International TV Movie Festival Award for Best Comedy.

Jerry Seinfeld makes an early appearance in the cast of the film in a one-line part. His future Seinfeld co-star Michael Richards also appears in a slightly larger role; the two share no scenes together.

== Home media ==
The Ratings Game was issued on VHS and Laserdisc by Paramount Home Video.

On July 19, 2016, Olive Films, a boutique distributor of classic and independent films, released The Ratings Game on DVD and Blu-Ray. It is a premium packaged Special Edition that has been restored in full HD from the one print in existence. The discs also include as extras the four short films directed by Danny DeVito prior to making his feature directing debut with The Ratings Game. Other special features include a behind-the-scenes featurette, the original trailer and some deleted scenes. It also includes a 28-page collectors booklet with detailed liner notes and art from the film.

A poor-quality bootleg version of this film has been widely distributed as The Mogul.
