= Robert Cicchini =

American actor

- Born: Michigan
- Education: New York University (MFA)
- Occupation: Actor
- Years active: 1989-present

Robert Cicchini is an American film and television actor and director.

Among Cicchini's film appearances are his roles as Lou Pennino, Vincent Corleone's bodyguard, in The Godfather Part III (1990), Bill Guidone in Light Sleeper (1992), Jimmy Ozio in Primary Colors (1998), and Mitch Casper in The Watcher (2000).

On television he has played recurring roles on Maybe This Time (as Nick Sr.), Providence (as Alex Mendoza), 24 (as Howard Bern) and Six Feet Under (as Todd). Other television appearances include episodes of Law & Order, ER, Chicago Hope, The Sopranos, NYPD Blue, Gilmore Girls, CSI: Crime Scene Investigation, Everybody Hates Chris, and Cold Case.

== Filmography ==
Year	Title	Role	Director	Notes
1989	Alien Space Avenger	Raoul	Richard W. Haines	
1990	The Godfather Part III	Lou Pennino	Francis Ford Coppola	
1991	Age Isn't Everything	Bruno	Douglas Katz	
1991	Mission of the Shark	D'Angelo	Robert Iscove	TV movie
1992	Light Sleeper	Bill Guidone	Paul Schrader	
1992	Devlin	Rizzo	Rick Rosenthal	TV movie
1992	Jonathan: The Boy Nobody Wanted	Neil Vogler	George Kaczender	TV movie
1993	The Pickle	Electronics Store Clerk	Paul Mazursky	
1993	Law & Order	Gerald Austin	Arthur W. Forney	TV series (1 episode)
1994	NYPD Blue	Nicky Costantino	Michael M. Robin	TV series (1 episode)
1994	Robin's Hoods	Paul Quill	Martin Pasetta	TV series (1 episode)
1994	The Commish	Eddie DiMaestri	James Whitmore Jr.	TV series (2 episodes)
1995	ER	Channel 5 Reporter	Christopher Chulack	TV series (1 episode)
1995	Marker		George Mendeluk	TV series (1 episode)
1996	Nowhere Man	Michael Kramer	Reza Badiyi	TV series (1 episode)
1996	Maybe This Time	Nick Sr.	David Trainer	TV series (4 episodes)
1997	Dog Watch	Mink	John Langley	
1997	The Don's Analyst	Donnie Leoni	David Jablin	TV movie
1997	The Sentinel	Gordon Abbott	William Gereghty	TV series (1 episode)
1997	Pacific Blue		Terence H. Winkless	TV series (1 episode)
1998	Primary Colors	Jimmy Ozio	Mike Nichols	
1998	A Civil Action	PI Lawyers	Steven Zaillian	
1998	Chicago Hope	Tony Mangelli	Rob Corn	TV series (1 episode)
1998	Beyond Belief: Fact or Fiction	Sonny Rhodes	Tony Randel	TV series (1 episode)
1999	Cool Crime	John	Jérôme Cohen-Olivar	
1999	The Deep End of the Ocean	Uncle Joey	Ulu Grosbard	
1999	Time of Your Life	Mitchell	Michael Engler & Ellen S. Pressman	TV series (2 episodes)
1999-2000	Providence	Alex Mendoza	Michael Fresco & John Patterson	TV series (5 episodes)
2000	The Watcher	Mitch Casper	Joe Charbanic	
2000	A Family in Crisis: The Elian Gonzales Story	Sam Ciancio	Christopher Leitch	TV movie
2000	The Sopranos	Dr. D'Alessio	Allen Coulter	TV series (1 episode)
2000	Touched by an Angel	Coach Duncan	Peter H. Hunt	TV series (1 episode)
2002	Path to War	Joseph A. Califano Jr.	John Frankenheimer	TV movie
2002	NYPD Blue	Tim Hale	Mark Piznarski	TV series (1 episode)
2002	The Practice	Rodney Edsel	Jeannot Szwarc	TV series (1 episode)
2002	The Guardian	Jonathan Goldsmith	Andy Wolk	TV series (1 episode)
2002	Presidio Med		Charles Haid	TV series (1 episode)
2002	Strong Medicine		Jan Eliasberg	TV series (1 episode)
2002	Without a Trace		Paul Holahan	TV series (1 episode)
2003	Love and Loathing at the Ass Lamp Lounge	Marc Stanton	Mike Andrews	
2003	Gilmore Girls	Russell Bynes	Chris Long	TV series (1 episode)
2003	Mister Sterling		Rick Wallace	TV series (1 episode)
2003	Crossing Jordan	Diner Owner	Michael Gershman	TV series (1 episode)
2003	American Dreams	Mr. Bojarski	Craig Zisk	TV series (1 episode)
2003-2005	Six Feet Under	Todd	Michael Cuesta, Kathy Bates, ...	TV series (5 episodes)
2004	Fallacy		Jeff Jensen	
2004	The Sure Hand of God	Joe	Michael Kolko	
2004	Cold Case	Paul Chaney	James Whitmore Jr.	TV series (1 episode)
2004	Touching Evil	Father Bob Di Fabian	Rob Bailey	TV series (1 episode)
2004	NCIS	Agent Daniel Snyder	Peter Ellis & Thomas J. Wright	TV series (2 episodes)
2005	Come as You Are	Dr. Kramer	Chuck Rose	
2005	War of the Worlds	Guy in Suit	Steven Spielberg	
2005	Mrs. Harris	Det. Siciliano	Phyllis Nagy	TV movie
2005	Just Legal		Dwight H. Little	TV series (1 episode)
2005	Blind Justice	Lloyd Crider	Gary Fleder	TV series (1 episode)
2005	Everybody Hates Chris	Coach Brady	Lev L. Spiro	TV series (1 episode)
2005	CSI: Crime Scene Investigation	Mr. Daluca	Terrence O'Hara	TV series (1 episode)
2005	24	Howard Bern	Jon Cassar, Bryan Spicer, ...	TV series (4 episodes)
2006	Dreamgirls	Nicky Cassaro	Bill Condon	
2006	Desperate Housewives	Scott Tollman	David Grossman	TV series (1 episode)
2007	Shark	Ramon Campos	Paul McCrane	TV series (1 episode)
2007	State of Mind	John	Michael M. Robin	TV series (1 episode)
2008	Em	Male Psychiatrist	Tony Barbieri	
2008	CSI: NY	Felix Hall	Marshall Adams	TV series (1 episode)
2008	Las Vegas		Bill L. Norton	TV series (1 episode)
2008	The Closer	Parole officer	Arvin Brown	TV series (1 episode)
2009	B-Girl	Dr. Volchek	Emily Dell	
2009	Play Dead	TV Announcer	Jason Wiles	
2010	All My Children	Artie	Casey Childs	TV series (1 episode)
2010	Law & Order: Los Angeles	Restaurant Owner	Roger Young	TV series (1 episode)
2011	The Event	Dr. Narducci	Milan Cheylov	TV series (1 episode)
2011	The Mentalist	Nick Monaco	Eric Laneuville	TV series (1 episode)
2012	Waterwalk	Steven Faulkner	Robert Cicchini & James Sparling	
2012	California Solo	Domenico	Marshall Lewy	
2012	Bones	Ezra Krane	Ian Toynton	TV series (1 episode)
2013	#1 Serial Killer	Detective Phillips	Stanley Yung	
2013	Twisted	Ray Bickner	Joe Lazarov	TV series (1 episode)
2013	Livin' It Up	Skydive Louie	Chase Yi	TV series (1 episode)
2014	Pilot Error	Philippe	Joe Anderson	
2014	Castle	Mr. Turino	Paul Holahan	TV series (1 episode)
2014	Shameless	ER Doctor	Christopher Chulack	TV series (1 episode)
2015	Chasing Eagle Rock	Joe Paul	Erick Avari	
2015	Wicked City		Allison Liddi-Brown	TV series (1 episode)
2015	Rizzoli & Isles	Carlo	Stephen Clancy	TV series (1 episode)
2016	Laguna Sleep	Uncle Bobby	Jordan Jacinto	Short
2016	Murder in the First	Chief Charles Shannon	Jesse Bochco, Eriq La Salle, ...	TV series (3 episodes)
2018	S.W.A.T.	Mark	Billy Gierhart	TV series (1 episode)
2019	SEAL Team	Dr. Bernstein	Ruben Garcia	TV series (1 episode)
2019	Animal Kingdom		Solvan Naim	TV series (1 episode)
2019	The Morning Show	Robert	David Frankel	TV series (1 episode)
2020	Fate of a Mathor	Father Anthony	Admire Simbarasi	Post-Production
2020	Unto Others		Bill Dumas	Post-Production
2023	Heart of a Lion	Angelo Dundee	George Tillman Jr.	
