= Oscar (1991 film) =

1991 film by John Landis

- Theatrical release poster
- Directed by: John Landis
- Written by: Michael Barrie; Jim Mulholland
- Based on: Oscar by Claude Magnier
- Produced by: Leslie Belzberg
- Starring: Sylvester Stallone
- Cinematography: Mac Ahlberg
- Edited by: Dale Beldin
- Music by: Elmer Bernstein
- Production companies: Touchstone Pictures; Silver Screen Partners IV
- Distributed by: Buena Vista Pictures Distribution
- Release date: April 26, 1991
- Running time: 109 minutes
- Country: United States
- Language: English
- Budget: $35 million
- Box office: $23.6 million (Domestic)

Oscar is a 1991 American comedy film directed by John Landis. Based on the Claude Magnier stage play, it is a remake of the 1967 French film of the same name, but set in Depression-era New York City. Oscar stars Sylvester Stallone, in a rare comedic role, as Angelo "Snaps" Provolone, a mob boss who promises his dying father Eduardo that he will leave the world of crime and become an honest businessman. Alongside Stallone, the film's cast includes Marisa Tomei, Ornella Muti, Tim Curry, Don Ameche and Chazz Palminteri. Its score was composed by Elmer Bernstein. Designed as a comedic vehicle for Stallone (an unusual role for him), the film was considered a flop, failing to earn back its $35 million budget. Oscar was released in the United States on April 26, 1991, and received negative reviews from critics.

According to Landis, Oscar was stylistically influenced by older Hollywood comedies, particularly those belonging to the "screwball" genre, which were popular during the period in which the film takes place.

== Plot ==
In 1931, gangster Angelo "Snaps" Provolone promises his dying father Eduardo that he will give up a life of crime and instead "go straight", complete with turning his trusted gang into his house assistants. A month later, Snaps awakens at his mansion and begins his important morning. He has a meeting with several prominent bankers, as he hopes to donate a large sum of cash and join the bank's board of trustees, thereby having an honest job and keeping his word to his father. Anthony Rossano, Snaps' young, good-natured accountant, arrives at the mansion, asking for a 250% raise. He tells Snaps that he is in love with his daughter and plans to propose to her with a $50,000 gift, invested in precious stones, that he had taken from cooking the books. He tried to tell him a few years ago about the error, but Snaps was in Chicago on St Valentine Day. Snaps is furious and does not want his daughter to marry Anthony.

Lisa, the only child of Snaps and his wife, Sofia, is a spoiled young damsel whose dreams of seeing the world hit a roadblock because of her overprotective father. Wishing to move out of the house, she lies to her parents at the suggestion of the maid, Nora, and claims to be pregnant. Snaps, believing the father to be Anthony, is shocked when Lisa says the father is Oscar, the former chauffeur, who is now serving overseas in the military.

Theresa, the woman with whom Anthony fell in love, visits Snaps and reveals she lied to Anthony about being Snaps' daughter to impress him. With Sofia demanding that Snaps find a man to serve as a father to Lisa's baby, Snaps tricks Anthony into agreeing to marry Lisa and give her the jewels before he can learn the truth from Theresa. When Theresa confesses to Anthony, she assumes he cares more about the given-up jewels than about her, and breaks up with him. Not wanting to marry Lisa, Anthony tells her that Dr. Thornton Poole, Snaps' dialectician, is in love with her. Poole later turns out to be a suitable match for Lisa, as his frequent world travels appeal to her adventurous nature.

Meanwhile, local police lieutenant Toomey is keeping an eye on the mansion, believing Snaps is going to meet with Chicago mobsters. Snaps' mob rival Vendetti believes the same and watches the mansion with his gang. Due to various people coming and going around the mansion in a short time, both Toomey and Vendetti become convinced of their suspicions. Things get even more complicated when the black bag containing the jewels is frequently mistaken for Nora's identical bag full of underwear. Believing Snaps uses the bags to smuggle money, Toomey and Vendetti each plan a hit on Snaps in the early afternoon.

Anthony recovers the jewels and his statement of marriage to Lisa by paying Snaps $50,000 in cash, which he also has through further creative accounting. Theresa comes back to seek out Anthony, while Anthony gives the jewels back to Snaps after realizing that the money will not make him as happy as he was with Theresa. Touched, Snaps helps Anthony and Theresa reconcile. Poole and Lisa also announce that they are getting married after actually falling in love with each other.

A new maid, Roxanne, arrives at the mansion due to Nora quitting to marry Bruce Underwood, one of Snaps' business associates. It turns out that Roxanne is an old flame of Snaps', and as they talk, she reveals she was pregnant with Snaps' child, but never had the chance to contact him because her father forbade it. Theresa is revealed to be Roxanne's grown-up child, making her Snaps' daughter after all. The impromptu celebration is cut short by the bankers' arrival. During the meeting, Snaps senses that the bankers are giving him a raw deal: they will not give him any actual influence over the bank's operations, despite the money he is willing to invest. The meeting is interrupted by police officers and Toomey, who is embarrassed to find no money or gangsters present on site. He leaves the mansion just in time for Vendetti's car full of armed men to crash right outside. Toomey victoriously arrests the men.

Despite Eduardo's wishes, Snaps realizes that he would rather deal with gangsters and gunmen than "respectable" bankers, and decides to abandon his short-lived honest ways and return to a life of crime. Later, a double wedding is held for both his daughters. Oscar himself finally appears and objects to Lisa's marriage, but he is carried off by Snaps' men and the weddings end happily.

== Cast ==
- Sylvester Stallone as Angelo "Snaps" Provolone
- Ornella Muti as Sofia Provolone
- Don Ameche as Father Pablo Clemente
- Peter Riegert as Aldo
- Tim Curry as Dr. Thornton Poole
- Vincent Spano as Anthony Rossano
- Marisa Tomei as Lisa Provolone
- Elizabeth Barondes as Theresa
- Eddie Bracken as Five Spot Charlie
- Linda Gray as Roxanne
- Chazz Palminteri as Connie
- Kurtwood Smith as Lieutenant Toomey
- William Atherton as Overton
- Art LaFleur as Officer Quinn
- Robert Lesser as Officer Keough
- Yvonne De Carlo as Aunt Rosa Provolone
- Martin Ferrero as Luigi Finucci
- Harry Shearer as Guido Finucci
- Richard Romanus as Vendetti
- Arleen Sorkin as Manicurist
- Joycelyn O'Brien as Nora
- Jim Mulholland as Oscar
- Joey Travolta as Ace
- Kirk Douglas as Eduardo Provolone

== Production ==
According to director John Landis, the film was influenced by comedies released around the era in which the film is set, with humor and dialogue delivered in a manner reminiscent of old Hollywood comedies, particularly the "screwball" genre.

Oscar is a farce set in 1931, sort of Damon Runyon meets Feydeau. I shot the picture in a deliberately stylized manner, attempting a thirties Hollywood comedy look and feel (Peter Riegert, at one point, actually says, "Why I oughta...")

Landis' first choice for the lead role Angelo "Snaps" Provolone was Al Pacino, who was to be paid $2 million for the role but was then offered $3 million to appear in Dick Tracy. "He was very upfront about it; he said he was going to go for the money," said Landis. "I think Oscar would've been a much better movie with Al, but there you go." Sylvester Stallone later said he should have played Snaps, his character in the film, "incredibly cynical like in the original French version".

Before production ended, Landis invited Jonathan Lynn (then casting for My Cousin Vinny) onto the set. When Lynn and others saw Marisa Tomei in a scene, they were convinced they had their actress for their film; the following year after the release of Oscar, Tomei won the Academy Award for Best Supporting Actress at the 65th Academy Awards for her performance in My Cousin Vinny.

== Music ==
The film score was composed by Elmer Bernstein and is based around Gioachino Rossini's Barber of Seville. In the Varèse Sarabande edition of the film soundtrack, Landis penned liner notes about the development of the score:

As I shot the film I envisioned a particular kind of score and knew that Elmer would be the one to write it...By using a "comic opera" approach, I was actually contradicting the musical theory that Elmer and I had inaugurated 14 years ago with the "serious" score for Animal House.

The opening track is "Largo Al Factotum" from The Barber of Seville, performed by Earle Patriarco. The track "Cops and Real Crooks" includes "Finucci Piano Boogie," composed and performed by Ralph Grierson. The soundtrack also contained four pre-existing songs which appeared in the film: "Sweet Georgia Brown" (performed by Bing Crosby); "Rockin' in Rhythm" (performed by Duke Ellington & His Orchestra); "Tea for Two" (performed by Fred Waring & His Pennsylvanians); and "Plain Dirt" (performed by McKinney's Cotton Pickers).

1. "Largo Al Factotum" (performed by Earle Patriarco) (4:42)
2. "Grifting" (5:43)
3. "Lisa Dreams" (3:46)
4. "Tea and Romance" (4:29)
5. "Revelations" (5:27)
6. "Cops and Real Crooks" (composed and performed by Ralph Grierson) (5:45)
7. "Sweet Georgia Brown" – Bing Crosby (2:54)
8. "Rockin' in Rhythm" – Duke Ellington and His Orchestra (3:21)
9. "Tea for Two" – Fred Waring and His Pennsylvanians (3:21)
10. "Plain Dirt" – McKinney's Cotton Pickers (2:38)

== Release ==
=== Theatrical ===
The film was released theatrically in the United States on April 26, 1991 and had nine international releases from June to September 1991.

=== Home media ===
Oscar was released on VHS on September 11, 1991, followed by a LaserDisc edition on November 11. The film was released on DVD on May 6, 2003, and later received a Blu-ray release by Kino Lorber on September 5, 2018.

== Reception ==
=== Critical response ===
On review aggregator website Rotten Tomatoes, the film holds an 11% approval rating based on 18 reviews, with an average rating of 3.70/10. On Metacritic, the film has a weighted average score of 47 out of 100 based on 20 critics, indicating "mixed or average reviews".

=== Contemporary reviews ===
Oscar received mixed reviews from critics upon release. Dave Kehr of the Chicago Tribune wrote, "Landis does his best to give the material a cartoonlike rhythm and stylized sense of movement ... but the labored, repetitive screenplay, by Michael Barrie and Jim Mulholland, defeats him." He continued, "For a film meant to define a lighter and fresher image for Stallone, Oscar doesn't quite get the job done." Owen Gleiberman of Entertainment Weekly gave the film a grade of "D+", writing: "Director John Landis executes the mechanics of farce without a trace of the speed or effervescence this material demands. Every chuckle feels engineered."

Conversely, Tribune reviewer Gene Siskel gave the film a score of three out of four stars. While he described the first reel as "disastrous", he added that the film included "truly funny work by enormously talented supporting players." Roger Ebert was in full agreement with Siskel on At the Movies and they gave the film "two thumbs up". Variety stated the film was an "intermittently amusing throwback to gangster comedies of the 1930s. While dominated by star Sylvester Stallone and heavy doses of production and costume design, the pic is most distinguished by sterling turns by superb character actors." Kathleen Maher of The Austin Chronicle gave the film three out of five stars, commending Stallone's performance: "I'm not used to having much good to say about the guy, but Stallone has evidenced a nascent sense of humor before, and here he allows it to blossom."

Audiences polled by CinemaScore gave the film an average grade of "B" on an A+ to F scale.

Oscar was nominated for three Golden Raspberry Awards at the 12th Golden Raspberry Awards in 1992: Worst Actor (Sylvester Stallone), Worst Director (John Landis), and Worst Supporting Actress (Marisa Tomei).

=== Retrospective assessments ===
In 2006, Stallone was asked about what films he wished he had not done and mentioned Oscar right after Stop! Or My Mom Will Shoot (1992). Speaking with ComicBook.com in support of his show Tulsa King, Stallone says he still loves Oscar in spite of its lukewarm reception: "I guess it was too much of a shocking transition from Rambo to that, but I love doing that kind of drama."

In 2017, director John Landis said:

I made a movie once, Oscar with Sylvester Stallone, and everybody who saw the movie and liked it, would never go out and see Stallone. We did a preview of the movie and someone wrote on the card, 'Why didn't he take his shirt off and kill anybody?' [Laughs.] But we had an extraordinary cast, we had Kirk Douglas, Don Ameche, and a girl who had never been in a movie before: Marisa Tomei. She was so extremely great from the first day! And what had she done before? Practically nothing! Now, that's talent. She was so unbelievably good.

In 2020, Lee Pfeiffer of Cinema Retro wrote that "Oscar was a box-office flop and critics attacked it across the board. However, it has aged very well, and I found it to be a delight throughout. Give it a chance, will ya?"
