= Allegiance (Star Trek: The Next Generation) =

- Star Trek: The Next Generation episode
- Episode no.: Season 3 Episode 18
- Directed by: Winrich Kolbe
- Written by: Richard Manning; Hans Beimler
- Cinematography by: Marvin Rush
- Production code: 166
- Original air date: March 26, 1990

Guest appearances
- Stephen Markle as Kova Tholl; Reiner Schöne as Esoqq; Joycelyn O'Brien as Mitena Haro; Jerry Rector as Alien; Jeff Rector as Alien

Episode chronology
← Previous "Sins of the Father"	Next → "Captain's Holiday"
- Star Trek: The Next Generation season 3

"Allegiance" is the 18th episode of the third season of the American syndicated science fiction television series Star Trek: The Next Generation, and the 66th episode of the series overall. It was originally released on March 26, 1990, in broadcast syndication.

Set in the 24th century, the series follows the adventures of the Starfleet crew of the Federation starship Enterprise-D. In this episode, Captain Picard finds himself abducted from the Enterprise and held in a chamber with other prisoners, while a doppelgänger replacing him behaves strangely and gives increasingly disturbing orders.

== Plot ==
Captain Picard, while sleeping in his quarters on the Enterprise after the successful completion of a mission, is abducted by an unknown device. He finds himself in a cell with two other prisoners: Starfleet Academy Cadet Haro from Bolarus IX; and philosopher Kova Tholl from Mizar II. They are later joined by the violent Esoqq from Chalnoth. They have meager beds and facilities, and their only source of nutrition is a dispenser of tasteless rubbery disks, which Esoqq is unable to eat. He moves toward Tholl as though to eat him, but Picard is able to dissuade Esoqq temporarily. Picard attempts to learn why the four of them have been abducted but can find no connection. Picard organizes Haro and Esoqq to attempt to break the lock on the only door to the cell. Initially foiled by a stun beam when they tamper with the controls, they manage to override the beam and then defeat the door's security, only to find a blank wall behind it.

Meanwhile, on the Enterprise, a doppelgänger of Picard has taken his place, ordering the ship to delay a scheduled rendezvous with another ship and travel slowly to a nearby pulsar. En route, Picard's double exhibits behavior that the senior crew begins to question, such as his newfound romance for Dr. Crusher, as well as engaging the crew in singing "Heart of Oak", the official march of the Royal Navy, in Ten Forward. Upon reaching the pulsar, Picard's double orders the ship to be moved closer, potentially exposing the crew to lethal radiation, Commander Riker and the rest of the bridge crew refuse to follow his orders, effectively removing him from command due to his perceived unfitness for duty.

After discovering the false door in the cell, the real Picard deduces that Haro is not who she claims to be, as she knows details of a secret Starfleet mission that were not available to Academy cadets. Picard observes that the four different alien captives and the tightly controlled setting are suggestive of some kind of experiment: Tholl, the collaborator who goes along with whoever is in charge; Esoqq, typical for his species, a violent anarchist who rejects any kind of authority; Haro, the cadet, sworn to obey orders without question; and Picard, a leader, accustomed to giving orders. Haro reveals herself to be not a Bolian, but a member of an unidentified alien species. She reverts to her natural form and is joined by a second such alien; the two have been studying the concept of authority and leadership, as their race lacks hierarchical authority structures such as humans and other races have. Because the captives' knowledge of the experiment has now made it impossible to continue collecting data on their natural behavior, the aliens return Picard, Tholl, and Esoqq to their respective original locations.

Aboard the Enterprise, Picard's double is also revealed to be of the same alien species, all members of which are in constant telepathic contact, which the aliens remark is far superior to the vocal communication used by the beings aboard the Enterprise. When Picard criticizes them for engaging in kidnapping and assault, the aliens express ignorance of the morality Picard espouses, and indicate that they will need to study this concept further. However, Picard uses a series of nonverbal cues to direct his crew to trap them within a force field, causing the aliens to panic as they are unable to bear captivity. After a few moments, he releases the field and allows them to go free, but warns them not to abduct others again.

== Awards ==
"Allegiance" was nominated for an Emmy for Outstanding Achievement in Makeup for a Series.

== Reception ==
In 2018, Popular Mechanics highlighted "Allegiance" as one of the best Captain Picard episodes, and as recommended viewing for audiences to prepare for a new television series based on that character, Star Trek: Picard.

In 2017, Syfy rated the Chalnoth featured in this episode, one of the top 11 most bizarre aliens of Star Trek: The Next Generation.

== Releases ==
The episode was released with Star Trek: The Next Generation season three DVD box set, released in the United States on July 2, 2002. This had 26 episodes of Season 3 on seven discs, with a Dolby Digital 5.1 audio track. It was released in high-definition Blu-ray in the United States on April 30, 2013.

== See also ==
- "What are little girls made of?", an episode in Star Trek: The Original Series
- "Whispers", an episode in Star Trek: Deep Space Nine
