= Going in Style =

1979 film by Martin Brest

- Theatrical release poster
- Directed by: Martin Brest
- Screenplay by: Martin Brest
- Story by: Edward Cannon
- Produced by: Tony Bill; Fred T. Gallo
- Starring: George Burns; Art Carney; Lee Strasberg
- Cinematography: Billy Williams
- Edited by: Carroll Timothy O'Meara; Robert Swink
- Music by: Michael Small
- Distributed by: Warner Bros. Pictures
- Release date: December 25, 1979
- Running time: 97 minutes
- Country: United States
- Language: English
- Budget: $5.5 million
- Box office: $30 million

Going in Style is a 1979 American heist comedy-drama film written and directed by Martin Brest and starring George Burns, Art Carney, Lee Strasberg (in his final film role) and Charles Hallahan. It was Brest's first commercial feature film.

The film was a critical and box office success.

== Plot ==
Joe, Al, and Willie are three senior citizens who share a small apartment in Queens, New York City. Their days are spent on a park bench, and Joe is desperate to break the monotony. One day Joe suggests that they go on a "stick-up". They have no experience as criminals, but after some reluctance, the two others agree.

Al surreptitiously borrows three pistols from the gun collection of his nephew Pete, who lives with his wife Kathy and two children Colleen and Kevin a few miles away. The trio, disguised with novelty glasses, pulls off the heist, netting $35,000. The excitement is too much for Willie, who soon suffers a fatal heart attack. Joe and Al give $25,000 to Pete and his family, claiming it is the proceeds from Willie's life insurance policy. They decide to splurge the remaining $10,000 on a trip to Las Vegas. Al and Joe win over $70,000 playing craps, but the trip, which they make right after Willie's funeral, exhausts Al and he dies in his sleep.

Joe informs Pete that his uncle has died, then tells him about the bank heist and the Las Vegas adventure. He gives Pete the remaining bank loot and the Vegas winnings and tells him to store the cash in his safe deposit box and never tell anyone about it. The next day, on his way to Al's funeral, Joe is arrested. He confesses to the robbery but refuses to say what happened to the money.

Pete visits Joe in prison and suggests giving back at least the stolen portion of the money in the hope of a lighter sentence. Joe explains that he is an old man with no family and, now, no friends, and is resigned to his fate. He tells Pete to enjoy his "inheritance", but while heading back to his cell, cheekily suggests that he plans to break out.

== Cast ==
- George Burns as Joe Harris
- Art Carney as Al
- Lee Strasberg as Willie
- Charles Hallahan as Pete
- Pamela Payton-Wright as Kathy
- Mark Margolis as Prison Guard
- Siobhan Keegan as Colleen
- Brian Neville as Kevin

== Reception ==
Critic Gene Siskel of the Chicago Tribune gave the film three and a half stars, remarking that it "treats old age with a lot of bitterness. And my suspicion is that this picture will be a healthy catharsis for anyone who is old or is thinking about becoming old." Siskel added that "what this remarkable movie is after is duplicating the texture of being old in America. And, as we spend the final days with these three characters, we discover that what growing old is about for so many people is being alone. In one heart-tugging scene after another, we see the maturity it takes to make peace with yourself as you grow old. We see the strength it takes to be willing to sit quietly." Siskel offered particular praise for Burns' performance, stating that "Fans of George Burns . . . will be startled by his performance in this film. Burns, who has always seemed so cheerful on film, lets out some of his rage at growing old. He does this in a controlled, quiet way that reveals he is one remarkable actor."

Vincent Canby of The New York Times said that the film "means to be both moving and comic" but "never elicits any emotional response more profound than curiosity."

On Rotten Tomatoes, the film has an 82% approval rating based on 11 reviews.

== Novelization ==
Robert Grossbach wrote the novelization.

== Remake ==
In 2015, Warner Bros. Pictures and New Line Cinema began production on a remake, also titled Going in Style, directed by Zach Braff, written by Theodore Melfi and starring Morgan Freeman, Michael Caine and Alan Arkin. The remake was released on April 7, 2017 to mixed reception.

== See also ==
Other crime caper films involving older perpetrators include:

- Stand Up Guys
- Tough Guys
- The Old Man & the Gun
