= Hot Dogs for Gauguin =

- Directed by: Martin Brest
- Written by: Martin Brest
- Starring: Danny DeVito; Rhea Perlman; Martin Brest
- Cinematography: Jacques Haitkin
- Edited by: Martin Brest
- Release date: 1972
- Running time: 22 minutes
- Country: United States
- Language: English
- Budget: $800.00

Hot Dogs for Gauguin (1972) is a short student film written and directed by Martin Brest, then an undergraduate at New York University, featuring a then unknown Danny DeVito and Rhea Perlman in her acting debut.

== Plot ==
DeVito plays a starving photographer determined to capture fame and fortune. Inspired by the Hindenburg zeppelin disaster of 1937, he conceives a plot to blow up the Statue of Liberty and capture the photograph.

== Reception and legacy ==
In 2009, it was one of 25 films selected for the National Film Registry by the Library of Congress to "be preserved as cultural, artistic and/or historical treasures." In 2024 it entered the permanent collection of the Museum of Modern Art.
