= The Don's Analyst =

1997 American film by David Jablin

- VHS cover
- Genre: Crime comedy
- Written by: David Hurwitz
- Directed by: David Jablin
- Starring: Kevin Pollak; Robert Loggia; Joseph Bologna; Angie Dickinson; Sherilyn Fenn; Rick Aiello; Robert Cicchini; Joe Flaherty; Lucy Webb
- Music by: Mader
- Country of origin: United States
- Original language: English

Production
- Executive producer: David Jablin
- Producer: Larry Rapaport
- Cinematography: Levie Isaacks
- Editor: Chris Ellis
- Running time: 103 minutes
- Production company: Imagination Productions

Original release
- Network: Showtime
- Release: September 6, 1997

National Lampoon's The Don's Analyst is an American crime comedy television film directed by David Jablin, written by David Hurwitz, and starring Kevin Pollak, Robert Loggia, and Sherilyn Fenn. It premiered on Showtime on September 6, 1997. It predated the very similarly-plotted 1999 film Analyze This.

== Plot ==
Don Vito Leoni, the Godfather, is clinically depressed. The world has changed and he hasn't. He'd like to retire, but if he left the "family business" to his two idiot sons, they'd be dead in a minute. So he decides to go legit, which convinces everyone that he must be completely off the deep end. To preserve their cushy lives, his dysfunctional family conspires to get him some psychotherapy. So his boys kidnap a "paisan" shrink, and order him to "fix" their father.

== Cast ==
- Robert Loggia as Don Vito Leoni
- Rick Aiello as Frankie Leoni
- Robert Cicchini as Donnie Leoni
- Howard Jerome as Tomaso
- Louis Di Bianco as Salvatore
- David Calderisi as Anthony
- Lou Pitoscia as Tommy The Rope
- George Santino as Paul Tondini
- Angie Dickinson as Victoria Leoni
- Kevin Pollak as Dr. Julian Riceputo
- Lucy Webb as Dr. Susan Riceputo
- Joe Flaherty as Dr. Lowell Royce
- David Bolt as Dr. Jack Schweigert
- Sherilyn Fenn as Isabella Leoni
- Paulo Costanzo as Young Vito Leoni
- Daniel DeSanto as Young Vincent DeMarco
- Joseph Bologna as Vincent DeMarco
- Peter Blais as Dr. Byron Frohlich
- Philip Akin as Dr. Lusting
