= Heide Perlman =

Television producer, television writer (b. 1951)

- Born: Heide Paula Perlman; September 22, 1951 (age 74); Brooklyn, New York, U.S.
- Occupations: Television producer, television writer
- Years active: 1982–present
- Father: Phil Perlman
- Relatives: Rhea Perlman (sister); Lucy DeVito (niece); Randall Miller (cousin)

Heide Paula Perlman (born September 22, 1951) is an American television writer and producer. She began work as a writer on the sitcom Cheers from 1982 through 1986; since then she has worked as a writer, producer and/or story editor worked on Frasier and The Tracey Ullman Show (which she co-created), Frasier, The George Carlin Show, Stacked, The Bill Engvall Show and others. She has won two Primetime Emmy Awards, and been nominated for eight others.

She is the younger sister of Cheers actress Rhea Perlman.
