= Roger Barkley =

American radio personality

Roger Barkley (September 11, 1936, Odebolt, Iowa, USA – December 21, 1997, Duarte, California) was an American radio personality, based in Los Angeles, California, best remembered for his work with Al Lohman as part of The Lohman and Barkley Show on KFI.

== Early career ==
Barkley left his Iowa hometown at age 17 to pursue a career in broadcasting. He began as a page boy at WCCO in Minneapolis, Minnesota, while attending the American Institute of the Air in Minnesota. After that, he held positions as announcer and program director at stations in Mankato, Minnesota (KYSM); Fairmont, Minnesota (KSUM) and Salt Lake City, Utah (KALL). After serving in the U.S. Army, he went on to work in Dallas, Texas (KBOX) and Denver, Colorado (KIMN).

== Los Angeles career ==
Barkley moved to Los Angeles and worked at KLAC (1961–67), KFWB (1967–68), KFI (1968–86), KJOI (1986–89) and KABC (1990–96).

=== KFI - Lohman and Barkley (1961-1986) ===
Barkley became the program director at Los Angeles station KLAC and hired Al Lohman for the morning show. When station KLAC was sold to Metromedia in 1961, the new owners began a search for a two-man morning team. Barkley was quoted as saying, "We figured we were all going to be fired, so Al and I thought perhaps we should do the morning show as a team; this way, we could buy some time to look for another job." The combo worked well, and he teamed with Lohman for the next twenty-five years. Barkley played the straight man, interviewer, and narrator to Al's different voiced characters. The morning commuter audience tuned in by the thousands as shown by ratings to hear Lohman's quick wit and vast array of character voices play against Barkley's straight man routine. Among Lohman's characters were the obsequious con-man and alleged farm expert “Maynard Farmer,” whose toadying “That there’s the finest (whatever) that I’ve ever seen there, sir” won him numerous undeserved rewards; “Otis Elevator”, a good-natured handyman; "Judge Roy Bean," a hanging judge. The pair also hosted two short-lived, Emmy Award-winning network television shows, made frequent appearances on The Ed Sullivan Show and Hollywood Squares and numerous personal appearances at Los Angeles' famed Cocoanut Grove nightclub. In 1987, they appeared as themselves in the film Amazon Women on the Moon. Their work in both radio and television also earned them a star on the Hollywood Walk of Fame.

Although Lohman and Barkley's morning KFI show was mostly talk and the skits, an occasional tune was played, probably to give the guys a restroom break. In a later Los Angeles Times article regarding his sudden exit from KFI, Barkley was quoted as saying that he warned their program director that their constant playing of the same Eagles songs over and over was very aggravating to him. He said if he heard "Hotel California" one more time, that he might just get up and walk out one day. Also, Springsteen was overplayed. This actual quote appeared in the Los Angeles Times in 1986. Barkley said: "For the past two weeks or so, it was awfully tough to work on taping and doing shows when I couldn't even bear to listen to another (rocker Bruce) Springsteen song. I thought that if I heard "My Hometown" one more time, I was going to lose my mind. And it wasn't just the music; it was the whole stress of the daily grind. So I started looking more closely at what I really wanted to do at this point in my life." He also alluded to Lohman's increasing undisciplined ways, including a growing tendency to not be at the station in time for the start of the show. Obviously, Barkley was simply tiring of the situation.

Barkley suddenly and not inexplicably left the duo in May 1986, and within two weeks he was named the morning radio personality at KJOI. He never again spoke with Lohman.

=== KABC - Ken and Barkley Company ===
In 1990, Roger became co-host of The Ken and Barkley Company on KABC alongside Ken Minyard. Like the Lohman and Barkley show, this show was consistently rated number one in local morning drive. Years later, on the Los Angeles Ken and Barkley Company KABC radio show, when Ken Minyard mentioned Al Lohman, Barkley remarked, "He says that I destroyed his career." Ironically, Barkley eventually went through a bit of the same. After six years, the Ken and Barkley show was dropping in ratings in the very competitive LA morning drive market, and Barkley was dropped too, though Minyard continued on with a new format. He said that Barkley was very upset, but that the station demanded a change.

== Philanthropy and business ==
A tireless philanthropist, Barkley served as master of ceremonies nearly 200 times each year for various causes, donating his proceeds to charity each time. The Roger Barkley Community Foundation continues to donate money to hospitals, youth groups, scholarships and medical research. As an entrepreneur, Barkley and business partner Jim Campbell opened "The Barkley," a chain of upscale restaurants.

== Death ==
The popular broadcaster was diagnosed with cancer in late 1997. Roger Barkley died at age 61 of pancreatic cancer on December 21, 1997, at City of Hope National Medical Center in Duarte, California. At the funeral, Al Lohman spoke with great warmth about his former KFI co-host.

== Discography ==
- Light of My Life Volume One - The Breath of Dr. Duncan & Doc in the Box (LP and Cassette)
- Light of My Life Volume Two - The Arrest of Dr. Duncan & Mouse in the Hole (LP and Cassette)
- Lohman & Barkley's Greatest Hits, Vol. 7 (LP, MGM Records #M3F-4956)
