= Philip Perlman (actor) =

Polish-born American businessman, film and television actor (1919–2015)

- Perlman in Throw Momma from the Train, 1987
- Born: August 15, 1919; Poland
- Died: April 29, 2015 (aged 95); Los Angeles, California, U.S.
- Occupations: Businessman, film and television actor
- Spouse: Adele Perlman (m. 1947)
- Children: Rhea; Heide
- Relatives: Lucy DeVito (granddaughter); Danny DeVito (son-in-law)

Philip Perlman (August 15, 1919 – April 29, 2015) was a Polish-born American businessman, film and television actor.

== Career ==
Perlman became an actor after retiring from a career in the toy business. He played the recurring role of Phil in the NBC sitcomtelevision series Cheers, on which his daughter, Rhea, starred. He appeared in 142 episodes. He also played the same character in one episode of spin-off series Frasier.

Perlman also had roles in several films, including Throw Momma from the Train (1987), Out of Sight (1998), and Man on the Moon (1999), in most of which his son-in-law, Danny DeVito appeared.

== Personal life and death ==
Perlman was born in Poland in 1919. He married Adele (née Miller), in 1947 and they had two daughters, actress Rhea Perlman and script writer Heide Perlman.

Perlman died on April 29, 2015, in Los Angeles, at the age of 95. His widow, Adele, died in 2016.
