= Christopher Hewett =

English actor and theatre director (1922–2001)

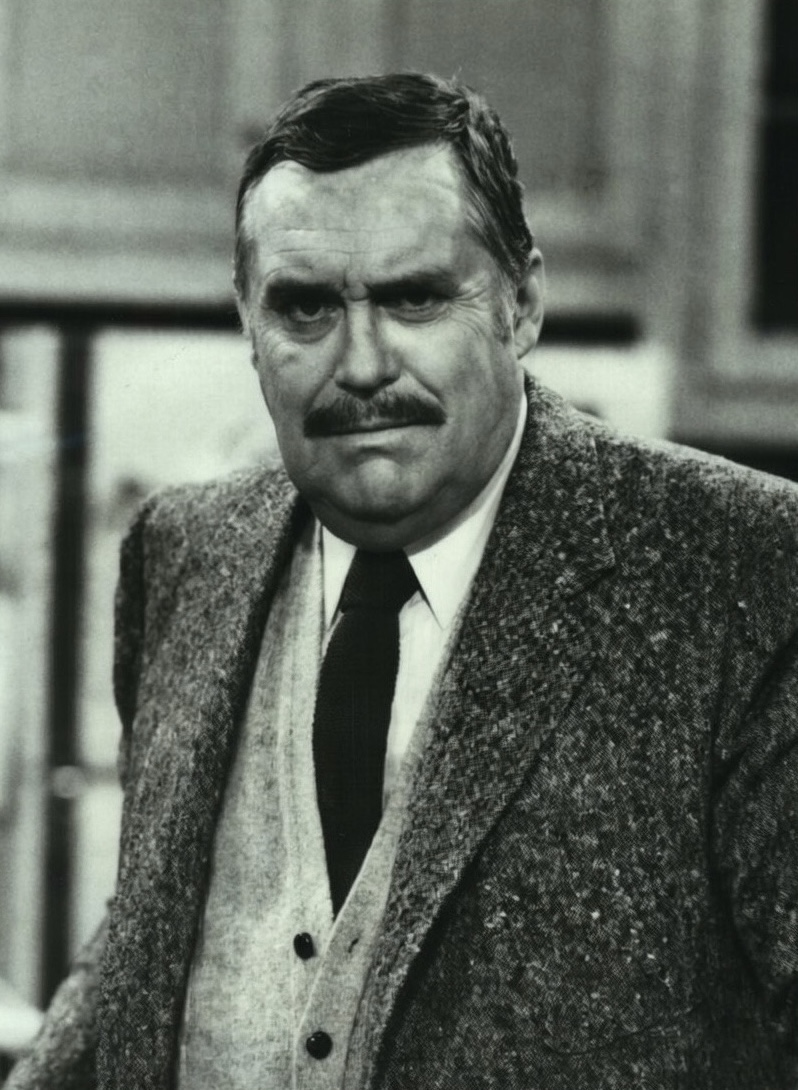
- Hewett as Lynn Aloysius Belvedere in Mr. Belvedere, 1985
- Born: Christopher George Hewett; 5 April 1922; Worthing, Sussex, England
- Died: 3 August 2001 (aged 79); Los Angeles, California, U.S.
- Resting place: Brookwood Cemetery, Brookwood, Surrey, England
- Occupations: Actor; theatre director
- Years active: 1943–1997
- Known for: Lynn Aloysius Belvedere in Mr. Belvedere

Christopher George Hewett (5 April 1922 – 3 August 2001) was an English actor and theatre director best known for his role as Lynn Aloysius Belvedere on the ABC sitcom Mr. Belvedere.

== Career ==
Hewett was born in Worthing, Sussex in 1922 to Christopher Fitzsimon Hewett (an army officer and a descendant of Daniel O'Connell), and his wife Eleanor Joyce Watts (an actress whose professional name was Rhoda Cleighton). He was educated at such Jesuit schools as Beaumont College and at Wimbledon College. At the age of seven, he made his acting debut in a Dublin stage production of A Midsummer Night's Dream. At the age of sixteen, Hewett joined the Royal Air Force, leaving in 1940. He joined the Oxford Repertory Company and made his West End theatre debut in 1943.

He later appeared on Broadway in the musicals: My Fair Lady, First Impressions, The Unsinkable Molly Brown, Music Is and Kean and in the plays Sleuth and The Affair, among others, and directed the 1960 Broadway revue From A to Z and the 1967 Off Broadway revival of the Rodgers and Hart musical By Jupiter. Hewett also directed several stage productions including The Marriage-Go-Round and Beyond the Fringe and Camelot.

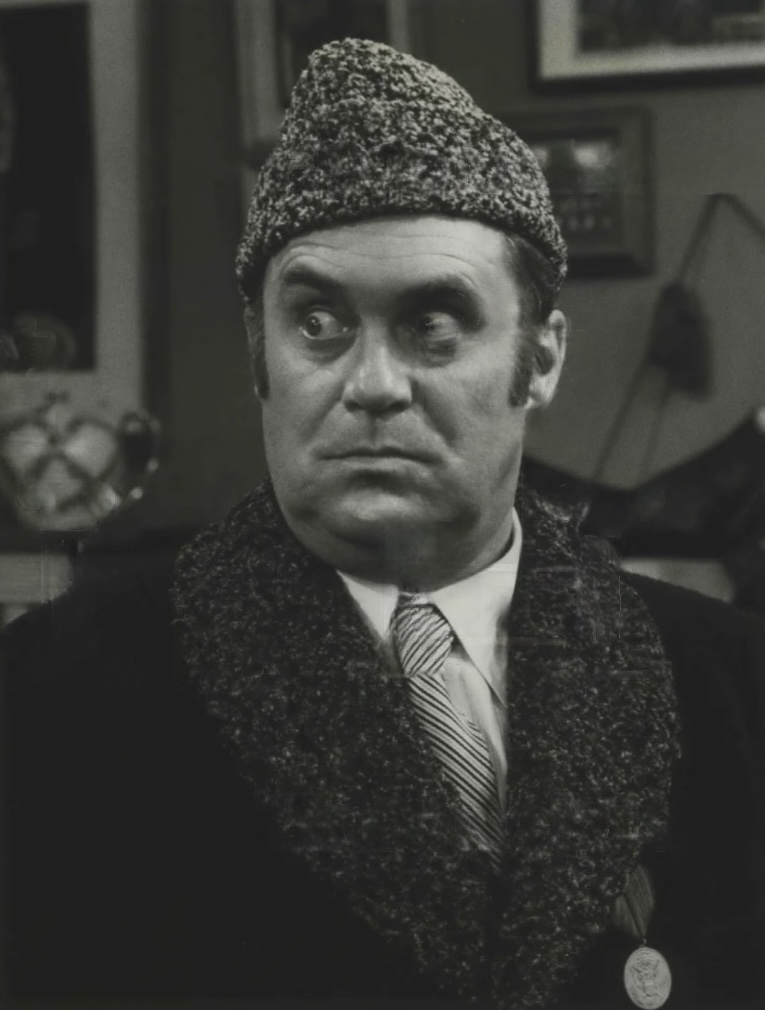
Hewett in Ivan the Terrible, 1976

Hewett made his film debut in the crime drama Pool of London (1951), and later appeared in roles on Robert Montgomery Presents and DuPont Show of the Month. He appeared as the grandiose and camp theatre director Roger DeBris in Mel Brooks's comedy The Producers (1967). In 1976, Hewett played the generic bureaucrat Federov in the short-lived sitcom Ivan the Terrible. During the 1979-80 season he played Captain Hook to Sandy Duncan's Peter Pan on Broadway. From 1983 to 1984 he portrayed Lawrence, Mr. Roarke's (Ricardo Montalbán) sidekick on the final season of the ABC series Fantasy Island.

The following year, Hewett landed his best-known role as Lynn Aloysius Belvedere, an English butler who works for a middle class American family in the sitcom Mr. Belvedere. After the series ended its run in 1990 Hewett appeared in a guest spot on an episode of the NBC teen sitcom California Dreams in 1994. His last on-screen role was a cameo appearance on the Fox series Ned and Stacey in 1997.

== Personal life and death ==
A devout Catholic and lifelong bachelor, Hewett served as a deacon at St. Victor's Church in West Hollywood. During his later years, he suffered from arthritis and diabetes.

Hewett died on 3 August 2001 in his Los Angeles home from complications of diabetes, aged 79. His memorial service was held at St. Victor's Church in West Hollywood on 10 August 2001.

== Filmography ==
Film
Year	Title	Role	Notes
1951	Pool of London	Mike	
1951	The Lavender Hill Mob	Inspector Talbot	
1954	The Million Pound Note	Irate Investor	Uncredited; Alternative title: Man with a Million
1967	The Producers	Roger De Bris	
1986	Ratboy	Acting Coach	

Television
Year	Title	Role	Notes
1955	Robert Montgomery Presents	Major Sanders	Episode: "The Cage"
1959	DuPont Show of the Month	Policeman	Episode: "The Fallen Idol"
1966	The Jackie Gleason Show	Mumbling English Pedestrian	Episode: "The Honeymooners In England"
1976	Ivan the Terrible	Federov	5 episodes
1977	On Our Own		Episode: "Julia's Big Bust"
1979	ABC Afterschool Special	Butler	Episode: "Seven Wishes of a Rich Kid"
1982	The Elephant Man	Ross	Television film
1982	Hart to Hart	Jeremy Lane	Episode: "Vintage Harts"
1982	Massarati and the Brain	Anatole	Television film
1983-1984	Fantasy Island	Lawrence	Main role, 10 episodes
1984	E/R	Englishman	Episode: "Mr. Fix-It"
1985-1990	Mr. Belvedere	Mr. Lynn Aloysius Belvedere	Lead role, 117 episodes
1987	The New Mike Hammer	Hubert "The Umbrella" Wembley	Episode: "Green Blizzard"
1987	Murder, She Wrote	Humphrey Defoe	Episode: "It Runs in the Family"
1989	Mario Ice Capades	King Koopa	Special on ABC.
1990	A Very Retail Christmas	Ghost of Christmas Past	Television film
1993	Where in the World Is Carmen Sandiego?	Himself	Episode: "The Glacier Erasure"
1994	California Dreams	Mr. Green	Episode: "Follow Your Dreams"
1997	Ned and Stacey	Himself	Episode: "Saved by the Belvedere"

== Award nomination ==
Year	Award	Category	Title of work
2004	TV Land Award	Best Broadcast Butler	Mr. Belvedere

== See also ==
- List of Worthing inhabitants
