= Gregory Kingsley =

Child who legally severed his parental ties

Shawn Russ (born Gregory Ralph Kingsley; July 28, 1980) is the first American child, who, at the age of 12 years, legally severed ties with his mother. He changed his name after the juvenile court judge Thomas S. Kirk "ended the parental rights of his natural mother and allowed [his] foster parents to adopt him".

== Family life and foster care ==
The eldest of three children, Kingsley was born in Denver, Colorado, to Rachel Kingsley and Ralph Kingsley Sr., who became estranged from his family, giving Rachel Kingsley custodial rights. Gregory's two younger brothers, Jeremiah and Zachary, remained with their mother, but Gregory went to live with his alcoholic father, who forbade him from having any contact with them. Eventually, Gregory was reunited with his mother and two siblings; however, his mother's drug use prevented her from parenting, and so she voluntarily put her two oldest sons into foster care in 1990. Gregory was placed in a boys shelter, where he met and befriended George H. Russ, who had first come to the shelter as a member of a government commission exploring the "needs of children". He was a father and an attorney, and he empathized with Gregory, having had an unhappy childhood himself. In October 1991, he and his wife Lizabeth agreed to adopt Gregory, bringing him to live with their eight biological children. Gregory Kingsley's Father, Ralph Kingsley, later died in a bizarre accidental shooting accident in 1993.

== Legal action ==
On June 25, 1992, 11-year-old Kingsley filed a petition for termination of the parental rights of his natural parents, as well as a complaint for declaration of rights and adoption by his foster parents. On July 21, 1992, the trial court determined Kingsley had legal standing to initiate the action for termination of parental rights. Between August 11, 1992, and September 11, 1992, four additional petitions for termination of parental rights were filed on behalf of Kingsley: one from his foster father, George Russ; one from his guardian ad litem, Catherine A. Tucker; one from the Department of Health and Rehabilitative Services (HRS); and the last from Kingsley's foster mother, Elizabeth Russ. The lawsuit became widely publicized, and the media referred to him as "Gregory K". George Russ said that he had convinced Gregory to take the "unusual step of seeking the right to sue because he feared that the state might take Gregory out of the Russ' home" if he himself had sued.

=== Initial trial ===
The matter proceeded to trial on September 24, 1992. Rachel Kingsley, his mother, a "30-year-old unemployed waitress", was characterized by a neighbor as someone who "liked to go out partying", and often had different men spend the night with her. When she took the witness stand, she "denied accusations of drug abuse, homosexuality, promiscuity, and child abuse" made by Gregory Kingsley's lawyers, which included foster parent George H. Russ. At the time of the trial, Gregory Kingsley had lived with his biological mother only seven months out of the past eight years. Gregory's biological father did not contest the adoption.

On September 25, 1992, after a televised two‑day trial, Judge Kirk ruled that "by clear and convincing evidence, almost beyond a reasonable doubt, the child has been abandoned and neglected by his mother and that it [would be] in his manifest best interest" to terminate the mother's parental rights. Full custody was awarded to the Russes. After winning the case, he was presented with a T‑shirt that had the name "Shawn Russ" printed on it as well as the number 9 to show he was the Russes' ninth child.

=== Appeal ===
The lawyers of Rachel Kingsley, however, appealed to the Florida Fifth District Court of Appeal in Daytona Beach, Florida. It ruled that the trial court erred in granting standing to a child to divorce his parents. They held that:

1. Although the child lacked legal capacity to institute a proceeding to terminate his parental rights to free himself for adoption by his foster parents, the lower court ruled it was a harmless error, because his foster parents, his guardian ad litem and the State had also filed termination petitions on his behalf;
2. The trial court erred in trying the termination and adoption proceedings simultaneously but that such error was harmless error; and
3. The mother's immediate appeal of the order terminating her parental rights deprived the lower court of the authority to enter an order granting the adoption and, thus, remanded the lower court's adoption order.

== Legacy ==
After the trial, Gregory Kingsley himself said that he "hoped his case would encourage other young people to take action to gain their happiness". Indeed, the case inspired Kimberly Mays, a 14-year-old girl who was switched at birth in 1978 in the hospital she was born in. She decided to take similar legal measures to divorce herself from her biological parents, Ernest and Regina Twigg, who were trying to sue for full custody of her when she wanted to remain with Robert Mays, the man who raised her as his daughter.

=== In popular culture ===
The Gregory K case has been portrayed in two made-for-television films: Switching Parents (1993) with Joseph Gordon-Levitt as Gregory and A Place to Be Loved (1993) with Tom Guiry as Gregory.
