= La Luna (1979 film) =

1979 film directed by Bernardo Bertolucci

- U.S. theatrical release poster (where it was titled as Luna)
- Directed by: Bernardo Bertolucci
- Screenplay by: Giuseppe Bertolucci; Clare Peploe; Bernardo Bertolucci
- Story by: Franco Arcalli; Giuseppe Bertolucci; Bernardo Bertolucci
- Produced by: Giovanni Bertolucci
- Starring: Jill Clayburgh; Matthew Barry; Veronica Lazar; Renato Salvatori; Tomas Milian
- Cinematography: Vittorio Storaro
- Edited by: Gabriella Cristiani
- Music by: Ennio Morricone; Giuseppe Verdi
- Production companies: 20th Century-Fox; Fiction Cinematografica
- Distributed by: 20th Century-Fox
- Release date: September 30, 1979
- Running time: 142 minutes
- Countries: Italy; United States
- Language: English
- Budget: $5.0 million
- Box office: $68.2 million (worldwide)

La Luna (released in the United States as Luna) is a 1979 drama film directed by Bernardo Bertolucci from a screenplay co-written with his brother Giuseppe and wife Clare Peploe. The film concerns the troubled life of a teenage boy and his relationship with his parents, including an incestuous relationship with his opera singer mother. It stars Jill Clayburgh, Matthew Barry, Tomas Milian, Fred Gwynne, Veronica Lazăr, and Alida Valli.

An Italian-American co-production, La Luna was released by 20th Century-Fox on August 29, 1979. It received mixed reviews from critics, though Jill Clayburgh's performance was widely praised, earning her a Golden Globe nomination for Best Actress in a Motion Picture – Drama.

The film is dedicated to Bertolucci's oft-collaborator Franco Arcalli, who died of cancer during pre-production.

== Plot ==
Joe is the son of famous opera singer Caterina Silveri. While he believes that Caterina's husband, Douglas Winter, is his biological father, the truth is that Joe was sired by Caterina's former lover Giuseppe, who is now living in Italy and working as a schoolteacher. Joe, moody and spoiled, needs a strong father figure to guide and discipline him, but Douglas is aloof and largely indifferent to parenting. When Joe witnesses the sudden death of Douglas in New York City, it leaves him angry and distraught. Caterina, unwilling to stay in Manhattan after Douglas' death, decides to move to Italy with her son. There, Joe begins associating with a dangerous crowd and becomes addicted to heroin.

Caterina is heartbroken and hopes to lure her son back to a safer and more healthy lifestyle. She tries in many instances to get closer emotionally to Joe hoping that increased contact will prevail over the allure of the drugs. She even contacts his drug dealer to ask for sympathy for her situation. At one point, when Joe is desperate for a fix, his mother gives him a handjob just to get his mind off drugs temporarily.

Seeing no other alternative, she decides to drive to the location they originally lived, where her estranged lover lives, with the hope that some sort of fatherly bond will cure her son. Along the way, tensions, some sexual, derail and prolong the trip. Eventually the son is dropped off at Giuseppe's home but Joe, rather than telling his father that he is his son, says that he is a friend of his son, and that his son overdosed on heroin after lifelong turmoil over the absence of his biological father. With some sort of closure achieved for the boy, he returns to his mother, who is preparing for an opera. Embracing, they reaffirm their love for each other, and together the son and his father, who has come to watch the performance, and who now knows Joe's true identity as his child, hear Caterina sing at her very best.

== Cast ==
- Jill Clayburgh as Caterina Silveri
- Matthew Barry as Joe Silveri
- Tomas Milian as Giuseppe
- Fred Gwynne as Douglas Winter
- Veronica Lazar as Marina
- Renato Salvatori as Communist
- Alida Valli as Giuseppe's mother
- Elisabetta Campeti as Arianna
- Franco Citti as Barfly
- Roberto Benigni as Upholsterer
- Carlo Verdone as 'Caracalla' Director
- Peter Eyre as Edward
- Mustapha Barat as Mustafa
- Rodolfo Lodi as Giancarlo Calo
- Sara Di Nepi as Concetta
- Laura Betti as Ludovica (uncredited)

== Reception ==
In his two-star review, the critic Roger Ebert wrote of Bertolucci "He's got a soap opera and a Freudian case history (traditional enemies in their natural states) and he's forcing them to copulate".

In the London Review of Books, Angela Carter wrote of Jill Clayburgh's performance "Jill Clayburgh, seizing by the throat the opportunity of working with a great European director, gives a bravura performance: she is like the life force in person".

In an entry dated 7 September 1979, Russian film director Andrei Tarkovsky wrote in his diary, "Saw Bertolucci's La luna. Monstrous, cheap, vulgar rubbish."

The movie was briefly banned in Ecuador in 1980 by Abdalá Bucaram, then major general of the Guayaquil police. Bucaram closed all the theatres that showed the film. The movie, however, was broadcast years later on national TV without any repercussions.

On the review aggregator website Rotten Tomatoes, 50% of 14 critics' reviews are positive.

=== Accolades ===
| Award | Category | Nominee | Outcome |
|---|---|---|---|
| Golden Globe Awards | Best Actress in a Motion Picture – Drama | Jill Clayburgh | Nominated |
| Nastro d'Argento Awards | Best Supporting Actor | Tomas Milian | Won |
| Turkish Film Critics Association Awards | Best Foreign Film | —N/a | 4th place |
