= Lou Jacobi =

Canadian character actor (1913–2009)

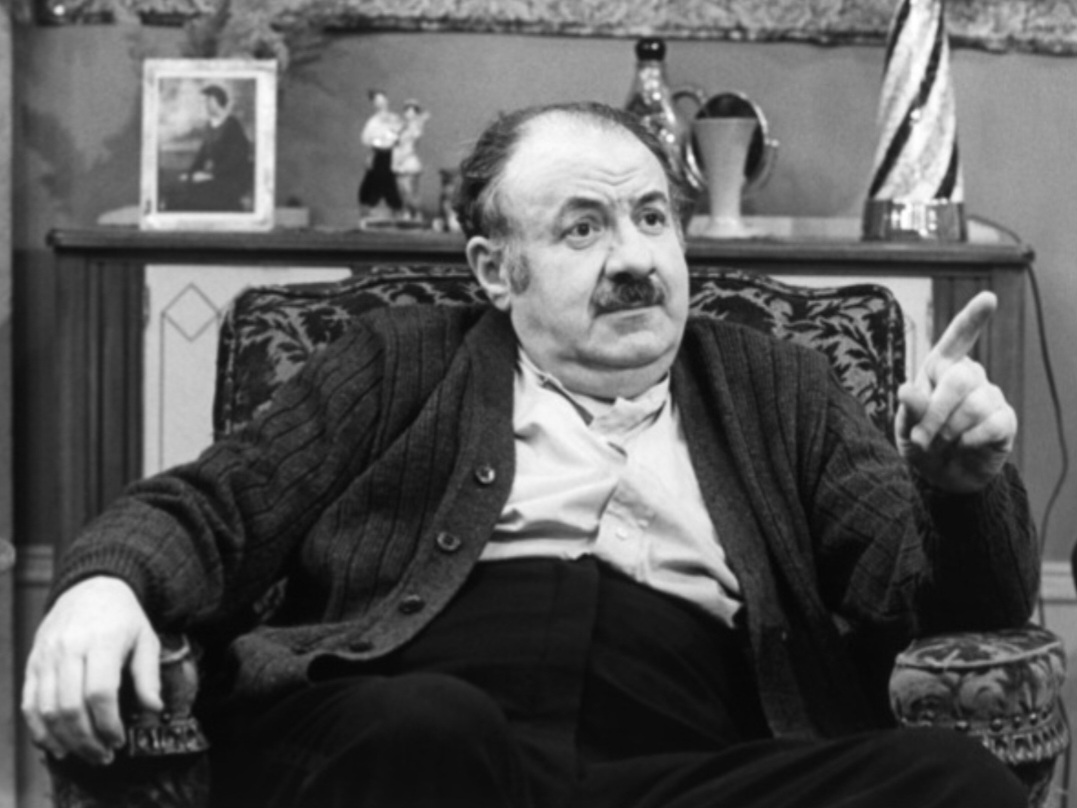
- Jacobi in Ivan the Terrible, 1976
- Born: Louis Harold Jacobovitch; 28 December 1913; Toronto, Ontario, Canada
- Died: 23 October 2009 (aged 95); New York City, New York, U.S.
- Occupation: Actor
- Years active: 1924–1994
- Spouse: Ruth Ludwin (m. 1957; died 2004)

Lou Jacobi (born Louis Harold Jacobovitch; 28 December 1913 – 23 October 2009) was a Canadian actor and comedian, known for his many character roles.

He came to prominence for his role as Mr. Van Daan in the 1955 Broadway production of The Diary of Anne Frank which he reprised in the 1959 film version. He also acted in the films Irma la Douce (1963), Little Murders (1971), Everything You Always Wanted to Know About Sex* (*But Were Afraid to Ask) (1972), Next Stop, Greenwich Village (1976), The Lucky Star (1980), Arthur (1981), My Favorite Year (1982), and Avalon (1990).

== Early life ==
Jacobi was born Louis Harold Jacobovitch in Toronto to Jewish parents Joseph and Fay Jacobovitch. He began acting as a boy, making his stage debut in 1924 at a Toronto theatre, playing a violin prodigy in the Yiddish theatre play The Rabbi and the Priest.

After working as the drama director of the Toronto Y.M.H.A., the social director at a summer resort, a stand-up comic in Muskoka Lakes (Canada's equivalent of the Borscht Belt), and the entertainment at various weddings and bachelor parties, Jacobi moved to Great Britain to work on the London stage, appearing in Guys and Dolls and Pal Joey.

== Career ==
Jacobi's film debut was in the 1953 British comedy, Is Your Honeymoon Really Necessary? with the country's blond sex symbol of the day, Diana Dors. Jacobi made his Broadway debut in 1955 in The Diary of Anne Frank playing Hans van Daan, the less-than-noble occupant of the Amsterdam attic where the Franks were hiding, and reprised the role in the 1959 film version. Other Broadway performances included Paddy Chayefsky’s The Tenth Man (1959), Woody Allen’s Don’t Drink the Water (1966), and Neil Simon’s debut play Come Blow Your Horn (1961), in which he portrayed the playboy protagonist’s disappointed father. His reading of the film line "Aha!" stuck with the Times columnist William Safire so vividly that he cited it when writing about the meaning of the word 40 years later.

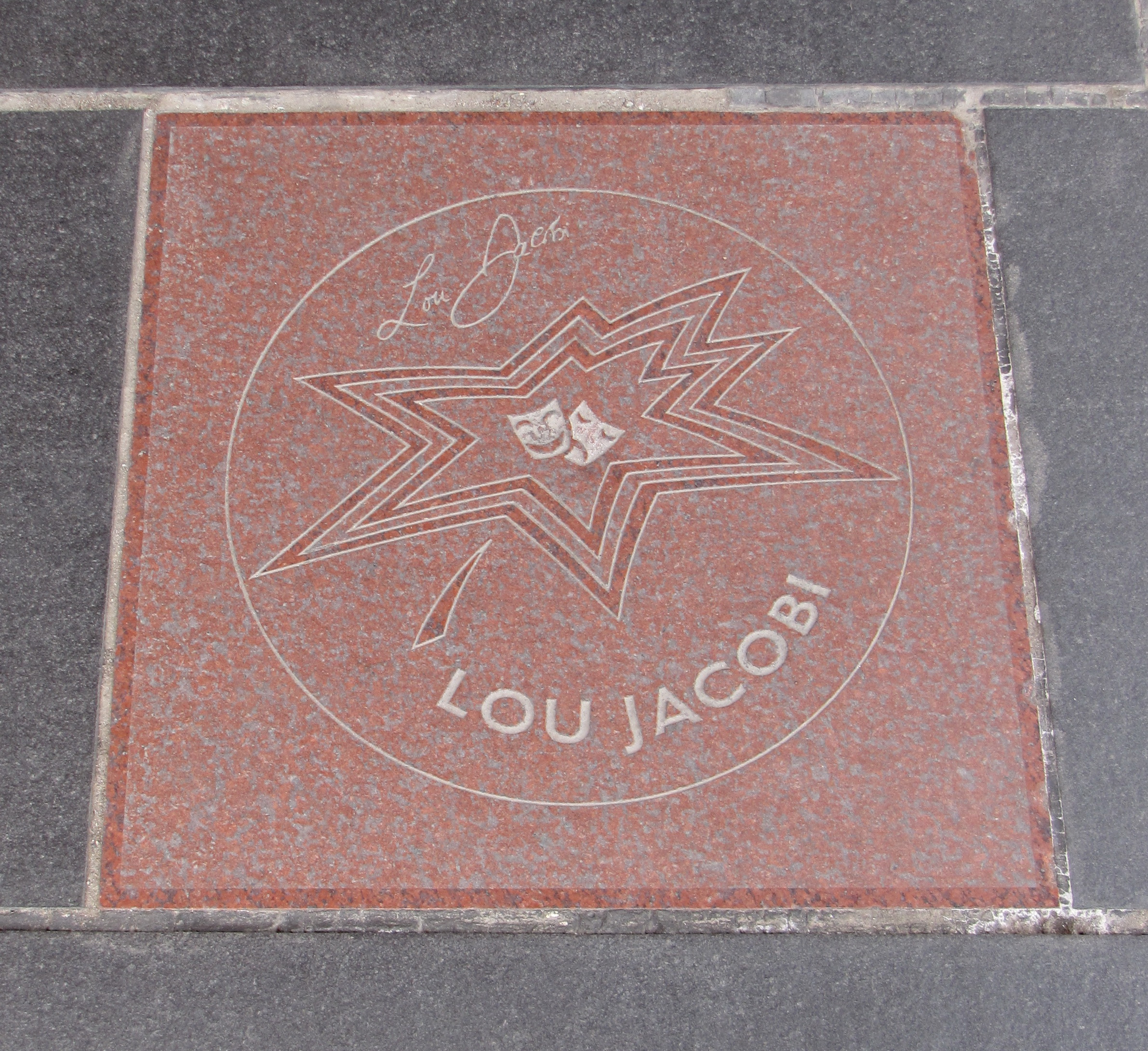
Jacobi's star on Canada's Walk of Fame

Other notable films in which he appeared include Irma la Douce (1963), Penelope (1966), Everything You Always Wanted to Know About Sex* (*But Were Afraid to Ask) (1972) as Sam Musgrave, a middle-aged married man experimenting with women's clothes, Arthur (1981) as the lucky florist, My Favorite Year (1982) as Benjy's unsophisticated Uncle Morty, and in Amazon Women on the Moon (1987), as a man named Murray who got zapped into the television and is wandering throughout sketches looking for his wife. In Barry Levinson's Avalon (1990), in a semi-dramatic role, as one of four Russian brothers (elders) trying to build a future in Baltimore in the early 20th century, with the memorable comic relief catchphrase, "You cut the turkey!?" after he would notoriously arrive late to family Thanksgiving dinner, every year. His final film role was I.Q. (1994), playing philosopher/mathematician Kurt Gödel.

He guest-starred on such television shows as Playhouse 90, Too Close for Comfort, Tales from the Darkside, Love, American Style, That Girl, Sanford and Son, Barney Miller and The Man from U.N.C.L.E., and was a regular on The Dean Martin Show. In the summer of 1976, Jacobi was the star of a CBS comedy series Ivan the Terrible, in which he played a Russian headwaiter living with nine other people in a small Moscow apartment. The series only lasted 5 episodes.

== Recognition ==
In 1999, Jacobi, who was 85 at the time, was inducted into Canada's Walk of Fame. On the occasion of the dedication, film critic Roger Ebert interviewed Jacobi, later writing, "I look at Lou, and I’m not afraid to be 85, if I can get there in Lou's style."

== Personal life and death ==
Jacobi was married to Ruth Ludwin from 1957 until her death in 2004. Jacobi died on October 23, 2009, of natural causes, at his home in Manhattan. He was 95. He was survived by his brother, Avrom Jacobovitch, and sister, Rae Jacobovitch, both of Toronto.

== In popular culture ==
Jacobi was one of the voice inspirations for the Futurama character Dr. Zoidberg.

== Filmography ==
=== Film ===
Year	Title	Role	Notes
1953	Is Your Honeymoon Really Necessary?	Captain Noakes	
1953	The Good Beginning	Bookmaker	Uncredited
1955	A Kid for Two Farthings	Blackie Isaacs	
1956	Charley Moon	Theatre Manager	
1959	The Diary of Anne Frank	Hans Van Daan	
1960	Song Without End	Potin	
1963	Irma la Douce	Moustache	
1966	The Last of the Secret Agents?	Papa Leo	
1966	Penelope	Ducky	
1970	Cotton Comes to Harlem	Goodman	
1971	Little Murders	Judge Stern	
1971	The Battle of Love's Return	Talking Head	Uncredited
1972	Everything You Always Wanted to Know About Sex* (*But Were Afraid to Ask)	Sam	
1976	Next Stop, Greenwich Village	Herb	
1976	Everybody Rides the Carousel	Stage 1 (voice)	Voice
1977	Roseland	Stan	Segment: "The Waltz"
1979	The Magician of Lublin	Wolsky	
1980	The Lucky Star	Elia Goldberg	
1981	Arthur	Plant Store Owner	
1981	Chu Chu and the Philly Flash	Landlord	
1982	My Favorite Year	Uncle Morty	
1984	Isaac Littlefeathers	Abe	
1986	The Boss' Wife	Harry Taphorn	
1987	Amazon Women on the Moon	Murray	Segment: "Murray in Videoland"
1990	Avalon	Gabriel Krichinsky	
1992	I Don't Buy Kisses Anymore	Irving Fein	
1994	I.Q.	Kurt Gödel	Final film role

=== Television ===
Year	Title	Role	Notes
1953-54	Rheingold Theatre	Milton Cassal / Ben	2 episodes
1959	The Texan	Joseph Varga	Episode: "The Peddler"
1959	Playhouse 90	Puigdellevol	Episode: "Child of Our Time"
1960	The Play of the Week	Corvino	Episode: "Volpone"
1962	The Defenders	Mr. Schwartz	Episode: "Grandma TNT"
1963	Sam Benedict	August Brauer	Episode: "Season for Vengeance"
1963	The Alfred Hitchcock Hour	Lieutenant Wolfson	Episode: "Dear Uncle George"
1964	The Alfred Hitchcock Hour	Dr. Glover	Episode: "Ten Minutes from Now"
1965	The Dick Van Dyke Show	Lou Sorrell	Episode: "Young Man with a Shoehorn"
1965	The Trials of O'Brien	Archie	Episode: "The Trouble with Archie"
1966	The Man from U.N.C.L.E.	Arum Tertunian	Episode: "The Nowhere Affair"
1969	That Girl	Leo Schneider	2 episodes
1969-73	Love, American Style	Performer	5 episodes
1971	Make Room for Granddaddy	Mephisto	Episode: "Of Mice and Mini"
1971	The Courtship of Eddie's Father	Frank	Episode: "Tell It Like I'm Telling You"
1971-73	The Dean Martin Show	Sketch performer	52 episodes
1975	Barney Miller	Harry Tannenbaum	Episode: "Stakeout"
1975	Sanford and Son	Max / Bert	Episode: "Steinberg and Son"
1976	Ivan the Terrible	Ivan Petrovsky	Lead role
1977	Captain Kangaroo	Dandy	Episode: "Dandy"
1979	King of Kensington	Spivakofski	Episode: "Pawn to King Four"
1982	Tales of the Unexpected	Waiter	Episode: "In the Bag"
1983-85	Too Close for Comfort	Paul	3 episodes
1984	Tales from the Darkside	Harvey Turman	Episode: "Pain Killer"
1985	Cagney & Lacey	Aaron Seymour	Episode: "American Dream"
1985	St. Elsewhere	Rabbi Singer	Episode: "Cheers"
1986	Melba	Jack	6 episodes
1988	L.A. Law	Sam Harber	Episode: "Leave it to Geezer"
1988	Great Performances	Jacob Glutz	Episode: "The Old Reliable"

== Partial stage credits ==
Year	Title	Role	Author	Venue
1955	The Diary of Anne Frank	Mr. Van Daan	Albert Hackett	Broadway debut
1959	The Tenth Man	Schlissel	Paddy Chayefsky	Booth Theatre, Broadway
1961	Come Blow Your Horn	Mr. Baker	Neil Simon	Brooks Atkinson Theatre, Broadway
1964	Fade Out – Fade In	Lionel Z. Governor	Betty Comden / Adolph Green	Mark Hellinger Theatre, Broadway
1966	Don't Drink the Water	Walter Hollander	Woody Allen	Morosco Theatre, Broadway
1970	Norman, Is That You?	Ben Chambers	Ron Clark	Lyceum Theatre, Broadway
1971	Eli, The Fanatic	Tzuref	Philip Roth	Plymouth Theatre, Broadway
1971	Epstein	Epstein	Philip Roth	Plymouth Theatre, Broadway
1972	The Sunshine Boys	Al Lewis	Neil Simon	Broadhurst Theatre, Broadway
1978	Cheaters	Howard	Michael Jacobs	Biltmore Theatre, Broadway
