= Chris Nashawaty =

American film critic and writer

Chris Nashawaty (born 1969) is a former movie critic for Entertainment Weekly. He currently works at Netflix Tudum.

Nashawaty is the author of the book The Future Was Now published in 2024.

== Education and career ==
Nashawaty has a master's degree in journalism from Northwestern University. He also has a bachelor's degree in arts from Connecticut College.

After college, Nashawaty was a reporter for Reuters in Jerusalem. Then he became a writer, editor, and movie critic for Entertainment Weekly (EW). He spent 25 years at EW.

Nashawaty has reviewed a book for The New York Times. He has written for Sports Illustrated as well as Inc.. His articles have also appeared in Fast Company and AARP. Nashawaty's writing has appeared in Esquire and Esquire UK.

== Books ==
Anthony Lane reviewed The Future Was Now in The New Yorker. Chris Vognar reviewed the book for the Los Angeles Times. Vanity Fair published an excerpt from the book. Mike Householder reviewed The Future Was Now in The Associated Press. Wired magazine published an adapted excerpt from the book. Hamilton Cain reviewed the book in the Minnesota Star Tribune. The Seattle Times republished the review.

Allan Fallow reviewed Nashawaty's book Caddyshack in The Washington Post. The 2018 book is about the 1980 sports comedy film Caddyshack starring Chevy Chase, Rodney Dangerfield, Ted Knight, Michael O'Keefe, and Bill Murray.

Nashawaty's book on the American film producer Roger Corman — published in 2013 and titled Crab Monsters, Teenage Cavemen, and Candy Stripe Nurses: Roger Corman: King of the B Movie — was reviewed in The New York Times by Jason Zinoman. Roger Ebert published an excerpt from the book.

Nashawaty is listed as one of three editors, alongside Chad Oppenheim and Matt Stone, on the 2025 book RIDE - Most Iconic Wheels of the Silver Screen (For Movie & Car Lovers). The foreword was provided by Jay Leno.

== Personal life ==
Nashawaty lives in Los Angeles with his family.
