= Rhea Perlman =

American actress (born 1948)

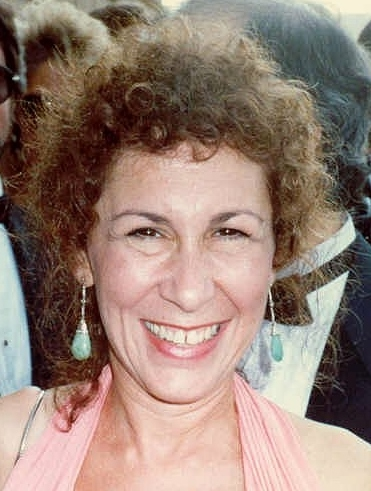
- Perlman at the 1988 Emmy Awards
- Born: Rhea Jo Perlman; March 31, 1948 (age 78); New York City, U.S.
- Education: Hunter College (BA)
- Occupations: Actress; author
- Years active: 1972–present
- Height: 5 ft 0 in (1.52 m)
- Spouse: Danny DeVito (m. 1982; sep. 2012)
- Children: 3, including Lucy DeVito
- Father: Philip Perlman
- Relatives: Heide Perlman (sister); Randall Miller (cousin)

Rhea Jo Perlman (/ˈriːə/ REE-ə; born March 31, 1948) is an American actress and author. She is well-known for playing head waitress Carla Tortelli in the popular sitcom Cheers (1982–1993). Over the course of 11 seasons, Perlman was nominated for 10 Emmy Awards for Outstanding Supporting Actress, winning four, and was nominated for a record six Golden Globe Awards for Best Supporting Actress in a Television Series. She has also appeared in films, including Canadian Bacon (1995), Matilda (1996), The Sessions (2012), Poms (2019) and Barbie (2023). In 2025, Perlman had a guest role in the second season of the crime mystery series Poker Face.

== Early life ==
Perlman was born on March 31, 1948, in Coney Island, Brooklyn, to Philip Perlman, a Polish Jewish immigrant who was a manager at a doll parts factory, and Adele Perlman, a bookkeeper. She grew up in nearby Bensonhurst in a Jewish family with additional roots in Russia. Perlman has a younger sister, Heide, who is a television writer, story editor, and producer who worked on Cheers, Frasier, and The Tracey Ullman Show. In the mid-1980s, Perlman's parents moved to Los Angeles, and her father became an extra on Cheers. His character became known by his real name, Phil, and he managed to get a few lines over the years as Philip Perlman appeared in more than 30 episodes. He created a second career as a character actor, appearing in several films and television shows, including Throw Momma from the Train, Hoffa and Frasier.

Perlman studied drama at Hunter College in New York, earning a Bachelor of Arts degree in 1968.

Film director Randall Miller is Perlman's cousin.

== Career ==
=== Career beginnings ===
Perlman began her acting career with a small role as an attendant in the off-off-Broadway play Dracula Sabbat, which ran from September 1970 to June 1971. In 1972, she played a bit role in the film Hot Dogs for Gauguin. That same year, she appeared in Westbeth Playwrights Feminist Collective's production of Up – An Uppity Revue, along with her future husband, Danny DeVito.

One of Perlman's first notable parts was a recurring role on the television show Taxi as Zena, the sweet girlfriend of Louie De Palma (played by DeVito). Following that, she had a role in a small play portraying a much tougher character. Producers Glen and Les Charles saw Perlman in that play, which led to her landing the role as wisecracking barmaid Carla Tortelli on their sitcom Cheers in 1982.

=== Cheers ===
The series struggled with ratings in its first season, but by the time it ended in 1993, it was one of the most popular and successful sitcoms of all time, winning 20 Emmy awards out of a total 95 nominations.

Perlman won the Emmy Award for Outstanding Supporting Actress in a Comedy four times: in 1984, 1985, 1986, and 1989. Over her 11 seasons on Cheers, Perlman was nominated for an Emmy every year but 1992, becoming the Cheers star to have the most wins and nominations. She was also nominated for a Golden Globe for Best Supporting Actress six times, more than anyone else in that category. In 2011, NBC named Carla Tortelli as one of the greatest TV characters of all time.

In 1986, Perlman starred in an episode of Steven Spielberg's Amazing Stories titled "The Wedding Ring," which also starred DeVito as her character's husband.

=== Motion pictures ===
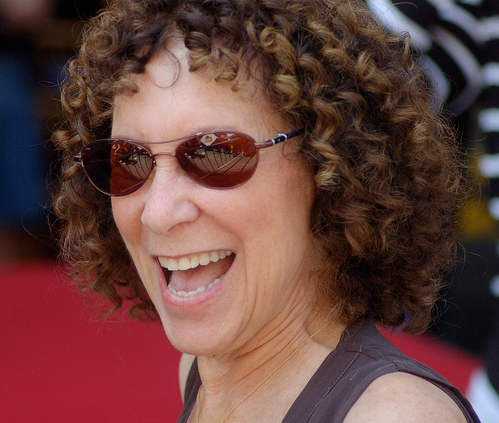
Perlman at a ceremony for Danny DeVito to receive a star on the Hollywood Walk of Fame, 2011

In the 1990s, Perlman starred in several TV movies and motion pictures. In 1992, she starred in the made-for-TV-movie, To Grandmother's House We Go opposite Ashley Olsen and Mary-Kate Olsen, playing the wife of Jerry Van Dyke's character; the couple kidnapped the Olsen Twins' characters, hoping to cash in on ransom before Christmas. Other TV films in which Perlman starred included the dramas A Place to Be Loved and In Spite of Love. Her motion picture roles included There Goes The Neighborhood (1992), Canadian Bacon (1995), Carpool (1996), Sunset Park (1996), and Matilda (1996). Perlman had a cameo in the film 10 Items Or Less (2006), and also starred in the 2007 independent film Love Comes Lately.

In 1994, Perlman voiced 9-Eye in The Timekeeper, a Circle-Vision show at the Magic Kingdom in Tomorrowland. She later starred in the 1996 sitcom Pearl as the title character and was featured on the 2001 TV drama Kate Brasher. Among Perlman's notable guest appearances was on the fourth-season premiere of Becker, which starred Cheers co-star Ted Danson. She also appeared in a 2000 television film How to Marry a Billionaire: A Christmas Tale, in which Perlman impersonated Jackie Kennedy. That same year, Perlman portrayed a therapist called Dr. Parella in the film Secret Cutting, which follows the story of a young girl named Dawn who self-injures. In 2007, Perlman appeared as Bertha in the West End of London in the comedy Boeing Boeing. The following year, she starred in the Hallmark Channel original movie, The Christmas Choir, and appeared in Beethoven's Big Break as Patricia Benji. In 2009, Perlman appeared as Tanya's mother on the series Hung for Home Box Office Networks. Two years later, Perlman had a guest appearance as Mittens in one episode of Wilfred.

In 2009, Perlman and her daughter Lucy DeVito starred in the off-Broadway play Love, Loss, and What I Wore, adapted by Nora and Delia Ephron, at the Westside Theatre. From 2014 to 2017, Perlman starred in a recurring role on The Mindy Project as Danny's mother, Annette Castellano.

In 2023, Perlman earned critical praise for playing Barbie creator Ruth Handler in Greta Gerwig's film Barbie.

=== Writing ===
Perlman is the author of the illustrated children's book series Otto Undercover, whose six books to date (as of the middle of May 2012) are Born to Drive, Canyon Catastrophe, Water Balloon Doom, Toxic Taffy Takeover, The Brink of Ex-stink-tion, and Brain Freeze.

== Personal life ==
Perlman with her husband Danny DeVito in 2006

Perlman met Danny DeVito on January 17, 1971, when she went to see a friend in the single performance of the play The Shrinking Bride, which also featured DeVito. They moved in together two weeks after meeting and got married on January 28, 1982. They have three children: Lucy, Grace, and Jacob. Perlman, who is Jewish, and DeVito, who was raised Catholic, raised their children celebrating the major holidays of both religions, but did not want to force or compel any religious identity or affiliation. Perlman told the Los Angeles Times in 1998:

We do all the holidays to keep the traditions and the culture going, but I truly don't have a great feeling about any particular organized religion, and I don't think it's right to impose one on my kids. I feel like I'm bringing them up to be good people, and that's what it's about.

In addition to their three children, Perlman and DeVito also have two grandchildren.

The family resided in Beverly Hills, California, and they owned a vacation home in Interlaken, New Jersey that they frequented to get away from Los Angeles. Throughout their relationship, Perlman and DeVito have acted alongside each other several times, including in the TV show Taxi and the feature film Matilda.

Perlman and DeVito separated in October 2012. However, in March 2013, it was reported that they had reconciled. The couple later separated again for a second time in March 2017 on amicable terms. Although the two no longer live together, Perlman said that she has no intention of divorcing DeVito. In 2019, Perlman told interviewer Andy Cohen that she and DeVito have become closer friends after their separation than they were in their final years as a couple.

== Filmography ==
=== Film ===
Year	Title	Role	Notes
1972	Hot Dogs for Gauguin	Woman on Ferry	Short film
1979	Swap Meet	Mother	
1982	National Lampoon's Movie Madness	The Little Jewish Prostitute	
1982	Love Child	June Burns	
1985	Molly and the Skywalkerz: Happily Ever After	Rose Johnson	Voice; television film for PBS, later VHS video
1986	My Little Pony: The Movie	Reeka	Voice
1989	Molly and the Skywalkerz: Two Daddies?	Rose Johnson	Voice; television film for PBS, later VHS video
1990	Enid Is Sleeping	Mavis	
1991	The Last Halloween	Mrs. Gizborne	
1991	Ted and Venus	Grace	
1992	To Grandmother's House We Go	Shirley	
1992	Class Act	Ms. Simpson	
1992	There Goes the Neighborhood	Lydia Nunn	
1993	We're Back! A Dinosaur's Story	Mother Bird	Voice
1995	Canadian Bacon	Honey	
1996	Sunset Park	Phyllis Saroka	
1996	Carpool	Martha	
1996	Matilda	Zinnia Wormwood	
2001	Old Love		Short film
2006	10 Items or Less	Mrs. D	
2007	Bloom	Ma	Short film
2007	Love Comes Lately	Riesel	
2008	Cat Dragged In	Woman in Street	Short film
2008	Beethoven's Big Break	Patricia	
2011	The Trouble with Bliss	Maria	Scenes cut
2012	The Sessions	Mikvah Lady	
2015	I'll See You in My Dreams	Sally	
2016	Sing	Judith	Voice
2017	Lemon	Esther	
2018	Half Magic	Linda	
2018	The Matchmaker	Irene	Short film
2019	Saving Flora	Gabriella	
2019	Poms	Alice	
2020	Funny Face	Fernie	
2021	Marvelous and the Black Hole	Margot	
2022	13: The Musical	Grandma Ruth	
2023	You People	Bubby	
2023	Barbie	Ruth Handler	Nominated–Screen Actors Guild Award for Outstanding Performance by a Cast in a Motion Picture

=== Television ===
Year	Title	Role	Notes
1976	Stalk the Wild Child	Jean	Television film
1976	I Want to Keep My Baby!	Rae Finer	Television film
1977	Mary Jane Harper Cried Last Night	Judy	Television film
1977	Having Babies II	Cheryl	Uncredited; Television film
1977	Intimate Strangers	Unknown	Television film
1979	Like Normal People	Jan	Television film
1979–1982	Taxi	Zena Sherman	5 episodes
1982	The Selling of Vince D'Angelo	Mrs. D'Angelo	Television film
1982	Drop Out Father	Tawney Shapiro	Television film
1982–1993	Cheers	Carla Tortelli / Annette Lozupone (one episode)	Main role American Comedy Award for Funniest Supporting Female in a Television Series; Primetime Emmy Award for Outstanding Supporting Actress in a Comedy Series (1984–86, 1989); Viewers for Quality Television Award for Best Supporting Actress in a Quality Comedy Series; Nominated—American Comedy Award for Funniest Supporting Female in a Television Series; Nominated—Golden Globe Award for Best Supporting Actress – Series, Miniseries or Television Film (1985, 1987–90, 1992); Nominated—Primetime Emmy Award for Outstanding Supporting Actress in a Comedy Series (1983, 1987–88, 1990–91, 1993)
1983	Likely Stories, Vol. 2	Vince's Wife	Television film
1983	Saturday Night Live	Herself (co-host)	Episode: "Danny DeVito & Rhea Perlman / Eddy Grant"
1984	The Ratings Game	Francine Kester	Voice, television film
1985	A Girl Named Alida	Rose Johnson	Voice, television film
1985	St. Elsewhere	Carla Tortelli	Episode: "Cheers"
1986	Amazing Stories	Lois	Episode: "The Wedding Ring"
1986	Annie	Rose Johnson	Voice, 12 episodes
1987	The Tortellis	Carla Tortelli	Episode: "Pilot"
1987	Stamp of a Killer	Claudia	Television film
1988	A Family Again	Aunt Dee	Television film
1989	Alida's Problem?	Rose Johnson	Television film
1990	The Earth Day Special	Paula	Television special
1991	Blossom	The Godmother	Episode: "Dad's Girlfriend"
1991	Sesame Street	The Old Woman Who Lives in a Shoe	Episode: "The Old Woman Who Lives in a Shoe's house arrives on Sesame Street"
1992	Roc	Connie Mason	Episode: "The Stan Who Came to Dinner"
1993	A Place to Be Loved	Jerri Blair	Television film
1994	The Simpsons	Carla Tortelli	Voice, episode: "Fear of Flying"
1994	In Spite of Love	Emma	Television film
1994	All-Star 25th Birthday: Stars and Street Forever!	Worm TV Host	Television film
1995	The Critic	Ardeth	Voice, 2 episodes
1996–1997	Pearl	Pearl Caraldo	22 episodes
1997	Union Square	Mrs. Eileen Mulrooney	Episode: "Harassed"
1997	Almost Perfect	Rhea Perlman	Episode: "Dating for Ratings"
1998	In the Doghouse	Phil Markowitz	Television film
1998	Houdini	Esther	Television film
1999	H-E Double Hockey Sticks	Mrs. Beelzebub	Television film
1999	Mad About You	Ramona	Episode: "Valentine's Day"
2000	A Tale of Two Bunnies	Thelma	Television film
2000	Secret Cutting	Dr. Parella	Television film
2000	How to Marry a Billionaire: A Christmas Tale	Jacqueline Kennedy	Television film
2001	Ally McBeal	Dr. Helen Tooth	Episode: "Falling Up"
2001	Kate Brasher	Abbie Shaeffer	6 episodes
2001	Becker	Dr. Katherine Simmons	Episode: "Psycho Therapy"
2002	Frasier	Carla Tortelli	Episode: "Cheerful Goodbyes"
2002	What's New, Scooby-Doo?	Agnes	Voice, episode: "A Scooby-Doo Halloween"
2003	Karen Sisco	Louise Salchek	Episode: "Dumb Bunnies"
2003	Other People's Business	Mrs. Wabash	Television film
2004	Kevin Hill	Eleanor Frank	Episode: "Homework"
2006	Crumbs	Camile Spadaro	Episode: "A Loon Again, Naturally"
2006	Stroller Wars	Penny	Television film
2008	Law & Order: Special Victims Unit	Roxana Fox	Episode: "Unorthodox"
2008	The Christmas Choir	Sister Agatha	Television film
2009–2010	Hung	Vera-Joan Skagle	4 episodes
2011	Wilfred	Mittens	Episode: "Compassion"
2011	Oliver's Ghost	Eloise	Television film
2012	Hot in Cleveland	Jacki	Episode: "Everything Goes Better with Vampires"
2012	The Manzanis	Camille	Pilot
2012–2013	Robot and Monster	Nessie	Voice, 13 episodes
2013	Robot Chicken	Crypt Keeper's Wife / Grandmother / Witch	Voice, episode: "Caffeine-Induced Aneurysm"
2013–2014	Kirstie	Thelma	12 episodes
2014	The Neighbors	Janet	Episode: "Uncle Benjamin"
2014–2017	The Mindy Project	Annette Castellano	17 episodes
2015	Getting On	Crystal Buff	Episode: "No, I Don't Want a Fucking Smiley Face"
2016	Mom	Anya	Episode: "Diabetic Lesbians and a Blushing Bride"
2016	Brooklyn Nine-Nine	Estelle	Episode: "Coral Palms, Part 1"
2017	Me and My Grandma	Grandma Skalecki	6 episodes
2017	Tim & Eric's Bedtime Stories	Maureen	Episode: "The Duke"
2018	Shooter	Associate Justice Gibson	2 episodes
2019	The Goldbergs	Margot Letien	Episode: "Food in a Geoffy"
2019	Harley Quinn	Golda	Voice, episode: "Being Harley Quinn"
2021–2023	Star Wars: The Bad Batch	Cid	Voice, 11 episodes
2022	Little Demon	Durlawn	Voice, episode: "Wet Bodies"
2023	Accused	Joyce	Episode: "Brenda's Story"
2023	Not Dead Yet	Janice	Episode: "Not A Fairytale Yet"
2023	It's Always Sunny in Philadelphia	Bertha Fussy	Episode: "The Gang Gets Cursed"
2023–2025	Poker Face	Beatrix Hasp	5 episodes
2023–present	Curses!	Margie	Voice, 10 episodes
2025	Mid-Century Modern	Judy	Episode: "Love Thy Neighbor"
2025	The Studio	Matt's Mom	2 episodes
2025	Too Much	Dottie	6 episodes

=== Stage ===
Year	Title	Role	Notes
2002	The Tale of the Allergist's Wife	Marjorie (Replacement)	Ethel Barrymore Theatre, Broadway
2007	Boeing-Boeing	Berthe	Comedy Theatre, London
2018	Good for Otto	Nora	The New Group, Off-Broadway
2023	Let's Call Her Patty	Patty	Lincoln Center Theatre, Off-Broadway
