= Joycelyn O'Brien =

American actress

- Education: Northwestern University; Royal Academy of Dramatic Art
- Occupation: Actress
- Years active: 1989—1997
- Known for: Oscar; The Mambo Kings; Allegiance

Joycelyn O'Brien is an American actress who has appeared in American theater, film and television. She has appeared in several made-for-television movies, as well as episodes of television series such as Star Trek: The Next Generation, Quantum Leap, The Nut House, and New Adam-12. She also played a maid in the movie Oscar (1991) and Gina in the movie The Mambo Kings (1992). She has acted in over a dozen plays, including Biloxi Blues and Brighton Beach Memoirs.

== Biography ==
O'Brien is from Chicago, Illinois. She attended Northwestern University for drama, and spent a year at Royal Academy of Dramatic Art in London.

== Theater ==
She has been in several plays, including a role on Broadway in Biloxi Blues by Neil Simon, and the prequel Brighton Beach Memoirs.

== Film and television ==
O'Brien appeared in The Nut House episode 21 Men and a Baby (1989), the Star Trek: The Next Generation episode Allegiance (1990), the Quantum Leap episode Dreams (1991), and the New Adam-12 episode Families (1991).

She has appeared in eight television movies, including 1990 TV film Rock Hudson, When Time Expires (1997), Indictment: The McMartin Trial (1995), and Roseanne: An Unauthorized Biography (1994).

Her first movie role was as the housemaid of a Mafia don, played by Sylvester Stallone, in the movie Oscar (1991). She also appeared in The Mambo Kings (1992) as Gina.
