= Matthew Barry =

American actor and casting director

Matthew Barry (born September 5, 1962) is an American actor and casting director. He made his film debut in Bernardo Bertolucci's La Luna (1979). As a casting director in Hollywood, Barry worked on films including Rush Hour (1998) and The Notebook (2003).
