= Ken Minyard =

American radio personality

Ken Minyard (born in 1939) is a radio personality. He was featured on KABC-AM (790) radio's morning Newstalk show in the early 1970s, but he is best remembered for partnering with Bob Arthur on the "Ken and Bob Company" morning radio program on KABC-AM Los Angeles, California from 1973–1990. The pair coined the term "EGBOK" meaning “everything’s gonna be OK.” The "Ken and Bob Company" was Los Angeles' #1 rated radio show for almost 20 years on KABC.

After Arthur retired in 1990, Minyard soldiered on alone briefly, then partnered with Roger Barkley (of the former Los Angeles morning radio show Lohman and Barkley on KFWB and later KFI) for an additional 6 years, but the morning Los Angeles radio market was growing very competitive, particularly from an increasing number of FM morning talk shows. One Monday morning, Los Angeles tuned in to find that Roger Barkley was gone and Minyard was continuing with a new format. He commented at the time that Barkley was upset, but that the station demanded a change. "Talk radio, and radio in general, is tough", he once remarked. "You won't work forever". But Ken Minyard still had many more good years on Los Angeles radio. Ken hosted a 1986 pilot for a new TV version of the radio and TV game show Can You Top This?

Later he partnered with Peter Tilden on KABC and also had a 2-year pairing on a syndicated show with his son, Rick. During the 80's Minyard was also a regular on the syndicated Dinah Shore Show on TV for 2 seasons. In 1988, he made a guest appearance on the television show Married... with Children. He left KABC, but later returned to that station for the final segment of his morning radio career. On October 15, 2004, after thirty-five years of being on the radio in Los Angeles, Minyard announced his retirement on the morning KABC show.

Ken Minyard and Bob Arthur were awarded a star on the Hollywood Walk of Fame.

Since the 2024 re-election of Trump, Minyard has posted political commentary videos on Facebook and on YouTube.

== Partial filmography ==
- Angels Revenge (1979) - Joe
- The Dark (1979) - T.V. Sportscaster
- The Return (1980) - Federal Agent #1
- The Naked Gun: From the Files of Police Squad! (1988) - Ken & (final film role)
