= Robert Arthur (radio announcer) =

American journalist (born 1921)

Robert "Bob" Arthur (June 21, 1921 – March 25, 1997) was a radio personality, a television newscaster and a motion picture actor. He is best remembered for partnering with Ken Minyard on the "Ken and Bob Company" morning radio program on KABC-AM (790) Los Angeles, California, from 1973 to 1990. The pair coined the popular term "EGBOK" meaning “everything’s gonna be OK.”

As an actor, Arthur had roles in The Naked Gun: From the Files of Police Squad! (1988), True Confessions (1981), and Skin Deep (1989)

Born Joseph Arthur Prince in Kansas, Arthur studied journalism in college and began his career in Wichita. He was an anchorman at KOAT-TV in Albuquerque, New Mexico before coming to Los Angeles in the mid-1960s to work for KTLA/Channel 5. He later moved to LA's KNX radio, and after two years at KNX, he moved to LA's KABC radio in 1969 as a newsman. He retired in 1990, to devote more time to a project setting up care homes for Alzheimer's patients in Long Beach. Arthur died March 25, 1997, at his home in Albuquerque.

For their contribution to radio, Bob Arthur and Ken Minyard were awarded a Star on the Hollywood Walk of Fame at 6808 Hollywood Boulevard in Hollywood, California.
