= Michael Barrie =

American screenwriter

- Born: January 15, 1946 (age 80); The Bronx, New York, U.S.
- Education: New York University
- Occupation: Screenwriter

Michael Barrie (born January 15, 1946) is an American screenwriter. He was nominated for twenty Primetime Emmy Awards in the category Outstanding Writing for a Variety Series for his work on the television programs The Tonight Show Starring Johnny Carson and Late Show with David Letterman.

== Selected filmography ==
- Amazon Women on the Moon (1987)
- Oscar (1991)
- Bad Boys (1995)
