= Jim Mulholland =

American screenwriter

- Born: Rockville Centre, New York
- Occupation: Screenwriter
- Years active: 1968−present

Jim Mulholland is an American television writer and film screenwriter. He was born in Rockville Centre, New York.

== Career ==
At nineteen, he was the youngest writer ever on The Tonight Show Starring Johnny Carson. He has since won a Writers Guild Award and has received twenty Emmy nominations in the late-night comedy category. He co-wrote the screenplays for Amazon Women on the Moon, Oscar, The Ratings Game, Bad Boys, and television specials including SCTV comedy special Public Enemy #2.

== Filmography ==
- Favorite Deadly Sins (TV movie) (segment "Greed") (1995)
- Bad Boys (1995)
- Public Enemy #2 (1993)
- Basic Values: Sex, Shock & Censorship in the 90's (TV movie) (1993)
- Life As We Know It! (TV movie) (1991)
- Oscar (screenplay) (1991)
- Amazon Women on the Moon (writer) (1987)
- Many Happy Returns (TV movie) (1986)
- The Ratings Game (TV movie) (writer) (1984)
- Welcome to the Fun Zone (TV movie) (1984)
- Focus on Fishko (Short) (writer) (1983)
- Likely Stories, Vol. 2 (TV movie) (1983)
- Likely Stories, Vol. 4 (TV movie) (1983)
- The Selling of Vince D'Angelo (TV movie) (1983)
