= David Jablin =

- Occupations: Producer, director

David Jablin is a producer and director of film and television comedies. In 1981 he created and produced the comedy anthology series Likely Stories for HBO/Cinemax.

Jablin produced and directed the film The Don's Analyst, and directed, produced and executive-produced other National Lampoon films.
