= Danny DeVito filmography =

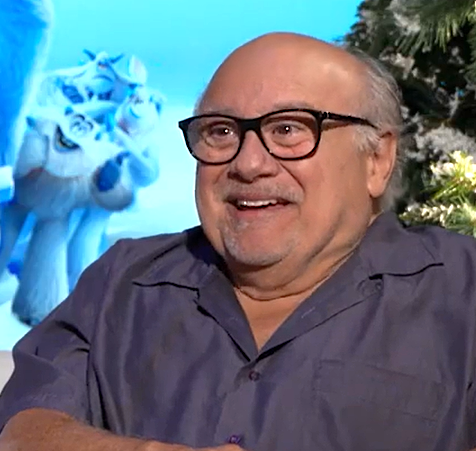
DeVito talking about the making of Smallfoot in 2018

Danny DeVito is an American actor and filmmaker, who has been active in film since the 1970s. One of his earliest and most notable roles was in the sitcom Taxi (1978–1983). He played the role Martini in One Flew Over the Cuckoo's Nest in 1975 alongside Jack Nicholson. In the 70s and 80s, he appeared in Car Wash (1976), The Van (1977), Terms of Endearment (1983), Romancing the Stone (1984) and its sequel The Jewel of the Nile (1985), Ruthless People (1986), Throw Momma from the Train (1987), Twins (1988), and The War of the Roses (1989). In 1992, he was cast in the role of the villain Penguin opposite Michael Keaton's Batman in Batman Returns. In the 90's, he starred in Renaissance Man (1994), and co-starred in the films Get Shorty with Gene Hackman (1995), Matilda with wife Rhea Perlman, which he also directed and produced. He played George Shapiro in 1999's Man on the Moon opposite Jim Carrey, who played Andy Kaufman, a real-life friend of DeVito's.

He appeared in his third movie with Bette Midler in 2000's Drowning Mona (2000), and his fourth movie with John Travolta in 2005's Be Cool. He added his voice to the 2012 film The Lorax, and co-starred with Keaton again in Dumbo as Max Medici (2019). He appeared in the sequel film Jumanji: The Next Level (2019).

DeVito played the role of Louie De Palma in the television series Taxi from 1978 to 1983, airing in 114 episodes. That role earned him a Golden Globe Award for Best Supporting Actor – Series, Miniseries or Television Film (1979) and a Primetime Emmy Award for Outstanding Supporting Actor in a Comedy Series (1980). He guest starred in several television series over the years such as Starsky and Hutch (1977), Friends (2004) and The Simpsons (1991, 1992, 2013, 2024). He has starred in the television series It's Always Sunny in Philadelphia as Frank Reynolds since 2006.

He and wife Rhea Perlman founded the production company Jersey Films in 1992, which have produced such films as Pulp Fiction (1994), Gattaca (1997), Erin Brockovich (2000), and Garden State (2004).

== As actor ==
=== Film ===
Year	Title	Role	Notes	Refs.
1970	Dreams of Glass	Thug		
1971	Lady Liberty	Fred Mancuso		
1972	Hot Dogs for Gauguin	Adrian	Short film	
1973	Hurry Up, or I'll Be 30	Petey		
1973	Scalawag	Fly Speck		
1975	One Flew Over the Cuckoo's Nest	Martini		
1975	Deadly Hero	Harry		
1976	Car Wash	Joe	Deleted scenes	
1976	The Money	Bartender		
1977	The Van	Andy		
1977	The World's Greatest Lover	Assistant Director		
1978	Goin' South	'Hog'		
1979	Swap Meet	Max		
1979	Valentine	Dewey	Made-for-TV film	
1981	Going Ape!	Lazlo		
1983	Terms of Endearment	Vernon Dahlart		
1984	Romancing the Stone	Ralph		
1984	Johnny Dangerously	Burr		
1985	The Jewel of the Nile	Ralph		
1985	Head Office	Frank Steadman		
1986	Wise Guys	Harry Valentini		
1986	Ruthless People	Sam Stone		
1986	My Little Pony: The Movie	Grundle King	Voice	
1987	Tin Men	Ernest Tilley		
1987	Throw Momma from the Train	Owen Lift	Also director	
1988	Twins	Vincent Benedict		
1989	The War of the Roses	Gavin D'Amato	Also director	
1991	Other People's Money	Larry Garfield		
1992	Batman Returns	Oswald Cobblepot / The Penguin		
1992	Hoffa	Bobby Ciaro	Also director and producer	
1993	Jack the Bear	John Leary		
1993	Last Action Hero	Whiskers	Uncredited voice	
1993	Look Who's Talking Now	Rocks	Voice	
1994	Renaissance Man	Bill Rago		
1994	Junior	Dr. Larry Arbogast		
1995	Get Shorty	Martin Weir	Also producer	
1996	Matilda	Harry Wormwood / Narrator	Also director and producer	
1996	Space Jam	Swackhammer	Voice	
1996	Mars Attacks!	Rude Gambler		
1997	The Rainmaker	Deck Shifflet		
1997	Hercules	Philoctetes	Voice	
1997	L.A. Confidential	Sid Hudgens		
1997	Men in Black	Alien on TV Monitor	Uncredited cameo	
1998	Living Out Loud	Pat Francato	Also producer	
1999	The Big Kahuna	Phil Cooper		
1999	Man on the Moon	George Shapiro	Also producer	
1999	The Virgin Suicides	Dr. Hornicker		
2000	Drowning Mona	Wyatt Rash	Also producer	
2000	Screwed	Grover Cleaver		
2001	Heist	Bergman		
2001	What's the Worst That Could Happen?	Max Fairbanks		
2002	Death to Smoochy	Burke Bennet	Also director	
2002	Austin Powers in Goldmember	Himself as Mini-Me		
2003	Anything Else	Harvey Wexler		
2003	Duplex	Narrator	Uncredited voice; also director	
2003	Big Fish	Amos Calloway		
2004	Christmas in Love	Brad LaGuardia		
2005	Be Cool	Martin Weir	Also producer	
2005	Marilyn Hotchkiss' Ballroom Dancing and Charm School	Booth		
2006	Relative Strangers	Frank Menure	Also producer	
2006	Even Money	Walter	Also producer	
2006	10 Items or Less	'Big D'		
2006	The Oh in Ohio	Wayne		
2006	Deck the Halls	Buddy Hall		
2007	The Good Night	Mel		
2007	Reno 911!: Miami	District Attorney	Also producer	
2007	Nobel Son	Gastner		
2008	Just Add Water	Merl Stryker		
2009	House Broken	Tom 'Smokey' Cathkart		
2009	Solitary Man	Jimmy		
2010	When in Rome	Al		
2011	Girl Walks into a Bar	Aldo		
2011	Revenge of the Electric Car	Himself	Documentary	
2012	The Lorax	The Lorax	Voice (multilanguage voice-over)	
2012	Hotel Noir	Eugene Portland		
2014	All the Wilderness	Dr. Pembry		
2016	Curmudgeons	Jackie	Short film; also director and producer	
2016	Wiener-Dog	Dave Schmerz		
2016	The Comedian	Jimmy Berkowitz		
2017	Animal Crackers	Chesterfield	Voice	
2018	Smallfoot	Dorgle	Voice	
2019	Dumbo	Max Medici		
2019	Jumanji: The Next Level	Eddie Gilpin		
2020	The One and Only Ivan	Bob	Voice	
2021	The Survivor	Charlie Goldman		
2023	Haunted Mansion	Bruce		
2023	Poolman	Jack		
2023	Migration	Uncle Dan	Voice	
2024	Beetlejuice Beetlejuice	Janitor		
2024	A Sudden Case of Christmas	Lawrence		
2026	Jumanji: Open World	Eddie Gilpin	Post-production	

=== Television ===
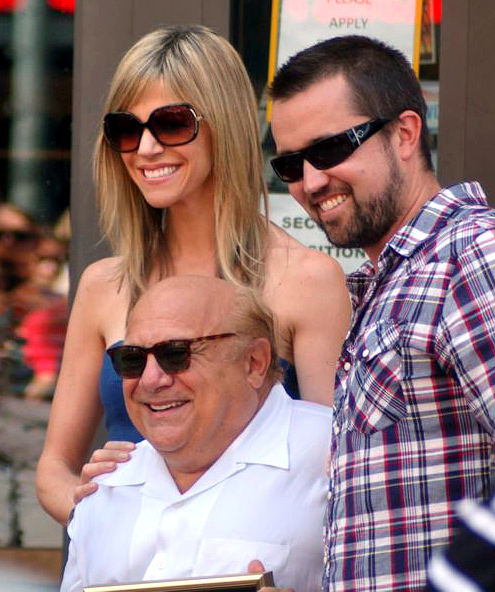
DeVito with It's Always Sunny in Philadelphia cast mates Kaitlin Olson and Rob McElhenney at the ceremony for DeVito to receive a star on the Hollywood Walk of Fame on August 18, 2011

Year	Title	Role	Notes	Refs.
1977	Delvecchio	Anthony 'Beanzie' Marott	Episode: "Requiem For A Loser"	
1977	Starsky & Hutch	John 'John-John The Apple' DeAppoliso	Episode: "The Collector"	
1977	Police Woman	Napoleon	Episode: "Death Game"	
1977	All That Glitters	Baba	10 episodes	
1978–1983	Taxi	Louie De Palma	114 episodes	
1979	Angie	Uncle Cheech	Episode: "Uncle Cheech"	
1980	The Associates	Alan Swathmore	Episode: "The Out of Town Trip"	
1982	The Selling of Vince D'Angelo	Vince D'Angelo	Short film; also director	
1982–1999	Saturday Night Live	Himself (host)	6 episodes	
1984	The Ratings Game	Vic De Salvo	Television film; also director	
1984	CBS Schoolbreak Special	Ackroyd	Episode: "All the Kids Do It"	
1985	Amazing Stories	Herbert	Episode: "The Wedding Ring"	
1986	Molly and the Skywalkerz: Happily Ever After	George Johnson	Voice; television special	
1988	Sesame Street	Vincent van Trash	Episode: "2504"	
1989	Molly and the Skywalkerz: Two Daddies?	George Johnson	Voice; television special	
1990	The Earth Day Special	Vic	Television special	
1991–present	The Simpsons	Herb Powell	Voice; 4 episodes	
1994	The Larry Sanders Show	Himself	Episode: "The Gift Episode"	
1997	Pearl	Dean Martin	Episode: "Dean Cuisine"	
2002	Ed	Dr. Jack Carmichael	Episode: "Human Nature"	
2003	Karen Sisco	Charlie Lucre	2 episodes	
2004	Friends	Officer Roy Goodbody	Episode: "The One Where the Stripper Cries"	
2004	Father of the Pride	Emerson	Voice; episode: "And the Revolution Continues"	
2006–present	It's Always Sunny in Philadelphia	Frank Reynolds	169 episodes	
2015	Deadbeat	Giuseppe Monamocce	Episode: "The Occult Leader"	
2018	The Kominsky Method	Dr. Wexler	2 episodes	
2021	Last Week Tonight with John Oliver	Himself/Chemist	Episode: "Chemicals"	
2022	Little Demon	Satan	Voice; 10 episodes; also executive producer	
2022	Storybots: Answer Time	Giuseppe	Episode: "Multiplication"	
2023	Big City Greens	Merv Stampington	Voice; episode: "Long Goodbye"	
2025	Abbott Elementary	Frank Reynolds	Crossover episode: "Volunteers"	
2025	Rick and Morty	Dr. Dogballs	Voice; episode: "The CuRicksous Case of Bethjamin Button"	

=== Video games ===
Year	Title	Voice role	Refs.
1997	Disney's Animated Storybook: Hercules	Philoctetes	
1997	Disney's Hercules	Philoctetes	

=== Theatre ===
Year	Title	Role	Notes	Refs.
1969	Shoot Anything With Hair That Moves	Frank	Off-Broadway	
1969	The Man with the Flower in His Mouth	Friend Pe' (Jar), Marranca	Off-Broadway	
1971	One Flew Over the Cuckoo's Nest	Anthony Martini	Off-Broadway	
1973	A Phantasmoria Historia of D. Johann Fausten Magister	Performer	Off-Broadway	
1974	The Merry Wives of Windsor	John Rugby	Off-Broadway	
1975	The Comedy of Errors	Balthazar, Solinus	Understudy/Off-Broadway	
2012–2-13	The Sunshine Boys	Willie Clark	Savoy Theatre; Ahmanson Theatre	
2017	The Price	Gregory Solomon	American Airlines Theatre	
2023	I Need That	Sam	American Airlines Theatre	

=== Music videos ===
Year	Title	Artist	Refs.
1984	"Ghostbusters"	Ray Parker Jr.	
1986	"When the Going Gets Tough, the Tough Get Going"	Billy Ocean	
1997	"Wear My Hat"	Phil Collins	
1998	"Victory"	Puff Daddy featuring The Notorious B.I.G. & Busta Rhymes	
2006	"Mojo"	Peeping Tom featuring Rahzel & Dan the Automator	
2014	"Steal My Girl"	One Direction	

== As director and producer ==
Year	Title	Director	Producer	Notes	Refs.
1973	The Sound Sleeper	Yes	Yes	Short film	
1975	Minestrone	Yes	Yes	Short film	
1982	The Selling of Vince D'Angelo	Yes	No	Short film, created for Likely Stories	
1984	The Ratings Game	Yes	No	Television film	
1985	A Lovely Way to Spend an Evening	Yes	No	Short film, created for Likely Stories	
1987	Throw Momma from the Train	Yes	No		
1989	The War of the Roses	Yes	No		
1992	Hoffa	Yes	Yes		
1994	Reality Bites	No	Yes		
1994	8 Seconds	No	Yes		
1994	Pulp Fiction	No	Executive		
1995	Get Shorty	No	Yes		
1996	Matilda	Yes	Yes		
1996	Sunset Park	No	Yes		
1996	Feeling Minnesota	No	Yes		
1997	Gattaca	No	Yes		
1998	Out of Sight	No	Yes		
1998	Living Out Loud	No	Yes		
1999	Man on the Moon	No	Yes		
2000	Erin Brockovich	No	Yes		
2000	Drowning Mona	No	Executive		
2001	How High	No	Yes		
2002	Death to Smoochy	Yes	No		
2003	Camp	No	Yes		
2003	Duplex	Yes	No		
2004	Along Came Polly	No	Yes		
2004	Garden State	No	Executive		
2005	Be Cool	No	Yes		
2005	Queen B	Yes	No	Television pilot	
2006	Even Money	No	Yes		
2006	Relative Strangers	No	Yes		
2007	Freedom Writers	No	Yes		
2007	Reno 911!: Miami	No	Yes		
2012	St. Sebastian	Yes	Yes	Unreleased	
2014	A Walk Among the Tombstones	No	Yes		
2016	Curmudgeons	Yes	Yes	Short film	
2022	Little Demon	No	Executive	Television series	
2026	Drag	No	Yes		
