= McWade =

McWade is a surname. Notable people with the surname include:

- Charlie McWade (born 1974), American actor
- Edward McWade (1865–1943), American actor and screenwriter
- Margaret McWade (1871–1956), American actress, wife of Edward
- Robert McWade (1872–1938), American actor
