= Lucy DeVito =

American actress (born 1983)

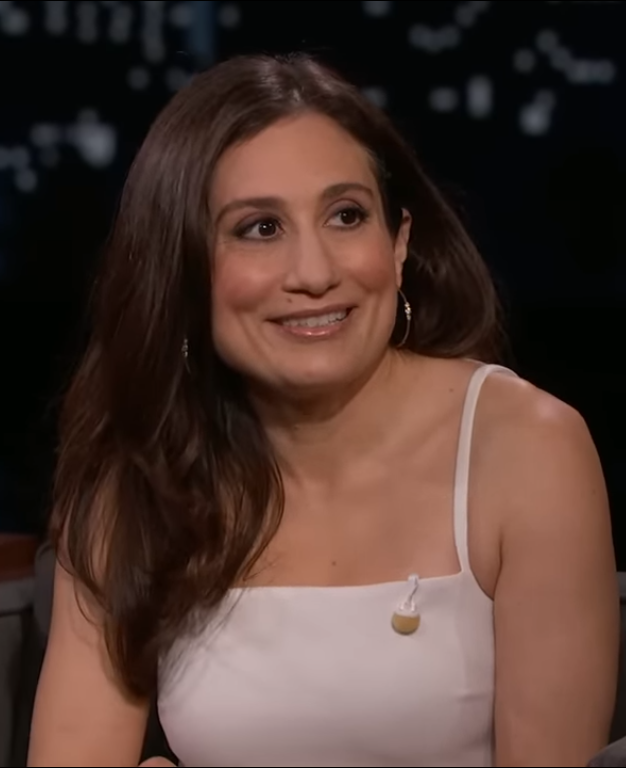
- DeVito in 2023
- Born: Lucy Chet DeVito; March 11, 1983 (age 43); Los Angeles, California, U.S.
- Education: Brown University
- Occupations: Actress; philanthropist
- Years active: 2005–present
- Children: 1
- Parents: Danny DeVito (father); Rhea Perlman (mother)
- Relatives: Philip Perlman (maternal grandfather); Heide Perlman (aunt)

Lucy Chet DeVito (born March 11, 1983) is an American actress. She played a recurring character on ABC Family's Melissa & Joey (2010–2012), starred in the Hulu sitcom Deadbeat (2014–2015), and was a main voice actor and executive producer of the FXX animated comedy Little Demon (2022). DeVito has appeared in a number of theater productions, including her Broadway debut I Need That (2023). Since 2007, she has been a member of the New York developmental theater company Ensemble Studio Theater.

== Early life ==
DeVito was born Lucy Chet DeVito on March 11, 1983, in Los Angeles, California, the daughter of actors Danny DeVito and Rhea Perlman. She also has two younger siblings, a sister, Grace Fan DeVito, and a brother Jacob Daniel DeVito. Her father is Catholic and her mother is Jewish.

She graduated from Brown University in 2007 with a degree in theater.

== Career ==
In 2007, DeVito starred as the non-speaking autistic title character in the play Lucy at the Ensemble Studio Theater.

In 2008, she starred as Anne Frank in a production of Anne Frank at the Intiman Theatre in Seattle, Washington.

In 2009, DeVito starred as La Piccola in the play The Miracle at Naples at the Huntington Theatre.

Her first major movie role was the 2009 film Leaves of Grass; later that year DeVito starred alongside her mother in the off-Broadway play Love, Loss, and What I Wore, adapted by Nora and Delia Ephron, at the Westside Theatre.

She portrayed the daughter of Danny DeVito's character in the 2016 film The Comedian.

In 2016, DeVito performed the role of Annelle Dupuy-Desoto in Steel Magnolias at the Bucks County Playhouse in New Hope, Pennsylvania. This production was directed by Marsha Mason, and also starred Patricia Richardson, Elaine Hendrix, Jessica Walter and Susan Sullivan. On June 9, 2016, this production became the highest-grossing show in the history of the Bucks County Playhouse.

In 2017, she portrayed Elanor in the play Hot Mess, a romantic comedy.

== Personal life ==
On April 23, 2024, DeVito announced on Instagram that she was pregnant with her first child. On July 2024, she gave birth to her son.

== Filmography ==
=== Film ===
Year	Title	Role	Notes
2005	This Revolution		Uncredited
2007	The Good Night		Uncredited
2007	Nobel Son	Wanda	
2008	Just Add Water	Wanda	
2008	A Quiet Little Marriage	Sylvia	
2009	Leaves of Grass	Miss Greenstein	
2010	Beware the Gonzo	Marlene	
2012	Sleepwalk with Me	Hilary	
2013	Syrup	Cindy	
2016	Curmudgeons	Robin	
2016	The Comedian	Brittany Berkowitz	
2017	Speech & Debate	Lucy	
2018	Can You Ever Forgive Me?	Gossipy Office Worker	
2019	Dumbo	Coat check girl	
2019	Cubby	Alexis	
2019	Jumanji: The Next Level	Maiden	
2021	Marvelous and the Black Hole	Annabelle	
2022	Blonde	Ex-Athlete's Niece	
2022	Menorah in the Middle	Sarah Becker	
2023	The Secret Art of Human Flight	Gloria	
2023	The List	Patty	
2024	A Sudden Case of Christmas	Mother	
2026	Drag	TBA	Also producer

=== Television ===
Year	Title	Role	Notes
2006	Crumbs	Cashier	Episode: "A Loon Again, Naturally"
2006–2007	It's Always Sunny in Philadelphia	Jenny/Woman	3 episodes
2007	Dirt	Linda	Episode: "Caught on Tape"
2010–2012	Melissa & Joey	Stephanie Krause	15 episodes
2014	Alpha House	Charity Robeson	4 episodes
2014–2015	Deadbeat	Sue	20 episodes
2015	Girls	Lisa	Episode: "Iowa"
2016	A Cinderella Christmas	Lara	TV movie
2018–2019	The Marvelous Mrs. Maisel	Irene	2 episodes
2019	Shameless	Yolanda	Episode: "Lost"
2022	Little Demon	Chrissy Feinberg (voice)	10 episodes; also executive producer

=== Theater ===
Selected credits, adapted from About the Artists
Year	Title	Role	Venue	Notes
2007	Lucy	Lucy	Ensemble Studio Theatre	Off-off-Broadway
2008	The Diary of Anne Frank	Anne Frank	Intiman Playhouse	Regional
2009	The Miracle as Naples	La Piccola	Huntington Theatre Company	Regional
2009–10	Love, Loss, and What I Wore		Westside Theatre	Off-Broadway
2010	Love, Loss, and What I Wore		Skirball Center	Los Angeles transfer
2011	The Shoemaker		Acorn Theatre	Off-Broadway
2013	The Electric Baby	Rozie	Two River Theater	Regional
2013	Make It Snappier!	Linda	The 52nd Street Project	Off-Broadway
2013	Any Given Monday	Sarah	Delaware Theatre Company	Regional
2016	In Quietness	Beth	Soho Repertory Theatre	Off-off-Broadway
2016	Steel Magnolias	Annelle	Bucks County Playhouse	Regional
2017	Hot Mess	Elanor	The Theatre Center	Off-Broadway
2023	I Need That	Amelia	American Airlines Theatre	Broadway
