= List of Deadbeat episodes =

Deadbeat is an American supernatural comedy series created by Cody Heller and Brett Konner about medium Kevin Pacalioglu, played by Tyler Labine, and was first released on Hulu on April 9, 2014. On April 30, 2014, the series was renewed for a second season of 13 episodes. On May 26, 2015 the series was renewed for a third season of 13 episodes. As it did the previous year, the season premiered on April 20 (4/20) - a marijuana reference that's not uncommon throughout the series.

== Series overview ==
Season	Episodes	Release date
1	10	April 9, 2014
2	13	April 20, 2015
3	13	April 20, 2016

== Episodes ==
=== Season 1 (2014) ===
No. overall	No. in season	Title	Directed by	Written by	Original release date
1	1	"The Sexorcism"	Troy Miller	Cody Heller & Brett Konner	April 9, 2014
Daniel, a ghost who served in the army in WWII is haunting the attic of the house where his girlfriend once lived. Daniel died a virgin, and wants to have sex with his girlfriend Angela before he moves on. Kevin must convince Angela, now an old woman, to have sex with him, while Daniel possesses Kevin's body. Meanwhile, Kevin sees Camomile White, a woman who is a writer and claims to be a medium, but finds out she is a fraud. At a bookstore, Camomile White claims that the owner's grandfather died trying to save the bookstore from a fire, but Kevin reveals that the grandfather died starting the fire. Camomile is able to make a distraction, but later meets Kevin and attacks him, resulting in Kevin vomiting on her clothes.
2	2	"The Hot God Contest"	Troy Miller	Cody Heller & Brett Konner	April 9, 2014
Hiro Tamagachi, a professional Hot Dog eater, is haunting a hospital. Before he died, he was training for the Hot Dog Invitational competition. When he died, his stomach was donated to Menachem, who is Jewish, and can't eat the hot dogs, because they're pork hot dogs. Kevin must convince Menachem to enter the competition and beat Johnny Praline, Hiro's rival. At the competition, the winner turns out to be Kevin, who was eating hot dogs on the side due to nervousness. Menachem gets angry at Kevin, because he went against his religion for nothing. Hiro, however, was amazed at Kevin's skill, and says that it was never about him winning, but rather Johnny losing. Hiro thanks Kevin, and goes into his light. Meanwhile, Sue, Camomile's assistant, comes to Kevin's house to give him the dry-cleaning bill of 25 dollars for Camomile's pantsuit, which Kevin vomited on. Roofie finds out that Camomile is coming to an art museum for a séance for Vesuvius, a man who literally put himself in his artwork. After the séance, Kevin comes to Camomile with a traveler's check of 25 dollars (the amount he received for helping Hiro), and tells Camomile that Vesuvius wanted his final artwork to be hung right-side-up. After Kevin leaves, Camomile asks the people of the museum fix Vesuvius's artwork. When Vesuvius sees this, he goes to his light, causing a lightbulb to break, surprising Camomile and Sue.
3	3	"The Knockoff"	Troy Miller	David Baldy, Cody Heller & Brett Konner	April 9, 2014
Kevin owes Roofie money, so in order to pay him back, Kevin runs Roofie's newsstand for the day. While at the newsstand, a guy named Gucci Man comes to Kevin, asking for his help with a haunted blanket. The ghost in the blanket is nicknamed Shaky Hands (Godfrey), who went to movie theaters to record movies, then would sell them as DVDs on Bootlegger Row, but his hands shook a lot while holding the camera, giving him the nickname. Before he died, Shaky recorded a video without the camera shaking, which also recorded a murder in front of him. Shaky wants Kevin to show the video to Gucci Man so that he will be respected, and will no longer have that nickname. After finding the video, the Swedish Mafia, who committed the murder in the video, kidnap Kevin. Kevin, fearing for his life, explains that he is a medium, and proves it by telling that the boss of the Swedish Mafia (Darrell Hammond), who is a ghost, was gay. Then, in front of the Swedish Mafia, the boss goes into his light. The Swedish Mafia then get Kevin to dig his own grave, to prevent Kevin from using the information of the Swedish Mafia's victims against them. Shaky Hands brings Gucci Man to help Kevin, where 3 of the four Mafia members are agents, and Shaky Hands killing the last one, who held Kevin hostage. The agents, who killed the man in the theater, decide it is best to destroy the tape. This causes Kevin to be sad, because now Shaky Hands will never be respected and go into the light. Gucci Man tells Kevin that he gave Shaky Hands that nickname out of respect for him. Shaky Hands, who hears this, goes to his light. After his adventure, Kevin comes back to the newsstand, with everything gone. Roofie comes back, explaining that he cleared out everything, and also that surprisingly, the newsstand made money while Kevin was gone. Kevin gives Roofie a genuine Gucci bag to pay Roofie back, which Roofie accepts. Kevin then continues to run the newsstand, but also uses it for his medium business.
4	4	"The Comedium"	Troy Miller	Cody Heller, Brett Konner & Monica Padrick	April 9, 2014
Kevin's business is working smoothly with the newsstand helping to draw more business. He is approached by a comedy club owner, Darcy (Samantha Bee), who wants help with a haunting at her club. Upon confronting the ghost, a dead comedian named Buddy Silver (Jason Kravits), he finds that the ghost doesn't want to leave since he enjoys performing for other ghosts. To get rid of the stubborn comedian, Roofie suggests providing him with a terrible audience so that he will go into the light. Kevin shows up to Buddy Silver's next show with a group of women who died on the way to a bachelorette party. The women, who are more interested in a strip show, ruin Buddy Silver's performance, and he disappears. However, now the comedy club is haunted by a bachelorette party that demands a stripper. Kevin provides them with a male stripper, but the stripper misinterprets the situation and dances for Kevin instead. When he tries to explain the situation, the stripper runs away, believing that Kevin is a murderer. The frustrated bachelorette party refuses to leave until they see some actual nudity, and Kevin ends up exposing himself to them, allowing the women to disappear into the light. However, upon the disappearance of the bachelorette party, Buddy Silver returns. Kevin talks with the ghost who reveals that the reason he has not passed on is because he has forgotten how much he loved his wife, due to his stand-up routine revolving around jokes about his spouse. Once Buddy Silver realizes this, he gives a brief sentimental performance about the love he has for his wife, and he disappears. Meanwhile, Camomile White confronts Kevin, worried about his knowledge that she is faking her psychic powers. She attempts to seduce him and records Kevin saying that he has never actually seen a ghost. She uploads the recording to her computer, intending to discredit Kevin.
5	5	"Out-Of-Body Issues"	Troy Miller	Cody Heller & Brett Konner	April 9, 2014
Kevin and Roofie are approached by a model (Aja Naomi King) who works for the United States of Apparel, claiming that the clothing store is haunted. They go to the store where Kevin finds Alice (Justine Lupe), a dead model haunting the store because the owner, Reed Kelly (Jason Biggs) refused to use her photos in the store. Kevin goes to the owner who agrees to publish the photos, but Alice is unsatisfied with the pictures taken by Reed Kelly, believing that she looks fat and gross in them. She asks Kevin to dig up her dead body and take better photos of her. Roofie and Kevin go to the graveyard, dig her up, and take some photos, but Alice is still unhappy since the pictures are unusable since she is not wearing clothing from the store. She demands that they dig her up again and give her a makeover. Kevin and Roofie give her dead body a makeover and take other pictures, satisfying Alice and allowing her to go into the light. However, when the model that hired them sees that Alice's pictures have replaced her own, she refuses to pay them, and Roofie and Kevin are forced to leave empty handed.
6	6	"Raising the Dead"	Troy Miller	David Baldy, Cody Heller & Brett Konner	April 9, 2014
25 years ago, on Halloween, Kevin and a child at an orphanage use a mirror in a basement, and say "Bloody Mary" 3 times. While the other kid doesn't see anything, Kevin sees the ghost of Bloody Mary (Brooke Lyons), and talks to her. Since then, every Halloween, Kevin talked to Mary via a mirror. In the present, Kevin and Roofie go to a restaurant, and Roofie orders a Bloody Mary for him, Kevin, and the hungover waitress. Because Roofie says "Bloody Mary" 3 times, Kevin sees Mary in a mirror, and they catch up. Kevin, ever since he was a child, had a crush on Mary, and decides to see if he can get the mirror from the orphanage from when he first met Mary. Kevin goes to the orphanage and talks to Sister Brothers, who will give the mirror to Kevin if he can get rid of a ghost haunting the orphanage. The ghost is an orphaned child named Amber (Ashley Gerasimovich), who doesn't communicate verbally, who had scars on her palms, and tries to hurt the children in horrible and indescribable ways. Kevin takes Amber to his apartment, trying to solve her problem, but he doesn't know what she wants. Kevin, who turns away for a minute, sees Amber is missing, along with his knife/lighter and a picture of Camomile from a magazine. Meanwhile, Camomile White, who is on a talk show again, predicts that the New York parade will be fine, while a caller, who claims to be a clairvoyant, says that she saw people on fire at the parade. Camomile and Sue decide to go to the parade to make sure that no one gets on fire. At the parade, Amber is following Camomile with the knife, but Kevin stops her before she can stab Camomile so she can be a ghost to be her mother. After Camomile sees that Kevin's knife is a lighter, she believes that he was the one who made the call about a possible fire, but Sue claims that she did it, so that Camomile would take her to the parade. Just before midnight, Kevin talks to Mary about the two of them dating, but Mary tells Kevin that she saw Kevin as a child who needed a mother, and Mary wanted to be that mother. Kevin feels disappointed, then notices that Amber has a paper. The paper shows the cutout of Camomile, with Amber, showing that Amber wanted Camomile as a mother. Kevin brings Amber to Mary, who decides to take care of Amber. The next day, Kevin talks to Roofie, saying that he will continue to try to chase Camomile.
7	7	"Calamityville Horror"	Troy Miller	Cody Heller & Brett Konner	April 9, 2014
Roofie buys a teardown online for a cheap price, and brings Kevin along. Roofie plans on sprucing up the house and selling it back on the market for a high price. Kevin goes with Roofie to see if he can scavenge anything from the house. However, Kevin and Roofie soon learn that the house is haunted. Kevin finds out that the previous owners of the house were a couple named Jack (Ethan Phillips) and Julep (Mary Testa), who died arguing about what color to paint the kitchen. Julep poisoned Jack's drink, and Jack found out, and stabbed her 47 times, and Julep pushed him down the stairs, breaking his neck. Kevin, who acts as a counselor for them, find out that the only reason they stayed together for so long was Brianna (Halley Feiffer), their 30-year-old daughter. Brianna was a shy girl who liked to play with her dolls, and when she saw her parents dead, she called the police, and unknowingly drank the poison. While Kevin is acting as a counselor, Roofie is trying to use a screwdriver to open the door, but fails, and gets molested by the ghost of Brianna. Kevin, who hears Roofie moaning, goes to find Brianna holding a screwdriver towards Roofie, planning on killing him to make him her husband. Kevin and Roofie then help the ghosts pass on by suggesting they get a divorce, saying that while it was uncommon 30 years ago, it is a common thing today. The two get a divorce, allowing the couple to go into the light. Kevin then tells Brianna that a 30-year-old girl who is unmarried is also common today, allowing Brianna to go to the light as well.
8	8	"The Ghost in the Machine"	Troy Miller	Cody Heller & Brett Konner	April 9, 2014
Jeremy Goldberg, a businessman, asks Kevin to check on a haunted apartment that was rented by Jeremy's father. Kevin finds out that the apartment is inhabited by the ghost of Jeremy's grandfather, Rube Goldberg, inventor of Rube Goldberg machines, who rented the apartment under Jeremy's dad's name and has been dead for 40 years. Rube Goldberg plans on making the most elaborate Rube Goldberg machine of all time, and promises Kevin $10,000, in exchange for three unique parts required for the machine. Kevin is interested in the money, to show to Camomile White that he's not a loser. After a series of elaborate plots to steal the unique parts, Kevin learns that Rube Goldberg didn't really need them for the machine, as his goal is actually to bring together his family, that he had neglected all his life. When the machine is put into motion, it causes a chain of convoluted and highly improbable events, that ultimately bring Jeremy and a long lost cousin in the same hospital room and allow Roofie to have a conversation with the New York mayor, who offers $10,000 in exchange for taking care of a haunted subway tunnel.
9	9	"Sixty Feet Under"	Troy Miller	Cody Heller & Brett Konner	April 9, 2014
The Mayor of New York City (Ray Wise) offers Kevin a career-making case, for $10,000 if he can remove the haunting of the subway. On site, Kevin meets Mikey O'shmidt (Domenick Lombardozzi) who appears to be caught in an infinite loop of ghost denial, making him the most difficult case that Kevin has ever faced. While drinking at a bar to solve this problem, Kevin encounters Sue and the two talking their situation. After giving Kevin idea to distract Mikey from his loop by having a pretty woman during his conversations, Kevin and Sue drink until they're "more drunk than they've ever been." Kevin returns to the tunnel and waits for Sue only to find Camomile vying for his position. Kevin convinces the Mayor to Jockey for the Tunnel job result in a televised exorcise stand-off. Just when Kevin is about to convince them of his legit medium abilities, a wall mysteriously breaks. Camomile exposes that is in fact a trick (that she set up) and blames Kevin as a fake medium. Afterwards, she humiliates him by making Sue playback his previous recording from some days ago, denouncing his abilities as a medium. She convinces everyone to help her exorcise the ghost, only to have Mikey coincidentally, but not before realize what caused his death. Mikey goes into his light, causing the lights at the workers' feet to break. Kevin is humiliated and discredited, so no one believes his warnings that Mikey was killed by another angry ghost who haunts the construction site. After everyone has left the construction site, Camomile and Sue go back to remove the tricks Camomile had set up (like the brick wall). While complimenting Sue on the breaking lights, Sue reveals that the lights weren't prepared to break, and Sue gets killed in the subway by the mystery ghost.
10	10	"Pieces of Sue"	Troy Miller	Cody Heller & Brett Konner	April 9, 2014
After being humiliated by Camomile, Kevin decides to quit the medium business and find some other non-ghost related employment. After a long and unsuccessful search, Kevin returns to his apartment to find the ghost of Sue (having been killed by the angry ghost from the tunnels). Reluctantly Kevin agrees to help ghost Sue as his last medium job by gathering Sue's remains for burial at sea. After gathering Sue's body parts, and a close encounter with the angry ghost, Sue and Kevin make it the water, only to discover that they left the bag in the taxi they took. Kevin retrieves the bag, only to have Camomile black-mail Kevin with a video of him gathering Sue's remains. She will frame him for murder if he doesn't make sure the tunnel is safe. Kevin and Sue return to tunnel to find Daniel L. Turner (Todd Barry), who wanted credit for designing the Second Avenue Subway, and said credit for the design had been stolen by Earl Greystone. So Sue suggests "rewriting history" by editing a page on Wikipedia to give Turner credit. With the help of Roofie, Turner goes into the light. Despite Kevin's objections, Roofie creates a wiki page for Kevin giving him partial credit for the Tunnel job. Camomile tries to exact revenge, but finds the video has mysteriously been destroyed. Sue's remains are scattered into the ocean, but she is unable to move on. Kevin invites her to stay with him until she finds out how to go into the light, but he secretly keeps one of her fingers to himself.

=== Season 2 (2015) ===
No. overall	No. in season	Title	Directed by	Written by	Original release date
11	1	"The Ex-orcism"	Todd Biermann	Cody Heller & Brett Konner	April 20, 2015
Kevin explains to Roofie his predicament with Sue, and gives Roofie Sue's finger for safekeeping. While trying to "help" Sue find what is causing her to stay, Sue reveals she had an ex-boyfriend named Glen. At one point, they were supposed to have a date together, but Glen never showed up. Kevin goes to Glen, who reveals that he was getting ready to meet Sue, but got injured and lost her contact information as a result of a car accident. Sue suggests that they go on a date the next day, and Glen accepts. Kevin talks to Roofie, and Roofie tells Kevin that Kevin can control it, as Kevin is the only way for Glen to talk to Sue. Soon after, Glen comes to Kevin's stand, saying he died by slipping in a puddle in his bathroom. Glen decides to continue on his date without Kevin. Before he leaves, Glen says that his only regret is not being able to get his maid a Green Card by marrying her. Kevin then goes to the maid, and they get a marriage certificate. While getting the certificate, Glen meets Sue as a ghost, but almost immediately after seeing each other, Glen goes into the light. Kevin goes to meet Sue at the intended date spot, where Sue tells him about Glen, and she assumes that Glen's unfinished business was meeting her. Sue decides that she won't worry about getting into the light, and decides to live in the moment. Meanwhile, Camomile is working on a reality TV series, trying to convince a woman that her dead husband is at peace. However, the house seems haunted as plates keep breaking for no reason. Camomile tries to persuade Kevin to help her, by offering a job, but Kevin refuses. She then asks her boyfriend to shadow him, and he does, claiming that Kevin kept saying "Sue." Camomile then looks through Sue's files, finding photo-booth photos from when Kevin was drunk with Sue.
12	2	"Table for Sue"	Todd Biermann	David Baldy	April 20, 2015
As Kevin prepares to go on his first date with Sue, a restaurateur asks his assistance to rid the spirit of a former chef. The chef is found to be unable to move on because a reviewer didn't like one of his special meals. Kevin agrees to persuade the reviewer to retry and hopefully give a better comment.
13	3	"Ghosts Just Wanna Have Fun"	Todd Biermann	Dan Lagana	April 20, 2015
As Camomile blackmails Kevin into being a bodyguard against ghosts on her psychic television programme, a teenage ghost refuses to move on because she is so bored at being dead. Kevin, Roofie, and the ghost partake in marijuana and watch videos online to pass the time, until the ghost announces she is throwing a party on set of Camomile's next shoot. Meanwhile, Sue befriends a female spirit named Millie who died in 1911 in the Triangle Shirtwaist Factory fire who picks on innocent men with pranks.
14	4	"Last Dance with Edith Jane"	Todd Biermann	Debbie Jhoon & J. Michael Feldman	April 20, 2015
Pac helps a 1940s Broadway dancer train for a nursing home talent show
15	5	"The Occult Leader"	Heath Cullens	Charlie Saunders	April 20, 2015
Pac becomes the reluctant cult leader of a group en route to Pluto
16	6	"Good Will Haunting"	Heath Cullens	Jordan Shipley & Justin Shipley	April 20, 2015
Pac takes a job at a school in order to help the ghost of a janitor
17	7	"The Blowfish Job"	Heath Cullens	Cody Heller & Brett Konner	April 20, 2015
Pac's adoptive father TJ shows up in need of Pac's help exorcising his new apartment
18	8	"The Spank Job"	Heath Cullens	Debbie Jhoon & J. Michael Feldman	April 20, 2015
Pac attempts to return a TV he cannot afford, the salesman offers a refund if he can exorcise the store. Pac learns that the spirit is a young man who believed in Y2K and took his girlfriend to an underground bunker where he later died. The ghost tells Pac that the food supply is about run out for his ex-girlfriend, so Pac assembles Roofie and his friend to help save the girl's life. Meanwhile, Cammommile's career is on the line after it is revealed that Sarah (the girl who was underground that Pac saved) actually didn't die as Cammomille told Sarah's mother ten years earlier who later committed suicide.
19	9	"The Emancipation Apparition"	Heath Cullens	Jordan Shipley & Justin Shipley	April 20, 2015
Kevin and Sue's plan of a vacation is ruined by the ghost of President Abraham Lincoln whose only uncompleted wish is not seeing the rest of the play after his assassination
20	10	"The Unholy Trinity"	Todd Biermann	David Baldy	April 20, 2015
With their relationship strained due to no physical contact Sue and Kevin hire a "sex vessel", but their perfect candidate only has one deal - to exorcise her apartment. Kevin is less confident about this particular exorcism, due to the fact the ghost is a former priest who didn't properly baptize her as baby and a result has become a satanist.
21	11	"The Polaroid Flasher"	Todd Biermann	Dan Lagana	April 20, 2015
Roofie, arrested for drug dealing, needs Pac's help from prison to obtain a specific bag of weed
22	12	"The Ghost of Christmas Presents"	Todd Biermann	Cody Heller & Brett Konner	April 20, 2015
Kevin helps the ghost of a "Santa" who wants to deliver his last present, Kevin soon discovers that the ghost was a part of a fraternity of Santas. The Santa to which he is helping, accuses one of the fellow Santas of re gifting his gift. Meanwhile, Sue and Millie attend a party, it becomes apparent that Sue is depressed that she and Kevin cannot have a physical relationship. But after helping the ghost of "Santa", Kevin is given a chocolate bar that enables a spirit to go inside a living being. He uses so he and Sue can finally have sex.
23	13	"Finger F**ked"	Heath Cullens	Cody Heller & Brett Konner	April 20, 2015
Camomile is being possessed by Millie, Sue's friend who had died in the factory fire, and Camomile soon decides once again to blackmail Kevin - by threatening to return Sue's finger to the water. The US government is investigating Kevin and Zowlia's illegal marriage, Zowlia suddenly falls into a coma due to liver failure, entrapping Sue. As Kevin confronts Camomile, Millie prevents Kevin being shot by Camomile and shoots Camomile in the heart and falls into the East River taking the ghost of Millie with her. Kevin, out of guilt reveals to Sue about her finger and tells her he loves her and Sue tells her she loves him too, and she is happy and she moves on into the light and leaves Kevin heartbroken.

=== Season 3 (2016) ===
No. overall	No. in season	Title	Directed by	Written by	Original release date
24	1	"El Caboose"	Adam Nix & Evan Nix	Dan Lagana	April 20, 2016
Following the death of Camomile White and Sue disappearing into the afterlife, Kevin has gone into hiding at a massage parlor where he works clean-up. During his usual routine, he notices Tyson, Roofie's drug-dealing friend, getting a massage. He speaks with him and is told that Roofie took the fall for Camomile's death, so there is no reason for Kevin to be in hiding. Instead of going to jail, Roofie had fled to South America. However, upon his arrival, he died in a freak accident when a woman sat on his face while they were on the dance floor. No longer needing to continue work at the massage parlor, Kevin takes a job from a ghost named Manny (Efren Ramirez) to complete a drug deal that he was unable to complete when he died. Kevin goes to the morgue to retrieve the package, five heroin balloons, but is informed that the drugs are still inside Manny's ass. Kevin retrieves the drugs but is caught in the process by the necrophiliac coroner (Lauren Adams) who misinterprets the situation and has Kevin thrown in jail. Once in jail, Kevin meets Clyde (Kal Penn) who had been arrested for smoking weed at Best Buy. The two immediately bond, and Kevin tells Clyde about his ability to talk with ghosts. Before Clyde can ask more questions, Kevin is released due to the coroner dropping the charges. However, in return, she takes him back to the morgue to have an orgy with the dead bodies. Before Kevin can object, he accidentally pops one of the heroin balloons and in his drugged out state he participates with the coroner. He eventually recovers, and fully disgusted, he races to Manny's contact to finish the drop. The job complete, Manny goes into the light, and Kevin returns to the massage parlor. However, Clyde is waiting for him there and suggests that Kevin move in with him. Kevin immediately agrees, and they depart.
25	2	"Digging Up The Past"	Adam Nix & Evan Nix	Brett Konner & Cody Heller	April 20, 2016
Kevin heads to Clyde's apartment and is shocked to discover that it is enormous. Clyde had bought up a bunch of celebrity domain names in the '90s, and when the internet became more popular, he sold them all, making him independently wealthy. After settling in, Kevin notices a tormented ghost haunting Clyde's apartment. The ghost, Mr. Faggie, was Clyde's middle school guidance counselor who had been fired when Clyde told the principal that Faggie had shown him his testicles. Faggie tells Kevin that in order for him to leave, Clyde must live up to his potential and win the Big Apple Idea Fair. The two work together to come up with the idea of bully-proof clothing. However, when they arrive at the fair, they realize that it is a competition for middle schoolers. In order to compete, they use Craigslist to find a young boy to wear the bully-proof clothing and win the competition. However, when they arrive to pick up the boy for the Idea Fair, they are caught in a To Catch a Predator-style sting and arrested. Mr. Faggie reveals that this was his plan all along, since Clyde's lie had caused him to be labeled a sex predator, and he departs into the light. Luckily, Clyde had held onto the domain name for the host of the show, and in exchange for selling it to him, Kevin and Clyde are let free. Once they return to the apartment, Clyde introduces Kevin to another idea, a website for a professional ghost service. Kevin agrees to return to his job as a freelance medium with Clyde's help.
26	3	"Bong Pong"	Adam Nix & Evan Nix	Evan Mann & Gareth Reynolds	April 20, 2016
Kevin goes to a Spencer Gifts to help remove a ghost that has been haunting the store. He meets a ghost named Weasel, who claims that he cannot depart to the afterlife until he wins the annual Bong Pong tournament, a Beer Pong-type competition that uses bongs instead of beer. Kevin tracks down his old partner, Nugget, and asks him to compete in the tournament with him. However, Nugget has become a neurosurgeon in the intervening years, and he refuses to compete on account of his wife disapproving of him smoking weed. Kevin is eventually able to convince to Nugget to participate in the contest, and with Clyde's help, Kevin is able to distract Nugget's wife and smuggle him out of the house. They compete in the tournament, but lose in the championship game on the final shot. Nugget apologizes to Weasel, but states that at least they won the tournament in 1987. Reminded that he had already won the tournament, Weasel departs into the light.
27	4	"The Cindy 500"	Adam Nix & Evan Nix	Jon Silberman & Josh Silberman	April 20, 2016
Kevin goes to a wedding to remove a ghost that is preventing a woman from having her father-in-law walk her down the aisle. The ghost turns out to be the woman's mother, who wants her daughter's real father to do the honor at the ceremony. However, the ghost was a porn star in life, and she is not sure who the real father is. Kevin and Clyde go to the ghost's manager who gives them a list of five-hundred people she had slept with. Through the process of elimination, Kevin and Clyde are able to narrow the possibilities to only thirty men. However, the paternity tests for thirty people is too expensive, so they bring their candidates onto a daytime talk show to expedite the process. The talk show host reveals that none of the men are the father, but that the DNA of the actual father was found on a pen given to them by the ghost's manager. With the father revealed, he is able to walk his daughter down the aisle and the ghost departs into the light.
28	5	"Weeknight at Skillitz"	Jay Karas	Scott Rutherford	April 20, 2016
While watching TV, Kevin notices a cardshark known as Danny Poker using a ghost to win a poker competition. Thrilled that there is another person out there with his ability, he resolves to find Danny Poker to talk to him about their mutual gift. Discovering that Danny will be at a Skillitz concert later that night, Kevin and Clyde attempt to get in early, but are not allowed in. However, the ghost of Skillitz is there and makes them a deal. If they clean up his apartment to hide his embarrassing death, he will give them two backstage passes. Upon arrival at Skillitz' place, they discover that he had died of autoerotic asphyxiation. They clean up the body and Skillitz goes into the light. Before they can leave the apartment, they are nearly discovered by a magazine reporter. They fake Skillitz' voice, and Kevin accidentally restarts a feud between Skillitz and DJ Deadrat by giving the reporter inflammatory statements about Deadrat while pretending to be Skillitz. Thrilled with the scoop, the reporter leaves the apartment, but takes the backstage passes with her. With no other options, Kevin and Clyde uses Skillitz' dead body to get into the show. Once inside, they prop up Skillitz' body at the DJ booth and search for Danny Poker. Just as they find him, Deadrat storms into the club and shoots Skillitz' body in response to the comments Kevin had made to the reporter. In the commotion, Danny Poker disappears, but Kevin and Clyde find his drivers license left behind at his table.
29	6	"Hawk Smith"	Josh Greenbaum	Jane Becker	April 20, 2016
Using the Danny Poker's drivers license, Kevin and Clyde track him to his apartment. Before they can introduce themselves, Danny snatches the card from them and slams the door in their faces. However, they overhear through the door that Danny's delivery of several hundred Cialis pills had not come through for a party he is having. Resolving to get on Danny's good side, they decide to obtain the drugs themselves. Clyde informs Kevin of a pharmacist nearby who needs ghost services, and they head there in hopes of obtaining the drugs as payment. The pharmacist agrees to their deal, and Kevin meets with a ghost who calls himself the Hawkman, a crime-fighting vigilante. In life, Hawkman had tried to stop a robbery of the pharmacy, but had died when he tried to intervene. Upon reviewing the security tape, they discover that the burglar works at Oinky's, a pizza place and arcade. They go to Oinky's and discover the perpetrator who flees on foot. Upon catching him, the thief tells them that it wasn't his fault. The pharmacist had orchestrated the robbery in order to sell the pills himself on the black market. Kevin and Clyde stop the pharmacist, and his death avenged, Hawkman disappears into the light. They take the defeated pharmacist's stash of stolen pills back to Danny Poker but discover that Danny has already gotten the drugs on his own. However, before Danny can shut the door on them again, Kevin reveals that he too can talk with ghosts. Impressed, Danny lets them into his party.
30	7	"Am-Ish"	Adam Nix & Evan Nix	Jon Silberman & Josh Silberman	April 20, 2016
At the party, Kevin fails numerous times to talk with Danny about their medium abilities. Danny is too busy hosting the party, and he tells Kevin that he cannot talk about ghosts at the party because someone might figure out how he is cheating at cards. Danny points out a ghost at the party and asks Kevin to take care of it for him since he is unable to. Kevin talks to the ghost, an elderly Amish man who has been haunting the party to spy on his son, Elijah, who has been refusing to return from his rumspringa. He tells Kevin to inform his son that Hannah, a woman at the Amish community, has recently become available after the death of her husband. Elijah agrees to return home, but upon their arrival, they discover that another man, Jebediah, is already courting Hannah. Kevin and Elijah work together to win Hannah away from Jebediah, but nothing seems to work. However, Kevin suspects that Jebediah is hiding something, and with Clyde's help, he proves to the Amish community that Jebediah is a lecherous fraud that has been moving among Amish communities to sleep with the women there. With Jebediah exposed, Elijah is free to court Hannah, and Elijah's father disappears into the light.
31	8	"The Duchess of Stourbridge"	Jay Karas	Evan Mann & Gareth Reynolds	April 20, 2016
As Clyde and Kevin return from Danny's party, Kevin meets the ghost of the Duchess of Stourbridge. She is an obese woman who had died while having a nude portrait made of her. After seeing the painting, she choked to death in disgust. She wants Kevin to fix her portrait and sends him to an auction where the painting is being sold. Kevin breaks into the winning bidder's home to alter the painting, but it is stolen by a cat burglar before he can get to it. In order to draw out the burglar, they purchase a painting at another auction and capture him when he arrives at their apartment to steal it. The thief, Hugh Janus, reveals that he has been stealing the paintings to sell to a Saudi sheik. However, Janus comes to the realization that the paintings he has been stealing are fakes, and surmises that the auction house has been switching the paintings for fakes after the sale. Kevin and Clyde track the real painting to an Italian restaurant owned by the auction house manager, who explains that he believes that real art should be available to the masses. Kevin agrees to keep his secret safe but insists on fixing the Duchess' portrait. With the painting fixed to the Duchess' satisfaction, she departs into the light. Their task complete, they attempt to contact Janus, but unbeknownst to them he has been killed.
32	9	"The Shawshanked Redemption"	Heath Cullens	Scott Rutherford	April 20, 2016
Clyde and Kevin attempt to get Danny Poker to invest in their ghost services business, but he declines and suggests that they pursue a high-profile ghost case to attract investors. They follow the advice and go to a prison, where the warden promises press exposure for solving the case. Kevin meets a female ghost who wants him to help her finish a tattoo on one of the inmates. He enters the prison undercover to complete the tattoo on a man named Owen. However, before he can start the tattoo, Owen is shanked to death, and in the ensuing riot, the warden is also killed. The ghost of the warden tells Kevin that he wants him to escape from the prison. His mission in life was to get more funding for the prison. He surmises that if the politicians see that an out-of-shape inmate like Kevin can escape, that the prison will be sure to get more funding. Kevin uses Clyde to obtain tools to break out of prison, and he escapes through a sewage pipe into the morgue. Kevin finishes the tattoo on the dead body of Owen and then takes the place of Owen in the body bag to escape the prison. However, he is caught by the guards and delivered to the new warden. Since there is no record of his arrest, he is allowed to leave, but the warden explains that the situation has brought more attention to the prison and will result in more funding. His mission for both the ghosts complete, they depart into the light. However, the embarrassment brought by Kevin's arrival results in the warden refusing to let him use the case for press exposure.
33	10	"Diaper Training"	Jay Karas	Ryan Enright	April 20, 2016
Kevin and Clyde are invited to Danny Poker's apartment to hang out. They begin drinking, and the trio black out. During the morning, Clyde is missing, and Kevin and Danny attempt to use clues in the apartment to locate him. They head to a Mongolian barbecue joint where a waitress directs them to the basement where Clyde was last seen. Kevin discovers a secret room used for underground sumo wrestling and meets a ghost that informs Kevin that he was there the night before and had fought a sumo match. He tells Kevin that Clyde was taken by Yakuza to a Japanese bath house. The Yakuza leader tells them that Clyde is now his property because Danny had bet that Kevin would lose a sumo match against Clyde's life. Seeing Kevin's potential as a sumo champion, the Yakuza gives Kevin another wager. If Kevin can beat his champion, he can have Clyde back. If he loses, then the Yakuza boss gets Kevin as well as Clyde as his possessions. Kevin returns to the Mongolian barbecue joint to train with the ghost. Upon completing the ghosts training, involving sleeping and binging on ice cream, Kevin faces off against the Yakuza boss' champion. Kevin and the champion split the first two rounds, and in the decisive final round, Kevin rips off the mawashi of the Yakuza's champion, winning the bout. The ghost trainer, having finally trained a champion, departs into the light.
34	11	"Medieval Dead"	Josh Greenbaum	Brett Konner	April 20, 2016
Kevin heads to a museum and meets a ghost who calls himself King Stevelin Newcastle. He tells Kevin that he was ambushed and betrayed by one of his knights, Jared the Liar (Alex Karpovsky), who stole his crown. He wants Kevin to return the crown to his rightful heir. When he questions the museum curator, she clarifies that King Stevelin is actually "Steve", a museum cashier that was into live action role-playing or LARPing. Kevin and Clyde contact Steve's "son", Lonathan (Keith Powell), and request that he help retake the crown from Jared. He agrees if Kevin and Clyde will help round up Steve's knights. With his "father"'s group reunited, they confront Jared and his group. Lonathan defeats Jared and takes back the crown, allowing Steven to depart into the light. During the celebration, Lonathan downplays Kevin's role in the victory, and Clyde joins the other LARPers in teasing Kevin. As a result, when Danny Poker contacts Kevin to come with him to Vegas, Kevin deliberately leaves Clyde out and leaves the celebration to join Danny in Vegas.
35	12	"Abra-Cadaver"	Heath Cullens	Cody Heller	April 20, 2016
In Vegas, Kevin is woken up by the ghost of a woman who had been accidentally killed by Danny Poker during a party the previous night. Before Kevin can begin to help her, Danny uses a device to force her to go into the light despite not solving her problems. He tells Kevin that he had paid a company to create the device after watching Kevin help send the Amish ghost into the light during his party. He claims this is a shortcut to sending ghosts away and will remove the need to solve the ghosts' problems before dismissing them. Upon returning to New York, Kevin borrows the device that Danny had shown him. With Danny's device, he easily solves multiple cases before encountering a ghost magician named Fantastic Jeff who steals his device to force him to complete his unfinished business. The magician had died during one of his tricks at a birthday party for a boy named Dean, and he wants Kevin to complete his show. Kevin finds the adult Dean and completes the show, allowing Fantastic Jeff to go into the light and get the device back. Kevin returns the device to Danny, and upon telling him that he was able to solve multiple ghost cases easily with Danny's device, he suggests that they team up.
36	13	"Death List Three"	Heath Cullens	Dan Lagana	April 20, 2016
Kevin and Danny are working together on their streamlined ghost services partnership. Kevin accidentally drops the device, causing it to short-circuit, and one of the ghosts that he had previously sent into the light with the device appears to him. Instead of forcing the ghosts into the light, the device had actually trapped the ghosts inside it. Kevin goes to Clyde for help, who is upset to learn that Kevin has partnered with Danny without telling him. With Clyde unwilling to help him, Kevin returns to Danny, but he reveals that he knew all along that the device was simply trapping ghosts. He has been using the trapped ghosts as batteries for a line of vibrating dildos. Appalled by his behavior, Kevin says that he will stop him. However, Danny drugs him and buries him alive. Kevin is able to escape and returns to Clyde who finally agrees to help stop Danny. They surmise that they need to take down Danny's partners Jim and Adam before they can take down Danny. They first track down Danny's ghost partner, Jim, and Clyde uses the device to trap him. They then visit Danny's business partner, Adam, at his office. Adam attempts to kill them with a samurai sword, but Clyde luckily disarms him and then accidentally decapitates him. Clyde and Kevin then crash Danny's investors' meeting, stealing his line of dildos, intending to free the ghosts trapped inside. Using the help of the ghost of Benjamin Franklin, Clyde and Kevin hook the dildos up to a kite to send electricity from a lightning strike and free the ghosts. However, Danny catches them in the act and prepares to murder them both. Before he can, Danny is electrocuted by the lightning strike, which frees the ghosts and kills Danny. Before Danny can depart into the light, Kevin traps him with the device. With Danny defeated, Clyde forgives Kevin and agrees to continue their partnership.
