= David Margulies =

American actor (1937–2016)

- Born: David Joseph Margulies; February 19, 1937; Brooklyn, New York City, U.S.
- Died: January 11, 2016 (aged 78); Manhattan, New York City, U.S.
- Occupation: Actor
- Years active: 1972–2015
- Spouse: Carol Grant (divorced)
- Children: 1

David Joseph Margulies (February 19, 1937 – January 11, 2016) was an American actor. He is known for his role as Lenny Clotch, the Mayor of New York City in Ghostbusters (1984) and Ghostbusters II (1989), and his recurring role as Neil Mink on The Sopranos (2000–2007).

== Early life ==
Margulies was born in Brooklyn, New York City to a Jewish family. He was the son of Runya (née Zeltzer), a nurse and museum employee, and Harry David Margulies, a lawyer. He graduated from City College of New York.

== Career ==
Margulies made his stage debut in the off-Broadway play Golden 6 (1958). In that same year, he joined the American Shakespeare Festival as an apprentice, which led to his receiving an Actors' Equity Association contract for the 1960 theater season. His first Broadway appearance was in the 1973 revival of The Iceman Cometh.

His film credits include The Front (1976), Last Embrace (1979), All That Jazz (1979), Hide in Plain Sight (1980), Dressed to Kill (1980), Times Square (1980), I'm Dancing as Fast as I Can (1982), Daniel (1983), Ghostbusters (1984), Brighton Beach Memoirs (1986), 9½ Weeks (1986), Ishtar (1987), Running on Empty (1988), Ghostbusters II (1989), Out on a Limb (1992), A Stranger Among Us (1992), Ace Ventura: Pet Detective (1994), and Fading Gigolo (2013).

His television credits include Kojak, Tales from the Darkside, Spenser: For Hire, The Days and Nights of Molly Dodd, Chicago Hope, NYPD Blue, Northern Exposure, Touched by an Angel, four episodes of Law & Order, and eight episodes of The Sopranos as mob boss Tony Soprano's lawyer Neil Mink.

== Personal life and death ==
Margulies died on January 11, 2016, of cancer in Manhattan, New York, at the age of 78. He was survived by his partner, actress Lois Smith, as well as a son Johnathon, and a grandson from a previous marriage.

== Filmography ==
=== Film ===
Year	Title	Role	Notes
1972	Scarecrow in a Garden of Cucumbers	Walter Mitty	Film debut
1976	The Front	William Phelps	
1979	Last Embrace	Rabbi Josh Drexel	
1979	All That Jazz	Larry Goldie	
1979	Night-Flowers	Psychiatrist	
1980	Hide in Plain Sight	Detective Reilly	
1980	Dressed to Kill	Dr. Levy	
1980	Times Square	Dr. Zymansky	
1982	I'm Dancing as Fast as I Can	Walter Kress	
1983	Daniel	Dr. Duberstein	
1984	Ghostbusters	Mayor Lenny Clotch	
1986	9½ Weeks	Harvey	
1986	Brighton Beach Memoirs	Mr. Farber	
1987	Candy Mountain	Lawyer	
1987	Ishtar	Mr. Clarke	
1987	Magic Sticks	Goldfarb	
1988	Running on Empty	Dr. Jonah Reiff	
1989	Ghostbusters II	Lenny Clotch, The Mayor of New York City	
1990	Funny About Love	Dr. Benjamin	
1992	A Stranger Among Us	Lt. Oliver	
1992	Out on a Limb	Mr. Buchenwald	
1992	Day of Atonement	(English version, voice)	AKA: Le grand pardon II
1993	Family Prayers	Uncle Sam	
1994	Ace Ventura: Pet Detective	Doctor	
1997	Hudson River Blues	Stan	
1997	Lifebreath	Abe Gross	
1998	Celebrity	Counselor Adelman	
1999	Man of the Century	Mr. Meyerscholtz	
2000	Looking for an Echo	Dr. Ludwig	
2003	Bought & Sold	Kutty Nazarian	
2004	Invitation to a Suicide	Roman Malek	
2005	Whiskey School	Rex Michaels	
2006	Ira & Abby	Dr. Arnold Friedman	
2007	Noise	Heart Attack Man	
2010	All Good Things	Mayor	
2011	Roadie	Don Muller	
2013	The Girl on the Train	Morris Herzman	
2013	Fading Gigolo	Chief Rebbe	
2014	A Most Violent Year	Saul Lefkowitz	
2016	License Plates	Jacob	
2016	Adam Bloom	Harris Sutton	Final film
2016	Curmudgeons	Ralph	Short, Released posthumously

=== Television ===
Year	Title	Role	Notes
1977	Kojak	Midge Piper	1 episode
1985	Tales from the Darkside	Gil Hurn	Episode: "Distant Signals"
1985	The Equalizer	Macklin	Episode: "Desperately"
1986	The Equalizer	Eugene Whitman	Episode: "Heartstrings"
1989	Kojak: Ariana	Papas the Chef	TV movie
1991	Law & Order	Simpson	Episode: "A Death in the Family"
1993	Law & Order	Tommy Zanescu	Episode: " Securitate"
1994	The Adventures of Young Indiana Jones: Hollywood Follies	Carl Laemmle	TV movie
1995	Law & Order	Dr. Jordan Delbert	Episode: "Seed"
2000–2007	The Sopranos	Neil Mink	8 episodes
2001	Touched by an Angel	Sam Silverstein	1 episode
2004	Law & Order	Dr. Jack Clayburg	Episode: "Fixed"
2012	The Good Wife	Richard	1 episode
2013	Blue Bloods	Solomon	1 episode
2015	Law & Order: Special Victims Unit	Dr. Eric Setrakian	Episode: "Granting Immunity"
2016	Madoff	Elie Wiesel	TV miniseries (4 episodes)

== Additional Broadway credits ==
- Comedians (1976)
- The West Side Waltz (1981)
- Brighton Beach Memoirs (1983)
- Conversations with My Father (1992)
- Angels in America: Millennium Approaches (1993)
- Angels in America: Perestroika (1993)
- A Thousand Clowns (1996 revival)
- 45 Seconds from Broadway (2001)
- Wonderful Town (2003 revival)
