= A Sudden Case of Christmas =

- Theatrical release poster
- Directed by: Peter Chelsom
- Written by: Peter Chelsom; Tinker Lindsay; Gianluca Bomprezzi; Neri Parenti; Federico Baccomo; Francesco Patierno
- Produced by: Guglielmo Marchetti; Stefano Bethlen; Nik Bower
- Starring: Danny DeVito; Andie MacDowell; Wilmer Valderrama; Lucy DeVito; Trey Brain
- Cinematography: Christophe Lanzenberg
- Edited by: Chiara Griziotti
- Music by: Andrea Farri
- Production companies: Notorious Pictures; Riverstone Pictures
- Distributed by: Notorious Pictures
- Release dates: November 7, 2024 (United States); December 5, 2024 (Italy)
- Running time: 91 minutes
- Country: Italy
- Language: English

A Sudden Case of Christmas is a 2024 Italian English-language Christmas comedy film written by Peter Chelsom, Tinker Lindsay, Gianluca Bomprezzi, Neri Parenti, Federico Baccomo and Francesco Patierno, directed by Chelsom and starring Danny DeVito and Andie MacDowell. It is a remake of the 2022 Italian film Improvvisamente Natale.

== Premise ==
Claire's parents are divorcing and they take her to her grandfather's hotel in Italy to tell her this. In one last effort to save their marriage, Claire convinces her family to celebrate one last Christmas together, in the middle of August.

== Cast ==
- Danny DeVito as Lawrence
- Andie MacDowell as Rose
- Wilmer Valderrama as Jacob
- Lucy DeVito as Abbie
- Antonella Rose as Claire
- José Zúñiga as Mark
- Adrian Dunbar as Otto
- Valeria Cavalli
- Mario de la Rosa
- Francesco Salvi
- Denis Conway
- Kate Muda as Johanna
- Matteo Miraglia as Niccoló

== Production ==
On May 12, 2024, it was announced that Danny DeVito, Andie MacDowell and several other actors were cast in the film.

On May 16, 2024, it was announced that Shout! Studios acquired North American distribution rights to the film.

== Release ==
The film was released on digital in the United States on November 7, 2024. It was theatrically released in Italy on December 5, 2024.

== Reception ==
Monique Jones of Common Sense Media awarded the film four stars out of five.

Catherine Bray of The Guardian awarded the film three stars out of five.
