= Deadbeat (TV series) =

2014 American sitcom

- Title screen from seasons 2 and 3
- Genre: Supernatural sitcom
- Created by: Cody Heller; Brett Konner
- Starring: Tyler Labine; Brandon T. Jackson; Lucy DeVito; Cat Deeley; Kal Penn; Kurt Braunohler
- Country of origin: United States
- Original language: English
- No. of seasons: 3
- No. of episodes: 36 (list of episodes)

Production
- Running time: 22–23 minutes
- Production companies: Plan B Entertainment; Lionsgate Television; Dakota Pictures

Original release
- Network: Hulu
- Release: April 9, 2014 – April 20, 2016

Deadbeat is an American supernatural sitcom created by Cody Heller and Brett Konner about medium Kevin Pacalioglu, played by Tyler Labine, first released on Hulu on April 9, 2014. Three seasons were broadcast before Hulu canceled the series on June 5, 2016.

== Plot ==
Kevin "Pac" Pacalioglu (Tyler Labine) is a lazy slacker, and a medium for hire, who attempts to solve various ghosts' unresolved issues, so that they can move on to a final resting place. During Season 1 and 2, with the help of his best friend and drug dealer, Roofie (Brandon T. Jackson), Kevin was interfering with Camomile White (Cat Deeley) to stop her from causing harm to people as a false medium. During his issues with Camomile he tries to date her quiet and reluctant personal assistant, Sue Tabernacle (Lucy DeVito), who dies in an accident and ends up as a ghost who can't move on living in Kevin's apartment. In Season 1, Pac competes against Camomile for work, whereas in Season 2, Camomile becomes a TV Host while blackmailing Kevin into being her "bodyguard" and takes advantage of his talents for her gain. After the events in Season 2, Kevin moves into an apartment with Clyde (Kal Penn) and works with a medium known as "Danny Poker" (Kurt Braunohler) who uses his talent to win at Poker competitions.

== Cast and characters ==
=== Main ===
- Tyler Labine as Kevin "Pac" Pacalioglu: a stoner and medium who uses his ability to communicate with ghosts as a means to make a living.
- Brandon T. Jackson as Rufus "Roofie" Jones (seasons 1-2): Kevin's only friend and drug dealer.
- Lucy DeVito as Sue Tabernacle (seasons 1-2): Camomile's timid assistant.
- Cat Deeley as Camomile White (seasons 1-2): a famous medium, and occasional rival of Kevin, who lacks the actual ability to communicate with ghosts.
- Kal Penn as Clyde Shapiro (season 3): Kevin's roommate.
- Kurt Braunohler as Danny Poker (season 3): another medium who uses his skills for profit.

=== Recurring ===
Title screen from Season 1.

- Brad Williams as Tyson
- Matthew Porretta as Crosby / Matthew Biscotti
- Modi as Menachem Mendel
- Meryl Hathaway as Millie
- Todd Alan Crain as Wesley
- Megan Neuringer as Nurse
- Paul Fitzgerald as Detective Crosby, himself
- Samantha Bee as Darcy
- Godfrey as Shaky Hands
- Adrian Martinez as Hector
- Teresa Yenque as Zoila (season 2)
- Lauren Adams as Carol (season 3)

=== Guest ===
- Alex Karpovsky as Jerryd the Liar
- Ross Marquand as Hugh Janus
- Efren Ramirez as Manny
- Lynn Cohen as Edith Jane
- Joe Pantoliano as Famous Actor
- Todd Barry as Daniel L. Turner
- Jason Biggs as Reed Kelly
- Peter Grosz as Jeremy Goldberg
- Darrell Hammond as Don Soderbergh
- Iliza Shlesinger as Shelly
- Ray Wise as Mayor Meyer
- Fred Armisen as Dead Janitor
- Michael Ian Black as TJ
- Danny DeVito as Giuseppe Monamocce
- James Franco as Johnny Penis
- Gilbert Gottfried as Suicidal Man
- Zachary Levi as Abraham Lincoln
- Jim Norton as Carl
- Geoffrey Owens as Arthur
- Dean Edwards as Gucci Man

== Overview ==
Season	Episodes	Release date
1	10	April 9, 2014
2	13	April 20, 2015
3	13	April 20, 2016

== Reception ==
On review aggregator website Rotten Tomatoes, the first season received a score of 80% based on 10 reviews with an average rating of 5.5/10. The site's critical consensus states, "Deadbeat aims low and scores high thanks to its promising, crass comedy and willingness to indulge in the bizarre."

== International broadcasters ==
In Australia, the series premiered on April 15, 2015 on The Comedy Channel. In India the show premiered on July 8, 2015 on Comedy Central India. In Spain the show was broadcast by Comedy Central Spain. In Canada the show is on the streaming service Crave TV.

== Home media ==
In 2014, Season 1 was released on DVD exclusively through Target.

Season	Region 1	Region 2	Region 4	Discs	Extras
One	2014	N/A	N/A	1	"Meet Camomile and Sue" featurette; "Meet Pac and Roofie" featurette; "Medium For Hire - What is Deadbeat?" featurette
