= Roadie (2011 film) =

American comedy film

- Theatrical release poster
- Directed by: Michael Cuesta
- Written by: Gerald Cuesta; Michael Cuesta
- Produced by: Sirad Balducci; Mike Downey
- Starring: Ron Eldard; Jill Hennessy; Bobby Cannavale; Lois Smith; David Margulies; Catherine Wolf
- Cinematography: Andrew Lilien
- Edited by: Kane Platt
- Music by: Chris Seefried
- Production company: Hero Content
- Distributed by: Magnolia Pictures
- Release dates: April 23, 2011 (Tribeca Film Festival); January 6, 2012 (United States)
- Running time: 95 minutes
- Country: United States
- Language: English
- Box office: $7,825

Roadie is a 2011 American comedy film directed by Michael Cuesta and written by Gerald Cuesta and Michael Cuesta. The film stars Ron Eldard, Jill Hennessy, Bobby Cannavale, Lois Smith, David Margulies and Catherine Wolf. The film was released on January 6, 2012, by Magnolia Pictures.

== Cast ==
- Ron Eldard as Jimmy
- Jill Hennessy as Nikki
- Bobby Cannavale as Randy Stevens
- Lois Smith as Mom
- David Margulies as Don Muller
- Catherine Wolf as Marilyn Muller
- Suzette Gunn as Lizette

== Release ==
The film premiered at the Tribeca Film Festival on April 23, 2011. The film was released on January 6, 2012, by Magnolia Pictures.
