= I Need That =

Comedic stage play by Theresa Rebeck

- Original language: English
- Written by: Theresa Rebeck
- Characters: Sam; Amelia; Foster
- Genre: Comedy
- Setting: New Jersey, present day

Premiere
- Date: 2022
- Place: Dorset Theatre Festival

I Need That is a comedic stage play written by American playwright Theresa Rebeck. The play premiered on Broadway at the Todd Haimes Theatre as part of Roundabout Theatre Company's 2023–2024 season.

== Synopsis ==
Cited by the health department for hoarding, Sam has to clean the place up or be evicted. But he can't let go of anything, no matter how much his daughter Amelia and his friend Foster urge him to face reality. The past holds them in its grip while the future arrives.

== Original cast and characters ==
Character	Original Broadway cast
Sam	Danny Devito
Amelia	Lucy Devito
Foster	Ray Anthony Thomas

== Production history ==
The play first had a staged reading at the Dorset Theatre Festival in Dorset, Vermont in August 2022. The play was directed by Moritz von Stuelpnagel. This production was announced to be a part of Roundabout Theatre Company's 2023-2024 Broadway season with previews beginning October 13, 2023 and an opening date of November 2, 2023. The play ran for 68 performances closing on December 30, 2023, at the newly renamed Todd Haimes Theatre. The set was designed by Alexander Dodge with costumes by Tilly Grimes.
