= Curmudgeons (film) =

- Vimeo thumbnail
- Directed by: Danny DeVito
- Written by: Joshua Conkel
- Produced by: Danny DeVito; Lucy DeVito; Jake DeVito
- Starring: David Margulies; Danny DeVito; Lucy DeVito; Sarah Nina Hayon; Kett Turton
- Cinematography: Łukasz Bielan
- Edited by: Brett Haley
- Music by: Jon Brion
- Production company: Jersey 2nd Avenue
- Release date: April 15, 2016 (Tribeca)
- Running time: 16 minutes
- Country: United States
- Language: English

Curmudgeons is a 2016 American comedy short film directed, produced by, and starring Danny DeVito. It is written and co-produced by Joshua Conkel.

The film was nominated for the Best Narrative Short award in the Tribeca Film Festival. It was also selected as Vimeo's first official Staff Pick.

== Plot summary ==
Ralph Pajovic, a foul-mouthed elderly man living in a Brooklyn assisted living facility attended to by Daniela, is visited by his granddaughter, Robin. The two discuss family matters and someone named "Jackie" until Robin inquires if Ralph loved his late wife (Robin's grandmother). Ralph reveals that, although he was fond of his wife, he had never truly fallen in love until now. He is then visited by Brent, Jackie's grandson, who had brought his grandfather along, revealed to be another foul-mouthed old man who happens to be Ralph's lover (in a wheelchair), astonishing Ralph. The couple bemoan the fact that they live separately and briefly get into an argument. Jackie eventually gets Brent and Ralph to slow dance together in lieu of himself (as he is recovering from hip surgery), savouring the moment. Robin and Daniela join in, also dancing together. Jackie abruptly stops the music and proposes to Ralph. The entire visit is revealed to have been a plan by the four of them. Ralph, overcome with disbelief and emotion, embraces Jackie and accepts his proposal.

== Cast ==
- David Margulies as Ralph Pajovic
- Danny DeVito as Jackie
- Lucy DeVito as Robin
- Sarah Nina Hayon as Daniela
- Kett Turton as Brent

== Production ==
In 2012, Danny DeVito and his daughter Lucy watched a one-act play at the Ensemble Studio Theatre in Manhattan, New York, where Lucy worked. The play was written by Joshua Conkel, and starred David Margulies as Ralph Pajovic. Lucy suggested that it be turned into a film, and in the summer of 2015, asked Conkel if he wished to write the screenplay for the film, which he did. DeVito took up the mantle of director, while Jake DeVito and Lucy took the job of producer.

The film was shot over the span of three days in a Brooklyn senior home. Margulies died in January 2016, a few months before the film's release. DeVito was able to show him the finished film before his death.

== Reception ==
The film was received well by critics. Collin Souter, writing for RogerEbert.com, praised the film, describing it as "very funny, romantic and one of the most heartfelt short films you’ll ever see." Jeffrey Bowers, from Vimeo Blog, noted that the film had a "decidedly un-Hollywood vibe," in part due to it being a "labor of love and a family affair." Curmudgeons was also chosen to be the first Vimeo Staff Pick Premiere.
