= Drag (2026 film) =

- Theatrical release poster
- Directed by: Raviv Ullman; Greg Yagolnitzer
- Written by: Raviv Ullman; Greg Yagolnitzer
- Produced by: Danny DeVito; Lucy DeVito; Jake DeVito
- Starring: Lizzy Caplan; Lucy DeVito; John Stamos; Christine Ko
- Cinematography: Ben Goodman
- Edited by: Malinda-Zehner Guerra
- Music by: Patrick Stump
- Production companies: Asbury Point Productions; Jersey Films 2nd Avenue
- Distributed by: Briarcliff Entertainment
- Release dates: March 13, 2026 (SXSW); January 29, 2027 (United States)
- Running time: 86 minutes
- Country: United States
- Language: English

Drag is a 2026 American comedy thriller film written and directed by Raviv Ullman and Greg Yagolnitzer in their feature-length directional debuts. It stars Lizzy Caplan, Lucy DeVito, John Stamos, and Christine Ko.

== Plot ==
Two burglars face disaster during a simple home heist when one suffers a back injury. As the clock ticks and pain sets in, their escape becomes increasingly chaotic before the owner's return.

== Cast ==
- Lizzy Caplan
- Lucy DeVito
- John Stamos
- Christine Ko

== Production ==
Principal photography began in March 2025. Ben Goodman served as the cinematographer.

== Release ==
Drag premiered at the SXSW on March 13, 2026. In May 2026, Briarcliff Entertainment acquired the film. It is scheduled to be released in theaters on January 29, 2027.

== Reception ==
The film has a 93% rating on Rotten Tomatoes based on 14 reviews. Ross Bonaime of Collider rated the film a 6 out of 10. Josh Korngut of Dread Central awarded the film four stars out of five.
