= Little Demon (TV series) =

Adult animated sitcom television series

- Promotional poster
- Genre: Animated sitcom; Black comedy; Adult animation; Psychological horror; Thriller; Body horror
- Created by: Darcy Fowler; Seth Kirschner; Kieran Valla
- Voices of: Aubrey Plaza; Danny DeVito; Lucy DeVito
- Composers: Dan Romer; John Zarcone
- Countries of origin: Canada; United States
- Original language: English
- No. of seasons: 1
- No. of episodes: 10

Production
- Executive producers: Darcy Fowler; Seth Kirschner; Kieran Valla; Dan Harmon; Aubrey Plaza; Jennifer McCarron; Jake DeVito; Lucy DeVito; Danny DeVito; Karey Dornetto; Corey Campodonico; Alex Bulkley
- Producers: Steve Levy; Monica Mitchell
- Editors: Mike Api; Charles Jones
- Production companies: Jersey 2nd Ave; Evil Hag Productions; Harmonious Claptrap; ShadowMachine; Atomic Cartoons; FXP

Original release
- Network: FXX
- Release: August 25 – October 20, 2022

Little Demon is an adult animated sitcom created by Darcy Fowler, Seth Kirschner and Kieran Valla for [FXX]], which aired from August 25, 2022 to October 20, 2022. The series features the voices of Aubrey Plaza, Danny DeVito, and Lucy DeVito. This show is the first to be aimed at an adult audience and animated by Atomic Cartoons.

== Synopsis ==
13 years after being impregnated by Satan, Laura and her Antichrist daughter, Chrissy, attempt to live an ordinary life in Delaware, but are constantly overwhelmed by monstrous forces, including Satan, who wants custody of Chrissy's soul.

== Cast ==
=== Main ===
- Aubrey Plaza as Laura Feinberg
- Danny DeVito as Satan
- Lucy DeVito as Chrissy Feinberg

=== Recurring ===
- Eugene Cordero as Bennigan Aquino
- Lennon Parham as Darlene
- Michael Shannon as Unshaven Man
- Seth Kirschner as Erwin
- Ali Ahn as Arabella
- Charlie McWade as Snake with Arms

=== Guest stars ===
- Sam Richardson as Asmodeus ("Possession Obsession")
- Arnold Schwarzenegger as Game Show Host ("Everybody's Dying for the Weekend")
- William Jackson Harper as Jimmy ("Everybody's Dying for the Weekend")
- Shangela as Queen Inichoochiama ("Everybody's Dying for the Weekend")
- Patrick Wilson as Everett ("Everybody's Dying for the Weekend")
- Dave Bautista as Baka ("Night of the Leeches")
- June Diane Raphael as Amanda ("Night of the Leeches")
- Mark Ruffalo as Bark Woofalo ("The Antichrist's Monster")
- Anthony Atamanuik as Gus ("Satan's Lot")
- Lamorne Morris as Michael ("Satan's Lot")
- Pamela Adlon as Sea Hag ("Wet Bodies")
- Rhea Perlman as Durlawn ("Wet Bodies")
- Mel Brooks as Millipede ("Village of the Found")
- Toks Olagundoye as Vanessa ("Village of the Found")
- Richard Kind as himself ("Village of the Found")
- Lea Salonga as Amalia / Dia ("The Antichrist's Monster", "Village of the Found")

== Episodes ==
No.	Title	Directed by	Written by	Original release date	Prod. code	U.S. viewers (millions)
1	"First Blood"	Ben Bjelajac & Jack Shih	Darcy Fowler, Seth Kirschner & Kieran Valla	August 25, 2022	101	0.264
2	"Possession Obsession"	Samantha Arnett	Darcy Fowler, Seth Kirschner & Kieran Valla	August 25, 2022	102	0.199
3	"Everybody's Dying for the Weekend"	Kelly Turnbull (Note: Miscredited as "Kelly Turnball")	Darcy Fowler, Seth Kirschner & Kieran Valla	September 1, 2022	103	0.256
4	"Popularity: Origin of Evil"	Ben Bjelajac	Miles Woods	September 8, 2022	104	0.119
5	"Night of the Leeches"	Samantha Arnett	Samantha Riley	September 15, 2022	105	0.166
6	"The Antichrist's Monster"	Kelly Turnbull	Lillian Yu	September 22, 2022	106	0.117
7	"Satan's Lot"	Ben Bjelajac	Brian Prodi Flynn	September 29, 2022	107	0.264
8	"Domestic Disturbance VIII"	Samantha Arnett	Darcy Fowler, Seth Kirschner & Kieran Valla	October 6, 2022	108	0.183
9	"Wet Bodies"	Kelly Turnbull	Karey Dornetto	October 13, 2022	109	0.187
10	"Village of the Found"	Jeanette Moreno King & Ben Bjelajac	Darcy Fowler, Seth Kirschner, Kieran Valla & Keyshawn C. Garraway	October 20, 2022	110	0.183

== Release ==
The series premiered on August 25, 2022, on FXX in the United States and Canada.

The series premiered in Asia, Australasia and Europe on September 21, 2022, on Disney+ (via Star) and in Latin America on February 8, 2023, on Star+. In the UK & Ireland, it was released on January 18, 2023. The series was removed from Hulu on May 26, 2023, and neither a renewal for a second season nor the show's cancellation have been confirmed.

== Reception ==
The review aggregator website Rotten Tomatoes reported an 81% approval rating based on 16 critic reviews. The website's critics consensus reads, "Little Demon heaps on the gore but maintains a disarming sweetness, making for an agreeably zany satanic sit-down." Metacritic, which uses a weighted average, assigned a score of 64 out of 100 based on 9 critics, indicating "generally favorable reviews".
