= Charlie McWade =

American television and film actor (born 1974)

- Born: January 2, 1974 (age 52); Queens, New York, U.S.
- Occupation: Actor

Charlie McWade (born January 2, 1974, in Queens, New York) is an American television and film actor. He is perhaps best known for his role in the television series Third Watch as NYPD Officer Steve Gusler.

== Filmography ==
Videogames
Year	Title	Role
2008	Goosebumps Horrorland	Boy Player
2008	Grand Theft Auto IV	The Crowd of Liberty City

Film and Television
Year	Title	Role	Notes
2022	Little Demon	Snake with Arms (voice)	7 episodes
2017	Earn the Season	Donald Becker	Short film
2016	Blue Bloods	Bruno Gallo	TV series
2016	Falling Water	Mr. Beattie	TV series
2007	Street Fighter: The Later Years	Mr. Weingert	TV series
2001–2002	Third Watch	NYPD Officer Steve Gusler	7 episodes
2000	Road Trip	Brian	Film
1999	Early Edition	Woods Watcher	#4.8
1999	Now and Again	Woods Watcher	#1.7 "A Girl's Life
