= Hurry Up, or I'll Be 30 =

- Theatrical release poster
- Directed by: Joseph Jacoby
- Written by: David Wiltse; Joseph Jacoby
- Produced by: Joseph Jacoby
- Starring: John Lefkowitz; Linda De Coff; Danny DeVito
- Cinematography: Burleigh Wartes
- Edited by: Stan Warnow
- Music by: Stephen Lawrence
- Distributed by: AVCO Embassy Pictures
- Release date: November 14, 1973
- Running time: 84 minutes
- Country: United States
- Language: English

Hurry Up, or I'll Be 30 (also known as I Am Waiting No More) is a 1973 American comedy-drama film starring John Lefkowitz, Linda De Coff and Danny DeVito. The film was directed by Joseph Jacoby.

This film is one of several critically acclaimed low-budget films of the 1970s. The picture had its official New York City theatrical release, presented by Joseph E. Levine, in November 1973 to high national critical acclaim, with noted film critic Vincent Canby of The New York Times calling it "A wryly affectionate portrait of a younger Marty." In December 2009, The New York Times re-printed Canby's 1973 review in a piece that selected three pictures from the 1970s.

In 2009 the copyright owners of the picture, Jacoby Entertainment, Ltd., were alerted to the circulation of unauthorized and sub-standard DVDs in the marketplace, appearing under the name of I Am Waiting No More. The unlicensed copies featured a pilfered photograph of Danny DeVito taken from a different source at a much later time. The disseminators of the illegal DVDs were identified by the picture's copyright owner and were successfully sued in California civil court.

== Plot ==
Brooklyn man George Trapani begins to suffer a severe identity crisis as he is about to turn 30. As his birthday approaches, he is forced to come to terms with his lack of success — in business, in love and in general. Desperate to make his life a success, he tries to commit himself to a serious relationship and do the things 30-year-olds are supposed to do based on the standards of society.

== Cast ==
- John Lefkowitz as George Trapani
- Linda De Coff as Jackie Tice
- Ronald Anton as Vince Trapani
- Maureen Byrnes as Flo
- Danny DeVito as Petey

== See also ==
- List of American films of 1973
