= Danny DeVito =

American actor, comedian and filmmaker (born 1944)

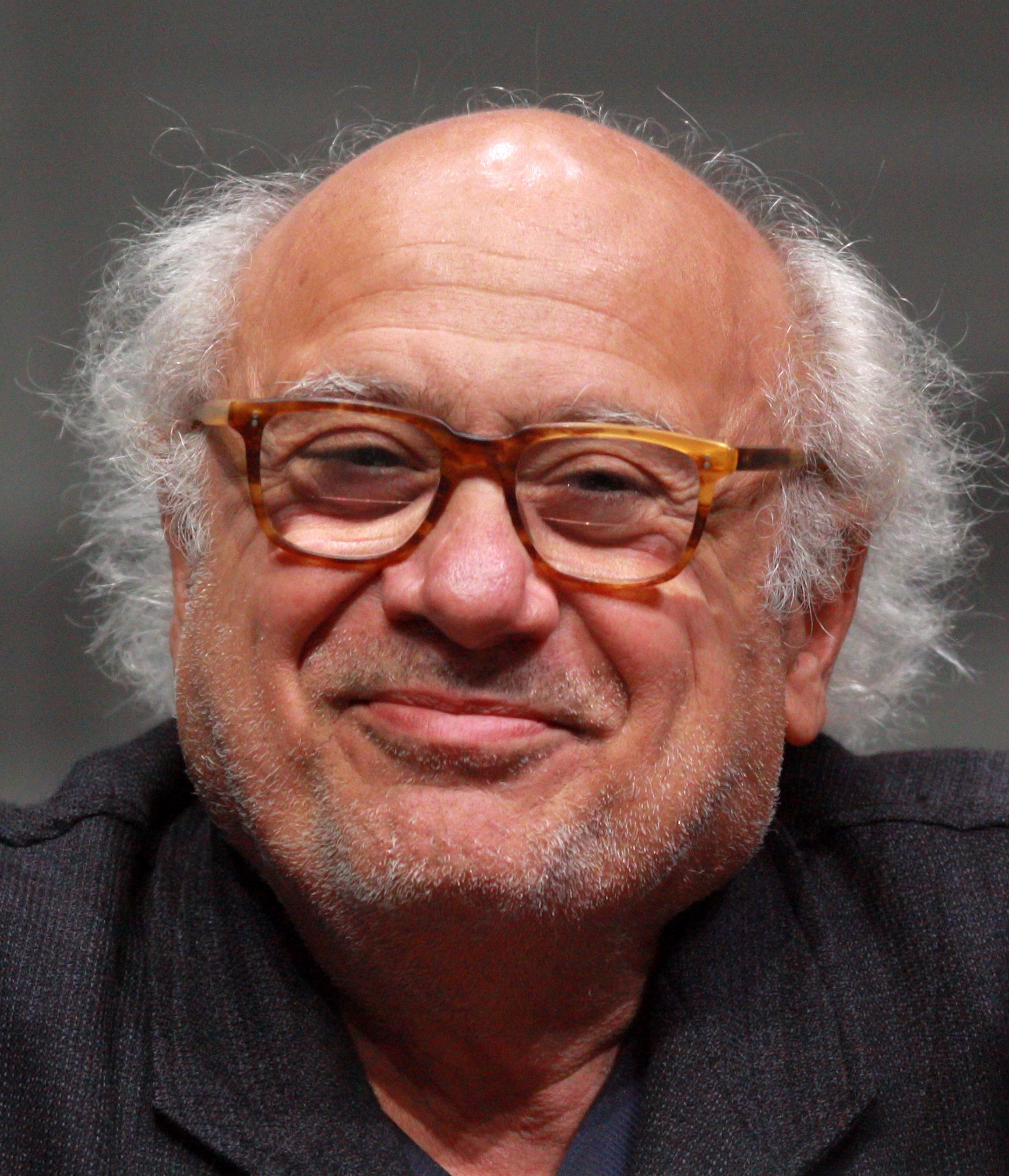
- DeVito in 2013
- Born: Daniel Michael DeVito Jr. November 17, 1944 (age 82); Neptune Township, New Jersey, U.S.
- Education: American Academy of Dramatic Arts (AOS)
- Occupations: Actor; comedian; filmmaker
- Years active: 1969–present
- Works: Full list
- Height: 5 ft 0 in (1.52 m)
- Spouse: Rhea Perlman (m. 1982; sep. 2017)
- Children: 3, including Lucy

Daniel Michael DeVito Jr. (/dəˈviːtoʊ/ də-VEE-toh; born November 17, 1944) is an American actor, comedian and filmmaker. Known for his short stature, raspy voice, distinct accent, and energetic comedy roles, he gained prominence for his portrayal of the taxi dispatcher Louie De Palma in the television series Taxi (1978–1983), which won him a Golden Globe Award and an Emmy Award. Since 2006, DeVito has played Frank Reynolds on the FX/FXX sitcom It's Always Sunny in Philadelphia.

DeVito is known for his film roles in One Flew Over the Cuckoo's Nest (1975), Terms of Endearment (1983), Romancing the Stone (1984), The Jewel of the Nile (1985), Ruthless People (1986), Throw Momma from the Train (1987), Twins (1988), The War of the Roses (1989), Batman Returns (1992), Jack the Bear (1993), Junior (1994), Matilda (1996), L.A. Confidential (1997), The Big Kahuna (1999), Big Fish (2003), Deck the Halls (2006), When in Rome (2010), Wiener-Dog (2016), and Jumanji: The Next Level (2019). He has voiced roles in such films as Disney's Hercules (1997), The Lorax (2012), Smallfoot (2018), and Migration (2023).

In 1991, DeVito and Michael Shamberg founded production company Jersey Films. Soon afterwards, Stacey Sher became an equal partner. The production company is known for films such as Pulp Fiction (1994), Garden State (2004) and Freedom Writers (2007). He would later create a second production company, Jersey Films 2nd Avenue, with his daughter, Lucy, and son, Jake. DeVito also owned Jersey Television, which produced the Comedy Central series Reno 911!. DeVito and wife Rhea Perlman starred together in his 1996 film Matilda, based on Roald Dahl's children's novel. DeVito was also one of the producers nominated for an Academy Award for Best Picture for Erin Brockovich (2000).

From 2012 to 2013, DeVito played Willie Clark in the West End revival of Neil Simon's The Sunshine Boys. He made his Broadway debut as Gregory Solomon in the revival of Arthur Miller's The Price (2017), earning a Tony Award nomination for his performance. He returned to Broadway in the Theresa Rebeck play I Need That (2023).

== Early life and education ==
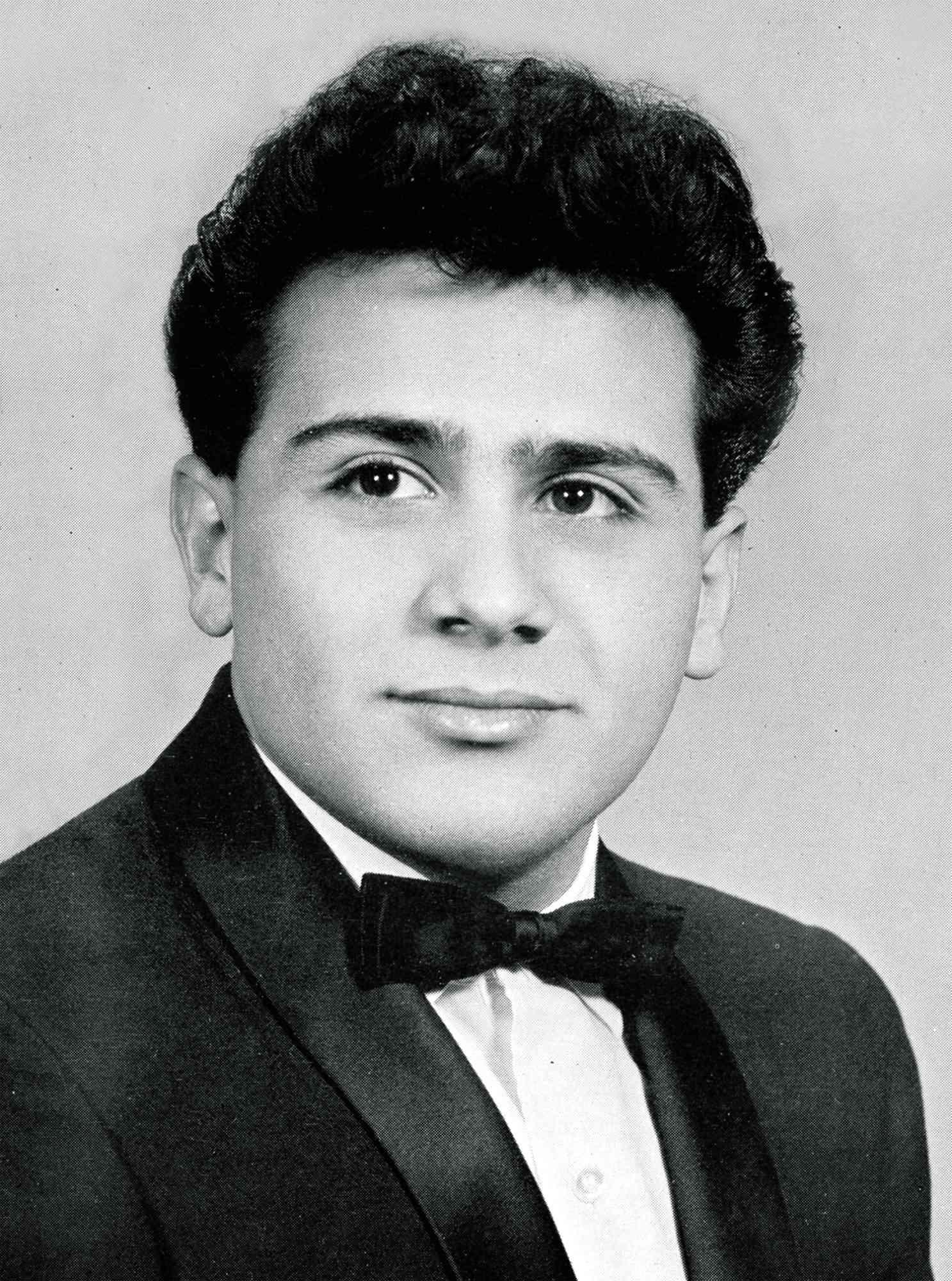
DeVito at Oratory Preparatory School, 1962

DeVito was born at Raleigh Fitkin-Paul Morgan Memorial Hospital in Neptune Township, New Jersey. He is the son of Daniel DeVito Sr., a small business owner, and his wife Julia (née Moccello). He grew up in a family of five, with his parents and two older sisters. He is of Southern Italian descent; his family is originally from San Fele, Basilicata, as well as from the Italo-Albanian community of Calabria. He was raised in Asbury Park, New Jersey. He lived a few miles away from the original Jersey Mike's location and would eat there frequently, which would inspire him to become the sub shop's first celebrity spokesman in a line of commercials that began airing in September 2022.

DeVito was raised as a Catholic. When he was 14, he persuaded his father to send him to boarding school to "keep him out of trouble", and graduated from Oratory Preparatory School in Summit, New Jersey, in 1962. While working as a beautician at his sister's salon, his search for a professional makeup instructor led him to the American Academy of Dramatic Arts (AADA), where he graduated in 1966. In his early theater days, he performed with the Colonnades Theater Lab at the Eugene O'Neill Theater Center in Waterford, Connecticut. Along with his future wife, Rhea Perlman, he appeared in plays produced by the Westbeth Playwrights Feminist Collective.

== Career ==
=== Beautician ===
Before he became an actor, Danny DeVito worked as a beautician at his sister's salon in New Jersey. When a client of his died, her family asked him to do her hair for her funeral, and he subsequently became a part-time morgue cosmetologist, styling the hair of the deceased.

=== Acting ===
DeVito started his career acting off-Broadway in the plays Shoot Anything With Hair That Moves and The Man with the Flower in His Mouth both in 1969. DeVito played Martini in the 1975 film One Flew Over the Cuckoo's Nest directed by Milos Forman, reprising his role from the 1971 off-Broadway play of the same title. He had his feature film debut in the drama Dreams of Glass (1970). Early film roles include Lady Liberty (1971), Hurry Up, or I'll Be 30 (1973) and Deadly Hero (1975).

In 1977, DeVito played the role of John "John John the Apple" DeAppoliso in the Starsky & Hutch episode "The Collector". DeVito gained fame in 1978 playing Louie De Palma, the short but domineering dispatcher for the fictional Sunshine Cab Company, on the hit TV show Taxi. For his performance, he received a Primetime Emmy Award for Outstanding Supporting Actor in a Comedy Series and Golden Globe Award for Best Supporting Actor – Series, Miniseries or Television Film. He got the role by astonishing the show's creators during the audition when asking them "Who wrote this shit?" then throwing the script on the table.

After his breakthrough on the sitcom Taxi, DeVito devoted more effort to a growing successful film career. He took a supporting role as Vernon Dalhart in the James L. Brooks directed comedy-drama Terms of Endearment (1983) acting alongside Shirley MacLaine, Debra Winger and Jack Nicholson. The film earned critical acclaim as well as the Academy Award for Best Picture.

The following year, he acted in the crime comedy Johnny Dangerously (1984) and took the role as the comic rogue Ralph in the romantic adventure Romancing the Stone (1984), starring Michael Douglas and Kathleen Turner; and its sequel, The Jewel of the Nile (1985). In 1986, DeVito starred in Ruthless People with Bette Midler and Judge Reinhold and also voiced the character Grundle King in My Little Pony: The Movie. In 1987, he acted in director Barry Levinson's Tin Men, as a rival salesman to Richard Dreyfuss' character. DeVito also acted opposite Arnold Schwarzenegger in the comedies Twins (1988) and Junior (1994).

In 1990, he and Rhea Perlman played the couple Vic and Paula, commenting on the state of the environment in The Earth Day Special. The following year, he played Lawrence ("Larry the Liquidator") Garfield in Other People's Money (1991) with Gregory Peck. In 1991 and 1992, DeVito voiced Herb Powell in The Simpsons episodes "Brother, Can You Spare Two Dimes?" and "Oh Brother, Where Art Thou?". In 1992, he portrayed the villain Oswald Cobblepot / The Penguin in director Tim Burton's Batman Returns acting opposite Michael Keaton, Michelle Pfeiffer and Christopher Walken. That same year, he directed and produced the biographical drama film Hoffa starring Jack Nicholson. He also acted in the film, portraying Bobby Ciaro. In 1993, he played a single father in the comedy-drama film Jack the Bear.

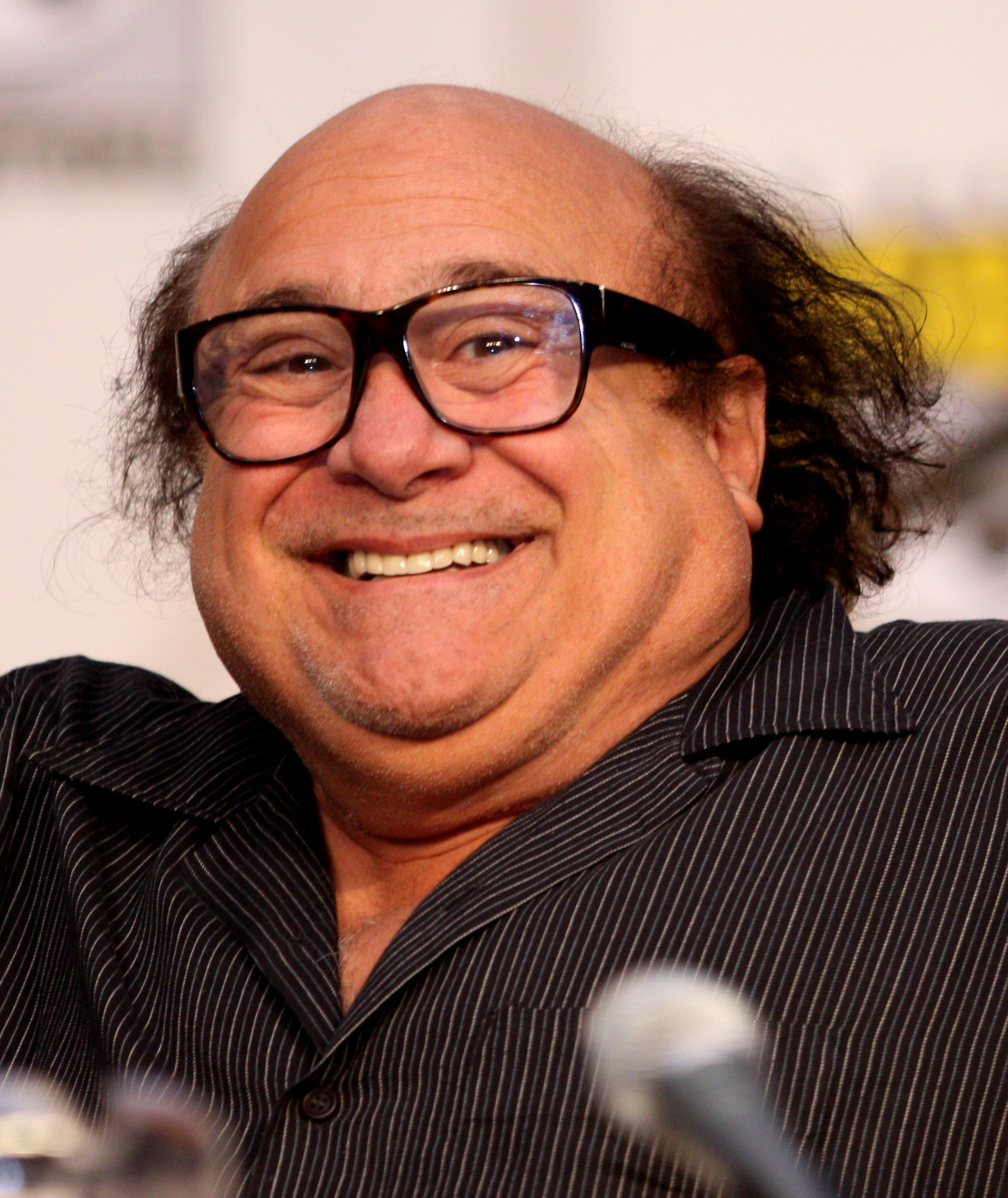
DeVito at San Diego Comic-Con in July 2010

In 1995, DeVito appeared in the gangster comedy Get Shorty. In 1996, he took supporting roles as Swackhammer in the Looney Tunes live-action/animated sports comedy Space Jam and reunited with Tim Burton's science fiction comedy Mars Attacks! starring Jack Nicholson, Glenn Close, Annette Bening, Pierce Brosnan, Martin Short and Natalie Portman.

In 1997, he played Deck Shifflet in the legal thriller The Rainmaker starring Matt Damon and Claire Danes as well as Sid Hudgens, editor of a sleazy tabloid called Hush-Hush, who gets tips ahead of time of celebrity arrests in the neo-noir thriller L.A. Confidential with Russell Crowe, Guy Pearce and Kevin Spacey, the latter of which was nominated for nine Oscars, including the Academy Award for Best Picture. That same year, he also voiced Phil in the Walt Disney animated film Hercules (1997). Leonard Klady of Variety praised the voice performances, writing, "As in Aladdin, the melding of character animation with the screen personae of the actors voicing the roles provides forceful and amusing entertainment, particularly in DeVito's turn as a physical trainer and the acid wit James Woods brings to his villainous role."

He starred in Living Out Loud (1998) alongside Helen Hunt and Queen Latifah, reunited with Kevin Spacey in The Big Kahuna (1999), and hosted the last Saturday Night Live episode before the year 2000. In 1999, he produced and co-starred in the biographical drama film Man on the Moon, a film about the unusual life of his former Taxi co-star Andy Kaufman, played in the film by Jim Carrey. He also played Dr. Hornicker in the Sofia Coppola directed The Virgin Suicides (1999), starring Kirsten Dunst. He continued to take roles in comedy films such as Drowning Mona (2000), Screwed (2000), What's the Worst That Could Happen? (2001), Austin Powers in Goldmember (2002), Anything Else (2003), and Be Cool (2005). He also acted in the drama films Heist (2001) and Big Fish (2003). He earned a 2004 Primetime Emmy Award for Outstanding Guest Actor in a Comedy Series nomination for his role of a stripper in the NBC sitcom Friends.

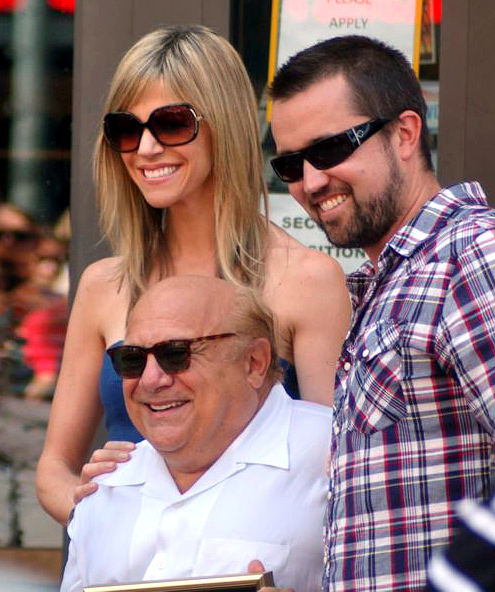
DeVito with It's Always Sunny in Philadelphia castmates Kaitlin Olson and Rob McElhenney at the Hollywood Walk of Fame ceremony for DeVito on August 18, 2011

In 2006, he joined the cast of the FX/FXX sitcom It's Always Sunny in Philadelphia as Frank Reynolds. DeVito stars opposite Glenn Howerton, Rob McElhenney, Kaitlin Olson, and Charlie Day. The character of Frank is introduced at the beginning of Season 2. He received a nomination for the Satellite Award for Best Actor – Musical or Comedy Series. He would also receive the Critics’ Choice Television Icon Award for the role in 2011. DeVito said of the show "I loved it. It was fucking outrageous just the way they are. I immediately said, 'Yeah, this is an amazing show.'" Also in 2006, he starred opposite Matthew Broderick in the Christmas comedy film Deck the Halls.

DeVito has an interest in documentaries. In 2006, he began a partnership with Morgan Freeman's company ClickStar, for whom he hosts the documentary channel Jersey Docs. He was also interviewed in the documentary Revenge of the Electric Car (2011), discussing his interest in and ownership of electric vehicles. In 2010, DeVito appeared in the romantic comedy When in Rome. In 2011, he received a star on the Hollywood Walk of Fame for his work in television. In 2012, he voiced the title character in the animated version of Dr. Seuss's The Lorax. He appeared in the Angry Birds Friends "Champions for Earth" tournament advertisement in September 2015. Following the Japanese release of the Nintendo 3DS game Detective Pikachu, dedicated Pokémon fans submitted a 40,000-signature petition requesting that DeVito be the English voice actor for the title character. However, he declined to audition for the role, commenting that he was unfamiliar with the franchise.

In April 2012, DeVito made his West End acting debut in a revival of the Neil Simon play The Sunshine Boys as Willie Clark, alongside Richard Griffiths. It previewed at the Savoy Theatre in London from April 27, 2012, opened on May 17, and played a limited 12-week season until July 28. DeVito played a fictional version of himself in the music video of One Direction's song "Steal My Girl" (2014). He also appeared in the short film Curmudgeons, which he also produced and directed. In 2013, he would voice Herb for a third time in The Simpsons episode "The Changing of the Guardian". DeVito made his Broadway debut in a Roundabout Theatre Company revival of the Arthur Miller play The Price as Gregory Solomon. He acted opposite Mark Ruffalo and Tony Shalhoub. Marilyn Stasio of Variety praised DeVito's performance writing, "DeVito, who holds the audience in the palm of his hand, tends to favor the comic side, making an extended meal out of an egg-eating visual gag. But he also draws on down-to-earth Jewish wisdom to keep family hostilities from boiling over and spoiling the financial negotiations". He went on to be nominated for a Tony Award for Best Featured Actor in a Play. The production began preview performances at the American Airlines Theatre on February 16, 2017, and opened on March 16 for a limited run-through on May 7.

In 2016, DeVito appeared as part of the ensemble cast of Todd Solondz's anthology film Wiener-Dog. In 2018, he had a guest starring role in the Netflix comedy series The Kominsky Method, acting opposite Michael Douglas and Alan Arkin. He also voiced Dorgle in the Warner Bros. animated film Smallfoot (2018). In 2019, he reunited with Tim Burton, playing Max Medici in the live-action Walt Disney Studios Motion Pictures Dumbo, a remake of the 1941 animated film. He acted alongside Colin Farrell, Michael Keaton and Eva Green. He also played Eddie Gilpin in the action comedy film Jumanji: The Next Level starring Dwayne Johnson, Kevin Hart, Jack Black and Karen Gillan. The film was a box office and critical success. In 2020, he voiced Bob, a stray dog in The One and Only Ivan. In 2021, he played Charlie Goldman the biographical HBO drama film The Survivor. That same year, DeVito wrote a 12-page story centered on the Penguin and Catwoman for the anthology comic Gotham City Villains. In 2023, he acted in the Disney horror comedy Haunted Mansion, Chris Pine's directorial film debut Poolman, and the Illumination animated film Migration. Also in 2023, he returned to Broadway in the Theresa Rebeck play I Need That.

=== Directing ===
DeVito has directed eight short films between 1973 and 2016, five of which were released across 2010 and 2011. These are The Sound Sleeper (1973), Minestrone (1975), Oh Those Lips (2010), Evil Eye (2010), Poison Tongue (2011), Skin Deep (2011), Nest of Vipers (2011), and Curmudgeons (2016).

DeVito made his directorial debut in 1984 with The Ratings Game. In 1986, he directed and starred in the black comedy "The Wedding Ring", a season 2 episode of Steven Spielberg's anthology series Amazing Stories, where his character acquires an engagement ring for his wife (played by DeVito's real-life wife, actress Rhea Perlman). When the ring is slipped on his wife's finger, she is possessed by the ring's former owner, a murderous black widow. In 1987, he made his feature-directing debut with the dark comedy Throw Momma from the Train, in which he starred with Billy Crystal and Anne Ramsey. For his performance, he earned a Golden Globe Award for Best Actor – Motion Picture Musical or Comedy nomination.

DeVito reunited with Jewel of the Nile co-stars Michael Douglas and Kathleen Turner in 1989 when he directed and starred alongside them in The War of the Roses. In 1993, it was indicated in Variety that Russell Myers' cartoon strip Broom-Hilda would be turned into a live action film directed by DeVito and starring his wife Rhea Perlman as the titular Broom-Hilda. Producer Ernest Chambers purchased the rights to the character and hoped to cast Walter Matthau in the film as well. It was never made.

In 1996, he directed Matilda (1996), a film adaptation of Roald Dahl's 1988 classic children's novel of the same name. He also served as the Narrator and played the villainous used-car dealer father Harry Wormwood opposite Perlman. Critic Roger Ebert of The Chicago Sun-Times wrote, "There is never a moment (except toward the happy ending) that we sense DeVito is anything other than quite serious about this material. He goes with Dahl's macabre vision." The following year, he was in talks to direct the crime drama The Little Things with Robert De Niro at that time set to star, and The Crowded Room with Leonardo DiCaprio. Both projects were eventually realized in the 2020s, but without DeVito's involvement.

In 1997, DeVito was in talks for a $13-million deal to both star in and direct Mystery Men, but negotiations broke down over who would produce the soundtrack. "It was a big deal for me," DeVito said. "I really wanted it, so I walked away from the project."

In 1998, he committed to star in and direct both the sci-fi film Barthe for TriStar, about an alien who falls in love, and a remake of The Man Who Came to Dinner for DreamWorks. In 1999, DeVito was attached to star, direct, and produce Jason Keller's spec script Sugar's Sweet Science of Bruising for New Line Cinema.

For the next two years, DeVito was attached to film Michael Petroni's Revelations, a "supernatural religious thriller" that was to have starred George Clooney, but the project was delayed due to rewrites. DeVito was also at one time attached to direct How to Lose a Guy in 10 Days (2003). He instead resurfaced with Death to Smoochy (2002) and Duplex (2003), which were made back-to-back. Before the release of the latter, DeVito agreed to direct a remake of 1942's I Married a Witch for Tom Cruise and Columbia Pictures, announcing to Variety that he hoped to begin production by the end of the year.

Instead of I Married a Witch, he sought to make Trump vs. Wynn as his next directorial project after receiving an offer from HBO. Written by Rick Cleveland, the script chronicles business tycoons Donald Trump and Steve Wynn's competition to build a casino in Atlantic City. DeVito was expected to direct, produce, and star in an unspecified role, but he dropped out after meeting with both figures, who protested the film's production.

He directed the pilot episode for a proposed 2005 Imagine TV sitcom Queen B, which was not picked up by the network for series.

In 2009, it was reported that DeVito would direct and produce the biopic Crazy Eddie, based on the life of consumer electronics king Eddie Antar, with a script by Peter Steinfeld. However, the film could not be made due to a life rights deal that was made with Antar. Instead, he pivoted to making the apocalyptic horror thriller St. Sebastian, which completed post-production in 2012 but was not released. DeVito also worked on the independently financed Honeymoon with Dad, a comedy that never went into production.

DeVito wrote a film adaptation of and, since 2008, was attached to direct The True Confessions of Charlotte Doyle with Morgan Freeman, Pierce Brosnan, and Saoirse Ronan starring. Production was halted when Freeman was seriously injured in a car accident two weeks before filming was scheduled to start. DeVito returned to the subject in February 2013, saying he was looking for another actress to star in the title role and scouting movie locations in Ireland. Production was expected to restart in July 2014. The release date is still classified as "TBD" without new information as to whether it will be shot.

In 2023, a sequel to DeVito's Throw Momma from the Train, entitled Throw Poppa from the Train, was announced to be in the works, with DeVito and Billy Crystal both set to reprise their roles and DeVito presumably returning to direct.

In a 2026 interview with SFGate, DeVito revealed that he wanted to return behind the camera and direct one more film; specifically the 1899 novel McTeague, by Frank Norris, which he called a "powerful, powerful book" and said was very close to happening. He went on to compare the scope of the story, which inspired the 1924 silent film Greed, to There Will Be Blood. "We'd have to make the city look like it did at the turn of the century," added DeVito. "A lot of that would be movie magic. But I would go to San Francisco and try to shoot on Polk Street."

=== Producing ===
DeVito founded Jersey Films in 1991, producing films like Hoffa (1992), Pulp Fiction (1994), Get Shorty (1995), Erin Brockovich (2000)—for which he received an Academy Award nomination for Best Picture—Gattaca (1997), and Garden State (2004).

DeVito also produced the Comedy Central series Reno 911!, the film spin-off Reno 911!: Miami, and the revival on Quibi.

In 2019, his company Jersey Films optioned the screen rights to make a film of Toms River: A Story of Science and Salvation, by Dan Fagin.

He would later create a second film and television production company, Jersey Films 2nd Avenue, with his daughter, Lucy, and son, Jake. The company has produced the animated television series Little Demon and upcoming thriller comedy film Drag (2026).

== Personal life ==
DeVito stands at 5 ft 0 in (1.52 m) tall. His short stature is the result of multiple epiphyseal dysplasia (MED or Fairbank's disease), a rare genetic disorder that affects bone growth.

DeVito with Rhea Perlman in 2006

On January 17, 1971, DeVito met Rhea Perlman when she went to see a friend in the single performance of the play The Shrinking Bride, which also featured DeVito. They moved in together two weeks later and married on January 28, 1982. They have three children: Lucy, Grace, and Jacob.

Perlman and DeVito have acted together several times, including in the television show Taxi and the feature film Matilda (in which they played Matilda's parents). They separated in October 2012, after 30 years of marriage and over 40 years together, then reconciled in March 2013. They separated for a second time in March 2017, but remained on amicable terms. Perlman stated they had no intent of filing for divorce. In 2019, Perlman told interviewer Andy Cohen that she and DeVito have become closer friends after their separation than they were in their final years as a couple.

DeVito and Perlman had resided in a 14,579-square-foot (1,354 m^{2}) house in Beverly Hills, California, that they purchased in 1994; they sold the property for US$28 million in April 2015. They still own a bungalow near Rodeo Drive in Beverly Hills and a multi-residence compound on Broad Beach in Malibu. They also frequented a home they owned in Interlaken, New Jersey, to get away from Los Angeles.

DeVito has mentioned being a big fan of singer Mike Patton's various musical projects, being introduced to his work through his son Jacob in 2005. DeVito collaborated with Patton on a music video and has attended several of his concerts, with Perlman contributing an introductory voiceover to an album by Mr. Bungle, one of Patton's bands. In 2016, DeVito also included music from Patton's band Faith No More on It's Always Sunny in Philadelphia.

=== Political views ===
DeVito is a Democrat and supported Bernie Sanders as a potential presidential candidate to beat Donald Trump. He also endorsed the British Labour Party leader Jeremy Corbyn for the 2017 United Kingdom general election.

== Acting credits and accolades ==
DeVito has an extensive film career, dating back to the early 1970s.

Selected works:

- One Flew over the Cuckoo's Nest (1975)
- Taxi (1978–1983)
- Terms of Endearment (1983)
- Romancing the Stone (1984)
- The Jewel of the Nile (1985)
- Ruthless People (1986)
- Tin Men (1987)
- Throw Momma from the Train (1987) (+ director)
- Twins (1988)
- The War of the Roses (1989) (+ director)
- Batman Returns (1992)
- Hoffa (1992) (+ director & producer)
- Jack the Bear (1993)
- Look Who's Talking Now! (1993)
- Reality Bites (1994) (producer only)
- Junior (1994)
- Renaissance Man (1994)
- Get Shorty (1995) (+ producer)
- Sunset Park (1996) (producer only)
- Matilda (1996) (+ director & producer)
- Space Jam (1996)
- Mars Attacks! (1996)
- The Rainmaker (1997)
- L.A. Confidential (1997)
- Hercules (1997)
- Gattaca (1997)
- Out of Sight (1998) (producer only)
- Living Out Loud (1998) (+ producer)
- Man on the Moon (1999) (+ producer)
- The Virgin Suicides (1999)
- Drowning Mona (2000) (+ producer)
- Erin Brockovich (2000) (producer only)
- What's the Worst That Could Happen? (2001)
- How High (2001) (producer only)
- Death to Smoochy (2002) (+ director)
- Anything Else (2003)
- Big Fish (2003)
- Be Cool (2005) (+ producer)
- Deck the Halls (2006)
- It's Always Sunny in Philadelphia (2006–present)
- Solitary Man (2009)
- The Lorax (2012)
- Wiener-Dog (2016)
- The Comedian (2016)
- Smallfoot (2018)
- Dumbo (2019)
- Jumanji: The Next Level (2019)
- Haunted Mansion (2023)
- Migration (2023)
- Beetlejuice Beetlejuice (2024)
- Jumanji: Open World (2026)
