= List of awards and nominations received by Quentin Tarantino =

Quentin Tarantino awards and nominations
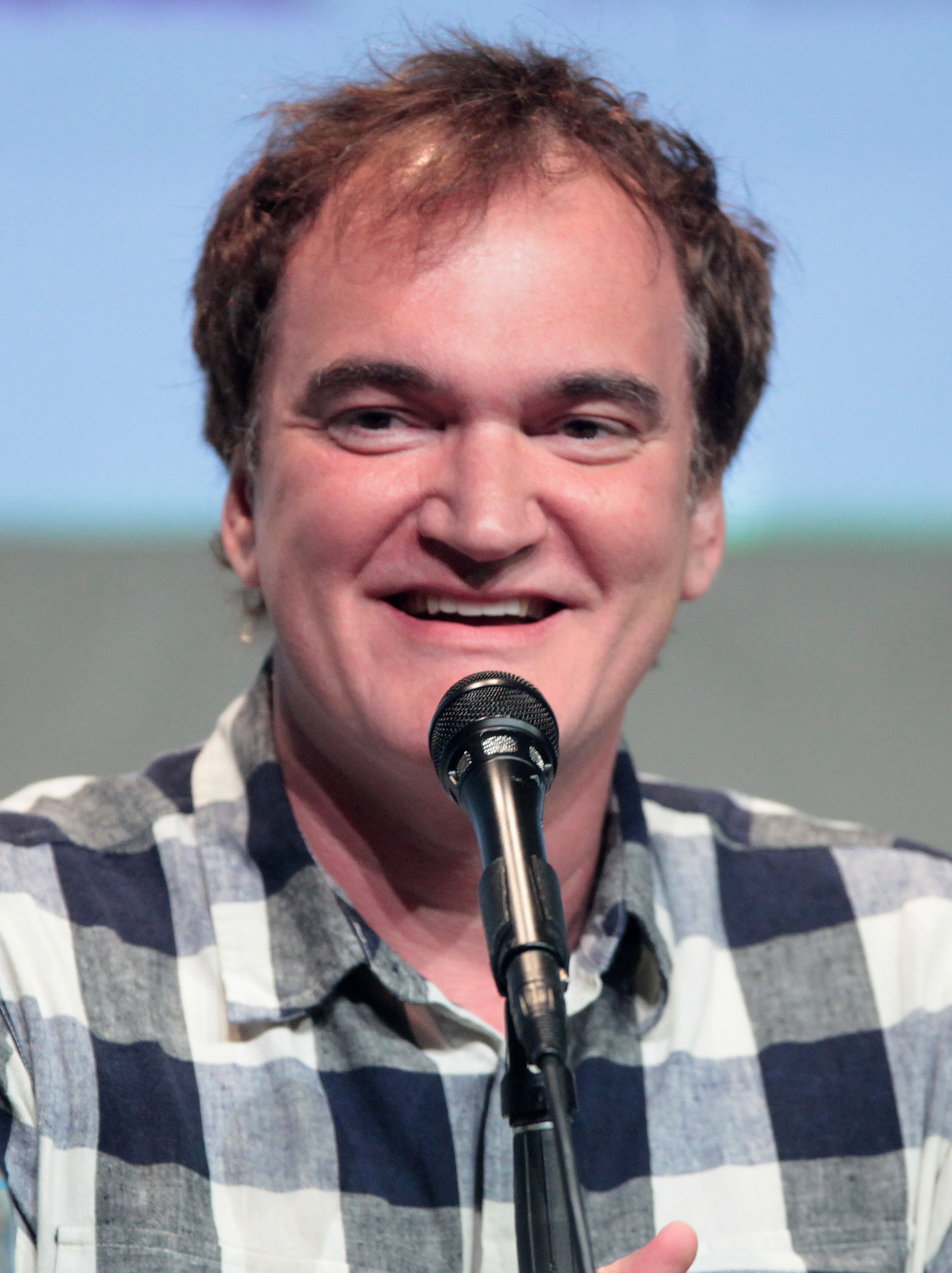
- Tarantino at the 2015 San Diego Comic-Con
Awards and nominations
Award	Wins	Nominations
Academy Awards	2	8
British Academy Film Awards	2	10
Cannes Film Festival Awards	1	4
Critics' Choice Movie Awards	4	7
Emmy Awards	0	1
Golden Globe Awards	3	9
Grammy Awards	0	5
Independent Spirit Awards	2	4

Totals (Note: Certain award groups do not simply award one winner. They acknowledge several different recipients, have runners-up, and have third place. Since this is a specific recognition and is different from losing an award, runner-up mentions are considered wins in this award tally. For simplification and to avoid errors, each award in this list has been presumed to have had a prior nomination.)
- Wins: 35
- Nominations: 88

The following article is a List of awards and nominations received by Quentin Tarantino.

Quentin Tarantino is an American filmmaker, actor, and author. Over his career he has received numerous accolades including two Academy Awards, three British Academy Film Awards, three Golden Globe Awards, a Cannes Film Festival Award, four Critics' Choice Movie Awards, and two Independent Spirit Awards as well as nominations for a Primetime Emmy Award and five Grammy Awards.

For his work on the independent crime thriller Pulp Fiction (1994), Tarantino received the Cannes Film Festival's Palme d'Or. It went on to win his first Academy Award—for Academy Award for Best Original Screenplay—the BAFTA Award for Best Original Screenplay, and the Golden Globe Award for Best Screenplay. The film also received Academy Award nominations for Best Picture and Best Director. While Pulp Fiction was nominated for Best Picture, Tarantino wasn't a listed producer. For the war film Inglourious Basterds (2009), he received Academy Award nominations for Best Director and Best Original Screenplay. For the revisionist western Django Unchained (2012), he won his second Academy Award, also for Best Original Screenplay. He received his first Best Picture nomination for Once Upon a Time in Hollywood (2019) due to his producer’s credit as well as Best Director and Best Screenplay nominations.

For his work in television, he was nominated for the Primetime Emmy Award for Outstanding Directing for a Drama Series for the CBS crime drama series CSI: Crime Scene Investigation episode "Grave Danger" (2005). He also received nominations for five Grammy Award for Best Compilation Soundtrack for Visual Media for Kill Bill: Volume 1 (2003), Kill Bill: Volume 2 (2004), Inglourious Basterds (2009), Django Unchained (2012), and Once Upon a Time in Hollywood (2019). Tarantino won the Britannia Award for Excellence in Directing in 2012.

== Major associations ==
=== Academy Awards ===
Year	Category	Nominated work	Result	Ref.
1995	Best Director	Pulp Fiction	Nominated	
1995	Best Original Screenplay	Pulp Fiction	Won	
2010	Best Director	Inglourious Basterds	Nominated	
2010	Best Original Screenplay	Inglourious Basterds	Nominated	
2013	Best Original Screenplay	Django Unchained	Won	
2020	Best Picture	Once Upon a Time in Hollywood	Nominated	
2020	Best Director	Once Upon a Time in Hollywood	Nominated	
2020	Best Original Screenplay	Once Upon a Time in Hollywood	Nominated	

=== BAFTA Awards ===
Year	Category	Nominated work	Result	Ref.
British Academy Film Awards
1995	Best Director	Pulp Fiction	Nominated	
1995	Best Original Screenplay	Pulp Fiction	Won	
2010	Best Director	Inglourious Basterds	Nominated	
2010	Best Original Screenplay	Inglourious Basterds	Nominated	
2013	Best Director	Django Unchained	Nominated	
2013	Best Original Screenplay	Django Unchained	Won	
2016	Best Original Screenplay	The Hateful Eight	Nominated	
2020	Best Film	Once Upon a Time in Hollywood	Nominated	
2020	Best Director	Once Upon a Time in Hollywood	Nominated	
2020	Best Original Screenplay	Once Upon a Time in Hollywood	Nominated	
Britannia Awards
2012	Excellence in Directing		Won	

=== Emmy Awards ===
Year	Category	Nominated work	Result	Ref.
Primetime Emmy Awards
2005	Outstanding Directing for a Drama Series	CSI: Crime Scene Investigation (episode "Grave Danger")	Nominated	

=== Grammy Awards ===
Year	Category	Nominated work	Result	Ref.
2003	Best Compilation Soundtrack for Visual Media	Kill Bill: Volume 1	Nominated	
2004	Best Compilation Soundtrack for Visual Media	Kill Bill: Volume 2	Nominated	
2009	Best Compilation Soundtrack for Visual Media	Inglourious Basterds	Nominated	
2013	Best Compilation Soundtrack for Visual Media	Django Unchained	Nominated	
2020	Best Compilation Soundtrack for Visual Media	Once Upon a Time in Hollywood	Nominated	

=== Golden Globe Awards ===
Year	Category	Nominated work	Result	Ref.
1995	Best Director	Pulp Fiction	Nominated	
1995	Best Screenplay	Pulp Fiction	Won	
2010	Best Director	Inglourious Basterds	Nominated	
2010	Best Screenplay	Inglourious Basterds	Nominated	
2013	Best Director	Django Unchained	Nominated	
2013	Best Screenplay	Django Unchained	Won	
2016	Best Screenplay	The Hateful Eight	Nominated	
2020	Best Director	Once Upon a Time in Hollywood	Nominated	
2020	Best Screenplay	Once Upon a Time in Hollywood	Won	

== Critics awards ==
Organizations	Year	Category	Work	Result	Ref.
Critics' Choice Movie Awards	2009	Best Director	Inglourious Basterds	Nominated	
Critics' Choice Movie Awards	2009	Best Original Screenplay	Inglourious Basterds	Won	
Critics' Choice Movie Awards	2012	Best Original Screenplay	Django Unchained	Won	
Critics' Choice Movie Awards	2015	Best Original Screenplay	The Hateful Eight	Nominated	
Critics' Choice Movie Awards	2019	Best Picture	Once Upon a Time in Hollywood	Won	
Critics' Choice Movie Awards	2019	Best Director	Once Upon a Time in Hollywood	Nominated	
Critics' Choice Movie Awards	2019	Best Original Screenplay	Once Upon a Time in Hollywood	Won	
National Board of Review	1994	Best Film	Pulp Fiction	Won	
National Board of Review	1994	Best Director	Pulp Fiction	Won	
National Board of Review	2015	Best Original Screenplay	The Hateful Eight	Won	
National Board of Review	2019	Best Director	Once Upon a Time in Hollywood	Won	
National Society of Film Critics	1994	Best Film	Pulp Fiction	Won	
National Society of Film Critics	1994	Best Director	Pulp Fiction	Won	
National Society of Film Critics	1994	Best Screenplay	Pulp Fiction	Won	

== Miscellaneous awards ==
Organizations	Year	Category	Work	Result	Ref.
AACTA International Awards	2012	Best Screenplay	Django Unchained	Won	
AACTA International Awards	2019	Best Film	Once Upon a Time in Hollywood	Nominated	
AACTA International Awards	2019	Best Director	Once Upon a Time in Hollywood	Won	
AACTA International Awards	2019	Best Screenplay	Once Upon a Time in Hollywood	Nominated	
Cannes Film Festival	1994	Palme d'Or	Pulp Fiction	Won	
Cannes Film Festival	2007	Palme d'Or	Death Proof	Nominated	
Cannes Film Festival	2009	Palme d'Or	Inglourious Basterds	Nominated	
Cannes Film Festival	2019	Palme d'Or	Once Upon a Time in Hollywood	Nominated	
Capri Hollywood International Film Festival	2015	Best Picture	The Hateful Eight	Won	
Capri Hollywood International Film Festival	2019	Best Director	Once Upon a Time in Hollywood	Won	
Film Independent Spirit Awards	1992	Best First Feature	Reservoir Dogs	Nominated	
Film Independent Spirit Awards	1992	Best Director	Reservoir Dogs	Nominated	
Film Independent Spirit Awards	1994	Best Director	Pulp Fiction	Won	
Film Independent Spirit Awards	1994	Best Screenplay	Pulp Fiction	Won	
Sitges Film Festival	1992	Best Director	Reservoir Dogs	Won	
Sitges Film Festival	1992	Best Screenplay	Reservoir Dogs	Won	
Sitges Film Festival	1996	Time Machine Honorary Award		Won	
Saturn Awards	1993	Best Writing	True Romance	Nominated	
Saturn Awards	1994	Best Action, Adventure or Thriller Film	Pulp Fiction	Won	
Saturn Awards	1994	Best Writing	Pulp Fiction	Nominated	
Saturn Awards	1996	Best Supporting Actor	From Dusk till Dawn	Nominated	
Saturn Awards	1996	Best Writing	From Dusk till Dawn	Nominated	
Saturn Awards	2004	Best Action, Adventure or Thriller Film	Kill Bill: Volume 1	Won	
Saturn Awards	2004	Best Director	Kill Bill: Volume 1	Nominated	
Saturn Awards	2004	Best Writing	Kill Bill: Volume 1	Nominated	
Saturn Awards	2005	Best Action, Adventure or Thriller Film	Kill Bill: Volume 2	Won	
Saturn Awards	2005	Best Director	Kill Bill: Volume 2	Nominated	
Saturn Awards	2005	Best Writing	Kill Bill: Volume 2	Nominated	
Saturn Awards	2008	Best Horror Film	Grindhouse	Won	
Saturn Awards	2010	Best Action, Adventure or Thriller Film	Inglourious Basterds	Won	
Saturn Awards	2010	Best Director	Inglourious Basterds	Nominated	
Saturn Awards	2010	Best Writing	Inglourious Basterds	Nominated	
Saturn Awards	2013	Best Action, Adventure or Thriller Film	Django Unchained	Nominated	
Saturn Awards	2013	Best Writing	Django Unchained	Won	
Saturn Awards	2016	Best Action, Adventure or Thriller Film	The Hateful Eight	Nominated	
Saturn Awards	2021	Best Fantasy Film	Once Upon a Time in Hollywood	Won	
Saturn Awards	2021	Best Director	Once Upon a Time in Hollywood	Won	
Saturn Awards	2021	Best Writing	Once Upon a Time in Hollywood	Won	
Golden Raspberry Awards	1996	Worst Supporting Actor	From Dusk till Dawn	Nominated	
Stinkers Bad Movie Awards	1996	Worst Supporting Actor	From Dusk till Dawn	Nominated	

== Honorary awards ==
Organizations	Year	Notes	Result	Ref.
Empire Awards	2005	Icon of the Decade Award	Honored	
Casting Society of America	2004	Career Achievement Award	Honored	
American Cinema Editors	2007	Golden Eddie Filmmaker Award	Honored	
Malacañan Palace	2007	Lifetime achievement Award	Honored	
Provincetown International Film Festival	2008	Filmmaker on the Edge Award	Honored	
Hungarian Republic	2010	Order of Merit	Honored	
Santa Barbara International Film Festival	2010	Kirk Douglas Award for Excellence	Honored	
Académie des Arts et Techniques du Cinéma	2011	Honorary César	Honored	
Rome Film Festival	2013	Lifetime Achievement Award	Honored	
Lumière Film Festival	2013	Prix Lumière	Honored	
Hollywood Walk of Fame	2015	Motion Picture Star	Honored	

== Directed Academy Award performances ==
Year	Performer	Film	Result
Academy Award for Best Actor
1994	John Travolta	Pulp Fiction	Nominated
2020	Leonardo DiCaprio	Once Upon a Time in Hollywood	Nominated
Academy Award for Best Supporting Actor
1994	Samuel L. Jackson	Pulp Fiction	Nominated
1997	Robert Forster	Jackie Brown	Nominated
2010	Christoph Waltz	Inglourious Basterds	Won
2012	Christoph Waltz	Django Unchained	Won
2020	Brad Pitt	Once Upon a Time in Hollywood	Won
Academy Award for Best Supporting Actress
1994	Uma Thurman	Pulp Fiction	Nominated
2016	Jennifer Jason Leigh	The Hateful Eight	Nominated
