= Frank Gorshin =

American actor and comedian (1933–2005)

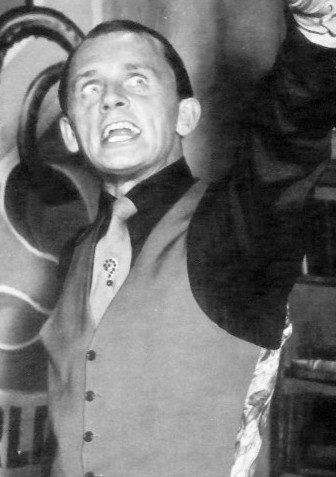
- Gorshin as the Riddler, 1966
- Born: Frank John Gorshin Jr. April 5, 1933; Pittsburgh, Pennsylvania, U.S.
- Died: May 17, 2005 (aged 72); Burbank, California, U.S.
- Resting place: Calvary Catholic Cemetery
- Education: Carnegie Mellon University
- Occupations: Actor; comedian; impressionist
- Years active: 1950–2005
- Spouse: Christina Randazzo (m. 1957)
- Children: 1
- Military service
- Allegiance: United States
- Branch: United States Army
- Service years: 1953–1954

Frank John Gorshin Jr. (April 5, 1933 – May 17, 2005) was an American actor, comedian and impressionist. He made many guest appearances on television variety and talk shows, including The Ed Sullivan Show, Tonight Starring Steve Allen, The Dean Martin Show and Late Night with Conan O'Brien. He was known for his impressions of figures such as Al Jolson, Kirk Douglas, Dean Martin, Bobby Darin, and George Burns.

As an actor, he played the Riddler on the live-action television series Batman and was nominated for an Emmy Award for the performance.

== Early life ==
Gorshin was born on April 5, 1933 (although some sources say 1934), in Pittsburgh, Pennsylvania to a Slovenian-American Catholic family. His mother Frances, a seamstress, immigrated from Novo Mesto, Lower Carniola and his father Frank Gorshin Sr., a railroad worker was a second generation American whose parents came from Lower Carniola. His parents were active in the community, singing in the “Slovenian Singing Society Prešeren” and his mother claimed to be a distant relative of Slovenian national poet France Prešeren.

At the age of 15, he took a part-time job as a cinema usher at the Sheridan Square Theatre. He memorized the mannerisms of the screen stars he saw and created an impressionist act.

He was still in high school, age 17, when he obtained his first paid employment, which he secured as the prize in a Pittsburgh talent contest in 1951: a one-week engagement at Jackie Heller's New York nightclub, Carousel. His parents insisted that he take the engagement, even though his 15-year-old brother had been hit by a car and killed just two nights before.

After graduation from Peabody High School, Gorshin attended the Carnegie Tech School of Drama (now known as Carnegie Mellon University) in Pittsburgh. When not studying, he worked in local plays and nightclubs.

In 1953, Gorshin was drafted into the United States Army and posted to Germany. He served for a year and a half as an entertainer attached to Special Services.

== Career ==
When Gorshin left the Army, he returned to public performance, and in 1956, he became a prolific film actor. He also appeared on various television series, including the role of Hank Butts, with Michael Landon cast as Jim Mason, in the 1958 episode "Shadow of Belle Starr" of the syndicated Western series Frontier Doctor, starring Rex Allen. In 1959, he was cast in three episodes as Seaman Pulaski on Jackie Cooper's CBS military sitcom/drama Hennesey. Thereafter, Gorshin played roles in ABC's crime drama The Untouchables. In 1961, Gorshin gave a tour de force performance as an impressionist who kills his fiancée under the influence of one of his celebrity characters in The Defenders. He guest-starred 12 times on CBS's The Ed Sullivan Show, with his first appearance being on June 17, 1962. He appeared on the show on February 9, 1964, the same night the Beatles and Davy Jones made their debut. In 1963, Gorshin had a guest-starring role in the long-running ABC military series Combat! as Pvt. Wharton who took false credit for the heroism of his dead friend, but redeemed himself later, saving Sgt. Saunders. In another episode in 1965 he played Pvt. Gavin, a tank operator who had washed out of U.S. Army Armor tank operations training.

Gorshin was a popular act at nightclubs, notably those of Las Vegas, where he was the first impressionist to headline the main showrooms. He was also the first impressionist headliner at the Empire Room of New York's Waldorf-Astoria Hotel.

In 1957, he was in a car crash when he fell asleep at the wheel of his car after driving from Pittsburgh for 39 hours without sleep. He was on his way to a Hollywood screen test for the role of Petty Officer Ruby in Run Silent, Run Deep. He sustained a fractured skull and spent four days in a coma; a Los Angeles newspaper incorrectly reported he had been killed. The role went to Don Rickles.

Gorshin's first film role was Between Heaven and Hell. In the late 1950s, Gorshin had roles in B-movies such as Hot Rod Girl (1956), Dragstrip Girl (1957) and Invasion of the Saucer Men (1957). In 1960, he was featured in Bells are Ringing, playing the Method Actor while doing a Marlon Brando impression. As a dramatic actor, he often played "tough guys" like those played by one of his favorite targets of impressions, James Cagney, whom he was said to resemble. He did take a comic turn, though, as the hipster jazz bassist Basil (paired with singer Connie Francis) in Where the Boys Are (1960), as a bumbling kidnapper in the Hayley Mills vehicle That Darn Cat! (1965), and as a boss-behind-bars for laughs in Otto Preminger's comedy Skidoo (1968).

In 1962, Gorshin was cast as Billy Roy Fix in the episode "The Fire Dancer" of the NBC modern Western television series Empire, starring Richard Egan as the rancher Jim Redigo.

From 1966 to 1968, Gorshin played the Riddler on ABC's 1960s live-action television series Batman, starring Adam West and Burt Ward, and was nominated for an Emmy Award (Outstanding Performance by an Actor in a Supporting Role in a Comedy). Gorshin's portrayal of the character included a high-pitched, deranged cackle, inspired by that of Tommy Udo (Richard Widmark) in Kiss of Death (1947). Gorshin disliked the Riddler's original unitard costume from the comics, and had a green business suit and bowler hat marked with question marks created as an alternative, a variant of which would be later adapted in the comics itself. He played the Riddler in ten episodes as well as the 1966 theatrical film, but a pay dispute with ABC prior to season 2 resulted in him being replaced by John Astin for two episodes. The Riddler was seen as Gorshin’s breakthrough role and stated it changed his life as he became more recognizeable. Gorshin was very angry about being replaced by Astin, but he agreed to return in a third-season episode entitled "Ring Around The Riddler". He reprised the role in the 1979 television film Legends of the Superheroes.

Gorshin also had a role in the 1969 Star Trek episode "Let That Be Your Last Battlefield" as the bigoted half-whiteface, half-blackface alien Bele from the planet Cheron. Contrary to popular rumor and several news articles, Gorshin did not receive an Emmy nomination for this role.

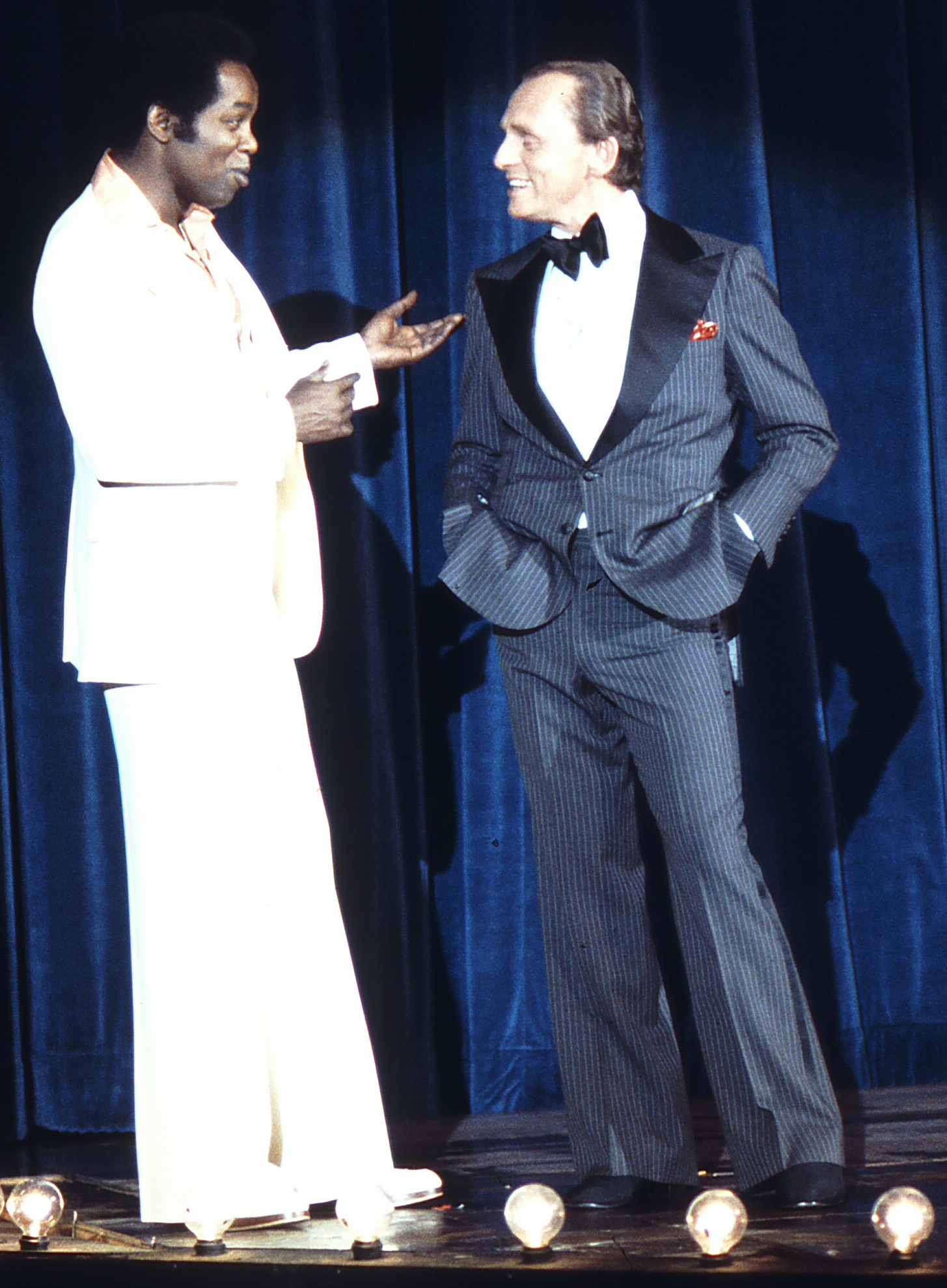
Gorshin performing with Lou Rawls in 1977

In the early 1970s, Gorshin appeared on Broadway in Jimmy (1969) and Guys and Dolls (1971). He made numerous guest-starring appearances on such television series as The Name of the Game (1969) Ironside (1974), Hawaii Five-O (1974), Get Christie Love! (1975), Charlie's Angels (1977) and Wonder Woman (1977). In 1979, he played interplanetary assassin Seton Kellogg in a two-part episode of the television series Buck Rogers in the 25th Century titled "Plot to Kill a City".

In 1982, Gorshin acted and sang the role of irascible King Gama in a TV production of the Gilbert and Sullivan opera Princess Ida, as part of the PBS series The Compleat Gilbert and Sullivan, and subsequently in live performance at other venues.

He also appeared as the villainous Dan Wesker in the miniseries Goliath Awaits (1981); and played the role of Smiley Wilson on the ABC soap opera The Edge of Night (1981–82), where he used his impersonation talents to mimic other performers on the series. During this decade, he also guest starred in episodes of series such as The Fall Guy (1984), Murder, She Wrote (1988) and Monsters (1989).

During the 1990s, he featured as a mobster kingpin in The Meteor Man (1993), played the evil sorcerer Brother Septimus in "The Tale of the Carved Stone" episode of Are You Afraid of the Dark? (1993), voiced the character of Reverend Jack Cheese in an episode of The Ren & Stimpy Show (1995). Notably, he appeared in Terry Gilliam's 12 Monkeys (1995) as the gruff superior to Madeleine Stowe's psychiatrist. Gorshin also provided the voice of Daffy Duck and Foghorn Leghorn in the 1996 Looney Tunes short Superior Duck as well as voicing Foghorn and Yosemite Sam in 1997's Pullet Surprise and From Hare to Eternity, respectively.

In his final years, Gorshin portrayed the famous comedian George Burns on Broadway in the one-man show Say Goodnight, Gracie (2002), which was nominated for a 2003 Tony Award for best play and was reunited with several of his Batman colleagues in the television film Return to the Batcave: The Misadventures of Adam and Burt, in which he appeared as himself. Gorshin died on the day of the telefilm's DVD release. He played the strict legendary Harvard Law School Professor, John H. Keynes, in the Korean drama Love Story in Harvard (2004), and voiced villain Hugo Strange in three 2005 episodes of The Batman animated series. He also voiced the characters Marius and Lysander in the computer role playing game Diablo II.

Gorshin's last television appearance was in "Grave Danger", an episode of the CBS series CSI: Crime Scene Investigation which aired two days after his death; the episode, which was directed by Quentin Tarantino, was dedicated to his memory. While he was known for his impressions, his role on CSI was as himself.

Gorshin's final role was as a voice actor in the unreleased animated feature film Firedog.

== Personal life ==
On April 8, 1957, Gorshin married Christina Randazzo. They had one son, Mitchell, and later separated but remained married until his death.

== Death ==
Gorshin was diagnosed with lung cancer in 2003.His final live appearance was a Memphis performance of Say Goodnight, Gracie, in which he portrayed George Burns. He finished the performance and boarded a plane for Los Angeles on April 25, 2005. After he experienced severe breathing difficulty during the flight, the crew administered emergency oxygen. An ambulance met the plane upon landing and Gorshin was transported to Providence Saint Joseph Medical Center in Burbank where he died three weeks later, on May 17, 2005, at the age of 72 from lung cancer, complicated by emphysema and pneumonia. His family was by his side.

Gorshin is interred at Calvary Catholic Cemetery in the Hazelwood section of Pittsburgh.

== Filmography ==
=== Film ===
Year	Title	Role	Notes
1956	The Proud and Profane	Harry	Uncredited
1956	Hot Rod Girl	Flat Top	
1956	Between Heaven and Hell	Private Millard - Company G	Uncredited
1956	Runaway Daughters	Tommy Burns	
1957	The True Story of Jesse James	Charley Ford	
1957	Dragstrip Girl	Tommy Burns	
1957	The Delicate Delinquent	Wise Guy on Street	Uncredited
1957	Invasion of the Saucer Men	Joe Gruen	
1957	Portland Expose	Joe	
1958	Tank Battalion	PFC 'Skids' Madigan	
1958	Torpedo Run	Sub Crewman	Uncredited
1959	Night of the Quarter Moon	Racist Punk	Uncredited
1959	Warlock	Billy Gannon	Uncredited
1960	Bells are Ringing	Blake Barton	
1960	Studs Lonigan	Kenny Killarney	
1960	The Great Imposter	Barney	
1960	Where the Boys Are	Basil	
1961	Ring of Fire	Frank Henderson	
1961	The George Raft Story	Moxie Cusack	
1961	Sail a Crooked Ship	George M. Wilson	
1965	That Darn Cat!	Iggy	
1966	Ride Beyond Vengeance	Tod Wisdom	
1966	Batman	Edward Nigma / Riddler	
1968	Skidoo	The Man	
1978	Record City	Chameleon	
1981	Underground Aces	Fred Kruger	
1982	The Uppercrust	Harry Werner, alias Nash	
1985	Hot Resort	Mr. Green	
1986	Uphill All the Way	Pike	
1986	Hollywood Vice Squad	Walsh	
1987	The Gnomes' Great Adventure	Holler, Carlo, Omar, Prince Gustav	Voice
1989	Beverly Hills Bodysnatchers	Doc	
1989	Midnight	Ron Saphier	
1989	Singapore Harbor, U.S.A.		
1992	Body Trouble	Johnny Zero	
1992	The Hollywood Beach Murders	Zoran	
1992	Sweet Justice	Billy Joe Rivas	
1993	The Meteor Man	Anthony Beyer (Drug Lord)	
1993	Amore!	Asino	
1994	Hail Caesar	Pete Dewitt	
1994	The Big Story	Cub Reporter, Editor, Older Reporter	Voice, short
1995	12 Monkeys	Dr. Fletcher	
1995	Mr. Payback: An Interactive Movie	Himself	Cameo
1996	Superior Duck	Daffy Duck, Foghorn Leghorn	Voice, short
1997	Pullet Surprise	Foghorn Leghorn	Voice, short
1997	From Hare to Eternity	Yosemite Sam	Voice, short
1997	Bloodmoon	Chief William Hutchins	
1997	Twilight of the Ice Nymphs	Cain Ball	
1997	Threshold		
1997	Better Than Ever	Will	
1997	After the Game (aka The Last Hand)	Benny Walsh	
1997	Guy Maddin: Waiting for Twilight		Documentary
1999	Man of the Century	Roman Navarro	
1999	Final Rinse	Chief	
1999	Game Day	Sam Segal	
1999	The Art of Murder		Uncredited
1999	All Shook Up	Sheriff Dudston	
2000	Luck of the Draw	Sterling Johnson	
2000	Beethoven's 3rd	Uncle Morrie Newton	Video
2000	The Curio Trunk	Harold Belfast	Short
2000	Castle Rock	Mack	
2001	The Rules (For Men)		
2002	High Times' Potluck	The Slim Man	
2002	Manna from Heaven	Ed	
2003	Mail Order Bride	Russian Doctor	
2005	Angels with Angles	George Burns, Shelleen	
2005	The Best of Frank Gorshin	Himself	Video
2006	The Creature of the Sunny Side Up Trailer Park	Burdus	

=== Television ===
Year	Title	Role	Notes
1956	Alfred Hitchcock Presents	Page	Episode: "Decoy"
1957	Navy Log	Captain Ray Duncan	Episode: "Operation Lend Lease Adti: Amscray!"
1957	The Restless Gun	Cowboy with Singer	Episode: "Duel at Lockwood"
1958	The Silent Service	Torpedoman 1st Class Larkin	Episode: "The Thresher Story"
1959	The Millionaire	Hal	Episode: "The Doctor Joseph Frye Story"
1959	Hennesey	Seaman Pulaski, Shore Patrol, USN	3 episodes
1959	The Detectives	Billy McGirth	Episode: "The Streger Affair"
1959	Have Gun – Will Travel	Marty (Bully)	Episode: "Sons of Aaron Murdock"
1959	Frontier Doctor	Hank Butts	Episode: "Shadow of Belle Starr"
1960	Mr. Lucky	Jerry Musco	Episode:"The Last Laugh"
1961	The Defenders	Harry Simms	Episode:"The Hundred Lives of Harry Simms"
1962	Insight	Alessandro Serenelli	Episode: "The Killer"
1962	The Untouchables	Herbie Catcher	Episode: "The Pea"
1963	Combat!	Private Wharton	Episode: "The Medal"
1963	Naked City	Alan Starkie	Episode: "Beyond This Place There Be Dragons"
1964	The Alfred Hitchcock Hour	Lew Rydell	Season 2 Episode 30: "The Second Verdict"
1964	The Regis Philbin Show	Himself	Episode: "Episode #1.23"
1965	Combat!	Private Gavin	Episode: "The Hell Machine"
1966	A Man Called Shenandoah	Otto	Episode: "The Clown"
1966	Password All-Stars	Himself (Celebrity Contestant)	Episode - 11-25-1966
1966	The Munsters	Fair Deal Dan	Episode: "Herman, the Tire Kicker"
1966	The Roger Miller Show	Himself	Episode: "Episode #1.14"
1966	The Danny Kaye Show	Himself	Episode: "Episode #4.11"
1966	The Red Skelton Hour	Nasty McMean	Episode: "What Did You Do in the Dump, Daddy?"
1966	The Dean Martin Show	Himself	Episode: "#2.3 & #2.21"
1966	The Sammy Davis, Jr. Show	Himself	Episode: "Episode #1.11"
1966-1967	Batman	The Riddler	10 episodes (Stunt double was in "The Entrancing Dr. Cassandra
1967	Garrison's Gorillas	Dustin	Episode: "Thieves' Holiday"
1968	The Carol Burnett Show	Himself	Episode: "01-08-1968"
1969	Star Trek	Bele	Episode: "Let That Be Your Last Battlefield"
1969	The High Chaparral	Stinky Flanagan	Episode: "Stinky Flanagan"
1969	The Movie Game	Himself	Episode: "12-9-1969"
1970	The Virginian	Dutch Miley	Episode: "Follow the Leader"
1970	Kraft Music Hall	Himself	Episode: "The Kopykats"
1971	The Interns	Joe Calico	Episode: "The Challenger"
1971	O'Hara, U.S. Treasury	Little Willie	Episode: "Operation: Bribery"
1971	The Merv Griffin Show	Himself	Episode: "Salute to Horror"
1969-1971	Rowan & Martin's Laugh-In	Himself (Guest Performer)	2 episodes
1971-1972	The Hollywood Squares	Guest Appearance	5 episodes
1972	The ABC Comedy Hour (aka The Kopykats)	Himself, regular cast	7 episodes
1974	Dr. Simon Locke	Charlie Kreber	Episode: "Borrowed Trouble"
1974	Ironside	Dorian	Episode: "What's New with Mark?"
1974	Movin' On	Tucker J. Paulsen	Episode: "Good for Laughs"
1974	Hawaii Five-O	Stash	Episode: "Welcome to Our Branch Office"
1975	Sky Heist	Ben Hardings	Television film
1975	S.W.A.T.	Johnny Rizi	Episode: "Ordeal"
1975	Police Woman	David Griffin	Episode: "Glitter with a Bullet"
1975	The Dean Martin Celebrity Roast: Sammy Davis Jr.	Himself	TV special
1975	The Dean Martin Celebrity Roast: Jackie Gleason	Himself	TV special
1976	Rudolph's Shiny New Year	Sir 1023	Voice, television film
1976	Dinah!	Himself	Episode: Episode #2.138"
1977	Charlie's Angels	Harry Dana	Episode: "Angels at Sea"
1977	Wonder Woman	Hoffman, Toyman	Episode: "The Deadly Toys"
1978	Greatest Heroes of the Bible	Ocran	Episode: "The Story of Moses"
1979	Legends of the Superheroes	The Riddler	Episode: "The Challenge"
1979	Death Car on the Freeway	Ralph Chandler	Television film
1979	Buck Rogers in the 25th Century	Seton Kellogg	Episode: "The Plot to Kill a City"
1981	Goliath Awaits	Dan Wesker	Television film
1982	Treasure Island	Ben Gunn	Television film
1982	Princess Ida	King Gama	Television film
1986	A Masterpiece of Murder	Pierre Rudin	Television film
1988	Murder, She Wrote	Arnold Goldman	Episode: "Mourning Among the Wisterias"
1988	The New Hollywood Squares	Guest Appearance	Episode: "5-30-1988"
1988	The Late Show	Himself	Episode: "4-28-1988"
1990	Comic Book Collector	Himself	Documentary short
1994	Are You Afraid of the Dark?	Brother Septimus	Episode: "The Tale of the Carved Stone"
1995	Lois & Clark: The New Adventures of Superman	Sharpie Lawyer a.k.a. Kill, Kill, Kill lawyer	Episode: "Whine, Whine, Whine"
1995	The Ren & Stimpy Show	The Reverend Jack Cheese	Voice, episode: "Reverend Jack Cheese"
1997	Johnny Bravo	Barney Stone, Clovy	Voice, episode: "Blarney Buddies"
1999	The Bold and the Beautiful	George the homeless man	TV Serial
1999	VH-1 Where Are They Now?	Himself	TV series documentary, Episode: "Superheroes"
2000	Biography	Himself	Episode: "Adam West: Behind the Cowl"
2001	Black Scorpion	Benjamin Tickerman, Clockwise	Episode: "Crime Time"
2003	The 57th Annual Tony Awards	Himself	Television special
2003	Return to the Batcave: The Misadventures of Adam and Burt	Himself	Television film
2004	Love Story in Harvard	Professor John Keynes	Television series
2004	Biography	Himself	Episode: "Catwoman: Her Many Lives"
2005	The Batman	Hugo Strange	Voice, 3 episodes
2005	CSI: Crime Scene Investigation	Himself	Episode: "Grave Danger"
2006	Dr. Vegas	Edgar Rhodes	Episode: "For Love or Money"
2006	Dreamweaver	Mr. Rem	Television film

=== Video games ===
Year	Title	Role	Notes
2000	Diablo II	Marius / Lysander	Voice

== Stage appearances ==
- What Makes Sammy Run? playing Sammy Glick at Valley Music Theatre (Los Angeles) (1966)
- Jimmy playing James J. Walker at Winter Garden Theatre (Broadway) (1969)
- The Prisoner of Second Avenue playing Mel Edison at Parker Playhouse (Florida) (1973)
- Whodunnit standing in as Andreas Capodistriou at Biltmore Theatre (Broadway) (1982)
- On the Twentieth Century playing Oscar Jaffe on a tour of the United States (1986)
- Ah, Wilderness! playing Nat Miller at American Heartland Theatre (Kansas City, Mo.) (1987)
- Best of Burlesque, sketch comedy and impressionist, Showboat Dinner Theater, Clearwater, FL (1994)
- Guys and Dolls as a performer in Las Vegas (1995)
- The Sunshine Boys as Willie Clark on a tour of the United States (2001)
- Say Goodnight, Gracie as George Burns at Helen Hayes Theatre (Broadway) (2002)

== Discography ==
- "The Riddler", composed by Mel Torme, B-side "Never Let Her Go" composed by David A. Gates, 1966
