= Willard Morgan =

American performance artist and filmmaker

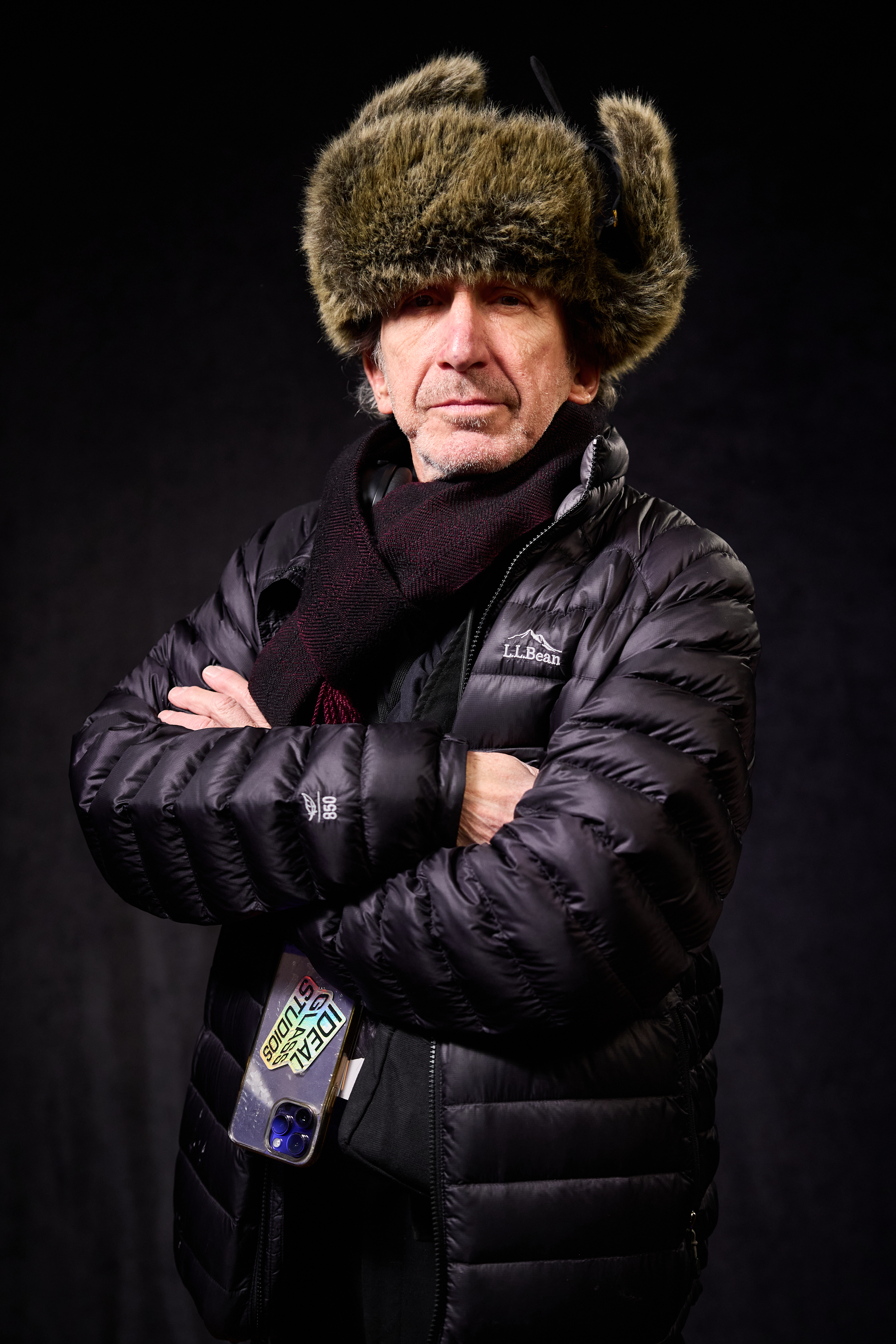
Willard Morgan at the 2024 Sundance Film Festival

Willard Morgan is an American actor, writer, director, filmmaker, and musician based in New York City. He is the founder and artistic director of Ideal Glass Studios in the West Village and the production company Fever Pitch Productions.

Morgan began his career in the 1980s downtown New York comedy and music scene. Over his career, he has appeared in and produced Broadway and off-Broadway theater, feature films, and music videos.

== Early Life and Education ==
Morgan was born in New York to opera singer Sylvia Seid and local doctor, Daniel Morgan. He grew up with an early passion for genre, gothic horror, and dark comedy films, drawing heavy influence from directors Michael Powell and Emeric Pressburger (particularly The Tales of Hoffmann), actor Vincent Price, Ernie Kovacs, John Waters, and Japanese horror (J-Horror) directors such as Takashi Miike, Yoshihiro Nishimura, and Sion Sono.

He completed his undergraduate studies at New York University and trained at the William Esper Studio. He also studied under master theatre practitioners Jacques Lecoq in Paris and Austin Pendleton at HB Studio.

== Career ==
=== Acting and Theater ===
Morgan started as a stand-up comedian and songwriter performing in New York and Los Angeles during the 1980s.

His stage credits include:

- Off-Broadway & Regional: Starring in Say Goodnight, Gracie directed by Austin Pendleton at Playwrights Horizons, Saint Hollywood at the Edinburgh Theatre Festival, and Vestiphobia directed by Steve Fagin at Dixon Place, Fabrica del Arte in Havana, and international fringe fashion festivals.
- Broadway: Co-Produced with Wayne Adams, the Broadway production of The Runner Stumbles by Milan Stitt (later adapted into Stanley Kramer’s final feature film).

=== Music & Performance ===
Morgan is the front man and lyricist of Ideal Orkestra, a collaborative international music project with a highly theatrical style influenced by Gilbert & Sullivan, Saturday Night Live, SCTV, Monty Python, Tim Minchin, and Bo Burnham. He has performed across venues including The Cutting Room, B.B. King's, Highline Ballroom, Regine's, Japan Society (Manhattan), and La Scala in Paris.

He has also written and produced music videos touching on social and environmental themes such as fast fashion and climate change, including Sweatshop Boogie, Days of a Dandy, and Silks & Satins.

=== Film & Production ===
Through his company Fever Pitch Productions, Morgan produces theater, music, and film:

- Jimmy's Reality (1993): Acted in the short film, which was screened at the Sundance Film Festival.
- Festival Fever & Me & Michael: Directed and produced Festival Fever, an award-winning short film that won Best Short at the Florida Film Festival and Fort Lauderdale Film Festival, as well as a comedy film award from Sony. This led to his feature project Me & Michael, documenting his attempt to track down Michael Moore for a film review.
- The Tannery: Produced and starred in The Tannery, a gothic horror thriller about "the mad glover of Hoboken" (in post-production).
- Collection Day: Produced and acted in the feature film directed by Blaine Israel aka Blaine Fuller (in post-production).
- Other Film Credits: Produced Shah Bob and America So Beautiful (directed by Babak Shokrian), and acted in Dawn of the Beast (directed by Bruce Wemple).

== Ideal Glass Studios ==
Morgan is the founder and artistic director of Ideal Glass Studios, an event, film, and theater production facility located in the West Village, New York City.

== Work ==
Stage

- Sweatshop Boogie (2013–present, live performances for fashion week)
- Ideal Orkestra (2012–present, music collaboration)
- Jelvis (2006, the Jewish Elvis - international tour)
- Saint Hollywood (2005, Edinburgh Festival Fringe)

Film

- The Tannery – Director, Writer, Producer, Actor (Post-production)
- Collection Day – Producer, Actor (Post-production)
- The Last Temptation of Becky (2026, Feature)- Actor (Uncredited)
- Dawn of the Beast (2021)
- Me & Michael (2006, documentary feature featuring Michael Moore) - director and producer
- Fever Pitch (2001, short film) winner: Sony Vision Comedy Award at American Film Institute, and Best Short Film at the Central Florida and Ft Lauderdale International Film Festivals - filmmaker
- America So Beautiful (2001, 35mm feature) - co-producer
- Jimmy's Reality (1993, shortest film at the Sundance Film Festival that year, physical bit was copied by Mr. Bean) - talent

Exhibit

- Un-Finished Cuba (2015, photo and video installation)
- Photo group shows: Bedlam Gallery, M.J. Higgins Gallery, Bedlam Warehouse Gallery Downtown (2004-2005)
