= Dawn of the Beast =

2021 horror film directed by Bruce Wemple

- Official release poster
- Directed by: Bruce Wemple
- Written by: Anna Shields
- Produced by: Roger Mayer; Cole Payne
- Starring: Francesca Anderson; Adrián Burke; Chris Cimperman; Ariella Mastroianni; Roger Mayer; Anna Shields; Grant Schumacher; LeJon Woods
- Music by: Nate VanDeusen
- Production companies: 377 Films; Travers Terror
- Distributed by: Uncork'd Entertainment
- Release date: April 6, 2021
- Running time: 82 minutes
- Country: United States
- Language: English

Dawn of the Beast is a 2021 American horror film written by Anna Shields and directed by Bruce Wemple. It stars Francesca Anderson, Adrián Burke, Chris Cimperman, Ariella Mastroianni, Roger Mayer and Anna Shields. The film is about graduate students searching for a bigfoot.

== Plot ==
The film starts with a couple in the forest, the woman receives a green-stoned necklace from her boyfriend. Shortly after, she's mysteriously killed, setting a foreboding tone.

Years later, a group of graduate students, Chris, Isabella, Jake, Lilly, and Oz accompanied by their professor, Dr. Dennis Kasdan, embark on a field trip into the Northeastern wilderness. Their goal is to find evidence of Bigfoot, especially during “Dead Month,” a time notorious for strange creature sightings and unexplained disappearances.

During their expedition, the group discovers a decayed skeleton adorned with a green-stoned necklace, the same as in the opening scene. Isabella secretly takes the necklace, despite concerns that reporting the find would end their trip prematurely.

That night, Isabella ventures out alone and encounters a terrifying creature, leading to her possession by a malevolent force. Simultaneously, Lilly is kidnapped by Everett, a man obsessed with Bigfoot after losing his girlfriend years prior. He uses Lilly as bait, tying her to a tree to lure the creature.

As the night unfolds, the group faces attacks from both Bigfoot and a more sinister entity the Wendigo, a malevolent spirit that preys on those who trespass in its domain. The creatures invade the cabin where the group is staying, leading to a series of gruesome deaths, including that of Professor Kasdan.

Chris and Lilly manage to escape the initial onslaught. Lilly, prioritizing her survival, urges Chris to flee with her. However, Chris chooses to stay and search for other survivors, only to find none. Eventually, he reunites with Lilly, and they attempt to escape together.

Their escape is thwarted when Isabella, now fully possessed, attacks them. A confrontation ensues, resulting in a fiery explosion that seemingly kills Isabella and Everett, who reappears in a zombified state. Chris and Lilly survive, but the traumatic events leave them scarred.

== Cast ==
- Francesca Anderson as Marie
- Adrián Burke as Chris
- Chris Cimperman as Jake
- Ariella Mastroianni as Isabella
- Roger Mayer as Cashier
- Willard Morgan as Dr. Dennis Kasdan
- Anna Shields as Lilly
- Grant Schumacher as Everett
- LeJon Woods as Oz
- J.Louris, JR as Shop Owner
- Shawn Maloy as The Sasquatch

== Production ==
Wemple and the crew designed Dawn of the Beast to resemble "Kind of a monster Gore Fest, classic, you know, seventies, eighties drive-in popcorn flick for everyone." Scriptwriter Anna Shields and Wemple, who helped develop the story, did not want the film to take itself too seriously and "lean into some of those cliches and some of those tropes", comparing the desired result to that of the Evil Dead films.

== Release ==
The film was released in United States on April 6, 2021 by Uncork'd Entertainment digitally and on DVD.

== Reception ==
Critical reception for the film was mixed, with common praise centering on the gore and effects while common criticism focused on Dawn of the Beast's pacing. Phil Wheat of Nerdly rate the film 4 out of 5, praising the film as having "decent gore and SUPERB monster effects". Rue Morgue felt that the movie had a good concept, but took too long to show any action and was "dragged down by its own bloated script". Horror Society was more favorable, writing "Overall, Dawn of the Beast will not be for everyone. In fact, I can see some of you bitching about it but if you are in the mood for something a little different then I would highly recommend this crazy ass movie. You won’t see anything like it for some time."
