= Tony Tarantino =

American actor and film producer (1940–2023)

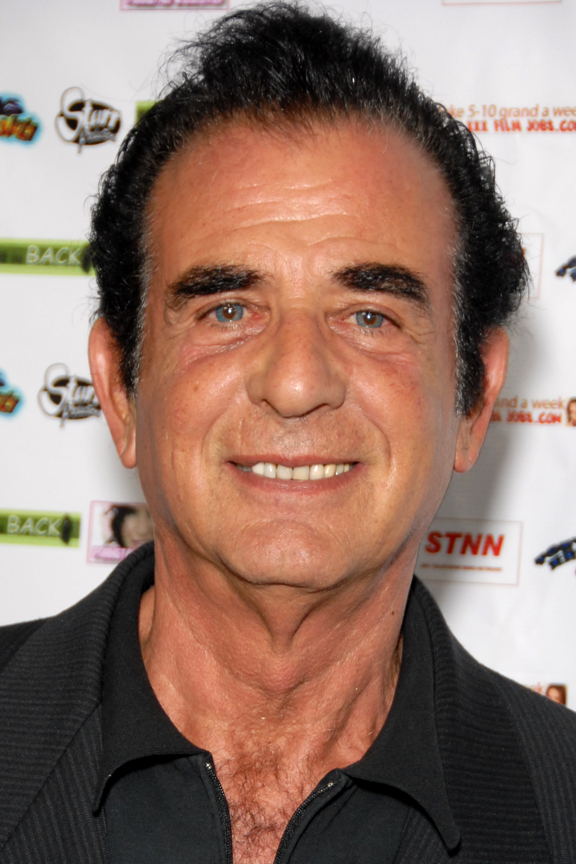
- Tarantino in November 2009
- Born: July 4, 1940; New York City, U.S.
- Died: December 8, 2023 (aged 83); Los Angeles, California, U.S.
- Occupations: Actor; producer
- Spouse: Connie McHugh (divorced)
- Children: Quentin Tarantino

Raymond Anthony Tarantino (/ˌtærənˈtiːnoʊ/ TARR-ən-TEE-noh; July 4, 1940 – December 8, 2023) was an American actor and film producer. He was best known as the father of filmmaker Quentin Tarantino.

== Life and career ==
Tarantino was born in New York City on July 4, 1940, the son of Italian-American parents Elizabeth Jean (née Salvaggio) and Dominic James Tarantino.

Tarantino met Connie McHugh during her trip to Los Angeles; the two were married before they had their only child together, Quentin Tarantino (born 1963), who later became a filmmaker. Tarantino left the family before his son was born. Quentin said in a 2010 interview, "I never knew my father. That's the thing. I never knew him. He wanted to be an actor. Now he's an actor only because he has my last name. But he was never part of my life. I didn't know him. I've never met him." In October 2015, the two were at odds when Quentin received backlash from police unions after speaking at an anti-police brutality rally in New York and said, "I have to call the murderers the murderers." The elder Tarantino responded that he had relatives in the police and that what his son had said was "dead wrong".

Tarantino revealed in 2017 that, when he was 20 years old in 1960, talent agent Henry Willson offered him acting opportunities and a lavish lifestyle in exchange for sex. He says he punched Willson in the face, knocking him to the ground, after which Willson said Tarantino would never work in Hollywood or New York again as an actor. He stated he was thereafter quickly fired from his role on the western television series Dick Powell's Zane Grey Theatre, and used the stage name "Tony Maro" to book several acting jobs with Paramount as an extra, but was fired within two hours once his true identity was discovered. In his later years, he produced films such as Prism and Underbelly Blues.

Tarantino died in Los Angeles on December 8, 2023, at the age of 83.

== Filmography ==
=== As producer ===
Year	Title
2011	Underbelly Blues
2012	Mediterranean Blue

=== As director ===
Year	Title
2003	Blood Money

=== As actor ===
Year	Title
1999	It's the Rage
1999	Family Tree
1999	Holy Hollywood
2003	Blood Money
2008	Harvest Moon
2011	Underbelly Blues
2012	Mediterranean Blue
