= Quentin Tarantino =

American filmmaker (born 1963)

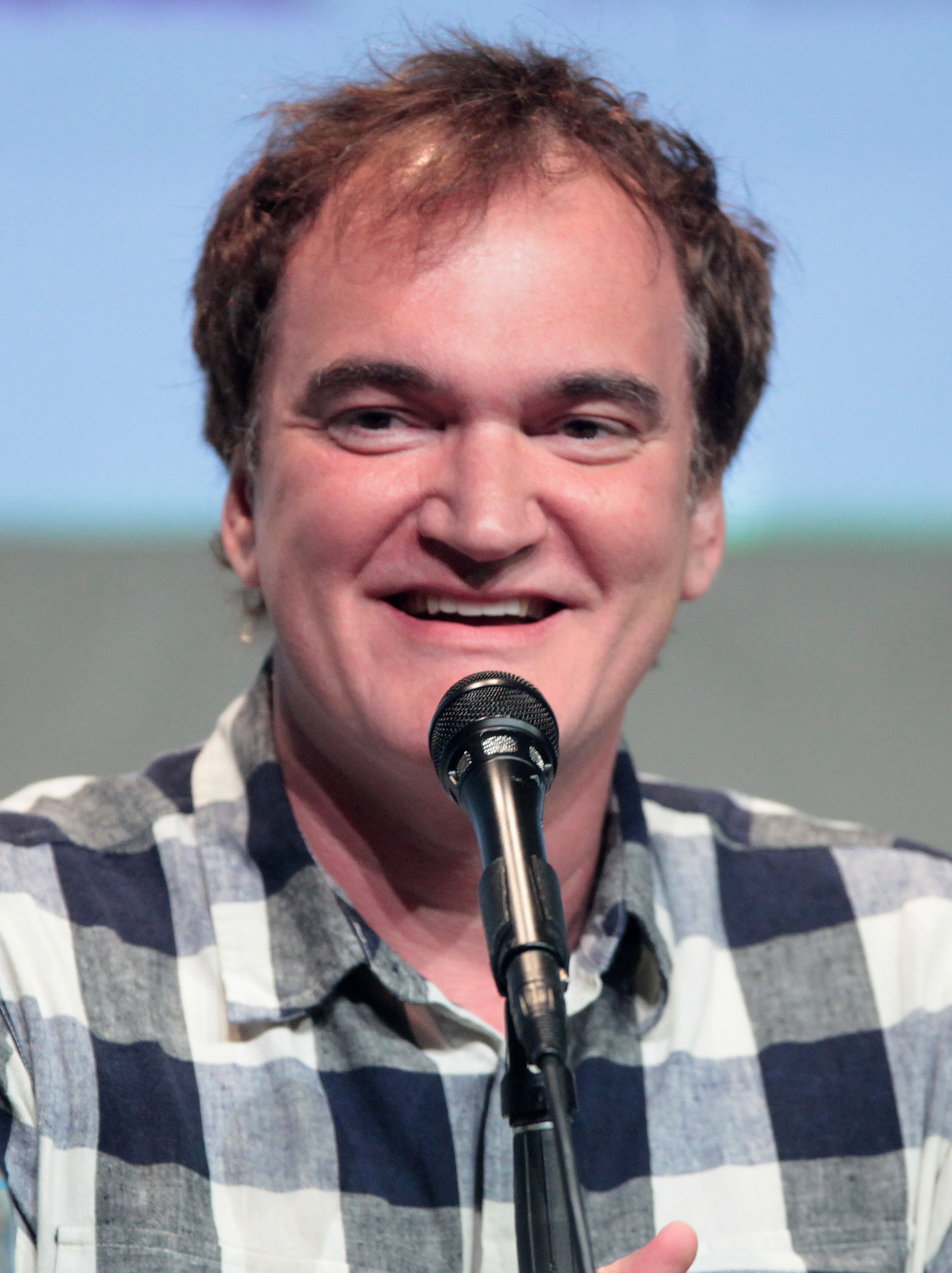
- Tarantino at the 2015 San Diego Comic Con
- Born: Quentin Jerome Tarantino; March 27, 1963 (age 63); Knoxville, Tennessee, US
- Occupations: Director; producer; screenwriter; actor; author
- Years active: 1987–present
- Works: Full list; unrealized projects
- Spouse: Daniella Pick (m. 2018)
- Children: 2
- Father: Tony Tarantino
- Relatives: Svika Pick (father-in-law); Mirit Shem-Ur (mother-in-law)
- Awards: Full list

Quentin Jerome Tarantino (/ˌtærənˈtiːnoʊ/ TARR-ən-TEE-noh; born March 27, 1963) is an American filmmaker, actor, and author. His works are characterized by graphic violence, extended dialogue often featuring much profanity, and references to popular culture. His films have earned a cult following alongside critical and commercial success, and he has been named by some as the most influential director of his generation. Tarantino has received numerous accolades including two Academy Awards, two BAFTA Awards, and four Golden Globe Awards, as well as nominations for a Primetime Emmy Award and five Grammy Awards. His films have collectively grossed more than $1.9 billion worldwide.

Tarantino began his career by having a number of jobs through the 1980s, including writing several screenplays. During that time, he made his directorial debut with the independent crime film Reservoir Dogs (1992), which became an immediate hit. His second film, the crime comedy-drama Pulp Fiction (1994), was a critical and commercial success and received numerous awards, including the Cannes Film Festival's Palme d'Or and Tarantino's first Academy Award, for Best Original Screenplay. The film has been inducted into the National Film Registry by the Library of Congress. Afterward, he wrote and starred in the action horror film From Dusk till Dawn (1996). Tarantino's third film as director, Jackie Brown (1997), paid homage to blaxploitation films.

Subsequently, Tarantino wrote and directed the martial arts films Kill Bill: Volume 1 (2003) and Kill Bill: Volume 2 (2004), with both volumes combined regarded as a single film. He then made the exploitation-slasher film Death Proof (2007), which was part of a double feature with From Dusk till Dawn director Robert Rodriguez, released under the collective title Grindhouse. His sixth film, Inglourious Basterds (2009), followed an alternate account of World War II. He followed this with two Western films: Django Unchained (2012)—a slave revenge Spaghetti Western which won him his second Academy Award, also for Best Original Screenplay—and The Hateful Eight (2015), a revisionist Western thriller which opened to audiences with a roadshow release.

Tarantino's ninth and most recent film, Once Upon a Time in Hollywood (2019), was a comedy-drama set in the late 1960s about the transition of Old Hollywood to New Hollywood; he made his debut novel, a novelization of the film, in 2021. Tarantino next wrote the film's standalone sequel, The Further Mis-Adventures of Cliff Booth (2026), which he chose not to direct, instead handing the film to David Fincher. He has tentative plans for his tenth film to be his last before retiring from filmmaking.

== Early life ==
Quentin Jerome Tarantino was born on March 27, 1963, in Knoxville, Tennessee, the only child of Connie McHugh and aspiring actor Tony Tarantino, who left the family before his son's birth. He has claimed to have Cherokee ancestry through his mother, who was also of Irish descent, while his father was Italian-American. He was named in part after Quint Asper, Burt Reynolds's character in the TV series Gunsmoke. Tarantino's mother met his father during a trip to Los Angeles; after a brief marriage and divorce, she left Los Angeles and moved to Knoxville, where her parents lived, and returned to Los Angeles with her son in 1966.

Tarantino's mother married musician Curtis Zastoupil soon after arriving in Los Angeles, and the family moved to nearby Torrance, California. Zastoupil accompanied Tarantino to numerous film screenings, while his mother allowed him to see more mature movies, such as Carnal Knowledge (1971) and Deliverance (1972). After his mother divorced Zastoupil in 1973 and received a misdiagnosis of Hodgkin's lymphoma, Tarantino was again sent to live with his grandparents in Knoxville. Less than a year later, he returned to Torrance.

At the age of 14, Tarantino wrote one of his earliest works, a screenplay called Captain Peachfuzz and the Anchovy Bandit that was based on the 1977 film Smokey and the Bandit. He later revealed that his mother had ridiculed his writing skills when he was younger, and he subsequently vowed never to share any of his future wealth with her. As a 15-year-old, he was grounded by his mother for shoplifting Elmore Leonard's novel The Switch from a Kmart. He was allowed to leave only to attend the Torrance Community Theater, where he participated in such plays as Two Plus Two Makes Sex and Romeo and Juliet. The same year, he dropped out of Narbonne High School in Harbor City.

== Career ==
=== 1986–1993: Early jobs and screenplays ===
Through the 1980s, Tarantino had a number of jobs. After lying about his age, he worked as an usher at an adult movie theater in Torrance, called the Pussycat Theater. He spent time as a recruiter in the aerospace industry, and for five years he worked at Video Archives, a video store in Manhattan Beach, California. He was well known in the local community for his film knowledge and video recommendations; Tarantino stated, "When people ask me if I went to film school, I tell them, 'No, I went to films.'" (Note: Actor Danny Strong describes Tarantino as "such a movie buff. He had so much knowledge of films that he would try to get people to watch really cool movies.") In 1986, Tarantino was employed in his first Hollywood job, working with Video Archives colleague Roger Avary, as production assistants on Dolph Lundgren's exercise video, Maximum Potential.

Before working at Video Archives, Tarantino co-wrote Love Birds In Bondage with Scott Magill. Tarantino would go on to produce and direct the short film. Magill committed suicide in 1987, after which all film shot was destroyed. Later, Tarantino attended acting classes at the James Best Theatre Company, where he met several of his eventual collaborators for his next film. (Note: While at James Best, Tarantino also met Craig Hamann, with whom he would collaborate to produce his second film in 1987.) In 1987, Tarantino co-wrote and directed My Best Friend's Birthday (1987). It was left uncompleted, but some of its dialogue was included in True Romance.

The following year, he played an Elvis impersonator in "Sophia's Wedding: Part 1", an episode in the fourth season of The Golden Girls, which was broadcast on November 19, 1988. Tarantino recalled that the pay he received for the part helped support him during the preproduction of Reservoir Dogs; he estimated he was initially paid about $650 but went on to receive about $3,000 in residuals over three years because the episode was frequently rerun due to it being on a "best of..." lineup.

After meeting Lawrence Bender at a friend's barbecue, Tarantino discussed with him about an unwritten dialogue-driven heist film. Bender encouraged Tarantino to write the screenplay, which he wrote in three and a half weeks and presented to Bender unformatted. Impressed with the script, Bender managed to forward it through contacts to director Monte Hellman. Hellman cleaned up the screenplay and helped secure funding from Richard N. Gladstein at Live Entertainment (which later became Artisan, now known as Lionsgate). Harvey Keitel read the script and also contributed to the budget, taking a role as co-producer and also playing a major part in the picture. In January 1992, it was released as Tarantino's crime thriller Reservoir Dogs—which he wrote, directed, and acted in as Mr. Brown—and screened at the Sundance Film Festival. The film was an immediate hit, receiving a positive response from critics. (Note: Keitel heard of the script through his wife, who had attended a class with Lawrence Bender (see Reservoir Dogs special edition DVD commentary).)

Tarantino's screenplay True Romance was optioned and the film was eventually released in 1993. The second script that Tarantino sold was for the film Natural Born Killers, which was revised by Dave Veloz, Richard Rutowski and director Oliver Stone. Tarantino was given story credit and stated in an interview that he wished the film well, but later disowned the final film. Tarantino also did an uncredited rewrite on It's Pat (1994). Other films where he was an uncredited screenwriter include Crimson Tide (1995) and The Rock (1996).

=== 1993–1999: Breakthrough and acclaim ===
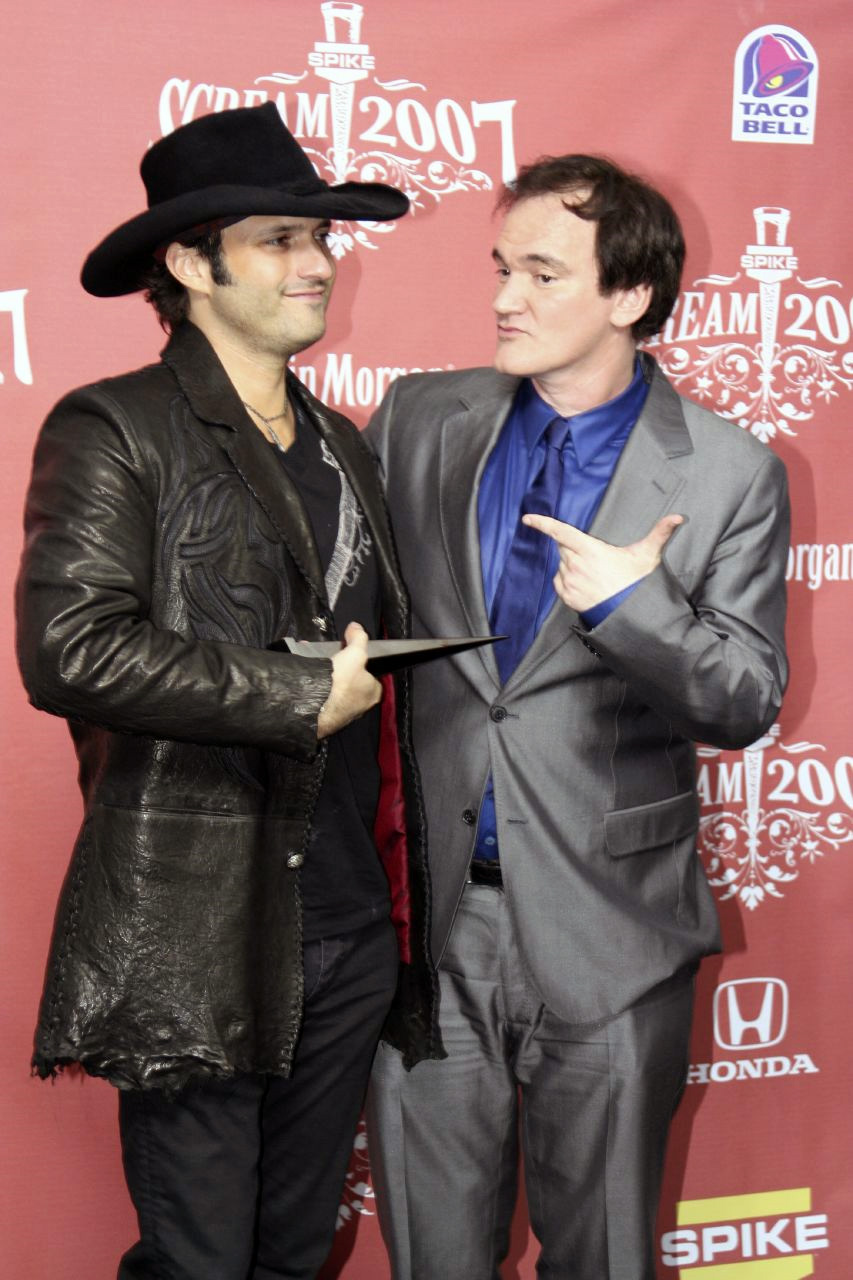
Tarantino has had a number of collaborations with director Robert Rodriguez.

Following the success of Reservoir Dogs, Tarantino was approached by major film studios and offered projects that included Speed (1994) and Men in Black (1997), but he instead retreated to Amsterdam to work on his script for Pulp Fiction. Tarantino wrote, directed, and acted in the dark comedy crime film Pulp Fiction in 1994, maintaining the graphic depiction of violence from his earlier film as well as the non-linear storylines. The film was nominated for seven Academy Awards, including Best Picture. Tarantino was nominated for Best Director and won Best Original Screenplay, which he shared with Roger Avary. Tarantino also won the Palme d'Or for the film at the 1994 Cannes Film Festival. The film grossed over $200 million and earned positive reviews.

In 1995, Tarantino participated in the anthology film Four Rooms, a collaboration that also included directors Robert Rodriguez, Allison Anders and Alexandre Rockwell. Tarantino directed and acted in the fourth segment of "The Man from Hollywood", a tribute to the Alfred Hitchcock Presents episode "Man from the South". He joined Rodriguez again later in the year with a supporting role in Desperado. One of Tarantino's first paid writing assignments was for From Dusk till Dawn, which Rodriguez directed later in 1996, re-teaming with Tarantino in another acting role, alongside Harvey Keitel, George Clooney and Juliette Lewis. (Note: Robert Kurtzman hired Tarantino to write the script for From Dusk till Dawn in exchange for the make-up effects on Reservoir Dogs.) His third feature film was Jackie Brown (1997), an adaptation of Elmore Leonard's novel Rum Punch. A homage to blaxploitation films, it starred Pam Grier, who starred in many of the films of that genre in the 1970s. It received positive reviews and was called a "comeback" for Grier and co-star Robert Forster. Leonard considered Jackie Brown to be his favorite of the 26 different screen adaptations of his novels and short stories.

In the 1990s, Tarantino had a number of other minor acting roles, including in Eddie Presley (1992), The Coriolis Effect (1994), Sleep With Me (1994), Somebody to Love (1994), All-American Girl (1995), Destiny Turns on the Radio (1995), and Girl 6 (1996). Also in 1996, he starred in Steven Spielberg's Director's Chair, a simulation video game that uses pre-generated film clips. In 1998, Tarantino made his major Broadway stage debut as an amoral psycho killer in a revival of the 1966 play Wait Until Dark, which received unfavorable reviews for his performance from critics.

=== 2000–2009: Subsequent success ===
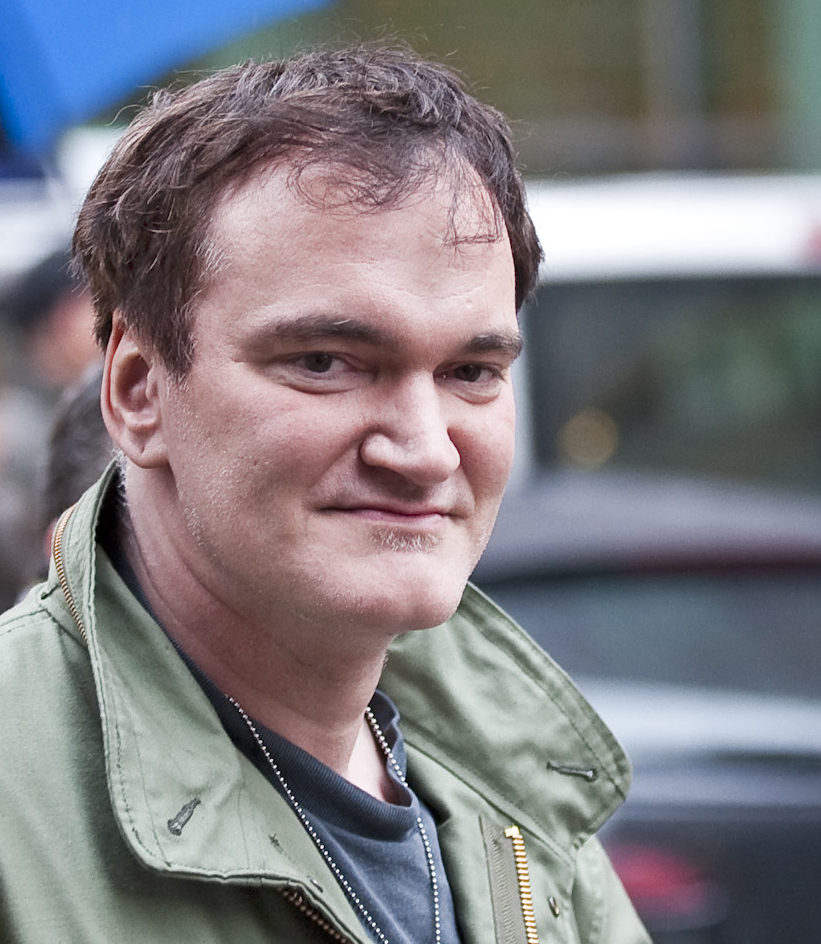
Tarantino in 2009

Tarantino went on to write and direct Kill Bill, a highly stylized "revenge flick" in the cinematic traditions of Chinese martial arts films, Japanese period dramas, Spaghetti Westerns, and Italian horror. It was based on a character called The Bride and a plot that he and Kill Bill's lead actress Uma Thurman had developed during the making of Pulp Fiction. It was originally set for a single theatrical release, but its four-hour running time prompted Tarantino to divide it into two movies. Tarantino says he still considers it a single film in his overall filmography. Volume 1 was released in 2003 and Volume 2 was released in 2004.

From 2002 to 2004, Tarantino portrayed villain McKenas Cole in the ABC television series Alias. In 2004, Tarantino attended the 2004 Cannes Film Festival, where he served as president of the jury. Volume 2 of Kill Bill had a screening there, but was not in competition. Tarantino then contributed to Robert Rodriguez's 2005 neo-noir film Sin City, and was credited as "Special Guest Director" for his work directing the car sequence featuring Clive Owen and Benicio del Toro. In May 2005, Tarantino co-wrote and directed "Grave Danger", the fifth season finale of CSI: Crime Scene Investigation. For this episode, Tarantino was nominated for the Primetime Emmy Award for Outstanding Directing for a Drama Series at the 57th Primetime Emmy Awards.

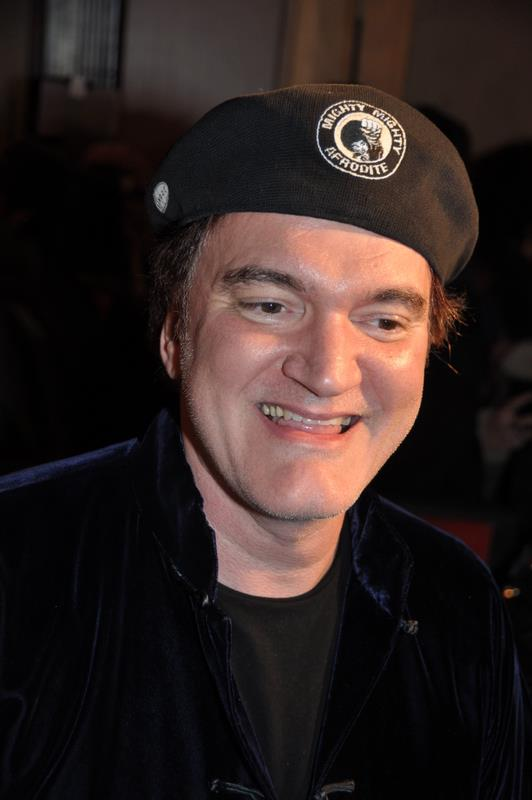
Tarantino at the French premiere of Django Unchained in January 2013

In 2007, Tarantino directed the exploitation slasher film Death Proof. Released as a take on 1970s double features, under the banner Grindhouse, it was co-directed with Rodriguez who did the other feature which was the body horror film Planet Terror. Box-office sales were low but the film garnered mostly positive reviews.

Tarantino's film Inglourious Basterds, released in 2009, is the story of a group of Jewish-American guerrilla soldiers in Nazi-occupied France in an alternate history of World War II. He had planned to start work on the film after Jackie Brown but postponed this to make Kill Bill after a meeting with Uma Thurman. Filming began on "Inglorious Bastards", as it was provisionally titled, in October 2008. The film opened in August 2009 to positive reviews with the highest box office gross in the US and Canada for the weekend on release. For the film, Tarantino earned his second nominations for both the Academy Award for Best Director and the Academy Award for Best Original Screenplay.

=== 2010–present: Established auteur ===
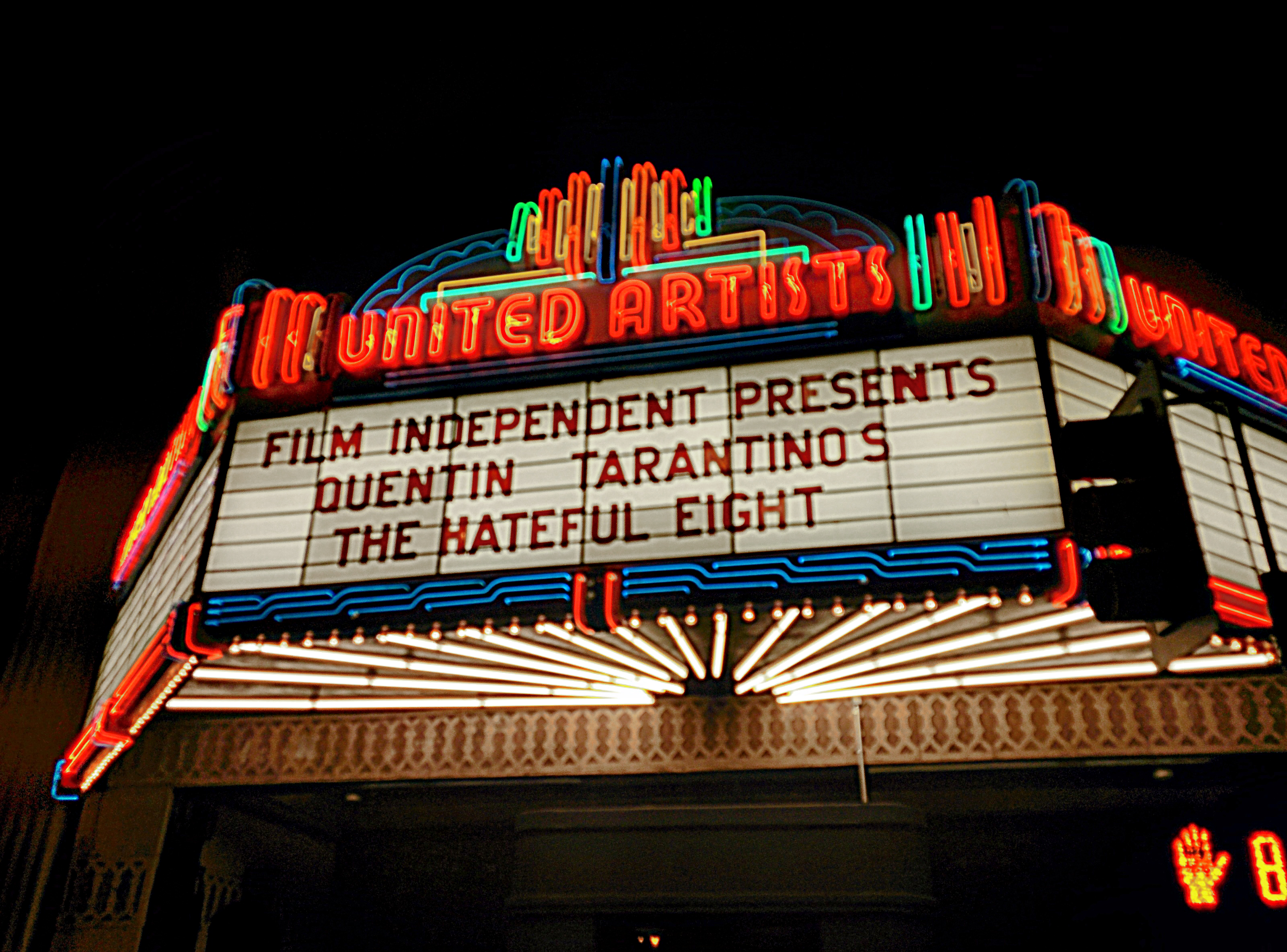
The Hateful Eight live reading at the Ace Hotel Los Angeles in April 2014

In 2011, production began on Django Unchained, a film about the revenge of a former slave in the Southern United States in 1858. The film stemmed from Tarantino's desire to produce a Spaghetti Western set in America's Deep South during the Antebellum Period. Tarantino called the proposed style "a southern", stating that he wanted "to do movies that deal with America's horrible past with slavery and stuff but do them like spaghetti westerns, not like big issue movies. I want to do them like they're genre films, but they deal with everything that America has never dealt with because it's ashamed of it, and other countries don't really deal with because they don't feel they have the right to". It was released in December 2012 and became his highest-grossing film to date. He won his second Academy Award for Best Original Screenplay.

In November 2013, Tarantino said he was working on a new film and that it would be another Western, though not a sequel to Django Unchained. On January 11, 2014, it was revealed that the film would be titled The Hateful Eight. The script was then leaked in January 2014. Aggrieved by the breach of confidence, Tarantino considered abandoning the production which was due to start the next winter and publish it as a novel instead. He stated that he had given the script to a few trusted colleagues, including Bruce Dern, Tim Roth and Michael Madsen. On April 19, 2014, Tarantino directed a live reading of the leaked script at the United Artists Theater in the Ace Hotel Los Angeles for the Live Read series. Tarantino explained that they would read the first draft of the script, and added that he was writing two new drafts with a different ending. Filming went ahead as planned with the new draft in January 2015. The Hateful Eight was released on December 25, 2015, as a roadshow presentation in 70 mm film-format theaters, before being released in digital theaters on December 30, 2015. The film received mostly positive reviews from critics.

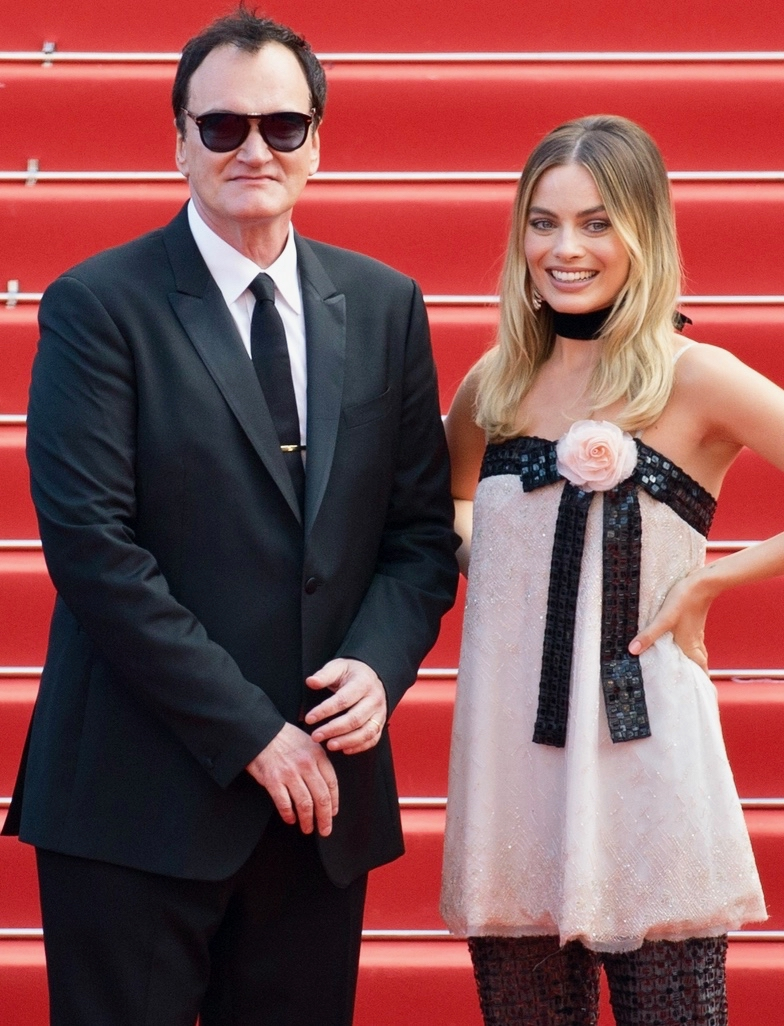
Tarantino with Margot Robbie at the 2019 Cannes Film Festival

In July 2017, it was reported that Tarantino's next project would be a film about the Manson Family murders. In February 2018, it was announced that the film's title would be Once Upon a Time in Hollywood, and that Leonardo DiCaprio would play Rick Dalton, a fictional star of television Westerns, with Brad Pitt as Dalton's longtime stunt double Cliff Booth; Margot Robbie would be playing real life actress Sharon Tate, portrayed as Dalton's next-door neighbor. Filming took place in the summer of 2018. In wake of the Harvey Weinstein sexual abuse allegations, Tarantino severed ties to The Weinstein Company and Miramax and sought a new distributor after working with Weinstein for his entire career.

The film officially premiered at the 2019 Cannes Film Festival, where it was in competition for the Palme d'Or. Sony Pictures eventually distributed the film, which was theatrically released in July 2019. It received critical acclaim Peter Travers of Rolling Stone declared, "Tarantino's all-star fantasia links Hollywood and Manson-era violence into the best and most explosive cinema we've seen all year." The film earned ten Oscar nominations at the 92nd Academy Awards, including three for Tarantino for Best Picture, Best Director and Best Original Screenplay.

==== Tenth and final film and other projects ====
In 2009, Tarantino said that he planned to retire from filmmaking when he is 60 to focus on writing novels and film literature. He is skeptical of the film industry going digital, saying, "If it actually gets to the place where you can't show 35 mm film in theaters anymore and everything is digital projection, I won't even make it to 60." He said though "not etched in stone" he intends to retire after making his tenth movie: "If I get to the 10th, do a good job and don't screw it up, well that sounds like a good way to end the old career."

In November 2022, Tarantino revealed plans to shoot an eight-episode television series in 2023. No further details were provided. Tarantino later elaborated that this project was The Movie Critic, which he later adapted into a film script before deciding not to pursue the project in either format. The film was set in 1977 and centered on a man who wrote movie reviews for a porn magazine. He stated: "I was so excited about the writing, but I wasn't really that excited about dramatizing what I wrote once we were in pre-production." In January 2025, at the 2025 Sundance Film Festival, Tarantino said he was in "no hurry" to make his final film, preferring to wait at least a year, prioritizing to instead write a stage play. In March 2026, it was announced by TMZ that Tarantino and Sylvester Stallone would co-direct and co-write a six-part miniseries featuring gangsters, showgirls, boxing, and music. The series is set to be shot in black and white, using 1930s cameras.

=== As a producer ===
Tarantino has used his Hollywood power to give smaller and foreign films more attention. These films are often labeled "Presented by Quentin Tarantino" or "Quentin Tarantino Presents". In 1995, Tarantino formed Rolling Thunder Pictures with Miramax to release or re-release several independent and foreign features. By 1997, Miramax had shut down the company due to poor sales. The following films were released by Rolling Thunder Pictures: Chungking Express (1994, dir. Wong Kar-wai), Switchblade Sisters (1975, dir. Jack Hill), Sonatine (1993, dir. Takeshi Kitano), Hard Core Logo (1996, dir. Bruce McDonald), The Mighty Peking Man (1977, dir. Ho Meng Hua), Detroit 9000 (1973, dir. Arthur Marks), The Beyond (1981, dir. Lucio Fulci), and Curdled (1996, dir. Reb Braddock).

In 2001, he produced the US release of the Hong Kong martial arts film Iron Monkey, which made over $14 million worldwide. In 2004, he brought the Chinese martial arts film Hero to the US. It opened at number-one at the box office and eventually earning $53.5 million.

While Tarantino was in negotiations with Lucy Liu for Kill Bill, the two helped produce the Hungarian sports documentary Freedom's Fury, which was released in 2006. When he was approached for this documentary about the Blood in the Water match, a water polo match between Hungary and the USSR at the 1956 Melbourne Olympics, Tarantino said "This is the best story I've ever been told. I'd love to be involved".

In 2006, another "Quentin Tarantino presents" production, Hostel, opened at number-one at the box office with a $20.1 million opening weekend. He presented 2006's The Protector, and is a producer of the 2007 film Hostel: Part II. In 2008, he produced the Larry Bishop-helmed Hell Ride, a revenge biker film.

=== As a film exhibitor ===
In February 2010, Tarantino bought the New Beverly Cinema in Los Angeles. Tarantino allowed the previous owners to continue operating the theater, but stated he would make occasional programming suggestions. He was quoted as saying: "As long as I'm alive, and as long as I'm rich, the New Beverly will be there, showing films shot on 35 mm." Starting in 2014, Tarantino took a more active role in programming film screenings at the New Beverly, showing his own films as well as prints from his personal collection. In 2021, Tarantino announced that he had also purchased the Vista Theatre in Los Angeles, stating that he intends to keep it a first-run theatre, and that like The New Beverly it will only show movies on film.

== Filmmaking style and influence ==
=== Early influences ===
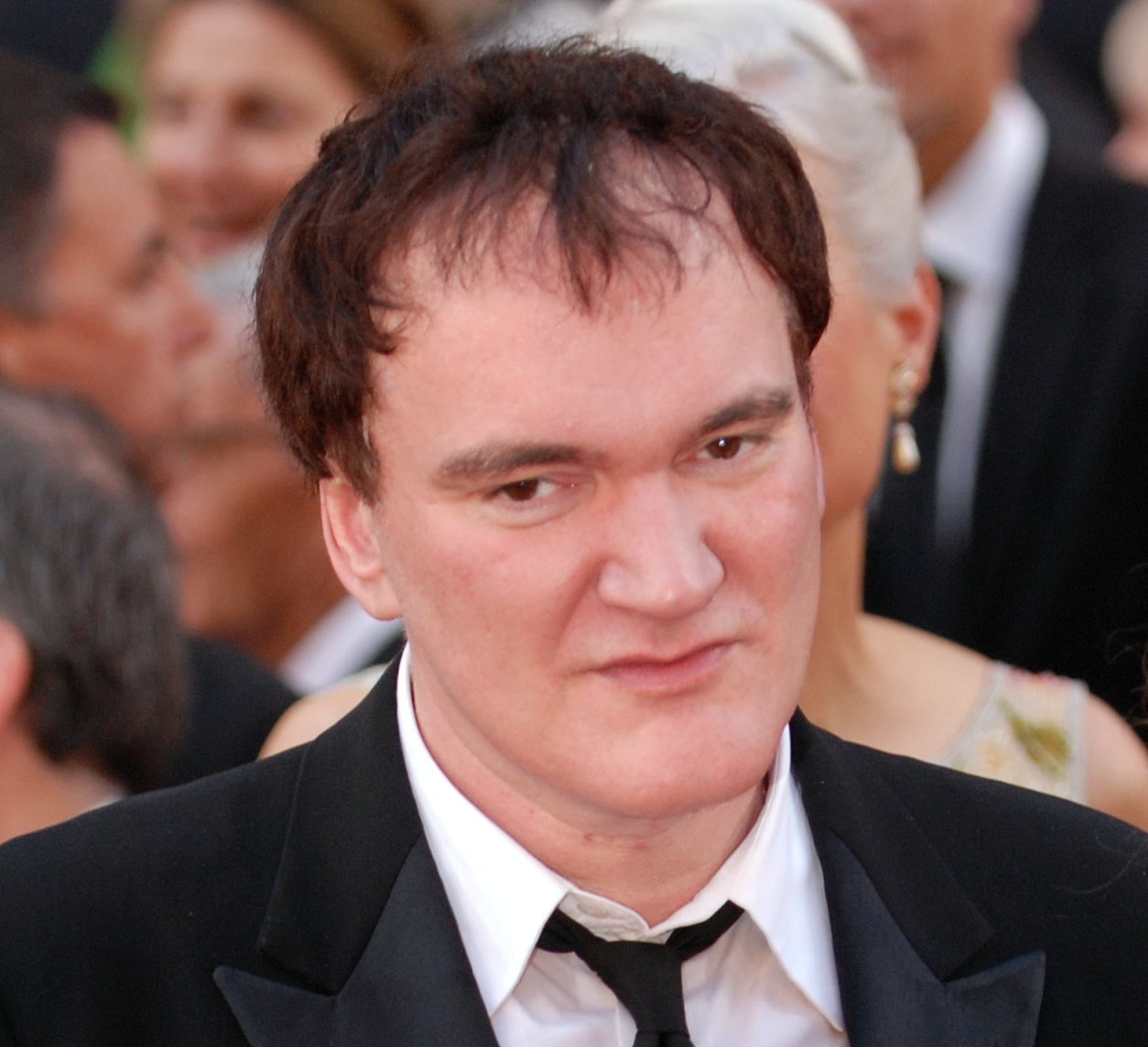
Tarantino at the 82nd Academy Awards in 2010

In the 2012 Sight and Sound directors' poll, Tarantino listed his 12 favorite films: Apocalypse Now, The Bad News Bears, Carrie, Dazed and Confused, The Great Escape, His Girl Friday, Jaws, Pretty Maids All in a Row, Rolling Thunder, Sorcerer, Taxi Driver, and The Good, the Bad and the Ugly.

Sergio Leone's Spaghetti Western films were a profound influence including Once Upon a Time in the West. He is an admirer of the 1981 film Blow Out, directed by Brian De Palma, which led to his casting of John Travolta in Pulp Fiction. Similarly, Tarantino was captivated with Jim McBride's 1983 remake of Breathless and with Richard Gere's unlikable but charismatic protagonist. The film's popular culture references, in particular the comic book Silver Surfer, inspired him to have the character's poster on Mr. Orange's apartment wall in Reservoir Dogs. Tarantino has also labeled Rio Bravo as one of his influences. He listed the Australian suspense film Roadgames (1981) as another favorite film.

Other films he cited as formative influences include Hong Kong martial arts films (such as Five Fingers of Death and Enter the Dragon), John Woo action films (A Better Tomorrow II and The Killer), John Carpenter films (Assault on Precinct 13 and The Thing), blaxploitation films (including The Mack and Foxy Brown), Jean-Luc Godard films (Bande à Part and the 1960 version of Breathless), and Sonny Chiba's work (The Street Fighter and Shadow Warriors).

In August 2007, while teaching in a four-hour film course during the 9th Cinemanila International Film Festival in Manila, Tarantino cited Filipino directors Cirio H. Santiago, Eddie Romero and Gerardo de León as personal icons from the 1970s. He referred to De Leon's "soul-shattering, life-extinguishing" movies on vampires and female bondage, citing in particular Women in Cages; "It is just harsh, harsh, harsh", he said, and described the final shot as one of "devastating despair". Upon his arrival in the Philippines, Tarantino was quoted in the local newspaper as saying, "I'm a big fan of RP [Republic of the Philippines] cinema."

=== Style ===
Tarantino's films often feature graphic violence, a tendency which has sometimes been criticized. Reservoir Dogs was initially denied United Kingdom certification because of his use of torture as entertainment. Tarantino has frequently defended his use of violence, saying that "violence is so good. It affects audiences in a big way". When questioned in an interview for Kill Bill: Volume 1 why his movies contained so much graphic violence, he responded, "Because it's so much fun!" The number of expletives and deaths in Tarantino's films were measured by analytics website FiveThirtyEight. In the examples given by the site, "Reservoir Dogs features 'just' 10 on-screen deaths, but 421 profanities. Django Unchained, on the other hand, has 'just' 262 profanities but 47 deaths." He often blends aesthetic elements, in tribute to his favorite films and filmmakers. In Kill Bill, he melds comic strip formulas and visuals within a live action film sequence, in some cases by the literal use of cartoon or anime images.

Tarantino has also occasionally used a non-linear story structure in his films, most notably with Pulp Fiction. He has also used the style in Reservoir Dogs, Kill Bill, and The Hateful Eight. Tarantino's script for True Romance was originally told in a non-linear style, before director Tony Scott decided to use a more linear approach. Critics have since referred to the use of this shifting timeline in films as the "Tarantino Effect". Actor Steve Buscemi has described Tarantino's novel style of filmmaking as "bursting with energy" and "focused". According to Tarantino, a hallmark of all his movies is that there is a different sense of humor in each one, which prompts the viewer to laugh at scenes that are not funny. However, he insists that his films are dramas, not comedies.

Tarantino's use of dialogue is noted for its mundane conversations with popular culture references. For example, when Jules and Vincent in Pulp Fiction are driving to a hit, they talk about Vincent's trip to Europe, discussing the differences in countries such as a McDonald's "Quarter Pounder with Cheese" being called a "Royale with Cheese" in France because of the metric system. In the opening scene to Reservoir Dogs, Mr. Brown (played by Tarantino) interprets the meaning of Madonna's song "Like a Virgin". In Jackie Brown, Jackie and Max chat over a cup of coffee while listening to a vinyl record by the Delfonics' "Didn't I (Blow Your Mind This Time)".

Tarantino has said that his films take place in one of two cinematic universes, one being the more realistically grounded world of films like Reservoir Dogs and Pulp Fiction, and the other being a meta-fictional narrative which Tarantino says represents the kind of films the characters in his main cinematic universe would watch, which separates films such as From Dusk till Dawn and Kill Bill from Tarantino's primary narrative. He also creates his own products and brands that he uses in his films to varying degrees. His own fictional brands, including "Acuña Boys Tex-Mex Food", "Big Kahuna Burger", "G.O. Juice", "Jack Rabbit Slim's", "K-Billy", "Red Apple cigarettes", "Tenku Brand Beer" and "Teriyaki Donut", replace the use of product placement, sometimes to a humorous extent. Tarantino is also known for his choice of music in his films, including soundtracks that often use songs from the 1960s and 70s. In 2011, he was recognized at the 16th Critics' Choice Awards with the inaugural Music+Film Award.

A recurring image in his films are scenes where women's bare feet feature prominently. When asked about foot fetishism, Tarantino responded, "I don't take it seriously. There's a lot of feet in a lot of good directors' movies. That's just good direction. Like, before me, the person foot fetishism was defined by was Luis Buñuel, another film director. And Alfred Hitchcock was accused of it and Sofia Coppola has been accused of it."

Tarantino has stated in many interviews that his writing process is like writing a novel before formatting it into a script, saying that this creates the blueprint of the film and makes the film feel like literature. About his writing process he told website The Talks, "My head is a sponge. I listen to what everyone says, I watch little idiosyncratic behavior, people tell me a joke and I remember it. People tell me an interesting story in their life and I remember it. ... when I go and write my new characters, my pen is like an antenna, it gets that information, and all of a sudden these characters come out more or less fully formed. I don't write their dialogue, I get them talking to each other."

=== Film criticisms ===
In June 2020, Tarantino became an officially recognized critic on the review aggregation website Rotten Tomatoes where his reviews are part of the "Tomatometer" rating. He has since published over 30 film reviews, including director essays, on his New Beverly Cinema website.

Tarantino reappraises films in ways that challenge the views of mainstream film criticism, for example, he considers the 1983 film Psycho II to be superior to the original 1960 film Psycho. He is also among a few notable directors, including Martin Scorsese and Edgar Wright, who appreciate Elaine May's 1987 film Ishtar, despite its reputation as being a notorious box-office flop and one of the worst films ever made.

Tarantino has opined that Steven Spielberg's Jaws is "the greatest movie of all time. Maybe not the best film, but the best movie ever made". He commented further that his "favourite Spielberg-directed movie, again with Jaws carved out on its own Mount Rushmore, is Indiana Jones and the Temple of Doom ... He pushes the envelope, he creates PG-13; a movie so fucking badass it created a new level in the MPAA."

=== Collaborators ===
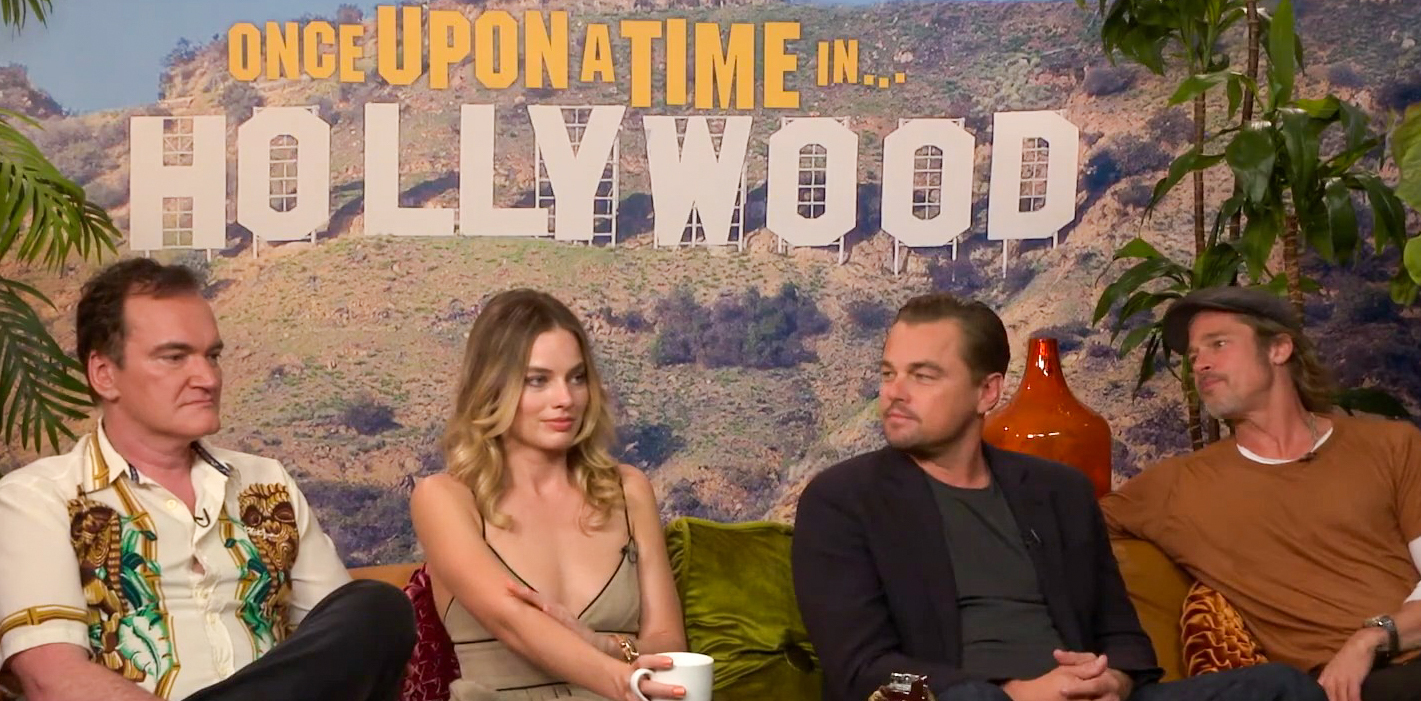
Tarantino with actors Margot Robbie, Leonardo DiCaprio, and Brad Pitt for Once Upon a Time in Hollywood, a film considered as having "his biggest cast yet" with "A-list stars, seventies icons, and veteran Tarantino collaborators".

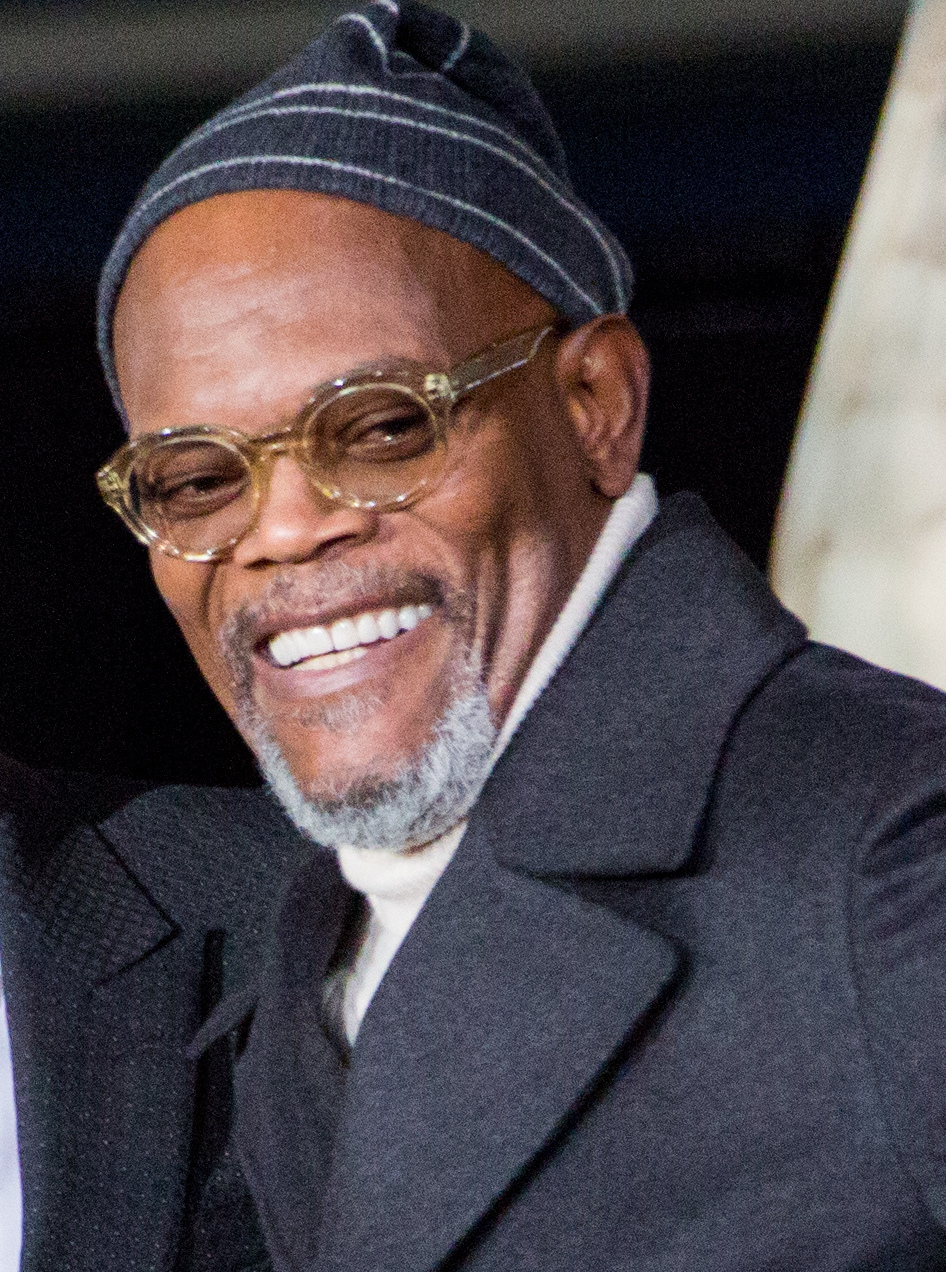
Samuel L. Jackson (pictured in 2017) has been one of Tarantino's most frequent and notable collaborators, with him appearing in six of his films.

Tarantino has built up an informal "repertory company" of actors who have appeared in many roles in his films. Most notable of these is Samuel L. Jackson, who has appeared in five films directed by Tarantino and a sixth written by him, True Romance. Other frequent collaborators include Uma Thurman, who has been featured in three films and whom Tarantino has described as his "muse"; Zoë Bell, who has acted or performed stunts in seven Tarantino films; Michael Madsen, James Parks and Tim Roth, who respectively appear in five, four and three films. In addition, Roth appeared in Four Rooms, an anthology film where Tarantino directed the final segment, and filmed a scene for Once Upon a Time in Hollywood before it was cut for time.

Other actors who have appeared in several films by Tarantino include Michael Bacall, Michael Bowen, Bruce Dern, Harvey Keitel, Michael Parks, Kurt Russell, and Craig Stark, who have appeared in three films each.

Leonardo DiCaprio was in two films and Brad Pitt in three Tarantino films, in Once Upon a Time in Hollywood they appear in together. Like Jackson, Pitt also appeared in the Tarantino-penned True Romance. Christoph Waltz appeared in two Tarantino films, Inglourious Basterds and Django Unchained, winning a Best Supporting Actor Oscar for each role. Waltz had been working as an actor since the 1970s in numerous German movies and TV shows but was a relative unknown in America when he was cast as Hans Landa in his first film for Tarantino.

Editor Sally Menke, who worked on all Tarantino films until her death in 2010, was described by Tarantino in 2007 as "hands down my number one collaborator".

Collaborator	Role	Reservoir Dogs	Pulp Fiction	Jackie Brown	Kill Bill: Volume 1	Kill Bill: Volume 2	Death Proof	Inglourious Basterds	Django Unchained	The Hateful Eight	Once Upon a Time in Hollywood	The Popinjay Cavalier	Total
Michael Bacall	Actor						Yes	Yes	Yes				3
Zoë Bell	Actor/Stunts				Yes	Yes	Yes	Yes	Yes	Yes	Yes		7
Lawrence Bender	Producer	Yes	Yes	Yes	Yes	Yes		Yes					6
Michael Bowen	Actor			Yes	Yes	Yes			Yes				4
Bruce Dern	Actor								Yes	Yes	Yes		3
Omar Doom	Actor						Yes	Yes			Yes		3
Walton Goggins	Actor								Yes	Yes	Yes		3
Samuel L. Jackson	Actor		Yes	Yes		Yes		Yes	Yes	Yes			6
Harvey Keitel	Actor	Yes	Yes					Yes					3
Michael Madsen	Actor	Yes			Yes	Yes				Yes	Yes		5
Shannon McIntosh	Producer						Yes		Yes	Yes	Yes		4
Sally Menke	Editor	Yes	Yes	Yes	Yes	Yes	Yes	Yes					7
James Parks	Actor				Yes	Yes	Yes		Yes	Yes			5
Michael Parks	Actor				Yes	Yes	Yes		Yes				4
Fred Raskin	Editor								Yes	Yes	Yes		3
Robert Richardson	Cinematographer				Yes	Yes		Yes	Yes	Yes	Yes		6
Tim Roth	Actor	Yes	Yes							Yes			3
Kurt Russell	Actor						Yes			Yes	Yes		3
Uma Thurman	Actor		Yes		Yes	Yes							3
David Steen	Actor	Yes							Yes		Yes		3
Jake Garber	Makeup artist				Yes	Yes	Yes	Yes	Yes				5
David Wasco	Production designer	Yes	Yes	Yes	Yes	Yes		Yes					6
Bob Weinstein	Producer		Yes	Yes	Yes	Yes		Yes	Yes	Yes			7
Harvey Weinstein	Producer	Yes	Yes	Yes	Yes		Yes	Yes	Yes	Yes			8

== Controversies ==
=== Spike Lee criticisms ===
In 1997, Spike Lee questioned Tarantino's use of racial slurs in his films, particularly the use of “nigger”, most notably in Pulp Fiction and Jackie Brown. In a Variety interview discussing Jackie Brown, Lee said, "I'm not against the word ... And some people speak that way, but Quentin is infatuated with that word ... I want Quentin to know that all African Americans do not think that word is trendy or slick." Tarantino responded on The Charlie Rose Show:

As a writer, I demand the right to write any character in the world that I want to write. I demand the right to be them, I demand the right to think them and I demand the right to tell the truth as I see they are, all right? And to say that I can't do that because I'm white, but the Hughes brothers can do that because they're black, that is racist. That is the heart of racism, all right. And I do not accept that ... That is how a segment of the black community that lives in Compton, lives in Inglewood, where Jackie Brown takes place, that lives in Carson, that is how they talk. I'm telling the truth. It would not be questioned if I was black, and I resent the question because I'm white. I have the right to tell the truth. I do not have the right to lie.

Tarantino said on The Howard Stern Show that Lee would have to "stand on a chair to kiss [his] ass." Samuel L. Jackson, who has appeared in both directors' films, defended Tarantino. At the Berlin Film Festival, where Jackie Brown was screened, Jackson said: "I don't think the word is offensive in the context of this film ... Black artists think they are the only ones allowed to use the word. Well, that's bull. Jackie Brown is a wonderful homage to black exploitation films. This is a good film, and Spike hasn't made one of those in a few years." Tarantino argued that black audiences appreciated his blaxploitation-influenced films more than some of his critics, and that Jackie Brown was primarily made for black audiences.

Django Unchained was the subject of controversy because of its use of racial slurs and depiction of slavery. Reviewers defended the use of the language by pointing out the historic context of race and slavery in America. Lee, in an interview with Vibe, said that he would not see the film: "All I'm going to say is that it's disrespectful to my ancestors. That's just me ... I'm not speaking on behalf of anybody else." Lee later tweeted: "American slavery was not a Sergio Leone spaghetti western. It was a holocaust. My ancestors are slaves. Stolen from Africa. I will honor them."

=== Roman Polanski and Harvey Weinstein ===
In a 2003 Howard Stern interview, Tarantino defended the director Roman Polanski against charges that Polanski had raped then-13-year-old Samantha Geimer in 1977. He said that Polanski's actions were "not rape" and Geimer "...wanted to have it". The interview resurfaced in 2018 and drew criticism, including from Geimer, who stated in an interview, "He was wrong. I bet he knows it... I hope he doesn't make an ass of himself and keep talking that way." Within days of the interview resurfacing, Tarantino issued an apology, stating "Fifteen years later, I realize how wrong I was... I incorrectly played devil's advocate in the debate for the sake of being provocative."

On October 18, 2017, Tarantino gave an interview discussing sexual harassment and assault allegations against producer Harvey Weinstein. Tarantino said his then-girlfriend Mira Sorvino told him in the mid-1990s about her experience with Weinstein. Tarantino confronted Weinstein at the time and received an apology. Tarantino said: "What I did was marginalize the incidents. I knew enough to do more than I did."

On February 3, 2018, in an interview with The New York Times, Kill Bill actress Uma Thurman said Weinstein had sexually assaulted her, and that she had reported this to Tarantino. Tarantino said he confronted Weinstein, as he had previously when Weinstein made advances on his former partner, demanding he apologize. He banned him from contact with Thurman for the remainder of the film's production. In a June 2021 interview on the Joe Rogan Experience podcast, Tarantino said he regretted not pressing Weinstein further, saying he did not know the extent of his misconduct before the 2017 scandal. He remarked on his "sad" view of his past relationship with Weinstein, saying he once looked up to him for fostering his career and describing him as "a fucked up father figure".

=== Altercations with industry peers ===
In 1993, Tarantino sold his script for Natural Born Killers, which was rewritten, giving him only a story credit. He later disowned the film, which caused enmity and resulted in the publication of a "tell-all" book titled Killer Instinct by Jane Hamsher—who, with Don Murphy, had an original option on the screenplay and produced the film—calling Tarantino a "one-trick pony" and becoming "famous for being famous." Tarantino physically assaulted Murphy in the AGO restaurant in West Hollywood, California in October 1997. Murphy subsequently filed a $5 million lawsuit against Tarantino; the case ended with the judge ordering Tarantino to pay Murphy $450.

In 1994, Tarantino had an on-set feud with Denzel Washington during the filming of Crimson Tide over what was described as "Tarantino's racist dialogue added to the script". A few years later Washington apologized to Tarantino saying he "buried that hatchet".

In 1997, during the Oscars ceremony, Tarantino was accompanying Mira Sorvino when the then-MTV News host, Chris Connelly, called over to Sorvino from the media scrum. Before she could talk to Connelly, Tarantino grabbed Sorvino telling her, "He's the editor of Premiere and he did a story on my Dad," and pulled her away. Connelly, a former Premiere magazine editor-in-chief said, "No, I didn't." As they walked off, Tarantino gave the journalist the finger saying "Fuck you!" and spat at him. The article that angered Tarantino included a 1995 interview from a biography by Jami Bernard with his biological father, Tony Tarantino, someone he had never met, which he considered "pretty tasteless".

In 2009, Tarantino was set to appear on the talk show Late Show with David Letterman to promote Inglourious Basterds. A few years prior to this event, David Letterman had interviewed a former "unnamed" girlfriend of Tarantino on his show. Letterman joked about the relationship questioning why a "glorious movie star" would date a "little squirrelly guy". A couple of days later, Tarantino phoned Letterman, screaming angrily, "I'm going to beat you to death! I'm going to kill you! I'm coming to New York, and I'm gonna beat the crap out of you! How can you say that about me?!" Letterman offered to pay for Tarantino's flight and let him choose the method of fighting, which Tarantino determined would be "bats". However, Letterman never heard from Tarantino again, until years later, when he came on the show to promote the new film. The host approached Tarantino in the make-up room, just before the show went live, and demanded an apology. Tarantino was not forthcoming, but at his publicist's urging, he begrudgingly conceded.

In 2013, during an interview with Krishnan Guru-Murthy on Channel 4 News while promoting Django Unchained in the UK, Tarantino reacted angrily when he was questioned about whether there was a link between movie violence and real-life violence. He informed Guru-Murthy that he had commented on the subject many times before and did not need to explain again, therefore was "shutting [his] butt down". Tarantino further defied the journalist, saying: "I refuse your question. I'm not your slave and you're not my master. You can't make me dance to your tune. I'm not a monkey."

In 2019, during the Cannes Film Festival, at the Once Upon a Time in Hollywood press conference, a journalist asked why Margot Robbie had so few lines in the film. Tarantino responded indignantly "I just reject your hypothesis", with no further comment.

In December 2025, during his appearance on The Bret Easton Ellis Podcast, Tarantino criticized the acting of Paul Dano, Owen Wilson, and Matthew Lillard. In Dano's case, Tarantino expressed his dislike towards Dano's performance in There Will Be Blood, referring to him as "a weak, uninteresting guy", "the weakest male actor in SAG", and "the limpest dick in the world", and said that Austin Butler would have been a better choice for the role. Tarantino's comments received harsh criticism from others in the industry, including Dano's There Will Be Blood co-star Daniel Day-Lewis, and Tarantino's From Dusk Till Dawn co-star George Clooney. While attending GalaxyCon, Lillard responded by saying that, "Listen, the point is that hurts your feelings. It fucking sucks. And you wouldn't say that to Tom Cruise. You wouldn't say that to somebody who's a top-line actor in Hollywood."

== Other work ==
=== Books ===
In 2020, Tarantino signed a two-book deal with HarperCollins. He published his first novel in June 2021, a novelization of Once Upon a Time in Hollywood. It received positive reviews from The New York Times and The Guardian. The second book titled Cinema Speculation, about films of the New Hollywood era, inspired by film critic Pauline Kael was published on November 1, 2022. He wrote a novelization of The Further Mis-Adventures of Cliff Booth, titled The Adventures of Cliff Booth, which is set to be published by HarperCollins on December 8, 2026.

=== Podcast ===
In June 2021, Tarantino announced plans to start a podcast with Roger Avary. The podcast is named after Video Archives, a video rental store that both directors worked at prior to their film careers, and features the directors and occasional guests examining a film which could have been offered for rental at the store. The podcast premiered on July 19, 2022.

=== Play ===
By March 2026, Tarantino began production on the play The Popinjay Cavalier, which is set to have a preview at the Phoenix Theatre on February 23, 2027, before its official debut on March 18.

== Personal life ==
=== Relationships and marriage ===
In the early 1990s, Tarantino dated comedians Margaret Cho and Kathy Griffin. From 1995 to 1998, he dated actress Mira Sorvino and was her date at the 68th Oscars ceremony where she won the Academy Award for Best Supporting Actress. In March 1998 they separated, with Sorvino releasing a statement that "[We] still love each other very much" but had reached a "mutual decision to go their separate ways." From 2003 to 2005, Tarantino was in a romantic relationship with filmmaker Sofia Coppola. The two have remained friends since their breakup.

On June 30, 2017, Tarantino became engaged to Israeli singer Daniella Pick, daughter of musician Zvika Pick. They met in 2009 when Tarantino was in Israel to promote Inglourious Basterds. They married on November 28, 2018, in a Reform Jewish ceremony in their Beverly Hills Home. As of January 2020, they were splitting their time between the Ramat Aviv Gimel neighborhood of Tel Aviv and Los Angeles. As a result, he is trying to learn Hebrew. On February 22, 2020, their son was born in Israel. On July 3, 2022, their second child, a daughter, was also born in Israel.

In April 2025, Tarantino and Pick bought a property in Tel Aviv worth $13.8 million, with plans to build a home there. That August, Tarantino announced he and Pick would be relocating to London in 2026, in preparation for his first West End play The Popinjay Cavalier.

=== Political views ===
In 2015, Tarantino said that Barack Obama is his favorite president and voiced support for the Black Lives Matter movement.

In response to the 2023 October 7 attacks, Tarantino visited a military base in southern Israel to "boost the morale" of Israeli troops.

In August 2024, Tarantino expressed his intention to vote for Democratic presidential nominee Kamala Harris in the 2024 presidential election on Bill Maher's podcast Club Random.

=== Religious beliefs ===
As a youth, Tarantino attended an Evangelical church, describing himself as "baptized, born again and everything in between". Tarantino said this was an act of rebellion against his Catholic mother as she had encouraged what might usually be considered more conventional forms of rebellion, such as his interests in comic books and horror films. Throughout the 1990s and 2000s, Tarantino was evasive about his religious beliefs but said he believed in God, whom he credited with giving him his writing ability.

In the 2010s, Tarantino continued ascribing his talents to gifts from God but expressed uncertainty regarding God's existence. "I think I was born Catholic, but I was never practiced," said Tarantino. "As time has gone on, as I've become a man and made my way further as an adult, I'm not sure how much any of that I believe in. I don't really know if I believe in God, especially not in this Santa Claus character that people seemed to have conjured up." In June 2021, Tarantino said he was an atheist.

=== Views on gun violence and police brutality ===
Tarantino has said he does not believe that violence in film inspires real acts of violence. In an interview with Terry Gross, Tarantino expressed "annoyance" at the suggestion that there is a link between the two, saying, "I think it's disrespectful to [the] memory of those who died to talk about movies ... Obviously the issue is gun control and mental health."

In October 2015, Tarantino attended a rally held in New York protesting police brutality. The event aimed to call attention to "police brutality and its victims". At the event Tarantino made a speech, "I'm a human being with a conscience ... And when I see murder I cannot stand by. And I have to call the murdered the murdered and I have to call the murderers the murderers."

As a response to Tarantino's comments police unions across the United States called for a boycott of his upcoming film at the time, The Hateful Eight. Patrick J. Lynch, union president of the Police Benevolent Association of the City of New York, said, "It's no surprise that someone who makes a living glorifying crime and violence is a cop-hater, too. The police officers that Quentin Tarantino calls 'murderers' aren't living in one of his depraved big screen fantasies — they're risking and sometimes sacrificing their lives to protect communities from real crime and mayhem." The Los Angeles Police Department Chief Charlie Beck said Tarantino "doesn't understand the nature of the violence. Mr. Tarantino lives in a fantasy world. That's how he makes his living. His movies are extremely violent, but he doesn't understand violence. … Unfortunately, he mistakes lawful use of force for murder, and it's not."

Tarantino's response to this criticism was, "All cops are not murderers ... I never said that. I never even implied that." In an MSNBC interview with Chris Hayes, he said, "Just because I was at an anti-police-brutality protest doesn't mean I'm anti-police." He clarified his protest comments, "We were at a rally where unarmed people – mostly black and brown – who have been shot and killed or beaten or strangled by the police, and I was obviously referring to the people in those types of situations. I was referring to Eric Garner, I was referring to Sam DuBose, I was referring to Antonio Guzman Lopez, I was referring to Tamir Rice ... In those cases in particular that we're talking about, I actually do believe that they were murder [sic]."

== Works ==
Tarantino has stated that he plans to make a total of just ten films before retiring as a director, as a means of ensuring an overall high quality within his filmography. He believes "most directors have horrible last movies," that ending on a "decent movie is rare," and that ending on a "good movie is kind of phenomenal." Regarding his own filmography, Tarantino considers Kill Bill to be a single film split across two volumes. While he wrote and produced the 2026 film, The Further Mis-Adventures of Cliff Booth, a sequel to Once Upon a Time in Hollywood set in 1977, he chose not to direct it; instead he handed the project to David Fincher, whom he calls "one of the two best directors" alongside himself.

Directed features
Year	Title	Distributor
1992	Reservoir Dogs	Miramax Films
1994	Pulp Fiction	Miramax Films
1997	Jackie Brown	Miramax Films
2004	Kill Bill (Note: Initially released as Kill Bill: Volume 1 and Kill Bill: Volume 2 in 2003 and 2004, respectively.)	Miramax Films
2007	Death Proof	Dimension Films
2009	Inglourious Basterds	The Weinstein Company/Universal Pictures
2012	Django Unchained	The Weinstein Company/Columbia Pictures
2015	The Hateful Eight	The Weinstein Company
2019	Once Upon a Time in Hollywood	Columbia Pictures (through Sony Pictures Releasing)

Directed plays
Year	Title	Venue
2027	The Popinjay Cavalier	Phoenix Theatre, West End

== Awards, honors and recognition ==
Tarantino and his films have received numerous nominations for major awards, including Academy Awards, BAFTA Awards, Golden Globe Awards, Directors Guild of America Awards, and Saturn Awards. He has won the Academy Award for Best Original Screenplay twice, for Pulp Fiction and Django Unchained. He has been nominated four times for the Palme d'Or at the Cannes Film Festival, winning once for Pulp Fiction in 1994. In addition to his recognition for writing and directing films, Tarantino has received five Grammy Award nominations and a Primetime Emmy Award nomination.

In 2005, Tarantino was awarded the honorary Icon of the Decade at the 10th Empire Awards. He has received lifetime achievement awards from two organizations, Cinemanila, and from the Rome Film Festival in 2012. In 2011, Tarantino was given an Honorary César by the Académie des Arts et Techniques du Cinéma.

For his work on Pulp Fiction, Tarantino became the first director to ever sweep "The Big Four" critics awards (LA, NBR, NY, NSFC) and the first of the five directors (including Curtis Hanson, Steven Soderbergh, David Fincher, and Barry Jenkins) to do so as of 2025.

=== Recognition ===
During his career, Tarantino's films have garnered a cult following, as well as critical and commercial success. In 2005, he was included on the annual Time 100 list of the most influential people in the world. He was also on The Daily Telegraph list of "Top 100 Living Geniuses" in 2007. Filmmaker and historian Peter Bogdanovich has called him "the single most influential director of his generation". Tarantino has received a star on the Hollywood Walk of Fame for his contributions to the film industry.

In 2013, a survey of seventeen academics was carried out to discover which filmmakers had been referenced the most in essays and dissertations on film that had been marked in the previous five years. It revealed that Tarantino was the most-studied director in the United Kingdom, ahead of Alfred Hitchcock, Christopher Nolan, Martin Scorsese and Steven Spielberg.

Year	Film	Academy Awards		Palme d'Or		BAFTA Awards		Golden Globe Awards		Saturn Awards	
Year	Film	Nom.	Wins	Nom.	Wins	Nom.	Wins	Nom.	Wins	Nom.	Wins
1994	Pulp Fiction	7	1	1	1	9	2	6	1	1	1
1997	Jackie Brown	1				2		2			
2003	Kill Bill: Volume 1					5		1		7	2
2004	Kill Bill: Volume 2							2		7	3
2007	Death Proof			1						1	
2009	Inglourious Basterds	8	1	1		6	1	4	1	7	1
2012	Django Unchained	5	2			5	2	5	2	4	1
2015	The Hateful Eight	3	1			3	1	3	1	5	
2019	Once Upon a Time in Hollywood	10	2	1		10	1	5	3	7	3
Total		34	7	4	1	40	7	28	8	42	11

Directed Academy Award performances
Under Tarantino's direction, these actors have received Academy Award wins and nominations for their performances in their respective roles.

Year	Performer	Film	Result
Academy Award for Best Actor
1994	John Travolta	Pulp Fiction	Nominated
2019	Leonardo DiCaprio	Once Upon a Time in Hollywood	Nominated
Academy Award for Best Supporting Actor
1994	Samuel L. Jackson	Pulp Fiction	Nominated
1997	Robert Forster	Jackie Brown	Nominated
2009	Christoph Waltz	Inglourious Basterds	Won
2012	Christoph Waltz	Django Unchained	Won
2019	Brad Pitt	Once Upon a Time in Hollywood	Won
Academy Award for Best Supporting Actress
1994	Uma Thurman	Pulp Fiction	Nominated
2015	Jennifer Jason Leigh	The Hateful Eight	Nominated

== See also ==
- List of atheists in film, radio, television and theater
- Quentin Tarantino's unrealized projects
- Quentin Tarantino Film Festival, a film festival in Austin, Texas, United States, hosted by Tarantino
- QT8: The First Eight, a 2019 documentary about Tarantino
