= Say Goodnight, Gracie =

Play written by Rupert Holmes

Broadway Playbill

Say Goodnight, Gracie is a one-man play by Rupert Holmes.

Adapted from the reminiscences of George Burns, the multimedia presentation traces the comedian-raconteur's life from his childhood on the Lower East Side of Manhattan to his early career in vaudeville to his momentous meeting and subsequent personal and professional relationships with wife Gracie Allen.

After 27 previews, the Broadway production, directed by John Tillinger, opened on October 10, 2002, at the Helen Hayes Theatre, where it ran for 364 performances. It is the third-longest-running solo show in Broadway history. Frank Gorshin starred as Burns, and Didi Conn provided the pre-recorded voice of Allen.

Holmes was nominated for the Tony Award for Best Play and Gorshin was nominated for the Drama Desk Award for Outstanding Solo Performance.

The production has toured extensively throughout the United States following its New York closing, with Joel Rooks, Don McArt, and Alan Safier taking over for Gorshin as George Burns. Jamie Farr filled in for Gorshin on tour for two months when he became ill in 2004, but Gorshin returned to the role before his death in 2005.
