= Grave Danger =

- CSI: Crime Scene Investigation episodes
- Episode nos.: Season 5 Episodes 24/25
- Directed by: Quentin Tarantino
- Story by: Quentin Tarantino
- Teleplay by: Anthony E. Zuiker; Carol Mendelsohn; Naren Shankar
- Production code: 05024/05025
- Original air date: May 19, 2005

Guest appearances
- John Saxon (Walter Gordon); Frank Gorshin (himself); Tony Curtis (himself); Lois Chiles (Jillian Stokes); Andrew Prine (Judge Bill "Cisco" Stokes)

Episode chronology
← Previous "Iced"	Next → "Bodies in Motion"

"Grave Danger" is the two-part season finale of the fifth season of the American crime drama CSI: Crime Scene Investigation, which is set in Las Vegas, Nevada. Directed by Quentin Tarantino, who also wrote the story for the two-part episode, and written by series creator Anthony E. Zuiker, Carol Mendelsohn, and Naren Shankar, "Grave Danger" is the 24th and the 25th episode of the season and the 116th and the 117th episode of the series overall, and aired on CBS on May 19, 2005. The episode features veteran actors Tony Curtis and Frank Gorshin as long-time friends of character Sam Braun. Gorshin died two days before the episode aired in the United States. The episode was later dedicated to his memory.

== Summary ==
The separated graveyard-shift team join together after one of their own is kidnapped from a crime scene and held for a million dollar ransom by a mysterious and vengeful assailant. However, it soon appears that the kidnapping may be about more than the ransom.

== Plot ==
=== Volume 1 ===
The show opens with Nick Stokes driving down The Strip at night, listening to Bob Neuwirth's "Lucky Too" on the radio. He pulls over at a car park and a uniformed officer leads him to the "body": a set of intestines coiled in an alley. When the officer walks off to be sick, Nick wanders down the alley and spots a styrofoam coffee cup, already in an evidence bag. As he crouches down to photograph it, he is snatched from behind and a cloth is clamped over his face.

Twenty-five minutes later, police officers and CSIs swarm the scene. Conrad Ecklie, Assistant Director of the Crime Lab, arrives and assures Grissom and Catherine that "the crime lab only has one case tonight." As they search the scene, they find Nick's stab vest, camera and kit lying on the ground. They see the bagged coffee cup and realize that Nick did not bag it. The scene cuts to earlier that night: Grissom and Sara are reviewing a past homicide case, Greg and Hodges are playing a Dukes of Hazzard board game and Nick and Warrick toss a coin to choose assignments: an assault at a strip club or a "trash run" at the intersection of Flamingo and Koval. Nick loses and Warrick leaves for the club, gloating.

Back to the present, police scent dogs track the smell of Nick's vest to an empty parking space on a side street. Warrick notices a void in the fallen rain and takes measurements. With the help of the lab technicians and a dispatch officer, Warrick determines the getaway vehicle to be a Ford Expedition and tracks its escape route on the traffic camera video tapes. Doc Robbins determines that the entrails belong to a dog.

A cut scene shows the kidnapper (as yet unidentified) placing an unconscious Nick in a Plexiglas coffin, throwing in his loaded service pistol, a set of glow sticks—one already lit—and a dictaphone. The coffin lid closes and earth is shoveled on top of it. Grissom and the team review: there was no trace on the coffee cup or the evidence bag, although there was ether on a white fiber present on Nick's stab vest. In the corridor, Hodges grapples with a delivery man, who had just delivered a package marked "RE: Stokes". Grissom hurries into the layout room, carrying the package.

The scene cuts to the coffin. Nick wakes up and knocks his head on the coffin lid. He checks the magazine of his pistol and cocks it. He listens to the dictaphone tape. A taunting voice speaks:

Hi, CSI guy.
You wondering why you're here? Because you followed the evidence.
Because that's what CSIs do. So breathe quick, breathe slow, put your gun in your mouth and pull the trigger. Any way you like, you're going to die here...okay?

Nick panics, twisting to find a way out, hammering on the coffin lid and starts to scream. At the crime lab, Grissom opens the package, which contains an audio tape, which mockingly plays "Outside Chance" by The Turtles, and a USB key that links to a website; the website shows the message "One million dollars in 12 hours or the CSI dies. Drop-off instructions to follow. And now for your viewing pleasure...you can only WATCH." There is a link on the page which opens a webcam viewer and activates a light in the coffin, broadcasting from the coffin; the CSIs watch on in horror as Nick frantically pounds on the box lid, with the music on the tape playing and telling them that "You don't stand an outside chance." They determine that it is a live feed and Warrick resolves to "keep the light on".

Brass interviews the delivery man, and obtains the address which the package was picked up from: 625 Viking Circle. He and a SWAT team storm the house, but find only an overweight drunk lying on the couch; the address was picked at random. Back at the lab, Nick's parents, Judge Bill Stokes and his wife Jillian, meet with Grissom, who shows them the webcam link. Meanwhile, Ecklie briefs the staff: the city will not finance the ransom, despite his pleading with his boss, Undersheriff McKeen.

In desperation, Catherine asks her father, casino mogul Sam Braun to donate the money for the ransom. After some hesitation, Braun does turn over $1 million. When Catherine returns to the lab, Grissom is angry that she received the money from a former murder suspect. However, in the absence of other plans, he agrees to deliver the money. Soon afterwards, a message appears on the webcam site, giving an address—4672 Carney Lane, Boulder Highway—and a deadline: "Be there in 20 minutes, or don't bother coming."

Grissom goes alone to Carney Lane; the address is a disused barn. Inside, he sees the corpse of a dog and a white Ford Expedition matching the description of the getaway vehicle. He walks through a door and meets the kidnapper, Walter Gordon (who is not identified by name at this stage). Gordon is skeptical that the money is real and not booby-trapped. He taunts Grissom, reminding him that the police are not supposed to negotiate with terrorists. When he is pressed for Nick's location, he asks:

What does Nick Stokes mean to you? How do you feel when you see him in that coffin?
Does your soul die every time you push that button?
How do you feel, knowing that there's nothing you can do to get him out of that hell? Helpless? Useless? Impotent? Good. Welcome to my world.

Gordon opens his jacket, revealing a belt of Semtex and a detonator. As Grissom backs away, Gordon flips the switch and blows himself up. The episode ends with a shot of Grissom lying on the floor of the barn, splattered with blood, while Sam Braun's money drifts down through the air towards the ground.

=== Volume 2 ===
After the prime suspect blows himself up, Grissom and the team must continue to find Nick using the evidence they have managed to put together. Greg and Warrick tap into the Expedition's trip computer to narrow down a search radius, Catherine collects up Sam's money and Sara finds the kidnapper's amputated thumb, but on returning to the lab she cannot match the print.

Inside the coffin, Nick realizes that every time the CSIs click the "Watch" button, the fan supplying him with air switches off as its power supply is diverted to power the lights. He starts to rage at the unseen viewers for switching on the light. In the AV lab, Warrick watches as Nick suddenly becomes still and plugs his ears with chewing gum. As Nick draws his gun and racks the slide, Warrick leaps to his feet, urging Nick not to fire. In the box, Nick turns the gun away from his own head and shoots out the light by his feet. Warrick yells at the screen until Nick snaps one of the spare glow sticks and can be seen moving around inside the coffin. Grissom enters and comments that "at least Nick's keeping it together."

Meanwhile, Mia and Sara are in the DNA lab; Mia ran the DNA from the thumb through CODIS and found a partial match to Kelly Gordon, the kidnapper's daughter, who was convicted three years previously of accessory to murder. Grissom looks up the file, and sees that the homicide took place at 625 Viking Circle—where the messenger picked up the package containing the USB key. On the evidence log, they note a styrofoam cup, which contained Kelly's DNA and sealed her conviction. Brass and Sara have her brought to interrogation, and ask her if she knows where Nick is being held. Kelly, bitter because she is being abused by her cellmate, expresses her hope that Nick dies, but also reveals that she used to work in horticulture.

At the crime scene, Warrick loses his temper at Greg due to the lack of progress, and kicks a bucket of liquid at him. When Catherine leaves to talk to Warrick, Greg notices that the liquid is sinking into the ground in some places on the floor, and the team frantically begin to dig. Inside the box, Nick hears cracking noises; thinking it to be a rescue effort, he starts to belt out "Lucky Too", the song which he sang in the car at the start of the episode. However, when the CSIs open the box that they found, they find that it is only a prototype, containing a dead dog. Nick looks around inside his coffin and realizes that the cracking noises are the result of his shooting earlier; the box is breaking apart.

Back in the lab, Warrick takes the box apart, confirming that the fan and light were linked. Grissom watches on the monitor as Nick records his goodbyes to his family and friends; he is able to lip read (a skill learned when Grissom was losing his hearing) Nick's words as he apologizes to Grissom for ever disappointing him, possibly a reference to his affair with prostitute Kristy Hopkins. Suddenly, Nick begins to convulse and scream, the team thinks he is starting to go crazy, but Grissom zooms in on the video, and sees ants crawling around and on top of Nick.

Later, Nick forces himself to stay still, and plugs his nose and ears with a torn latex glove. Meanwhile, Grissom manages to get a close screenshot of the ants and identifies them as Solenopsis invicta, a species of fire ant. These are only present in nurseries in Nevada, as the natural soil is unsuited to them, so he cross-references the Expedition's range and the narrowed webcam trace area to narrow the search area to two nurseries. Sara remembers the comment that Kelly made about her work at a garden center, and the CSIs race to the location.

On site, dozens of officers fan out, and Catherine sweeps the ground with an electronic scanner and soon locks onto the webcam transmitter and finds the vent pipe. Inside, Nick is still being ravaged by fire ants.

The scene cuts to the autopsy room; in black and white, we see Al Robbins and "Super" Dave Phillips cheerfully dissecting Nick, who watches dispassionately. Robbins then gives a lecture to Judge Stokes on the cause of death. Nick realizes he is hallucinating, and snaps out of this disturbing thought. At this point, Nick is starting to fibrillate due to all of the ant bites. But when he comes to, he is unaware that the CSIs are above him, digging their way to him, and puts his gun against his chin. Just as his finger is tightening on the trigger, Warrick clears away the dirt from the top of the coffin. At his urgings, Nick drops the gun. The team forces open one corner of the coffin and use a fire extinguisher to send in short bursts of carbon dioxide, killing the ants. However, before they can pull him out, Catherine receives a phone call from David Hodges; the GCMS found traces of Semtex on the underside of the box, attached to a pressure switch. Catherine shouts a warning, and the CSIs run away from the coffin, Warrick somewhat reluctantly. Nick panics as he sees the team leave, but Grissom dives into the hole to calm him.

When Nick continues to scream and pound on the box lid, Grissom addresses him as "Pancho," the name that Bill Stokes uses for his son. Nick freezes, and Grissom explains the booby trap to him. He opens the box, but Nick remains lying down. A line is clipped to his belt and a nearby tractor is enlisted to dump 200 pounds (91 kg) of dirt onto the coffin, to equalize the pressure. On Grissom's order, the team pull on the line to get Nick clear and the dirt is released—not fast enough to prevent the explosion, but enough to suppress it and save Nick. As the wounded CSI is bundled into an ambulance, with Catherine and Warrick at his side, Grissom tells Ecklie that he wants his guys back. A few days later, Nick goes to visit Kelly at Nevada State Prison. She is uninterested in what he has to say at the start, but he manages to get her to listen. He begs her "not to take it with her" when she leaves the jail. Kelly hangs up and leaves, but she later sits awake in her cell, mulling over his words.

== Critical analysis ==
=== Reception ===
When first screened in the US, this episode was number one on the Nielsen ratings with an average of 30.05 million viewers, although as the viewing figures grew throughout the show, it hit a high of 35.15 million. This meant it had twice as many people watching it as its nearest competition, The Apprentice.

In 2009, TV Guide ranked this episode #47 on its list of the 100 Greatest Episodes.

=== Comparison ===
==== To other Tarantino works ====
The intestines found at the first scene

Nick's situation echoes that of The Bride, played by Uma Thurman, in the Tarantino film Kill Bill: Volume 2; both are buried alive. In the original broadcast, the two episodes were entitled Volume 1 and Volume 2, mimicking the nomenclature of the Kill Bill films. An exchange between Walter Gordon and Grissom also paraphrases a line from the movie (italics indicate the shared dialogue):

- Gordon: You're telling me there's a million dollars in there? Along with some cute little booby traps? Which is it, a tracer, a dye pack?
- Grissom: Normally you'd be 100 percent right, but this time you're 100 percent wrong.

Visually, the episodes have been referred to as "Tarantino-esque...really attentive to detail" by Gary Dourdan, who plays Warrick. His co-star Marg Helgenberger opined that "his [Tarantino's] filmmaking style lends itself really well to CSI... there's an enormous amount of close-ups, and it's a very visual show".

Some elements of the episode, such as the pile of intestines that lures Nick to the alley, Walter Gordon's suicide and the black-and-white autopsy scene which Nick imagines when he is trapped in the coffin have been likened to the viscera of Kill Bill and other Tarantino films, and Nick's hallucination of Al Robbins and David Phillips conducting his autopsy is also similar to Tarantino's cinematography in the same film. The use of nonlinear storytelling at the beginning of the episode (going forwards in time to the search for Nick, back to the early evening and so on) also mimics Kill Bill volumes 1 and 2, which present various elements of the story in a nonlinear order over two films.

==== To "Crate 'n Burial" ====
"Crate 'n Burial" is a season 1 episode of CSI which bears many resemblances in terms of plot, to "Grave Danger". For example, the kidnapper buries his victim, a businessman's wife, underground in the Nevada desert and demands $2 million for her safe return, on a short deadline of 3 hours. However, the culprit in "Crate 'n Burial" is after the money, not revenge, and the victim (Laura Garas) was initially an accomplice in a staged kidnapping. One scene from "Grave Danger" in particular, of Nick hammering on the lid of the coffin and screaming after he hears the dictaphone message, echoes a scene from the earlier episode, wherein the victim wakes up in a box, flicks on a lighter, and seeing her predicament, starts to scream wildly.

== Awards ==
Tarantino was nominated for the 2005 Primetime Emmy Award for Outstanding Directing for a Drama Series.

== Arc significance ==
This episode concludes the breakup of the team, ordered by Supervisor Conrad Ecklie. Ecklie initiated the dissolution as retribution against Grissom for allegedly mishandling an older case in the episode "Mea Culpa". Ecklie assigned Nick and Warrick to Catherine and Greg and Sara to Grissom. Upon Nick's placement on an ambulance, Grissom defiantly tells Ecklie, "I want my guys back!", to which Ecklie reluctantly agrees.

This episode also introduced viewers to Undersheriff Jeffrey McKeen (Conor O'Farrell).

== Home media releases ==
"Grave Danger" was already included as a double volume episode on the Season 5 DVD, then was offered as its own DVD broken up as a 2-parter just as on the original Season 5 boxset. It is now on Blu-ray/DVD combination in the original, complete film format in which it was originally broadcast minus the memorial dedication to Frank Gorshin who had died the day before the episode premiered on television.
