= List of American films of 1993 =

This is a list of American films released in 1993.

== Box office ==
The highest-grossing American films released in 1993, by domestic box office gross revenue, are as follows:

Highest-grossing films of 1993
Rank	Title	Distributor	Domestic gross
1	Jurassic Park	Universal	$357,067,947
2	Mrs. Doubtfire	20th Century Fox	$219,195,243
3	The Fugitive	Warner Bros.	$183,875,760
4	The Firm	Paramount	$158,348,367
5	Sleepless in Seattle	TriStar Pictures	$126,680,884
6	Indecent Proposal	Paramount	$106,614,059
7	In the Line of Fire	Columbia	$102,314,823
8	The Pelican Brief	Warner Bros.	$100,768,056
9	Schindler's List	Universal	$96,065,768
10	Cliffhanger	TriStar Pictures	$84,049,211

== January–March ==
Opening		Title	Production company	Cast and crew	Ref.
J A N U A R Y	8	Leprechaun	Trimark Pictures	Mark Jones (director/screenplay); Warwick Davis, Jennifer Aniston, Ken Olandt, Mark Holton, Robert Hy Gorman, Shay Duffin, John Sanderford, John Voldstad, Pamela Mant, William Newman, David Permenter, Raymond Turner, Heather Kennedy, Timothy Garrick, Alexandra Sachs, Brandon Sachs	
J A N U A R Y	15	Alive	Touchstone Pictures / Paramount Pictures / The Kennedy/Marshall Company	Frank Marshall (director); John Patrick Shanley (screenplay); Ethan Hawke, Vincent Spano, Josh Hamilton, John Malkovich, Danny Nucci, Josh Lucas, José Zúñiga, Illeana Douglas, Jerry Wasserman, John Haymes Newton, Bruce Ramsay, Jack Noseworthy, David Cubitt, John Cassini, Richard Ian Cox, Gordon Currie, Sam Behrens, Frank Pellegrino, Michael DeLorenzo, Chad Willett, Michael Woolson, Diana Barrington	
J A N U A R Y	15	Body of Evidence	Metro-Goldwyn-Mayer / Dino De Laurentiis Communications	Uli Edel (director); Brad Mirman (screenplay); Madonna, Willem Dafoe, Joe Mantegna, Anne Archer, Julianne Moore, Jürgen Prochnow, Frank Langella, Stan Shaw, Charles Hallahan, Lillian Lehman, Mark Rolston, Jeff Perry, Richard Riehle, Michael Forest, Corey Brunish, John Davis Chandler	
J A N U A R Y	15	Nowhere to Run	Columbia Pictures	Robert Harmon (director); Joe Eszterhas, Leslie Bohem, Randy Feldman (screenplay); Jean-Claude Van Damme, Rosanna Arquette, Kieran Culkin, Tiffany Taubman, Joss Ackland, Ted Levine, Edward Blatchford, Anthony Starke, James Greene	
J A N U A R Y	22	Aspen Extreme	Hollywood Pictures	Patrick Hasburgh (director/screenplay); Paul Gross, Peter Berg, Finola Hughes, Teri Polo, William Russ, Trevor Eve, Martin Kemp, Tony Griffin, William McNamara	
J A N U A R Y	22	Hexed	Columbia Pictures	Alan Spencer (director/screenplay); Arye Gross, Claudia Christian, Adrienne Shelly, R. Lee Ermey, Ray Baker, Michael E. Knight, Robin Curtis, Norman Fell	
J A N U A R Y	27	Guncrazy	First Look International	Tamra Davis (director); Matthew Bright (screenplay); Drew Barrymore, James LeGros, Billy Drago, Rodney Harvey, Joe Dallesandro, Michael Ironside, Robert Greenberg, Jeremy Davies, Ione Skye, James Oseland, Lawrence Steven Meyers, Dick Warlock, Michael Franco, Tracey Walter, Damon Jones, Harrison Young, Leo Lee, Dan Eisenstein, Herb Weld, Lee Mary Weilnau, Roger Jackson, Zane W. Levitt, Rowena Guinness	
J A N U A R Y	29	Children of the Corn II: The Final Sacrifice	Dimension Films	David Price (director); A.L. Katz, Gilbert Adler (screenplay); Terence Knox, Paul Scherrer, Ryan Bollman, Christie Clark, Rosalind Allen, Ned Romero, Ed Grady, Sean Bridgers, Aubrey Dollar	
J A N U A R Y	29	Matinee	Universal Pictures	Joe Dante (director); Charles S. Haas (screenplay); John Goodman, Cathy Moriarty, Simon Fenton, Omri Katz, Lisa Jakub, Kellie Martin, Jesse Lee, Lucinda Jenney, James Villemaire, Robert Picardo, Jesse White, Dick Miller, John Sayles, David Clennon, Lucy Butler, Belinda Balaski, Naomi Watts, Charles S. Haas, Archie Hahn, Mark McCracken, Luke Halpin, Marc Macaulay, Ike Pappas, Brett Rice, Chris M. Allport, Robert O. Cornthwaite, William Schallert, Kevin McCarthy, Joey Fatone, John F. Kennedy, Art Linkletter, Adlai Stevenson II, Valerian Zorin	
J A N U A R Y	29	Sniper	TriStar Pictures	Luis Llosa (director); Michael Frost Beckner, Crash Leyland (screenplay); Tom Berenger, Billy Zane, J. T. Walsh, Aden Young, Gary Swanson, Hank Garrett	
J A N U A R Y	30	Blind Side	HBO Pictures / Chestnut Hill Productions	Geoff Murphy (director); Stewart Lindh, Solomon Weingarten, John Carlen (screenplay); Rutger Hauer, Rebecca De Mornay, Ron Silver, Jonathan Banks, Mariska Hargitay, Tamara Clutterbuck, Jorge Cervera Jr., Josh Cruze, David Labiosa, Richard L. Duran, Bill Dance, Diane Hsu, Geoffrey Rivas, Joanna Sanchez, Del Zamora	
F E B R U A R Y	3	The Cemetery Club	Touchstone Pictures	Bill Duke (director); Ivan Menchell (screenplay); Ellen Burstyn, Olympia Dukakis, Diane Ladd, Danny Aiello, Lainie Kazan, Christina Ricci, Bernie Casey, Wallace Shawn, Catherine Keener	
F E B R U A R Y	3	Homeward Bound: The Incredible Journey	Walt Disney Pictures	Duwayne Dunham (director); Caroline Thompson, Linda Woolverton (screenplay); Michael J. Fox, Don Ameche, Sally Field, Robert Hays, Kim Greist, Veronica Lauren, Kevin Chevalia, Benj Thall, Jean Smart, Mark L. Taylor, William Edward Phipps, Ed Bernard, Kit McDonough, Gary Taylor, Bart the Bear, David MacIntyre, Caroll Spinney, Frank Welker	
F E B R U A R Y	5	National Lampoon's Loaded Weapon 1	New Line Cinema	Gene Quintano (director/screenplay); Don Holley, Tori Tellem (screenplay); Emilio Estevez, Samuel L. Jackson, Jon Lovitz, Tim Curry, Kathy Ireland, Frank McRae, William Shatner, Lance Kinsey, Denis Leary, F. Murray Abraham, Danielle Nicolet, Beverly Johnson, Ken Ober, Vito Scotti, Bill Nunn, Lin Shaye, James Doohan, Erik Estrada, Larry Wilcox, Corey Feldman, Paul Gleason, Jake Johannsen, Phil Hartman, Richard Moll, J.T. Walsh, Charles Napier, Charles Cyphers, Denise Richards, Allyce Beasley, Rick Ducommun, Dr. Joyce Brothers, Charlie Sheen, Whoopi Goldberg, Christopher Lambert, Bruce Mahler, Manny Perry, Robert Shaye, Bruce Willis	
F E B R U A R Y	5	Sommersby	Warner Bros. Pictures	Jon Amiel (director); Nicholas Meyer, Sarah Kernochan (screenplay); Richard Gere, Jodie Foster, Bill Pullman, James Earl Jones, Lanny Flaherty, William Windom, Clarice Taylor, Frankie Faison, R. Lee Ermey, Richard Hamilton, Maury Chaykin, Ray McKinnon, Muse Watson, Richard Lineback, Wendell Wellman, Brett Kelley	
F E B R U A R Y	5	The Vanishing	20th Century Fox	George Sluizer (director); Todd Graff (screenplay); Jeff Bridges, Kiefer Sutherland, Nancy Travis, Sandra Bullock, Park Overall, Maggie Linderman, Lisa Eichhorn, George Hearn, Lynn Hamilton	
F E B R U A R Y	7	I Yabba-Dabba Do!	ABC / H-B Production Co. / Turner Entertainment	William Hanna (director); Rich Fogel, Mark Seidenberg (screenplay); Henry Corden, Jean Vander Pyl, Megan Mullally, Frank Welker, B.J. Ward, Jerry Houser, Janet Waldo, John Stephenson	
F E B R U A R Y	12	Dead Alive	Oro Films / WingNut Films / Avalon Studios Limited / The New Zealand Film Commission	Peter Jackson (director/screenplay); Stephen Sinclair, Fran Walsh (screenplay); Timothy Balme, Diana Peñalver, Elizabeth Moody, Ian Watkin, Stuart Devenie, Stephen Papps, Jed Brophy, Harry Sinclair, Davina Whitehouse, Bill Ralston, Brian Sergent, Forrest J. Ackerman, Peter Vere-Jones, Peter Jackson, Elizabeth Brimilcombe, Brenda Kendall, Murray Keane, Glenis Levestam, Lewis Rowe, Elizabeth Mullane, Silvio Famularo, Daniel Sabic, Vicki Walker, Tich Rowney, Tony Hiles	
F E B R U A R Y	12	Groundhog Day	Columbia Pictures	Harold Ramis (director/screenplay); Danny Rubin (screenplay); Bill Murray, Andie MacDowell, Chris Elliott, Stephen Tobolowsky, Brian Doyle-Murray, Angela Paton, Rick Ducommun, Rick Overton, Robin Duke, Marita Geraghty, Harold Ramis, Richard Henzel, David Pasquesi, Hynden Walch, Michael Shannon, Ken Hudson Campbell	
F E B R U A R Y	12	Love Field	Orion Pictures	Jonathan Kaplan (director); Don Roos (screenplay); Michelle Pfeiffer, Dennis Haysbert, Brian Kerwin, Stephanie McFadden, Louise Latham, Peggy Rea, Beth Grant, Cooper Huckabee, Troy Evans, Mark Miller, Pearl Jones, Rhoda Griffis, Bob Gill, Nick Searcy, Joe Maggard	
F E B R U A R Y	12	Riff-Raff	Fine Line Features / Parallax Pictures / Channel Four Films	Ken Loach (director); Bill Jesse (screenplay); Robert Carlyle, Emer McCourt, Ricky Tomlinson, Jim R. Coleman, George Moss, Ade Sapara, Derek Young, Peter Mullan	
F E B R U A R Y	12	The Temp	Paramount Pictures	Tom Holland (director); Kevin Falls, Tom Engleman (screenplay); Timothy Hutton, Lara Flynn Boyle, Dwight Schultz, Oliver Platt, Steven Weber, Faye Dunaway, Colleen Flynn, Scott Coffey, Maura Tierney, Dakin Matthews, Lin Shaye, Michael Winters, Demene Hall, Jesse Vint	
F E B R U A R Y	12	Untamed Heart	Metro-Goldwyn-Mayer	Tony Bill (director); Tom Sierchio (screenplay); Marisa Tomei, Christian Slater, Rosie Perez, Kyle Secor, Willie Garson	
F E B R U A R Y	19	Army of Darkness	Universal Pictures	Sam Raimi (director/screenplay); Ivan Raimi (screenplay); Bruce Campbell, Embeth Davidtz, Marcus Gilbert, Ian Abercrombie, Richard Grove, Timothy Patrick Quill, Michael Earl Reid, Bridget Fonda, Patricia Tallman, Ted Raimi	
F E B R U A R Y	19	The Crying Game	Miramax Films	Neil Jordan (director/screenplay); Stephen Rea, Miranda Richardson, Jaye Davidson, Forest Whitaker, Adrian Dunbar, Tony Slattery, Jim Broadbent, Birdy Sweeney, Ralph Brown	
F E B R U A R Y	19	Mac	The Samuel Goldwyn Company	John Turturro (director/screenplay); Brandon Cole (screenplay); John Turturro, Michael Badalucco, Carl Capotorto, Katherine Borowitz, Ellen Barkin, John Amos, Nicholas Turturro, Matthew Sussman, Dennis Farina, Olek Krupa, Steven Randazzo, Mike Starr, Joe Paparone, Aida Turturro, Mario Todisco, Harry Bugin, Michael Imperioli	
F E B R U A R Y	20	Hostages	HBO Showcase / Granada Film Productions	David Wheatley (director); Bernard MacLaverty (screenplay); Kathy Bates, Colin Firth, Ciarán Hinds, Natasha Richardson, Jay O. Sanders, Josef Sommer, Harry Dean Stanton, Conrad Asquith, Colin Bruce, Colum Convey, Stephen Dillane, Harry Ditson, Tony Doyle, Amir M. Korangy, Rosaleen Linehan, Ruth McCabe, Brian McGrath, Juliano Mer-Khamis, Patrick Pearson, John Pickles, Raad Rawi, Sami Samir, Rolf Saxon, Colin Stinton, Dan Turgeman, Rasan Abbas	
F E B R U A R Y	26	The Abyss (Special Edition) (re-release)	20th Century Fox	James Cameron (director/screenplay); Ed Harris, Mary Elizabeth Mastrantonio, Michael Biehn, Leo Burmester, Todd Graff, John Bedford Lloyd, Kimberly Scott, Chris Elliott, Richard Warlock, J. Kenneth Campbell, William Wisher Jr., Ken Jenkins, Michael Beach, Brad Sullivan, Frank Lloyd, Joe Farago, Thomas F. Duffy, Michael Chapman, Daren Dochterman, Mikhail Gorbachev, J.C. Quinn, Captain "Kidd" Brewer Jr., George Robert Klek, Christopher Murphy, Adam Nelson, Jimmie Ray Weeks	
F E B R U A R Y	26	El Mariachi	Columbia Pictures / Los Hooligans Productions	Robert Rodriguez (director/screenplay); Carlos Gallardo, Peter Marquardt, Edith González, Consuelo Gómez, Reinol Martínez, Jaime de Hoyos, Ramiro Gómez, Jesús López Viejo, Luis Baro, Óscar Fabila	
F E B R U A R Y	26	Falling Down	Warner Bros. Pictures	Joel Schumacher (director); Ebbe Roe Smith (screenplay); Michael Douglas, Robert Duvall, Barbara Hershey, Rachel Ticotin, Tuesday Weld, Frederic Forrest, Lois Smith, Joey Hope Singer, Michael Paul Chan, Raymond J. Barry, D.W. Moffett, Steve Park, James Keane, Karina Arroyave, Brent Hinkley, Dedee Pfeiffer, Vondie Curtis-Hall, Kimberly Scott, Macon McCalman, Richard Montoya, James Morrison, John Fleck, Russell Curry, John Fink, Jack Kehoe, Jack Betts, Al Mancini, John Diehl, Amy Morton, Susie Singer Carter, Wayne Duvall, Marlo Thomas	
F E B R U A R Y	26	The Last Days of Chez Nous	Fine Line Features / Umbrella Entertainment	Gillian Armstrong (director); Helen Garner (screenplay); Lisa Harrow, Bruno Ganz, Kerry Fox, Miranda Otto, Kiri Paramore, Bill Hunter, Lex Marinos, Mickey Camilleri, Lynne Murphy, Claire Haywood, Leanne Bundy, Wilson Alcorn	
M A R C H	5	Amos & Andrew	Columbia Pictures / Castle Rock Entertainment	E. Max Frye (director/screenplay); Nicolas Cage, Samuel L. Jackson, Dabney Coleman, Brad Dourif, Michael Lerner, Margaret Colin, Giancarlo Esposito, Tracey Walter, Loretta Devine, Bob Balaban, Chelcie Ross, Ron Taylor, Jeff Blumenkrantz, Jordan Lund, Jodi Long	
M A R C H	5	Best of the Best 2	20th Century Fox	Robert Radler (director); Max Strom, John Allen Nelson (screenplay); Eric Roberts, Phillip Rhee	
M A R C H	5	Mad Dog and Glory	Universal Pictures	John McNaughton (director); Richard Price (screenplay); Robert De Niro, Uma Thurman, Bill Murray, David Caruso, Kathy Baker, Mike Starr, Tom Towles, Anthony Cannata, J.J. Johnston, Jack Wallace, Richard Belzer, Bruce Jarchow, Richard Price	
M A R C H	5	Rich in Love	Metro-Goldwyn-Mayer	Bruce Beresford (director); Alfred Uhry (screenplay); Albert Finney, Jill Clayburgh, Kathryn Erbe, Kyle MacLachlan, Piper Laurie, Ethan Hawke, Suzy Amis, Alfre Woodard	
M A R C H	5	Shadow of the Wolf	Triumph Releasing Corporation / Canal+ / Eiffel Productions	Jacques Dorfmann (director/screenplay); Pierre Magny (director); Evan Jones, David Milhaud, Rudy Wurlitzer (screenplay); Lou Diamond Phillips, Toshiro Mifune, Jennifer Tilly, Bernard-Pierre Donnadieu, Donald Sutherland, Nicholas Campbell, Raoul Trujillo, Qalingo Tookalak, Jobie Arnaituk, Tamussie Sivuarapik, Harry Hill	
M A R C H	5	Swing Kids	Hollywood Pictures	Thomas Carter (director); Jonathan Marc Feldman (screenplay); Robert Sean Leonard, Christian Bale, Frank Whaley, Barbara Hershey, Tushka Bergen, David Tom, Julia Stemberger, Kenneth Branagh, Noah Wyle, Jessica Hynes, Martin Clunes, Jayce Bartok	
M A R C H	12	CB4	Universal Pictures / Imagine Entertainment	Tamra Davis (director); Chris Rock, Nelson George, Robert LoCash (screenplay); Chris Rock, Allen Payne, Deezer D, Chris Elliott, Phil Hartman, Charlie Murphy, Khandi Alexander, Art Evans, Theresa Randle, Willard E. Pugh, Ty Granderson Jones, Rachel True, Victor Wilson, Richard Gant, J.D. Daniels, Stoney Jackson, Isaac Hayes, LaWanda Page, Shar Jackson, Vanessa Lee Chester, Lance Crouther, Shirley Hemphill, Renee Tenison, Rosie Tenison, Ice-T, Halle Berry, Ice Cube, Flavor Flav, Shaquille O'Neal, Eazy-E, Butthole Surfers, Tommy Davidson	
M A R C H	12	A Far Off Place	Walt Disney Pictures / Amblin Entertainment	Mikael Salomon (director); Laurens van der Post, Robert Caswell, Jonathan Hensleigh, Sally Robinson (screenplay); Reese Witherspoon, Ethan Randall, Jack Thompson, Maximilian Schell, Sarel Bok, Robert John Burke, Patricia Kalember, Daniel Gerroll, Miles Anderson, Taffy Chihota, Magdalene Damas	
M A R C H	12	Fire in the Sky	Paramount Pictures	Robert Lieberman (director); Tracy Tormé (screenplay); D. B. Sweeney, Robert Patrick, Craig Sheffer, Peter Berg, James Garner, Henry Thomas, Bradley Gregg, Kathleen Wilhoite, Georgia Emelin, Scott MacDonald, Noble Willingham	
M A R C H	19	Just Another Girl on the I.R.T.	Miramax Films / Live Entertainment	Leslie Harris (director/screenplay); Ariyan A. Johnson, Kevin Thigpen, Ebony Jerido, Chequita Jackson, Jerard Washington, Tony Wilkes, Karen Robinson, Johnny Roses, Kisha Richardson, Monet Cherise Dunham, Wendell Moore, William Badgett	
M A R C H	19	Point of No Return	Warner Bros. Pictures	John Badham (director); Robert Getchell, Alexandra Seros (screenplay); Bridget Fonda, Gabriel Byrne, Dermot Mulroney, Anne Bancroft, Harvey Keitel, Miguel Ferrer, Olivia d'Abo, Richard Romanus, Geoffrey Lewis, Michael Rapaport, Lorraine Toussaint, Lieux Dressler, John Capodice, Carmen Zapata, Calvin Levels, James Handy, François Chau, Jodie Markell, John Badham, Leon Herbert	
M A R C H	19	Teenage Mutant Ninja Turtles III	New Line Cinema / 20th Century Fox	Stuart Gillard (director/screenplay); Elias Koteas, Paige Turco, Vivian Wu, Sab Shimono, Stuart Wilson, John Aylward, Brian Tochi, Corey Feldman, Tim Kelleher, Robbie Rist, James Murray, Mark Caso, Jim Martin, Matt Hill, Noel MacNeal, Hosung Pak, Allan Shishir Inocalla, Mak Takano, Henry Hayashi, Travis A. Moon, David Fraser, Jim Raposa, Larry Lam, Rob Mills, Steven Ho, Gordon Robertson, Lisa Sturz, Tim Lawrence	
M A R C H	20	Barbarians at the Gate	HBO Pictures	Glenn Jordan (director); Larry Gelbart (screenplay); James Garner, Jonathan Pryce, Peter Riegert, Joanna Cassidy, Fred Dalton Thompson, Leilani Sarelle, Matt Clark, Jeffrey DeMunn, David Rasche, Tom Aldredge, Graham Beckel, Peter Dvorsky, Peter Frechette, Raye Birk, Ron Canada, Bruce French, Mark Harelik, Rosanna Huffman, Joseph Kell, Dean Norris, Phil Reeves, Nancy Stephens, Timothy Stickney, Kent Williams, Rita Wilson, Dick Cavett, Tom Brokaw, Matthew Labyorteaux	
M A R C H	26	Born Yesterday	Hollywood Pictures	Luis Mandoki (director); Douglas McGrath (screenplay); Melanie Griffith, John Goodman, Don Johnson, Edward Herrmann, Max Perlich, Michael Ensign, Benjamin C. Bradlee, Sally Quinn, William Frankfather, Fred Dalton Thompson, Celeste Yarnall, Nora Dunn, Meg Wittner, Mary Gordon Murray, Ted Raimi, Rondi Reed, Drew Snyder, Terri Hanauer, Ann Hearn, Selma Archerd, Freda Foh Shen, Mary Kay Adams, William Forward, Matthew Faison, Kate McGregor-Stewart, John Wesley, Andi Chapman, John Achorn	
M A R C H	26	Hear No Evil	20th Century Fox	Robert Greenwald (director); R.M. Badat, Danny Rubin, Kathleen Rowell (screenplay); Marlee Matlin, D. B. Sweeney, Martin Sheen, John C. McGinley	
M A R C H	26	Married to It	Orion Pictures	Arthur Hiller (director); Janet Kovalcik (screenplay); Beau Bridges, Stockard Channing, Robert Sean Leonard, Mary Stuart Masterson, Cybill Shepherd, Ron Silver, Don Francks, Donna Vivino, Diane D'Aquila, Chris Wiggins, Paul Gross, Gerry Bamman, Djanet Sears, George Guidall, Chris Bickford, Phillip Akin, Gregory Jbara, Aaron Ashmore, Shawn Ashmore, Kelly Campbell, Tara Charendoff, Ed Koch	
M A R C H	26	The Opposite Sex and How to Live with Them	Miramax Films	Matthew Meshekoff (director); Noah Stern (screenplay); Courteney Cox, Arye Gross, Kevin Pollak, Julie Brown, Mitchell Ryan, Mitzi McCall, B.J. Ward, Philip Bruns, Jack Carter, Aaron Lustig, Connie Sawyer, Steven Brill, Davis Guggenheim, John DeMita, Lisa Waltz, Kimberlin Brown, Justin Shenkarow, Jensen Daggett, Amanda Foreman, Larry Poindexter, Johnny Most	

== April–June ==
Opening		Title	Production company	Cast and crew	Ref.
A P R I L	2	The Adventures of Huck Finn	Walt Disney Pictures	Stephen Sommers (director/screenplay); Elijah Wood, Courtney B. Vance, Robbie Coltrane, Jason Robards, Ron Perlman, Dana Ivey, Anne Heche, James Gammon, Paxton Whitehead, Tom Aldredge, Laura Bundy, Curtis Armstrong, Mary Louise Wilson, Frances Conroy, Danny Tamberelli, Mickey Cassidy, Renee O'Connor, Leon Russom, Garette Ratliff Henson, Gerald McKenzie, Stephen Sommers, Archie Moore	
A P R I L	2	Cop and a Half	Universal Pictures / Imagine Entertainment	Henry Winkler (director); Arne Olsen (screenplay); Burt Reynolds, Norman D. Golden II, Ruby Dee, Holland Taylor, Ray Sharkey, Sean Evan O'Neal, Frank Sivero, Marc Macaulay, Tom McCleister, Ralph Wilcox, Max Winkler, Steve Carlisle, Maria Canals, Amanda Seales, Ossie Davis, Susan Gallagher, Sammy Hernandez, Rocky Giordani, Tom Kouchalakos, Carmine Genovese	
A P R I L	2	The Crush	Warner Bros. Pictures / Morgan Creek Productions	Alan Shapiro (director/screenplay); Cary Elwes, Alicia Silverstone, Jennifer Rubin, Kurtwood Smith, Gwynyth Walsh, Amber Benson, Matt Walker	
A P R I L	2	Jack the Bear	20th Century Fox	Marshall Herskovitz (director); Steven Zaillian (screenplay); Danny DeVito, Robert J. Steinmiller Jr., Miko Hughes, Gary Sinise, Art LaFleur, Stefan Gierasch, Erica Yohn, Andrea Marcovicci, Julia Louis-Dreyfus, Reese Witherspoon, Bert Remsen, Carl Gabriel Yorke, Lee Garlington, Lorinne Vozoff, Justin Mosley Spink, Christopher Lawford, Sam Freed, Dorothy Lyman, Donovan Leitch, Scott Thomson, Monica Calhoun, Kelly Connell, Jerry Nelson	
A P R I L	4	When a Stranger Calls Back	Showtime / Universal Television	Fred Walton (director/screenplay); Carol Kane, Charles Durning, Jill Schoelen, Gene Lythgow, Kevin McNulty, Cheryl Wilson, Jerry Wasserman, Terence Kelly, Gary Jones, Babz Chula	
A P R I L	7	Indecent Proposal	Paramount Pictures	Adrian Lyne (director); Amy Holden Jones (screenplay); Robert Redford, Demi Moore, Woody Harrelson, Seymour Cassel, Oliver Platt, Billy Bob Thornton, Rip Taylor, Billy Connolly, Joel Brooks, Pamela Holt, Tommy Bush, Mariclare Costello, Joseph Ruskin, Lydia Nicole, Iqbal Theba, Elsa Raven, Chi Muoi Lo, Selma Archerd, Sheena Easton, Herbie Hancock	
A P R I L	7	The Sandlot	20th Century Fox	David Mickey Evans (director/screenplay); Robert Gunter (screenplay); Tom Guiry, Mike Vitar, Patrick Renna, Chauncey Leopardi, Marty York, Brandon Q. Adams, Grant Gelt, Shane Obedzinski, Victor DiMattia, Denis Leary, Karen Allen, James Earl Jones, Marley Shelton, Art LaFleur, Wil Horneff, David Mickey Evans, Pablo Vitar	
A P R I L	9	Bodies, Rest & Motion	Fine Line Features	Michael Steinberg (director); Roger Hedden (screenplay); Phoebe Cates, Bridget Fonda, Tim Roth, Eric Stoltz, Alicia Witt, Peter Fonda, Scott Johnson, Jon Proudstar, Warren Burton	
A P R I L	9	Sidekicks	Triumph Films	Aaron Norris (director); Lou Illar, Galen Thompson (screenplay); Beau Bridges, Joe Piscopo, Jonathan Brandis, Mako, Julia Nickson-Soul, Danica McKellar, Richard Moll, Chuck Norris, John Buchanan, Gerrit Graham, Eric Norris	
A P R I L	10	The Positively True Adventures of the Alleged Texas Cheerleader-Murdering Mom	HBO Pictures	Michael Ritchie (director); Jane Anderson (screenplay); Holly Hunter, Beau Bridges, Swoosie Kurtz, Elizabeth Ruscio, Gregg Henry, Matt Frewer, Eddie Jones, Frankie Ingrassia, Gary Grubbs, Jack Kehler, Frederick Koehler, O'Neal Compton, Steve Eastin, Andy Richter, Giovanni Ribisi, Michael Ritchie, Richard Schiff, Noni White, James Manos Jr., Jane Anderson, Charlie O'Donnell, Harley Tat, Phil Donahue, Johnny Carson, George H. W. Bush	
A P R I L	16	Benny & Joon	Metro-Goldwyn-Mayer	Jeremiah S. Chechik (director); Barry Berman, Lesley McNeil (screenplay); Johnny Depp, Mary Stuart Masterson, Aidan Quinn, Julianne Moore, Oliver Platt, Dan Hedaya, CCH Pounder, Joe Grifasi, William H. Macy, Liane Curtis, Eileen Ryan	
A P R I L	16	Boiling Point	Warner Bros. Pictures	James B. Harris (director/screenplay); Gerald Petievich (screenplay); Wesley Snipes, Dennis Hopper, Lolita Davidovich, Viggo Mortensen, Seymour Cassel, Dan Hedaya, Jonathan Banks, Christine Elise, Tony Lo Bianco, Valerie Perrine, James Tolkan, Paul Gleason, Tobin Bell, Bobby Hosea, Lorraine Evanoff, Stephanie E. Williams, George Gerdes, James Pickens Jr., Nancy Sullivan, Jophery C. Brown	
A P R I L	16	Wide Sargasso Sea	New Line Cinema	John Duigan (director/screenplay); Carole Angier, Jan Sharp (screenplay); Karina Lombard, Nathaniel Parker, Rachel Ward, Michael York, Martine Beswick, Claudia Robinson, Huw Christie Williams, Casey Berna, Rowena King, Ben Thomas, Naomi Watts	
A P R I L	16	No Place to Hide	Cannon Pictures Inc.	Richard Danus (director/screenplay); Kris Kristofferson, Drew Barrymore, Martin Landau, O. J. Simpson, Dey Young, Bruce Weitz	
A P R I L	23	The Dark Half	Orion Pictures	George A. Romero (director/screenplay); Timothy Hutton, Amy Madigan, Michael Rooker, Julie Harris, Robert Joy, Chelsea Field, Royal Dano, Rutanya Alda, Beth Grant, Kent Broadhurst, Tom Mardirosian, Glenn Colerider	
A P R I L	23	Indian Summer	Touchstone Pictures	Mike Binder (director/screenplay); Alan Arkin, Matt Craven, Diane Lane, Bill Paxton, Elizabeth Perkins, Kevin Pollak, Sam Raimi, Vincent Spano, Julie Warner, Kimberly Williams	
A P R I L	23	Map of the Human Heart	Miramax Films / Working Title Films / PolyGram Filmed Entertainment	Vincent Ward (director); Louis Nowra (screenplay); Jason Scott Lee, Anne Parillaud, Patrick Bergin, Clotilde Courau, John Cusack, Jeanne Moreau, Ben Mendelsohn, Jerry Snell, Monique Spaziani, Anik Matern, Charlotte Coleman, Robert Joamie, Annie Gailpeau, Jayko Pitseolak, Reepah Arreak	
A P R I L	23	This Boy's Life	Warner Bros. Pictures	Michael Caton-Jones (director); Robert Getchell (screenplay); Robert De Niro, Ellen Barkin, Leonardo DiCaprio, Jonah Blechman, Eliza Dushku, Chris Cooper, Carla Gugino, Zack Ansley, Tracey Ellis, Kathy Kinney, Tobey Maguire, Sean Murray, Lee Wilkof, Bill Dow, Deanna Milligan	
A P R I L	23	Who's the Man?	New Line Cinema	Ted Demme (director); Seth Greenland (screenplay); Doctor Dré, Ed Lover, Badja Djola, Salt, Colin Quinn, Denis Leary, Bernie Mac, Terrence Howard, Richard Gant, Guru, Ice-T, Larry Cedar, Jim Moody, Joe Lisi, Karen Duffy, Roger Robinson, Richard Bright, Rozwill Young, Vinny Pastore, Caron Bernstein, Angelo Montagnese, Michael Giordano, Kim Chan	
A P R I L	30	Bound By Honor	Hollywood Pictures	Taylor Hackford (director); Jimmy Santiago Baca, Jeremy Iacone, Floyd Mutrux (screenplay); Jesse Borrego, Benjamin Bratt, Enrique Castillo, Damian Chapa, Delroy Lindo, Victor Rivers, Tom Towles, Carlos Carrasco, Theodore Wilson, Raymond Cruz, Valente Rodriguez, Lanny Flaherty, Billy Bob Thornton, Danny Trejo, Victor Mohica, Luis Contreras, Ving Rhames, Richard Masur, Thomas F. Wilson, Lupe Ontiveros	
A P R I L	30	The Night We Never Met	Miramax Films	Warren Leight (director/screenplay); Matthew Broderick, Annabella Sciorra, Kevin Anderson, Jeanne Tripplehorn, Justine Bateman, Christine Baranski, Doris Roberts, Dominic Chianese, Tim Guinee, Bradley White, Greg Germann, Dana Wheeler-Nicholson, Louise Lasser, Bill Campbell, Michelle Hurst, Lewis Black, Ranjit Chowdhry, Naomi Campbell, Richard Poe, Katharine Houghton, Brooke Smith, Bitty Schram, Catherine Lloyd Burns, Michael Imperioli, Paul Guilfoyle, Kathryn Rossetter, Suzanne Lanza, Garry Shandling	
A P R I L	30	The Pickle	Columbia Pictures	Paul Mazursky (director/screenplay); Danny Aiello, Dyan Cannon, Clotilde Courau, Shelley Winters, Barry Miller, Jerry Stiller, Chris Penn, Little Richard, Jodi Long, Rebecca Miller, Stephen Tobolowsky, Caroline Aaron, Rita Karin, Linda Carlson, Kimiko Cazanov, Ally Sheedy, J.D. Daniels, Spalding Gray, Elya Baskin, Michael Greene, Robert Cicchini, John Rothman, Castulo Guerra, Arthur Taxier, Paul Mazursky, Michael Shulman, Ben Diskin, Geoffrey Blake, Eric Edwards, Stephen Polk, Arthur French, Erik King, Lawrence Gilliard Jr., Brooke Smith, Andre Philippe, Fyvush Finkel, Twink Caplan, Griffin Dunne, Dudley Moore	
A P R I L	30	Splitting Heirs	Universal Pictures	Robert Young (director); Eric Idle (screenplay); Eric Idle, Rick Moranis, Barbara Hershey, Catherine Zeta-Jones, John Cleese, Sadie Frost, Stratford Johns, Brenda Bruce, William Franklyn, Richard Huw, Charu Bala Chokshi, Jeremy Clyde, Eric Sykes	
A P R I L	30	Three of Hearts	New Line Cinema	Yurek Bogayevicz (director); Adam Greenman (screenplay); William Baldwin, Kelly Lynch, Sherilyn Fenn, Joe Pantoliano, Gail Strickland, Cec Verrell, Claire Callaway, Marek Johnson, Monique Mannen, Timothy Stickney, Frank Ray Perilli, Tony Amendola, Keith MacKechnie, Ann Ryerson, Gloria Gifford	
M A Y	7	American Heart	Triton Pictures	Martin Bell (director/screenplay); Peter Silverman, Mary Ellen Mark (screenplay); Jeff Bridges, Edward Furlong, Lucinda Jenney, Tracey Kapisky, Don Harvey	
M A Y	7	Dave	Warner Bros. Pictures	Ivan Reitman (director); Gary Ross (screenplay); Kevin Kline, Sigourney Weaver, Frank Langella, Kevin Dunn, Ving Rhames, Ben Kingsley, Charles Grodin, Faith Prince, Laura Linney, Tom Dugan, Stephen Root, Ralph Manza, Bonnie Hunt, Anna Deavere Smith, Charles Hallahan, Stefan Gierasch, Parley Baer, Steve Witting, Senator Christopher Dodd, Senator Tom Harkin, Senator Howard Metzenbaum, Justice Abner J. Mikva, Thomas P. "Tip" O'Neill, Senator Paul Simon, Senator Alan Simpson, Fred Barnes, Ronald Brownstein, Eleanor Clift, Bernard Kalb, Larry King, Michael Kinsley, Morton Kondracke, Jay Leno, Frank Mankiewicz, Chris Matthews, John McLaughlin, Robert D. Novak, Richard Reeves, Arnold Schwarzenegger, Ben Stein, Oliver Stone, Kathleen Sullivan, Jeff Tackett, Helen Thomas, Nina Totenberg, Sander Vanocur, John Yang, Catherine Reitman, Sarah Marshall, George Martin, Jason Reitman, Peter White, Robin Gammell, Gary Ross, Bonnie Bartlett, Dan Butler, Wendy Gordon, Ben Patrick Johnson, Steve Kmetko	
M A Y	7	Dragon: The Bruce Lee Story	Universal Pictures	Rob Cohen (director/screenplay); John Raffo, Edward Khmara (screenplay); Jason Scott Lee, Lauren Holly, Robert Wagner, Michael Learned, Nancy Kwan, Lim Kay Tong, Ric Young, Luoyong Wang, Sven-Ole Thorsen, Eric Bruskotter, Aki Aleong, Chao-Li Chi, Clyde Kusatsu, Michael Cudlitz, Forry Smith, Van Williams, Ed Parker Jr., Shannon Lee, Lala Sloatman, Louis Turenne, Paul Mantee, Jonathan Penner, Rob Cohen	
M A Y	7	Much Ado About Nothing	The Samuel Goldwyn Company	Kenneth Branagh (director/screenplay); Kenneth Branagh, Michael Keaton, Robert Sean Leonard, Keanu Reeves, Emma Thompson, Denzel Washington, Kate Beckinsale, Richard Briers, Gerard Horan, Imelda Staunton, Brian Blessed, Ben Elton, Jimmy Yuill, Richard Clifford, Phyllida Law, Patrick Doyle	
M A Y	8	Daybreak	HBO Showcase	Stephen Tolkin (director/screenplay); Moira Kelly, Cuba Gooding Jr., Martha Plimpton, Omar Epps, Amir Williams, David Eigenberg, Alice Drummond, John Cameron Mitchell, Willie Garson, Mark Boone Junior, Deirdre O'Connell, Jon Seda, Phil Parolisi, Paul Butler, Alix Koromzay, Charles Cragin, Novella Nelson, Charles 'Soll Food' Mattocks, Nick Chinlund, Stuart Rudin, Skipp Sudduth, Tim Guinee, Phil Hartman, John Savage	
M A Y	9	Stephen King's The Tommyknockers	ABC	John Power (director); Lawrence D. Cohen (screenplay); Jimmy Smits, Marg Helgenberger, E.G. Marshall, John Ashton, Allyce Beasley, Robert Carradine, Joanna Cassidy, Annie Corley, Cliff De Young, Traci Lords, Chuck Henry, Paul McIver, Yvonne Lawley, John Sumner, Elizabeth Hawthorne, Craig Parker, Alan Rosenberg, Leon Woods, Bill Johnson, Karyn Malchus	
M A Y	14	Carnosaur	New Horizon Picture Corp	Adam Simon (director/screenplay); Diane Ladd, Raphael Sbarge, Jennifer Runyon, Harrison Page, Ned Bellamy, Clint Howard, Frank Novak, Ed Williams, Brent Hinkley, Martha Hackett, George Perez, Rodman Flender	
M A Y	14	Excessive Force	New Line Cinema / 3 Arts Entertainment / Ian Page Productions	Jon Hess (director); Thomas Ian Griffith (screenplay); Thomas Ian Griffith, Charlotte Lewis, Lance Henriksen, James Earl Jones, Tony Todd, Tom Hodges, Danny Goldring, Ian Gomez, Burt Young, W. Earl Brown, Antoni Corone, Carl Ciarfalio, Richard Mawe, Christopher Garbrecht, Sam Sanders, Tom Milanovich, Randy Popplewell, Paula Anglin, Susan Wood, Brian Leahy	
M A Y	14	Lost in Yonkers	Columbia Pictures / Rastar Productions	Martha Coolidge (director); Neil Simon (screenplay); Richard Dreyfuss, Mercedes Ruehl, Irene Worth, Brad Stoll, Mike Damus, David Strathairn, Robert Miranda, Jack Laufer, Susan Merson, Illya Haase, Jesse Vincent, Lori Schubeler, Jean Zarzour, Mary Scott Gudaitis	
M A Y	14	Posse	Gramercy Pictures	Mario Van Peebles (director); Sy Richardson, Dario Scardapane (screenplay); Mario Van Peebles, Stephen Baldwin, Billy Zane, Tone Lōc, Melvin Van Peebles, Tommy "Tiny" Lister Jr., Big Daddy Kane, Reginald VelJohnson, Blair Underwood, Isaac Hayes, Charles Lane, Robert Hooks, Richard Jordan, Pam Grier, Nipsey Russell, Paul Bartel, Salli Richardson, Woody Strode, Aaron Neville, Reginald Hudlin, Warrington Hudlin, Richard Gant, Richard Edson, Stephen J. Cannell, Vesta, Faizon Love, Scott Bray, T.J. McClain	
M A Y	21	Hot Shots! Part Deux	20th Century Fox	Jim Abrahams (director/screenplay); Pat Proft (screenplay); Charlie Sheen, Lloyd Bridges, Valeria Golino, Richard Crenna, Brenda Bakke, Miguel Ferrer, Rowan Atkinson, Jerry Haleva, David Wohl, Mitchell Ryan, Michael Colyar, Ryan Stiles, Ben Lemon, Bob Vila, James Lew, Gerald Okamura, Chi Muoi Lo, Ron Pitts, Kelly Connell, Wayne Satz, Joseph V. Perry, Judith Kahan, Shaun Toub, Nancy Steen, Raye Hollitt, Andreas Katsulas, Clyde Kusatsu, Gregory Sierra, George H. W. Bush, Jimmy Carter, Gerald Ford, Arsenio Hall, Loren Janes, Al Leong, Richard Nixon, Martin Sheen	
M A Y	21	Sliver	Paramount Pictures	Phillip Noyce (director); Joe Eszterhas (screenplay); Sharon Stone, William Baldwin, Tom Berenger, Polly Walker, Colleen Camp, Amanda Foreman, Martin Landau, Nicholas Pryor, C.C.H. Pounder, Nina Foch, Keene Curtis, Tony Peck, Jim Beaver, Victor Brandt, Ryan Cutrona, Robert Miano, Steve Eastin, Sandy Gutman, Marnette Patterson	
M A Y	26	Menace II Society	New Line Cinema	The Hughes Brothers (director); Tyger Williams (screenplay); Tyrin Turner, Jada Pinkett, Larenz Tate, Samuel L. Jackson, MC Eiht, Glenn Plummer, Clifton Powell, Arnold Johnson, Pooh-Man, Too Short, Khandi Alexander, Bill Duke, Charles S. Dutton, Brandon Hammond, Saafir, Samuel Monroe Jr., Corey Roska, Clifton Collins Jr., Michael Edward McGuinn, Based Dub.	
M A Y	28	Cliffhanger	TriStar Pictures / Carolco Pictures	Renny Harlin (director); Michael France, Sylvester Stallone (screenplay); Sylvester Stallone, John Lithgow, Michael Rooker, Janine Turner, Rex Linn, Caroline Goodall, Leon, Craig Fairbrass, Gregory Scott Cummins, Denis Forest, Michelle Joyner, Paul Winfield, Ralph Waite, Max Perlich, Trey Brownell, Zach Grenier, Vyto Ruginis, Don S. Davis, Scott Hoxby, John Finn, Bruce McGill, Rosemary Dunsmore, Jeff McCarthy	
M A Y	28	Happily Ever After	Filmation Associates	John Howley (director); Robby London, Martha Moran (screenplay); Irene Cara, Edward Asner, Carol Channing, Dom DeLuise, Phyllis Diller, Michael Horton, Zsa Zsa Gabor, Linda Gary, Jonathan Harris, Sally Kellerman, Malcolm McDowell, Tracey Ullman, Frank Welker	
M A Y	28	Like Water for Chocolate	Miramax Films	Alfonso Arau (director); Laura Esquivel (screenplay); Marco Leonardi, Lumi Cavazos, Regina Torne, Ada Carrasco, Mario Ivan Martinez, Yareli Arizmendi, Claudette Maillé, Joaquin Garrido, Margarita Isabel, David Ostrosky, Brigida Alexander, Arcelia Ramirez	
M A Y	28	The Long Day Closes	British Film Institute / Film Four International	Terence Davies (director/screenplay); Marjorie Yates, Leigh McCormack, Anthony Watson, Nicholas Lamont, Ayse Owens, Tina Malone, Jimmy Wilde, Robin Polley, Pete Ivatts, Joy Blakeman, Denise Thomas, Patricia Morrison, Gavin Mawdslay, Kirk McLaughlin, Marcus Heath	
M A Y	28	Made in America	Warner Bros. Pictures	Richard Benjamin (director); Marcia Brandwynne, Nadine Schiff, Holly Goldberg Sloan (screenplay); Whoopi Goldberg, Ted Danson, Will Smith, Nia Long, Jennifer Tilly, Paul Rodriguez, Peggy Rea, Clyde Kusatsu, David Bowe, Charlene Fernetz, Shawn Levy, Phyllis Avery, Frances Bergen, O'Neal Compton, Mel Stewart	
M A Y	28	Super Mario Bros.	Hollywood Pictures / Lightmotive/Allied Filmmakers	Rocky Morton, Annabel Jankel (directors); Parker Bennett, Terry Runté, Ed Solomon (screenplay); Bob Hoskins, John Leguizamo, Dennis Hopper, Samantha Mathis, Fisher Stevens, Richard Edson, Fiona Shaw, Mojo Nixon, Dana Kaminski, Francesca P. Roberts, Gianni Russo, Don Lake, Lance Henriksen, Frank Welker, Dan Castellaneta	
J U N E	4	Guilty as Sin	Hollywood Pictures	Sidney Lumet (director); Larry Cohen (screenplay); Rebecca De Mornay, Don Johnson, Stephen Lang, Jack Warden, Luis Guzman, Dana Ivey, Ron White, Norma Dell'Agnese	
J U N E	4	A Heart in Winter	October Films	Claude Sautet (director/screenplay); Jacques Fieschi (screenplay); Daniel Auteuil, Emmanuelle Béart, André Dussollier, Élizabeth Bourgine, Myriam Boyer, Brigitte Catillon, Maurice Garrel, Jean-Luc Bideau	
J U N E	4	Life with Mikey	Touchstone Pictures	James Lapine (director); Marc Lawrence (screenplay); Michael J. Fox, Nathan Lane, Cyndi Lauper, Christina Vidal, David Krumholtz, David Huddleston, Tim Progosh, Victor Garber, Paula Garcés, Mary Alice, Kathryn Grody, Sean Power, Heather MacRae, Blake McGrath, Rubén Blades, Aida Turturro, Christine Baranski, Kevin Zegers, Mandy Patinkin, Frances Chaney, Annabelle Gurwitch, Tony Hendra, Michael Rupert, Laura Bell Bundy, Christopher Durang, Barbara Walsh, Wendy Wasserstein, Dylan Baker, Kate Burton, Stephen Bogardus, Robin Byrd, Hrant Alianak, Jerry Lawler, Jeff Jarrett, Sandra Caldwell, Jacob Reynolds, Andrew Leeds, Betty	
J U N E	4	The Music of Chance	IRS Media	Philip Haas (director/screenplay); Paul Auster, Belinda Haas (screenplay); James Spader, Mandy Patinkin, M. Emmet Walsh, Charles Durning, Joel Grey, Samantha Mathis, Chris Penn, Paul Auster	
J U N E	4	Nothing but a Man	Cinema V	Michael Roemer (director/screenplay); Robert M. Young (screenplay); Ivan Dixon, Abbey Lincoln, Yaphet Kotto, Leonard Parker, Stanley Green, Eugene Wood, Helen Lounck, Julius Harris, Gloria Foster, Gertrude Jeannette, Tom Ligon, William Jordan	
J U N E	9	Orlando	Sony Pictures Classics	Sally Potter (director/screenplay); Tilda Swinton, Billy Zane, Lothaire Bluteau, John Wood, Charlotte Valandrey, Heathcote Williams, Quentin Crisp, Jimmy Somerville, Dudley Sutton, Simon Russell Beale, Matthew Sim, Toby Stephens, Oleg Pogudin, Thom Hoffman	
J U N E	11	Equinox	IRS Media	Alan Rudolph (director/screenplay); Matthew Modine, Lara Flynn Boyle, Fred Ward, Tyra Ferrell, Marisa Tomei, Kevin J. O'Connor, Tate Donovan, Lori Singer, M. Emmet Walsh, Gailard Sartain, Tony Genaro, Dirk Blocker, Carlos Sanz	
J U N E	11	Jurassic Park	Universal Pictures / Amblin Entertainment	Steven Spielberg (director); Michael Crichton (screenplay); Sam Neill, Laura Dern, Jeff Goldblum, Richard Attenborough, Bob Peck, Martin Ferrero, BD Wong, Samuel L. Jackson, Wayne Knight, Joseph Mazzello, Ariana Richards, Miguel Sandoval, Jerry Molen, Cameron Thor, Christopher John Fields, Whitby Hertford, Dean Cundey, Greg Burson, Richard Kiley, Michael Lantieri	
J U N E	18	Last Action Hero	Columbia Pictures	John McTiernan (director); Shane Black, David Arnott (screenplay); Arnold Schwarzenegger, F. Murray Abraham, Charles Dance, Tom Noonan, Austin O'Brien, Art Carney, Robert Prosky, Anthony Quinn, Mercedes Ruehl, Bridgette Wilson, Frank McRae, Professor Toru Tanaka, Ryan Todd, Bobbie Brown, Tina Turner, Sharon Stone, Robert Patrick, Mike Muscat, Angie Everhart, Maria Shriver, Little Richard, Leeza Gibbons, James Belushi, Damon Wayans, Chevy Chase, Jean-Claude Van Damme, MC Hammer, Wilson Phillips, Ian McKellen, Danny DeVito, Joan Plowright, Colleen Camp, Chris Connelly, Karen Duffy, Larry Ferguson, Keith Barish, Melvin Van Peebles, Noah Emmerich, John Finnegan, Sven-Ole Thorsen, Rick Ducommun, Michael V. Gazzo, Lee Reherman, Henry Kingi, Dagmar Koller, Don LaFontaine, Al Leong, Thomas Rosales Jr., Basil Sydney, Persia White	
J U N E	18	Once Upon a Forest	20th Century Fox	Charles Grosvenor (director); Mark Young, Kelly Ward (screenplay); Michael Crawford, Ellen Blain, Benji Gregory, Paige Gosney, Elisabeth Moss, Ben Vereen, Will Estes, Charlie Adler, Rickey D'Shon Collins, Don Reed, Robert David Hall, Paul Eiding, Janet Waldo, Susan Silo, Florence Warner, Angel Harper, Benjamin Kimball Smith, Haven Hartman	
J U N E	25	Dennis the Menace	Warner Bros. Pictures / Hughes Entertainment	Nick Castle (director); John Hughes (screenplay); Walter Matthau, Mason Gamble, Joan Plowright, Christopher Lloyd, Lea Thompson, Paul Winfield, Robert Stanton, Ben Stein, Natasha Lyonne, Devin Ratray, Amy Sakasitz, Kellen Hathaway, Hank Johnston, Melinda Mullins, Billie Bird, Bill Irwin, Arnold Stang, Jeannie Russell	
J U N E	25	House of Cards	Miramax Films	Michael Lessac (director/screenplay); Kathleen Turner, Tommy Lee Jones, Asha Menina, Shiloh Strong, Esther Rolle, Park Overall, Michael Horse, Anne Pitoniak, Joaquin Martinez, Jacqueline Cassell, Nick Searcy	
J U N E	25	Sleepless in Seattle	TriStar Pictures	Nora Ephron (director/screenplay); David S. Ward, Jeff Arch (screenplay); Tom Hanks, Meg Ryan, Bill Pullman, Ross Malinger, Rosie O'Donnell, Rob Reiner, Rita Wilson, Gaby Hoffmann, Victor Garber, Barbara Garrick, Carey Lowell, David Hyde Pierce, Dana Ivey, Kevin O'Morrison, Caroline Aaron, Frances Conroy, Calvin Trillin, Linda Wallem, LaTanya Richardson Jackson, Tom McGowan, Brian McConnachie, Michael Badalucco	
J U N E	25	What's Love Got to Do with It	Touchstone Pictures	Brian Gibson (director); Kate Lanier (screenplay); Angela Bassett, Laurence Fishburne, Khandi Alexander, Jenifer Lewis, Phyllis Yvonne Stickney, Penny Johnson Jerald, Vanessa Bell Calloway, Chi McBride, James Reyne, Richard T. Jones, Shavar Ross, Rae'Ven Larrymore Kelly, Sherman Augustus, Terrence Riggins, Rob LaBelle, Damon Hines, Suli McCullough, Elijah B. Saleem, Cora Lee Day	
J U N E	26	Extreme Justice	Trimark Pictures / HBO	Mark L. Lester (director); Frank Sacks, Robert Boris (screenplay); Lou Diamond Phillips, Scott Glenn, Chelsea Field, Yaphet Kotto, Andrew Divoff, Richard Grove, William Lucking, L. Scott Caldwell, Daniel Quinn, Thomas Rosales Jr., Jay Arlen Jones, Adam Gifford, Jophery C. Brown, Stephen Root, Ed Lauter, Larry Holt, Ed Frias, Sonia Lopes	

== July–September ==
Opening		Title	Production company	Cast and crew	Ref.
J U L Y	2	The Firm	Paramount Pictures	Sydney Pollack (director); David Rabe, Robert Towne, David Rayfiel (screenplay); Tom Cruise, Jeanne Tripplehorn, Gene Hackman, Ed Harris, Holly Hunter, Hal Holbrook, David Strathairn, Terry Kinney, Wilford Brimley, Gary Busey, Steven Hill, Tobin Bell, Barbara Garrick, Jerry Hardin, Paul Calderon, Jerry Weintraub, Sullivan Walker, Karina Lombard, Margo Martindale, John Beal, Dean Norris, Afemo Omilami	
J U L Y	2	Snow White and the Seven Dwarfs (re-release)	Walt Disney Pictures	David Hand, William Cottrell, Wilfred Jackson, Larry Morey, Perce Pearce, Ben Sharpsteen (directors); Ted Sears, Richard Creedon, Otto Englander, Dick Rickard, Earl Hurd, Merrill De Maris, Dorothy Ann Blank, Webb Smith (screenplay); Adriana Caselotti, Lucille La Verne, Harry Stockwell, Roy Atwell, Pinto Colvig, Otis Harlan, Scotty Mattraw, Billy Gilbert, Eddie Collins, Moroni Olsen, Stuart Buchanan	
J U L Y	2	Son in Law	Hollywood Pictures	Steve Rash (director); Patrick Clifton, Susan McMartin, Peter M. Lenkov, Fax Bahr, Adam Small, Shawn Schepps (screenplay); Pauly Shore, Carla Gugino, Lane Smith, Cindy Pickett, Mason Adams, Patrick Renna, Dennis Burkley, Tiffani Amber-Thiessen, Dan Gauthier, Graham Jarvis, Adam Goldberg, Garret Sato, Emily Dole, Jeanne Basone, Flea, Brendan Fraser	
J U L Y	9	In the Line of Fire	Columbia Pictures / Castle Rock Entertainment	Wolfgang Petersen (director); Jeff Maguire (screenplay); Clint Eastwood, John Malkovich, Rene Russo, Dylan McDermott, Gary Cole, Fred Dalton Thompson, John Mahoney, Gregory Alan Williams, Tobin Bell, William G. Schilling, Cylk Cozart, Clyde Kusatsu, Steve Hytner, Patrika Darbo, John Heard, Joshua Malina, Walt MacPherson, Elsa Raven, Ryan Cutrona, Eric Bruskotter, Carl Ciarfalio, Robert Peters, Anthony Peck, Rick Hurst, Steve Railsback	
J U L Y	9	Rookie of the Year	20th Century Fox	Daniel Stern (director); Sam Harper (screenplay); Thomas Ian Nicholas, Gary Busey, Dan Hedaya, Daniel Stern, Albert Hall, Amy Morton, Bruce Altman, Eddie Bracken, Robert Hy Gorman, Patrick Labrecque, Tom Milanovich, Neil Flynn, W. Earl Brown, Ian Gomez, Andy Berman, Colombe Jacobsen, John Candy, Barry Bonds, Bobby Bonilla, Pedro Guerrero	
J U L Y	9	Weekend at Bernie's II	TriStar Pictures	Robert Klane (director/screenplay); Andrew McCarthy, Jonathan Silverman, Terry Kiser, Barry Bostwick, Troy Beyer, Tom Wright, Steve James, Novella Nelson, Gary Dourdan, Stack Pierce, Constance Shulman	
J U L Y	16	Benefit of the Doubt	Miramax Films	Jonathan Heap (director); Jeffrey Polman, Christopher Keyser (screenplay); Donald Sutherland, Amy Irving, Rider Strong, Christopher McDonald, Graham Greene, Theodore Bikel, Gisela Kovach, Ferdy Mayne, Julie Hasel, Patricia Tallman, Ralph McTurk, Shane McCabe, Margaret Johnson, Heinrich James	
J U L Y	16	Free Willy	Warner Bros. Pictures	Simon Wincer (director); Keith A. Walker, Corey Blechman (screenplay); Jason James Richter, Lori Petty, Jayne Atkinson, August Schellenberg, Michael Madsen, Michael Ironside, Mykelti Williamson, Danielle Harris, Richard Riehle, Michael Bacall	
J U L Y	16	Hocus Pocus	Walt Disney Pictures	Kenny Ortega (director); Mick Garris, Neil Cuthbert (screenplay); Bette Midler, Sarah Jessica Parker, Kathy Najimy, Omri Katz, Thora Birch, Vinessa Shaw, Sean Murray, Jason Marsden, Doug Jones, Charles Rocket, Stephanie Faracy, Amanda Shepherd, Larry Bagby, Tobias Jelinek, Steve Voboril, Norbert Weisser, Kathleen Freeman	
J U L Y	23	Another Stakeout	Touchstone Pictures	John Badham (director); Jim Kouf (screenplay); Richard Dreyfuss, Emilio Estevez, Rosie O'Donnell, Dennis Farina, Marcia Strassman, Cathy Moriarty, John Rubinstein, Miguel Ferrer, Sharon Maughan, Christopher Doyle, Sharon Schaffer, Frank C. Turner, Dan Lauria, Larry B. Scott, Sammy Jackson, Blu Mankuma, Michael DeLano, Steve Bacic, John Badham, Madeleine Stowe	
J U L Y	23	Coneheads	Paramount Pictures	Steve Barron (director); Tom Davis, Dan Aykroyd, Bonnie Turner, Terry Turner (screenplay); Dan Aykroyd, Jane Curtin, Michael McKean, Laraine Newman, Jason Alexander, Lisa Jane Persky, Chris Farley, David Spade, Sinbad, Phil Hartman, Jan Hooks, Dave Thomas, Michelle Burke, Michael Richards, Eddie Griffin, Adam Sandler, Garrett Morris, Drew Carey, Kevin Nealon, Jon Lovitz, Tom Arnold, Parker Posey, Joey Lauren Adams, Julia Sweeney, Ellen DeGeneres, Tim Meadows, Peter Aykroyd, Tom Davis, Jonathan Penner, Whip Hubley, Todd Susman, James Keane, Sam Freed, Leonard Nimoy, William Shatner	
J U L Y	23	Poetic Justice	Columbia Pictures	John Singleton (director/screenplay); Janet Jackson, Tupac Shakur, Regina King, Joe Torry, Roger Guenveur Smith, Tyra Ferrell, Maya Angelou, Rose Weaver, Billy Zane, Lori Petty, Khandi Alexander, Jenifer Lewis, Maia Campbell, Norma Donaldson, Dedrick D. Gobert, René Elizondo Jr., Clifton Gonzalez-Gonzalez, Ricky Harris, Tone Loc, Q-Tip, Keith Washington, Yvette Wilson, Michael Rapaport, Michael Colyar, Robi Reed, Kimberly Brooks, Miki Howard, Umar Bin Hassan, Lloyd Avery II, Rico E. Anderson, Geoff Callan	
J U L Y	28	Robin Hood: Men in Tights	20th Century Fox	Mel Brooks (director/screenplay); J. David Shapiro, Evan Chandler (screenplay); Cary Elwes, Richard Lewis, Roger Rees, Amy Yasbeck, Mark Blankfield, Dave Chappelle, Isaac Hayes, Megan Cavanagh, Eric Allan Kramer, Matthew Porretta, Tracey Ullman, Patrick Stewart, Dom DeLuise, Dick Van Patten, Robert Ridgely, Mel Brooks, Avery Schreiber, Chuck McCann, Brian George, Clive Revill, Carol Arthur, Clement von Franckenstein, Corbin Allred, Chase Masterson, Malcolm Danare, Nick Jameson, Rudy De Luca, Laurie Main, David DeLuise	
J U L Y	30	Rising Sun	20th Century Fox	Philip Kaufman (director/screenplay); Michael Crichton, Michael Backes (screenplay); Sean Connery, Wesley Snipes, Harvey Keitel, Cary-Hiroyuki Tagawa, Kevin Anderson, Mako, Ray Wise, Stan Shaw, Tia Carrere, Steve Buscemi, Tatjana Patitz, Peter Crombie, Sam Lloyd, Alexandra Powers, Daniel von Bargen, Amy Hill, Clyde Kusatsu, Michael Chapman, Joey Miyashima, Tamara Tunie, Tony Ganios, Michael Kinsley, Eleanor Clift, Clarence Page, Pat Choate, Steven Clemons, Dan Butler, Tylyn John, Shelley Michelle, Michele Ruiz, Jeff Imada, Meagen Fay, Max Grodénchik, Gunnar Peterson, Jessica Tuck, Tak Kubota, Fumio Demura, Tadashi Yamashita, Leo Lee, Dakin Matthews, Stan Egi, Lauren Robinson, Tom Dahlgren, Nelson Mashita, James Oliver Bullock, Toshishiro Obata	
J U L Y	30	So I Married an Axe Murderer	TriStar Pictures	Thomas Schlamme (director); Robbie Fox (screenplay); Mike Myers, Nancy Travis, Anthony LaPaglia, Amanda Plummer, Michael Richards, Brenda Fricker, Matt Doherty, Charles Grodin, Phil Hartman, Debi Mazar, Steven Wright, Jessie Nelson, Alan Arkin, Greg Germann, Kelvin Han Yee, Patrick Bristow, Luenell Campbell, Steve Dunleavy, Michael G. Hagerty, Glen Vernon, Robert Nichols, Rico E. Anderson, Sheila Kelley, Holly Lewis, Marla Sokoloff, Carrot Top	
J U L Y	30	Tom and Jerry: The Movie	Miramax Films / Live Entertainment	Phil Roman (director); Dennis Marks (screenplay); Richard Kind, Dana Hill, Anndi McAfee, Charlotte Rae, Tony Jay, Michael Bell, Henry Gibson, Ed Gilbert, David L. Lander, Rip Taylor, Howard Morris, Sydney Lassick, Don Messick, Tino Insana, B.J. Ward, Greg Burson	
A U G U S T	6	The Fugitive	Warner Bros. Pictures	Andrew Davis (director); Jeb Stuart, David Twohy (screenplay); Harrison Ford, Tommy Lee Jones, Sela Ward, Julianne Moore, Joe Pantoliano, Andreas Katsulas, Jeroen Krabbe, Daniel Roebuck, Tom Wood, L. Scott Caldwell, Ron Dean, Dick Cusack, Andy Romano, Richard Riehle, Frank Ray Perilli, Danny Goldring, Nick Searcy, Johnny Lee Davenport, Jane Lynch, Pam Zekman, David Pasquesi, Kirsten Nelson, Neil Flynn, Lester Holt, Joseph F. Kosala, David Darlow, Eddie Bo Smith, Jay Levine	
A U G U S T	6	The Meteor Man	Metro-Goldwyn-Mayer	Robert Townsend (director/screenplay); Robert Townsend, Marla Gibbs, Eddie Griffin, Robert Guillaume, James Earl Jones, Bill Cosby, Another Bad Creation, Luther Vandross, Sinbad, Naughty by Nature, Cypress Hill, Big Daddy Kane, Frank Gorshin, Roy Fegan, Don Cheadle, Nancy Wilson, Tommy "Tiny" Lister Jr., Wallace Shawn, Faizon Love, Biz Markie, John Witherspoon, Jenifer Lewis, Lela Rochon, Charlayne Woodard, Stephanie E. Williams, Beverly Johnson, LaWanda Page, Barbara Montgomery, Deborah Lacey, Stu Gilliam, Angela Robinson, Don Reed, Jeff Coopwood, Lester Speight, Chris Tucker	
A U G U S T	6	My Boyfriend's Back	Touchstone Pictures	Bob Balaban (director); Dean Lorey (screenplay); Andrew Lowery, Traci Lind, Danny Zorn, Edward Herrmann, Mary Beth Hurt, Jay O. Sanders, Libby Villari, Matthew Fox, Philip Hoffman, Paul Dooley, Austin Pendleton, Cloris Leachman, Paxton Whitehead, Matthew McConaughey	
A U G U S T	6	That Night	Warner Bros. Pictures	Craig Bolotin (director/screenplay); C. Thomas Howell, Juliette Lewis, Eliza Dushku, Helen Shaver, John Dossett, J. Smith-Cameron, Katherine Heigl	
A U G U S T	6	The Wedding Banquet	The Samuel Goldwyn Company	Ang Lee (director/screenplay); Neil Peng, James Schamus (screenplay); Winston Chao, May Chin, Gua Ah-leh, Sihung Lung, Mitchell Lichtenstein	
A U G U S T	11	Searching for Bobby Fischer	Paramount Pictures	Steven Zaillian (director/screenplay); Joe Mantegna, Laurence Fishburne, Joan Allen, Max Pomeranc, Ben Kingsley, Robert Stephens, David Paymer, Hal Scardino, William H. Macy, Dan Hedaya, Laura Linney, Anthony Heald, Josh Mostel, Tony Shalhoub, Austin Pendleton, Tom McGowan, Anjelina Belakovskaia, Joel Benjamin, Roman Dzindzichashvili, Kamran Shirazi, Joshua Waitzkin, Bruce Pandolfini, R.D. Reid, Bobby Fischer, Michael Nirenberg, Vasek Simek, Vincent Livermore, Russell Garber	
A U G U S T	13	Heart and Souls	Universal Pictures	Ron Underwood (director); Brent Maddock, S. S. Wilson, Gregory Hansen, Erik Hansen (screenplay); Robert Downey Jr., Charles Grodin, Kyra Sedgwick, Elisabeth Shue, Tom Sizemore, David Paymer, Alfre Woodard, Lisa Lucas, Janet MacLachlan, Sean O'Bryan, Marc Shaiman, Richard Portnow, Eric Lloyd, Bill Capizzi, Susan Kellermann, Richard Roat, Lorinne Vozoff, Luana Anders, John Durbin, B.B. King, Tony Genaro, Kurtwood Smith, Chloe Webb, Bill Calvert, Eric Poppick, Wren T. Brown, Keaton Tyndall, Kylie Tyndall	
A U G U S T	13	Jason Goes to Hell: The Final Friday	New Line Cinema	Adam Marcus (director); Jay Huguely, Adam Marcus, Dean Lorey (screenplay); John D. LeMay, Kari Keegan, Steven Williams, Kane Hodder, Allison Smith, Erin Gray, Steven Culp, Rusty Schwimmer, Leslie Jordan, Billy "Green" Bush, Andrew Bloch, Kipp Marcus, Richard Gant, Dean Lorey, Michelle Clunie, Michael B. Silver, Jonathan Penner	
A U G U S T	13	The Secret Garden	Warner Bros. Pictures	Agnieszka Holland (director); Caroline Thompson (screenplay); Kate Maberly, Heydon Prowse, Andrew Knott, Maggie Smith, John Lynch, Irene Jacob, Colin Bruce, Laura Crossley, Walter Sparrow	
A U G U S T	18	Manhattan Murder Mystery	TriStar Pictures	Woody Allen (director/screenplay); Marshall Brickman (screenplay); Woody Allen, Diane Keaton, Alan Alda, Anjelica Huston, Jerry Adler, Lynn Cohen, Melanie Norris, Marge Redmond, Joy Behar, Ron Rifkin, Zach Braff, John Doumanian, Sylvia Kauders, Aida Turturro, John Costelloe, Frank Pellegrino, Wendell Pierce, Vincent Pastore	
A U G U S T	20	The Ballad of Little Jo	Fine Line Features	Maggie Greenwald (director/screenplay); Suzy Amis, Bo Hopkins, Ian McKellen, David Chung, Heather Graham, Rene Auberjonois, Carrie Snodgress, Anthony Heald, Melissa Leo, Sam Robards	
A U G U S T	20	Hard Target	Universal Pictures	John Woo (director); Chuck Pfarrer (screenplay); Jean-Claude Van Damme, Lance Henriksen, Yancy Butler, Arnold Vosloo, Wilford Brimley, Kasi Lemmons, Chuck Pfarrer, Willie C. Carpenter, Sven-Ole Thorsen, Jules Sylvester, Marco St. John, Joe Warfield	
A U G U S T	20	King of the Hill	Gramercy Pictures	Steven Soderbergh (director/screenplay); Jesse Bradford, Jeroen Krabbe, Lisa Eichhorn, Karen Allen, Spalding Gray, Elizabeth McGovern, Cameron Boyd, Adrien Brody, John McConnell, Amber Benson, Kristin Griffith, Katherine Heigl	
A U G U S T	20	Surf Ninjas	New Line Cinema	Neal Israel (director/screenplay); Dan Gordon (screenplay); Ernie Reyes Jr., Rob Schneider, Tone Loc, Leslie Nielsen, John Karlen, Ernie Reyes Sr., Nicolas Cowan, Kelly Hu, Nathan Jung	
A U G U S T	20	Wilder Napalm	TriStar Pictures	Glenn Gordon Caron (director); Vince Gilligan (screenplay); Dennis Quaid, Debra Winger, Arliss Howard, M. Emmet Walsh, Jim Varney, Charles Gideon Davis, John Hostetter, Jonathan Rubin, Harvey Shield, Allyce Beasley, Lance Lee Baxley	
A U G U S T	21	Strapped	HBO Showcase / Osiris Films	Forest Whitaker (director); Dena Kleiman (screenplay); Starletta DuPois, Tonya Pinkins, Jamie Tirelli, Willie James Stiggers, Jr., Monie Love, Tanganyika, Dorothi Fox, Chi Ali, Bokeem Woodbine, Kia Joy Goodwin, Marcella Lowery, Joseph Gimpel, Jermaine 'Huggy' Hopkins, Nzingha, Fredro Starr, Michael Biehn, Wendell Pierce, Yul Vazquez, Samuel E. Wright, Isaiah Washington, Paul McCrane, Craig Wasson, George Letrell Dynamite, Yolanda 'Yo-Yo' Whittaker, Kool Moe Dee, Jack O'Connell, Dina Meyer, Carmel Forte, Andre G. 'Crazy Drayz' Weston, Skoob, Angela Jones, Busta Rhymes, Sticky Fingaz	
A U G U S T	25	The Man Without a Face	Warner Bros. Pictures / Icon Productions	Mel Gibson (director); Isabelle Holland (screenplay); Mel Gibson, Nick Stahl, Margaret Whitton, Fay Masterson, Gaby Hoffmann, Geoffrey Lewis, Richard Masur, Michael DeLuise, Ethan Phillips, Jack De Mave, Viva, George Martin, Michael Currie, Zach Grenier	
A U G U S T	27	Father Hood	Hollywood Pictures	Darrell Roodt (director); Scott Spencer (screenplay); Patrick Swayze, Halle Berry, Sabrina Lloyd, Brian Bonsall, Michael Ironside, Diane Ladd, Bob Gunton, Adrienne Barbeau, Martha Veléz	
A U G U S T	27	Needful Things	Columbia Pictures / Castle Rock Entertainment	Fraser Clarke Heston (director); W. D. Richter (screenplay); Max von Sydow, Ed Harris, Bonnie Bedelia, Amanda Plummer, J.T. Walsh, Ray McKinnon, Valri Bromfield, Duncan Fraser, Shane Meier, W. Morgan Sheppard, Don S. Davis, Gillian Barber, Lochlyn Munro, Campbell Lane, Frank C. Turner	
A U G U S T	27	Only the Strong	20th Century Fox	Sheldon Lettich (director); Sheldon Lettich, Luis Esteban (screenplay); Mark Dacascos, Stacey Travis, Geoffrey Lewis, Paco Christian Prieto, Todd Susman, Jeffrey Anderson-Gunter, Richard Coca	
A U G U S T	27	Son of the Pink Panther	Metro-Goldwyn-Mayer	Blake Edwards (director/screenplay); Madeline Sunshine, Steve Sunshine (screenplay); Roberto Benigni, Herbert Lom, Claudia Cardinale, Debrah Farentino, Jennifer Edwards, Robert Davi, Mark Schneider, Burt Kwouk, Mike Starr, Kenny Spalding, Anton Rodgers, Graham Stark, Oliver Cotton, Shabana Azmi, Aharon Ipale, Dermot Crowley, Liz Smith	
A U G U S T	27	The Thing Called Love	Paramount Pictures	Peter Bogdanovich (director); Carol Heikkinen (screenplay); River Phoenix, Samantha Mathis, Dermot Mulroney, Sandra Bullock, K.T. Oslin, Anthony Clark, Webb Wilder, Deborah Allen, Jo-El Sonnier, Pam Tillis, Vern Monnett, Kevin Welch, Trisha Yearwood, Jimmie Dale Gilmore	
S E P T E M B E R	3	Calendar Girl	Columbia Pictures	John Whitesell (director); Paul W. Shapiro (screenplay); Jason Priestley, Gabriel Olds, Jerry O'Connell, Joe Pantoliano, Steve Railsback, Kurt Fuller, Stephen Tobolowsky, Emily Warfield, Leslie Wing, Blake McIver Ewing, Liz Vassey, Lisa Stahl Sullivan, Maxwell Caulfield, Rae Allen, Tuesday Knight, Phil Reeves, Steve Carlisle, Chubby Checker, Joe Dietl, Christine Taylor, Stephanie Anderson, Cortney Page, Curt Truman	
S E P T E M B E R	3	Fortress	Dimension Films / Columbia Pictures / Davis Entertainment	Stuart Gordon (director); Troy Neighbors, Steven Feinberg (screenplay); Christopher Lambert, Kurtwood Smith, Loryn Locklin, Jeffrey Combs, Vernon Wells, Clifton Collins, Jr.	
S E P T E M B E R	3	Kalifornia	Gramercy Pictures / Propaganda Films	Dominic Sena (director); Stephen Levy, Tim Metcalfe (screenplay); Brad Pitt, Juliette Lewis, David Duchovny, Michelle Forbes	
S E P T E M B E R	8	The Joy Luck Club	Hollywood Pictures	Wayne Wang (director); Amy Tan, Ronald Bass (screenplay); Ming-Na Wen, Tamlyn Tomita, Lauren Tom, Rosalind Chao, Kieu Chinh, Tsai Chin, France Nuyen, Lisa Lu, Victor Wong, Xi Meijuan, Christopher Rich, Russell Wong, Michael Paul Chan, Vivian Wu, Andrew McCarthy, Diane Baker, Wu Tianming, Elizabeth Sung, Chao-Li Chi	
S E P T E M B E R	10	Money for Nothing	Hollywood Pictures	Ramón Menéndez (director/screenplay); Tom Musca, Carol Sobieski (screenplay); John Cusack, Michael Madsen, Debi Mazar, Benicio del Toro, Maury Chaykin, Michael Rapaport, James Gandolfini, Philip Seymour Hoffman, Fionnula Flanagan, Frankie Faison, Elizabeth Bracco, Currie Graham, Lenny Venito, Bingo O'Malley, Alice Drummond, Joseph R. Gannascoli, Joey Coyle	
S E P T E M B E R	10	The Real McCoy	Universal Pictures	Russell Mulcahy (director); William Davies, William Osborne (screenplay); Kim Basinger, Val Kilmer, Terence Stamp, Gailard Sartain, Raynor Scheine, Andy Stahl, Marc Macaulay, Nick Searcy, Afemo Omilami, Zach English, Deborah Hobart, Pamela Stubbart, Dean Rader-Duval, Norman Maxwell	
S E P T E M B E R	10	True Romance	Warner Bros. Pictures / Morgan Creek Productions	Tony Scott (director); Quentin Tarantino (screenplay); Christian Slater, Patricia Arquette, Dennis Hopper, Val Kilmer, Gary Oldman, Brad Pitt, Christopher Walken, Bronson Pinchot, Samuel L. Jackson, Michael Rapaport, Saul Rubinek, Conchata Ferrell, James Gandolfini, Anna Thomson, Victor Argo, Chris Penn, Tom Sizemore, Said Faraj, Gregory Sporleder, Maria Pitillo, Frank Adonis, Kevin Corrigan, Paul Ben-Victor, Michael Beach, Eric Allan Kramer, Laurence Mason, Ed Lauter, Paul Bates, Joe D'Angerio, Patrick John Hurley, Enzo Rossi	
S E P T E M B E R	10	Undercover Blues	Metro-Goldwyn-Mayer	Herbert Ross (director); Ian Abrams (screenplay); Kathleen Turner, Dennis Quaid, Fiona Shaw, Stanley Tucci, Larry Miller, Obba Babatundé, Tom Arnold, Park Overall, Ralph Brown, Jan Triska, Marshall Bell, Richard Jenkins, Dennis Lipscomb, Saul Rubinek, Dave Chappelle, Dakin Matthews, Michael Greene, Olek Krupa, Jenifer Lewis, Chris Ellis, Michael Arata, James Lew, Anne Lockhart	
S E P T E M B E R	11	And the Band Played On	HBO Pictures	Roger Spottiswoode (director); Arnold Schulman (screenplay); Matthew Modine, Alan Alda, Patrick Bauchau, Nathalie Baye, Christian Clemenson, David Clennon, Phil Collins, Bud Cort, Alex Courtney, David Dukes, Richard Gere, David Marshall Grant, Ronald Guttman, Glenne Headly, Anjelica Huston, Ken Jenkins, Richard Jenkins, Tchéky Karyo, Swoosie Kurtz, Jack Laufer, Donal Logue, Steve Martin, Richard Masur, Dakin Matthews, Ian McKellen, Peter McRobbie, Lawrence Monoson, Jeffrey Nordling, Saul Rubinek, Charles Martin Smith, Stephen Spinella, Lily Tomlin, B.D. Wong, David Dean Bottrell, Reg E. Cathey, John Durbin, Richard Fancy, Keythe Farley, Christopher John Fields, Patrick Gorman, James Greene, Jeff Hayenga, Laura Innes, Jack Kenny, Thomas Kopache, Clyde Kusatsu, Anthony Lucero, Rosemary Murphy, Angela Paton, Miguel Perez, Tom Schanley, Sean Whitesell, Michael Winters, William Wintersole, Lenny Wolpe, Geoffrey Lower, Richard Marcus, Bobbi Campbell, Ryan White, Rock Hudson, Anthony Perkins, Tina Chow, Rudolf Nureyev, Arthur Ashe, Michael Bennett, Liberace, Freddie Mercury, Elizabeth Glaser, Michael Jackson, Magic Johnson, Elizabeth Taylor, Ronald Reagan, Princess Diana, Larry Kramer, Alison Gertz, Max Robinson, Halston, Willi Smith, Perry Ellis, Peter Allen, Steve Rubell, Keith Haring, Stewart McKinney, Denholm Elliott, Brad Davis, Amanda Blake, Robert Reed, Michel Foucault, Tom Waddell, Roger Mudd	
S E P T E M B E R	15	Household Saints	New Line Cinema	Nancy Savoca (director/screenplay); Richard Guay (screenplay); Tracey Ullman, Vincent D'Onofrio, Lili Taylor, Michael Imperioli, Judith Malina	
S E P T E M B E R	17	The Age of Innocence	Columbia Pictures	Martin Scorsese (director/screenplay); Jay Cocks (screenplay); Daniel Day-Lewis, Michelle Pfeiffer, Winona Ryder, Miriam Margolyes, Geraldine Chaplin, Michael Gough, Richard E. Grant, Mary Beth Hurt, Robert Sean Leonard, Norman Lloyd, Alec McCowen, Sian Phillips, Carolyn Farina, Jonathan Pryce, Alexis Smith, Stuart Wilson, June Squibb, Joanne Woodward, Domenica Cameron-Scorsese	
S E P T E M B E R	17	Airborne	Warner Bros. Pictures / Icon Productions	Rob Bowman (director); Bill Apablasa (screenplay); Shane McDermott, Seth Green, Brittney Powell, Chris Conrad, Edie McClurg, Patrick O'Brien, Jack Black, Alanna Ubach, Jacob Vargas, Chris Edwards	
S E P T E M B E R	17	Into the West	Miramax Films	Mike Newell (director); Jim Sheridan, David Keating (screenplay); Gabriel Byrne, Ellen Barkin, Rúaidhrí Conroy, Ciarán Fitzgerald, David Kelly, Colm Meaney, John Kavanagh, Brendan Gleeson, Jim Norton, Anita Reeves	
S E P T E M B E R	17	Striking Distance	Columbia Pictures	Rowdy Herrington (director/screenplay); Marty Kaplan (screenplay); Bruce Willis, Sarah Jessica Parker, Dennis Farina, Tom Sizemore, Brion James, Robert Pastorelli, Timothy Busfield, John Mahoney, Andre Braugher, Tom Atkins, Mike Hodge, Jodi Long, Roscoe Orman, Gareth Williams, Lawrence Mandley, Julianna McCarthy, Scott Klace, Erik Jensen, Billy Hartung	
S E P T E M B E R	24	Bopha!	Paramount Pictures	Morgan Freeman (director); Brian Bird, John Wierick (screenplay); Danny Glover, Malcolm McDowell, Alfre Woodard, Marius Weyers	
S E P T E M B E R	24	Dazed and Confused	Gramercy Pictures	Richard Linklater (director/screenplay); Jason London, Rory Cochrane, Wiley Wiggins, Adam Goldberg, Matthew McConaughey, Parker Posey, Milla Jovovich, Ben Affleck, Sasha Jenson, Michelle Burke, Christine Harnos, Anthony Rapp, Marissa Ribisi, Shawn Andrews, Cole Hauser, Joey Lauren Adams, Christin Hinojosa, Nicky Katt, Esteban Powell, Renee Zellweger	
S E P T E M B E R	24	The Good Son	20th Century Fox	Joseph Ruben (director); Ian McEwan (screenplay); Macaulay Culkin, Elijah Wood, Wendy Crewson, David Morse, Daniel Hugh Kelly, Jacqueline Brookes, Quinn Culkin, Ashley Crow, Rory Culkin, Pui Fan Lee, Dale Resteghini	
S E P T E M B E R	24	The Program	Touchstone Pictures / The Samuel Goldwyn Company	David S. Ward (director/screenplay); Aaron Latham (screenplay); James Caan, Halle Berry, Omar Epps, Craig Sheffer, Kristy Swanson, Abraham Benrubi, Andrew Bryniarski, Duane Davis, Joey Lauren Adams, Jim Fyfe, Lynn Swann, Bo Schembechler, Chris Berman, J. Don Ferguson, Rhoda Griffis, J. Leon Pridgen II, Jon Pennell	
S E P T E M B E R	24	Warlock: The Armageddon	Trimark Pictures	Anthony Hickox (director); Kevin Rock (screenplay); Julian Sands, Chris Young, Paula Marshall, Joanna Pacula, Steve Kahan, R.G. Armstrong, Charles Hallahan, Bruce Glover, Davis Gaines, Zach Galligan	
S E P T E M B E R	29	A Bronx Tale	Savoy Pictures	Robert De Niro (director); Chazz Palminteri (screenplay); Robert De Niro, Chazz Palminteri, Lillo Brancato, Jr., Francis Capra, Kathrine Narducci, Taral Hicks, Joe Pesci, Louis Vanaria, Domenick Lombardozzi	

== October–December ==
Opening		Title	Production company	Cast and crew	Ref.
O C T O B E R	1	Cool Runnings	Walt Disney Pictures	Jon Turteltaub (director); Lynn Siefert, Tommy Swerdlow, Michael Goldberg (screenplay); Leon, Doug E. Doug, Rawle D. Lewis, Malik Yoba, John Candy, Raymond J. Barry, Peter Outerbridge, Paul Coeur, Larry Gilman, Charles Hyatt, Winston Stona, Bill Dow, Jay Brazeau, Campbell Lane, Matthew Walker, Christopher Gaze, David Lovgren	
O C T O B E R	1	For Love or Money	Universal Pictures / Imagine Entertainment	Barry Sonnenfeld (director); Mark Rosenthal, Lawrence Konner (screenplay); Michael J. Fox, Gabrielle Anwar, Anthony Higgins, Bob Balaban, Michael Tucker, Fyvush Finkel, Dan Hedaya, Isaac Mizrahi, Saverio Guerra, Daniel Hagen, LaChanze, Debra Monk, Harry Bugin, Udo Kier, Patrick Breen, Simon Jones, Dianne Brill, Susan Blommaert, Sandra Reaves-Phillips, Alice Playten, Erick Avari, Douglas Seale, Bobby Short, Cynthia Bailey, Kimora Lee Simmons, Veronica Webb, Hélène Cardona	
O C T O B E R	1	Freaked	20th Century Fox	Alex Winter, Tom Stern (directors/screenplay); Tim Burns (screenplay); Alex Winter, Randy Quaid, William Sadler, Megan Ward, Michael Stoyanov, Bobcat Goldthwait, Mr. T, Brooke Shields, Derek McGrath, Jeff Kahn, John Hawkes, Jon M. Chu, Morgan Fairchild, Lee Arenberg, Ray Baker, Jaime Cardriche, Alex Zuckerman, Michael Gilden, Calvert DeForest, David Bowe, Keanu Reeves, Tim Burns, Patti Tippo, Joseph S. Griffo	
O C T O B E R	1	Malice	Columbia Pictures / Castle Rock Entertainment	Harold Becker (director); Aaron Sorkin, Scott Frank (screenplay); Alec Baldwin, Nicole Kidman, Bill Pullman, Bebe Neuwirth, George C. Scott, Anne Bancroft, Peter Gallagher, Josef Sommer, Tobin Bell, Debrah Farentino, Gwyneth Paltrow, David Bowe, Diana Bellamy, Ken Cheeseman, Joshua Malina, Brenda Strong, Ann Cusack	
O C T O B E R	1	M. Butterfly	Geffen Pictures	David Cronenberg (director); David Henry Hwang (screenplay); Jeremy Irons, John Lone, Ian Richardson, Barbara Sukowa, Annabel Leventon, Shizuko Hoshi, Vernon Dobtcheff	
O C T O B E R	3	Short Cuts	Fine Line Features	Robert Altman (director/screenplay); Frank Barhydt (screenplay); Andie MacDowell, Bruce Davison, Julianne Moore, Matthew Modine, Anne Archer, Fred Ward, Jennifer Jason Leigh, Chris Penn, Lili Taylor, Robert Downey Jr., Madeleine Stowe, Tim Robbins, Lily Tomlin, Tom Waits, Frances McDormand, Peter Gallagher, Annie Ross, Lori Singer, Jack Lemmon, Lyle Lovett, Buck Henry, Huey Lewis, Charles Rocket, Michael Beach, Robert Do'Qui, Darnell Williams, Deborah Falconer, Dirk Blocker, Alex Trebek, Jerry Dunphy	
O C T O B E R	8	Deadfall	Trimark Pictures	Christopher Coppola (director/screenplay); Nick Vallelonga (screenplay); Michael Biehn, Sarah Trigger, Nicolas Cage, James Coburn, Peter Fonda, Charlie Sheen, Talia Shire	
O C T O B E R	8	Demolition Man	Warner Bros. Pictures / Silver Pictures	Marco Brambilla (director); Daniel Waters, Robert Reneau, Peter M. Lenkov (screenplay); Sylvester Stallone, Wesley Snipes, Sandra Bullock, Nigel Hawthorne, Benjamin Bratt, Bob Gunton, Glenn Shadix, Denis Leary, Grand L. Bush, Pat Skipper, Steve Kahan, Mark Colson, Andre Gregory, John Enos, Troy Evans, Bill Cobbs, Paul Perri, Chris Durand, Dan Cortese, Lara Harris, Brandy Sanders, Jack Black, Jesse Ventura, David Patrick Kelly, Adrienne Barbeau, Vanna Bonta, Jennifer Darling, Rob Schneider, Trent Walker, Carlton Wilborn, Charles Glass, Ben Jurand, Billy D. Lucas, Rhino Michaels, Toshishiro Obata	
O C T O B E R	8	Gettysburg	New Line Cinema	Ronald F. Maxwell (director/screenplay); Tom Berenger, Jeff Daniels, Martin Sheen, Sam Elliott, Stephen Lang, Maxwell Caulfield, Kevin Conway, C. Thomas Howell, Richard Jordan, Richard Anderson, Royce D. Applegate, John Diehl, Joshua D. Maurer, Patrick Gorman, Cooper Huckabee, Brian Mallon, Andrew Prine, John Rothman, Tim Scott, W. Morgan Sheppard, Joseph Fuqua, Kieran Mulroney, James Patrick Stuart, Warren Burton, Donal Logue, Herb Mitchell, Dwier Brown, George Lazenby	
O C T O B E R	8	Mr. Jones	TriStar Pictures / Rastar Productions	Mike Figgis (director); Eric Roth, Michael Cristofer (screenplay); Richard Gere, Lena Olin, Anne Bancroft, Tom Irwin, Delroy Lindo, Lauren Tom, Bruce Altman, Lisa Malkiewicz, Albert Henderson, Thomas Kopache, Peter Jurasik, Anna Maria Horsford, Kelli Williams, Scott Thomson, Bill Moseley, Thomas Mikal Ford, Lela Ivey, Valente Rodriguez, Irene Tsu, Kathy Kinney, Annie McEnroe, John Durbin, Lucinda Jenney, Taylor Negron, Sheryl Lee, Bill Pullman, Sal Lopez, David Brisbin, Dana Lee	
O C T O B E R	8	Mr. Nanny	New Line Cinema	Michael Gottlieb (director/screenplay); Edward Rugoff (screenplay); Hulk Hogan, Sherman Hemsley, Austin Pendleton, Madeline Zima, Robert Hy Gorman, Raymond O'Connor, Afa Anoa'i, Brutus Beefcake, George "The Animal" Steele, Mother Love, David Johansen	
O C T O B E R	15	The Beverly Hillbillies	20th Century Fox	Penelope Spheeris (director); Lawrence Konner, Mark Rosenthal (story and screenplay), Jim Fisher, Jim Staahl (screenplay); Jim Varney, Diedrich Bader, Erika Eleniak, Cloris Leachman, Dabney Coleman, Lily Tomlin, Lea Thompson, Rob Schneider, Penny Fuller, Kevin Connolly, Linda Carlson, Buddy Ebsen, Leann Hunley, Robert Easton, Dolly Parton, Zsa Zsa Gabor, Lyman Ward, Ernie Lively, Patrick Crenshaw, Eric 'Sparky' Edwards, Mickey Jones, Carmen Filpi, Beverly Polcyn	
O C T O B E R	15	Fearless	Warner Bros. Pictures	Peter Weir (director); Rafael Yglesias (screenplay); Jeff Bridges, Isabella Rossellini, Rosie Perez, Tom Hulce, John Turturro, Benicio del Toro, Deirdre O'Connell, John de Lancie, Debra Monk, William Newman	
O C T O B E R	15	Judgment Night	Universal Pictures / Largo Entertainment	Stephen Hopkins (director); Lewis Colick (screenplay); Emilio Estevez, Cuba Gooding Jr., Denis Leary, Stephen Dorff, Jeremy Piven, Peter Greene, Erik Schrody, Michael Wiseman, Michael DeLorenzo, Christine Harnos	
O C T O B E R	15	Mr. Wonderful	Warner Bros. Pictures	Anthony Minghella (director); Amy Schor, Vicki Polon (screenplay); Matt Dillon, Annabella Sciorra, Mary-Louise Parker, William Hurt, Vincent D'Onofrio, Dan Hedaya, Bruce Kirby, Luis Guzmán, Jessica Harper, Joanna Merlin, Bruce Altman, Peter Appel, Arabella Field, James Gandolfini, Saverio Guerra, Angela Hall, John Christopher Jones, Frank Pellegrino, Adam LeFevre, Renée Lippin, Bruce MacVittie, Harsh Nayyar, John Rothman, Brooke Smith, Mary Louise Wilson, Floyd Vivino, Seth Gilliam, David Barry Gray, Paul Bates, Geoffrey Grider, William Duff-Griffin, Eric Kollegger, James Lorinz	
O C T O B E R	22	Rudy	TriStar Pictures	David Anspaugh (director); Angelo Pizzo (screenplay); Sean Astin, Ned Beatty, Charles S. Dutton, Lili Taylor, Robert Prosky, Jon Favreau, Jason Miller, Mitch Rouse, John Beasley, Vince Vaughn, Robert J. Steinmiller Jr., John Duda, Joseph Sikora, Chelcie Ross, Amy Pietz, Ron Dean, Gerry Becker, Robert Swan, Lorenzo Clemons, Theodore Hesburgh, Daniel "Rudy" Ruettiger, Mo Gallini, Dan Severn, Jimmy Star, Scott Benjaminson, Kevin Duda, Jake Armstrong, Greta Lind, Christopher Reed	
O C T O B E R	22	Twenty Bucks	Triton Pictures	Keva Rosenfeld (director); Leslie Bohem, Endre Bohem (screenplay); Linda Hunt, Brendan Fraser, Elisabeth Shue, Steve Buscemi, Christopher Lloyd, Diane Baker, Shohreh Aghdashloo, Spalding Gray, Sam Jenkins, Melora Walters, Gladys Knight, William H. Macy, David Schwimmer, Jeremy Piven, Edward Blatchford, Ned Bellamy, Matt Frewer, Alan North, Kevin Kilner, David Rasche, George Morfogen, Rosemary Murphy, Concetta Tomei, Peggy Miley, Vanessa Marquez, Valente Rodriguez, Nina Siemaszko, Chloe Webb	
O C T O B E R	29	Ruby Cairo	Miramax Films	Graeme Clifford (director); Robert Dillon, Michael Thomas (screenplay); Andie MacDowell, Liam Neeson, Viggo Mortensen, Jack Thompson, Amy Van Nostrand, Pedro Gonzalez Gonzalez, Paul Spencer, Chad Power	
O C T O B E R	29	Fatal Instinct	Metro-Goldwyn-Mayer	Carl Reiner (director); David O'Malley (screenplay); Armand Assante, Sherilyn Fenn, Kate Nelligan, Sean Young, Christopher McDonald, James Remar, John Witherspoon, Bob Uecker, Eartha Kitt, Tony Randall, Bill Cobbs, Rosie O'Donnell, Clarence Clemons, Michael Cumpsty, Blake Clark, Carl Reiner, Jane Lynch, Jacob Vargas, Ronnie Schell, Suli McCullough, Kevin Michael Richardson, Gregory Sporleder, Savannah Smith Boucher, George Lopez, Doc Severinsen, Christopher Murray, Clement von Franckenstein	
O C T O B E R	29	The Nightmare Before Christmas	Touchstone Pictures	Henry Selick (director); Caroline Thompson, Michael McDowell (screenplay); Danny Elfman, Chris Sarandon, Catherine O'Hara, William Hickey, Glenn Shadix, Ken Page, Paul Reubens, Carmen Twillie, Greg Proops, John Morris, Ed Ivory, Susan McBride, Debi Durst, Kerry Katz, Randy Crenshaw, Sherwood Ball, Glenn Walters	
O C T O B E R	30	The Last Outlaw	HBO Pictures	Geoff Murphy (director); Eric Red (screenplay); Mickey Rourke, Dermot Mulroney, Ted Levine, John C. McGinley, Steve Buscemi, Keith David, Daniel Quinn, Gavan O'Herlihy, Richard Fancy, Paul Ben-Victor	
N O V E M B E R	3	Bitter Harvest	Prism Entertainment	Duane Clark (director); Randall Montana (screenplay); Stephen Baldwin, Patsy Kensit, Jennifer Rubin, Adam Baldwin, M. Emmet Walsh, James Crittenden, Art Evans, Joanna Jackson, Ed Morgan, David Powledge, Jim Lovelett	
N O V E M B E R	5	Flesh and Bone	Paramount Pictures	Steve Kloves (director/screenplay); Dennis Quaid, Meg Ryan, James Caan, Gwyneth Paltrow, Scott Wilson, John Hawkes	
N O V E M B E R	5	A Home of Our Own	PolyGram Filmed Entertainment / Gramercy Pictures	Tony Bill (director); Patrick Sheane Duncan (screenplay); Kathy Bates, Edward Furlong, Clarissa Lassig, Sarah Schaub, Miles Feulner, Amy Sakasitz, T.J. Lowther, Soon-Tek Oh, Tony Campisi	
N O V E M B E R	5	Look Who's Talking Now	TriStar Pictures	Tom Ropelewski (director/screenplay); John Travolta, Kirstie Alley, David Gallagher, Tabitha Lupien, Lysette Anthony, Olympia Dukakis, Danny DeVito, Diane Keaton, George Segal, Charles Barkley, John Stocker, Mark Acheson, Kyle Fairlie, Frank C. Turner, Serge Houde, Roger Cross, Michael Ryan, Robert Wisden, Tegan Moss, Gina Chiarelli, Andrew Airlie, Campbell Lane, Bob Bergen, Peter Iacangelo, Nick Jameson, Patricia Parris, Patrick Pinney, Rodney Saulsberry, Jeff Winkless	
N O V E M B E R	5	RoboCop 3	Orion Pictures	Fred Dekker (director/screenplay); Frank Miller (screenplay); Robert John Burke, Nancy Allen, Jill Hennessy, Remy Ryan, John Castle, Rip Torn, Jodi Long, John Posey, Mako, Felton Perry, Robert DoQui, Bradley Whitford, CCH Pounder, Daniel von Bargen, Stanley Anderson, Stephen Root, Mario Machado, Eva LaRue Callahan, Jeff Garlin, Lee Arenberg, Shane Black, David de Vries, Gary Bullock, Jesse D. Goins, Paul McCrane, Kurtwood Smith, Ray Wise, Bruce Locke, S.D. Nemeth, Judson Vaughn, Randall Taylor, Angie Bolling, Wilbur Fitzgerald, Nick Conti	
N O V E M B E R	5	Ruby in Paradise	October Films	Victor Nunez (director/screenplay); Ashley Judd, Todd Field, Bentley Mitchum, Allison Dean, Dorothy Lyman, Betsy Douds, Felicia Hernandez	
N O V E M B E R	5	The Remains of the Day	Columbia Pictures	James Ivory (director); Ruth Prawer Jhabvala (screenplay); Anthony Hopkins, Emma Thompson, James Fox, Christopher Reeve, Peter Vaughan, Hugh Grant, John Haycraft, Michael Lonsdale, Jeffry Wickham, Paula Jacobs, Ben Chaplin, Abigail Harrison, Rupert Vansittart, Patrick Godfrey, Peter Halliday, Peter Cellier, Peter Eyre, Terence Bayler, Tony Aitken, Tim Pigott-Smith, Lena Headey, Paul Copley, Pip Torrens, Brigitte Kahn, Wolf Kahler	
N O V E M B E R	10	Carlito's Way	Universal Pictures	Brian De Palma (director); David Koepp (screenplay); Al Pacino, Sean Penn, Penelope Ann Miller, John Leguizamo, Luis Guzmán, James Rebhorn, Joseph Siravo, Viggo Mortensen, Richard Foronjy, Jorge Porcel, John Augstin Ortiz, Angel Salazar, Al Israel, Rick Aviles, Jaime Sánchez, Paul Mazursky, Jon Seda, Chuck Zito, Richard Council, Mel Gorham, Rocco Sisto, John Finn, Brian Tarantina, John Michael Bolger, Sharmagne Leland-St. John, Orlando Urdaneta, Vincent Pastore, Cynthia Lamontagne, Bo Dietl, Marc Anthony, Coati Mundi, Saundra Santiago, Bill Weeden, Ingrid Rogers, Frank Minucci, Jaime Tirelli	
N O V E M B E R	12	Ernest Rides Again	Emshell Producers	John R. Cherry III (director/screenplay); William M. Akers (screenplay); Jim Varney, Ron James, Tom Butler, Linda Kash	
N O V E M B E R	12	My Life	Columbia Pictures / Zucker Brothers Productions	Bruce Joel Rubin (director/screenplay); Michael Keaton, Nicole Kidman, Bradley Whitford, Rebecca Schull, Michael Constantine, Queen Latifah, Mark Holton, Haing S. Ngor, Lee Garlington, Romy Rosemont, Richard Schiff, Brenda Strong, Bruce Jarchow, Kenneth Tigar, Sylvia Kauders, Magda Harout, Charlotte Zucker, Lissa Walters	
N O V E M B E R	12	The Piano	Miramax Films	Jane Campion (director/screenplay); Holly Hunter, Harvey Keitel, Sam Neill, Anna Paquin, Kerry Walker, Genevieve Lemon, Tungia Baker, Ian Mune, Cliff Curtis, Rose McIver, Mika Haka	
N O V E M B E R	12	The Three Musketeers	Walt Disney Pictures / Caravan Pictures	Stephen Herek (director); David Loughery (screenplay); Charlie Sheen, Kiefer Sutherland, Chris O'Donnell, Oliver Platt, Tim Curry, Rebecca De Mornay, Gabrielle Anwar, Michael Wincott, Paul McGann, Julie Delpy, Hugh O'Conor, Christopher Adamson, Philip Tan, Erwin Leder, Herbert Fux	
N O V E M B E R	17	Ed and His Dead Mother	ITC Entertainment	Jonathan Wacks (director); Chuck Hughes (screenplay); Steve Buscemi, Ned Beatty, John Glover, Miriam Margoyles, Sam Jenkins, Jon Gries, Eric Christmas, Gary Farmer, Dawn Hudson, Rance Howard, Warren Munson, Biff Yeager, Harper Roisman, Robert Harvey, Eric Poppick, Carol Schlanger	
N O V E M B E R	17	The Saint of Fort Washington	Warner Bros. Pictures	Tim Hunter (director); Lyle Kessler (screenplay); Matt Dillon, Danny Glover, Rick Aviles, Nina Siemaszko, Ving Rhames, Joe Seneca, Bahni Turpin, Kevin Corrigan, Brian Tarantina, Irma St. Paule, Aida Turturro, Liz Larsen, Frances Chaney, Octavia St. Laurent, Rosaleen Linehan, Black 47, Daniel von Bargen, Ellis Williams, Stephen Mendillo, Michael Badalucco, Victor Slezak, Michael Waldron, Peter Appel, Eddie Marrero, John Rothman, Harry Ellington, Ralph Hughes, Adam Trese	
N O V E M B E R	17	Knights	Paramount Home Video / Kings Road Entertainment	Albert Pyun (director/screenplay); Kathy Long, Kris Kristofferson, Lance Henriksen	
N O V E M B E R	19	Addams Family Values	Paramount Pictures	Barry Sonnenfeld (director); Paul Rudnick (screenplay); Anjelica Huston, Raúl Juliá, Christopher Lloyd, Joan Cusack, Christina Ricci, Carol Kane, Jimmy Workman, Carel Struycken, David Krumholtz, Christopher Hart, Dana Ivey, Peter MacNicol, Christine Baranski, Mercedes McNab, Sam McMurray, Harriet Sansom Harris, Julie Halston, Barry Sonnenfeld, Nathan Lane, John Franklin, Charles Busch, Laura Esterman, Steven M. Martin, Douglas Brian Martin, Allegra Kent, Lois de Banzie, Vickilyn Reynolds, Cynthia Nixon, David Hyde Pierce, Peter Graves, Monet Mazur, Ian Abercrombie, Chris Ellis, Camille Saviola, Tony Shalhoub, Kaitlyn Hooper, Kristen Hooper, Cheryl Chase	
N O V E M B E R	19	Dangerous Game	Metro-Goldwyn-Mayer	Abel Ferrara (director); Nicholas St. John (screenplay); Harvey Keitel, Madonna, James Russo, Nancy Ferrara, Reilly Murphy, Victor Argo, Leonard L. Thomas, Randy Sabusawa, Christina Fulton, Glenn Plummer, Richard Belzer, Annie McEnroe, Sammy Jack Pressman	
N O V E M B E R	19	Man's Best Friend	New Line Cinema	John Lafia (director/screenplay); Ally Sheedy, Lance Henriksen, Robert Costanzo, Fredric Lehne, John Cassini, J.D. Daniels, William Sanderson, Frank Welker	
N O V E M B E R	24	Josh and S.A.M.	Columbia Pictures / Castle Rock Entertainment	Billy Weber (director); Frank Deese (screenplay); Jacob Tierney, Noah Fleiss, Martha Plimpton, Stephen Tobolowsky, Joan Allen, Chris Penn, Maury Chaykin, Ronald Guttman, Udo Kier, Jake Gyllenhaal, Ann Hearn, Christian Clemenson, Allan Arbus, Danny Tamberelli, Don McManus, Amy Wright, Raye Birk, Annie McEnroe, Pamella D'Pella, Valerie Wildman, John Voldstad	
N O V E M B E R	24	Mrs. Doubtfire	20th Century Fox	Chris Columbus (director); Randi Mayem Singer, Leslie Dixon (screenplay); Robin Williams, Sally Field, Pierce Brosnan, Harvey Fierstein, Polly Holliday, Lisa Jakub, Matthew Lawrence, Mara Wilson, Robert Prosky, Anne Haney, Scott Capurro, Sydney Walker, Martin Mull, Terence McGovern, Ralph Peduto, Scott Beach, Rick Overton, Paul Guilfoyle, Molly McClure, William Newman, Raja Gosnell	
N O V E M B E R	24	The Nutcracker	Warner Bros. Pictures	Emile Ardolino (director); Susan Cooper (screenplay); Darci Kistler, Damian Woetzel, Kyra Nichols, Wendy Whelan, Margaret Tracey, Gen Horiuchi, Tom Gold, Lourdes López, Nilas Martins, William Otto, Peter Reznick, Karin von Aroldingen, Edward Bigelow, Heather Watts, Robert LaFosse, Bart Robinson Cook, Jessica Lynn Cohen, Macaulay Culkin, Kevin Kline, Katrina Killian, Roma Sosenko, Michael Byars, Robert D. Lyon, Maureen C. McFadden Devlin	
N O V E M B E R	24	A Perfect World	Warner Bros. Pictures	Clint Eastwood (director); John Lee Hancock (screenplay); Kevin Costner, Clint Eastwood, Laura Dern, T.J. Lowther, Keith Szarabajka, Leo Burmester, Bruce McGill, Paul Hewitt, Bradley Whitford, Ray McKinnon, Mary Alice, Wayne Dehart, Linda Hart, Cameron Finley, Gil Glasgow, Marco Perella, Darryl Cox, Rodger Boyce, Lucy Lee Flippin, Dennis Letts, Margaret Bowman, John M. Jackson, Kevin Jamal Woods, Tony Frank, Libby Villari	
N O V E M B E R	24	We're Back! A Dinosaur's Story	Universal Pictures / Amblimation	Phil Nibbelink, Simon Wells (directors); John Patrick Shanley (screenplay); John Goodman, Blaze Berdahl, Rhea Perlman, Jay Leno, René LeVant, Felicity Kendal, Charles Fleischer, Walter Cronkite, Joey Shea, Julia Child, Kenneth Mars, Yeardley Smith, Martin Short, Larry King, Nigel Pegram, Catherine Battistone, Bill Capizzi, Jim Carter, J.D. Daniels, Sandra Dickinson, Peter Elliott, David Holt, Ron Karabatsos, Shelley Thompson, Brian Cummings, Linda Gary	
N O V E M B E R	27	Full Eclipse	HBO Pictures / Citadel Entertainment / Tapestry Films	Anthony Hickox (director); Richard Christian Matheson, Michael Reaves (screenplay); Mario Van Peebles, Bruce Payne, Patsy Kensit, Anthony John Denison, Jason Beghe, Paula Marshall, John Verea, Dean Norris, Willie C. Carpenter, Victoria Rowell, Scott Paulin, Mel Winkler, Joseph Culp, Joey DePinto, John Apicella, Brent Bolthouse, Jennifer Rubin	
D E C E M B E R	3	A Dangerous Woman	Gramercy Pictures / Amblin Entertainment	Stephen Gyllenhaal (director); Naomi Foner (screenplay); Debra Winger, Barbara Hershey, Gabriel Byrne, Laurie Metcalf, John Terry, Maggie Gyllenhaal, Jake Gyllenhaal, Chloe Webb, David Strathairn, Jan Hooks, Richard Riehle	
D E C E M B E R	3	The Snapper	Miramax Films	Stephen Frears (director); Roddy Doyle (screenplay); Colm Meaney, Tina Kellegher, Brendan Gleeson, Pat Laffan, Rynagh O'Grady, Stanley Townsend, Stuart Dunne, Barbara Bergin, Birdy Sweeney, Cathleen Delany, Cathy Belton, Tom Murphy, Stephen Kennedy, Roddy Doyle, Karen Woodley, Virginia Cole, Denis Menton, Peter Rowen, Eanna MacLiam, Colm O'Byrne, Joanne Gerrard, Ciara Duffy, Deirdre and Dierdre O'Brien, Aisling Conlan, Alannagh McMullen, Sheila Flitton, Jack Lynch, Ronan Wilmot	
D E C E M B E R	5	Hollyrock-a-Bye Baby	ABC / Hanna-Barbera Cartoons / Turner Entertainment	William Hanna (director); Rich Fogel, Max Seidenberg (screenplay); Henry Corden, Jean Vander Pyl, Kath Soucie, Frank Welker, B.J. Ward, Jerry Houser, Janet Waldo, John Stephenson, Charlie Adler, Mark Hamill, Brad Garrett, Michael Bell, Howard Morris, Don Messick, Russi Taylor, Raquel Welch, Mary Hart, John Tesh, Charlie Brill, Ruth Buzzi, Gordon Hunt, Allan Lurie, Brian Stokes Mitchell, Megan Mullally, Ronnie Schell, April Winchell	
D E C E M B E R	5	The War Room	October Films	Chris Hegedus, D.A. Pennebaker (directors); Bill Clinton, James Carville, George Stephanopoulos, Paul Begala, Dee Dee Myers, Mandy Grunwald, Bob Boorstin, Stan Greenberg, Mickey Kantor, Harold Ickes, Mary Matalin, Rahm Emanuel, George H.W. Bush, H. Ross Perot, Paul Tsongas, Jerry Brown, Mike Donilon, Mitchell Schwartz, Hillary Rodham Clinton, Chelsea Clinton, Betty Currie-Mitchell, Sam Donaldson, Gennifer Flowers, Albert Gore Jr., Tipper Gore, Mark Halperin, Nancy McFadden, Joseph Kennedy, Cid Moreira, Ann Richards	
D E C E M B E R	8	Six Degrees of Separation	Metro-Goldwyn-Mayer	Fred Schepisi (director); John Guare (screenplay); Stockard Channing, Will Smith, Donald Sutherland, Ian McKellen, Mary Beth Hurt, Heather Graham, Bruce Davison, Richard Masur, Anthony Michael Hall, Daniel von Bargen, Eric Thal, Anthony Rapp, Oz Perkins, Catherine Kellner, J.J. Abrams, Kitty Carlisle, Brooke Hayward, Peter Duchin, Maeve McGuire, Kelly Bishop, Chuck Close, Todd Alcott, Madhur Jaffrey, Cleo King, Hélène Cardona	
D E C E M B E R	10	Geronimo: An American Legend	Columbia Pictures	Walter Hill (director); John Milius, Larry Gross (screenplay); Wes Studi, Jason Patric, Gene Hackman, Robert Duvall, Matt Damon, Pato Hoffmann, Rodney A. Grant, Kevin Tighe, Steve Reevis, Carlos Palomino, Victor Aaron, Stuart Proud Eagle Grant, Scott Wilson, Stephen McHattie, John Finn, Lee de Broux, Rino Thunder, Mark Boone Junior, M.C. Gainey, Jonathan Ward, Luis Contreras, Jim Beaver, Billy Brown, Michael Adams	
D E C E M B E R	10	Sister Act 2: Back in the Habit	Touchstone Pictures	Bill Duke (director); James Orr, Jim Cruickshank, Judi Ann Mason (screenplay); Whoopi Goldberg, Kathy Najimy, James Coburn, Maggie Smith, Barnard Hughes, Mary Wickes, Michael Jeter, Wendy Makkena, Sheryl Lee Ralph, Robert Pastorelli, Thomas Gottschalk, Lauryn Hill, Brad Sullivan, Alanna Ubach, Ryan Toby, Ron Johnson, Jennifer Love Hewitt, Devin Kamin, Christian Fitzharris, Tanya Blount, Mehran Marcos Sedghi, Erica Atkins, Deondray Gossett, Monica Calhoun, Deedee Magno Hall, Riley Weston, Alexandrea Martin, Pat Crawford Brown, Susan Browning, Edith Díaz, Ellen Albertini Dow, Beth Fowler, Susan Johnson, Ruth Kobart, Darlene Koldenhoven, Carmen Zapata, Andrea Robinson, Jenifer Lewis, Sharon Brown, Kevin Alexander Stea, Warren Frost, Robin Gammell, Yolanda Whitaker, Bill Duke, Sydney Lassick, Bill Irwin, Sally Stevens, Terri J. Vaughn	
D E C E M B E R	10	Wayne's World 2	Paramount Pictures	Stephen Surjik (director); Mike Myers, Bonnie Turner, Terry Turner (screenplay); Mike Myers, Dana Carvey, Christopher Walken, Tia Carrere, Chris Farley, Ralph Brown, James Hong, Rip Taylor, Lee Tergesen, Jennifer Miller, Heather Locklear, Bob Odenkirk, Robert Smigel, Larry Sellers, Bobby Slayton, Frank DiLeo, Kevin Pollak, Olivia d'Abo, Kim Basinger, Drew Barrymore, Harry Shearer, Ted McGinley, Tim Meadows, Scott Coffey, Jay Leno, Charlton Heston, Ed O'Neill, Aerosmith, Stephen Surjik, Gavin Grazer, Michael A. Nickles	
D E C E M B E R	11	Attack of the 50 Ft. Woman	HBO Pictures	Christopher Guest (director); Joseph Dougherty, Mark Hanna (screenplay); Daryl Hannah, Daniel Baldwin, William Windom, Christi Conaway, Paul Benedict, O'Neal Compton, Victoria Haas, Frances Fisher, Lewis Arquette, Xander Berkeley, Hamilton Camp, Richard Edson, Hilary Shepard Turner, Barry Watson	
D E C E M B E R	15	Schindler's List	Universal Pictures / Amblin Entertainment	Steven Spielberg (director); Steven Zaillian (screenplay); Liam Neeson, Ben Kingsley, Ralph Fiennes, Caroline Goodall, Jonathan Sagall, Embeth Davidtz, Malgorzata Gebel, Mark Ivanir, Beatrice Macola, Andrzej Seweryn, Friedrich von Thun, Jerzy Nowak, Norbert Weisser, Anna Mucha, Adi Nitzan, Piotr Polk, Rami Heuberger, Ezra Dagan, Elina Löwensohn, Hans-Jorg Assmann, Hans-Michael Rehberg, Daniel Del Ponte, August Schmolzer, Ludger Pistor, Oliwia Dabrowska	
D E C E M B E R	17	Beethoven's 2nd	Universal Pictures / Northern Lights Entertainment	Rod Daniel (director); Len Blum (screenplay); Charles Grodin, Bonnie Hunt, Nicholle Tom, Christopher Castile, Sarah Rose Karr, Debi Mazar, Chris Penn, Ashley Hamilton, Danny Masterson, Catherine Reitman, Maury Chaykin, Heather McComb, Scott Waara, Jeff Corey, Virginia Capers, Devon Gummersall, Jordan Bond, Pat Jankiewicz, Tom Dugan, Don Lake, Kevin Dunn, William Schallert	
D E C E M B E R	17	The Pelican Brief	Warner Bros. Pictures	Alan J. Pakula (director/screenplay); Julia Roberts, Denzel Washington, Sam Shepard, Hume Cronyn, Stanley Tucci, John Heard, John Lithgow, Tony Goldwyn, James B. Sikking, William Atherton, Robert Culp, Anthony Heald, Stanley Anderson, Cynthia Nixon, Jake Weber, Ralph Cosham, Casey Biggs, Nicholas Woodeson, John Finn, Christopher Murray, Kevin Geer, Joe Chrest, Richard Bauer, Ralph Cosham, Edwin Newman, Carol Sutton, Saundra Quarterman, Jerry Van Dyke	
D E C E M B E R	17	What's Eating Gilbert Grape	Paramount Pictures	Lasse Hallström (director); Peter Hedges (screenplay); Johnny Depp, Juliette Lewis, Mary Steenburgen, Leonardo DiCaprio, John C. Reilly, Darlene Cates, Laura Harrington, Mary Kate Schellhardt, Kevin Tighe, Crispin Glover, Penelope Branning, Libby Villari, Adrienne King	
D E C E M B E R	17	Wrestling Ernest Hemingway	Warner Bros. Pictures	Randa Haines (director); Steve Conrad (screenplay); Robert Duvall, Richard Harris, Shirley MacLaine, Sandra Bullock, Micole Mercurio, Marty Belafsky, Harold Bergman, Piper Laurie, Ed Amatrudo, Adam Arkin	
D E C E M B E R	22	Philadelphia	TriStar Pictures / A Luta Continuta	Jonathan Demme (director); Ron Nyswaner (screenplay); Tom Hanks, Denzel Washington, Jason Robards, Mary Steenburgen, Antonio Banderas, Ron Vawter, Robert Ridgely, Charles Napier, Obba Babatunde, Robert Castle, Roger Corman, Ann Dowd, David Drake, Karen Finley, John Bedford Lloyd, Roberta Maxwell, Harry Northup, Bill Rowe, Anna Deavere Smith, Daniel von Bargen, Tracey Walter, Bradley Whitford, Chandra Wilson, Joanne Woodward, Adam LeFevre, Julius Erving, Ed Rendell, Gary Goetzman, Kenneth Utt, Lisa Summerour, Andre B. Blake, Daniel Chapman, Charles Glenn, Peter Jacobs, Paul Lazar, Warren Miller, Dan Olmstead, Joey Perillo, Lauren Roselli, Lisa Talerico, Kathryn Witt	
D E C E M B E R	25	Batman: Mask of the Phantasm	Warner Bros. Pictures / Warner Bros. Animation	Eric Radomski, Bruce Timm (directors); Alan Burnett, Paul Dini, Martin Pasko, Michael Reaves (screenplay); Kevin Conroy, Dana Delany, Hart Bochner, Stacy Keach, Abe Vigoda, Mark Hamill, Efrem Zimbalist Jr., Robert Costanzo, Dick Miller, John P. Ryan, Bob Hastings, Jane Downs, Pat Musick, Vernee Watson-Johnson, Ed Gilbert, Peter Renaday, Jeff Bennett, Charles Howerton, Thom Pinto, Marilu Henner, Neil Ross, Judi M. Durand, Arleen Sorkin	
D E C E M B E R	25	Grumpy Old Men	Warner Bros. Pictures	Donald Petrie (director); Mark Steven Johnson (screenplay); Jack Lemmon, Walter Matthau, Ann-Margret, Burgess Meredith, Daryl Hannah, Kevin Pollak, Ossie Davis, Buck Henry, Christopher McDonald, Steve Cochran, Joe Howard, John Carroll Lynch, Peggy Rea, Katie Sagona	
D E C E M B E R	25	Heaven & Earth	Warner Bros. Pictures	Oliver Stone (director/screenplay); Tommy Lee Jones, Joan Chen, Haing S. Ngor, Hiep Thi Le, Thuan K. Nguyen, Dustin Nguyen, Vinh Dang, Mai Le Ho, Dale Dye, Debbie Reynolds, Conchata Ferrell, Michael Paul Chan, Robert John Burke, Tim Guinee, Timothy Carhart, Annie McEnroe, Marianne Muellerleile, Marshall Bell, Jeffrey Jones, Donal Logue	
D E C E M B E R	25	Shadowlands	Savoy Pictures	Richard Attenborough (director); William Nicholson (screenplay); Anthony Hopkins, Debra Winger, Edward Hardwicke, Joseph Mazzello, James Frain, Julian Fellowes, Michael Denison, John Wood, Peter Firth	
D E C E M B E R	25	Tombstone	Hollywood Pictures / Cinergi Pictures	George P. Cosmatos (director); Kevin Jarre (screenplay); Kurt Russell, Val Kilmer, Sam Elliott, Bill Paxton, Powers Boothe, Dana Delany, Michael Biehn, Charlton Heston, Jason Priestley, Jon Tenney, Stephen Lang, Thomas Haden Church, Paula Malcomson, Lisa Collins, John Philbin, Dana Wheeler-Nicholson, Joanna Pacula, Michael Rooker, Harry Carey Jr., Billy Bob Thornton, Tomas Arana, Paul Ben-Victor, Robert John Burke, Billy Zane, John Corbett, Terry O'Quinn, Robert Mitchum, Buck Taylor, Gary Clarke, Frank Stallone, Pedro Armendáriz Jr., Grant James, Don Collier, Cecil Hoffman, Christopher Mitchum	
D E C E M B E R	29	Ghost in the Machine	20th Century Fox	Rachel Talalay (director); William Davies, William Osborne (screenplay); Karen Allen, Chris Mulkey, Ted Marcoux, Wil Horneff, Jessica Walter, Brandon Quintin Adams, Rick Ducommun, Jack Laufer, Shevonne Durkin, Richard McKenzie, Nancy Fish, Richard Schiff	
D E C E M B E R	29	In the Name of the Father	Universal Pictures	Jim Sheridan (director/screenplay); Terry George (screenplay); Daniel Day-Lewis, Emma Thompson, Pete Postlethwaite, John Lynch, Corin Redgrave, Beatie Edney, John Benfield, Paterson Joseph, Marie Jones, Gerard McSorley, Frank Harper, Mark Sheppard, Don Baker, Tom Wilkinson	

== See also ==
- List of 1993 box office number-one films in the United States
- 1993 in the United States
