= Bill Dance =

Bill Dance may refer to:

- Bill Dance (casting director) (fl. 1980s–2020s), American casting director
- Bill Dance (television host) (born 1940), angler and host of Bill Dance Outdoors, a fishing television series

== See also ==
- Bill Dancy (born 1951), American baseball manager and coach
- William Dance (1755–1840), English pianist and violinist
