= A Perfect World =

1993 crime film by Clint Eastwood

- Theatrical release poster by Bill Gold
- Directed by: Clint Eastwood
- Written by: John Lee Hancock; Clint Eastwood (uncredited)
- Produced by: Mark Johnson; David Valdes
- Starring: Kevin Costner; Clint Eastwood; Laura Dern
- Cinematography: Jack N. Green
- Edited by: Joel Cox; Ron Spang
- Music by: Lennie Niehaus
- Production company: Malpaso Productions
- Distributed by: Warner Bros.
- Release date: November 24, 1993 (United States)
- Running time: 138 minutes
- Country: United States
- Language: English
- Budget: $30 million
- Box office: $135 million

A Perfect World is a 1993 American crime thriller film directed by Clint Eastwood. It stars Kevin Costner as an escaped convict who takes a young boy (T. J. Lowther) hostage and attempts to escape on the road with the child. Eastwood co-stars as a Texas Ranger in pursuit of the convict.

Though the film was not a box-office success in North America and grossed only $31 million for its November 1993 release, it managed to gross $104 million internationally for a total of $135 million worldwide. The film received critical acclaim for acting (particularly from Kevin Costner), directing, editing, themes, cinematography, and musical score. It is also considered one of Eastwood's best films by some critics and fans.

== Plot ==
In 1963 Texas, convicts Robert "Butch" Haynes and Terry Pugh escape from the state penitentiary in Huntsville, Texas. Looking for food, Terry stumbles into a house where eight-year-old Phillip Perry lives with his devout Jehovah's Witness mother Gladys and two sisters. Butch follows and hits Terry to make him stop molesting the mother. Needing a hostage to aid their escape, Butch kidnaps Phillip. Terry and he escape and start driving north, but when Terry attempts to force himself on a half-naked Phillip, Butch shoots him knowing that sooner or later Terry will try to kill both of them.

Meanwhile, Red Garnett, chief of the Texas Rangers, is in pursuit. With criminologist Sally Gerber and FBI sharpshooter Bobby Lee in tow, Red wants to recover Butch and Phillip before they cross the Texas border. Also, though Butch does not realize it, Red has a history with him. When Butch was a teenager, he stole a car, and Red was the arresting officer. Butch was living with his abusive father, also a criminal, at the time. Due to his age and it being his first offense, Butch was supposed to get a lenient sentence. Red, however, convinced himself that prison would straighten Butch out, and asked the judge to give the young man a harsh sentence. Years later, Red realizes that the harsher sentence only made Butch into the criminal he feared he would become.

Phillip never participated in Halloween or Christmas celebrations due to his religion. Escaping with Butch, however, Phillip experiences a freedom that he finds exhilarating, as Butch allows him the kind of indulgences he has been forbidden, including the wearing of a shoplifted Casper the Friendly Ghost costume. Phillip becomes increasingly aware of his surroundings, and with encouragement from Butch, begins to learn how to make independent decisions on what is wrong and right. Butch finds himself drawn into giving Phillip the kind of fatherly presence he himself never had.

Butch and Phillip try to reach New Mexico, but discover that the highway they are driving on is unfinished. While asleep in their car in a cornfield, they encounter farmer Mack and his family - Lottie his wife, and his grandson Cleveland. Mack frequently abuses Cleveland, which Butch tries to tolerate, but when Mack discovers who Butch is, Butch puts a stop to the abuse. He beats Mack and plans on killing him, but Phillip picks up Butch's gun and shoots Butch in the stomach. Phillip walks out of the house, drops the gun into a well, throws the car keys away, and runs across a meadow. Butch follows, and rests at the tree Phillip climbed. Phillip apologizes for shooting Butch, who tells him he did the right thing.

Red's team surrounds the field where Phillip and Butch are situated, and Butch sends the boy to his mother, who arrived by helicopter and to whom Butch has made promise to take Phillip trick-or-treating every year. Unwilling to leave the already wounded Butch, Phillip runs back and hugs him – a gesture, which along with his knowledge of who Butch is, convinces Red that he can resolve the situation peacefully. His plans are thwarted, however, when Bobby Lee, mistaking one of Butch's gestures to mean he is about to draw a gun, shoots him in the chest, killing him. An enraged Red punches Bobby Lee and Sally kicks him in the groin before walking away. Phillip is then reunited with his mother, and they leave in a helicopter with Phillip holding Butch's most prized possession, a postcard from Alaska, where he had hoped to find his own father.

== Cast ==
- Kevin Costner as Robert "Butch" Haynes
- Clint Eastwood as Chief "Red" Garnett
- Laura Dern as Sally Gerber
- T. J. Lowther as Phillip "Buzz" Perry
- Jennifer Griffin as Gladys Perry, Phillip's mother
- Keith Szarabajka as Terry Pugh
- Leo Burmester as Chief Deputy Tom Adler
- Bruce McGill as Paul Saunders, governor's aide
- Paul Hewitt as Dick Suttle
- Bradley Whitford as FBI Special Agent Bobby Lee
- Ray McKinnon as Deputy Bradley
- Woody Watson as Lt. Hendricks
- Mary Alice as Lottie
- John M. Jackson as Bob Fielder
- Wayne Dehart as Mack
- Linda Hart as Eileen
- Cameron Finley as Bob Fielder Jr.
- Gil Glasgow as Pete
- Marco Perella as Trooper
- Margaret Bowman as Trick 'r Treat Lady
- James Jeter as Old-Timer

== Production ==
Steven Spielberg was interested in directing the film, but was unavailable due to scheduling commitments for Jurassic Park. However, one of the film's cast, Laura Dern, heard about the project and was subsequently cast as Sally Gerber.

Eastwood initially read the screenplay for A Perfect World while filming In the Line of Fire. He was also in the midst of campaigning for the Academy Awards with Unforgiven and was eager to work on a project where he could focus primarily on directing. When Kevin Costner was approached to play Butch Haynes, he suggested that Eastwood himself should play Red Garnett. Eastwood agreed; since his screen time as Garnett was limited, he could spend most of his time behind the camera.

Screenwriter John Lee Hancock said part of the idea for the character of Phillip and his Casper costume came from a childhood memory he had of his brother running around a Texas field in such a costume.

The film was shot in Austin, Texas, and Martindale, Texas, in between San Marcos and Lockhart in the spring and summer of 1993. At one point, Eastwood filmed a scene with Costner's extra when Costner was not ready in time.

== Reception ==
=== Box office ===
A Perfect World was released in North American theaters on November 24, 1993, grossing $31.1 million in box-office receipts in the United States and Canada. The film's success was far better elsewhere, with an international gross of $102.5 million for a total of $135 million. About the box-office reception, Clint Eastwood said: "I always felt this movie was high risk. I just liked the story. Sure, a lot of people are disappointed, but if you don't grow, you just get in a rut. You can make sequels and imitations and make some dough. But you've got to make a wide variety of things so someday people look back and say, 'Hey, he tried, he did this, he took some risks.' In this film, the audience was probably expecting two guys who'd be at each other or two pals on a wild adventure. It wasn't that kind of film."

=== Critical response ===
The film has a 78% score on review aggregator Rotten Tomatoes, based on 32 critic reviews with an average rating of 7.3/10. The site's critical consensus states, "Despite some formulaic touches, Clint Eastwood's haunting, ambiguous crime drama is smart and gritty, and features a bravura performance from Kevin Costner as a prison escapee on the run". On Metacritic, the film has a weighted average score of 71 out of 100, based on 24 critics, indicating "generally favorable" reviews. Audiences polled by CinemaScore gave the film an average grade of "B+" on an A+ to F scale.

Positive reviews praised the film for its emotional depth and accurate depiction of the psychology of hostage situations. Critics argued Kevin Costner's subtly nuanced portrayal of the escaped convict Butch Haynes forms the cornerstone of the film's success and is one of the actor's finest performances. Roger Ebert of the Chicago Sun-Times called it "a film any director alive might be proud to sign," while The New York Times hailed it as "a deeply felt, deceptively simple film that marks the high point of Mr. Eastwood's directing career thus far."

Though praise was given to Costner's performance, some critics cited the film's length and "rambling" nature as drawbacks. Owen Gleiberman of Entertainment Weekly wrote, "Costner seems about as pathological as a koala bear, and his gentle charisma reinforces the film's touchy-feely theme," and that "the trouble with Eastwood's attempt to make a thriller with 'heart' is that, in retreating from his darker impulses, he muffles his own voice as a moviemaker. Of all directors, he should know that a character like Butch can't be this easily forgiven." Desson Howe of The Washington Post said, "Within its narrow, unambitious, commercial boundaries, the movie is highly watchable," but disjointed story-wise.

In the years since its release, the film has been acclaimed by critics as one of Eastwood's most satisfying and underrated directorial achievements, and the scenes between the convict (Costner) and his young captive (Lowther) have been acknowledged as some of the most delicately crafted sequences in all of Eastwood's body of work. In 2021, Liam Gaughan of Collider praised the film for its examination of masculinity, writing, "Eastwood's films are frequently under fire for their political baggage, but A Perfect World doesn't lionize its characters or offer an easy solution. It presents a slice of reality, and the flawed characters forced to inhabit it."

Cahiers du Cinéma selected A Perfect World as the best film of 1993.

== See also ==
- Martin's Day (1985)

== Bibliography ==
- Hughes, Howard (2009). Aim for the Heart. London: I.B. Tauris. ISBN 978-1-84511-902-7.
