= Harley Tat =

American television producer, writer, journalist, and author

- Born: Seattle, Washington, U.S.
- Occupations: Television producer, writer, journalist, author

Harley Tat is an American television producer, writer, journalist, and author.

== Television writer and producer ==
A Seattle native, Tat began his career in Los Angeles as a television news magazine segment producer, working on A Current Affair, Extra, and Hard Copy, where he was a director as well.

During his time at A Current Affair, Tat produced a segment about Wanda Holloway, the Texas mother accused of murdering her daughter's cheerleading rival. Tat went on to appear as himself in the HBO television film about the event, The Positively True Adventures of the Alleged Texas Cheerleader-Murdering Mom.

Tat moved from news magazines to unscripted relationship shows, serving as executive producer for over a thousand episodes of Blind Date and The 5th Wheel for NBCUniversal. Tat is the creator and executive producer of the "You've Been Sacked" segments on Monday Night Football. He was the executive producer of more than 150 episodes of Whacked Out Sports, Whacked Out Videos, Knockout Sportsworld, and Sports Crash. In addition he was the executive producer for "My Viral Video" and "Dear Santa" and "Mobile Home Disaster" which he also directed.

Tat served as executive producer of the independent film Jess + Moss, which was accepted at the 2011 Sundance Film Festival.

== Other endeavors ==
Tat wrote The New Boy, a novel about a troubled rugby player in Washington state.

In 2012, Tat and James R. Kirk co-founded a media exploration company called Magic Ranch Entertainment that packages, produces, and distributes brand-infused content as a subsidiary of Kirk's Corporate Magic.
