= Said Faraj =

Omani footballer (born 1970)

Personal information
- Full name: Said Faraj Hassan Fadhel Al-Kathiri
- Date of birth: 14 December 1974 (age 51)
- Place of birth: Oman
- Height: 1.70 m (5 ft 7 in)
- Position: Forward

Senior career*
Years	Team	Apps	(Gls)
–1994	Salalah		
1994–2000	Dhofar		

International career
1984–1992	Oman	13	(2)
- * Club domestic league appearances and goals

Said Faraj Hassan Fadhel Al-Kathiri (Arabic: سعيد فرج; born 14 December 1974) is an Omani former footballer who played as a forward.

== Life and career ==
Faraj was born on 14 December 1974 in Oman. He mainly operated as a forward. He was known for his technical ability. He started his career with Salalah. He helped the club achieve promotion. In 1994, he signed for Dhofar. He helped the club win the league. He was the top scorer of the 1996–97 Omani League with nineteen goals. He was described as "considered one of the distinguished players among a group presented by the Dhofar stadiums for Omani football, who shone at the Gulf level".

He was an Oman youth international. He was an Oman international. He made thirteen appearances and scored two goals for the Oman national football team. He played for the Oman national football team at the 8th Arabian Gulf Cup. He also played for the Oman national football team for 1990 FIFA World Cup qualification. He was regarded as one of the most prominent Omani players during the 1990s.
