= T. J. Lowther =

American actor

- Occupation: Actor
- Years active: 1991–present

T. J. Lowther is an American actor. He started as a child star, appearing in Neon City in 1991 at the age of five. He is known for his role as Philip Perry in the 1993 Clint Eastwood film A Perfect World starring Kevin Costner. Lowther then moved into more roles on television, eventually a guest star role on an episode of the TV series Grey's Anatomy.
