= Bill Dance (casting director) =

American casting director

- Occupation: casting director
- Years active: 1975–present

Bill Dance is an American casting director based in Los Angeles.

== Personal life ==
Dance is a native Virginian, who grew up in the small town of Petersburg, Virginia. Bill Dance began his career initially dancing with the Richmond Ballet, and he spent time touring with U.S.O. shows. He then moved to Los Angeles, California in order to attend the University of California, Los Angeles in the Theater Department.

Eventually, Bill Dance graduated from UCLA with a B.A. in Theater Arts, and began his career as an actor. Stage performances include "Gene Kelly's A Salute to Broadway", "Wonderful Town", and "No No Nanette". Eventually he even went on to write, produce, and act in an original play that showcased in Los Angeles called "Mind Games".

== Career ==
After a successful career as a dancer/actor, Bill Dance began work as a casting director. He and his company, Bill Dance Casting has been continuously working in Hollywood for the last 30 years. Bill Dance has worked with such notable professionals as Ron Howard, Tim Burton, Brian Grazer, Joel Schumacher, Wes Craven, and Oliver Stone.

Bill Dance has specialized in both background and principle casting, with credits in films as varied as The Grinch, Yes Man, A Beautiful Mind, Alice in Wonderland and Seabiscuit.

== Films ==
- Murder of a Cat (2013)
- Saving Mr. Banks (2013)
- Project X (2012)
- Alice In Wonderland (2010)
- Angels & Demons (2009)
- 2012 (2009)
- Frost/Nixon (2008)
- Yes Man (2008)
- You Don't Mess With The Zohan (2008)
- The Number 23 (2007)
- Bobby (2006)
- Hollywoodland (2006)
- The Santa Clause 3: The Escape Clause (2006)
- Red-Eye (2005)
- Spanglish (2004)
- Seabiscuit (2003)
- A Beautiful Mind (2001)
- The Grinch (2000)
- EDtv (1999)
- 8mm (1999)
- American History X (1998)
- The Truman Show (1998)
- Devil In A Blue Dress (1995)
- When A Man Loves A Woman (1994)
- Far and Away (1992)
- The Doors (1991)
- Billy Bathgate (1991)
- Steel Magnolias (1989)

== Television ==
- Love That Girl! (2013–present)
- Mistresses (2013–present)
- Mad Men (2007–present)
- Deadwood (2004–2006)
- Monk (2002–2009)
