= David Sage =

American television actor (1940–2026)

- Born: David Rohan Sage; July 13, 1940; Syracuse, New York, U.S.
- Died: March 12, 2026 (aged 85)
- Education: Goodman School of Drama
- Occupation: Actor
- Years active: 1980–2002
- Spouse: Judy Sage

David Rohan Sage (July 13, 1940 – March 12, 2026) was an American character actor known for his various roles primarily in television in the 1980s and 1990s.

== Career ==
=== Film ===
Sage began his career in the Italian film Cannibal Holocaust (1980). He was in Galaxies Are Colliding (1992) and The Birdcage.

=== Television ===
Among the many shows in the 1980s, Sage was in were The Quest, The Greatest American Hero, Cagney & Lacey, Falcon Crest, Hill Street Blues, L.A. Law, and Murder, She Wrote. During the 1990s, he was in Seinfeld, Star Trek: The Next Generation, Monsters, Picket Fences, and The Young and the Restless. Sage was in nine made-for-TV movies: Love, Mary (1985), Shakedown on the Sunset Strip (1988), Rock Hudson (1990), Shattered Dreams (1990), Just Life (1990), A Private Matter (1992), Bonanza: The Return (1993), Babylon 5: The Gathering (1993), and Where Are My Children? (1994). He was cast in one miniseries: Guts and Glory: The Rise and Fall of Oliver North (1989).

== Personal life and death ==
Sage was born in Syracuse, New York, on July 13, 1940. He had a sister, Patti Morse.

He graduated from the Goodman School of Drama and performed in theater companies around the United States, before moving to Los Angeles in 1987. He ended his career in 2002, after a stroke.

Sage was married to Judy. He died on March 12, 2026, at the age of 85.

== Filmography ==
=== Film ===
Year	Title	Role	Director(s)	Notes
1980	Cannibal Holocaust	Alan's Father (Note: Uncredited)	Ruggero Deodato	Italian cannibal film
1992	Galaxies Are Colliding	Reverend	John Ryman	Comedy film
1996	The Birdcage	Senator Eli Jackson	Mike Nichols	Comedy film Based on the 1978 French film La Cage aux Folles, itself an adaptation of the 1973 play

=== Television ===
Year	Title	Role	Notes
1982	The Quest	Guest	Episode: "Last One There Is a Rotten Heir"
1983	Bay City Blues	Friedman	Episodes: "Beautiful Peoples"; "Zircons Are Forever"
1983	The Greatest American Hero	Offocial	Episode: "It's Only Rock and Roll"
1984	Hardcastle and McCormick	Dwayne Morton	Episode: "The George Street Motors"
1985	St. Elsewhere	Surgeon	Episode: "Red, White, Black, and Blue"
1985	Cagney & Lacey	Joseph Singleton	Episode: "Con Games"
1985	Me and Mom	Guest	Episode: "A Killing in the Market"
1985	Love, Mary	Dr. Miller	Made-For-TV movie directed by Robert Day
1985	Hunter	Guest	Episode: "Rich Girl"
1985–87	Falcon Crest	Minister; Judge	Episodes: "Confessions"; "Missed Connections"
1985–88	Highway to Heaven	Mr. Dolan; Coleman Charmin	3 episodes
1986	The Twilight Zone	Professor	Episode: "Profile in Silver / Button, Button"
1986	Newhart	President of a Country	Episode: "Pre-Nups"
1986	Hill Street Blues	Councilman	Episode: "The Best Defense"
1986–92	L.A. Law	Judge Aaron Hofheinz; Dr. Andrew Garreth	Episodes: "Gibbon Take"; "Second Time Around"
1987	Superior Court	Peter Holbrooke	Episode: "Teenage Abuse"
1988	Shakedown on the Sunset Strip	Mayor Fletcher Bowron	Made-For-TV movie directed by Walter Grauman
1988	Dallas	Senator Walter	Episode: "The Lady Singeth"
1988	Murder, She Wrote	Stavros	Episode: "Wearing of the Green"
1989	Studio 5-B	Dr. Restow	Episode: "The Aftermath"
1989	Guts and Glory: The Rise and Fall of Oliver North	Jenner	Miniseries directed by Mike Robe
1989	Christine Cromwell	Fred Mascarpone	Episode: "Easy Come, Easy Go"
1989	Anything But Love	Guest	Episode: "Breast of Friends"
1990	Rock Hudson	Harold Rhoden	Made-For-TV movie directed by John Nicolella; Based on My Husband, Rock Hudson by Phyllis Gates
1990	Who's the Boss?	Don Lester	Episode: "Dear Landlord"
1990	Shattered Dreams	Father Oberleiss	Made-For-TV movie directed by Robert Iscove
1990	Just Life	—N/a	Made-For-TV movie directed by Dan Lerner
1990	Monsters	Lawyer	Episode: "Cellmates"
1991	Gabriel's Fire	Judge Wittenbauer	Episode: "A Prayer for Goldsteins"
1991	She-Wolf of London	Horrace Menzies	Episode: "Habeas Corpses"
1991	Quantum Leap	Judge	Episode: "Future Boy – October 6, 1957"
1992	Roseanne	Priest	Episode: "Bingo"
1992	Star Trek: The Next Generation	Tamin	Episode: "Violations"
1992	A Private Matter	Doctor #3	Made-For-TV movie directed by Joan Micklin Silver
1992	Seinfeld	Dr. Dembrow	Episode: "The Wallet"
1993	Picket Fences	Judge Banks	Episode: "Duty Free Rome"
1993	Bonanza: The Return	Miller Swanson	Made-For-TV movie directed by Jerry Jameson
1993	Babylon 5: The Gathering	Business Man #2	Made-For-TV movie directed by Richard Compton
1994	Where Are My Children?	Federal Judge	Made-For-TV movie directed by George Kaczender; Part of The ABC Sunday Night Movie
1994–95	Lois & Clark: The New Adventures of Superman	John Cosgrove; Dr. Alan Golden	Episodes: "All Shook up"; "Target: Jimmy Olsen"
1995	Babylon 5	Centauri Merchant	Episode: "Acts of Sacrifice"
1995	Diagnosis Murder	Clayburgh the Jeweler	Episode: "All American Murder"
1995–96	Campus Cops	Captain Hingle	9 episodes
1997	The Young and the Restless	Reverend	Episode: "1.6034"
1998	JAG	Judge Lonigan	Episode: "The Martin Baker Fan Club"
1998	Any Day Now	Guest	Episode: "Quit Bein' Suck a Scaredy Cat"
1999	The West Wing	John Van Dyke	Episode: "Pilot"
2000	Get Real	Priest	Episode: "Absolution"
2002	The Practice	Judge Robert M. Breech	Episode: "Judge Knot"

== Sources ==
- Roberts, Jerry (2009). Encyclopedia of Television Film Directors (eBook). Lanham, Maryland: Scarecrow Press. p. 123. ISBN 978-0810861381.
- Tropiano, Stephen (2002). The Prime Time Closet: A History of Gays and Lesbians on TV. London: Bloomsbury Publishing. p. 149. ISBN 978-1-4768-4799-3.
