= Guts and Glory: The Rise and Fall of Oliver North =

1989 American drama miniseries

- Based on: Guts and Glory: The Rise and Fall of Oliver North by Ben Bradlee Jr.
- Screenplay by: Mike Robe
- Directed by: Mike Robe
- Starring: David Keith; Barnard Hughes; Annette O'Toole; Peter Boyle; Paul Dooley; Jim Fitzpatrick
- Composers: Arthur B. Rubinstein; Grover Helsley
- Country of origin: United States
- Original language: English
- No. of episodes: 2

Production
- Producers: Robert A. Papazian; James G. Hirsch
- Cinematography: Kees Van Oostrum
- Editors: Byron Brandt; Karen P. Sharp
- Running time: 187 minutes
- Production company: Papazian Productions

Original release
- Network: CBS
- Release: April 30 – May 2, 1989

Guts and Glory: The Rise and Fall of Oliver North is a 1989 American drama miniseries written and directed by Mike Robe. It is based on the 1988 book Guts and Glory: The Rise and Fall of Oliver North by Ben Bradlee Jr. The film stars David Keith, Barnard Hughes, Annette O'Toole, Peter Boyle, Paul Dooley and Jim Fitzpatrick. The film aired on CBS in two parts on April 30, 1989, and on May 2, 1989.

== Cast ==
- David Keith as Oliver North
- Barnard Hughes as William J. Casey
- Annette O'Toole as Betsy North
- Peter Boyle as John Poindexter
- Paul Dooley as Robert McFarlane
- Jim Fitzpatrick as Sergeant Major Collins
- Amy Stoch as Fawn Hall
- Bryan Clark as Ronald Reagan
- Donald Craig as William Clark
- Dakin Matthews as Edwin Meese
- Joe Dorsey as Richard Secord
- Miguel Ferrer as Scott Toney
- Madison Mason as Scott
- Suzanne Snyder as Alicia
- Scott Kraft as Deroy
- David Spielberg as Weissman
- David Sage as Jenner
- John Shearin as Ted
- Tony Colitti as Harv Konig
- Joel Colodner as Richard Stone
- Alex Henteloff as Bender
- F.J. O'Neil as Colonel Bernhardt
- Mike Pniewski as Lieutenant Jacobs
- Arlen Dean Snyder as Major General Schweitzer
- Michael Wren as Diaz
- Dwier Brown as Jeff Simms
- Terry O'Quinn as Aaron Sykes
- Reid Shelton as Donald Regan
- Warren Munson as Lee Hamilton
- Thomas Byrd as Robert Owen
- Maria Claire as Tait
- Anthony De Fonte as Manucher Ghorbanifar
- Don Jeffcoat as Stuart
- Tom Fuccello as Spitz Channel
- Jane Kean as Mrs. Cornwall
- Colby Kline as Dornin
- Rob Neukirch as Jack

== Ratings ==
Viewership and ratings for Guts and Glory: The Rise and Fall of Oliver North
No.	Title	Air date	Timeslot (ET)	Rating/share (households)	Viewers (millions)	Ref(s)
1	"Part 1"	April 30, 1989	Sunday 9:00 p.m.	14.0/23	20.2	
2	"Part 2"	May 2, 1989	Tuesday 9:00 p.m.	9.6/15	12.7	
