= Sunset Heat =

Sunset Heat may refer to:

- a brand of Escada
- Sunset Heat (film), a 1992 American film by John Nicolella
