= Rock Hudson =

American actor (1925–1985)

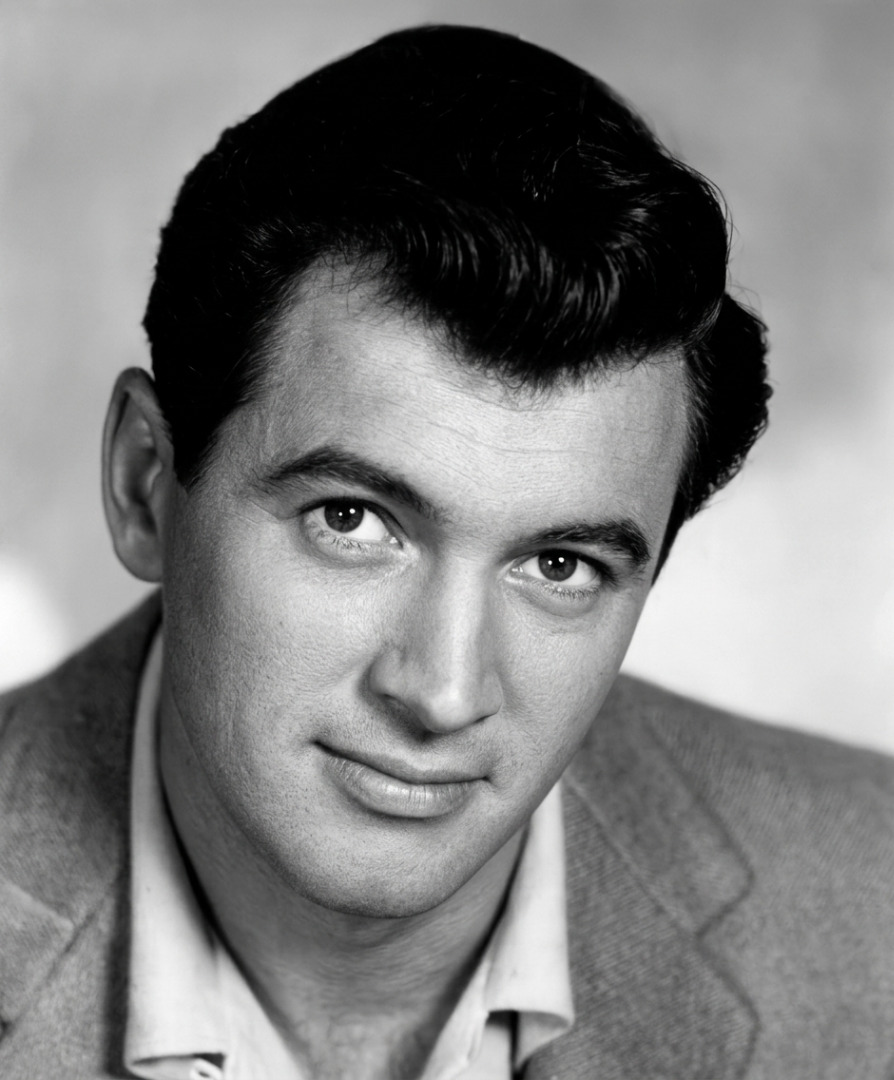
- Hudson in 1954
- Born: Roy Harold Scherer Jr. November 17, 1925; Winnetka, Illinois, U.S.
- Died: October 2, 1985 (aged 59); Beverly Hills, California, U.S.
- Cause of death: AIDS-related complications
- Monuments: Cenotaph at Forest Lawn Cemetery, Cathedral City, California
- Other name: Roy Harold Fitzgerald (adoption surname from stepfather)
- Occupation: Actor
- Years active: 1948–1985
- Spouse: Phyllis Gates (m. 1955; div. 1958)
- Awards: Hollywood Walk of Fame
- Military career
- Allegiance: United States
- Branch: United States Navy
- Service years: 1944–1946
- Rank: Seaman first class
- Conflicts: World War II; Second Philippines campaign

Rock Hudson (born Roy Harold Scherer Jr.; November 17, 1925 – October 2, 1985) was an American actor. One of the most popular film stars of his time, he had a screen career spanning more than three decades, and was a prominent figure in the Golden Age of Hollywood.

Hudson achieved stardom with his role in Magnificent Obsession (1954), followed by All That Heaven Allows (1955), and Giant (1956), for which he received a nomination for the Academy Award for Best Actor. Hudson also found continued success with a string of romantic comedies co-starring Doris Day: Pillow Talk (1959), Lover Come Back (1961), and Send Me No Flowers (1964). During the late 1960s, his films included Seconds (1966), Tobruk (1967), and Ice Station Zebra (1968). Unhappy with the film scripts he was offered, Hudson formed his own film production companies, first 7 Pictures Corporation, then later Gibraltar Pictures, to have more control over his roles; later he turned to television, starring in the mystery series McMillan & Wife (1971–1977). His last role was as a guest star on the fifth season (1984–1985) of the primetime ABC soap opera Dynasty, until an AIDS-related illness made it impossible for him to continue.

Although he was discreet regarding his sexual orientation, it was known among Hudson's colleagues in the film industry that he was gay. In 1984, Hudson was diagnosed with AIDS. The following year, he became one of the first celebrities to disclose his AIDS diagnosis. Hudson was the first major American celebrity to die from an AIDS-related illness, at age 59.

== Early life ==
Hudson was born Roy Harold Scherer Jr. on November 17, 1925, in Winnetka, Illinois, the only child of Katherine (née Wood), a homemaker and later telephone operator, and Roy Harold Scherer Sr., an auto mechanic. His father was of German and Swiss descent, while his mother was of Irish ancestry. He was raised as a Roman Catholic. During the Great Depression, Hudson's father lost his job and abandoned the family. Hudson's parents divorced when he was four years old; a few years later, in 1932, his mother married Wallace Fitzgerald, a former Marine Corps officer whom young Roy despised. Roy was adopted by Fitzgerald, and his legal name then became Roy Harold Fitzgerald. The marriage eventually ended in a bitter divorce and produced no children.

Hudson attended New Trier High School in Winnetka, the same high school as fellow movie stars Charlton Heston and Ann-Margret. At some point during his teenage years, he worked as an usher in a movie theater and developed an interest in acting. He tried out for a number of school plays, but failed to win any roles because he could not remember his lines, a problem that continued to occur through his early acting career.

== Career ==
=== 1943–1948: Military service to acting debut ===
Hudson graduated from high school in 1943, and the following year enlisted in the United States Navy during World War II. After training at the Great Lakes Naval Training Station, he departed San Francisco aboard the troop transport SS Lew Wallace with orders to report to Aviation Repair and Overhaul Unit 2, then located on Samar, Philippines, as an aircraft mechanic. In 1946, he returned to San Francisco aboard an aircraft carrier, and was discharged the same year.

Hudson then moved to Los Angeles to live with his biological father (who had remarried) and to pursue an acting career. Initially he worked at odd jobs, including as a truck driver. He applied to the University of Southern California's dramatics program, but was rejected because of poor grades. After he sent talent scout Henry Willson a picture of himself in 1947, Willson took him on as a client and changed the young actor's name to Rock Hudson; later in life, Hudson admitted that he hated the name. The name was coined by combining the Rock of Gibraltar and the Hudson River. Hudson later named his independent film production company Gibraltar Productions.

In 1948, Hudson made his acting debut with a small part in the Warner Bros. film Fighter Squadron directed by Raoul Walsh; according to a 21st-century source, it took 38 takes for Hudson to successfully deliver his only line in the film.

=== Universal-International ===
Hudson was signed to a long-term contract by Universal-International. There he received coaching in acting, singing, dancing, fencing and horseback riding, and began to be featured in film magazines where, being photogenic, he was promoted.

In 1949, Hudson received his first film credit, as Roc Hudson, in William Castle's Undertow, made by Universal.

In 1950, he acted in One Way Street, Shakedown, I Was a Shoplifter, Peggy, Winchester '73, and The Desert Hawk.

In 1951, Hudson was billed third in William Castle's The Fat Man. He played an important role as a boxer in Joseph Pevney's Iron Man. Other acting credit in that period include Bright Victory, Tomahawk, and Air Cadet.

=== Leading man ===
Hudson was promoted to leading man for Scarlet Angel (1952), opposite Yvonne De Carlo. He co-starred with Piper Laurie in Has Anybody Seen My Gal (1952), the first of his films directed by Douglas Sirk. He also appeared as a gambler in Bend of the River (1952). He supported the Nelson family in Here Come the Nelsons (1952).

In Horizons West (1952) Hudson supported Robert Ryan, but he was star again for The Lawless Breed (1953) and Seminole (1953). In 1953, he appeared in a Camel commercial that showed him on the set of Seminole.

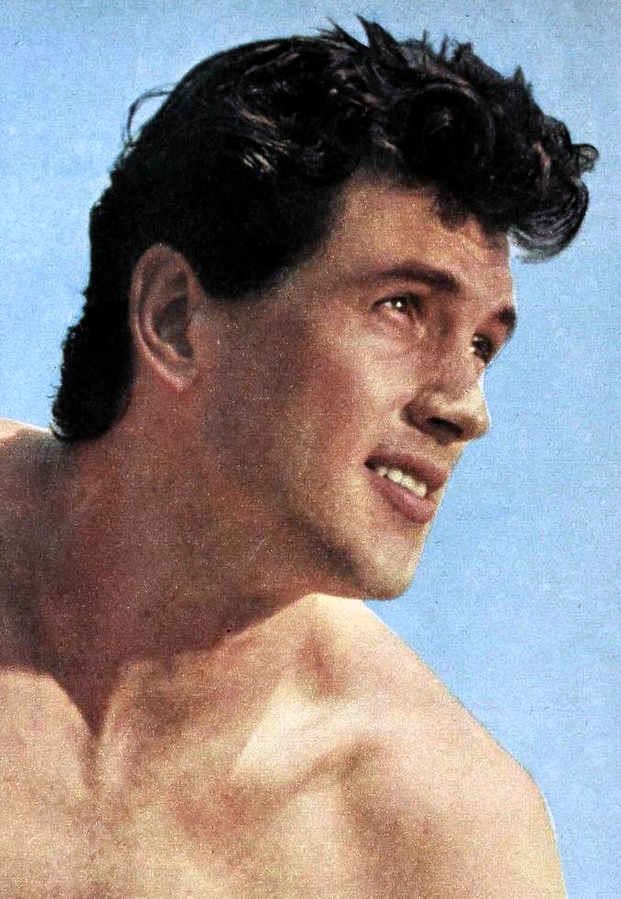
Hudson in January 1953

He and De Carlo were borrowed by RKO for Sea Devils (1953), an adventure set during the Napoleonic Wars. Back at Universal he played Harun al-Rashid in The Golden Blade (1953). There was Gun Fury (1953) and Back to God's Country (1953). Hudson had the title role in Taza, Son of Cochise (1954), directed by Sirk and produced by Ross Hunter.

=== Magnificent Obsession and stardom ===
Hudson was by now firmly established as a leading man in adventure films. What turned him into a star was the romantic drama Magnificent Obsession (1954), co-starring Jane Wyman, produced by Hunter and directed by Sirk. The film received positive reviews, with Modern Screen Magazine citing Hudson as the most popular actor of the year. It made over $5 million at the box office.

Hudson returned to adventure films with Bengal Brigade (1954), set during the Indian Mutiny, and Captain Lightfoot (1955), produced by Hunter and directed by Sirk. In 1954, exhibitors voted Hudson the 17th most popular star in the country. Hunter used him in the melodramas One Desire (1955) and All That Heaven Allows (1955), which reunited him with Sirk and Wyman.

=== Forming of 7 Pictures Corporation and Giant ===
On September 9, 1955, Hudson formed his first film production company, 7 Pictures Corporation, with partners producer Henry Ginsberg, his agent Henry Willson, and his lawyer Greg Bautzer. Hudson owned only 36% of the company's stocks, with Ginsberg owning the second-largest share with 35%, Wilson with 16%, and Bautzer with 5%; the remaining 8% was owned by Hudson's then-wife Phyllis Gates. Though Hudson's exclusive contract with Universal-International Pictures allowed him to produce films outside his obligation to the studio, he was not allowed to appear in them unless he was granted permission for each film. When forming 7 Pictures Corporation, the agreement between partners called for Hudson to appear in five films over seven years (hence the name of the corporation) for the company, regardless of his commitment with Universal-International Pictures. In May 1958, a month following Gates' filing for divorce, the company's agreement was amended for Hudson to only appear in two pictures for the company, though Ginsberg later objected to the modification of terms and sued the actor and other share-holders in April 1959, leading Hudson to form a new company, Gibraltar Productions.

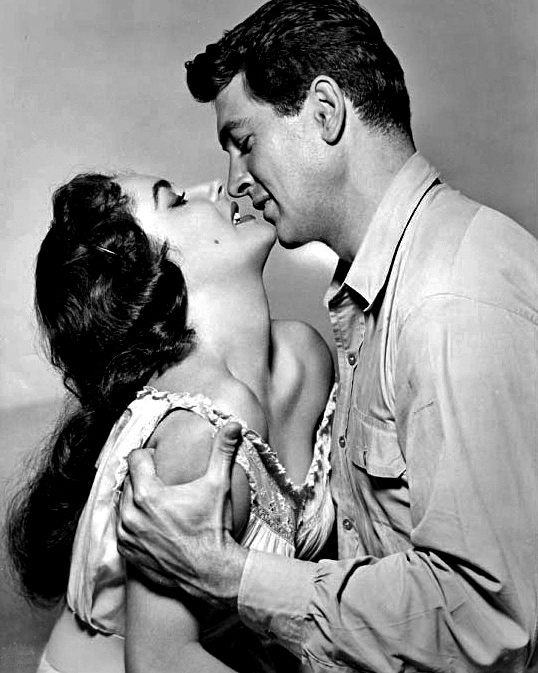
Hudson, pictured with Elizabeth Taylor in Giant (1956), the film that led to his only Academy Award nomination

He next acted in Never Say Goodbye (1956). Hudson's popularity soared with George Stevens' film Giant (1956). Hudson and his co-star James Dean were nominated for Oscars in the Best Actor category. Another hit was Written on the Wind (1956), directed by Sirk and produced by Albert Zugsmith. Sirk also directed Hudson in Battle Hymn (1957), produced by Hudson, playing Dean Hess. These films propelled Hudson to be voted the most popular actor in American cinemas in 1957. He stayed in the "top ten" until 1964.

Hudson was borrowed by MGM to appear in Richard Brooks' Something of Value (1957), a box-office disappointment. So too was his next film, a remake of A Farewell to Arms (1957). To make A Farewell to Arms, he reportedly turned down Marlon Brando's role in Sayonara, William Holden's role in The Bridge on the River Kwai, and Charlton Heston's role in Ben-Hur. A Farewell to Arms received negative reviews, failed at the box office and became the last production by David O. Selznick. Hudson was reunited with the producer, director and two stars of Written on the Wind in The Tarnished Angels (1958), at Universal. He then made Twilight for the Gods (1958) and This Earth Is Mine (1959).

=== Romantic comedy star and forming Gibraltar Productions ===
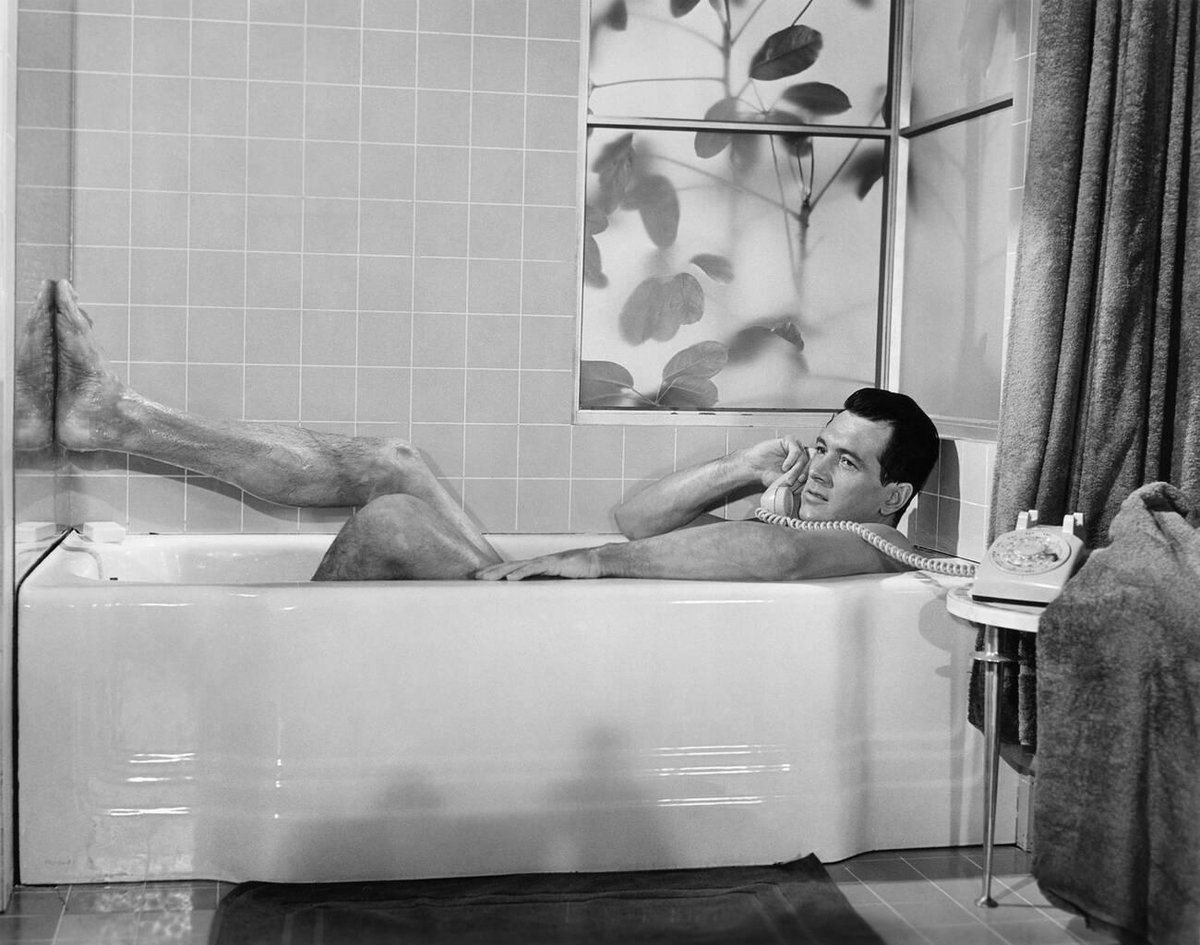
Hudson in Pillow Talk (1959)

Ross Hunter teamed Hudson with Doris Day in the romantic comedy Pillow Talk (1959), which was a massive hit. Hudson was voted the most popular star in the country for 1959 and was the second most popular for the next three years. Hudson told the press that he wanted to co-star in Let's Make Love with Marilyn Monroe but Universal-International Pictures denied him permission; the role went to Yves Montand.

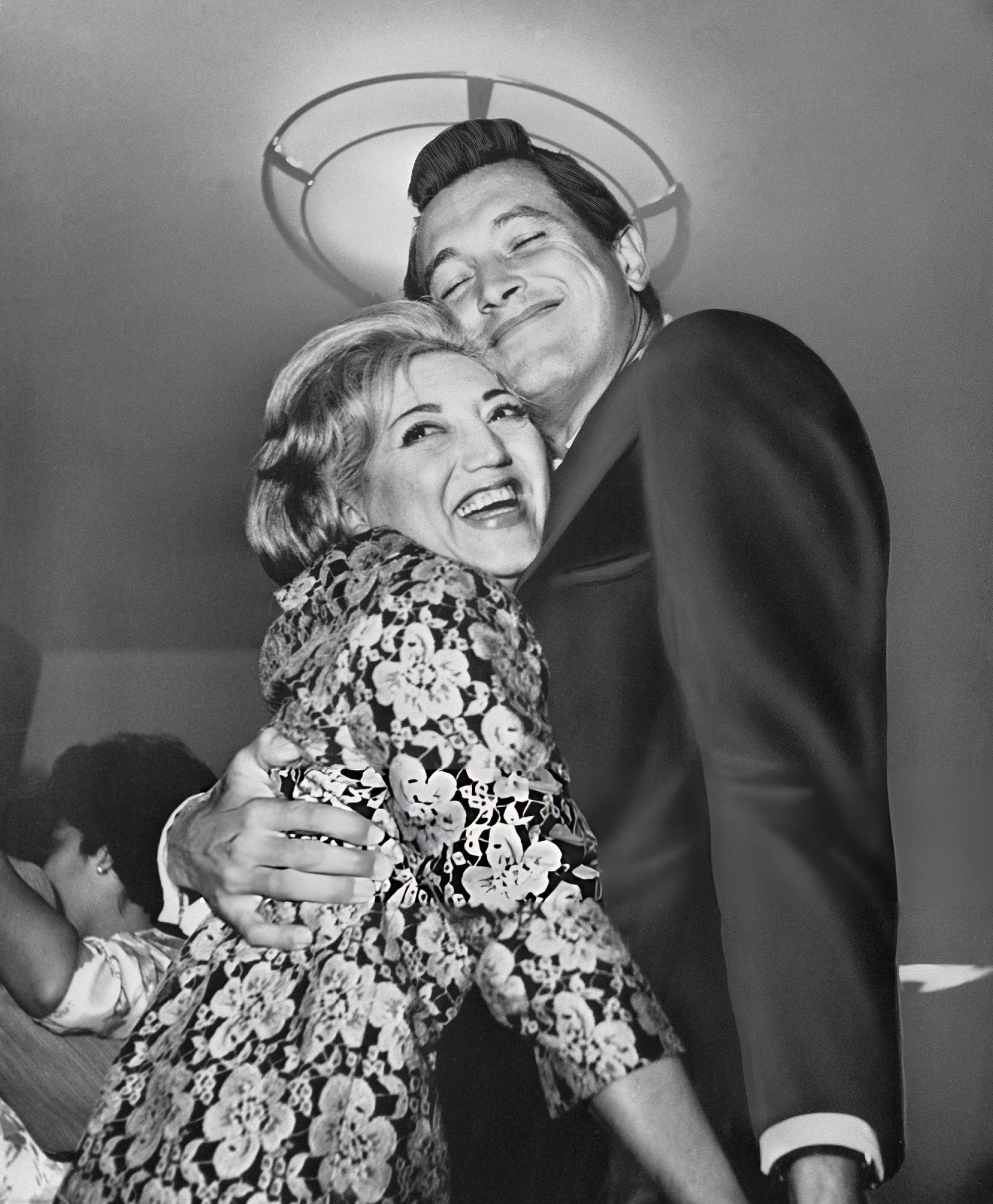
Hudson dancing with Mexican singer Amalia Mendoza in 1960. She was an artist that he personally admired

In late 1959, Hudson formed a new film production company, Gibraltar Productions. Now that his contract with Universal-International Pictures was about to end, he used his company to lease his acting services to Universal-International Pictures (and others), retaining a percentage of his film's profits, and with the added freedom to pick his own roles. The previously formed 7 Pictures Corporation was only briefly used because its assets were co-owned by Hudson's ex-wife Phyllis Gates; after the divorce, Hudson only produced through Gibraltar Productions, but Gates sued for a share in that company, too. Hudson later sold his assets of 7 Pictures Corporation to MCA, in exchange for stock in MCA/Universal-International Pictures.

After The Last Sunset (1961), co-starring Kirk Douglas and produced for Douglas' company Bryna Productions, Hudson made two comedies: Come September (1961) with Gina Lollobrigida, Sandra Dee and Bobby Darin, directed by Robert Mulligan; and Lover Come Back (1961) with Day; both films were produced through his 7 Pictures Corporation.

He made two dramas: The Spiral Road (1962), directed by Mulligan, and A Gathering of Eagles (1963), directed by Delbert Mann. Hudson was still voted the third most popular star in 1963. Hudson went back to comedy for Man's Favorite Sport? (1964), directed by Howard Hawks and co-produced through Gibraltar Productions, and Send Me No Flowers (1964), his third and final film with Day. Along with Cary Grant, Hudson was regarded as one of the best-dressed male stars in Hollywood and received Top 10 Stars of the Year a record-setting eight times from 1957 to 1964.

=== Decline as a star ===
Strange Bedfellows (1965), with Gina Lollobrigida, was a box-office disappointment. So too was A Very Special Favor (1965), despite having the same writer and director as Pillow Talk.

Hudson next appeared in Blindfold (1966). Then, working outside his usual range, he starred in the science-fiction thriller Seconds (1966), directed by John Frankenheimer and co-produced through his own film production company Gibraltar Productions.

He also tried his hand in the action genre with Tobruk (1967), directed by Arthur Hiller. After the comedy A Fine Pair (1968) with Claudia Cardinale, he starred in the action thriller Ice Station Zebra (1968) at MGM, a role which remained his personal favorite. The film was a hit but struggled to recoup its large cost.

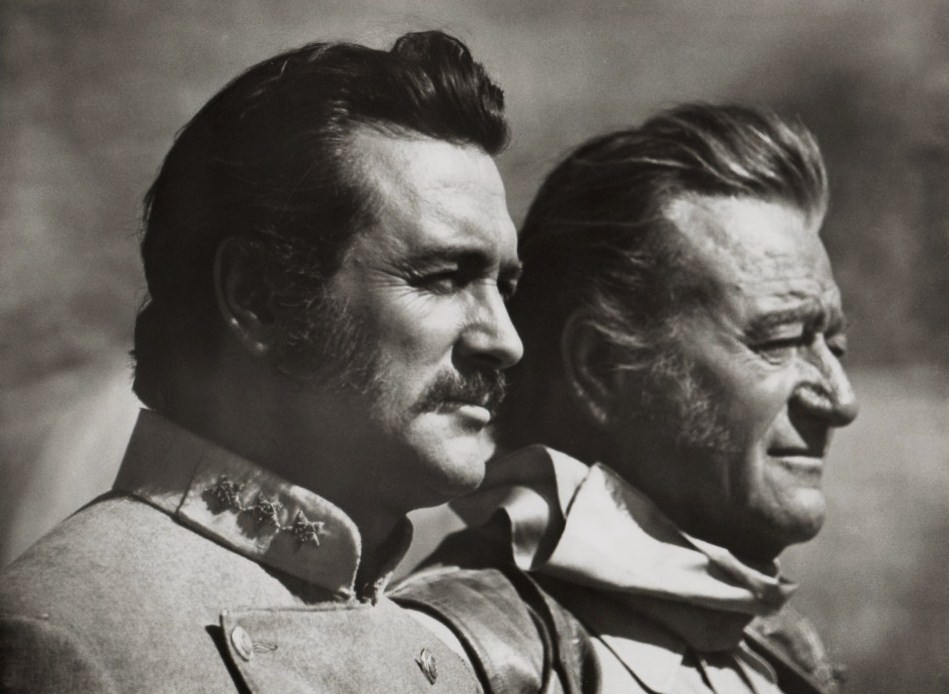
Hudson and John Wayne (right) in The Undefeated (1969)

In November 1969, Andrew V. McLaglen's The Undefeated, a western with Hudson starring opposite John Wayne, was released.

He co-starred as a World War I flier opposite Julie Andrews in the Blake Edwards musical Darling Lili (1970), a film notorious for its bloated budget. In 1971, he starred in another unsuccessful film, Roger Vadim's Pretty Maids All in a Row.

=== Television ===
During the 1970s and 1980s, he starred in a number of TV movies and series. His most successful television series was McMillan & Wife opposite Susan Saint James, which ran from 1971 to 1977. Hudson played police commissioner Stewart "Mac" McMillan, with Saint James as his wife Sally, and their on-screen chemistry helped make the show a hit.

During the series, Hudson appeared in Showdown (1973), a western with Dean Martin, and Embryo (1976), a science-fiction film. Hudson took a risk and surprised many by making a successful foray into live theater late in his career, and the best received of his efforts was I Do! I Do! in 1974.

After McMillan ended, Hudson made the disaster movie Avalanche (1978) and the miniseries Wheels (1978) and The Martian Chronicles (1980). He was one of several stars in The Mirror Crack'd (reuniting him with Giant co-star Elizabeth Taylor) (1980) and co-starred in The Beatrice Arthur Special (1980).

=== Later years ===
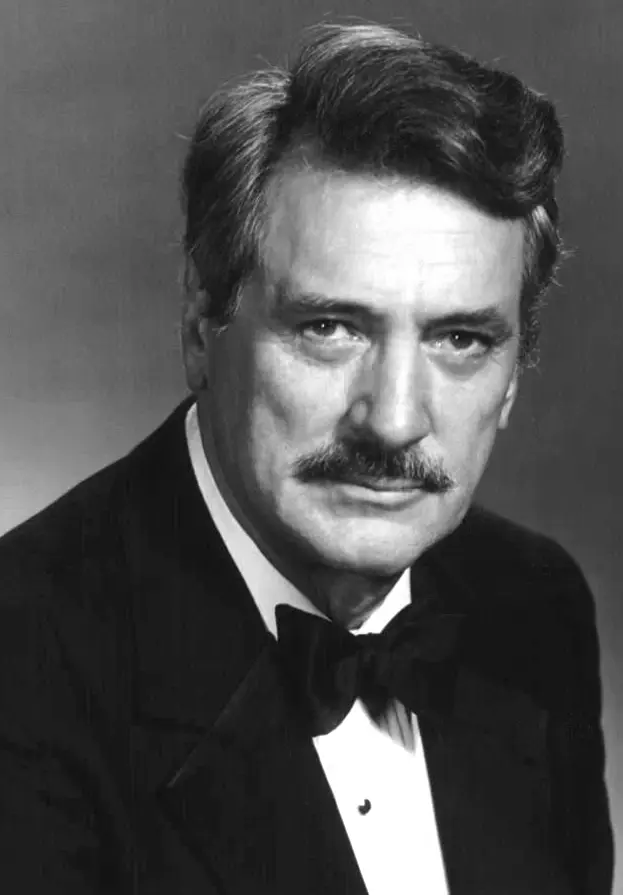
Hudson in 1982

In the early 1980s, following years of heavy drinking and smoking, Hudson developed health problems which resulted in an emergency heart surgery in November 1981. It was performed in order to prevent him from suffering a fatal myocardial infarction. Emergency quintuple heart bypass surgery sidelined Hudson and his new TV show The Devlin Connection for a year, and the show was canceled in December 1982 soon after it aired. His health problems forced him to turn down the role of Col. Sam Trautman in First Blood. Hudson was the first to narrate for Disney's Candlelight Processional at Magic Kingdom in Walt Disney World for its opening year in 1971. His final appearance as narrator was in 1984.

Hudson recovered from the heart surgery, but did not quit smoking. He continued to work, appearing in several TV movies such as World War III (1982). He was in ill health while filming the action-drama The Ambassador in Israel during the winter months from late 1983 to early 1984. He reportedly did not get along with his co-star Robert Mitchum, who had a serious drinking problem and often clashed off-camera with Hudson and other cast and crew members.

From December 1984 to April 1985, Hudson appeared in a recurring role on the prime time soap opera Dynasty as Daniel Reece, a wealthy horse breeder and a potential love interest for Krystle Carrington (played by Linda Evans), and biological father of the character Sammy Jo Carrington (Heather Locklear). While Hudson had long been known to have difficulty memorizing lines, resulting in his use of cue cards, his speech began to visibly deteriorate on Dynasty. He was scheduled to appear for the duration of the second half of its fifth season; however because of his progressing ill health, his character was abruptly written out of the show and died off-screen.

== Public image ==
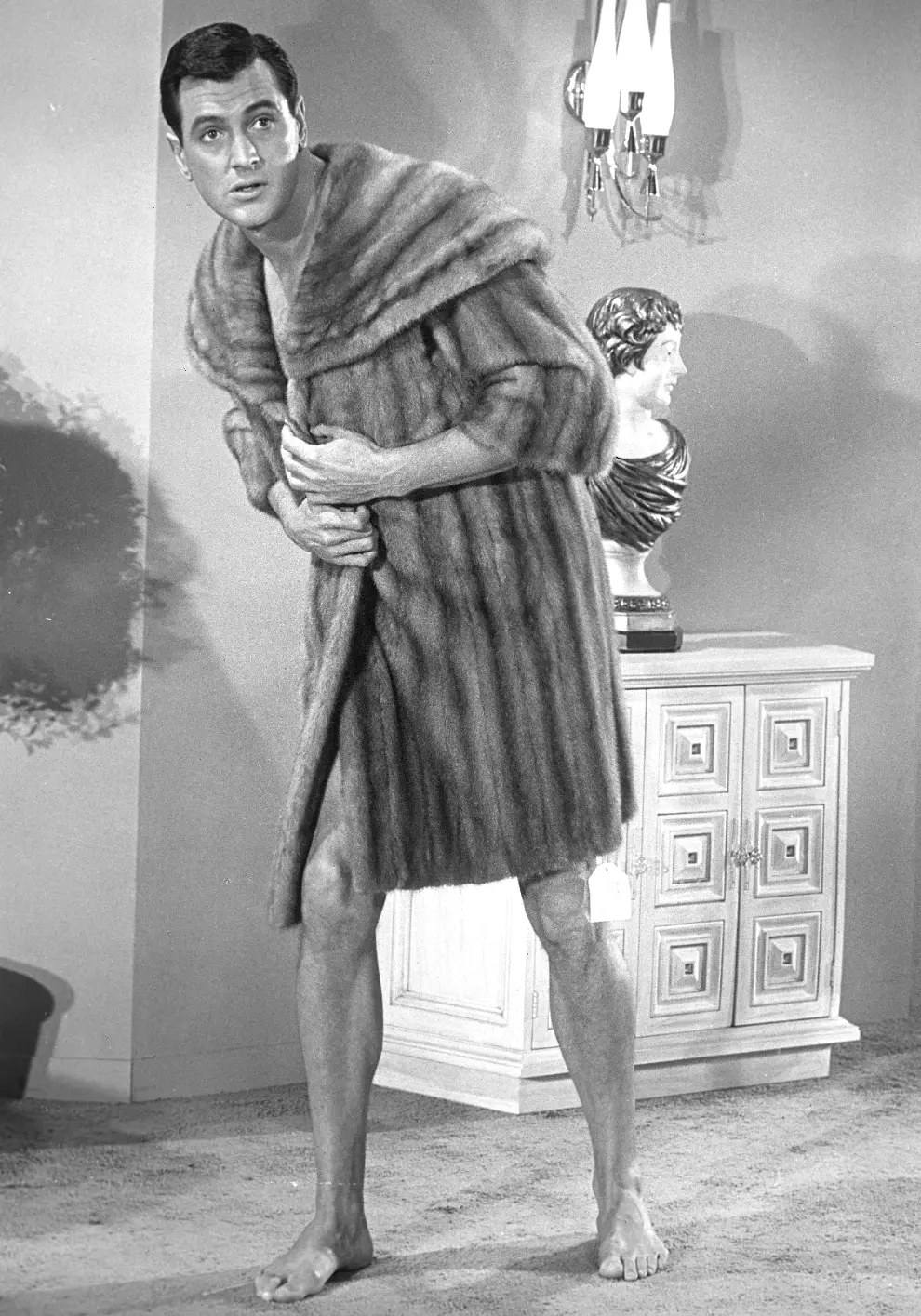
Hudson in Lover Come Back (1961)

Hudson became a celebrated sex symbol of Hollywood from the 1950s to the 1960s. His personality and looks defined traditional masculinity for millions of his spectators and followers.

== Personal life ==
While his career developed, Hudson and his agent, Henry Willson, kept the actor's personal life hidden from the public. In 1955, Confidential magazine threatened to publish an exposé about Hudson's secret homosexuality. Willson stalled this by disclosing information about two of his other clients: Rory Calhoun's years in prison, and the arrest of Tab Hunter at a party in 1950. According to some colleagues, Hudson's homosexual activity was well known in Hollywood throughout his career, and celebrity friends Julie Andrews, Mia Farrow, Elizabeth Taylor, Susan Saint James, Audrey Hepburn, and Carol Burnett said they had known about his homosexuality and kept it a secret for him.

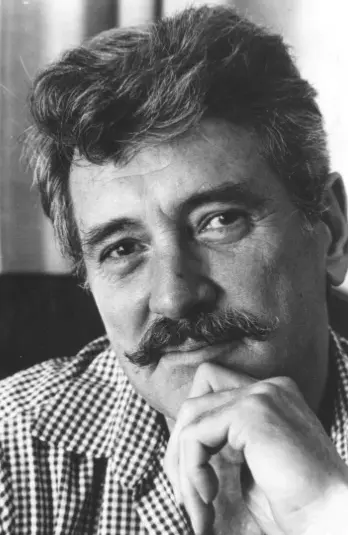
Hudson in 1981

Soon after the threat from Confidential, Hudson married Willson's secretary Phyllis Gates. Gates later wrote that she dated Hudson for several months, lived with him for two months before his unexpected marriage proposal, and married Hudson out of love and not (as it was reported later) to prevent an exposé of Hudson's sexual past. Press coverage of the wedding quoted Hudson as saying: "When I count my blessings, my marriage tops the list." Gates filed for divorce after three years in April 1958, citing mental cruelty (a standard practice at the time to bypass the mandatory wait for divorces to be approved). Hudson did not contest the divorce and Gates received alimony of $250 per week for 10 years. She also owned assets in Hudson's independent film production company, 7 Pictures Corporation, which was formed during their marriage, and later sued the actor to obtain shares in his new film production company, Gibraltar Productions, which he had formed after their divorce. She never remarried.

In 2005, Bob Hofler published a biography of Hudson's agent Henry Willson, titled The Man Who Invented Rock Hudson. He told The Village Voice that Phyllis Gates attempted to blackmail Hudson about his homosexual activities. The LGBTQ news magazine The Advocate published an article by Hofler, who claimed that Gates was actually a lesbian who believed from the beginning of their relationship that Hudson was gay.

According to the 1986 authorized biography Rock Hudson: His Story by Sara Davidson, Hudson was good friends with novelist Armistead Maupin, who states that the two had a brief fling. The book also names some of Hudson's lovers, including Jack Coates, Tom Clark (who published the memoir Rock Hudson: Friend of Mine), actor and stockbroker Lee Garlington, and Marc Christian (born Marc Christian MacGinnis), who later won a suit against the Hudson estate.

An urban legend circulated in the early 1970s that Hudson had "married" actor Jim Nabors, who was also secretly gay, and the subject of rumors to that effect. Hudson and Nabors were nothing more than friends. Hudson attributed the rumors to a joke by a gay couple who sent out gag invitations to their annual gathering, advertising a wedding in which Hudson would take the name of Nabors's character Gomer Pyle and become "Rock Pyle." The October 1972 issue of MAD magazine (no. 154) included a parody of a gossip columnist publicizing an obscure rumor by denying it, saying "And there isn't a grain of truth to the vicious rumor that movie and TV star Rock Heman and singer Jim Nelly were secretly married!" Over the years, the rumor persisted and continued to spread. As a result, Hudson and Nabors never spoke to each other again. Hudson, after briefly pursuing legal action, mostly brushed off the rumors and said "some people are going to believe whatever they want to believe". Nabors was deeply hurt by the rumors, considering them to be "horrible."

Although he was raised Catholic, Hudson later identified as an atheist. A week before Hudson died, his publicist Tom Clark asked a priest to visit. Hudson made a deathbed confession, received communion, and was administered the last rites. Hudson also was visited by Shirley and Pat Boone.

Politically, Hudson was a conservative Republican; he campaigned and voted for Barry Goldwater in the 1964 United States presidential election.

== Illness and death ==
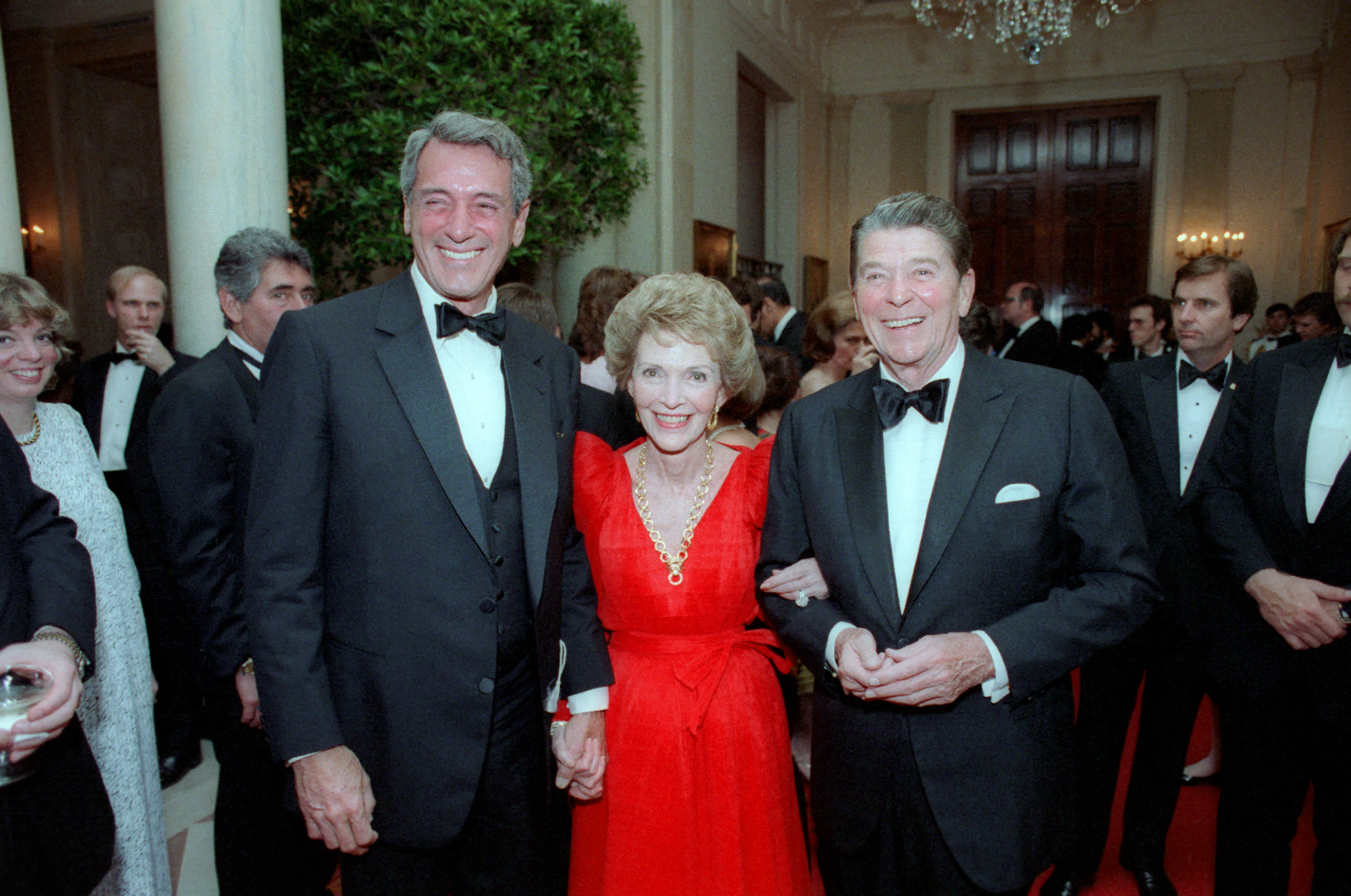
Hudson (left) with U.S. President Ronald Reagan and First Lady Nancy Reagan at a May 1984 White House state dinner, less than three weeks before he was diagnosed with AIDS.

Unknown to the public, Hudson was diagnosed with AIDS on June 5, 1984, three years after the emergence of the first cluster of symptomatic patients in the United States, and a year after the initial conclusion by scientists that HIV causes AIDS. Over the next several months, Hudson kept his illness a secret and continued to work, while at the same time traveling to France and other countries seeking a cure or treatment to slow the progression of the disease. During a visit to London in 1984, he gave a rare solo television interview; appearing gaunt on BBC's Wogan talk show, he reviewed his career, declaring that fate had played a huge part in his success.

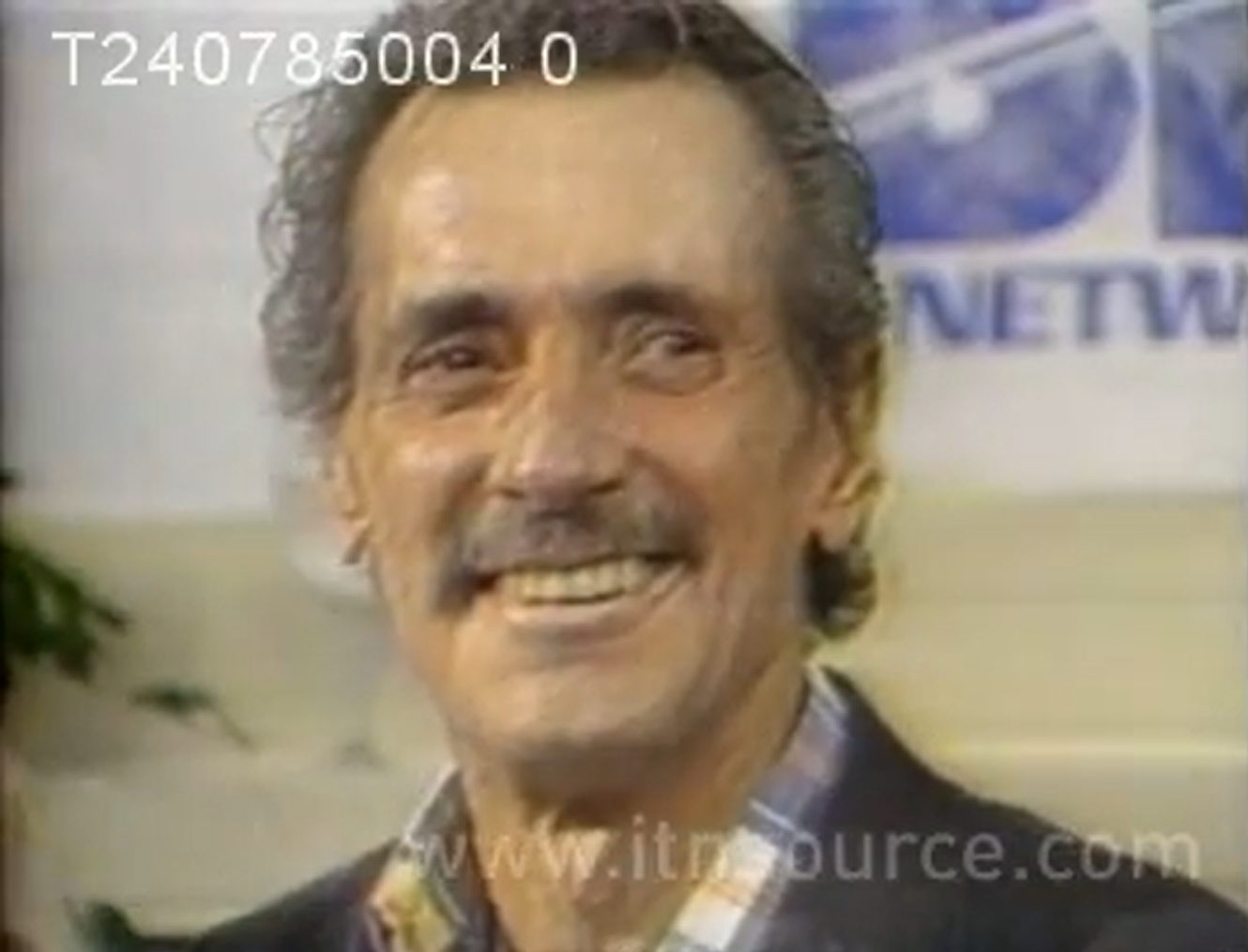
Hudson in July 1985. Emaciated and sickly, his appearance triggered alarm.

On July 16, 1985, Hudson joined Doris Day for a Hollywood press conference, announcing the launch of her new cable TV show Doris Day's Best Friends, for which he was the inaugural guest. His emaciated appearance was such a shock that clips of the reunion were broadcast repeatedly over national news shows that night and for days to come, with media outlets speculating on Hudson's health. Later, Day acknowledged that Hudson "was very sick. But I just brushed that off and I came out and put my arms around him and said 'Am I glad to see you.'"

Two days later, Hudson traveled to Paris for another round of treatment. After he collapsed in his room at the Ritz Hotel in Paris on July 21, his publicist Dale Olson released a statement claiming that Hudson had inoperable liver cancer. Olson denied reports that Hudson had AIDS and said only that he was undergoing tests for "everything" at the American Hospital of Paris.

In Paris, Hudson was denied access to the Hôpital d'instruction des armées Percy, where he was hoping to receive experimental treatment, on the grounds that he was not a French citizen. On July 24, Olson sent a telegram to the Reagans, with whom Hudson had been friendly, to ask for their intervention. They were hoping that “a request from the White House or a high American official would change [the head of the hospital’s] mind”. On the same day, a White House staffer responded that "Mrs. Reagan [...] did not feel this was something the White House should get into" and advised them to contact the U.S. Embassy in Paris instead. Hudson was later admitted to the hospital thanks to an intervention from French defence minister Charles Hernu.

On July 25, Hudson's French publicist Yanou Collart confirmed that Hudson had AIDS. He was among the earliest mainstream celebrities whose diagnosis was reported to the public.

Hudson flew back to Los Angeles on July 30, chartering a plane because airlines refused to transport a patient with AIDS. He was so weak that he was moved by stretcher from the Air France Boeing 747 he had chartered; he and his medical attendants were the only passengers. He was flown by helicopter to UCLA Medical Center, where he spent nearly a month undergoing further treatment. He was released from the hospital in late August 1985 and returned to his home in Beverly Hills, Los Angeles, for private hospice care.

At around 9 a.m. on October 2, 1985, Hudson died in his sleep from AIDS-related complications at his home in Beverly Hills at the age of 59. Hudson requested that no funeral be held. His body was cremated hours after his death and a cenotaph later was established at Forest Lawn Cemetery in Cathedral City, California. His ashes were scattered in the channel between Wilmington, Los Angeles and Santa Catalina Island.

The disclosure of Hudson's AIDS diagnosis provoked widespread public discussion of his homosexuality. In Logical Family: A Memoir (2017), gay author Armistead Maupin, who was a friend of Hudson, writes that he was the first person to confirm to the press that Hudson was gay in 1985. Maupin explains that he confirmed it to Randy Shilts of the San Francisco Chronicle and that he was annoyed that producer Ross Hunter, also gay, denied it. In its August 15, 1985, issue, People magazine published a story that discussed his disease in the context of his sexuality. The largely sympathetic article featured comments from show business colleagues, such as Angie Dickinson, Robert Stack, and Gregory Peck, who claimed they knew about Hudson's homosexuality and expressed their support for him. At that time, People had a circulation of more than 2.8 million; as a result of this and other stories, Hudson's homosexuality became public. Hudson's revelation had an immediate impact on the visibility of AIDS and on the funding of medical research related to the disease.

Shortly after Hudson's press release disclosing his infection, William M. Hoffman, the author of As Is, a play about AIDS that appeared on Broadway in 1985, stated: "If Rock Hudson can have it, nice people can have it. It's just a disease, not a moral affliction." At the same time, Joan Rivers was quoted as saying: "Two years ago, when I hosted a benefit for AIDS, I couldn't get one major star to turn out. Rock's admission is a horrendous way to bring AIDS to the attention of the American public, but by doing so, Rock, in his life, has helped millions in the process. What Rock has done takes true courage." Morgan Fairchild said that "Rock Hudson's death gave AIDS a face." In a telegram that Hudson sent to a September 1985 Hollywood AIDS benefit, Commitment to Life, which he was too ill to attend, Hudson said: "I am not happy that I am sick. I am not happy that I have AIDS. But if that is helping others, I can at least know that my own misfortune has had some positive worth."

Shortly after his death, People reported: "Since Hudson made his announcement, more than $1.8 million in private contributions (more than double the amount collected in 1984) has been raised to support AIDS research and to care for AIDS victims (5,523 reported in 1985 alone). A few days after Hudson died, Congress set aside $221 million to develop a cure for AIDS." Organizers of the Hollywood AIDS benefit Commitment to Life reported that it was necessary to move the event to a larger venue to accommodate the increased attendance following Hudson's announcement that he was suffering from the disease. Shortly before his death, Hudson made the first direct contribution, $250,000, to amfAR, The Foundation for AIDS Research, helping launch the non-profit organization dedicated to AIDS/HIV research and prevention; it was formed by the merger of a Los Angeles organization founded by: Michael S. Gottlieb, Hudson's physician, his friend and co-star in two films Elizabeth Taylor, and a New York-based group.

However, Hudson's revelation did not immediately dispel the stigma of AIDS. Although then-President Ronald Reagan and his wife Nancy were friends of Hudson, Reagan made no public statement concerning Hudson's condition. Reagan to that point had not publicly acknowledged AIDS, and did not until two months later in September 1985. However, Reagan did telephone Hudson privately in his Paris hospital room where he was being treated in July 1985 and released a condolence statement after his death.

After Hudson revealed his diagnosis, a controversy arose concerning his participation in a scene in the television drama Dynasty, in which he shared a long and repeated kiss with actress Linda Evans in one episode (first aired in February 1985). When filming the scene, Hudson was aware that he had AIDS but did not inform Evans. Some felt that he should have disclosed his condition to her beforehand. At the time, it was incorrectly thought that the virus was present in low quantities in saliva and tears, but there had been no reported cases of transmission by kissing. Nevertheless, the Centers for Disease Control and Prevention had warned against exchanging saliva with members of groups perceived to be at high risk for AIDS.

According to comments given in August 1985 by Ed Asner, then-president of the Screen Actors Guild, Hudson's revelation caused incipient "panic" within the film and television industry. Asner said that he was aware of scripts being rewritten to eliminate kissing scenes. Later in the same year, the Guild issued rules requiring that actors be notified in advance of any "open-mouth" kissing scenes with a provision that they could refuse to participate in such scenes without penalty. Linda Evans appears not to have been angry at Hudson, and asked to introduce the segment of the 1985 Commitment to Life benefit that was dedicated to Hudson. She later stated that she had been puzzled at the time by Hudson's dispassionate performance in the kissing scene, and attributed it to an abundance of caution.

== Legacy ==
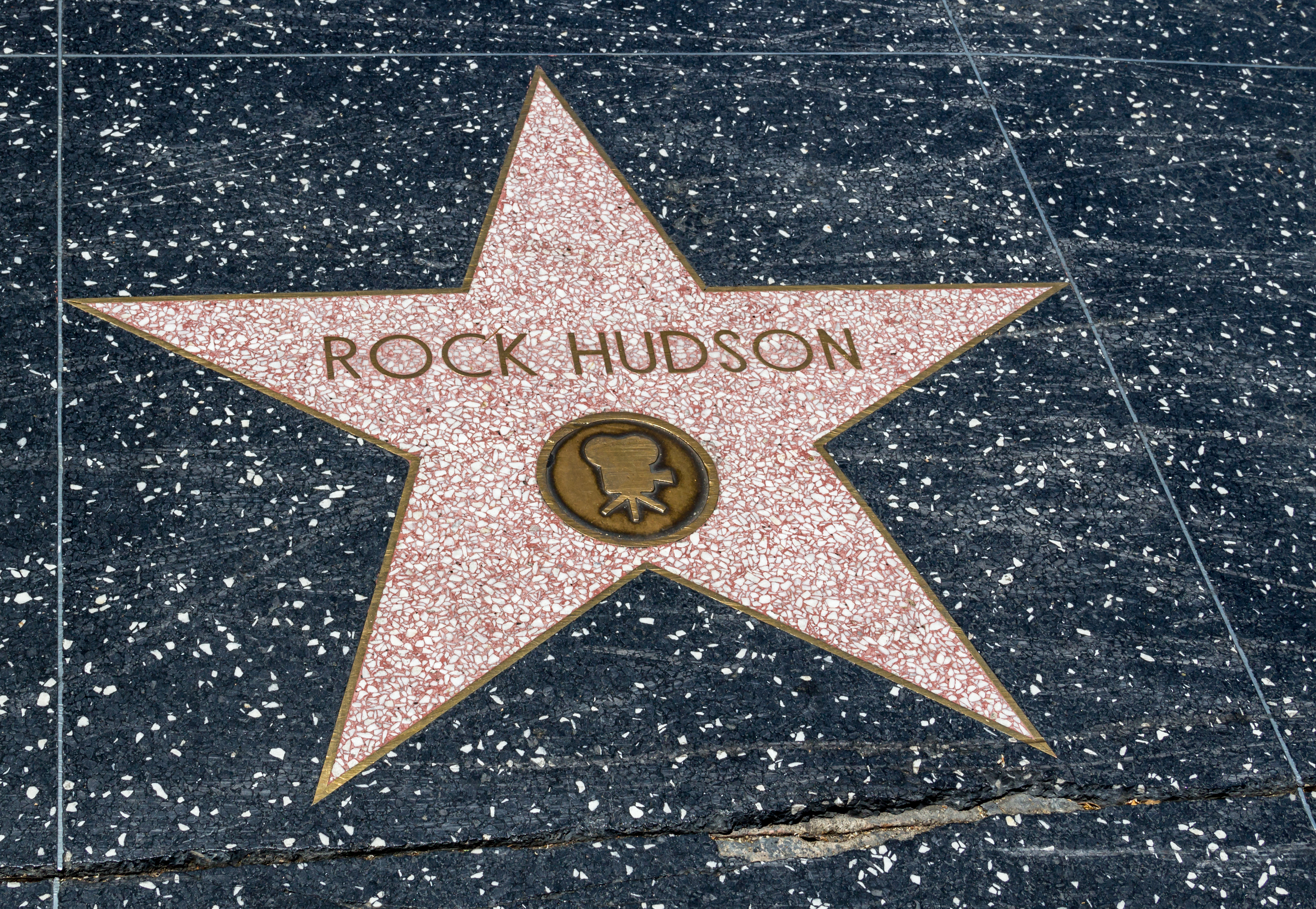
Hudson's star at on the Hollywood Walk of Fame at 6116 Hollywood Blvd.

For his contribution to the motion picture industry, Hudson was given a star on the Hollywood Walk of Fame (located at 6116 Hollywood Blvd). Following his death, Elizabeth Taylor, his co-star in the film Giant, purchased a bronze plaque for Hudson on the West Hollywood Memorial Walk. In 2002, a Golden Palm Star on the Palm Springs Walk of Stars was dedicated to him.

== Lawsuits ==
Following Hudson's death, Marc Christian, Hudson's former lover, sued his estate on grounds of "intentional infliction of emotional distress". Christian claimed that Hudson continued having sex with him until February 1985, more than eight months after Hudson knew that he had HIV. Although he repeatedly tested negative for HIV, Christian claimed that he suffered from "severe emotional distress" after learning from a July 25, 1985, newscast that Hudson had been diagnosed with AIDS. Christian also sued Hudson's personal secretary Mark Miller for $10 million because Miller allegedly lied to him about Hudson's illness. In 1989, a jury awarded Christian $21.75 million in damages, later reduced to $5.5 million. Later, Christian defended Hudson's reputation in not telling him he was infected: "You can't dismiss a man's whole life with a single act. This thing about AIDS was totally out of character for him", he stated in an interview.

In 1990, Hudson's live-in publicist, Tom Clark, and publicist Dick Kleiner published Rock Hudson, Friend of Mine. In the book, Clark said he believed Hudson acquired HIV from blood transfusions during quintuple bypass open-heart surgery in 1981, never acknowledging that their relationship went beyond being roommates, and characterized Christian as disreputable. Christian filed a $22 million libel suit against the authors and publisher, charging that he had been labelled "a criminal, a thief, an unclean person, a blackmailer, a psychotic, an extortionist, a forger, a perjurer, a liar, a whore, an arsonist and a squatter".

In 2010, Robert Park Mills, the attorney who represented the Hudson estate against Christian in court, released a book titled Between Rock and a Hard Place: In Defense of Rock Hudson. In the book, Mills discusses details of the trial and also questions Christian's allegations against Hudson.

== Awards ==
| Year | Award | Category | Work | Ref. |
|---|---|---|---|---|
| 1956 | Photoplay Awards | Most Popular Male Star | Himself | |
| 1957 | Photoplay Awards | Most Popular Male Star | Himself | |
| 1958 | Laurel Awards | Top Male Star | Himself | |
| 1959 | Bambi Awards | Best Actor – International | This Earth Is Mine | |
| 1959 | Golden Globe Award | World Film Favorite – Male | Himself | |
| 1959 | Laurel Awards | Top Male Star | Himself | |
| 1959 | Photoplay Awards | Most Popular Male Star | Himself | |
| 1960 | Bambi Awards | Best Actor – International | Pillow Talk | |
| 1960 | Golden Globe Award | World Film Favorite – Male | Himself | |
| 1960 | Laurel Awards | Top Male Star | Himself | |
| 1961 | Bambi Awards | Best Actor – International | Come September | |
| 1961 | Golden Globe Award | World Film Favorite – Male | Himself | |
| 1962 | Bambi Awards | Best Actor – International | The Spiral Road | |
| 1963 | Golden Globe Award | World Film Favorite – Male | Himself | |
| 1963 | Laurel Awards | Top Male Star | Himself | |
| 1964 | Bambi Awards | Best Actor – International | Man's Favorite Sport? | |
| 1967 | Bambi Awards | Best Actor – International | Seconds | |
| 1976 | TP de Oro | Best Foreign Actor (Mejor Actor Extranjero) | McMillan & Wife | |

== In media ==
Hudson was parodied as actor Rock Quarry in The Flintstones episode "The Rock Quarry Story" (1961).

The story of Hudson's marriage was depicted in the 1990 TV film Rock Hudson, starring Daphne Ashbrook as Gates and Thomas Ian Griffith as Hudson.

Mark Rappaport made the documentary Rock Hudson's Home Movies in 1992.

Hudson has been the subject of three plays: Rock (2008), starring Michael Xavier as Hudson, For Roy (2010), starring Richard Henzel as Hudson, and Hollywood Valhalla (2011), starring Patrick Joseph Byrnes as Hudson.

Hudson is portrayed by Jake Picking in the 2020 miniseries Hollywood, a revisionist tale of post-World War II Hollywood.

The tenth song on Kelly Clarkson's 2023 album Chemistry is called "Rock Hudson".

== See also ==
- Rock Hudson's Home Movies
- Rock Hudson: All That Heaven Allowed
- Ronald Reagan and AIDS § Death of Rock Hudson

== Bibliography ==
- Clark, Tom; Kleiner, Richard (1990). Rock Hudson, Friend of Mine. New York: Pharos Books. ISBN 0-88687-562-5.
- Gates, Phyllis; Thomas, Bob (1987). My Husband, Rock Hudson. Garden City, NJ: Doubleday. ISBN 0-385-24071-6.
- Griffin, Mark (2018). All That Heaven Allows: A Biography of Rock Hudson. HarperCollins. ISBN 978-0062408853.
  - "Reviewed by Steve Nathans-Kelly in New York Journal of Books". December 4, 2018. Archived from the original on August 6, 2020.
- Hudson, Rock; Davidson, Sara (1986). Rock Hudson: His Story. New York: Morrow. ISBN 0-688-06472-8.
- Ragland, Shannon P. (2007). The Thin Thirty. Louisville, KY: Set Shot Press. ISBN 978-0-9791222-1-7.
- Wise, James (1997). Stars in Blue: Movie Actors in America's Sea Services. Annapolis, MD: Naval Institute Press. ISBN 978-1591149446. LCCN 2007015851. OCLC 36824724. Archived from the original on June 30, 2024.
