= Henry Willson =

American talent agent (1911–1978)

- Born: Henry Leroy Willson; July 31, 1911; Lansdowne, Pennsylvania, U.S.
- Died: November 2, 1978 (aged 67); Woodland Hills, Los Angeles, California, U.S.
- Education: Wesleyan University
- Occupation: Talent agent
- Known for: Popularizing the beefcake craze of the 1950s

Henry Leroy Willson (July 31, 1911 – November 2, 1978) was an American Hollywood talent agent who played a large role in developing the beefcake craze of the 1950s.

His clients included Rock Hudson, Tab Hunter, Chad Everett, Robert Wagner, Nick Adams, Guy Madison, Kerwin Mathews, Troy Donahue, Mike Connors, Rory Calhoun, John Saxon, Yale Summers, Clint Walker, Doug McClure, Dack Rambo, Ty Hardin, and John Derek.

== Early life ==
Willson was born into a prominent show business family in Lansdowne, Pennsylvania. His father, Horace, was the vice-president of the Columbia Phonograph Company and advanced to the presidency in 1922. Willson came in close contact with many Broadway theatre, opera, and vaudeville performers. Will Rogers, Fanny Brice, and Fred Stone numbered among the family's friends, after they moved to Forest Hills, an upscale neighborhood in the New York City borough of Queens.

Concerned about his son's interest in tap dance, the elder Willson enrolled Henry in the Asheville School in North Carolina, where he hoped the school's many team sports and rugged weekend activities, such as rock climbing and backpacking, would have a positive influence on the boy. He later attended Wesleyan University in Middletown, Connecticut, spending weekends in Manhattan, where he wrote weekly gossip columns for Variety.

== Hollywood years ==
In 1933, Willson traveled to Hollywood by steamship via the Panama Canal. On board he cultivated a friendship with Bing Crosby's wife, Dixie Lee, who introduced him to the Hollywood elite and secured him a job with Photoplay, where his first article was about the newborn Gary Crosby. He began writing for The Hollywood Reporter and the New Movie Magazine, became a junior agent at the Joyce & Polimer Agency, moved into a Beverly Hills home purchased by his father, and became a regular at Sunset Strip gay bars, where he wooed young men for both professional and personal reasons. One of his first clients was Junior Durkin, whose career was cut short when he died in an automobile accident on May 4, 1935.

Willson joined the Zeppo Marx Agency, where he represented newcomers Marjorie Belcher, Jon Hall, and William T. Orr. He was introduced to Julia Turner, a Hollywood High School student, in 1937, whom he renamed "Lana Turner" and got cast in small roles, finally introducing her to Mervyn LeRoy at Warner Bros. In 1943, David O. Selznick hired Willson to head the talent division of his newly formed Vanguard Pictures. The first film he cast was the World War II drama Since You Went Away (1944) with Claudette Colbert, Jennifer Jones, and Shirley Temple. He placed Guy Madison, Craig Stevens, and John Derek (billed as Dare Harris) in small supporting roles.

Willson eventually opened his own talent agency, where he nurtured the careers of his young finds, frequently coercing them into sexual relationships in exchange for publicity and film roles. In his book, Screened Out: Playing Gay in Hollywood from Edison to Stonewall, Richard Barrios writes, "talent agent Henry Willson... had a singular knack for discovering and renaming young actors whose visual appeal transcended any lack of ability." Under his tutelage, Robert Mosely became Guy Madison, Orison Whipple Hungerford Jr. was renamed Ty Hardin, Arthur Gelien was changed to Tab Hunter, and Roy Scherer turned into Rock Hudson. So successful was the beefcake aspect of this enterprise, and so widely recognized was Willson's sexuality, that it was often, and often inaccurately, assumed that all of his clients were gay. In her book Natasha: The Biography of Natalie Wood, Suzanne Finstad confirms that "some of the would-be actors Willson represented were heterosexual, but a disproportionate number were homosexual, bisexual, or 'co-operated' with Willson 'to get gigs,' in the observation of Natalie [Wood]'s costar Bobby Hyatt. ..." "if a young, handsome actor had Henry Willson for an agent, 'it was almost assumed he was gay, like it was written across his forehead,' recalls Ann Doran, one of Willson's few female clients."

His most prominent client was Rock Hudson, whom he transformed from a clumsy, naive, Chicago-born truck driver named Roy Scherer into one of Hollywood's most popular leading men. The two were teamed professionally until 1966. In 1955, Confidential magazine threatened to publish an exposé about Hudson's secret gay life, and Willson disclosed information about Rory Calhoun's years in prison and Tab Hunter's arrest at a gay party in 1950 in exchange for the tabloid not printing the Hudson story. At his agent's urging, Hudson married Willson's secretary Phyllis Gates in order to put the rumors to rest and maintain a macho image, but the union dissolved after three years.

In 2017, actor Tony Tarantino claimed in an interview that, in 1960, when he was 20 years old, Willson offered him acting opportunities and a "lavish lifestyle" in exchange for sex. Tarantino, best known as the father of Quentin Tarantino, said that he refused and punched Willson in the face, leading to his firing from the western television series Dick Powell's Zane Grey Theatre and adoption of a new stage name.

== Later years and death ==
In his later years, Willson struggled with drug addiction, alcoholism, paranoia, and weight problems. As his own homosexuality had become public knowledge, many of his clients, both gay and straight, distanced themselves from him for fear of being branded the same.

In 1978, the unemployed and destitute agent moved into the Motion Picture & Television Country House and Hospital until his death from cirrhosis of the liver. He was 67 years old.

With no money to cover the cost of a gravestone, he was interred in an unmarked grave in Valhalla Memorial Park Cemetery in North Hollywood, California. A headstone was eventually placed at his burial site with the epitaph "Star - Star Maker".

== In popular culture ==
Andrew Robinson played Henry Willson in the 1990 TV movie Rock Hudson starring Thomas Ian Griffith as Hudson.

Willson is portrayed by Jim Parsons in the 2020 Netflix miniseries Hollywood, a counterfactual re-imagining of post World War II Hollywood.
