= Yanou Collart =

French publicist (born 1938)

- Born: 15 September 1938 (age 88); Brussels, Belgium
- Education: Université libre de Bruxelles
- Occupations: Publicist, activist

Yanou Collart (French pronunciation: [janu kɔlaɾ]; born 15 September 1938) is a Belgian-born French publicist, actor and activist, noted for her connections in French culinary society and work with foreign celebrities such as Paul McCartney, Jack Nicholson and Kirk Douglas. Collart has been identified as one of the most prominent publicists in the world.

== Early life ==
Yanou Collart was born in Brussels in 1938 to Émile Collart and his wife. (Note: Collart's mother is not named in her autobiography.) Collart had two younger brothers, Renè and Robert. Growing up in Uccle, Collart's father was physically abusive to her and her mother. Collart played the accordion in her childhood until she was molested by her music teacher. When Collart told her parents what had happened, her father refused to believe her and forced her to quit the instrument as punishment, though Collart notes in her autobiography that she had always hated playing the accordion and was happy to stop. Her father's abuse motivated Collart to leave home and seek independence elsewhere, determined to "never be dependent on a man". (Note: French: "M'ont décidée à partir et à vivre sans jamais dépendre d'un homme.") Collart's parents separated in 1955, and when her father died by suicide in 1957, she refused to attend the funeral. Collart attended the Université libre de Bruxelles, graduating in 1955 with a degree in Greco-Roman studies.

== Career ==
Following her father's death in 1957, Collart worked a variety of jobs in Brussels including for Admiral, real estate company Caarven, and a boutique store, where her performance motivated her boss to take her to Paris. With the boutique, she was eventually given a role which required her to travel often between Brussels and Paris, and later a job in Bouches-du-Rhône. Eventually relocating fully to Paris, Collart's multilingualism was highly sought after, and she found work across several French companies including Bic.

Collart's multilingualism and ability to create connections eventually made her a sought-after facilitator in Paris. In 1969, Collart came into contact with John Lennon and Yoko Ono when EMI Records gave her responsibility for distributing Lennon and Ono's WAR IS OVER! If You Want It posters in France. Collart would continue working with Lennon and Ono, including producing Ono's bed-in exhibition in Paris. In the following years, Collart would work as a publicist for many other notable foreign celebrities visiting France or Europe, including Lennon's former bandmate Paul McCartney, Kirk Douglas, Jerry Lewis and Jack Nicholson.

Collart has been noted for her involvement in the French culinary industry as a publicist and has been credited for helping launch the careers of several prominent French chefs, including Paul Bocuse and Roger Vergé. Her process for raising the profile of chefs involved finding promising restaurants, and then flying their chefs to the United States to work with American celebrities.

In 1987, Collart launched an exclusive "club" which gave its members access to her services—such as procuring bookings, promoting actors' films in Europe, and gaining access to private art collections—for a fee of $2,000 per year (equivalent to $5,668 per year in 2025). Collart stated that she had to deny most applicants, and that her goal with the club was to make more friends rather than money.

=== Government connections ===
Collart maintained connections in the French government, which she used at various points to benefit her clientele. In 1989, she helped to organize a summit between US President George H. W. Bush and French president François Mitterrand in Saint Martin.

=== Rock Hudson's publicist ===
Collart was a close friend of American actor Rock Hudson, as well as being his publicist. After Hudson was diagnosed with AIDS in 1984, he flew to Paris to seek AIDS treatment from Dr. Dominique Dormant, who treated him with HPA-23 in late 1984. Hudson's diagnosis was not public, as there was much stigma against it at the time and Hudson was not out to the public as gay. As such, his official reason for being in France was that he was there for a film festival. Collart helped him cover up his ailment, and on 21 July 1985, after Hudson suffered a public fall at the Hôtel Ritz Paris and was subsequently hospitalized, she helped him put out a cover story that the cause of his illness was liver cancer.

Hudson was hospitalized at the American Hospital of Paris, however, Dormant worked at a Parisian military hospital. Hudson was denied entry to the military hospital as he was not a French citizen, and Dormant was also unable to enter the American Hospital to treat him. Hudson sent a telegram to Nancy Reagan, his friend and first lady of the United States, asking her to use her influence to get the French government to let him into the military hospital, which he believed would give him the best chance at recovery, while at the same time Collart worked with her government connections to get Dormant into the American Hospital. Although Reagan denied his request, Collart was able to get Dormant entry into the American Hospital to see Hudson.

Finally, on 25 July 1985, at Hudson's request, Collart announced to the press that Hudson did in fact have AIDS, though she still did not disclose his homosexuality, stating instead that "he doesn't have any idea of how he contracted AIDS, nobody around him has AIDS". After being allowed into the American Hospital, Dormant determined that Hudson's infection had progressed too far for further treatment to be effective, (Note: The first treatment for AIDS, AZT, would not be available until 1987.) and Hudson decided to stop seeking treatment and return to Los Angeles from Paris on 28 July 1985.

=== Reputation ===
In 1988, American statesman Pierre Salinger was quoted as calling Collart "the best connected person in France and perhaps all of Europe." Collart has been noted as one of the top publicists in Europe, and one of the most recognized publicists worldwide. Food critic Ruth Reichl called Collart "the last of the great French courtesans," but for "food and friendship instead of sex".

== Activism ==
In 2021, Collart was honored for raising more than $2 million for the charity Meals on Wheels. Starting in the 1970s, Collart would fly French chefs she was connected with to New York City and auction their services to benefit Meals on Wheels, and use her celebrity connections to ensure the events were well-attended. Collart has also been honored by PETA for her animal activism.

== Personal life ==
Collart has never married, though in her 2019 autobiography she wrote extensively of her romantic and sexual relationship with the Italian actor Lino Ventura. According to Collart, their relationship lasted from 1972 until 1982; Ventura was married the entire time they were together.

== Works ==
=== Filmography ===
| Year | Title | Role |
|---|---|---|
| 1979 | Je te tiens, tu me tiens par la barbichette (I Hold You, You Hold Me by the Goatee) | Lucienne Fouché-Blanchot |
| 1984 | American Dreamer | Marguerite Lasueur |
| 1985 | Liberté, égalité, choucroute (Liberty, Equality, Sauerkraut) | |

=== Writing ===
- The Stars of My Life (French: Les Étoiles De Ma Vie). L'Archipel, 2019.

== Works cited ==
=== Books ===
- Collart, Yanou (19 June 2019). Les Étoiles De Ma Vie [The Stars of My Life] (in French). L'Archipel. ISBN 9782809826760.

=== Web ===
- Reichl, Ruth (27 July 1986). "You've Got a Friend in Yanou". Los Angeles Times.
- Mikelbank, Peter (10 July 1988). "Europe's 'In'-Crowd Hangout". Los Angeles Times.
- Adelaide, Victoria (23 October 2017). "Yanou Collart". Beautiful Humans.
- Geidner, Chris (2 February 2015). "Nancy Reagan Turned Down Rock Hudson's Plea For Help Nine Weeks Before He Died". BuzzFeed News.
- Lecocq, Jean-Jacques (9 July 2019). "Yanou Collart, sa grande histoire d'amour avec Lino Ventura" [Yanou Collart, her great love story with Lino Ventura]. sudinfo.be (in French).
- "Yanou Collart". Gala.
- "If the name Yanou Collart means nothing..." Chicago Tribune. 9 August 2021.
- Davis, Ivor (11 September 1988). "Serving the Stars". Ventura County Star.
- "Hudson made personal decision to go public on his ailment". Associated Press. 26 July 1985.
