= Love, Mary =

1985 television film directed by Robert Day

- Genre: Drama
- Written by: Clifford Campion
- Directed by: Robert Day
- Starring: Kristy McNichol
- Music by: Robert Drasnin
- Country of origin: United States
- Original language: English

Production
- Producer: Ellis A. Cohen
- Cinematography: Frank Stanley
- Editor: Ray Daniels
- Running time: 90 minutes
- Production company: CBS Entertainment Productions
- Budget: Completed under budget, filming in Vancouver, British Columbia, Canada.

Original release
- Network: CBS
- Release: October 8, 1985

Love, Mary is a 1985 American made-for-television drama film based on the true story of Dr. Mary Groda-Lewis (portrayed by Kristy McNichol) who achieved a career in family medicine despite a personal struggle with dyslexia. The film originally aired on CBS on October 8, 1985. The made-for-TV movie was directed by Robert Day.

== Plot ==
Mary Louise Groda was a lonely and poor child, from a family of poor farm workers in Portland, Oregon. She was in frequent trouble with juvenile authorities, partly because she hated to go to school.

After a number of breaks from juvenile authorities, Mary's good luck ran out. She and another troubled male teen got caught while they were joy-riding with a stolen car that they crashed. That joy-ride and the subsequent crash were enough for the judge hearing Groda's case, who had no choice but to incarcerate Mary.

A social worker took an interest in Mary, who was sixteen years of age by that time, and realized that she struggled with dyslexia. She then helped Mary excel in studies. Mary gained confidence and began to fight back against her impediment, eventually going to college, earning an M.D. degree. She chose the family practice of pediatrics as her medical specialty.

== Cast ==
- Kristy McNichol as Mary Groda-Lewis
- David Paymer as David Lewis
- Piper Laurie as Christine Groda
- Rachel Ticotin as Rachel Martin
- Lycia Naff as Delia
- Romy Windsor as Jeanine
- David Faustino as Christopher
- David Sage as Dr. Miller

== See also ==
- List of artistic depictions of dyslexia
