= Daphne Ashbrook =

American actress (born 1963)

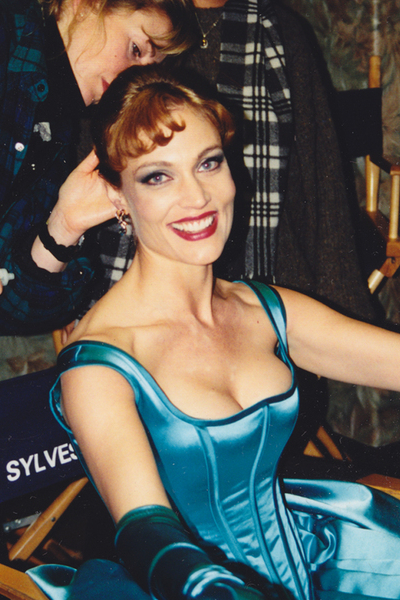
- Ashbrook on the set of the 1996 film Doctor Who
- Born: Daphne Lee Ashbrook; January 30, 1963 (age 63); Long Beach, California, U.S.
- Years active: 1982–2012; 2021-present
- Known for: Doctor Who: The Movie; Hollywood Heights
- Partner: Lorenzo Lamas (1986–1988)
- Children: 1
- Relatives: Dana Ashbrook (brother)
- Website: daphneashbrook.com

Daphne Lee Ashbrook (born January 30, 1963) is an American actress best known for playing Grace Holloway in Doctor Who: The Movie, Melora Pazlar in Star Trek: Deep Space Nine, Jackie Kowalski in Hollywood Heights, and Dawn Atwood in The OC.

== Early years ==
Born in Long Beach, California, on January 30, 1963, Ashbrook is the daughter of actor/director Buddy Ashbrook and actress D'Ann Paton.

== Career ==
Ashbrook gained early acting experience on stage in the Los Angeles area. Productions in which she appeared included Burlesque ... The Way You Like It (1982), Come Blow Your Horn (1983), and The Coming of Stork (1984).

She guest starred on the show Riptide in an episode that aired on October 2, 1984, titled, "Where The Girls Are." She played a character named Courtland Reece.

She also played Liz McKay in the ABC crime drama Our Family Honor (1985–1986), Kathy Davenport on the ABC crime drama Fortune Dane (1986) and Alex in the ABC comedy-drama Hooperman (1987–1989). In 1990, she appeared as Phyllis Gates, Rock Hudson's wife, in the television film Rock Hudson.

In 1984 she appeared in the TV series Knight Rider, in the episode "A Knight in Shining Armor", starring as Katherine Granger.

Ashbrook played the titular character in "Melora", a 1993 episode of Star Trek: Deep Space Nine.

She played Grace Holloway in the 1996 television film Doctor Who—a portrayal that upset some fans because she was the first character to romantically kiss the Doctor.

A 2004 trip to the United Kingdom was filmed for the 2005 documentary Daphne Ashbrook in the UK. This DVD documentary followed her work with Doctor Who, including her role as Perfection in the Big Finish Productions audio play The Next Life.

In 2006, Ashbrook played Charlotte Howell in the audio drama Dark Shadows: The Book of Temptation. She was featured in extensive interviews on the Doctor Who podcasts Doctor Who: DWO Whocast, and Doctor Who: Podshock as well as in other podcasts including "The Happiness Patrol".

Other television work includes Cold Case, CSI, Crossing Jordan, JAG, Murder, She Wrote, Judging Amy and Intruders. She had a recurring role on The O.C.. Other appearances include the film The Lodger (2009), and episodes of NCIS, Ghost Whisperer, Without a Trace, and Fame. In 2012 she starred as Jackie in the Nickelodeon night time soap Hollywood Heights.

In 2012, Ashbrook released her memoir, entitled Dead Woman Laughing (An actor's take from both sides of the camera). It details her life as an actor and her experience growing up in an acting family.

== Personal life ==
In 1988, Ashbrook and her then-partner, Lorenzo Lamas (whom she had met while appearing on Falcon Crest), had a daughter.

== Filmography ==
=== Film ===
Year	Title	Role	Notes
1984	Gimme an 'F'	Phoebe Willis	
1986	Quiet Cool	Katy Greer	
1992	Sunset Heat	Julie	
1995	Automatic	Nora Rochester	
1999	Dumbarton Bridge	Belinda	
2000	Delia's Song	Sara Malone	
2004	For No Good Reason	Unknown	
2009	The Lodger	Pretty Woman	

=== Television ===
Year	Title	Role	Notes
1983	Hardcastle and McCormick	Melinda	2 episodes
1983–1988	Falcon Crest	Kathryn Anderson / Leslie Perkins	4 episodes
1984	Knight Rider	Katherine Granger	Episode: "A Knight in Shining Armor"
1984	Riptide	Portland Reed	Episode: "Where the Girls Are"
1984	Fame	Sasha	Episode: "Czech-Mate"
1985	Street Hawk	Deborah Shain	Episode: "Dog Eat Dog"
1985	The A-Team	Patty Sullivan	Episode: "Road Games"
1985	Simon & Simon	Mavis Delaporte	Episode: "The Mickey Mouse Mob"
1985	The Fall Guy	Casey	Episode: "Reel Trouble"
1985	Brothers-in-Law	Barbara Jean	Television film
1985–1986	Our Family Honor	Liz McKay	13 episodes
1986	Fortune Dane	"Speed" Davenport	Episode: "Fortune Dane"
1986	That Secret Sunday	Collie Sherwood	Television film
1987	Carly's Web	Carly Fox	Television film
1987	Perry Mason: The Case of the Murdered Madam	Miranda Bonner	Television film
1988	Longarm	Pearl	Television film
1988	14 Going on 30	Peggy Noble	Television film
1989	Hooperman	Alex	5 episodes
1990	Rock Hudson	Phyllis Gates	Television film
1990	Sisters	MacKenzie Morrison Wyles	Television film
1990–1995	Murder, She Wrote	Kathy Stafford / Alexis Hill / Alice Diamond	3 episodes
1991	Daughters of Privilege	Mary Hope	Television film
1992	Intruders	Lesley Hahn	2 episodes
1993	Poisoned by Love: The Kern County Murders	Dyna	Television film
1993	Star Trek: Deep Space Nine	Melora Pazlar	Episode: "Melora"
1994	Dead Man's Revenge	Carrey Rose	Television film
1994	Sisters	Maggie Falconer	2 episodes
1994	One West Waikiki	Sue Dineheart	Episode: "Along Came a Spider"
1994	Diagnosis: Murder	Georgia	Episode: "Georgia on My Mind"
1995	Jake Lassiter: Justice on the Bayou	Susan Corrigan	Television film
1995	Sweet Justice	Nicole	Episode: "Fire"
1995	Charlie Grace	Linda Lane	Episode: "Take Me to the Pilot"
1995–1998	JAG	Annie Pendry	5 episodes
1996	Doctor Who	Grace Holloway	Television film
1996	The Burning Zone	Dr. Rachel Roberson	Episode: "Touch of the Dead"
1997	Beyond Belief: Fact or Fiction	Mrs. Johnson	2 episodes
1997	Pacific Palisades	Julie Graham	4 episodes
1998	The Love Letter	Debra Zabriskie	Television film
1998	Sleepwalkers	Unknown	Episode: "Eye of the Beholder"
1999	Profiler	Laura Stevenson / Nikki Fleming	Episode: "All in the Family"
1999	Cupid	Mona Lovesong	Episode: "Grand Delusions"
2001	The Guardian	Samantha Furnari	Episode: "Feeding Frenzy"
2002	Judging Amy	Beth, Concerned Mother	Episode: "Women in Cacti with a Curled Up Rat"
2003	Kingpin	Unknown	Episode: "The Odd Couple"
2003–2006	The O.C.	Dawn Atwood	5 episodes
2005	Crossing Jordan	Mrs. Carter	Episode: "Englightenment"
2005	CSI: Crime Scene Investigation	Buffet Manager	Episode: "Dog Eat Dog"
2007	Cold Case	Kylie Cramer '07	Episode: "Thick as Thieves"
2007	Supreme Courtships	Mrs. Smith	Television film
2008	Ghost Whisperer	Sandy Graber	Episode: "Big Chills"
2008	Without a Trace	Paula Wechsler	Episode: "True/False"
2010	Law & Order: LA	Jodi Morris	Episode: "Playa Vista"
2011	NCIS	Donna Peyton	Episode: "Out of the Frying Pan"
2012	Hollywood Heights	Jackie Kowalski	61 episodes
2021	A Wild Endeavour	Harmony	Television film
