= The Guardian (1990 film) =

1990 film by William Friedkin

- Promotional film poster
- Directed by: William Friedkin
- Screenplay by: William Friedkin; Dan Greenburg; Stephen Volk
- Based on: The Nanny by Dan Greenburg
- Produced by: Joe Wizan
- Starring: Jenny Seagrove; Dwier Brown; Carey Lowell
- Cinematography: John A. Alonzo
- Edited by: Seth Flaum
- Music by: Jack Hues
- Distributed by: Universal Pictures
- Release date: April 27, 1990
- Running time: 92 minutes
- Country: United States
- Language: English
- Budget: $10 million
- Box office: $17 million

The Guardian is a 1990 American supernatural horror film co-written and directed by William Friedkin, and starring Jenny Seagrove, Dwier Brown, Carey Lowell, Brad Hall, and Miguel Ferrer. The plot follows a suburban Los Angeles couple who hire a nanny to care for their infant son, only to discover she is in fact a Hamadryad whose previous clients' children went missing under her care. The film is based on the novel The Nanny by Dan Greenburg, who co-wrote the screenplay with Friedkin and Stephen Volk.

Director Sam Raimi was originally attached to the project, before dropping out to direct Darkman. Heavily marketed as director Friedkin's first foray into the horror genre since 1973's The Exorcist, the film had a troubled production, with the script undergoing changes that continued well into the shooting process.

The film was released in the spring of 1990, and had a generally unfavorable critical reception, later making Roger Ebert's "most hated films" list. A cable television version of the film was credited to "Alan Von Smithee", due to Friedkin's wish to disassociate himself from its release.

== Plot ==
Molly and Allan Sheridan leave their two children in the care of a new nanny, Diana Julian. Diana, who is in fact an ancient Hamadryad, kidnaps their infant daughter, taking her to a forest where she approaches a giant, gnarled tree, serving the child as a human sacrifice to sustain the tree's life. As she stares into a pool of water, Diana's reflection transforms to that of a growling wolf.

Three months later, Phil and Kate Sterling have recently relocated from Chicago to Los Angeles, where Phil has taken a lucrative advertising job. Kate becomes pregnant, and gives birth to a son, Jake. The couple decide to hire a nanny to allow each of them to maintain their jobs, and interview two candidates through a nanny agency: a young woman named Arlene, and a caring English woman, Camilla. When Arlene dies in a bicycling accident, Camilla is swiftly hired and becomes an invaluable member of the Sterlings' household.

One afternoon while Camilla rests in a meadow with Jake, she is approached by three aggressive bikers (Outlaw motorcycle club) who attempt to sexually assault her. She flees to the base of the gnarled tree, which subsequently comes to life, its branches strangling and eviscerating the men. Wolves consume the entrails of one of them, and another is impaled by the tree's root and then bursts into flame. During a dinner party some days later, Ned, the Sterlings' neighbor who designed their home, invites Camilla on a date, which she declines. That night, Phil has a nightmare in which he has sex with Camilla. The next day, moments after Camilla leaves to go shopping, Ned stops by the house with a bouquet of flowers for her. Kate explains she just left on foot, and Ned drives after her, catching sight of her fleeing into the forest. Ned pursues her, eventually coming across her bathing in the creek. He watches as Camilla approaches the large tree, and begins to fuse with the tree bark. A pack of wolves pursue Ned, who flees back to his house. He leaves a rambling phone message for Phil and Kate. Moments later, Camilla appears, naked and ashen, on the hearth, telling Ned that he should not have followed her before the wolves break into the home, eating him alive. Camilla drags his remains away.

When checking the answering machine the following morning, Phil finds two messages: One from a stranger, Molly Sheridan, who says it is urgent she speak with him. The next is Ned's, which is incoherent, but Camilla interrupts him from finishing listening to it. Phil meets with Molly the next day. She describes the disappearance of her infant daughter, as well as the nanny Diana, whom she came to discover to have been a false identity. She requests that Phil arrange for her to see Camilla, suspecting they are the same person. When Phil returns home, he listens to Ned's message in full, which warns him against letting Camilla back in the house. Discovering Ned is missing, Phil confronts Camilla in front of Kate, but Jake grows violently ill during the confrontation and has to be rushed to the hospital, exhibiting coma-like symptoms.

Jake regains consciousness in the hospital, and Camilla attempts to kidnap him, but Phil intercepts, backhand slapped Camilla to the ground. Phil and Kate depart with Jake, and upon arriving home are confronted by a pack of wolves. Kate flees to the couple's Jeep, while Phil runs toward the woods with Jake, as Camilla pursues them both, levitating through the forest, until they reach the large tree. Kate chases after them in the Jeep, eventually hitting and seemingly killing Camilla. As Phil examines Camilla's body, he notices faces of babies embossed in the tree bark.

Later, a detective tells the couple no evidence of Camilla's existence can be found. Phil decides to cut down the tree with a chainsaw, but in his absence, Kate is attacked by Camilla—now part-tree, part-human—who has again infiltrated the house. As Phil attempts to cut the tree, the branches entangle him and begin to bleed as he inflicts damage on them. The damage concurrently impacts Camilla, who is fighting Kate. When Phil saws off a large branch, Camilla's leg severs from her body, allowing Kate to push her out a window. Simultaneously, Phil manages to fell the tree, but it combusts before landing, as Camilla's body similarly disintegrates before hitting the ground. A bloodied Phil drops the chainsaw and returns home as Kate picks up Jake. Seeing the mess in the house, Phil realizes what happened as he is reunited with his wife and son, now knowing that with Camilla finally dead, his family is now safe.

== Cast ==
- Jenny Seagrove as Camilla Grandier / Diana Julian
- Dwier Brown as Phil Sterling
- Carey Lowell as Kate Sterling
- Brad Hall as Ned Runcie
- Miguel Ferrer as Ralph Hess
- Natalia Nogulich as Molly Sheridan
- Pamela Brull as Gail Krasno
- Gary Swanson as Allan Sheridan
- Jack David Walker as Punk #1
- Willy Parsons as Punk #2
- Frank Noon as Punk #3
- Theresa Randle as Arlene Russell
- Xander Berkeley as Detective
- Jacob Gelman as Scotty Sheridan
- Ray Reinhardt as Dr. Klein

== Themes ==
Scholar Pauline Greenhill interprets The Guardian as an example of a contemporary "manifestly counterculture" Hansel and Gretel-inspired film, with Camilla exemplifying the "monstrous feminine" and an "interloping presence in the conventional nuclear family."

== Production ==
=== Development ===
Director Sam Raimi was originally attached to the project, but dropped out to direct Darkman, with director William Friedkin subsequently signing on. Friedkin stated he was drawn to the "magical realism" of the story, adding that the central element of "a baby in danger and a young married couple with all kinds of anxieties about the care of their infant child." He also commented that he related to the story due to a negative personal experience he had with employing a nanny to look after his son: "My wife and I went away for two days and we came back to this girl and her girlfriend who'd picked three guys up in a bar and brought them back to our house. They were in our bed while our baby was in the room." Friedkin later stated that he envisioned the film as a "contemporary Grimm fairytale."

=== Screenplay ===
The original screenplay for The Guardian bore a closer resemblance to its source material, The Nanny (1987) by novelist Dan Greenburg, which told the story of a nanny who steals children. The script, which had originally been conceived as a tongue-in-cheek thriller for director Sam Raimi, eventually "metamorphosed into something different" as Friedkin made numerous changes. Volk attempted to rework the script for Friedkin, initially re-writing the character of the nanny as a real-life Lilith, the child-stealing demon from Jewish mythology. Friedkin dismissed the idea, and Volk then reworked the script into a straightforward psychological thriller about an unhinged woman stealing children; however, Universal Pictures objected to the reworking, stating that they wanted a "supernatural" horror film given Friedkin's reputation for The Exorcist (1973).

After Volk suggested using elements from the M. R. James story "The Ash-tree" in the script, Friedkin became fixated on incorporating a tree into Camilla's backstory. Volk reportedly suffered a nervous breakdown and left the production, leaving Friedkin to finish the script's loose ends after filming had already begun.

=== Casting ===
While the screenplay was still under development, Friedkin began auditioning for the role of Camilla. Uma Thurman was originally a candidate for the role prior to the script changes, after which British actress Jenny Seagrove was cast in the role.

=== Filming ===
The Guardian was shot on location in Los Angeles and Santa Clarita, California. The forest location featured in the film was shot at a nature preserve in Valencia, California, near Six Flags Magic Mountain.

The film's production was marked by continuous script changes that occurred throughout the filming process. In a 2011 interview, Jenny Seagrove recalled visiting Friedkin at his home in Los Angeles during the shoot, where he told her he had been reading about Druid mythology and wanted to incorporate it into the film. According to Seagrove: "Pages were flying at us [...] and then suddenly this idea of this weird kind of tree came about, and suddenly my character was not just a nanny but she was a Druid character who turned into a part of the tree, and she had to feed the tree—things were evolving all the time."

=== Special effects ===
Seagrove underwent numerous extensive makeup transformations in the film, at times covered in tree bark during the metamorphosing scenes.

The tree featured in the film was constructed by the special effects department in Burbank, California, and transported to the nature preserve in Valencia. The tree contained tubes of circulating fake blood in order for the tree to properly "bleed" when cut. During filming, Friedkin had fired the original effects crew after being dissatisfied with the appearance of the tree. The film features no optical special effects, employing only mechanical and practical effects.

== Release ==
The Guardian was released in North American cinemas on April 27, 1990, opening on 1,684 screens in the United States.

=== Television cut ===
The television version of the film ends with Phil and Kate returning home from the hospital with Jake, while Camilla is alive and naked at the tree. Director William Friedkin disapproved of the television cut of the film, and removed his name from the credits, naming "Alan von Smithee" as the director.

The video and DVD versions have the full ending, in which Camilla appears in her true form and tries to take the baby from Kate, but Phil cuts down the tree with a chainsaw, thus killing both it and Camilla.

=== Home media ===
The Guardian was released on VHS by MCA Universal home video in October 1990. It was later licensed by Universal for a DVD release through Anchor Bay Entertainment, released it on October 12, 1999. The DVD features an audio commentary by director Friedkin, as well as the original theatrical trailer. This release has been long out of print and is difficult to obtain, although a British region 2 DVD by Second Sight, also featuring Friedkin's commentary, was released in 2011.

The film was released on Blu-ray for the first time by Shout! Factory on January 19, 2016.

== Reception ==
=== Box office ===
The Guardian opened at #3 at the United States box office, with a USD$5,565,620 weekend. The film went on to gross a total of $17,037,887 domestically.

=== Critical response ===
The Guardian earned mostly negative reviews from critics upon its initial release. Roger Ebert of the Chicago Sun-Times gave the film one star out of four, and later named it as one of his "Most Hated Films". Janet Maslin of The New York Times gave the film a middling review, saying "[Friedkin] never sustains the story's tension for very long, and even cuts off the scarier episodes before they have a chance to sink in. What's more, he never offers a consistent idea of what sort of evil is at work here."

The Washington Post also gave the film a negative review, stating: "the plot is so preposterous that The Guardian never comes close to grabbing attention, empathy or sympathy." Dave Kehr of the Chicago Tribune wrote: "Like The Exorcist, The Guardian is a horror story set in the bosom of the nuclear family, and it, too, tries to exploit a culturewide fear, turning a shared guilt into monstrous projection. The guilt of The Guardian, however, is far more mundane and far less gripping than The Exorcist's agony over our abandonment of the church." Jay Carr of The Boston Globe wrote that the film was "pretty good claptrap," but noted that "as it makes its way to a bloody payoff, it loses immediacy and individuality, subsiding into bloody cliche."

Chris Hicks, writing for the Deseret News, gave the film a mixed assessment, noting: "Most of the movie is made up of eerie settings and zigzag camera angles and offbeat colored lighting, much of it quite effective in building and sustaining suspense—Friedkin is a seasoned director who knows how to manipulate audience emotions.But then a character opens his or her mouth and spoils everything. Loaded with little plot holes and illogical development, The Guardian asks a lot of us in the first place as we attempt to accept this killer tree in the forest."

Time Out said in their review of the film: "Friedkin opts for up-front hokum, interspersed with impressively ridiculous special effects, including man-eating trees, flying nannies and coniferous chainsaw carnage. A severely flawed but not unamusing venture from a director who should know better."

=== Modern appraisal ===
Director William Friedkin himself acknowledged the critical response. To the question "Which films were the farthest?" on his career, William Friedkin cited The Guardian and simply said about it: "The Guardian I don’t think works."

Actress Jenny Seagrove said of the film in retrospect, "I don't want to put off anyone from watching it because it is good fun," but noted that, during the first screening, "there was a feeling in the room that it wasn't the sort of picture everyone had hoped it was going to be." She also said: "It has become a cult film, but the screenplay was appalling. It was being written on the hoof."

In his book Horror Films of the 1990s (2011), critic John Kenneth Muir writes favorably of the film, noting that, despite it being "reviled" upon its original release, "The Guardian is actually a much better film than its critical reputation indicates. In particular, the movie concerns the in-vogue 1990s critique of unrestrained urban sprawl and development, and the ensuing battle between Technological Man and Mother Nature."

== See also ==
- Druid

== Sources ==
- Decherny, Peter (2013). Hollywood's Copyright Wars: From Edison to the Internet. New York City, New York: Columbia University Press. ISBN 978-0-231-15947-0.
- Greenhill, Pauline (2020). Reality, Magic, and Other Lies. Detroit, Michigan: Wayne State University Press. ISBN 978-0-814-34223-7.
- Muir, John Kenneth (2011). Horror Films of the 1990s. Jefferson, North Carolina: McFarland & Company. ISBN 978-0-786-48480-5.
