= Dwier Brown =

American actor (born 1959)

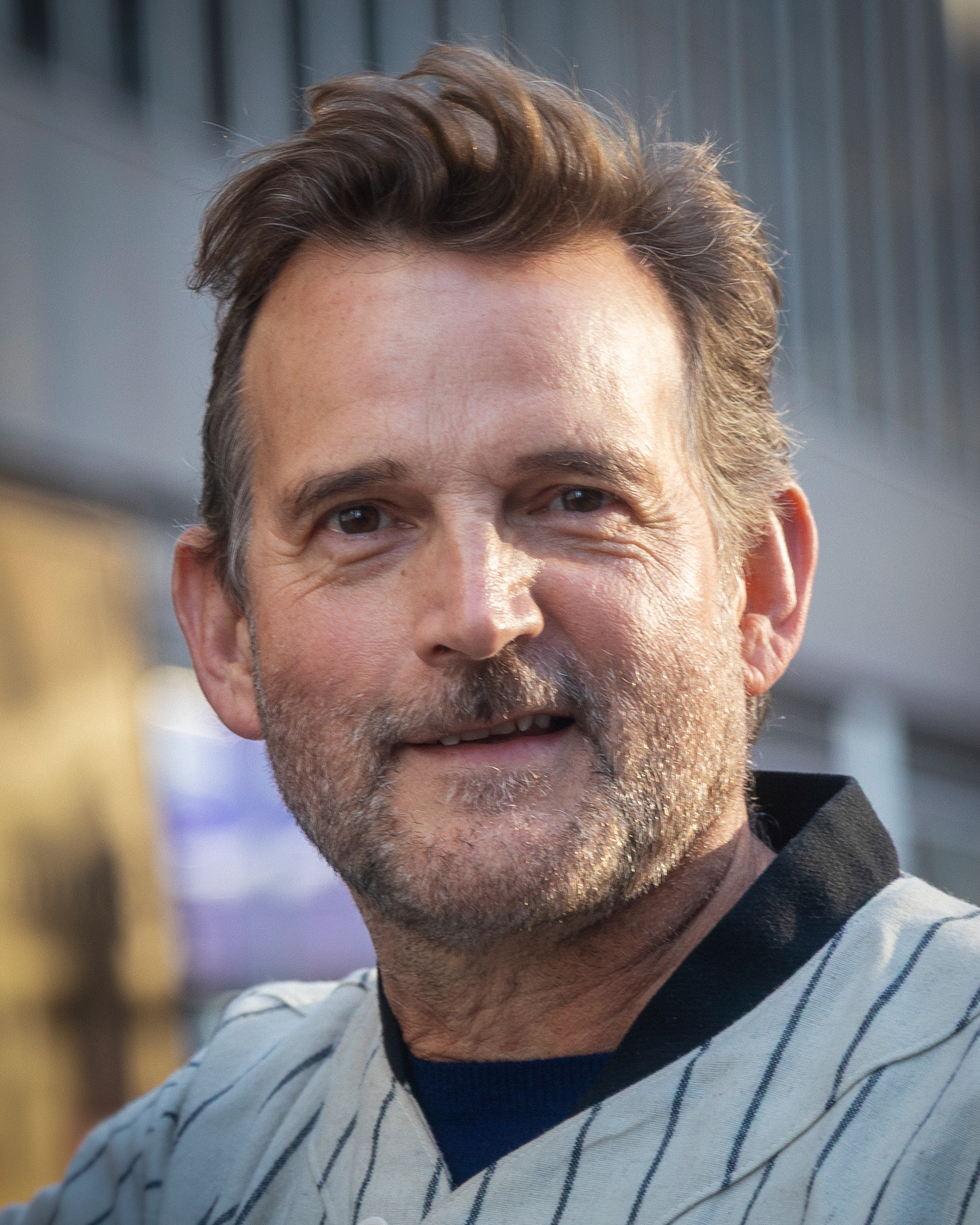
- Brown in 2019
- Born: January 30, 1959 (age 67); Norton, Ohio, U.S.
- Years active: 1982–2016
- Website: Official website

Dwier Brown (born January 30, 1959) is an American actor. In the 1989 film Field of Dreams he played John Kinsella, the father of Kevin Costner's character, and he played Henry Mitchell in Dennis the Menace Strikes Again in 1998. Brown has appeared in several horror films, such as House (1986) and The Guardian (1990), the latter directed by William Friedkin. He has also made appearances on several television series, including Firefly, Criminal Minds, and Ghost Whisperer. In 2014, he wrote a memoir titled If You Build It... described as a book about "fathers, fate, and Field of Dreams."

== Early life ==
Brown was born in 1959 in Wadsworth, Ohio. He graduated from Ashland University in Ashland, Ohio.

== Selected filmography ==
- The Member of the Wedding (1982, TV Movie) – Jarvis
- The Thorn Birds (1983, TV Mini-Series) – Stuart Cleary, adult
- To Live and Die in L.A. (1985) – Doctor
- Copacabana (1985, Tv Movie) – Bibi Sutton
- House (1986) – Lieutenant
- Tic Tac Dough (TV 1986) contestant on final six shows
- House II: The Second Story (1987) – Clarence
- Field of Dreams (1989) – John Kinsella
- The Guardian (1990) – Phil Sterling
- The Cutting Edge (1992) – Hale Forrest
- Galaxies Are Colliding (1992) – Adam
- Mom and Dad Save the World (1992) – Sirk
- Revenge on the Highway (1992, TV Movie) – Red Robin
- Quantum Leap (1992, TV Series) – Neil Walters
- Gettysburg (1993) – Capt. Brewer
- Without Warning (1994, TV Movie)–– Matt Jensen
- Goldilocks and the Three Bears (1995) – Hal
- Same River Twice (1996) – Mikey
- Dennis the Menace Strikes Again (1998) – Henry Mitchell
- Rip Girls (2000, TV Movie) – Ben Miller
- Reunion (2001) – Patrick
- The Zeros (2001) – Leo
- Falling Like This (2001) – Deputy Sheriff
- Red Dragon (2002) – Mr Jacobi
- Firefly (2003, Episode: "Trash") – Durran Haymer
- Criminal Minds (2006, TV Series) – William Copeland
- The Unit (2007, TV Series) – Ambassador Blashek
- Fast Girl (2008) – Bill Johnstone
- Crazy (2008) – Businessman in busy
- We Shall Remain: Tecumseh's Vision (2009) – William Henry Harrison
- The Intervention (2009) – Matthew Garret
- Freedom Riders (2009, TV Series)
- Ghost Whisperer (2010, TV Series) – Jeff
- CSI: Crime Scene Investigation (2010, TV Series) – Young Sam Braun
- Locked Down (2010) – Kirkman
- Private Practice (2012, TV Series) – Matthew
- Ironside (2013, TV Series) – Carter Watson
- Rizzoli & Isles (2016) – Priest
