= Galaxies Are Colliding =

- Directed by: John Ryman
- Written by: John Ryman
- Produced by: Stanley Wilson; John Ryman
- Starring: Dwier Brown; Kelsey Grammer
- Cinematography: Philip Lee
- Edited by: Ivan Ladizinsky
- Music by: Stephen Barber
- Production company: Covert Prods.
- Distributed by: SC Entertainment
- Release date: May 12, 1992 (Cannes)
- Running time: 93 minutes
- Countries: Canada; United States
- Language: English

Galaxies Are Colliding is a 1992 Canadian-American comedy film written and directed by John Ryman and starring Dwier Brown and Kelsey Grammer in his feature film debut.

== Cast ==
- Dwier Brown as Adam
- Susan Walters as Beth
- Karen Medak as Margo
- James K. Ward as Psycho
- Kelsey Grammer as Peter
- Rick Overton as Rex

== Release ==
The film was released at the Cannes Film Festival on May 12, 1992.

== Reception ==
Nisid Hajari of Entertainment Weekly graded the film a C− and wrote, "In the end, Brown reinforces a lesson that he should have learned in Scriptwriting 101: Anomie, by definition, is dull."
