= Phyllis Gates =

American secretary and interior decorator, wife of Rock Hudson (1925–2006)

- Born: Phyllis Lucille Gates; December 7, 1925; Dawson, Minnesota, U.S.
- Died: January 4, 2006 (aged 80); Marina del Rey, California, U.S.
- Occupations: Secretary, Interior Decorator
- Spouse: Rock Hudson (m. 1955; div. 1958)

Phyllis Lucille Gates (December 7, 1925 – January 4, 2006) was an American secretary and interior decorator, known for her three-year marriage to the actor Rock Hudson. The story of their marriage was depicted in the TV film Rock Hudson (1990), starring Daphne Ashbrook as Gates and Thomas Ian Griffith as Hudson.

== Early life ==
Gates was born in Dawson, Minnesota, to Leo Gates (1896–1970) and Mabel (née Johnson) Gates (1900–1999), and raised on a farm. She graduated from Clarkfield High School in June 1943. Early in her life, she worked as a sales clerk in a department store, flight attendant, and secretary for a New York City talent agent, before moving to Hollywood to work for talent agent Henry Willson, who represented actors Rock Hudson, Tab Hunter, and Rory Calhoun.

== Marriage to Rock Hudson ==
Gates met Rock Hudson in October 1954. They started dating some time later and were married in Santa Barbara, California, on November 9, 1955, shortly after he finished filming Giant. Following a brief honeymoon in Jamaica, their marriage began to disintegrate. They separated in 1957, following rumors that Hudson had committed adultery while on location in Italy for the film A Farewell to Arms. The rumors were later confirmed by a close friend of Gates's, who also revealed to her that the individual Hudson had the affair with was a man. In 1958, Gates secretly recorded Hudson confessing his sexual orientation to her. Their divorce was finalized in 1958.

== Later life ==
Gates later became a successful interior decorator. She died from lung cancer at her home in Marina del Rey, California, aged 80. She was survived by her sister Marvis Ketelsen and brother Russell Gates.

In her autobiography, published in 1987 after Hudson's 1985 death from AIDS, Gates wrote that she was in love with Hudson and unaware that he was gay when they got married. However, author and journalist Robert Hofler wrote in the biography The Man Who Invented Rock Hudson: "Those who knew her (Gates) say she was a lesbian who tried to blackmail her movie star husband (Hudson)" or "She then became addicted to being the wife of a star, and didn't want the divorce (...) Phyllis could play around with women, but Rock had to remain faithful to her. In a way, she was just being pragmatic: she feared that Rock's exposure would ruin his fame, which was in turn her gravy train."

This was disputed by Gates in an interview with Larry King in which she also said that she had been the one to initiate the divorce based on her husband's behavior. Gates said she did not get much in the divorce because she did not want to take advantage of him. She also said that she had never stopped loving him, and that he was the 'love of her life'.

== Published works ==
- Gates, Phyllis (1987) and Sara Davidson, My Husband, Rock Hudson, Doubleday, 232 pages. ISBN 978-0207157844
