= Rock Hudson (film) =

1990 biographical television film directed by John Nicolella

- VHS cover
- Genre: Biographical drama
- Based on: My Husband, Rock Hudson by Phyllis Gates
- Written by: Dennis Turner
- Directed by: John Nicolella
- Starring: Thomas Ian Griffith; Daphne Ashbrook; William R. Moses
- Music by: Paul Chihara
- Country of origin: United States
- Original language: English

Production
- Executive producers: Larry Sanitsky; Frank Konigsberg
- Producers: Renee Palyo; Diana Kerew
- Cinematography: Newton Thomas Sigel
- Editor: Peter Parasheles
- Running time: 100 minutes
- Production company: Konigsberg International

Original release
- Network: ABC
- Release: January 8, 1990

Rock Hudson is a 1990 American biographical drama television film directed by John Nicolella and written by Dennis Turner. The film is based on My Husband, Rock Hudson, a 1987 autobiography by Phyllis Gates, actor Rock Hudson's ex-wife (1955–1958). It is the story of their marriage, written after Hudson's 1985 death from AIDS. In the book, Gates wrote that she was in love with Hudson and that she did not know Hudson was gay when they married, and was not complicit in his deception.

The movie was reviewed badly by many critics, attracted only 24% of the viewing audience and suffered some advertiser defections because of concern over the depiction of Hudson's homosexuality. It placed 29th in the Nielsen ratings for the week ending January 14, 1990.

Robert Iger claimed that research showed that ABC lost $1 million in advertising due to the broadcast of the film.

== Plot ==
The story begins at the conclusion of the Marc Christian trial, former lover of the deceased Rock Hudson who is suing the Rock Hudson Estate because Hudson continued having intimacy with him even after finding out he had AIDS. The story then flashes back to cover Hudson's life and career.

In 1948, Truck driver Roy Fitzgerald walks into talent manager Henry Willson's office, wanting to be a movie star. Willson gets the newly named "Rock Hudson" a one-line role in a war film (1948's Fighter Squadron), which takes him 38 times to get right. His mother, Kay, is not impressed about his new career.

On a film set, Hudson meets Tim Murphy and they start a relationship, eventually moving in together. Willson is alarmed by this and urges Hudson to keep it a secret. Wilson also introduces Rock to his new secretary, Phyllis Gates. The two fall in love, much to Tim's heartbreak. Tim breaks up with Rock and he moves out. Soon after that Rock and Phyllis marry and move in together. While in this new relationship, Rock still visits gay bars. Phyllis is shocked and they later divorce and he fires Willson as his manager.

Hudson's career begins to decline in the 60s. On the set of the 1966 film Seconds, where he plays a middle-aged man who underwent radical plastic surgery in an attempt to recapture his lost youth, he gets upset to the point where he has a breakdown. Director John Frankenheimer has to close the set to comfort a crying Hudson. Hudson's mother also dies later on. Hudson then meets Marc Christian; they become lovers, but Hudson does not tell him that he has AIDS. Hudson attempts a secret treatment in Paris, but has to cut it short to appear on Dynasty in late 1984.

Later, long time friend Doris Day joins Hudson for a press conference, where the secret and Hudson are outed. Hudson dies of AIDS, and Christian sues Hudson's estate for putting him in danger.

== Cast ==
- Thomas Ian Griffith as Rock Hudson
- Daphne Ashbrook as Phyllis Gates
- William R. Moses as Marc Christian
- Andrew Robinson as Henry Willson
- Thom Mathews as Tim Murphy
- Michael Ensign as Mark Miller
- Diane Ladd as Kay
- Joycelyn O'Brien as Sally
- Don Galloway as John Frankenheimer
- Mathieu Carrière as French Doctor
- Larry Dobkin as Raoul Walsh
- Jean Kasem as Madge
- George Christy as Reporter
- John Shepard as Captain 'Fighter Squadron'
- Francis Guinan as Carl
- Rhoda Gemignani as TV Producer
- Julie Tesh as May
- Diane Behrens as Doris Day

The film includes archive footage of Doris Day, Rock Hudson, John F. Kennedy, Martin Luther King Jr., James Quinn, and Natalie Wood.

== Background and production ==
In addition to Gates autobiography, the movie is also based on magazine articles, interviews and court records, including transcripts of the Los Angeles Superior Court trial after which Marc Christian won a settlement of $21.75 million from the actor's estate because Hudson had hidden from him the fact that he was suffering from AIDS. Later, Marc Miller, who was Hudson's secretary, accused the movie of malicious lies. In April 1989, the court award to Christian was reduced to $5.5 million.

In 1989, both ABC and NBC started developing plans for a biography of Hudson, NBC had announced it had commissioned a script, but ABC had already completed a movie. It aired on ABC on January 8, 1990. NBC later decided not to complete its four-hour miniseries.

Writer Dennis Turner initially turned down an offer to write the screenplay because "he had also led a double life." Turner recalls he eventually agreed because they kept contacting him about doing the movie, and the reason he originally said no, was because he "didn't know how seriously they wanted to treat his homosexuality." He said that he didn't want this one to resemble the Liberace movies where "they didn't adequately acknowledge his homosexuality." He goes on to state that he wanted the teleplay to show how complex it can be for a man "who happened to be gay and a human being." He also opined that he was sick and tired of the mainstream media and the "everyday population" stereotyping the LGBTQ community as a "joke or a walking disease." His goal he recalls was to depict that "keeping secrets and not being able to be honest is destructive to everyone."

Thomas Ian Griffith, who had gained considerable fame in the 1980s for his recurring role on the NBC soap opera Another World (1984–1987) and as the villain in The Karate Kid Part III (1989) was chosen to portray the actor; he is 6 feet 5 inches tall and Hudson was 6 feet 4 inches. He had to spend up to four hours in makeup to portray the older Hudson.

== Critical reception ==
John J. O'Connor of the New York Times said the film was "a sympathetic treatment of the actor's life and career" and "a generally feasible portrait". He also praised Thomas Ian Griffith's performance as Rock Hudson. Television critic Rick Kogan wrote the movie "is at times painfully melodramatic, superficial and hackneyed; it does contain a few bare-chested hugs, a couple of longing glances and any number of bulging biceps, but it refuses to fall into the campy or crude; it is by no stretch a good movie but it is not bad or distasteful either."

Television critic Tom Shales said this "is one of those movies where everybody kind of waltzes around on tippy-toe; it's like the producers sold the network on doing the film and then got very nervous about the whole idea." He further opines that it is hard to "accept the weak actor cast as Hudson; he's good looking, but not in the bravura way Hudson was."

Bob Niedt of the Syracuse Herald-Journal wrote, "chances are just about anyone who watches this will find it at least slightly disturbing; but while culture does get shocked, the producers hold back; knowing glances, tender words, hand-holding and arms around waists lead to nothing more than awkward hugs; apparently two men kissing would be too much for prime-time."

== See also ==
- List of LGBTQ-related films of 1990
- List of made-for-television films with LGBT characters
