= Sunset Heat (film) =

1992 film by John Nicolella

- Directed by: John Nicolella
- Written by: John Allen Nelson; Max Strom
- Produced by: Kandice King; Lance King
- Starring: Michael Paré; Adam Ant; Dennis Hopper; Daphne Ashbrook; Charlie Schlatter
- Cinematography: Charles Rosher Jr.
- Edited by: Christopher Koefoed
- Music by: Jan Hammer
- Production company: Beam Entertainment
- Release date: September 12, 1992
- Running time: 90 minutes
- Country: United States
- Language: English

Sunset Heat (Midnight Heat in the UK) is a 1992 thriller film directed by John Nicolella (in his theatrical film directorial debut) and starring Michael Paré, Adam Ant, and Dennis Hopper. It featured original music by Jan Hammer, who previously worked with Nicolella on the television series Miami Vice.

== Plot ==
Photographer Eric Wright from New York City visits his friend Danny Rollins in Los Angeles. Danny had stolen a million dollars from drug dealer Carl Madson, a former partner of Eric. When Danny is murdered without having told anyone where the money is, Carl demands that Eric finds it for him even though he has no idea where it might be.

== Cast ==
- Michael Paré as Eric Wright
- Adam Ant as Danny Rollins
- Dennis Hopper as Carl Madson
- Daphne Ashbrook as Julie
- Charlie Schlatter as David
- Tracy Tweed as Lena
- Little Richard as Brandon
- Luca Bercovici Detective Cook
- Tony Todd as Drucker
- Joe Lara as Todd
- Michael Talbott as Bartender
- Cindy Valentine as Holly
- Julie Strain as Silver Statuette
- Paul Ben-Victor as New Yorker
