= John Nicolella =

American film director (1945–1998)

- Born: John Joseph Nicolella; May 28, 1945
- Died: February 21, 1998 (aged 52); Los Angeles, California, U.S.
- Occupation(s): Film director, film producer, television director, television producer
- Years active: 1971–1997
- Spouse: Patti Kent Nicolella
- Children: 4

John Joseph Nicolella (May 28, 1945 – February 21, 1998) was an American film and television director and producer. He was best known for his work on the 1980s television series Miami Vice.

== Career ==
Nicolella began his career working as an assistant director on the Ivan Passer-directed film Born to Win (1971). Other films soon followed, the Paul Newman-directed film The Effect of Gamma Rays on Man-in-the-Moon Marigolds (1972), Crazy Joe (1974) starring Peter Boyle, Sweet Revenge (1976) starring Stockard Channing and Sam Waterston and Time Square (1980). He was also as a production manager on the films Saturday Night Fever (1977), Curse of the Pink Panther (1983) and co-produced Easy Money starring Rodney Dangerfield, Joe Pesci, and Jennifer Jason Leigh.

In 1984, he joined the production crew of Miami Vice directing a number of episodes until 1987. He continued working with the show's star Don Johnson directing the music video short film for Johnson's song "Heartbeat" from the album of the same name. They reunited again when Nicolella served as executive producer for eight episodes of Nash Bridges.

Nicolella's other directorial television credits include M.A.N.T.I.S., Crime Story, Leg Work, Gabriel's Fire, Dark Justice, Melrose Place, Key West, Marker and Super Force.

He also directed a number of television films, most notably Mike Hammer: Murder Takes All (1989) and Rock Hudson (1990), as well as all four of the Vanishing Son films. He also directed the theatrical features Sunset Heat (1992) and Kull the Conqueror (1997), his final directing credit before his death in 1998.

== Death ==
Nicolella died on February 21, 1998. He is survived by his wife, Patti Kent Nicolella, daughters Jennifer, Cynthia and Sofia, a son, Nicholas and sister Loretta Bruccoleri.
