= Bitter Harvest =

Bitter Harvest may refer to:

== Films ==
- Bitter Harvest (1963 film), a film by Peter Graham Scott
- Bitter Harvest (1981 film), a television movie about contamination of dairy feed in the U.S. Midwest
- Bitter Harvest (1992 film), a British television film by Charles Pattinson and Winsome Pinnock in the anthology series ScreenPlay
- Bitter Harvest (1993 film), a thriller by Duane Clark
- Bitter Harvest (2017 film), a film by George Mendeluk

== Books ==
- Bitter Harvest, a 1999 true crime novel by Ann Rule about the Debora Green case
- The Great Betrayal: The Memoirs of Ian Douglas Smith, a 1997 book by the former Prime Minister of Rhodesia, Ian Smith, republished in 2001 under the title Bitter Harvest: The Great Betrayal
- Bitter Harvest, a 1989 book about the modern history of Palestine by Sami Hadawi
