= Dana Ashbrook =

American actor (born 1967)

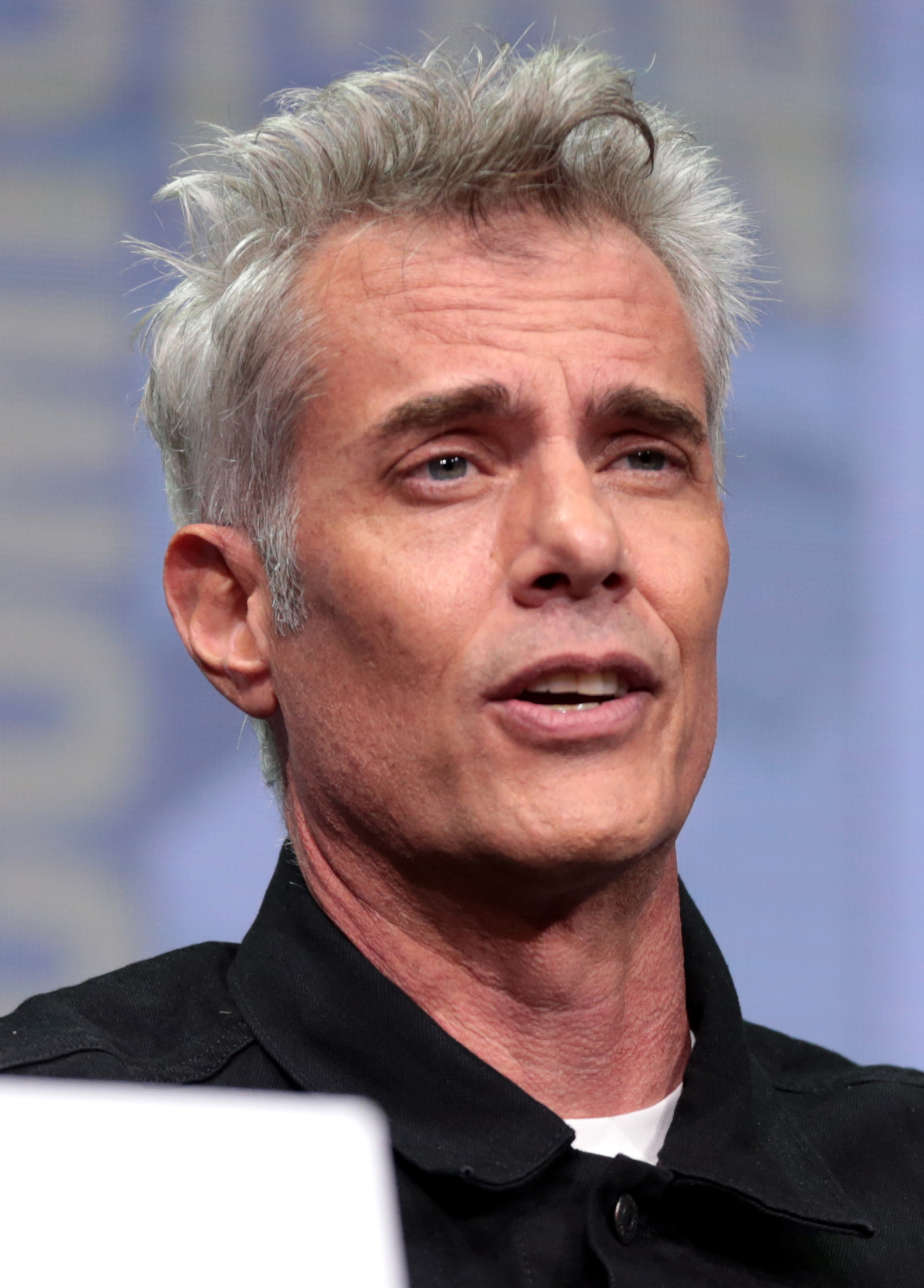
- Ashbrook at the 2017 San Diego Comic-Con
- Born: Dana Vernon Ashbrook; May 24, 1967 (age 59); San Diego, California, U.S.
- Occupation: Actor
- Years active: 1978–present
- Spouses: Kate Rogal (m. 2015; div. 2023); Jennifer Aborn (m. 2026)
- Relatives: Daphne Ashbrook (sister)

Dana Vernon Ashbrook (born May 24, 1967) is an American actor, best known for playing Bobby Briggs on the television series Twin Peaks (1990–1991, 2017) and its 1992 prequel film Twin Peaks: Fire Walk with Me.

== Early life ==
Ashbrook was born in San Diego, California; his mother, D'Ann (née Paton) is a teacher and his father, Vernon L. "Buddy" Ashbrook, was a director of the Palomar College drama department. He is the brother of writer Taylor Ashbrook and actress Daphne Ashbrook.

== Career ==
In 1978, Ashbrook made his film debut in an uncredited role in Attack of the Killer Tomatoes A decade later, after an acting hiatus, Ashbrook guest starred on the television series Cagney & Lacey, Knots Landing, and ABC Afterschool Special before starring as Tom Essex in the 1988 horror film Return of the Living Dead Part II. The same year, he starred in the horror film Waxwork alongside Deborah Foreman and guest starred on an episode of 21 Jump Street. He was next cast to co-star in an independent film produced by Ian Page Productions titled A Place to Hide, originally set to begin filming in November 1988, before it was delayed. The film was later made in 1990, retitled as Night of the Warrior, but without Ashbrook and a different cast.

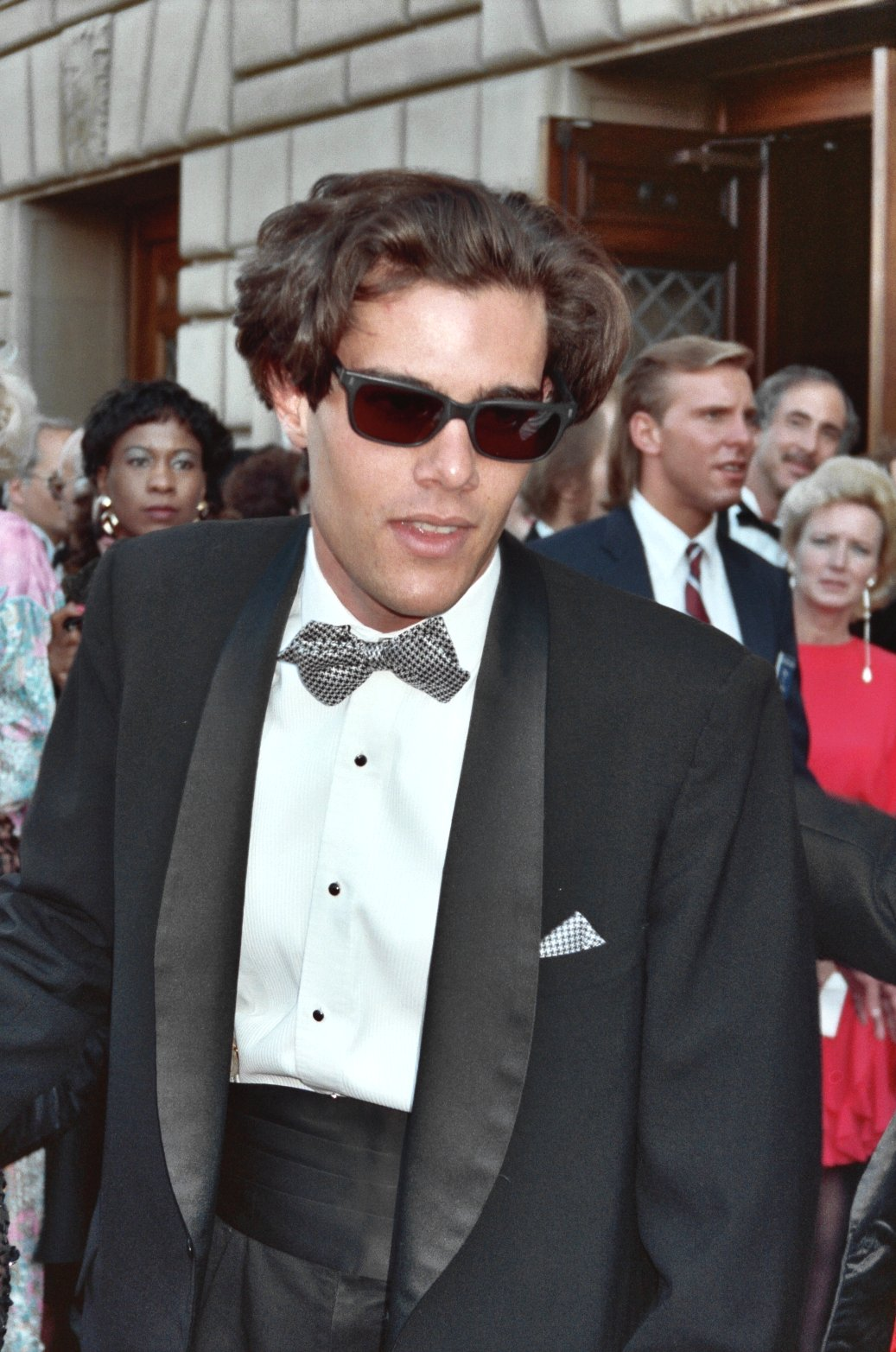
Ashbrook arriving at the 43rd Primetime Emmy Awards in August 1991.

In 1989, Ashbrook portrayed Joey in She's Out of Control. From 1990-1991, Ashbrook played Bobby Briggs on the cult TV series Twin Peaks. While starring on Twin Peaks, Ashbrook appeared in the films Sundown: The Vampire in Retreat (1990), Ghost Dad (1990), Girlfriend from Hell (1990), and The Willies (1990) as well as on an episode of the television series The Hidden Room.

In 1992, Ashbrook reprised his role as Bobby Briggs in the prequel film Twin Peaks: Fire Walk with Me and portrayed Clyde Barrow in the television film Bonnie & Clyde: The True Story alongside Tracey Needham. In 1994, Ashbrook appeared in the short film The Coriolis Effect (alongside Jennifer Rubin and Quentin Tarantino) and in the film Cityscrapes: Los Angeles. He acted in the 1995 science fiction television pilot W.E.I.R.D. World, written and produced by the makers of the Tales from the Crypt series.

In 1995, Ashbrook starred in the film Comfortably Numb. In 1996, Ashbrook guest starred on the television series The Outer Limits. The following year, Ashbrook was cast as Gary McDermott on the short-lived television series Crisis Center. In 1998, he portrayed Seth in the film Interstate 5 and guest starred on the television series Welcome to Paradox.

Ashbrook has appeared on The WB's Charmed in the 2001 episode "Just Harried", on NBC's The Pretender in the 2000 episode "Rules of Engagement", on The Outer Limits in the 1996 episode "Resurrection", and on Law & Order: Special Victims Unit in the 2007 episode "Haystack". Ashbook played the recurring role of Rich Rinaldi on the television series Dawson's Creek (2002–2003). In 2009, Ashbrook joined the cast of the series Crash for the regular part of Jimmy. In 2010, he reunited with some of the cast of Twin Peaks on the comedy-tribute episode of Psych, titled "Dual Spires". In 2012, Ashbrook starred alongside Ray Wise and Derek Mears in the Steven C. Miller psycho-thriller The Aggression Scale. In 2014, he appeared in the werewolf horror film Late Phases.

In 2017, Ashbrook reprised his role as Bobby Briggs in David Lynch's revival series Twin Peaks: The Return.

== Filmography ==
=== Film ===
Year	Title	Role	Notes
1978	Attack of the Killer Tomatoes	Boy on Boat	Uncredited
1988	Return of the Living Dead Part II	Tom Essex	
1988	Waxwork	Tony	
1989	She's Out of Control	Joey	
1990	Sundown: The Vampire in Retreat	Jack	
1990	Ghost Dad	Tony Ricker	
1990	Girlfriend from Hell	Chaser	
1991	The Willies	Tough Dude	
1992	Twin Peaks: Fire Walk with Me	Bobby Briggs	
1994	Cityscrapes: Los Angeles	Hipster	
1994	The Coriolis Effect	Ray	Short film
1995	Comfortably Numb	William Best	
1998	Interstate 5	Seth	
1999	Blink of an Eye	Mikey	
2001	Puzzled	Ryan	
2001	Angels Don't Sleep Here	Michael / Jessie Daniels	
2002	The Last Place on Earth	Rob Baskin	
2002	New Alcatraz	Kelly Mitich	
2005	Inner Balance	Mike	Short film
2010	Darkmatter	Rogaski	Short film
2011	Lightweight	Rich	Short film
2012	The Aggression Scale	Lloyd	
2014	Late Phases	Westmark	
2014	The Opposite Sex	Gary	
2016	Hitler's Folly	Josh	
2017	Kensho at the Bedfellow	Scott	
2017	Getting Grace	Ron	
2017	Restraint	Jeff Burroughs	
2019	Framing John DeLorean	Ben Tisa	
2019	Ice Cream in the Cupboard	Pat	
2020	Minor Premise	Malcolm	
2022	Please Baby Please	Cal	
TBA	Unplugged	Gary / Jerome	Voice; In production

=== Television ===
Year	Title	Role	Notes
1986	Cagney & Lacey	Kevin Slade	Episode: "Capitalism"
1987	Knots Landing	Teen	2 episodes
1987	ABC Afterschool Special	Brian	Episode: "Just a Regular Kid: An AIDS Story"
1988	21 Jump Street	Mark Stevens	Episode: "Whose Choice Is It Anyway?"
1990–1991	Twin Peaks	Bobby Briggs	27 episodes
1991	The Hidden Room	Matt	Episode: "Taking Back the Night"
1992	Bonnie & Clyde: The True Story	Clyde Barrow	Television film
1993	Desperate Journey: The Allison Wilcox Story	Marc	Television film
1994	Golden Gate	Rudi Venera	Television film
1995	W.E.I.R.D. World	Dylan Bledsoe	Television film
1996	The Outer Limits	Cain	Episode: "Resurrection"
1997	Crisis Center	Off. Gary McDermott	6 episodes
1998	Welcome to Paradox	Marshal Stu Clemens	Episode: "Into the Shop"
2000	The Pretender	Cam Larsen	Episode: "Rules of Engagement"
2001	Jack & Jill	Frank	Episode: "What Weddings Do to People"
2001	Charmed	T.J.	Episode: "Just Harried"
2002	Python II	Dwight Stoddard	Television film
2002–2003	Dawson's Creek	Rich Rinaldi	9 episodes
2004	The Division	Carl	Episode: "It's the Real Thing"
2006	Deadwood	Hearst Goon	Episode: "Tell Him Something Pretty"
2007	Law & Order: Special Victims Unit	Paddy Kendall	Episode: "Haystack"
2007	The Kill Point	Tony	7 episodes
2009	Crash	Jimmy	12 episodes
2010, 2014	Psych	Bob Barker / Jackson Hale	Episodes: "Dual Spires", "Remake A.K.A. Cloudy... With a Chance of Improvement"
2011	White Collar	Thomas Carlisle	Episode: "Scott Free"
2013	Blue Bloods	Tommy Banks	Episode: "Ends and Means"
2013	Hostages	Victor	2 episodes
2017	Rosewood	Jeff Groves	Episode: "Calliphoridae & Country Roads"
2017	Chicago P.D.	Mark Scalise	Episode: "Grasping for Salvation"
2017	Twin Peaks	Deputy Bobby Briggs	7 episodes
2018	The Resident	Kevin Fell	Episode: "Run, Doctor, Run"
2019	Insatiable	Gordy Greer	2 episodes
2025	High Potential	Morris Jardine	Episode: "Obsessed"
