= Reunion (2001 film) =

2001 American film using the Dogme 95 constraints directed by Leif Tilden

- Directed by: Leif Tilden; Mark Poggi
- Written by: Kimberly Shane O'Hara; Eric M. Klein
- Produced by: Kimberly Shane O'Hara; Eric M. Klein
- Starring: Billy Wirth; Jennifer Rubin; Corey Glover
- Distributed by: FilmMates Entertainment
- Release date: 2001
- Running time: 94 minutes
- Country: United States
- Language: English

Reunion, also known as American Reunion, is a 2001 American film directed by Leif Tilden and Mark Poggi using the filmmaking techniques of Dogme 95 style. It stars Billy Wirth and Jennifer Rubin in a bittersweet tale about six former classmates gathering 24 hours before their 20th high school reunion. Reunion is listed as the 17th film to conform to the minimalist tenets of the Danish avant-garde school of Dogme.

== Selected Cast ==
- Billy Wirth as Brad
- Jennifer Rubin as Jeanie
- Corey Glover as Ty
- Marlene Forte as Margaret
- Rainer Judd as Mindy
- Dwier Brown as Patrick
- Andres Faucher as J.C.
- Steven Gilborn as George
- Georgia Simon as Georgina
- Rod Britt as Mr. Andretti
- Dan Gunther as Kile
- Michael James Johnson as Michael

== Reception ==
On the review aggregator website Rotten Tomatoes, 55% of 11 critics' reviews are positive, with an average rating of 5.6/10. Edward Guthmann of the San Francisco Chronicle gave the film a negative review, finding it to pale in comparison to other films of the Dogme 95 movement, writing: "The essence of Dogma is the stripping away of slick, external factors to produce an emotional rawness. "Reunion," filmed in California, has nothing to strip down to: instead of exposing the truth, it exposes incompetence and the emptiness of the script."
