= The Last Place on Earth (film) =

- Directed by: James Slocum
- Written by: James Slocum
- Produced by: Gina Meyers; Barrie M. Osborne
- Starring: Tisha Campbell; Dana Ashbrook; Mitchell Anderson; Thom Bierdz; Matt Farnsworth
- Cinematography: David DeChant
- Edited by: Frederick Wardell; Folmer Wiesinger
- Music by: Eric Swanson
- Production companies: Boss Entertainment; Panorama Entertainment; Renaissance Media Productions
- Release date: 1 January 2002
- Running time: 88 minutes
- Country: United States
- Language: English

The Last Place on Earth is a 2002 American drama film directed by James Slocum, starring Tisha Campbell and Dana Ashbrook.

== Cast ==
- Tisha Campbell as Ann Field
- Dana Ashbrook as Rob Baskin
- Mitchell Anderson as Ken
- Thom Bierdz as Rich
- Matt Farnsworth as Mark
- Phyllis Diller as Mrs. Baskin
- Brock Peters as Jack Field
- Mink Stole as Support Group Leader
- Billy Dee Williams as Dr. Davis
- Edward Beimfohr as Dr. Moore
- B. Wyatt as Bill Baskin
- Anita Finlay as Kelly Baskin
- Richard Gross as Dick Mossbacher
- Alison Arngrim as Party Toast
- Mark Consuelos as Party Toast
- William Frederick Knight as Support Group
- Jack Ong as Support Group

== Reception ==
TV Guide called the film "satisfyingly sentimental" and wrote that the cast "keeps the weepy sentimentality in check." Kevin Thomas of the Los Angeles Times wrote that the Campbell and Ashbrook are "entirely winning in a picture wise enough to acknowledge that true love never runs smoothly." Dan Lybarger of The Kansas City Star called the film a "noble attempt" and praised the cinematography, writing that "If the people strolling through the landscape were half as interesting, this would have made a great movie."

Robert K. Elder of the Chicago Tribune wrote that the film has "too much going on, with too little focus." Robert Koehler of Variety criticised the "contrived" and "confused" third act, the use of cliches, the "weak" supporting performances and the lack of chemistry between Campbell and Ashbrook. The Sarasota Herald-Tribune gave the film a rating of "D+" and called the film a "false and utterly forced love story that either tries way too hard or way too little."
