= By the Sword (film) =

1991 film by Jeremy Kagan

- Promotional Poster
- Directed by: Jeremy Paul Kagan
- Written by: John McDonald; James Donadio
- Produced by: Marlon Staggs; Peter E. Strauss
- Starring: F. Murray Abraham; Eric Roberts; Mia Sara; Chris Rydell
- Cinematography: Arthur Albert
- Edited by: David Holden
- Music by: Bill Conti
- Distributed by: Hansen Entertainment
- Release dates: October 4, 1991 (Canada); October 7, 1992 (France); May 14, 1993 (Chicago)
- Running time: 91 minutes
- Countries: United States; France
- Language: English
- Box office: $6,220

By the Sword is a 1991 sports action film starring F. Murray Abraham and Eric Roberts as world-class fencers. Directed by Jeremy Paul Kagan, this is the first feature film about fencing. Although some reviews of its 1993 U.S. theatrical release noted favorably the lead acting and action sequences, the screenplay was considered "terrible".

== Plot ==
Alexander Villard (Eric Roberts) is a former fencing champion who runs a highly competitive fencing school. One of his students describes him as "a freak who thinks he's living in the fourteenth century".

Max Suba (F. Murray Abraham) is an ex-convict who introduces himself as a fencing instructor. Villard initially gives him a job as a janitor. Over time Suba recovers his lost form. Villard has Suba spar with an ambitious student to demonstrate a point. Villard is "arrogant but not unkind", and eventually gives Suba a chance to teach, assigning him the beginning students.

Villard takes a ruthless approach to the art, encouraging a student to injure an opponent to win; by contrast Suba's attitude is subtler, encouraging students to turn their own weaknesses into strengths. Following this advice, one of Suba's beginning level students scores against Villard's prize pupil during an in-school competition. Flashbacks further develop the conflict; Suba killed Villard's father in a fencing duel.

The film climaxes in a dramatic duel between Villard and Suba: they fight up and down the academy until Villard is finally defeated. In that defeat Villard learns humility: to be a master does not mean defeating every opponent or be the best. In the end they both acknowledge each other's skills and call each other Maestro.

== Cast ==
- F. Murray Abraham as Suba
- Eric Roberts as Villard
- Mia Sara as Erin Clavelli
- Christopher Rydell as Jim Trebor
- Elaine Kagan as Rachel, Suba's Romantic Interest
- Brett Cullen as Danny Gallagher

Other students are played by Doug Wert and Stephen Polk. In her second film appearance, Eve Kagan plays Gallagher's daughter. (Her first appearance had been in 1989, in a film also directed by Kagan.)

== Soundtrack ==
Bill Conti composed the score. The score was performed and recorded by classical guitarist Angel Romero.

== Release ==
By the Sword was shown at the Vancouver International Film Festival in October 1991. It subsequently appeared at the American Film Market in Santa Monica in late October of the same year, and at the Palm Springs International Film Festival in January 1992. It was released in France under the title "Par l'épée" on October 7, 1992.

In the US, the film opened in Chicago on May 14, 1993; in Los Angeles on September 24, 1993; and in New York City on October 22, 1993. The film's cinematic poster was created by John Alvin, who was known for his work on the posters for Blazing Saddles and E.T. the Extra-Terrestrial, among others.

The film was released on VHS in 1994 as a Columbia TriStar home video.

== Reception ==
=== Box office ===
According to Box Office Mojo, in its September run the film was shown in nine theaters and grossed $6,220.

=== Critical ===
The film has received mixed reviews, with the most consistent point noted in review is poor screenplay and directing. Roger Ebert says "the movie adds some supporting characters in order to show us things about fencing that we didn't know", but another reviewer finds the minor characters "unnecessary" and "thinly drawn", so "the film suffers whenever the plot focuses on them". Although Chicago Reader critic Jonathan Rosenbaum says the film "suffers from overdone, mannerist performances by the two leads", another reviewer says "the key to this film resides in the performances by Eric Roberts and F. Murray Abraham". The film develops Suba's character in particular, revealing a past that "he seems unable to completely let go of." Ebert says of the lead actors: "they create characters much more interesting and dimensional than this thin screenplay really requires."

New York Times critic Vincent Canby calls the screenplay "nonsense", saying bluntly: "the screenplay is terrible, full of unfinished subplots and lines that appear to announce its essential aimlessness." Regarding one of the more important subplots, a critic wrote: "Sadly, Kagan a routine television and film director adds nothing to the intriguing notion of a man who's spent half his life in prison returning to the scene of his crime."

Although one critic calls the many flashbacks "a further directorial flourish", they are still at best an "interesting idea that isn't really successfully pulled off." While the action sequences are "well handled", Canby says "the drama is fraught with anticlimax." Overall, the plot is full of "sports clichés", could "as well have been about croquet", and is "a little too neat and obvious to really carry the material." One review says: "Right down to the painful fencing-to-disco-music routine, this is embarrassingly fab."
