= Juan Fernández de Alarcón =

Dominican actor

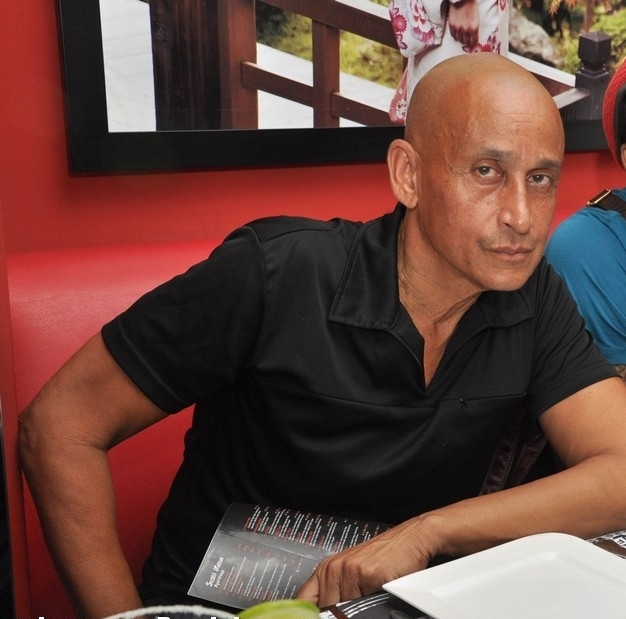
- Juan Fernández
- Born: Juan de Jesús Fernández de Alarcón; December 13, 1956 (age 69); Santo Domingo, Dominican Republic
- Occupation: Actor
- Years active: 1972–present

Juan de Jesús Fernández de Alarcón (born December 13, 1956) is a Dominican actor best known for playing antagonist roles in movies.

Fernández was born in Santo Domingo, Dominican Republic. He made his movie debut in Salome and has gone to star in over 30 movies.

== Filmography ==
=== Films ===
Year	Title	Role	Notes
1972	Salomè		first film role
1983	Uncommon Valor	Orderly	
1984	Fear City / Border / Ripper	Jorge	
1986	Salvador	Army Lieutenant	
1988	Wildfire	Man In Cantina	
1988	Bulletproof	Pantaro	
1988	Crocodile Dundee II	Miguel	
1989	Kinjite: Forbidden Subjects	"Duke"	
1989	Cat Chaser	Rafi	
1989	L.A. Takedown / Crimewave (USA) / L.A. Crimewave / Made in L.A	Harvey Torena	
1990	Extralarge: Moving Target	Rashid	
1990	A Show of Force	Captain Correa	
1990	Arachnophobia	Miguel Higueras	Cameo (uncredited)
1991	Liquid Dreams	Juno	
1992	Aces: Iron Eagle III	Escovez	
1992	Nails	Victor Menandez	
1993	Fire on the Amazon / Lost Paradise	Ataninde	
1993	Fugitive Nights	Bino Sierra	
1993	Necronomicon	Attendant (wraparound)	
1994	The Dangerous / Divine Wind (USA)	Tito	
1994	Saints and Sinners	Priest	
1994	Silent Fury		
1996	Cheyenne	Vargas	
1996	Executive Decision	London Bomber	
1996	Mad Dog Time / Trigger Happy (UK)	Davis	
1997	Dead Tides	Juan Carlos	
1998	Doña Bárbara	Melquiades	
2000	Slice & Dice / Bite	Luiz	
2001	Entre los dioses del desprecio		
2003	A Man Apart	Mateo Santos	
2003	In Hell	Shubka 2005 "The Lost City"	
2007	Otis E.	Bar Owner	
2009	Los Bandoleros	Elvis	Credited as Juan Fernande
2009	The Collector	The Man / The Collector	
2010	Trópico de Sangre	Rafael Trujillo	

=== Television ===
Year	Title	Role	Notes
1988	Miami Vice	Martillo Borrasca	Episode: "Borrasca" (s5, e5)
1998	Beverly Hills, 90210	Fernando Caldero	Episode: "Aloha Beverly Hills" (S8, e1)
