= Bonnie & Clyde: The True Story =

- Genre: Drama
- Written by: Gary Hoffman
- Directed by: Gary Hoffman
- Starring: Tracey Needham; Dana Ashbrook
- Country of origin: United States
- Original language: English

Production
- Executive producers: Gary Hoffman; Neal Israel
- Producer: Ooty Moorehead
- Production location: Texas
- Cinematography: Rohn Schmidt
- Editor: Kevin Krasny
- Running time: 93 minutes
- Production companies: 20th Century Fox Television; FNM Films; Gary Hoffman/Neal Israel Productions; Neal and Gary Productions

Original release
- Network: Fox
- Release: August 17, 1992

Bonnie & Clyde: The True Story is a 1992 American television film written and directed by Gary Hoffman. It stars Dana Ashbrook and Tracey Needham as Bonnie and Clyde. The 93-minute television film was shot on location at historic crime scenes associated with the couple in East Texas. The film premiered on Fox on August 17, 1992.

== Premise ==
Bonnie Parker is estranged from her husband while still only just barely eighteen. Clyde Barrow, a handsome charmer who is in love with Bonnie, is a small-time thief, 'borrowing' cars to teach Bonnie to drive. He falls in with W.D. Jones, and their crime levels quickly rise. Soon Bonnie is dragged in with them, due to her love for Clyde, and within a short space of time, everyone is baying for the blood of Bonnie and Clyde.

== Cast ==
- Tracey Needham as Bonnie Parker
- Dana Ashbrook as Clyde Barrow
- Doug Savant as Deputy Sheriff Ted Hinton
- Billy Morrissette as W.D. Jones
- Michael Bowen as Buck Barrow
- Libby Villari as Mrs. Pritchard

== Reception ==
Tony Scott of Variety said that this version "concentrates on the pair's supposed innocence and sensitivity; program is surprisingly effective." When they begin traveling together, Bonnie is a teenager and Clyde is 20 years old. Scott says the chief fault of this version is "in turning the sleazy Bonnie and Clyde into a pair of sympathetic characters."
