= L.A. Takedown =

1989 television film directed by Michael Mann

- VHS cover art
- Genre: Crime action
- Written by: Michael Mann
- Directed by: Michael Mann
- Starring: Scott Plank; Michael Rooker; Ely Pouget; Vincent Guastaferro; Richard Chaves; Victor Rivers
- Music by: Tim Truman
- Country of origin: United States
- Original language: English

Production
- Executive producer: Michael Mann
- Producer: Patrick Markey
- Cinematography: Ronald Víctor García
- Editor: Dov Hoenig
- Running time: 92 minutes
- Production companies: Ajar Inc.; Compañía Iberoamericana de TV; Movies Film Productions; World International Network

Original release
- Network: NBC
- Release: August 27, 1989

L.A. Takedown, also called L.A. Crimewave and Made in L.A., is a 1989 American crime action television film written and directed by Michael Mann. Originally filmed as a pilot for an NBC television series, the project was reworked and aired as a stand-alone film after the series was not picked up. The film was later released on VHS and, in Region 2, on DVD. It is the basis for Mann's 1995 film Heat.

The ensemble cast includes Scott Plank, Alex McArthur, Michael Rooker, Daniel Baldwin, and Xander Berkeley. Plank starred as Vincent Hanna, a detective on the hunt for professional criminal Patrick McLaren, played by McArthur; the story was based on the real-life investigation of Chicago criminal Neil McCauley.

== Plot ==
Los Angeles robbery-homicide sergeant Vincent Hanna is on the trail of a gang of ruthless professional criminals, led by the methodical Patrick McLaren, whose only mistake in the last heist was the killing of armored car guards by the new recruit, Waingro, who is a loose cannon. But Hanna is soon surprised when he discovers that he and McLaren have quite a lot in common. While McLaren and his gang plan another heist, Hanna and his colleagues keep surveillance. Hanna is facing a personal problem, as the police work is straining his relationship with his wife, Lillian. Moreover, McLaren is also facing a similar problem when he finds himself falling in love with Eady, which he condemns due to the commitment required to his profession.

Things then take a turn for the worse, as McLaren unsuccessfully attempts to kill Waingro, who in turn betrays the team to the police. When Hanna arrives on the scene unexpectedly with the police, McLaren and his crew engage them in a mid-street shootout, in which most of McLaren's crew are killed. After making an unlikely escape, McLaren is presented with an opportunity to leave Los Angeles for a new life with Eady, but he decides to first take revenge for Waingro's betrayal. After McLaren tracks down Waingro to a hotel room, he is ambushed by Hanna and his team. Waingro takes advantage of the confusion to shoot McLaren through a closed door. While Hanna advises Waingro of his options in jail, for a string of previous murders, Waingro resists arrest and tries to pull a gun. In self-defense, Hanna forces Waingro through a hotel window, and Waingro falls fifteen floors to his death. In the final sequences, Hanna is reunited with his wife.

== Cast ==
- Scott Plank as Vincent Hanna, sergeant of detectives working for the Los Angeles Police Department Robbery-Homicide division
- Alex McArthur as Patrick McLaren, professional robber, head of his own gang of criminals
- Michael Rooker as Detective Bosko, Hanna's second-in-command
- Ely Pouget as Lillian Hanna, Vincent Hanna's estranged wife
- Vincent Guastaferro as Michael Cerrito
- Victor Rivers as Detective Arriaga
- Richard Chaves as Detective Lou Casals
- Laura Harrington as Eady, McLaren's love interest
- Peter Dobson as Chris Sheherlis
- Xander Berkeley as Waingro, a new recruit to McLaren's gang
- Daniel Baldwin as Detective Bobby Schwartz
- R.D. Call as Harry Dieter
- Robert Winley as Nate
- Juan Fernández as Harvey Torena
- Clarence Gilyard Jr. as Mustafa Breedan
- Cary-Hiroyuki Tagawa as Hugh Benny

The majority of the main cast appeared as guest stars in episodes of one or both of Michael Mann's two shows produced in the 1980s, Miami Vice and Crime Story.

== Background and production ==
The origins of L.A. Takedown lay in real life. Michael Mann, the film's producer and screenwriter, cited producer, screenwriter and Chicago ex-police officer Chuck Adamson as an inspiration for the character of Vincent Hanna. Mann, who collaborated with Adamson on Miami Vice and Crime Story and several minor projects, was told of an investigation Adamson partook in. In 1963, he was investigating Neil McCauley, a professional robber. According to Mann, "one day they simply bumped into one another. [Adamson] didn't know what to do: arrest him, shoot him or have a cup of coffee." Adamson later killed McCauley in a stand-off after a failed robbery.

In 1979, Mann wrote an early 180-page draft for the screenplay. After making his first feature film, Thief, he re-wrote the draft. In a 1983 interview, he mentioned he was planning to make a film based on the draft and was looking for someone to direct it. He later offered the director position to Walter Hill, but Hill refused. In the late 1980s, NBC commissioned Mann to produce a new television series. Mann felt the draft would make a good pilot episode, but decided to set the story in Los Angeles, deeming the L. A. Robbery–Homicide Division a better basis for a TV show. He took the 180-page screenplay and edited out roughly 110 pages to make room for a 90-minute pilot. However, the new series was not picked up by the network. Instead, it was released as a television film entitled L.A. Takedown.

The pilot was shot in nineteen days, with ten days of pre-production, which was described as atypically fast for Mann. The film score was written by Tim Truman, and cinematography done by Ron Garcia. The soundtrack also featured the song "L.A. Woman" performed by Billy Idol.

== Release and reception ==
Mann had cast Scott Plank in the role of Hanna, which was not well received by NBC. They expressed interest in buying the series on the condition of finding a new lead actor, but Mann refused, leading to NBC's rejecting the show. The unsuccessful pilot was, however, aired as a television film on NBC on August 27, 1989, at 9:00 pm. In 1990, it was released on VHS in Finland, with several other European countries following in the early 1990s. On March 19, 2008, a DVD of the movie was released in Germany, featuring several scene selections as bonus content.

L.A. Takedown received mixed-to-positive reviews from film critics, with its acting being the most poorly received. On its first airing, The Globe and Mail gave the film a two star rating. Hal Erickson of AllRovi compared the film to Mann's cult TV series Miami Vice, but felt it emphasized style over substance. Dragan Antulov for Movie Reviews in Croatian (Croatian: Filmske recenzije na hrvatskom), in comparing the film with its remake, Heat, praised Mann's choice to hire unknown actors for L.A. Takedown, which contrasted with big stars in Heat. Although he derided Berkeley's performance as Waingro, he concluded that it was "a fine companion piece to Heat." A reviewer from Lexikon des Internationalen Films of Germany was less enthusiastic, citing routine action sequences and a confusing plot due to the overly large cast. Lol Frost of Empire gave L.A. Takedown two out of five stars, acknowledging the worthiness of the plot, but citing lack of Mann's typical filming style. Frost concluded that the film was "a bit of a dud, but a noble effort." In another retrospective review, Radio Times unfavorably compared the television film to Heat.

== Remake ==
After directing The Last of the Mohicans, Mann decided to remake L.A. Takedown into a wide release cinema feature. He viewed the film as a dry run for the original story, which was a complex, multi-layered crime drama edited out of the script for the television film. He consulted a longer 1986 draft to work on the remake. Having made L.A. Takedown, Mann felt he had a much better idea of how he wanted to structure the remake, saying: "I charted the film out like a 2 hr 45 min piece of music, so I'd know where to be smooth, where not to be smooth, where to be staccato, where to use a pulse like a heartbeat."

On April 5, 1994, Mann was reported to have abandoned an earlier plan to produce a James Dean biographical film in favor of the L.A. Takedown remake, entitled Heat. Heat was made on a US$60 million budget and released in 1995. It featured Al Pacino as Vincent Hanna, Robert De Niro in the role of Patrick McLaren, now renamed Neil McCauley, Val Kilmer as Chris Sheherlis (spelled Shiherlis), Mykelti Williamson as Arriaga, now renamed Drucker, Diane Venora in the role of Lillian, now renamed Justine, and Ted Levine as Schwartz, now renamed Bosko. Xander Berkeley, who played Waingro in L.A. Takedown, makes a brief appearance in Heat as a man who has a one-night stand with Justine. The film was met with critical acclaim and grossed US$187 million, becoming a financial success.

Featuring a bigger budget and well-known actors, Heat also had significant storyline differences when compared to L.A. Takedown. Among other things, the remake included the gambling addiction of Sheherlis/Shiherlis, the subplot concerning Roger Van Zant and his attempt to double-cross the crew (in this film Waingro plots against the crew by himself), and Hanna's troubled stepdaughter—plot elements not present in the original film. Because of this, Heat runs nearly twice the length of L.A. Takedown.
