= Stephen Shellen =

Canadian actor

- Born: June 17, 1957 (age 68); Victoria, British Columbia, Canada
- Occupation: Actor
- Years active: 1982–present

Stephen Shellen (born June 17, 1957), also known as Stephen Shellenberger, is a Canadian actor. He is probably best known for his role as Luke Brenner on the TV series Counterstrike, for his role as Neal in Robert Redford's A River Runs Through It, and for his voice acting in the video game Deus Ex: Human Revolution.

== Appearances ==
Film credits
Year	Title	Role	Notes
1982	Spring Fever	Andy	
1983	Your Place...or Mine		
1984	Amazons	Kevin	
1984	The Hitchhiker	Eric Dunlap	as Steve Shellen
1984	Gimme an 'F'	Tommy Hamilton	
1984	A Touch of Scandal	Billy Podovsky	
1985	Hollywood Wives	Randy	
1985	HeartBeat	Nick	
1985	A Letter to Three Wives	Nicky	Remake
1985	Behind Enemy Lines	Lt. David Holland	
1986	Alfred Hitchcock Presents	Garson	
1986	Modern Girls	Brad	as Steve Shellen
1987	The Stepfather	Jim Ogilvie	
1987	Burglar	Christopher Marshall	as Steve Shellen
1987	Cameo by Night	Larry Willard	
1987	Talking Walls	Paul	
1988	American Gothic	Paul	
1988	Casual Sex?	Nick	
1988	Murder One	Wayne Coleman	
1989	Damned River	Ray	
1989	Tales from the Crypt	Charles	
1989	CBS Summer Playhouse	Eli	
1989	Booker	Bill Bludworth	
1990	21 Jump Street	Martin Wolf	
1990	Still Life: The Fine Art of Murder	Teddy Bullock	
1990	Drop Dead Gorgeous	Shelby Voit	
1990–1991	Counterstrike	Luke Brenner	
1992	A River Runs Through It	Neal Burns	
1992	The Bodyguard	Tom Winston	
1992	North of 60	Al Bishop	
1993	Stand Off	David Maltby	
1994	Model by Day	Lt. Eddie Walker	
1994	Greyhounds	Evan Long	
1994	RoboCop: The Series	Conrad Brock	
1994	Law & Order	Steve Martell	
1994	Due South	Eddie Beets	
1995	The Outer Limits	Wayne Haas	Episode: "Living Hell"
1995	Rude	Yankee	
1995	Dr. Jekyll and Ms. Hyde	Larry	
1995	Deceptions II: Edge of Deception	Lieutenant Nick Gentry	
1995	The Wrong Woman	Tom Henley	
1996	Reckoning	Yank	
1996	Rolling Thunder	Hack Rollins	
1997	Honeymoon	Newman	
1999	Vivid	Cole Purvis	
2000	Gone in 60 Seconds	Exotic Car Salesman	
1997–2000	La Femme Nikita	Marco O'Brien / Det. Marco O'Brien	
2001	Frozen with Fear	Jack Mize	
2002	Highway	Clark Hayes	
2005	Nature Unleashed: Tornado	Ernie	
2007	Race to Mars	Mission Controller (voice)	
2010	Territories	Rick Brautigan	
2011	Deus Ex: Human Revolution	David Sarif (voice)	Video game
2018	The Spark	Michael	
