= Libby Villari =

American actress

- Born: Margaret Elizabeth Webb; November 17, 1951 (age 74); North Carolina, U.S
- Occupation: Actress
- Years active: 1985–present
- Spouses: Louis Villari (m. 1968; div. 1997) Matt Barnes (m. 1997)
- Children: 1

Margaret Elizabeth "Libby" Villari (née Webb; born November 17, 1951) is an American actress. She is best known for her recurring role as Mayor Lucy Rodell on Friday Night Lights. Her film appearances include Boyhood, Infamous, What's Eating Gilbert Grape, Boys Don't Cry, and The Faculty.

== Personal life ==
Born Margaret Elizabeth Webb in North Carolina, she grew up in California, later moving to Texas. Her mother was Peggy Lee (née Walters; 1931–2004) and her father was Roy Frank Webb (1924–1973). She graduated from University of North Texas with a B.A in Theatre. An active performer in the Texas theatre community, she often acts in productions that film in Texas. She is a breast cancer survivor. She has a son named Lyn William Villari and 2 grandchildren.

== Career ==
Villari made her television debut in the 1985 television movie Stormin' Home and followed this with Adam: His Song Continues and the Emmy-nominated television film Little Girl List with Tess Harper. In 1986 she played Mrs. Pritchard in Bonnie & Clyde: The True Story. She made her film debut in 1993 as Camille McCloud in My Boyfriend's Back, also (Matthew McConaughey's first film). She next appeared in Flesh and Bone, as a reporter in Clint Eastwood's A Perfect World, and in the 1994 television film Without Consent.

In 1995, she appeared in The Big Green and in 1996 in Children of the Corn IV: The Gathering and The Whole Wide World as the mother of Renée Zellweger. She has also appeared on the series Walker, Texas Ranger and in Robert Altman's Dr. T & the Women.

In 2014, Villari's film Boyhood by Richard Linklater opened at the Sundance Film Festival. She plays the mother of Patricia Arquette's character in the film. It was nominated for 6 Oscars including Best Picture at the 87th Academy Awards.

On stage she has acted in several productions with the Stage West Theatre Company, including her breakout role as Honey Bruce in Lenny, and with the Hip Pocket Theatre, including Widows by Ariel Dorfman. Since 2017 she has toured regional theaters around the country portraying former Texas governor Ann Richards in the one-woman play ANN by Holland Taylor. Villari is also an acting coach and works with children's literacy programs.

== Filmography ==
=== Film ===
Year	Title	Role	Notes
1992	Bonnie & Clyde: The True Story	Mrs. Pritchard	
1993	My Boyfriend's Back	Camille McCloud	
1993	What's Eating Gilbert Grape	Waitress	
1993	Flesh and Bone	Waitress	
1993	A Perfect World	Reporter	
1995	The Big Green	Brenda Neilson	
1996	The Whole Wide World	Etna Reed Price	
1996	Children of the Corn: The Gathering	Michael's Mom	
1998	The Faculty	Mrs. Connor	
1999	Boys Don't Cry	Nurse	
2000	Dr. T & the Women	Dr. T's Patient	
2002	Serving Sara	Cowgirl Waitress	
2004	The Beautiful Country	Steve's ex-wife	
2005	Hate Crime	Shirley	
2005	The King	Home Ec Teacher	
2006	Infamous	Delores Hope	
2007	Living & Dying	Miriam	
2013	Cry	Elizabeth	
2014	Boyhood	Catherine	
2014	Two Step	Marci	
2015	Ratpocalypse	Raisa Volkov	
2016	Occupy, Texas	Mrs. Martin	
2017	Windsor	Louise	
2017	Fetish	Libby	
2020	Yellow Rose	Jolene	

=== Television ===
Year	Title	Role	Notes
1985	Stormin' Home	Waitress	TV film
1986	Adam: His Song Continues	Nancy Jazvac	TV film
1988	Little Girl Lost	Harriet Baker	TV film
1993	Walker, Texas Ranger	Connie	"She'll Do to Ride the River With"
1994	Without Consent	Psych Tech	TV film
1997	Walker, Texas Ranger	Betty	"Sons of Thunder"
1998	Still Holding On: The Legend of Cadillac Jack	Honky Tonk Waitress	TV film
1999	A Face to Kill For	Loretta	TV film
2000	At Any Cost		TV film
2006-10	Friday Night Lights	Mayor Lucy Rodell	Recurring role
2010	Zola Levitt Presents the Dark Prince	Margaret	"Passages"
2010	Chase	Jan Boyle	"Pilot"
2014	Returning to Ananda	Nancy Evans	TV film
2015	Grey's Anatomy	Mrs. Gibson	"When I Grow Up"
