= Jennifer Rubin (actress) =

American actress (born 1962)

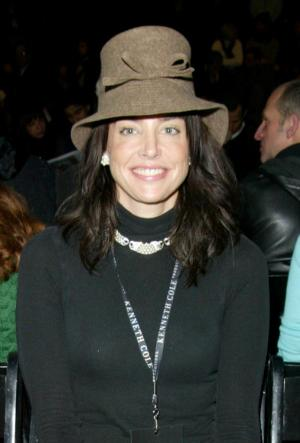
- Born: Jennifer Collene Rubin; April 3, 1962 (age 64); Phoenix, Arizona, U.S.
- Occupations: Actress, model
- Years active: 1980s–present
- Spouse: Elias Koteas (m. 1987; div. 1990)

Jennifer Collene Rubin (born April 3, 1962) is an American actress. Her first major role was Taryn White in the 1987 horror film A Nightmare on Elm Street 3: Dream Warriors and has since starred in a variety of films including Andrew Fleming's Bad Dreams (1988), Marisa Silver's Permanent Record (1988), Oliver Stone's The Doors (1991), Alan Shapiro's The Crush (1993), Louis Venosta's The Coriolis Effect (1994), Christian Duguay's Screamers (1995), and the 2001 Dogme 95 inspired film Reunion. Outside of film, Rubin has guest starred on a variety of television series such as The Twilight Zone (1987) and Tales from the Crypt (1992). In 2010, Rubin appeared as herself in the documentary Never Sleep Again: The Elm Street Legacy and has since worked as a writer, producer and director on her original screenplays.

== Early life, family and education ==
Rubin was born on April 3, 1962. She was raised in Phoenix, Arizona and spent extended time in an incubator in the hospital's neonatal unit. Her father was a pharmacist, and by age 21, her mother had four children. Jennifer's parents divorced when she was very young, and her mother remarried during her childhood. She has a brother and sisters; one of the sisters has multiple sclerosis. She has spoken of having learning disabilities, including mild autism. She was a competitive swimmer as a youth.

Rubin graduated from Thunderbird High School. Following her longtime boyfriend, she attended the University of Arizona, nearly failing her classes, where she entered a modeling competition on the university's campus.

== Career ==
Rubin abandoned college, relocating to New York City to pursue modeling full-time, signing with the Ford Modeling Agency. In 1984, she was named the Ford International Model of the Year. She also signed with Wilhelmina Models. She was the original model for Calvin Klein Obsession ads. Beyond New York, she modeled in Paris, was in cosmetics campaigns in Japan and the Philippines, and was featured in photographs in Harper's Bazaar and Vogue.

Following Phoebe Cates' transition from modeling to acting, Rubin decided to pursue roles. Her first major acting role was as Taryn White in the 1987 fantasy horror film A Nightmare on Elm Street 3: Dream Warriors, which earned over $44 million at the American box office. She later guest starred on an episode of the television series The Twilight Zone as Amy Hawkline. In 1988, Rubin starred in the horror film Bad Dreams, the drama film Permanent Record and the coming of age film Blueberry Hill. The following year, Rubin portrayed Claire in an episode of the television series Miami Vice. In 1990, Rubin starred in the comedy film Too Much Sun.

In 1991, she portrayed socialite Edie Sedgwick in Oliver Stone's biopic The Doors. In preparing for the role, Rubin met with Bob Dylan, who had had a relationship with Sedgwick. The same year, Rubin starred in the crime drama Delusion and the television film Drop Dead Gorgeous. The following year, Rubin starred in the drama A Woman, Her Men, and Her Futon and the television film The Fear Inside, and she guest-starred on Tales from the Crypt. In 1993, Rubin portrayed Amy Maddik in the thriller The Crush opposite Alicia Silverstone and Cary Elwes, and she starred in Bitter Harvest and the television film Full Eclipse. In 1994, Rubin was cast in the films Saints and Sinners, Gospel According to Harry, Playmaker, Red Scorpion 2, and Stranger by Night. The same year, Rubin starred alongside Dana Ashbrook and Quentin Tarantino in the short film The Coriolis Effect. In 1995, Rubin starred in the horror film Screamers and the drama film Deceptions II: Edge of Deception.

Rubin produced — and starred in — the film Road Kill (1999). She portrayed the main character Janice Starlin in The Wasp Woman (1995). In 1997, she starred in the films Twists of Terror and Plump Fiction and guest starred on an episode of The Outer Limits. The same year, she portrayed Tina in the film Deal of a Lifetime.

Other roles include Sara in Bel-Air, Sharon Williams in Falcon Down, Dorothy Smith in Sanctimony, and Carla Nash in Fatal Conflict. In 2001, she portrayed Dr. Valdes in Cruel Game, Jeanie in Reunion, and Ione in Amazons and Gladiators. The same year, she starred in the television film Lawless: Beyond Justice. In 2006, Rubin starred in the television film Dreamweaver. In 2009, Rubin starred in the film Transmorphers: Fall of Man. The following year, Rubin appeared in the documentary Never Sleep Again: The Elm Street Legacy. In 2013, she starred in the television film Heebie Jeebies and was cast as Dr. Paula Bellman in the 2014 film Untold.

== In other media ==
Rubin was in Chris Isaak's music video for "Somebody's Crying" (1995) and Bruce Hornsby's music video for "Harbor Lights" (1993).

== Personal life ==
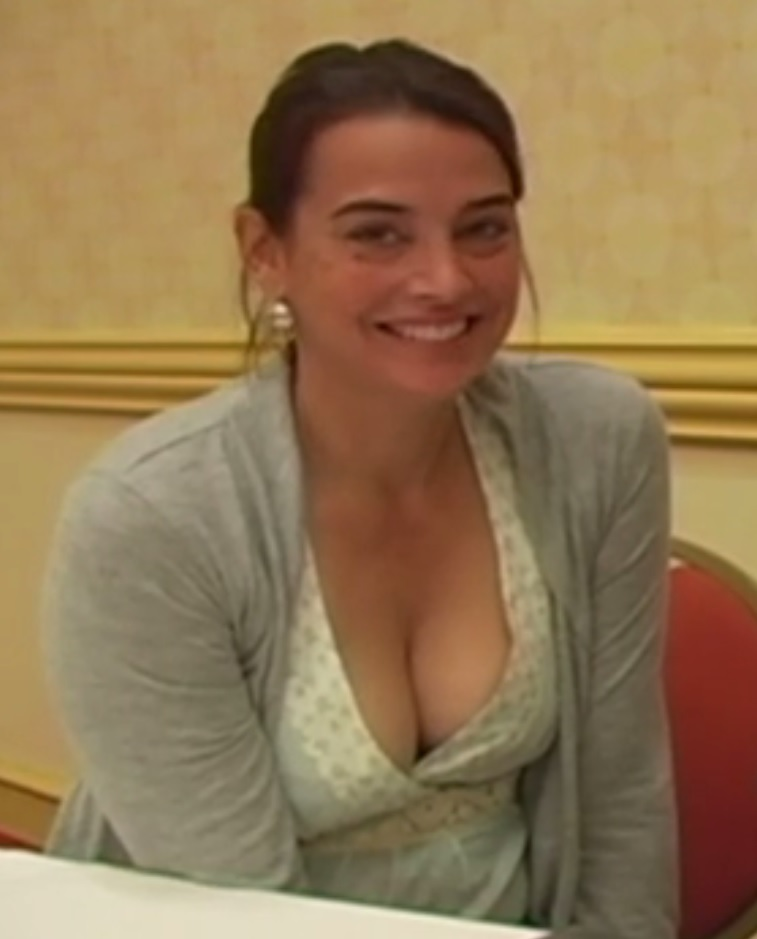
Rubin in 2010

Rubin married actor Elias Koteas in 1987. They divorced in 1990.

== Filmography ==
=== Film ===
Year	Title	Role	Notes
1987	A Nightmare on Elm Street 3: Dream Warriors	Taryn White	
1988	Bad Dreams	Cynthia	
1988	Permanent Record	Lauren	
1988	Blueberry Hill	Ellie Dane	
1990	Too Much Sun	Gracia	
1991	The Doors	Edie Sedgwick	
1991	Delusion	Patti	
1992	A Woman, Her Men, and Her Futon	Helen	
1993	The Crush	Amy Maddik	
1993	Bitter Harvest	Kelly Ann	
1994	The Coriolis Effect	Ruby	Short film
1994	Gospel According to Harry	Karen	
1994	Playmaker	Jamie Harris	
1994	Saints and Sinners	Eva	
1994	Deceptions II: Edge of Deception	Irene Stadler	
1994	Red Scorpion 2	Sam Guinness	
1994	Stranger by Night	Anne Richmond	
1995	The Wasp Woman	Janice	
1995	Screamers	Jessica Hanson Screamer	
1996	Little Witches	Sister Sherilyn	
1997	Loved	Debra Gill	
1997	Plump Fiction	Kandi Kane	
1997	Last Lives	Adrienne	
1997	Twists of Terror	Amy	
1999	Road Kill	Blue	
1999	Deal of a Lifetime	Tina	
2000	Bel Air	Sara	
2000	Sanctimony	Dorothy Smith	
2000	Fatal Conflict	Carla Nash	
2001	Reunion	Jeanie	
2001	Falcon Down	Sharon Williams	
2001	Amazons and Gladiators	Ione	
2002	Cruel Game	Dr. Valdes	
2009	Transmorphers: Fall of Man	Dr. Jo Summers	
2010	Never Sleep Again: The Elm Street Legacy	Herself	Documentary
2014	Untold	Dr. Paula Bellman	
2022	The Once and Future Smash	Herself	

=== Television ===
Year	Title	Role	Notes
1987	The Twilight Zone	Amy Hawkline	Episode: "Song of the Younger World/The Girl I Married"
1989	Miami Vice	Claire	Episode: "Leap of Faith"
1991	Drop Dead Gorgeous	Allie Holton	Television film
1992	Tales from the Crypt	Druscilla	Episode: "Beauty Rest"
1992	The Fear Inside	Jane Caswell	Television film
1993	Full Eclipse	Helen	Television film
1997	Twists of Terror	Amy	Television film
1997	The Outer Limits	Rose Ciotti	Episode: "Second Thoughts"
2001	Lawless: Beyond Justice	Lana Vitale	Television film
2006	Dreamweaver	Nighty Night	Television film
2013	Heebie Jeebies	Eva Moore	Television film
