= The Coriolis Effect =

- The four short film compilation release "Kisses in the Dark", including "The Coriolis Effect".
- Directed by: Louis Venosta
- Written by: Louis Venosta
- Produced by: Kathryn Arnold
- Starring: James Wilder; Jennifer Rubin; Dana Ashbrook; Corinne Bohrer
- Edited by: Luis Colina
- Music by: Hal Lindes
- Release date: March 26, 1994
- Running time: 33 minutes
- Country: United States
- Language: English

The Coriolis Effect is a 1994 short black-and-white film starring James Wilder, Jennifer Rubin, Dana Ashbrook and Corinne Bohrer, featuring a voice-only appearance from Quentin Tarantino. It was written and directed by Louis Venosta, and it was produced by Kathryn Arnold and Secondary Modern Motion Pictures.

== Background ==
The independent film was premiered in America at the New York New Directors/New Films Festival on March 26, 1994. It was the winning short film at the Venice Film Festival of 1994, where it won Venosta the Telepiù Award.

The film was released in America on both VHS and DVD via Vanguard Cinema. The release, Kisses in the Dark, compromises four independent award-winning short films: The Coriolis Effect, Solly's Diner, Looping and Joe. The artwork for the release highlighted The Coriolis Effect as the main film, with Rubin pictured on the front and both Rubin and Wilder's names credited, whilst noting the cameo appearance of Tarantino. In 2007, the collection was made available via Amazon Video.

Seemingly, the film dated back a couple of years before its release, where in The Hollywood Reporter of October 7, 1991, the issue noted that "Principal photography was completed last month in northern Texas on 'The Coriolis Effect,' a short film written and directed by Louis Venosta."

For the film's limited theatrical release, it was paired up as a double feature with a 1993 German short film, Making Up!. On October 21, 1994, the Los Angeles Daily News noted that the pairing of the films would court disaster. "Putting the short films 'The Coriolis Effect' and 'Making Up!' together on the same bill, as the Nuart has this week, is like fixing up RuPaul, the cross-dressing entertainer, on a blind date with a tomboy. It'll never work, because each wants too much to be the other."

== Plot ==
Two young lovers Ray and Suzy are split apart by the revelation of Suzy's one night stand with Ray's best friend, and fellow storm chaser, Stanley. Both friends operate a Toteable Tornado Observatory ("Toto" for short) in a pickup truck. Before Ray and Suzy can resolve their issues, Ray is called away to chase the biggest tornado producing storm to hit Texas in a century along with Stanley. As they race towards the storm, arguing and fighting with each other, they come across a mysterious woman named Ruby, who changes the course of their destiny and scramble their senses and lives.

== Cast ==
- Jennifer Rubin as Ruby
- James Wilder as Stanley
- Dana Ashbrook as Ray
- Corinne Bohrer as Suzy
- David Patch as Terry
- Quentin Tarantino as Panhandle Slim (voice)

== Reception ==
In the 1996 book Tarantino A to Zed: The Films of Quentin Tarantino, authors Alan Barnes and Marcus Hearn stated:

The Coriolis Effect featured a voice-only cameo courtesy Tarantino, here playing DJ Panhandle Slim; directed by Louis Venosta, this 35 minute short putting a contemporary spin on The Wizard of Oz headlined Dana Ashbrook and Jennifer Rubin.

In the Chicago Tribune issue of April 13, 1995, movie critic Michael Wilmington gave three and a half out of five stars, and stated:

"Making Up!" and "The Coriolis Effect" - the highly entertaining featurettes that make up an excellent double bill starting Friday at Facets Multimedia - are two bawdy, irreverent youth comedies that share an interesting theme: They're about best friends whose lives are complicated by their romantic pursuits. But there's a catch. In the 1993 German "Making Up!", the chums are female. In the American "Coriolis Effect," - which won the Grand Prize for Short Films at the 1994 Venice Film Festival - the buddies are guys. The movies go in what seem to be opposite directions: "Making Up!" undermines romantic fantasies, while "Coriolis Effect" dives right into them. But they share a real liveliness, breezy pace, stylistic snap and charmingly subversive wit. The sharp and swanky contemporary urban colors of "Making Up!" contrast vividly with the stylish, bleak, black-and-white Western landscapes of "The Coriolis Effect", set in the wide-open Texas panhandle. This is an impudent, fast, dreamy romantic comedy. Among this little gem's many weirdo pleasures are a cameo by the indefatigable Quentin Tarantino as radio deejay Panhandle Slim.

On November 4, 1994, Kansas City Star gave the film three out of five stars, along with the German short film Making Up!.

Also on November 4, 1994, Paul Sherman of Boston Herald compared the film with Making Up!, stating:

"The Coriolis Effect" is only slightly more profound but at least has energy. Louis Venosta's black-and-white short drives a wedge between two friends after the first's girlfriend tells him she slept with his buddy.

In the New York Times issue of March 26, 1994, author Caryn James reviewed the film based on the showing at the film festival. The review stated:

A woman who walks into a tornado, a murderer who explains himself, and the nerdiest stepfather in the suburbs are the heroes of the three films joined under the rubric "Tall Tales." The works have nothing much in common beyond black-and-white photography, a length more suited to sitcoms than arty films like these (a half-hour, give or take five minutes) and a slightly macabre view of human relationships. In quality, their dissimilarities are even more glaring. The best is "The Coriolis Effect," a fresh, self-assured film about sexual jealousy, dangerous living and the afterlife, with a nod to "The Wizard of Oz." The tale begins with the sounds of a jazzy saxophone and of a couple making love, as it happens on their kitchen table. In the midst of this, with a tornado heading their way, Suzy tells her boyfriend, Ray, that she has slept with his best friend Stanley. Almost immediately both men are called to their unlikely jobs as tornado watchers. On the road, chasing the twister, Stanley feels bad about his fling with Suzy. The film takes a deft, fantastic turn when the men wander upon Ruby. Mordantly funny and sharp, "The Coriolis Effect" was written and directed by Louis Venosta, a screenwriter whose credits include the Mel Gibson/Goldie Hawn movie "Bird on a Wire". Despite some fussy camera movements, this is the only film of the three to create the sense of discovery that the New Directors/New Films series is all about.

In The Michigan Daily of January 24, 1995, Shirley Lee reviewed the film, stating:

Undeniably provocative and eccentric, "The Coriolis Effect" and "Making Up!" both scrutinize love as being both a virus and a panacea. Though unlike one another narratively and visually, these two brief stories concern themselves foremost with taking a chance on the uncertain. Fans of efficiency take note: Director Louis Venosta of "The Coriolis Effect" needs a mere 10 seconds to fully entice you and let you know that allotting an hour to this black and white production is a win-win situation. At face value, "The Coriolis Effect", a mediological term meaning the spinning of the earth, characterizes how an intense spin effects tornadoes. "The Coriolis Effect" results in a film that details the empathy and inspiration Ray and Stan find when they cross Ruby, a nonsensical but fearless wild woman, on their mission to observe the mighty Twister, a tornado. Essentially, these two men of science resolve their personal conflict through Ruby, who ultimately walks into Twister as a sacrifice for the sins of mankind. To many, the film may strike them as an eccentric of Monmartre. But to those true devotees of aesthetics and style before substance, the film embodies near perfection. Unlike many films of high artistic visions but with little heart, "The Coriolis Effect" epitomizes both heart and soul into a story of courage shattering skepticism and love triumphing over fear. Venosta, beyond the real of artistry, creates quick-witted and daringly enlightening dialogue, although at times it is cliché-laden by trite and generic metaphors such as "a kiss to set you free" and speaking of love in terms of "a leap of faith." The delivery by Ruby (Jennifer Rubin) tops in this five-persons-cast, speaking with conviction, certainty, and disarming, infectious humor.

In the Los Angeles Times of October 21, 1994, writer Kevin Thomas stated:

German filmmaker Katja von Garnier's effervescent, 55-minute "Makin' Up" and Louis Venosta's distinctive 35-minute "The Coriolis Effect" add up to an amusing commentary on the state of relations between men and women today. We most certainly are going to hear more from both Von Garnier and Venosta.

The Sarasota Herald-Tribune of February 17, 1995, saw movie critic Bill Kelley reviewing the film and the Making Up! film together, stating:

The era of the double-feature – two watchable moves, one reasonable price – is gone. But two movies representing the next best thing arrive today. “Making Up!” and “The Coriolis Effect” share two qualities: short running times and leading characters who chatter away with incredible frustration about the opposite sex. It’s a safe bet that the films’ brevity was the deciding factor in paring them. Their resemblance otherwise is completely superficial. “Making Up!” is the “A” feature in this double-bill, so, naturally, I preferred “The Coriolis Effect” instead. It has everything you hope for in an independent film – wit, style and an originality that big budgets cannot buy – along with one element you fear: Its title sounds like something a gardener would tell you is wrong with your plants. Divulging any of the surprises in a half-hour movie is unfair, so let’s just say that the meaning of the title is explained in the first 10 minutes of “The Coriolis Effect” – and it’s still a lousy title. But everything in the film itself is fascinating, especially the manner in which Louis Venosta, the writer-director, alternately makes the approaching tornado a comic backdrop and a very real threat. He employs some economical but convincing trick photography to create the illusion of a ravaging storm. Venosta gets terrific performances from four of the best young actors in Hollywood. The intensity of the acting never tips over into melodrama. “Making Up!” is slicker and more conventionally assured than its American co-feature, which is why it suffers in comparison. But it, too, has a bracing wit and style that is extremely appealing.

The News Tribune of October 15, 1994 stated that "'Making Up!' and 'The Coriolis Effect' is an inspired pairing of short films, one from Germany and one from the United States." The review also noted the character Ruby (Jennifer Rubin) with her "literally tempestuous personality".
