= A Woman, Her Men, and Her Futon =

- American poster of "A Woman, Her Men, and Her Futon"
- Directed by: Michael Sibay
- Written by: Michael Sibay
- Produced by: Dale Rosenbloom; Michael Sibay (as Mussef Sibay); Roy McAree (executive producer); Letitia Schwartz (line producer); Patricia Reich (associate producer); Florina Roberts (associate producer)
- Starring: Jennifer Rubin; Lance Edwards; Grant Show
- Edited by: Howard Heard
- Music by: Joel Goldsmith
- Production companies: Interpersonal Films Inc. Sibay Films
- Distributed by: First Look International
- Release date: 1992
- Running time: 90 minutes
- Country: United States
- Language: English

A Woman, Her Men, and Her Futon is a 1992 drama film directed, written and produced by Michael Sibay and starring Jennifer Rubin, Lance Edwards and Grant Show.

== Background ==
The film stars Jennifer Rubin as Helen, Lance Edwards as Donald and Grant Show as Randy. Others in the film included Michael Cerveris as Paul, Robert Lipton as Max and Delaune Michel as Gail. Richard Gordon had played a character named Jimmy but all the scenes involving the character were cut from the final release.

Originally, both Marisa Tomei and Julianne Moore auditioned for the lead role of Helen.

Following the film's original laser-disc release in 1992 and its American VHS release in 1997, the film was released on DVD in the US only, in 2001, which remains in-print to date.

The film's original tagline read "How many men, how many times, how many ways?" The film's DVD tagline reads "She's got all the right stuff, but all the wrong men..."

According to Independent Feature Project Filmmaker, Volume 1, the film was warmly received at the Houston festival and was to screen at Stockholm in the fall. Overseas Film Group had also picked up foreign rights, already selling the film in a number of territories.

== Plot ==
Helen, a divorced, attractive twenty-something Los Angeles office worker, has just broken up with her possessive boyfriend Paul. Living beyond her means, Helen soon loses her car and her apartment, and has to move in with her friend Donald, an aspiring screenwriter. Helen helps Donald with his screenplay, while secretly writing her own. Donald introduces Helen to Max, a producer who takes an interest in her and her screenplay. Feeling cornered by Paul, Max and Donald, who also wants a relationship with her, Helen has a series of casual affairs. These flings and her past relationships end up in her screenplay, which she is successful in selling. The story ends as Helen, now a published screenwriter, moves out of Donald's house, and drives away with her futon in tow.

== Cast ==
- Jennifer Rubin as Helen
- Lance Edwards as Donald
- Grant Show as Randy
- Michael Cerveris as Paul
- Robert Lipton as Max
- Delaune Michel as Gail
- Richard Gordon as Jimmy (scenes deleted)
- Jennifer Zuniga as Waitress #1
- Kathryn Atwood as Waitress #2
- Gary Cusano as Apartment Manager
- Kirsten Hall as Sales Woman

== Reception ==
Upon release, Kevin Thomas of the Los Angeles Times described the film as "thoughtful" and "engaging", adding: "In his feature film debut, Sibay is wonderful with actors and dialogue but needs to tighten his pacing and, in long verbal stretches, to learn how to avoid occasional tedium. These, however, are typical first-film flaws, easily forgivable in the light of Sibay's overall accomplishment." Bob Strauss of the Los Angeles Daily News wrote: "A Woman, Her Men and Her Futon aspires to be an up-to-the-minute report from the front of the war between the sexes. Some of the film's particulars feel a tad dated, and the basic conflict, of course, is as old as Adam and Eve. But despite its familiarity and predictable, self-pitying tone, Futon generates a remarkable degree of behavioral credibility. Thanks to a solid, multilayered performance by Rubin, Sibay concocts a spare, sexy movie, a tale of old-fashioned romantic confusion that often seems fresh."

TV Guide gave the film two out of four stars and described the film as a "slow-moving drama", which "drags in spots, but [is] well acted and has good production values". The reviewer added: "It also intelligently addresses the issues of manipulation, frustration and false hope that take place within relationships." After the film was shown at the Stockholm International Film Festival, movie critic Susanne Ljung wrote: "This film should be obligatory pepping for all young women! Women's shaky way to independence, both sexual and professional, is all too seldom portrayed as sensitively and penetratingly as in this film."

The Dutch VPRO Cinema awarded the film three and a half stars out of five and wrote: "An independent production in the tradition of Sex, Lies & Videotape, [but] without this level being reached. The parallel between Helen and the film project being talked about is a bit too obvious." Joe Leydon of Variety (magazine) stated: "Provocative title and a few steamy scenes are the only conceivable selling points for Sibay's A Woman, Her Men and Her Futon. Small-budget pic is by turns laughably stilted and sophomorically self-referential as a drama about L.A. scriptwriter wannabes, their sexual hang-ups and their mind games." In their DVD & Video Guide 2004, authors Mick Martin and Marsha Porter gave an unfavorable review: "Pointless film about a shallow woman who uses men for sex, money, and her career. She's so insipid and unsympathetic that it's painful to watch."

Iotis Erlewine of AllMovie gave the film a two out of five star rating. The book VideoHound's Golden Movie Retriever gave the film two out of five stars.
