= Deceptions II: Edge of Deception =

- Directed by: George Mihalka
- Written by: Ken Denbow; Simon Abbott; Miguel Tejada-Flores
- Starring: Mariel Hemingway; Stephen Shellen; Jennifer Rubin
- Distributed by: Libra Pictures
- Release date: September 15, 1995
- Running time: 92 minutes
- Country: United States
- Language: English

Deceptions II: Edge of Deception is a 1995 drama film directed by George Mihalka, written by Ken Denbow, starring Mariel Hemingway, Stephen Shellen and Jennifer Rubin. It is the sequel to the 1990 film Deceptions.

== Plot ==
A detective gets involved with a reporter.

== Cast ==
- Mariel Hemingway as Joan Branson
- Stephen Shellen as Lieutenant Nick Gentry
- Jennifer Rubin as Irene Stadler
- Wally Dalton as Detective Rains
- Vladimir Kulich as Allan Stadler
- Ken Roberts as Captain Harrelson
- Zachary Throne as Artie Samson
