= Thom Bierdz =

American actor

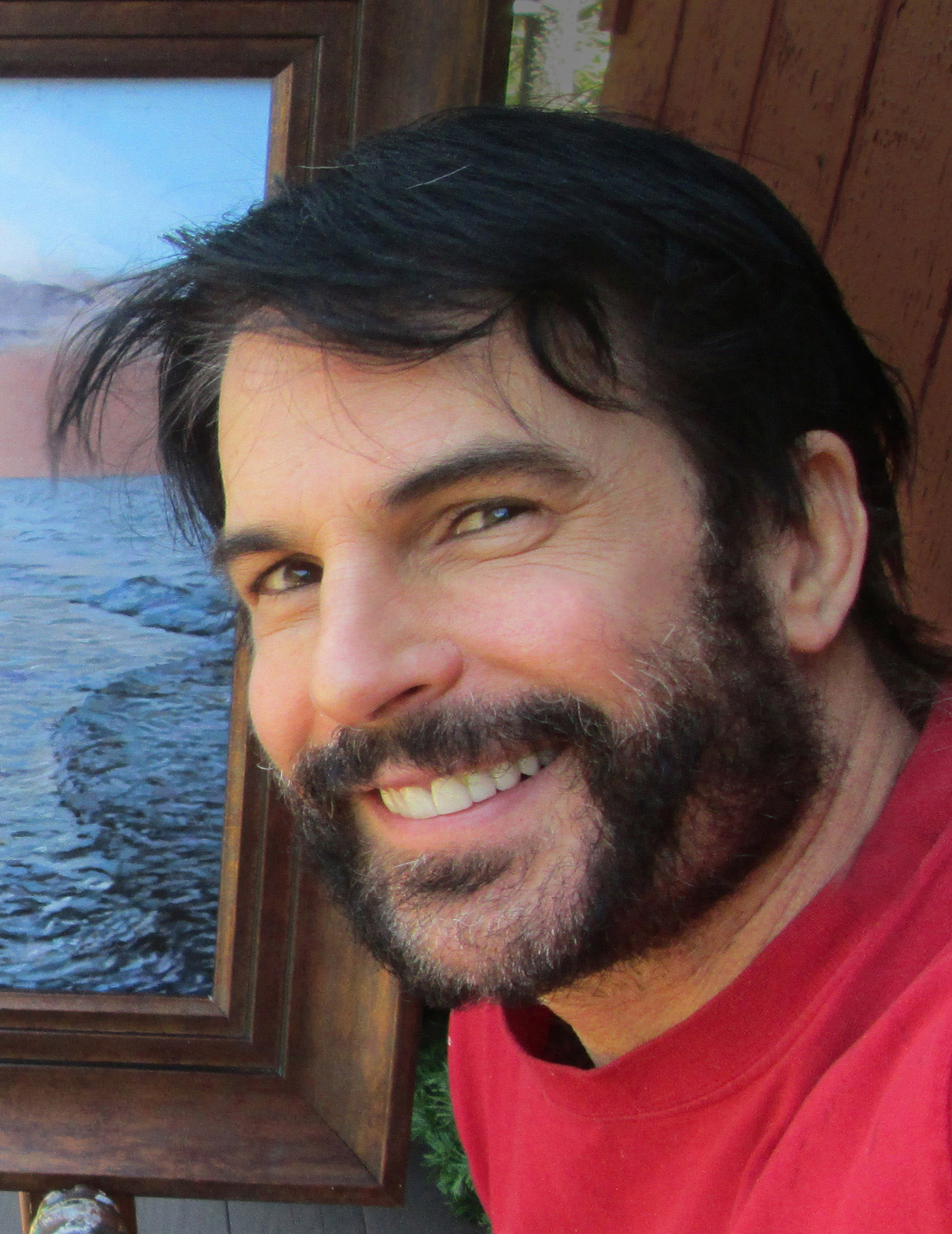
- Bierdz in 2016
- Born: March 25, 1962 (age 64); Kenosha, Wisconsin, U.S.
- Occupation: Actor
- Years active: 1985–present
- Known for: Phillip Chancellor III on The Young and the Restless

Thom Bierdz (born March 25, 1962) is an American television actor. He is best known for his portrayal of Phillip Chancellor III on the daytime drama The Young and the Restless.

== Career ==
He appeared on The Young and the Restless, from 1986 to 1989, returning for a "dream sequence" in 2004, and in a surprising twist, returned to the role in May 2009, 2010 and 2011. He was also a recurring guest star on Melrose Place as Sarah's abusive boyfriend, Hank. Other TV credits include guest starred twice on Murder, She Wrote (1994, 1995), Matlock (1993), Robin's Hoods (1994) and Highway to Heaven (1986), Win, Lose or Draw (1989) and The New Hollywood Squares (1988, 1989). Bierdz played Bobby Burton on the web series Old Dogs New Tricks in 2012 and 2013.

Bierdz co-founded American Art Awards in 2008. He has since been president of the prestigious online art competition which annually awards USA's Best Galleries & Museums, and with their critique, awards over 300 artists in 50 categories from over 60 countries. In 2023, he expanded to also launch World Art Awards, a similar online competition.

== Filmography ==
Television and Film
Year	Title	Role	Notes
1985	St. Elmo's Fire	Rowdy Undergrad	
1986	Highway to Heaven	Paul Hiller	1 episode: "The Torch"
1986	The Gladiator	Kid	
1986–89, 2004, 2009–11	The Young and the Restless	Phillip Chancellor III	114 episodes
1993	Matlock	Bobby Simpson	1 episode: "The Class"
1994	Robin's Hoods	Lenny Wimmer	1 episode: "The Pawn"
1994	Melrose Place	Hank	2 episodes: "Imperfect Strangers" and "Devil with the G-String On"
1994-1995	Murder, She Wrote	Richard Binyon (1994) / Phil Carmichael (1995)	2 episodes: "Wheel of Death" and "A Quaking in Aspen"
2000	Warm Texas Rain	Michael	
2002	The Last Place on Earth	Rich (credited as Zoey Drake)	
2012-2016	Old Dogs & New Tricks	Bobby Burton	web series, 12 episodes

== Personal life ==
Bierdz's ancestry is Polish on his father's side and Italian on his mother's side. He left The Young and the Restless in July 1989 to pursue film roles.

His youngest brother Troy, who had been living with him in Los Angeles, returned to Wisconsin. Shortly thereafter, in July 1989, Troy murdered their mother, Phyllis, with a baseball bat and is currently serving a sentence of 50 years without the possibility of parole in a Wisconsin prison. In May 2000, his brother Gregg died by suicide. He has one sister. In 2018, Bierdz appeared in and narrated an episode of Evil Lives Here on the Investigation Discovery (ID) Network, based on his memoir Forgiving Troy. In the show, he recounts his brother Troy's life and his strange behavior leading to his mother's murder.

Bierdz is gay. After acting, Bierdz has devoted most of his life to painting. In 2005, he received the 2005 Out Best Emerging Artist of Los Angeles for painting pictures of cows. He is also the recipient of the Key to the Light Award from The Thalians.

In September 2009, The Human Rights Campaign at a black tie gala themed "Speak Your Truth" presented Bierdz with its Visibility Award for his continued contributions to charity work for human rights through his visual art, acting and writing.

== Works ==
- Bierdz, T. (2009). Forgiving Troy: A True Story of Murder, Mental Illness and Recovery. Independent Publishers. ISBN 978-1-61539-485-2.
- Bierdz, Thom (2018). Young, Gay & Restless: My Scandalous On-Screen & Off-Screen Sexual Liberations. ISBN 978-1-7327320-1-8.
- Bierdz, Thom (2018). Anonymous True Accounts: How Men REALLY Feel About Being Sexually Assaulted. Thom Bierdz Incorporated. ISBN 978-1-7327320-5-6.
- Bierdz, Thom (2018). 100 B&W Male Nude Prints & 100 B&W Photos of the Artist. ISBN 978-1-7327320-3-2
- Bierdz, Thom (2019). They Want to Help Us: Phenomenal True-Life Accounts of the Unexplainable: 100 Miraculous Spirit Encounters. Amazon Digital Services LLC - KDP Print US. ISBN 978-1-7327320-7-0.
- Bierdz, Thom (2019). The 100 Blue X Cards. ISBN 978-1-7327320-4-9
- Bierdz, Thom (2022). The 12 Days Of Christmas Novella. ISBN 979-8-8395-2863-5
- Bierdz, Thom (2022). How to Look and Feel 20 Years Younger. ISBN 979-8-5085-6321-9
- Bierdz, Thom (2022). Bierdz Art: Volume 1. Landscapes: 12 Days of Christmas Cottages ISBN 979-8-8459-9301-4
- Bierdz, Thom (2022). Bierdz Art: Volume 2. Expressionism: Including the 100 Blue X Paintings. ISBN 979-8-8459-8944-4
- Bierdz, Thom (2022). Bierdz Art: Volume 3. The Complete Color Nudes in Trees. ISBN 979-8-8459-7944-5
- Bierdz, Thom (2022). Bierdz Art: Volume 4. People & Pets: Have a Celebrity Paint Your Loved Ones. ISBN 979-8-8459-6640-7
