= The Fear Inside (film) =

- American VHS cover
- Genre: Thriller; Drama
- Screenplay by: David Birke
- Story by: Alan Jay Glueckman
- Directed by: Leon Ichaso
- Starring: Christine Lahti; Dylan McDermott; Jennifer Rubin
- Theme music composer: Michel Rubini
- Country of origin: United States
- Original language: English

Production
- Producers: John C. Broderick; Alan Jay Glueckman; Judie Gregg; Helena Hacker
- Cinematography: Bojan Bazelli
- Editor: Gary Karr
- Running time: 115 minutes
- Production company: Viacom Productions

Original release
- Network: Showtime Cable Network
- Release: August 9, 1992

The Fear Inside is a 1992 thriller/drama television film starring Christine Lahti, Dylan McDermott and Jennifer Rubin, directed by Leon Ichaso. The film first aired on August 9, 1992, on the Showtime Cable Network.

The film was nominated for two CableACE awards, one being "Actress in a Movie or Miniseries" (Christine Lahti), and the other being "Directing a Movie or Miniseries" (Leon Ichaso).

== Plot ==
Agoraphobic children's book illustrator Meredith Cole is unable to leave her own home, and since her husband leaves, she decides to place an ad in the paper for someone to rent her guest bedroom. Jane Caswell rents the room, whilst her alleged brother Pete Caswell soon joins the household too, although it becomes clear that they are both not what they seem. Jane claims she's a vet and her brother claims he's a cop. Things go to extremes when Cole finds evidence of their criminal activity, leading the two young psychos-in-love to terrorize her. When Jane kidnaps and threatens to kill Cole's son, she has no choice but to overcome her paralyzing fears and attempt to leave her home to save him.

== Cast ==
- Christine Lahti as Meredith Cole
- Dylan McDermott as Pete Caswell
- Jennifer Rubin as Jane Caswell
- David Ackroyd as Brandon Cole
- Thomas Ian Nicholas as Sean Cole
- Paul Linke as Carl Landers
- Mike Barger as Carlos Salcido
- Gloria McCord as Carolyn Lancaster

== Reception ==
Upon release, Los Angeles Times gave a favorable review and wrote: "...the production is a cut or two above most suspense stories because of the gripping performances and a script that takes the old premise of a victim trapped in her house and turns it into a crackling sexual/psychological shocker." People gave a C− grade and described the film as a "routine thriller". They commented: "Woman-in-peril movies show up on TV as often as Dan Quayle jokes. There are a few tense moments, thanks to Rubin's manic-performance and some noir-ish camera work. The excitement evaporates as the story becomes increasingly predictable. When the movie gels down to its big finish, it has become more silly than scary. The ending goes on forever, with Lahti continually breaking free from these wackos and then getting recaptured. Viewer interest is likely to wane long before Lahti gets around to tackling her fear of the outdoors."

Entertainment Weekly wrote an unfavorable review, stating: "How a fine actress like Christine Lahti got involved in a miserable project like The Fear Inside is one of the mysteries of summer-doldrums TV." Describing the storyline as a "stretch", the reviewer added: "...still, there is unexpected humor: as Rubin's character becomes more and more criminally insane, her hair goes wild in a Phyllis Diller-ish way and her eyes bug out like Michael Keaton's in Beetlejuice. Now, that's entertainment." On the UK VHS release, the Los Angeles Times also quoted "gripping performances - coiled like a spring". On the same cover, New York Daily News wrote: "Not a film for the faint of heart". Both the TV Guide Network and Hal Erickson of AllMovie gave the film three out of five stars.

== Home media ==
The film was released on VHS in America and the UK, with the American distribution being handled by Media Home Entertainment.

== See also ==
- List of films featuring home invasions
