= Panama Sugar =

- Theatrical release poster by Renato Casaro
- Directed by: Marcello Avallone
- Written by: Marcello Avallone; Vincenzo Mannino; Roberto Parpaglioni; Andrea Purgatori
- Produced by: Josi W. Konski
- Starring: Scott Plank; Oliver Reed
- Cinematography: Roberto Benvenuti
- Edited by: Adriano Tagliavia
- Music by: Gabriele Ducros
- Distributed by: Delta
- Release date: 4 May 1990 (Italy)
- Running time: 110 minutes
- Country: Italy
- Language: Italian

Panama Sugar is a 1990 Italian comedy film directed by Marcello Avallone and starring by Scott Plank and Oliver Reed.

== Plot ==
On an idyllic Caribbean island, Panama Sugar and his friends, engage a battle with Fox Perry, the wealthy American boss who would like to purchase the island to make a Las Vegas exotic.

== Cast ==
- Scott Plank as Panama Sugar
- Oliver Reed as General
- Lucrezia Lante della Rovere as Liza
- Vittorio Amandola as Fox Perry
- Duilio Del Prete as Blue Ball
- Memè Perlini as Lt. Garcia
- Francesco Scimemi as Mozart
- Massimiliano Ubaldi as Bad twin
- Josette Martial

== See also ==
- List of Italian films of 1990
