= Mitchell Anderson =

American character actor and chef (born 1961)

- Born: Mitchell Ogren Anderson; August 21, 1961 (age 65); Jamestown, New York, U.S.
- Occupation: Actor
- Years active: 1985–2003, 2018–present

Mitchell Ogren Anderson (born August 21, 1961) is an American character actor and chef.

Anderson was born in Jamestown, New York, to a retail store owner mother and a businessman father. He attended Jamestown High School and Williams College before going on to attend Juilliard School. In 1985, he appeared on the Bert Convy-hosted Super Password, where he won $400. Anderson is openly gay and came out during the 1996 GLAAD Media Awards, after which point he became active with gay causes and the Human Rights Campaign. Anderson lives in Atlanta, Georgia, with his partner of many years Richie Arpino, and owns a restaurant called MetroFresh.

== Filmography ==
=== Film ===
Year	Title	Role	Notes
1986	SpaceCamp	Banning	
1987	Jaws: The Revenge	Sean Brody	
1988	Deadly Dreams	Alex Torme	
1988	One Fine Night	Michael	Short film
1988	It's Cool to Care		Short film
1992	All-American Murder	Doug Sawyer	
1995	The Midwife's Tale	Sir Giles	
1998	Relax...It's Just Sex	Vincey Sauris	
1999	Taking the Plunge		Short film
2002	The Last Place on Earth	Ken	
2026	Once More: The Karen Carpenter Story Reunion	Himself	

=== Television ===
Year	Title	Role	Notes
1985	Days of Our Lives	Kip	8 episodes
1985	Hill Street Blues	Mitch Carey	Episode: "Davenport in a Storm"
1985	Riptide	Chris 'Spud' Miller	Episode: "Wipeout"
1985	Crazy Like a Fox		Episode: "Eye in the Storm"
1985	Cagney & Lacey	Teenager	Episode: "Old Ghosts"
1986	Intimate Encounters	Sean	TV film
1987	Highway to Heaven	Danny Briggs	Episode: "A Night to Remember"
1987	The Hitchhiker	Butchie	Episode: "Why Are You Here?"
1987	21 Jump Street	Scott Crowe	Episode: "My Future's So Bright, I Gotta Wear Shades"
1987	Jake and the Fatman	Peter Brock	Episode: "Love for Sale"
1987	Student Exchange	Rod	TV film
1988	Goodbye, Miss 4th of July	Henderson kerr	TV film
1989–1993	Doogie Howser, M.D.	Dr. Jack McGuire	Regular; 51 episodes
1989	The Karen Carpenter Story	Richard Carpenter	TV film
1989	The Comeback	Bo	TV film
1989	In the Heat of the Night	Bobby Skinner	Episode: "Country Mouse, City Mouse"
1990	Back to Hannibal: The Return of Tom Sawyer and Huckleberry Finn	Huckleberry Finn	TV film
1993	Jack's Place	Peter Halleran	Episode: "The Seventh Meal"
1993	Melrose Place	Rex Weldon	Episode: "Picture Imperfect"
1993	Matlock	Ryland Hayward	Episode: "The Godfather"
1994	Is There Life Out There?	Joshua	TV film
1994–2000	Party of Five	Ross Werkman	20 episodes
1999–2001	Popular	Mr. Bennett	2 episodes
2000	If These Walls Could Talk 2	Arnold	TV film
2003	Beggars and Choosers	Jason	Episode: "Hello, Dalai!"
2018–?	After Forever	Jason	19 episodes
