= Scott Plank =

American actor (1958–2002)

- Born: Scott Chapman Plank; November 11, 1958; Washington, D.C., U.S.
- Died: October 24, 2002 (aged 43); Los Angeles, California, U.S.
- Occupation: Actor
- Years active: 1981–2002

Scott Chapman Plank (November 11, 1958 – October 24, 2002) was an American actor who played Nick Reardon in Melrose Place, and as Wiley Farrell in Air America.

== Life and acting career ==
Scott Plank was born in Washington, D.C., on November 11, 1958.

Plank appeared in The Flying Dutchman in 2001, which co-starred Rod Steiger, Saints and Sinners in 1994, The In Crowd in 1988, Panama Sugar in 1990, which co-starred Oliver Reed, and finally Without Evidence (1995), which co-starred Angelina Jolie. Plank's last feature film was the movie Holes (2003) starring Sigourney Weaver and Jon Voight, in which he had the supporting role of Trout Walker.

His television credits include appearances in The Division (2001), Sons and Daughters (1991), Air America (1998) and Melrose Place (1992). In 1989, Plank starred as Sgt. Vincent Hanna in the TV movie L.A. Takedown, directed by Michael Mann (Al Pacino played Hanna in Mann's 1995 theatrical remake, Heat).

Plank had an extensive theatre background that spans from Broadway to Regional theatre in Los Angeles. He was in the original cast of Dreamgirls on Broadway and toured for many years with A Chorus Line in which he played various roles. Regional theatre roles include Hurlyburly co-starring alongside Sean Penn, and a one-act play Kindness of Women, written and directed by Sean Penn.

== Other works ==
- Member of the original Broadway cast of the 1981 musical Dreamgirls portraying a member of 'The James Early Band'.
- Theater Broadway, Chorus Line Shubert Theater
- The Kindness of Women Writer/Director: Sean Penn
- G.R. Point Director: Howard Fine/ Callboard Theater
- Theater Regional LA, Hurlyburly, Writer-Director: David Rabe/ Westwoodplayhouse
- Theatre, The Fool at the Met Theatre. Director: James Gammon.
- Appeared in Shania Twain's "Dance with the one that brought you", Director: Sean Penn.

== Death ==
On October 24, 2002, Plank died in Los Angeles, California, from injuries sustained from a car accident three days earlier. He was 43 years old. Holes was dedicated to his memory.

== Filmography ==
Year	Title	Role	Notes
1984–1989	Miami Vice	Detective Glen McIntyre	TV series
1985	A Chorus Line	Dancer	
1986	The Princess and the Call Girl	Stanley	
1988	The In Crowd	Dugan	
1989	Wired	Herb Axelson	
1989	L.A. Takedown	Sgt. Vincent Hanna	TV movie
1990	Panama Sugar	Panama	
1991	Pastime	Randy Keever	
1992	Mr. Baseball	Ryan Ward	
1993	Without Warning: Terror in the Towers	Gary Geidel	
1994	Saints and Sinners	Big Boy	
1995-1997	Flipper	Carl Grimes	1 episode
1995	Without Evidence	Kevin Francke	
1996	Marshal Law	Randall Nelson	
1996	American Strays	Sonny	
1996	Co-ed Call Girl	Ron Tamblin	
1997	Moonbase	John Russell	
1997–1998	Melrose Place	Nick Reardon	12 episodes
1998-1999	Air America	Wiley Ferrell	TV series
1999	Charmed	Eric Lohman	1 episode
2000	The Flying Dutchman	Ethan	TV movie
2000–2001	Baywatch	Samuel "Sam" Parks	4 episodes
2001–2003	The Division	John Exstead, Jr.	6 episodes
2003	Holes	Trout Walker	Posthumous release
2005	Guns Before Butter	Teddy	Posthumous release (final film role)
