= The Crush (1993 film) =

1993 film by Alan Shapiro

- Theatrical release poster
- Directed by: Alan Shapiro
- Written by: Alan Shapiro
- Produced by: James G. Robinson
- Starring: Cary Elwes; Alicia Silverstone; Jennifer Rubin; Kurtwood Smith
- Cinematography: Bruce Surtees
- Edited by: Ian Crafford
- Music by: Graeme Revell
- Production company: Morgan Creek Productions
- Distributed by: Warner Bros.
- Release date: April 2, 1993
- Running time: 89 minutes
- Country: United States
- Language: English
- Budget: $6 million
- Box office: $13.6 million (United States)

The Crush is a 1993 American psychological thriller film written and directed by Alan Shapiro, which stars Cary Elwes as Nick Eliot and Alicia Silverstone as Adrian Forrester, in her feature film debut.

Having moved to a new city, magazine writer Nick finds himself the target of his landlords' teenage daughter Adrian's increasingly destructive obsession.

The Crush was produced by Morgan Creek Productions and released by Warner Bros. on April 2, 1993. The film received mostly negative reviews from critics on release, but was a box office hit. It became especially popular through the video rental market, and showings on cable television. In subsequent years it has been labeled a cult film.

== Plot ==
Twenty-eight-year-old writer Nick Eliot secures a job at Pique magazine and finds lodging in a guest house belonging to Cliff and Liv Forrester in Washington. He soon gets to know the couple's 14-year-old daughter Adrian, who frequently visits him. The precocious girl becomes infatuated with him. At the magazine, Nick's editor Michael assigns him a story about a criminal mastermind, but upon turning in his work, Nick realizes that the story has been mysteriously re-written, although his boss is pleased with the result.

Adrian reminds Nick to come to a party that her parents are throwing at the main house. As he enters, he is taken by her impressive piano performance. Nick follows Adrian to an outdoor balcony afterwards, where he muses that if she were ten years older, he would be interested in her romantically.

Adrian asks how his boss liked the article, and it becomes clear to Nick that she was the one who re-wrote it. She apologizes and encourages him to take her for a ride in his convertible. When Nick agrees to drive Adrian to a place of her choosing, she directs him to a secluded spot where she kisses him. While initially receptive, Nick has second thoughts and takes Adrian home.

Nick begins a romance with coworker and photographer Amy. Adrian soon becomes jealous and intercepts Amy in the woods, where she is gathering roasting sticks for Nick's barbecue. When Amy spots a bees' nest in a tree, Adrian subtly warns her that the nest contains wasps rather than bees. After the barbecue, Amy tells Nick that it is clear Adrian has a crush on him and that he needs to rebuff her advances before things get out of hand.

When Nick talks to Adrian about just remaining friends, her actions become destructive. She steals his favorite childhood photo, graffitis his car, and erases his computer discs. He is unable to convince Adrian's parents that she is responsible. Cheyenne, Adrian's only friend, tries to warn Nick about her, but she soon has an accident at the riding school she and Adrian attend. Having spied on Nick in bed with Amy, Adrian later traps her in her darkroom. She empties a nest of wasps into the vents, causing Amy to suffer numerous wasp stings.

Nick, convinced that Adrian is a psychopath, attempts to find new lodging. However, she accuses him of sexual assault and he is arrested. After Michael bails him out, Cheyenne tells Nick that she knows he is innocent and that Adrian has an extensive history of obsessive behavior, citing a previous crush on a camp counselor named Rick, who died after eating poisoned food in what was believed to be an accident.

Cheyenne also informs Nick of a diary Adrian kept that could exonerate him. After she departs, Nick hears strange noises from the Forresters' house. He finds Cheyenne bound and gagged on Adrian's carousel in the attic. Adrian confronts and attacks him. Cliff arrives and attacks Nick, mistaking him for the aggressor. Adrian knocks Cliff unconscious to protect Nick, who then subdues her.

Exonerated, Nick goes to live with Amy in Seattle while Adrian is confined to a psychiatric hospital. When she laments that Nick refuses to speak with her, her doctor remarks that she is making good progress. In the final scene, Adrian returns to her room in the hospital, where she glares at a photo of the doctor and his wife before her frown turns into a devious grin.

== Cast ==
- Cary Elwes as Nick Eliot
- Alicia Silverstone as Adrian/Darian Forrester
- Jennifer Rubin as Amy Maddik
- Kurtwood Smith as Cliff Forrester
- Gwynyth Walsh as Liv Forrester
- Amber Benson as Cheyenne
- Matthew Walker as Michael

== Lawsuit and character name change ==
Writer and director Alan Shapiro claims to have based the film on events from his own life. The girl on whom he based Adrian sued him for using her real name, Darian, for Alicia Silverstone's character. As a result, when the film was re-edited for television, the character's name was changed from Darian to Adrian. The VHS and laserdisc releases retained the original spoken dialogue that called the character Darian. The original theatrical trailer also refers to the character as Darian.

== Reception ==
On Rotten Tomatoes, it has a 27% rating based on reviews from 30 critics. On Metacritic it has a score of 34% based on reviews from 16 critics, indicating "generally unfavorable reviews". Audiences polled by CinemaScore gave the film an average grade of "C+" on an A+ to F scale.

Brian Lowry of Variety compared the film to Poison Ivy (1992) and called it "another by-the-numbers thriller" and was critical of lack of gore or nudity, suggesting the R rating must stand for "ridiculous." Hal Hinson of the Washington Post wrote: "There's something scuzzy about the whole exercise." Janet Maslin of The New York Times said it "Never succeeds in becoming either torrid or scary" and that it "is for the most part grindingly predictable and mechanically played."

In 2025, Silverstone, who was an early teen during filming, reflected on kissing Elwes, believing that it meant they became romantic partners.
