= Stephen Polk =

American actor

- Born: May 15, 1960 (age 64); Dayton, Ohio, United States
- Occupation(s): Film director, screenwriter, actor

Stephen Boyd Polk is an American actor, director, writer, and producer. He is the founder of Providence Productions LLC, an independent film development, production, and finance company.

== Biography ==
Stephen Polk was born in Dayton, Ohio and grew up in Minnesota and later New York City. After starting at a young age with repertory theater and summer stock in Minneapolis, he made his film debut in Ridley Scott's Thelma & Louise and Oliver Stone's Heaven & Earth.

Polk started theater at Blake School in Minneapolis and Westminster in Simsbury, Connecticut. While studying theater, literature and film at Kenyon College (where he received a Bachelor of Arts), he attended the American University in Cairo, Egypt.

He returned to Minneapolis to begin his professional career working at the Children's Theatre Company. His one-man show Truss't won the Walker Art Center Performance Art Award and premiered in Los Angeles at Highways. While writing at the Playwrights Center, he moved to New York City to enroll at NYU Film School for directing and at The Neighborhood Playhouse for acting.

His first notable job was as Harvey Keitel's FBI partner in Thelma & Louise. He co-starred with Eric Roberts and F. Murray Abraham in By the Sword, and then appeared in Where Sleeping Dogs Lie starring Sharon Stone.

The following years included roles in studio films The Pickle and Heaven & Earth, and independent films including Playmaker, Destination Vegas, Bolt, God, Sex & Apple Pie, Drowning on Dry Land, Clubland, Why Doesn't for Love Work, Cherish, and Go for Broke.

In 2001, he started Providence Productions and was hired to produce Resolution.

Under Providence, Polk began developing, writing, and producing, in addition to continuing his work as an actor. Polk has developed, written, and co-written treatments and feature screenplays, including the Sundance Screenplay Competition Finalist, Bearman.

== Production company ==
Providence first co-executive produced a Sundance Festival hit Cherish with Robin Tunney and Tim Blake Nelson and Drowning on Dry Land with Barbara Hershey and Naveen Andrews. Providence also developed and produced In a Dark Place, Sticky Fingers, Dr. Rage with Andrew Divoff, Pirate Camp with Corbin Bernsen, and Dead Air with Bill Moseley.

Providence's latest projects include Baggage, which Polk acted in, produced, wrote, and directed, and The Divided, which he acted in and produced.
