= Playmaker (1994 film) =

- American VHS cover of "Playmaker"
- Directed by: Yuri Zeltser
- Screenplay by: Michael Schroeder (earlier screenplay); Yuri Zeltser
- Story by: Kathryn Nemesh; Darren Block
- Produced by: Thomas Baer; Marc Samuelson; Peter Samuelson; Cheryl Cook (line producer); Anna Godessoff (associate producer); Michael Steinhardt (executive producer)
- Starring: Colin Firth; Jennifer Rubin; John Getz; Jeff Perry; Arthur Taxier; Dean Norris
- Edited by: John Rosenberg
- Music by: Mark Snow
- Production company: Playmaker Productions
- Distributed by: Orion Pictures
- Release date: 1994
- Running time: 91 minutes
- Country: United States
- Language: English

Playmaker (also known as Private Teacher and Death Date) is a drama/mystery/thriller film starring Colin Firth and Jennifer Rubin, directed by Yuri Zeltser. The film was released in 1994.

== Plot ==
Talented young Jamie Harris is a struggling actress who is trying to win a role in an upcoming film called Playmaker. Eager to gain advantage on the competition, Harris' friend Eddie says that he can arrange an introduction with Ross Talbert, an acting teacher with a reputation for grooming top talent. Talbert agrees to tutor Harris for $5,000; she scrapes up the money, only to discover that his lessons are mainly exercises in psychological abuse. Harris learns that a number of Talbert's students who didn't respond to his techniques have turned up dead, and she spies an "F" next to her name in his grade book shortly before he attacks her with a knife; she grabs a gun and kills him. The police determine that Jamie acted in self-defense - but the man who she's been taking lessons with wasn't the real Ross Talbert. As the police arrive at the scene a different corpse is lying dead on the ground, which seems to be the real teacher. As a result, she tries to find the false teacher, and discovers that he was just an actor like herself, named Michael Condren, and that she is just a puppet on a string in a perverse and bizarre story.

== Background ==
The film stars Colin Firth as Ross Talbert/Michael Condren and Jennifer Rubin as Jamie Harris. Others in the film included John Getz as Eddie, Jeff Perry as Allen, Arthur Taxier as Detective Chassman, Dean Norris as Detective Marconi, Belinda Waymouth as Angie and Diane Robin as Terry.

Originally, producer Peter Samuelson saw two people standing on a corner holding a sign "looking for money for movie" to turn their screenplay into a feature film. Their story was used as a basic for the Playmaker screenplay. Playmaker commenced production in August 1993, many months and several re-writes after the initial screenplay was obtained by Samuelson.

With the exception of a few scenes, the film was shot almost entirely in one location in Chatsworth, slightly north of Los Angeles, in a house once owned by the popular 1970s singing team Captain & Tennille.

Since the film's release, Firth has expressed his dislike for the film. In an August 1994 interview for the UK newspaper The Sun, Firth stated "My son happened to be in Los Angeles at the time. It was a three-week job and it paid extremely well. It's a rather silly story about an acting coach who trains an actress by psychologically torturing her. I knew it would be complete rubbish and I sincerely hope no one ever sees it." In a 1997 interview with The Weekly News, he stated "I was desperate to see my son Will after doing six months of theatre in Britain so I said yes to the movie. But it was a terrible film and I hope it sinks without a trace."

In February 1997, Firth spoke of the film again during an interview with Radio Times. He stated "If I want to buy a house, or am about to go bankrupt, and someone comes along with a hefty pay cheque for a ridiculous job, I'd do it. I've made a couple of pieces of crap, although when one is working one takes it seriously. Its embarrassing appearing in rubbish, so you con yourself it's worth while, even though the third eye knows full well it isn't. But I do have a child to support."

The film remains on out-of-print VHS in America to date, while a DVD version exists as a Dutch import release.

The film's main tagline reads "Passion. Seduction. Betrayal.", while the two other taglines read "Its all part of the art." and "An erotic thriller with a killer ending."

Dutch DVD cover of "Playmaker"

== Cast ==
- Colin Firth as Ross Talbert/Michael Condren
- Jennifer Rubin as Jamie Harris
- John Getz as Eddie
- Jeff Perry as Allen
- Arthur Taxier as Detective Chassman
- Dean Norris as Detective Marconi
- Belinda Waymouth as Angie
- Diane Robin as Terry
- Stephen Polk as Director
- Alice Kushida as Casting Assistant
- Clare Kirkconnell as Realtor
- William James Shaw as Script Delivery Person

== Reception ==
Movie Retriever gave the film one and a half out of two, and wrote "Jamie (Rubin) is a struggling actress whose coach Talbert (Firth) guarantees success as long as she follows his bizarre training methods, which include seduction, abuse, and betrayal. Good chemistry between the leads but a mishmash of a script."

The book DVD & Video Guide 2004 (Ballantine Books) gave the film two out of five stars, while TV Guide (Triangle Publications) gave the same rating. The book Creature Features: The Science Fiction, Fantasy, and Horror Movie Guide (Berkley Boulevard Books) gave the film three and a half out of five stars. Doug Pratt's Laserdisc Review gave the film two and a half out of four stars.
