= Amazons and Gladiators =

2001 film by Zachary Weintraub

- Directed by: Zachary Weintraub
- Written by: Zachary Weintraub
- Produced by: MBP (Germany); Tom Kuhn
- Starring: Patrick Bergin; Jennifer Rubin; Mary Tamm; Nichole Hiltz
- Release date: September 2001
- Running time: 94 minutes
- Country: Australia
- Language: English

Amazons and Gladiators is a 2001 drama action adventure film directed and written by Zachary Weintraub and starring Patrick Bergin and Jennifer Rubin. The filming location was Vilnius. The film has many historical inaccuracies and was poorly received by critics.

== Cast ==
- Patrick Bergin as Crassus
- Jennifer Rubin as Ione
- Richard Norton as Lucius
- Nichole Hiltz as Serena
- Mary Tamm as Zenobia
- Wendi Winburn as Gwyned
- Melanie Gutteridge as Briana
- Janina Matiekonyte as B'Shara
- Darius Miniotas as Dance Master
