= Art Evans (actor) =

American actor (1942–2024)

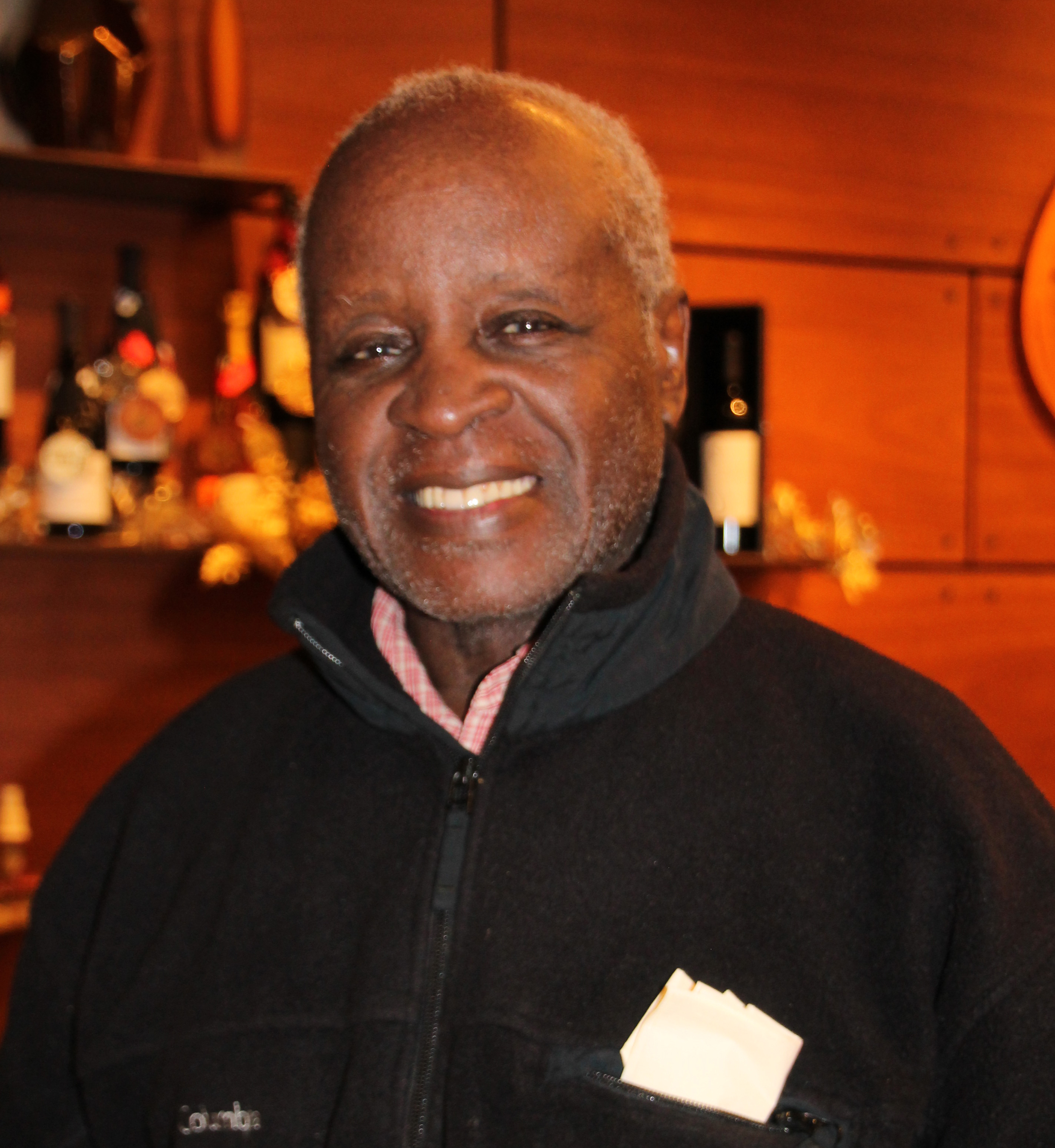
- Evans in 2019
- Born: Arthur James Evans; March 27, 1942; Berkeley, California, U.S.
- Died: December 21, 2024 (aged 82); Los Angeles, California, U.S.
- Occupation: Actor
- Years active: 1972–2023

Arthur James Evans (March 27, 1942 – December 21, 2024) was an American actor who made multiple film and television appearances over five decades.

== Life and career ==
Evans was born in Berkeley, California, on March 27, 1942.

Evans' acting career, spanning almost 40 years, started with Frank Silvera's Theater of Being in Los Angeles. He took a starring role in The Amen Corner which transferred to Broadway in 1965. His first uncredited acting performance in film was Claudine in 1974. His first credited role was in Chico and the Man as Bubba in the episode "Too Many Crooks" which aired in 1976, and his talents for many instruments came in handy when playing Blind Lemon Jefferson in the movie Leadbelly (1976).

One of Evans's early roles was the first victim in the John Carpenter film Christine, based on the novel by Stephen King; Evans played a Detroit auto worker found dead on the assembly line after daring to flick cigar ash on Christine's upholstery. In 1984, Evans co-starred in the all-star African-American drama A Soldier's Story as the memorable brown-nosing character Wilkie. He is probably best known for his role as Leslie Barnes in the action film Die Hard 2 (1990) in which he played the chief engineer at Dulles International Airport that helps LAPD detective John McClane, played by Bruce Willis, stop terrorists from crashing planes. His other film credits include Big Time (1977), Youngblood (1978), The Cracker Factory (1979), National Lampoon's Class Reunion (1982), Into the Night (1985), Fright Night (1985), Jo Jo Dancer, Your Life Is Calling (1986), Ruthless People (1986), Native Son (1986), White of the Eye (1987), School Daze (1988), The Mighty Quinn (1989), Downtown (1990), Trespass (1992), CB4 (1993), Bitter Harvest (1993), Tales from the Hood (1995) and Metro (1997). He has also made many appearances in a variety of television shows such as M*A*S*H, Hill Street Blues, Monk, The X-Files, and Family Matters on which he played a man claiming to be Santa Claus. His most recognizable television role was on A Different World, portraying Mr. Johnson, father of Ron Johnson (portrayed by Darryl M. Bell).

Evans also starred in the music video for Stevie Wonder's "Go Home".

In 2010, Evans was seen in Anderson's Cross playing the grandfather of the lead character Nick Anderson. In 2011, Art had a guest appearance on the sitcom Last Man Standing in the episode titled "Grandparents Day".

== Death ==
Evans died of complications from diabetes in Los Angeles on December 21, 2024, at the age of 82.

== Selected filmography ==
- Sisters (1972) as African Room Waiter (uncredited)
- Claudine (1974) as Young Brother (uncredited)
- Death Wish (1974) as Police at Precinct (uncredited)
- Amazing Grace (1974) as Well-Wisher at Train Station (uncredited)
- Leadbelly (1976) as Blind Lemon Jefferson
- Fun with Dick and Jane (1977) as Man At Bar
- Big Time (1977) as Buzz Murdock
- Youngblood (1978) as Junkie
- The In-Laws (1979) as Driver
- The Main Event (1979) as Fighter
- The Apple Dumpling Gang Rides Again (1979) as Baggage Master
- First Family (1980) as Longo's Right Hand Man
- Wrong Is Right (1982) as Warehouse Guard
- National Lampoon's Class Reunion (1982) as Carl Clapton
- Christine (1983) as Auto Assembly Worker (uncredited)
- A Soldier's Story (1984) as Private Wilkie
- Tuff Turf (1985) as Security Guard
- Into the Night (1985) as Jimmy
- Fright Night (1985) as Detective Lennox
- Jo Jo Dancer, Your Life Is Calling (1986) as Arturo
- Ruthless People (1986) as Lt. Bender
- Native Son (1986) as Doc
- White of the Eye (1987) as Detective Charles Mendoza
- School Daze (1988) as Cedar Cloud
- The Mighty Quinn (1989) as Jump Jones
- A Different World (1989, TV Series) as Mr. Johnson (Ron Johnson's father)
- Downtown (1990) as Henry Coleman
- Die Hard 2 (1990) as Leslie Barnes
- Mom (1991) as Lt. Hendrix
- The Finishing Touch (1992) as Lieutenant Morman
- Trespass (1992) as Bradlee
- CB4 (1993) as Albert Sr.
- Bitter Harvest (1993) as Earl Yates
- Tales from the Hood (1995) as Eli
- Bushwhacked (1995) as Marty (uncredited)
- The Great White Hype (1996) as Minister
- Metro (1997) as Lt. Sam Baffett
- The Breaks (1999)
- The Story of Us (1999) as George
- The Cheapest Movie Ever Made (2000)
- Deadly Rhapsody (2001) as James Tanner
- Interstate 60 (2002) as Otis
- Never Die Alone (2004) as Mr. Waters
- Monk (TV series) (2006) as Rusty
- Young Cesar (2007)
- Everybody Hates Chris (2007, TV Series) as Luther
- Shades of Ray (2008) as Tyler
- Machete Joe (2010) as Sammy
- House Under Siege (2010) as Jack Miller
- Church (2010) as Pastor Jones
- Anderson's Cross (2010) as Grandfather
- iSteve (2013) as Ol' Mose
- Gemini Rising (2013) as General Tabor
- Orphaned (2018) as Councilman Haley (final film role)
