= Tracey Needham =

American actress (born 1967)

- Born: March 28, 1967 (age 59); Dallas, Texas, U.S.
- Years active: 1985–present
- Spouse: Tommy Hinkley (m. 1995)
- Children: 1

Tracey Needham (born March 28, 1967) is an American actress who has acted primarily in television roles such as Paige Thatcher on Life Goes On (2nd–4th seasons; 1990–1993), Lieutenant Junior Grade (LTJG) Meg Austin on the first season of JAG (1995–1996), and as Inspector Candace DeLorenzo on The Division (2001–2003).

== Biography ==
Needham was born on March 28, 1967, in Dallas, Texas, where her father was a homebuilder. She has three brothers.

In 1975, when Needham was 8 years old, her parents moved to Denver, Colorado, and her father's work dictated the family move back and forth between the two cities. She attended both Cherry Creek High School and Plano Senior High School, the latter where she graduated in 1985.

In 1988, Needham went to Los Angeles to study acting and audition for roles. She made her TV acting debut on Jake and the Fatman. After acting classes, she landed the role of Paige Thatcher, the big sister, on Life Goes On, beginning in the series' second season.

While growing up, she was always jumping into football games, wanting to be treated equally by the males and not have boys take it easy on her. She re-called her past to play the strong feminine Meg Austin in the first season of JAG. Needham portrayed a Navy judge advocate and a computer-weapons expert.

Needham married actor Tommy Hinkley in January 1995 and they have a daughter, Katie, born in 1999. Needham and Hinkley moved to Colorado to open a children's acting school.

== Filmography ==
Year	Title	Role	Notes
1988	Jake and the Fatman	Gloria Connor	Episode: "Rhapsody in Blue"
1989–1990	Coach	Ann	Episodes: "Carnival Knowledge" and "Dauber's Got a Girl"
1990	Shannon's Deal	Gail	Episode: "Sanctuary"
1990–1993	Life Goes On	Paige Thacher	Series regular, 40 episodes
1992	Bonnie & Clyde: The True Story	Bonnie Parker	TV movie
1993	Prophet of Evil: The Ervil LeBaron Story	Rena	TV movie
1993	Lush Life	Sarah	TV movie
1994	Sensation	Maryann	
1995–1997	VR.5	Samantha Bloom	4 episodes
1995–1996	JAG	Lt. j.g. Meg Austin	Series regular, 20 episodes
1997	Last Stand at Saber River	Lorraine Kidston	TV movie
1997	Buried Alive II	Roxanne	TV movie
1997	Tupperware Party	Stacey	Short film
1997	Total Security	Ellie Jones	Series regular, 13 episodes
1999	Justice	Gina Gallagher	TV movie
2000	The Pretender	Rachel Daly	Episode: "School Daze"
2000	919 Fifth Avenue	Julia Van Degen	TV movie
2001	The Ponder Heart	Elsie Fleming	TV movie
2001–2003	The Division	Inspector Candace 'C. D.' DeLorenzo	Series regular, 66 episodes
2004	CSI: Crime Scene Investigation	Jessica Abernathy	Episode: "Bad Words"
2004	Angel in the Family	Sarah	TV movie
2005	CSI: Miami	Cheri Lyle Manning	Episode: "Recoil"
2006	Murder 101	Cheryl Collins	TV movie
2006	Criminal Minds	Marilyn Copeland	Episode: "What Fresh Hell?"
2006	The Last Miracle	Dr. Jacobs	Short film
2006	Without a Trace	Joanie McMurphy	Episode: "Shattered"
2007	Veronica Mars	Kathleen Barry	3 episodes
2010	The Last Harbor	Sarah Sharpe	
