= Bitter Harvest (1993 film) =

- Australian DVD cover
- Directed by: Duane Clark
- Written by: Randall Fontana
- Produced by: Gary Binkow; Steven Paul; Eric M. Breiman (line producer); Barry L. Collier (executive producer)
- Starring: Stephen Baldwin; Patsy Kensit; Jennifer Rubin
- Edited by: Paul Petschek
- Music by: Michael Tavera (as Mike Tavera)
- Production companies: Crystal Sky Worldwide, Prism Entertainment Corporation
- Distributed by: Prism Entertainment Corporation
- Release date: November 3, 1993
- Running time: 91 minutes
- Country: United States
- Language: English

Bitter Harvest is a 1993 thriller drama film directed by Duane Clark and starring Stephen Baldwin, Patsy Kensit and Jennifer Rubin. The film was released on November 3, 1993, and was filmed at Greenfield Ranch in Thousand Oaks, California.

== Background ==
The film stars Stephen Baldwin as Travis, Patsy Kensit as Jolene and Jennifer Rubin as Kelly Ann. Others in the film include Adam Baldwin as Bobby, M. Emmet Walsh as Sheriff Bob, James Crittenden as Lester, Art Evans as Earl Yates, Joanna Jackson as Lutie Yates, Ed Morgan as Judge Henry McGrath and David Powledge as Andrew Taylor.

The film was originally released on VHS in the US, where it remains out-of-print, never released on DVD. It is available on Amazon Prime. An all-region Australian import DVD was later released, as well as a Spanish import DVD, and a Dutch import DVD.

The film's tagline reads "A triangle of innocence, sin ... and murder."

== Plot ==
Travis Graham is a lonely and rather feeble minded uneducated young man whose abusive father recently died, but who left all of his money to a TV preacher but left Travis his valuable coin collection and his large farm in Texas. One day, a young woman, named Kelly Ann Welsh, walks into his life. At the same time, another attractive blonde claiming to be from England, named Jolene, starts taking an interest in Travis after supposedly wanting to buy the farm. Both women are secretly after something, but impressionable Travis, in need of emotional aid and comfort after the death of his father, finds himself the object of the girls' attentions. Even when he realizes he is being played for a fool he does not have the inclination to escape the ladies' clutches and things begin to take a sinister turn when both Kelly Ann and Jolene persuade Travis to partake in bank robberies with them around town and Travis is too gullible to refuse. When their actions attract the suspicions of the local deputy, both women will resort to murder to keep their game in play.

The climatic twist of the film comes when both Kelly Ann and Jolene are revealed to be sisters (Jolene is also not from England, but from Alabama) who have been plotting this whole scam to steal Travis father's money along with keeping their stolen bank cash for themselves. Travis realizes this only after learning that they murdered Deputy Bobby, and in the struggle he shoots and wounds Jolene, but is wounded in return by Kelly Ann who does away with him. Both women dispose of Travis' body in a furnace and having completed their goal, leave the farm in Travis' convertible automobile for places unknown to find, scam and murder their next unsuspecting victim.

== Cast ==
- Stephen Baldwin as Travis
- Patsy Kensit as Jolene
- Jennifer Rubin as Kelly Ann
- Adam Baldwin as Bobby
- M. Emmet Walsh as Sheriff Bob
- James Crittenden as Lester
- Art Evans as Earl Yates
- Joanna Jackson as Lutie Yates
- Ed Morgan as Judge Henry McGrath
- David Powledge as Andrew Taylor
- Jim Lovelett as Rip
- William Dennis Hurley as Two Pines Bank Teller
- Bonnie Paul as Astonville Bank Teller
- Kandra King as Hurley Bank Teller
- Jeff Yesko as Two Pines Bank Guard
- Wally Rose as Hurley Bank Guard
- Michael R. Long as Police Officer
- Gary Robertson as Travis' Father
- Clayton E. Robertson as Young Travis
- Eric M. Breiman as the Rancher (uncredited)

== Reception ==
Hal Erickson of Allmovie gave the film three out of five stars, stating "When the call went out for a Baldwin, Stephen answered and was cast in the lead of Bitter Harvest. Patsy Kensit and Jennifer Rubin costar as a pair of oversexed young ladies who get their jollies by victimizing their male lovers. Wide-eyed Baldwin, in need of emotional aid and comfort after the death of his father, finds himself the object of the girls' attentions. Even when he realizes he's being played for a chump, Baldwin hasn't got the inclination to escape the ladies' clutches. And then things take a sinister turn."

Chris Parry of EFilmCritic gave the film one and a half stars out of five, stating "Sure, Stephen Baldwin isn't generally a name you associate with movies that make a lot of sense (Usual Suspects notwithstanding), but this thing is so totally boring and unrealistic that it's really hard to watch. If not for the nudity of the gals (which, granted, is very nice and very prevalent), there'd honestly be nothing else to watch here but Baldwin's mullet. The direction, by TV hack Duane Clark, manages to introduce tons of sub-plots (such as flashbacks to a mysterious robed figure) then completely ignore them for the remainder of the film. The continual staring of Baldwin's character at a badly painted portrait of a stern old dude would be far less funny if they weren't accompanied by 'mysterious music' that leaves you wondering when the painting's eyes are going to move. They never do, though yours will. They'll roll back into your head if you sit through this dreck."

Scoopy gave an unfavorable review and wrote "Bitter Harvest is a bad erotic thriller. There was a time I lost all interest in where the plot was going, and the nudity was over by then as well."

For the DVD & Video Guide 2005, authors Mick Martin and Marsha Porter gave a rating of two stars out of five and wrote "Baldwin is good, but excessive subplots lessen the film's impact." The book VideoHound's Golden Movie Retriever gave a rating of two out of five stars.
