= 1992 Stinkers Bad Movie Awards =

15th award ceremony to honor bad films

The 1992 (15th) Stinkers Bad Movie Awards was released by the Hastings Bad Cinema Society in 1993 to honor 1992's worst films. The sole category was Worst Picture. It included a list of films that were considered for the final list, but ultimately failed to make the cut (16 films in total). This was the last year that featured only Worst Picture nominees.

== Nominees ==
Film	Production company(s)
Shining Through	20th Century Fox
Christopher Columbus: The Discovery	Warner Bros.
Newsies	Walt Disney Pictures
Stop! Or My Mom Will Shoot	Universal Pictures
Toys	20th Century Fox

=== Dishonorable Mentions ===
- Alien 3 (Fox)
- Basic Instinct (TriStar)
- Batman Returns (Warner Bros.)
- The Bodyguard (Warner Bros.)
- Cool World (Paramount)
- Encino Man (Hollywood)
- Final Analysis (Warner Bros.)
- Folks! (Fox)
- 1492: Conquest of Paradise (Paramount)
- Frozen Assets (RKO)
- Hoffa (Fox)
- Man Trouble (Fox)
- Medicine Man (Hollywood, Cinergi)
- A Stranger Among Us (Hollywood)
- Twin Peaks: Fire Walk With Me (New Line)
- Wild Orchid II: Two Shades of Blue (Triumph)
