= 13th Golden Raspberry Awards =

Award for worst cinematic under-achievements in 1992

- Date: March 28, 1993
- Site: Hollywood Roosevelt Hotel, California

Highlights
- Worst Picture: Shining Through
- Most awards: Shining Through and Stop! Or My Mom Will Shoot (3)
- Most nominations: The Bodyguard (7)

The 13th Golden Raspberry Awards were held on March 28, 1993, at the Hollywood Roosevelt Hotel to recognize the worst the movie industry had to offer in 1992. Shining Through and Stop! Or My Mom Will Shoot each won three Razzies, though the latter wasn't nominated for Worst Picture. Tom Selleck did not attend the ceremony and later accepted his award on The Chevy Chase Show.

Alan Menken, who wrote the music for the Razzie-winning song "High Times, Hard Times" from Newsies, also received the Academy Award for Best Original Song for "A Whole New World" from Aladdin in 1993, making him the first person to receive a Razzie and Oscar in the same year, a feat not repeated until screenwriter Brian Helgeland in 1998.

== Awards and nominations ==
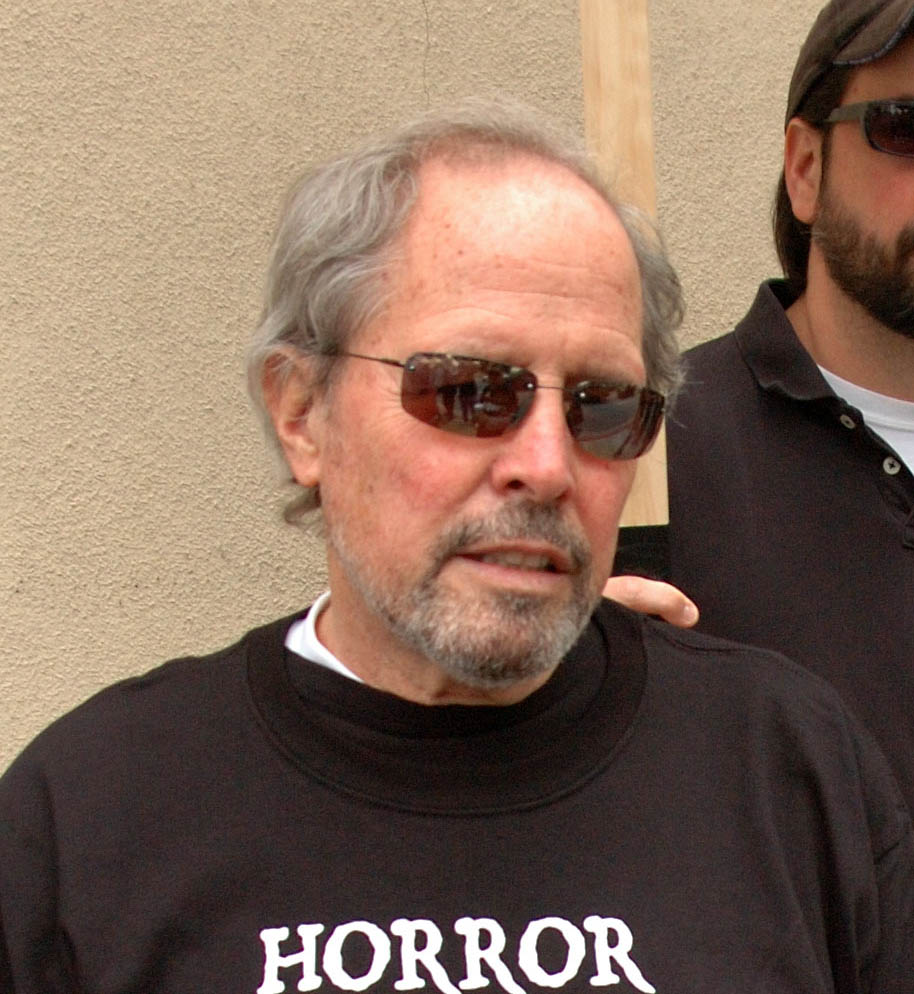
David Seltzer, Worst Director winner.

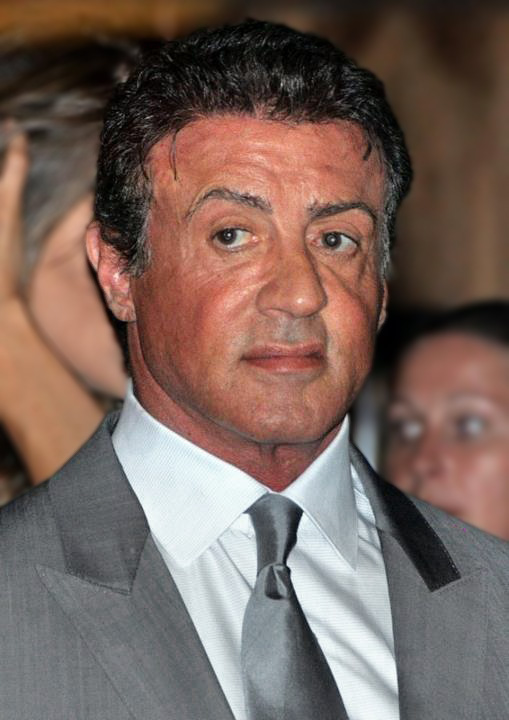
Sylvester Stallone, Worst Actor winner.

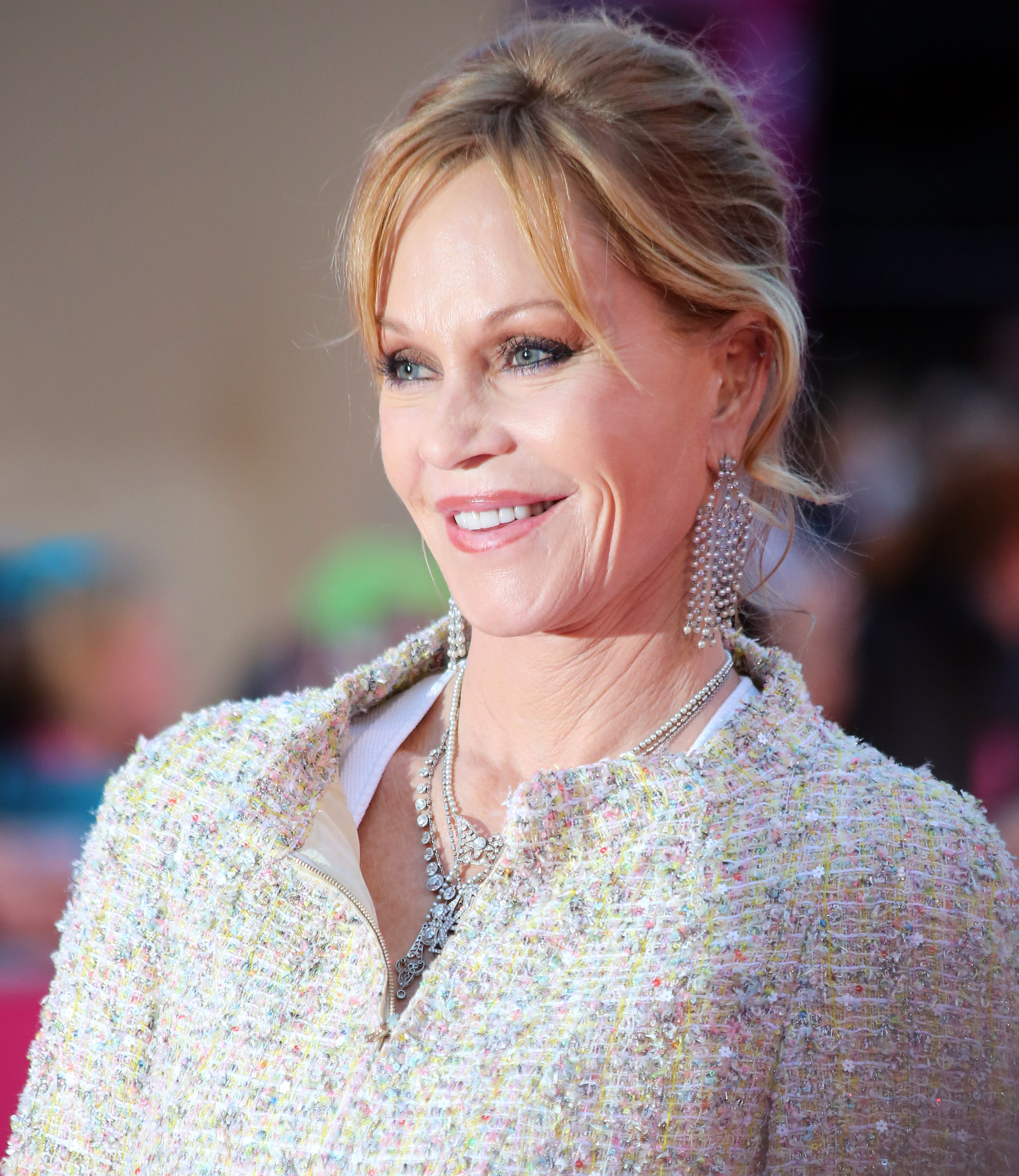
Melanie Griffith, Worst Actress winner.

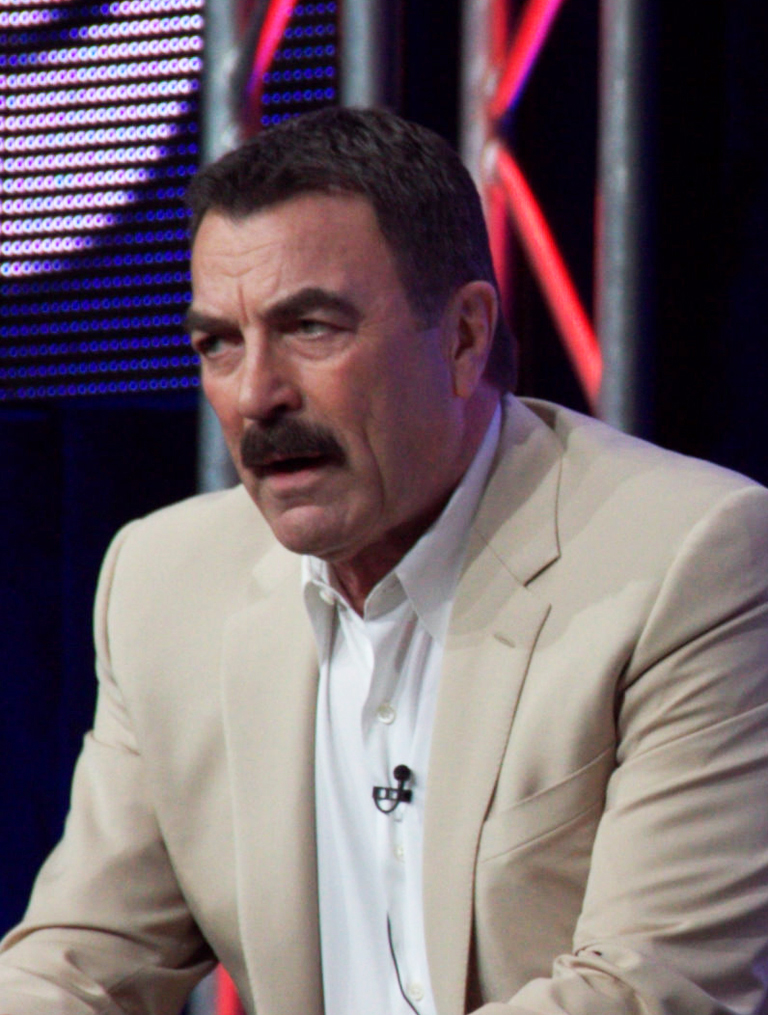
Tom Selleck, Worst Supporting Actor winner.

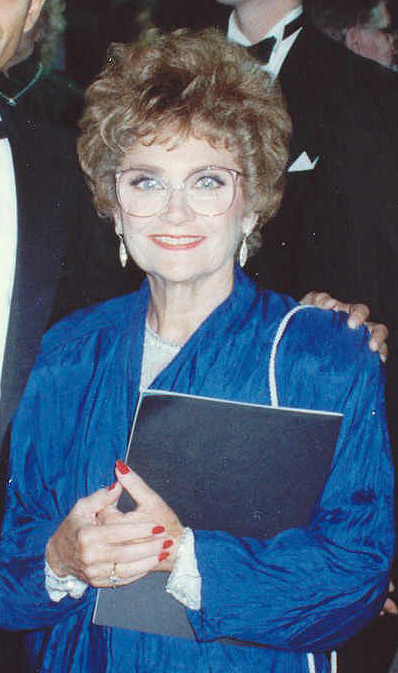
Estelle Getty, Worst Supporting Actress winner.

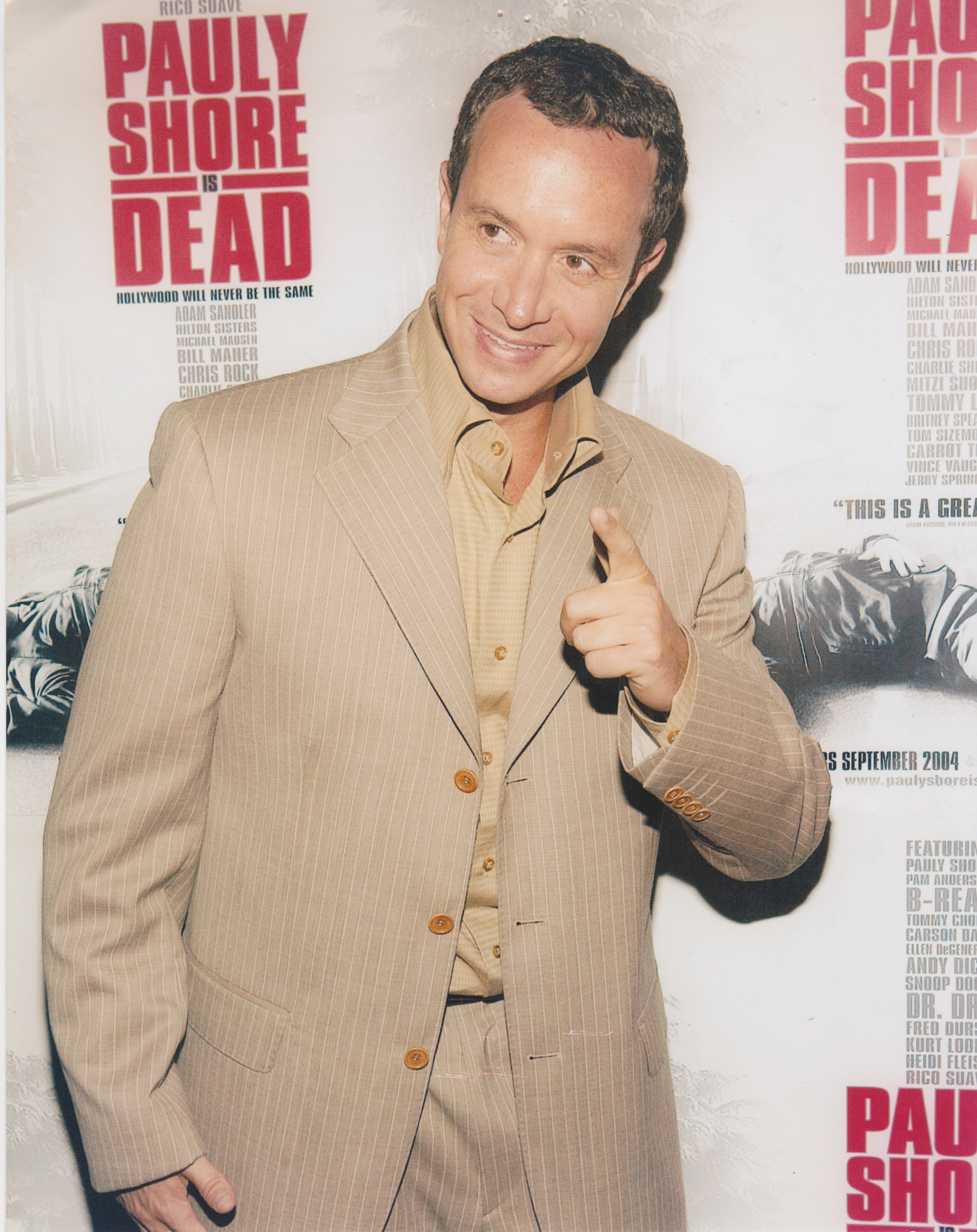
Pauly Shore, Worst New Star winner.

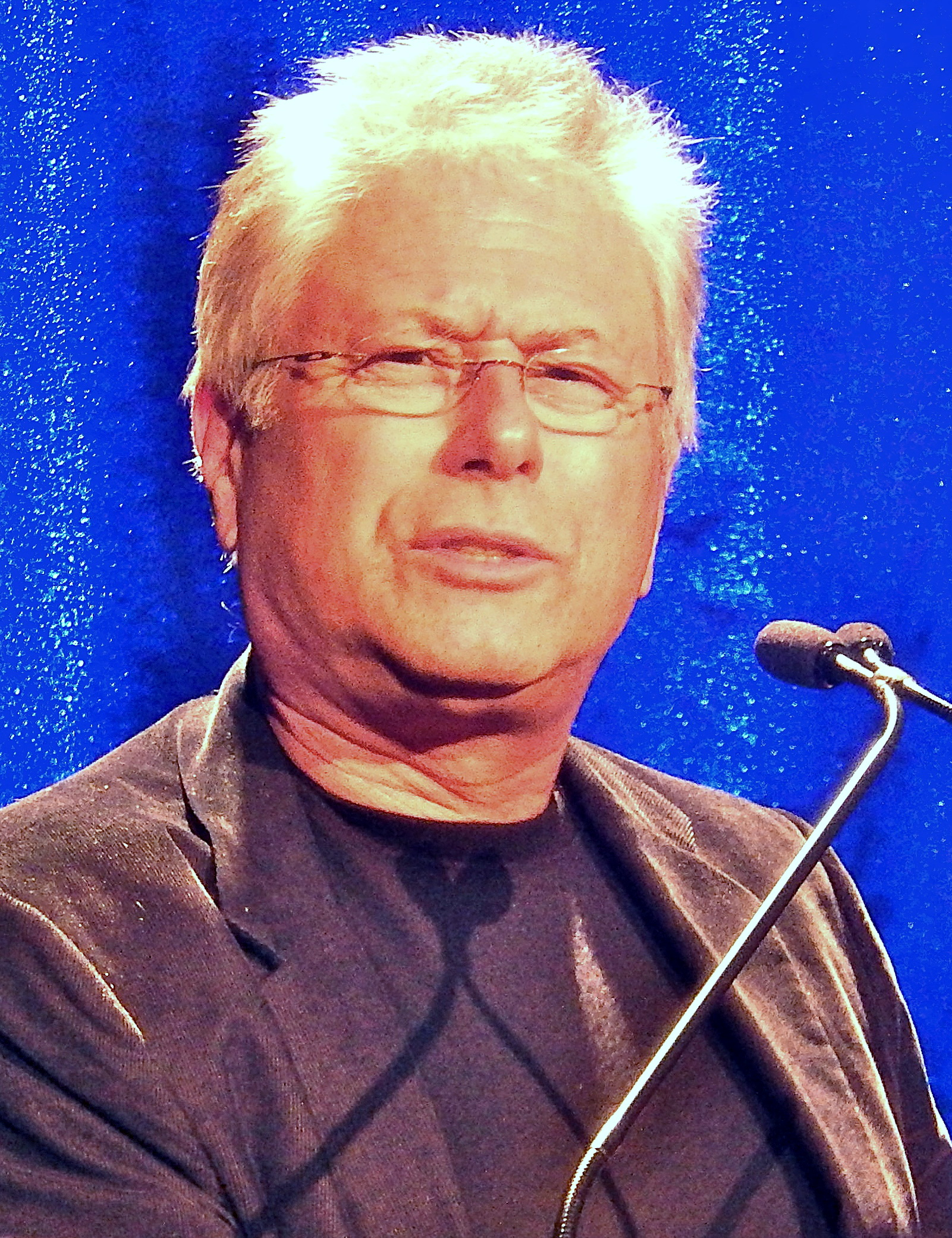
Alan Menken, Worst Original Song co-winner.
Winner (in bold)

Category	Recipient	Ref.
Worst Picture	**Shining Through (Fox)**	
Worst Picture	The Bodyguard (Warner Bros.)	
Worst Picture	Christopher Columbus: The Discovery (Warner Bros.)	
Worst Picture	Final Analysis (Warner Bros.)	
Worst Picture	Newsies (Disney)	
Worst Actor	**Sylvester Stallone** in **Stop! Or My Mom Will Shoot as Sgt. Joe Bomowski**	
Worst Actor	Kevin Costner in The Bodyguard as Frank Farmer	
Worst Actor	Michael Douglas in Basic Instinct and Shining Through as Det. Nick Curran and Ed Leland (respectively)	
Worst Actor	Jack Nicholson in Hoffa and Man Trouble as Jimmy Hoffa and Harry Bliss (respectively) (Nicholson was also Golden Globe nominated for Hoffa)	
Worst Actor	Tom Selleck in Folks! as Jon Aldrich	
Worst Actress	**Melanie Griffith** in **Shining Through** and **A Stranger Among Us as Linda Voss and Emily Eden (respectively)**	
Worst Actress	Kim Basinger in Cool World and Final Analysis as Holli Would and Heather Evans (respectively)	
Worst Actress	Lorraine Bracco in Medicine Man and Traces of Red as Dr. Rae Crane and Ellen Schofield (respectively)	
Worst Actress	Whitney Houston in The Bodyguard as Rachel Marron	
Worst Actress	Sean Young in Love Crimes as Dana Greenway	
Worst Supporting Actor	**Tom Selleck** in **Christopher Columbus: The Discovery as King Ferdinand of Spain**	
Worst Supporting Actor	Alan Alda in Whispers in the Dark as Leo Green	
Worst Supporting Actor	Marlon Brando in Christopher Columbus: The Discovery as Tomas de Torquemada	
Worst Supporting Actor	Danny DeVito in Batman Returns as Oswald Cobblepot/The Penguin	
Worst Supporting Actor	Robert Duvall in Newsies as Joseph Pulitzer	
Worst Supporting Actress	**Estelle Getty** in **Stop! Or My Mom Will Shoot as Mrs. Tutti Bomowski**	
Worst Supporting Actress	Ann-Margret in Newsies as Medda Larkson	
Worst Supporting Actress	Tracy Pollan in A Stranger Among Us as Mara	
Worst Supporting Actress	Jeanne Tripplehorn in Basic Instinct as Dr. Beth Garner	
Worst Supporting Actress	Sean Young in Once Upon a Crime as Phoebe	
Worst Director	**David Seltzer** for **Shining Through**	
Worst Director	Danny DeVito for Hoffa	
Worst Director	John Glen for Christopher Columbus: The Discovery	
Worst Director	Barry Levinson for Toys	
Worst Director	Kenny Ortega for Newsies	
Worst Screenplay	**Stop! Or My Mom Will Shoot, written by Blake Snyder, William Osborne, & William Davies**	
Worst Screenplay	The Bodyguard, written by Lawrence Kasdan	
Worst Screenplay	Christopher Columbus: The Discovery, screenplay by John Briley, Cary Bates and Mario Puzo	
Worst Screenplay	Final Analysis, screenplay by Wesley Strick, story by Robert H. Berger and Wesley Strick	
Worst Screenplay	Shining Through, screenplay by David Seltzer, based on the novel by Susan Isaacs	
Worst New Star	**Pauly Shore** in **Encino Man as Stanley "Stoney" Brown**	
Worst New Star	Georges Corraface in Christopher Columbus: The Discovery as Christopher Columbus	
Worst New Star	Kevin Costner's crew cut in The Bodyguard	
Worst New Star	Whitney Houston in The Bodyguard as Rachel Marron	
Worst New Star	Sharon Stone's tribute to Theodore Cleaver in Basic Instinct	
Worst Original Song	**"High Times, Hard Times" from Newsies, music by Alan Menken, lyrics by Jack Feldman**	
Worst Original Song	"Book of Days" from Far and Away, music by Enya, lyrics by Roma Ryan	
Worst Original Song	"Queen of the Night" from The Bodyguard, written by Whitney Houston, L.A. Reid, Babyface and Daryl Simmons	

== Films with multiple nominations ==
These films received multiple nominations:

Nominations	Films
7	The Bodyguard
6	Christopher Columbus: The Discovery
5	Newsies
5	Shining Through
3	Basic Instinct
3	Final Analysis
3	Stop! Or My Mom Will Shoot
2	Hoffa
2	A Stranger Among Us

=== Films with multiple wins ===
These films received multiple awards:

Wins	Films
3	Shining Through
3	Stop! Or My Mom Will Shoot

== Criticism ==
The awards was criticized for the nomination to Danny DeVito's well-received performance as The Penguin in Batman Returns for Worst Supporting Actor.

== See also ==
- 1992 in film
- 65th Academy Awards
- 46th British Academy Film Awards
- 50th Golden Globe Awards
