= Final Analysis =

1992 film by Phil Joanou

- Theatrical release poster
- Directed by: Phil Joanou
- Screenplay by: Wesley Strick
- Story by: Robert H. Berger; Wesley Strick
- Produced by: Charles Roven; Tony Thomas; Paul Junger Witt
- Starring: Richard Gere; Kim Basinger; Uma Thurman; Eric Roberts
- Cinematography: Jordan Cronenweth
- Edited by: Thom Noble
- Music by: George Fenton
- Production companies: Warner Bros.; Roven-Cavallo Entertainment
- Distributed by: Warner Bros.
- Release date: February 7, 1992
- Running time: 124 minutes
- Country: United States
- Language: English
- Box office: $75 million

Final Analysis is a 1992 American neo-noir erotic thriller film directed by Phil Joanou and written by Wesley Strick from a concept by forensic psychiatrist Robert H. Berger. It stars Richard Gere, Kim Basinger, Uma Thurman, Eric Roberts, Keith David and Paul Guilfoyle. The executive producers were Gere and Maggie Wilde. The film received mixed critical reviews, but was positively compared to the works of Alfred Hitchcock, particularly Vertigo. It was the final film of director of photography Jordan Cronenweth.

== Plot ==
Psychiatrist Isaac Barr treats Diana Baylor for obsessive–compulsive disorder. Diana suggests Isaac meet her sister, Heather Evans, who may be able to shed light on her neuroses. Heather tells him that Diana was sexually abused by their father after their mother left. Their father died in a fire, which Diana was suspected of starting. Heather further reveals that she is unhappily married to gangster Jimmy Evans. Isaac and Heather eventually have sex.

At a restaurant with Jimmy, Heather has an episode of "pathological intoxication" after drinking wine and is taken to the hospital. After recovering, she sneaks away with Isaac to an abandoned lighthouse. While climbing the stairs, she drops her purse and lets loose a metal dumbbell handle, which she claims she keeps for protection.

Isaac's friend, defense attorney Mike O'Brien, informs him that Jimmy is under federal investigation for financial crimes and warns Isaac to stay away from Heather. Isaac nevertheless follows her and Jimmy to a restaurant and confronts Jimmy. Claiming she feels ill, Heather leaves the restaurant, and gets a ride home from Isaac. Later, she drinks cough medicine, which brings on another episode. As Jimmy forces a kiss on her, she grabs one of his metal dumbbells and hits him over the head, killing him.

Heather is arrested for murdering Jimmy. Isaac hires Mike to represent her and enlists Dr. Alan Lowenthal, an expert witness on pathological intoxication, to testify on her behalf. Heather is found not guilty by reason of insanity. She is sentenced to confinement at a psychiatric facility, where she will be evaluated. Isaac assures Heather she will be released soon.

Isaac later hears of a patient of Sigmund Freud who had persistent dreams of arranging flowers, the same dream Diana had described to him during a session; Isaac realizes that she fabricated those stories. He talks to Hector, a bailiff who recognized Heather before her trial, and he recalls that she had been a spectator in the courthouse whenever Isaac testified as an expert witness. Mike tells Isaac that Jimmy's brother Anthony Evangelou recently died, making Heather the beneficiary of Jimmy's $4 million life insurance policy.

Isaac goes to the hospital to confront Heather, who admits to the ruse and threatens to incriminate him with the dumbbell she used to murder Jimmy, which has Isaac's fingerprints on it. Police detective Huggins, who suspects Isaac of killing Jimmy, reveals that he is being watched. Isaac tells Heather that he has reported to two assistant district attorneys who want to interview her. She agrees, confident that double jeopardy will protect her.

During the evaluation, Heather fabricates a story about Isaac killing Jimmy. At her request, Diana joins her but fails to bring the dumbbell; the investigators, meanwhile, are revealed to be psychiatrists. Heather loses her temper and threatens both Isaac and Diana and has to be sedated. Isaac meets with Diana, who assures him that she dropped the dumbbell into the bay but Isaac does not trust her. Isaac enlists Pepe Carrero, a former client, to follow Diana when she visits Heather.

Although Heather wants Diana to deliver the dumbbell to Huggins, Diana is too nervous to go through with it. Heather coerces her to switch clothes in the bathroom, allowing Heather to escape the hospital as "Diana". Pepe follows Heather and tries to steal the dumbbell but she shoots him in the chest. She telephones Huggins and arranges to meet him at a marina. Before going to the hospital, Pepe directs Isaac to the marina, where Isaac takes the dumbbell from Heather. She kidnaps both him and Huggins, and forces the latter to drive away from the marina.

A rainstorm hits and Huggins crashes into the ocean. Isaac escapes the sinking car and Heather follows him to the lighthouse. As she chases Isaac onto the balcony, he deduces that Heather was the one who was raped by her father, not Diana, and started the fire that killed him. Huggins appears to arrest Heather, who tries to shoot him. Isaac pulls her over the edge of the balcony, sending her falling to her death. Diana is tried as Heather's accomplice but is found not guilty. She then goes on a date with a wealthy man, posing as Heather.

== Cast ==
- Richard Gere as Dr. Isaac Barr
- Kim Basinger as Heather Evans
- Uma Thurman as Diana Baylor
- Eric Roberts as Jimmy Evans
- Keith David as Detective Huggins
- Paul Guilfoyle as Mike O'Brien
- Robert Harper as Dr. Alan Lowenthal
- Rita Zohar as Dr. Grusin
- Agustin Rodriguez as Pepe Carrero
- George Murdock as Judge Costello
- Shirley Prestia as D.A. Kaufman
- Tony Genaro as Hector
- Wood Moy as Dr. Lee
- Corey Fischer as Dr. Boyce
- Rico Alaniz as Hugo
- John Roselius as Sheriff's Deputy
- Erick Avari as Moderator (uncredited)
- Harris Yulin as ADA Donald Brakhage (uncredited)

== Production ==
Harold Becker, Joel Schumacher and John Boorman were variously attached as director. The original script was set in New York City, but was changed due to an ongoing union strike. San Francisco was chosen due to its "character" and iconic locations. The climax originally took place on the Golden Gate Bridge, but the sequence was re-written due to budget constraints. The climax instead took place at a lighthouse, filmed at Pigeon Point Lighthouse in Pescadero. Other filming locations included the San Francisco County Superior Court, the Letterman Army Hospital and the Kimpton Sir Francis Drake Hotel. Television comedy writer Susan Harris provided uncredited script rewrites.

== Reception ==
=== Box office ===
The first week's gross was $6,411,441 and the total receipts for the film's run were $28,590,665. In its widest release the film was featured in 1,504 theaters across the United States. The film grossed $47 million overseas for a worldwide gross of $75 million.

=== Critical response ===
Final Analysis has an approval rating at Rotten Tomatoes of 57% based on 30 reviews. On Metacritic, the film has a score of 40 out of 100 based on 23 reviews, indicating "mixed or average" reviews.

Roger Ebert gave the movie two and a half out of four stars. He liked the screenplay and thought director Alfred Hitchcock, known for these types of thrillers, would have liked it as well, though he thought the film was needlessly complex. Vincent Canby, film critic for The New York Times, praised the acting in the film and called Eric Roberts "the film's electrical force". Variety magazine called Final Analysis "a crackling good psychological melodrama" with "tantalizing double-crosses".

Kathleen Maher of the Austin Chronicle said the film does not live up to its influences and was critical of the leads Richard Gere and Kim Basinger, calling the buildup to their sex scene "excruciating". Rita Kempley, writing in The Washington Post, called the film "an implausible psycho thriller" and said director Phil Joanou "doesn't have any of his own ideas."

=== Accolades ===
==== Nominations ====
- MTV Movie Awards
  - Most Desirable Female, Kim Basinger (lost to Linda Hamilton for Terminator 2: Judgment Day)
- Golden Raspberry Awards
  - Worst Actress - Kim Basinger (also for Cool World; lost to Melanie Griffith for Shining Through and A Stranger Among Us)
  - Worst Picture - Charles Roven, Paul Junger Witt and Tony Thomas (lost to Shining Through)
  - Worst Screenplay - Wesley Strick (also story) and Robert Berger (story) (lost to Stop! or My Mom Will Shoot)
