= Shining Through (disambiguation) =

Shining Through is a 1992 World War II era film starring Melanie Griffiths and Michael Douglas.

Shining Through may also refer to:

- Shining Through (novel), the 1998 novel by Susan Isaacs on which the film is based
- Shining Through (album), a 2009 album by Gretchen Espina
- Shining Through, a 1991 gospel album by Jeff & Sheri Easter
- "Shining Through" (song), a 1993 song by Miki Howard
- "Shining Through", a song by God Is an Astronaut from the 2010 album Age of the Fifth Sun
