= Newsies =

1992 film by Kenny Ortega

- Theatrical release poster by John Alvin
- Directed by: Kenny Ortega
- Written by: Bob Tzudiker; Noni White
- Produced by: Michael Finnell
- Starring: Christian Bale; Bill Pullman; Ann-Margret; Robert Duvall
- Cinematography: Andrew Laszlo
- Edited by: William H. Reynolds
- Music by: Alan Menken; J. A. C. Redford
- Production companies: Walt Disney Pictures; Touchwood Pacific Partners I
- Distributed by: Buena Vista Pictures Distribution
- Release date: April 10, 1992
- Running time: 121 minutes
- Country: United States
- Language: English
- Budget: $15 million
- Box office: $2.8 million

Newsies is a 1992 American historical musical drama film produced by Walt Disney Pictures. Directed by choreographer Kenny Ortega and written by Bob Tzudiker and Noni White, it is loosely based on the New York City newsboys' strike of 1899. Featuring twelve original songs by Alan Menken with lyrics by Jack Feldman and an underscore by J. A. C. Redford, it stars Christian Bale, Bill Pullman, Ann-Margret and Robert Duvall.

The film received mixed reviews from critics, and was a box-office bomb, grossing $3 million against a $15 million budget. It later gained a cult following on home video, and was ultimately adapted into a stage musical on Broadway. The play was nominated for eight Tony Awards, winning two including Best Original Score for Menken and Feldman.

== Plot ==
In 1899, 17-year-old Jack "Cowboy" Kelly lives with other struggling newspaper hawkers ("newsies") in New York City, selling copies of the New York World on the Manhattan streets ("Carrying the Banner"). When David Jacobs and his younger brother Les join the group, Jack notices David's intelligence and Les' marketable cuteness and egotistically takes them under his wing. Unlike most newsies, the brothers work to financially support their family, as their father Mayer lost his factory job after being injured. Invited to the Jacobs' home for dinner, Jack becomes enamored with their sister Sarah. He later laments his isolation due to lacking his own family and fantasizes about traveling to New Mexico ("Santa Fe").

After New York World publisher Joseph Pulitzer raises the prices required for newsies to buy newspapers from his distribution centers, Jack and David angrily galvanize the other Manhattan newsies to go on strike ("The World Will Know"). While the others notify newsies in New York's other boroughs, Jack and Les confront Pulitzer, who ejects them from his office. Bryan Denton, a reporter for The Sun, takes an interest in the boys' story. Jack and David inform the Brooklyn newsies, whose leader, "Spot" Conlon, reluctantly opposes the strike. David motivates the dejected Manhattan newsies ("Seize the Day"), who consequently ambush the distribution center and destroy the newspapers. Pulitzer's enforcers, brothers Oscar and Morris Delancey, capture disabled newsie "Crutchy", who is placed in an orphanage and juvenile detention center called the Refuge, where the corrupt Warden Snyder neglects the orphans to embezzle money the city provides for their care.

The newsies attempt to deter strikebreakers, but the violent struggle is revealed as a trap set by the Delancey brothers. Before the newsies can be arrested, Spot Conlon arrives with the Brooklyn newsies and the two groups repel the mob. After Denton puts the story on the front page of The Sun, the ecstatic newsies imagine potential fame ("King of New York") before planning a rally. Snyder informs Pulitzer that Jack is an escapee from the Refuge, inspiring Pulitzer to have Jack arrested. During breakfast with Sarah atop the Jacobs' apartment building, Jack explains his desire to flee to Santa Fe, and wonders if she would miss him.

At sympathetic performer Medda Larkson's Bowery, Jack, David and Spot encourage the gathered newsies from across the city to stick together for their cause. Before they return to their own boroughs, Medda cheers them up with a song ("High Times, Hard Times"). The police arrive and arrest the newsies but Denton pays their legal fines. Snyder testifies against Jack, revealing that his real name is Francis Sullivan, his mother is deceased and his father incarcerated. Jack is sentenced to four years of rehabilitation in the Refuge, while Denton is reassigned as a war correspondent, unable to report on the strike. Pulitzer offers to waive Jack's sentence and pay him a salary if he works despite the strike; otherwise, he will have the other newsies thrown into the Refuge. The boys attempt to rescue Jack, who tells them to leave.

Though the newsies are shocked and dismayed to see Jack at work the next day, he rescues the Jacobs brothers when the Delanceys harass their sister and assault the boys, knowingly breaking his deal with Pulitzer. Denton notifies the newsies that their strike has not swayed public opinion, since the city thrives on child labor and Pulitzer has warned newspapers against reporting on the strike. Using an old printing press of Pulitzer's, they publish a "Newsie Banner" which they distribute to child laborers citywide ("Once and For All"). Denton shares the paper with Governor Theodore Roosevelt, exposing the mistreatment of children at the Refuge. Numerous child laborers join the strike, stalling the city's workforce. Jack and David confront Pulitzer, who finally concedes.

Roosevelt has Snyder arrested, releases the children from the Refuge, and thanks Jack for alerting him to the situation. He offers Jack a ride, and Jack asks to be taken to the train yards so he can head to Santa Fe. The newsies are disheartened by this, but Jack returns shortly, with Roosevelt having convinced him that he belongs in New York. As the newsies celebrate his return, Sarah and Jack kiss and Roosevelt returns Spot to Brooklyn.

== Cast ==
- Christian Bale as Jack "Cowboy" Kelly / Francis Sullivan
- David Moscow as David Jacobs
- Bill Pullman as Bryan Denton
- Gabriel Damon as "Spot" Conlon
- Ann-Margret as Medda Larkson
- Robert Duvall as Joseph Pulitzer
- Luke Edwards as Les Jacobs
- Max Casella as "Racetrack" Higgins
- Michael Lerner as "Wiesel"
- Marty Belafsky as Crutchy
- Aaron Lohr as "Mush"
- Trey Parker (Note: Not to be confused with the South Park co-creator of the same name) as Louis "Kid Blink" Baletti
- Arvie Lowe Jr. as "Boots"
- Kevin Tighe as Mister Snyder
- Charles Cioffi as Don Seitz
- Ele Keats as Sarah Jacobs
- Jeffrey DeMunn as Mayer Jacobs
- Deborra-Lee Furness as Esther Jacobs
- Dominic Lucero as Bumlets
- Robert Feeney as Snoddy
- Mark David as Specs
- Michael A. Goorjian as Skittery
- Shon Greenblatt as Oscar Delancey
- David Sheinkopf as Morris Delancey
- William Boyett as Judge E.A. "Movealong" Monahan
- Marc Lawrence as Mr. Kloppman
- Scott Caudill as Newsies Dancer
- David James Alexander as Theodore Roosevelt

== Production ==
Walt Disney Pictures tapped its film financing partner, Touchwood Pacific Partners, to fund the production of the film. The production had a $15 million budget. Alan Menken's longtime collaborator, Howard Ashman, was too sick from AIDS to work with Menken on this film, and he would eventually die on March 14, 1991. Menken brought in lyricist Jack Feldman to help.

The street scenes were filmed at Universal Studios, on the existing backlot New York Street area; this was the first feature to be filmed on the rebuilt New York Street set after the fire of 1990.

During production, multiple cast members also wrote, directed, and starred in a satire horror short film named Blood Drips Heavily on Newsie Square (alternatively Blood Drips Heavily on Newsies Square). The satire film featured Mark David as Don Knotts, a disgraced actor wanting to star in Newsies for his big career comeback; after being rejected by director Kenny Ortega, Knotts decides to murder everyone involved in Newsies production, including Ivan Dudynsky, Trey Parker, Max Casella and Michael A. Goorjian.

== Music ==
Newsies (Original Motion Picture Soundtrack)

Soundtrack album by Alan Menken, Jack Feldman and J.A.C. Redford
- Released: April 10, 1992
- Recorded: 1992
- Genre: Soundtrack
- Label: Walt Disney

No.	Title	Performer(s)	Length
1.	"Prologue"	Max Casella	0:48
2.	"Carrying the Banner"	Newsies Ensemble	6:15
3.	"Santa Fe"	Christian Bale	4:18
4.	"My Lovey-Dovey Baby"	Ann-Margret	1:30
5.	"Fightin' Irish: Strike Action"	J.A.C. Redford	1:50
6.	"The World Will Know"	Newsies Ensemble	3:20
7.	"Escape from Snyder"	Redford	2:08
8.	"Seize the Day"	Newsies Ensemble	2:01
9.	"King of New York"	Bill Pullman and Newsies Ensemble	2:25
10.	"High Times, Hard Times"	Newsies Ensemble/Ann Margret	2:54
11.	"Seize the Day (Chorale)"	Newsies Ensemble	1:12
12.	"Santa Fe (Reprise)"	Christian Bale	1:49
13.	"Rooftop"	Redford	3:13
14.	"Once and for All"	Newsies Ensemble	2:24
15.	"The World Will Know (Finale)"	Newsies Ensemble	1:50
16.	"Carrying the Banner (Finale)"	Newsies Ensemble	6:20

== Release ==
Newsies was released on April 10, 1992, via distributor Buena Vista Pictures. The film did not recoup its $15 million budget, making less than a fifth of that at the box office. Since then, Newsies has gained a measurable fan base.

In 1992, the film was released on Walt Disney Home Video, while a collector's edition DVD was released in 2002. Walt Disney Studios Home Entertainment re-released the film on DVD on May 30, 2006 and on Blu-ray, as a 20th Anniversary Edition, on June 19, 2012.

== Reception ==
=== Critical response ===
On Rotten Tomatoes, the film's average score is 39% based on 38 reviews, with an average rating of 5/10. The critical consensus reads: "Extra! Extra! Read all about Newsies instead of suffering through its underwhelming musical interludes, although Christian Bale makes for a spirited hero." On Metacritic, the film has a weighted average score of 46 out of 100, based on 19 critics, indicating "mixed or average reviews". Film critic and historian Leonard Maltin called it Howard the Paperboy, noting "This ambitious (up to a point) project is done in by a lackluster score, and by cramped production numbers that seem cheap despite the movie's hefty production budget -- not to mention its bloated running time."

=== Box office ===
The film grossed $2,819,485 domestically. The film did not recoup its $15 million budget, making less than a fifth of that at the box office. It also ranks among the lowest-grossing live-action films produced by the Walt Disney Studios. The film was pulled from many theaters after a poor opening weekend.

=== Accolades ===
Award	Category	Nominee(s)	Result
14th Youth in Film Awards	Outstanding Young Ensemble Cast in a Motion Picture	Christian Bale, David Moscow, Luke Edwards, Max Casella, Marty Belafsky, Arvie Lowe Jr., Aaron Lohr, Gabriel Damon, Shon Greenblatt & Ele Keats	Nominated
1992 Stinkers Bad Movie Awards	Worst Picture	Newsies	Nominated
13th Golden Raspberry Awards	Worst Original Song	"High Times, Hard Times" by Alan Menken & Jack Feldman	Won
13th Golden Raspberry Awards	Worst Picture	Newsies	Nominated
13th Golden Raspberry Awards	Worst Director	Kenny Ortega	Nominated
13th Golden Raspberry Awards	Worst Supporting Actor	Robert Duvall	Nominated
13th Golden Raspberry Awards	Worst Supporting Actress	Ann-Margret	Nominated

== Historical accuracy ==
The actual newsboys' strike of 1899 lasted from July 20 to August 2. The leader of the strike was a one-eyed young man named Louis Balletti, nicknamed "Kid Blink", who spoke with a heavy Brooklyn accent that was often phonetically transcribed when he was quoted by newspapers. Kid Blink is featured in the film as a minor supporting character played by Trey Parker, while the role of strike leader is given to the fictional Jack "Cowboy" Kelly (Christian Bale). Kid Blink and another real-life newsie, Morris Cohen, were the inspiration for Kelly. The actual strike ended with a compromise: the New York World and New York Journal agreed to buy back all unsold copies of the newspapers.

== Stage adaptation ==
Disney Theatrical Productions produced a stage musical based on the film that played at the Paper Mill Playhouse in Millburn, New Jersey starting on September 25, 2011 through October 16, starring Jeremy Jordan as Jack. Newsies!: The Musical contains songs from the film, as well as several new numbers.

The musical opened to previews on Broadway at the Nederlander Theatre for a limited engagement from March 15, 2012 to March 28, 2012, in previews from March 29, 2012 to June 10, 2012, in its official engagement. This was later extended through August 19, 2012 after the first weekend of previews and then extended again, this time to an open-ended run. The show went on to earn eight Tony Award nominations, including Best Musical, winning Best Choreography and Best Original Score at the 66th Tony Awards. The show closed on August 24, 2014, having played 1,004 performances.
