= Compromising Positions =

1985 film by Frank Perry

- Theatrical release poster
- Directed by: Frank Perry
- Screenplay by: Susan Isaacs
- Based on: Compromising Positions by Susan Isaacs
- Produced by: Frank Perry
- Starring: Susan Sarandon; Raúl Juliá; Edward Herrmann; Judith Ivey; Mary Beth Hurt; Anne De Salvo; Deborah Rush; Josh Mostel; Joe Mantegna
- Cinematography: Barry Sonnenfeld
- Edited by: Peter Frank
- Music by: Brad Fiedel
- Distributed by: Paramount Pictures
- Release date: August 30, 1985
- Running time: 99 minutes
- Country: United States
- Language: English
- Budget: $6 million
- Box office: $12,531,831

Compromising Positions is a 1985 American film released by Paramount Pictures and directed by Frank Perry. The screenplay, by Susan Isaacs, was adapted from her 1978 novel. The plot concerns Long Island housewife and former journalist Judith Singer, who becomes involved in a murder investigation.

The film stars Susan Sarandon, Raúl Juliá, Judith Ivey, Edward Herrmann, Mary Beth Hurt, Joe Mantegna, Deborah Rush, Anne De Salvo, and Josh Mostel. Joan Allen has a small role.

== Plot ==
Judith Singer is a former Newsday reporter who misses her old life, now that her husband Bob spends most of his time at work and her time at home on Long Island has become a bore.

When her dentist, Dr. Bruce Fleckstein, is found murdered, Judith sees the possibility of a story that she might be able to sell to the newspaper's editor, maybe even get her old job back. Judith might have been the last person to see Fleckstein alive, which makes detective David Suarez consider her both a possible witness and a suspect.

Fleckstein was a lecher and a louse. Decked out in gold jewelry, he cheated on his wife Phyllis and preyed on his female patients. Not only did Fleckstein have affairs in a motel with several of his patients, but he also took compromising Polaroids of many women while they were asleep in his dentist chair.

The murderer could have been sculptor Nancy Miller, or perhaps Judith's next-door neighbor Peg Tuccio, or any number of possibilities. Suarez is determined to solve the case before amateur detective Judith beats him to it.

== Cast ==
- Susan Sarandon as Judith Singer
- Raul Julia as David Suarez
- Edward Herrmann as Bob Singer
- Judith Ivey as Nancy Miller
- Mary Beth Hurt as Peg Tuccio
- Joe Mantegna as Dr. Bruce Fleckstein
- Anne De Salvo as Phyllis Fleckstein
- Deborah Rush as Brenda Dunck
- Josh Mostel as Dicky Dunck
- Joan Allen as Mary Alice Mahoney
- Jack Gilpin as Patrol Car Cop
- Tanya Berezin as Newsday Editor

== Reaction ==
The film is favorably reviewed in Hooked, Pauline Kael's ninth collection of movie reviews. She is especially complimentary about Susan Sarandon's performance: "The screenplay provides a batch of actresses with a chance to show some comic verve. Susan Sarandon's smile has never been more incredibly lush, and she does some inspired double takes - just letting her beautiful dark eyes pop... It's fun to have a movie about a woman whose curiosity is her salvation."

On the review aggregator website Rotten Tomatoes, 56% of 18 critics' reviews are positive.
