= Christopher Columbus: The Discovery =

1992 film by John Glen

- Theatrical release poster by John Alvin
- Directed by: John Glen
- Screenplay by: John Briley; Cary Bates; Mario Puzo
- Story by: Mario Puzo
- Produced by: Alexander Salkind; Ilya Salkind
- Starring: Marlon Brando; Tom Selleck; Georges Corraface; Rachel Ward; Robert Davi; Benicio del Toro
- Cinematography: Alec Mills
- Edited by: Matthew Glen
- Music by: Cliff Eidelman
- Production companies: Christopher Columbus Productions; Quinto Centenario
- Distributed by: Warner Bros. (United States and Spain); Rank Film Distributors (United Kingdom)
- Release dates: 21 August 1992 (U.S.); 11 September 1992 (UK); 18 September 1992 (Spain)
- Running time: 121 minutes
- Countries: United States; United Kingdom; Spain
- Language: English
- Budget: $45 million
- Box office: $8.6 million (US/UK)

Christopher Columbus: The Discovery is a 1992 historical adventure film directed by John Glen, starring Marlon Brando, Tom Selleck, Georges Corraface and Rachel Ward. It was the last project developed by the father and son production team of Alexander and Ilya Salkind. The film follows events after the fall of the Emirate of Granada (an Arab principality which was located in the south of Spain) and leads up to the voyage of Christopher Columbus to the New World in 1492.

Its behind-the-scenes history involved an elaborate series of financial mishaps, which later brought about an emotional falling-out between the Salkinds; as a frustrated Alexander Salkind would later lament in a November 1993 interview with the Los Angeles Times, "I know, after this, that I'll never make movies again."

The film was released for the 500th anniversary of Columbus' voyage. The premiere took place at almost exactly the same time as Ridley Scott's film 1492: Conquest of Paradise, which has often led to confusion between the two. Neither would be a critical or commercial success.

== Plot ==
Genoese navigator Christopher Columbus overcomes intrigue in the court of King Ferdinand and Queen Isabella of Spain and gains financing for his expedition to the West Indies, which eventually leads to the European colonization of the Americas.

== Cast ==
- Marlon Brando as Tomás de Torquemada
- Tom Selleck as King Ferdinand V
- Georges Corraface as Christopher Columbus
- Rachel Ward as Queen Isabella I
- Robert Davi as Martín Pinzón
- Catherine Zeta-Jones as Beatriz Enriquez de Arana
- Oliver Cotton as Harana
- Benicio del Toro as Alvaro Harana
- Mathieu Carrière as King John II of Portugal
- Manuel de Blas as Vicente Pinzon
- Glyn Grain as De La Cosa
- Peter Guinness as Fra Perez
- Nigel Terry as Roldan
- Simon Dormandy as Bives
- Michael Gothard as Inquisitor's Spy
- Branscombe Richmond as Indian Chieftain
- Christopher Chaplin as Rodrigo de Escobedo
- Hugo Blick as De Torres

== Production ==
The initial director George P. Cosmatos left the production due to "creative differences", with Cosmatos later suing the producers for millions with the matter settled out-of-court. Cosmatos was then replaced by John Glen shortly before shooting began. At one point during the production, the $42 million budget was being slashed with the producers considering scrapping the theatrical approach in favor of a TV miniseries. However, this was alleviated when Ilya Salkind was able to secure a budget of $50 million.

=== Casting ===
Marlon Brando received $5 million for the film, and his name remains in the credits despite his request that it be removed. Following Cosmatos' departure as director, actors Timothy Dalton and Isabella Rossellini soon followed suit with Dalton later filing a lawsuit against the producers for breach of contract and fraud, stating that they did not provide a bank guarantee for his $2.5 million salary.

== Reception ==
=== Box office ===
The film was not a commercial success, debuting at number 4 at the US box office and grossing $8.3 million in the United States and Canada. It grossed $500,000 in the United Kingdom.

=== Critical response ===
Roger Ebert criticized Brando and gave the movie one out of four stars, stating "This movie takes one of history's great stories and treats it in such a lackluster manner that Columbus's voyage seems as endless to us as it did to his crew." It is also on his "Most Hated" list. Brando's performance, in particular, was singled out as his "worst" by critic Paul Brenner of Artistdirect.

Vincent Canby of The New York Times called the picture "expensive, sloppy and, at its most ambitious, a frail reminder of the Warner Brothers swashbucklers that Michael Curtiz used to turn out with Errol Flynn." Peter Rainer of the Los Angeles Times said "it's not politically correct. It's also not cinematically correct, humanly correct or historically correct. With one possible exception: The reconstructed versions of the Nina, Pinta and Santa Maria look pretty correct—more so at least than the actors who sail them." A Newsweek reviewer called the film a "characterless movie that seems to have been made for no better reason than the marketing ploy of a 500th anniversary." Film critic and historian Leonard Maltin declared the picture a "BOMB" (he gave 1492: Conquest of Paradise an only-slightly better rating, and conveyed his sentiments with this variation on the popular rhyme: "In nineteen-hundred-and-ninety-two, Columbus sailed two screen boo-boos.")...adding that the movie was hardly ripe for re-discovery, and lamenting "Is this any way to celebrate the 500th anniversary of Europe's finding America?"

The film received mostly negative reviews on Rotten Tomatoes, with a rotten 7% rating based on 29 reviews, with the website's critical consensus reading "Ironically, for a biopic about a voyage many associate with people accepting that the world is round, Christopher Columbus: The Discovery falls completely flat." Audiences surveyed by CinemaScore gave the film a grade of "C" on scale of A+ to F.

== Awards ==
Tom Selleck won the Golden Raspberry Award for Worst Supporting Actor. Marlon Brando was also nominated for Worst Supporting Actor and the film received another four Golden Raspberry Award nominations including; Worst Picture, Worst Director – John Glen, Worst New Star – Georges Corraface and Worst Screenplay – Mario Puzo at the 13th Golden Raspberry Awards. At the 1992 Stinkers Bad Movie Awards, it received a nomination for Worst Picture.

== Lawsuits ==
Director Ridley Scott had considered making a Christopher Columbus film for the Salkinds, but instead opted to direct a rival project from producer Alain Goldman and written by Roselyne Bosch: 1492: Conquest of Paradise. The Salkinds filed a lawsuit against Scott, alleging that the director stole ideas from their project. Forty million dollars in damages was sought, in addition to a ruling barring Scott from proceeding with the Goldman-backed film. Throughout November 1990, various contemporary sources pointed out that the scripts for the two projects were rumored to be quite different: Scott's "biopic" would survey twenty-three years of Christopher Columbus's life, while Salkind's "adventure-epic" would focus on the singular event of his 1492 voyage. Six months after filing the lawsuit against Scott, the Salkinds decided to abandon it. Goldman and Salkind acknowledged that releasing two films on the same subject at approximately the same time could split audiences and box office returns, but with both Columbus pictures angling for a release date to coincide with the 500-year anniversary, the conflict seemed unavoidable.

In September 1994, producer Ilya Salkind, along with Sakind's wife and the film's executive producer Jane Chaplin, sued his father Alexander Salkind, co-producer Bob Simmonds and other creditors for $10 million.

== Home media ==
The film was released on VHS and LaserDisc formats from Warner Home Video in 1993. It has not been released on DVD in North America, but is available in other format regions on DVD.

== See also ==
- 1492: Conquest of Paradise, another big budget, all-star epic about Columbus released in 1992.
- Carry On Columbus, a comedy film about Columbus also released in 1992.
- The Magic Voyage, an animated film about Columbus also released in 1992.
