= The Bodyguard (1992 film) =

Film by Mick Jackson

- Theatrical release poster
- Directed by: Mick Jackson
- Written by: Lawrence Kasdan
- Produced by: Kevin Costner; Lawrence Kasdan; Jim Wilson
- Starring: Kevin Costner; Whitney Houston; Gary Kemp; Bill Cobbs; Ralph Waite
- Cinematography: Andrew Dunn
- Edited by: Donn Cambern; Richard A. Harris
- Music by: Alan Silvestri
- Production companies: Tig Productions; Kasdan Pictures
- Distributed by: Warner Bros.
- Release dates: November 23, 1992 (Mann's Chinese Theater); November 25, 1992 (United States)
- Running time: 129 minutes
- Country: United States
- Language: English
- Budget: $25 million
- Box office: $411 million

The Bodyguard is a 1992 American romantic thriller drama film directed by Mick Jackson, and written by Lawrence Kasdan, who produced it with Kevin Costner and Jim Wilson. Starring Costner, Whitney Houston (in her feature film acting debut), Gary Kemp, Bill Cobbs, and Ralph Waite, the film follows Frank Farmer, a former United States Secret Service agent turned bodyguard, who is hired to protect Rachel Marron, a famous actress and singer, from an unknown stalker. Despite initially disliking each other, Frank saves Rachel from close calls and the two unexpectedly forge a passionate bond.

Kasdan wrote the film in the mid-1970s, with the original intention to have it turned into a vehicle for Steve McQueen and Diana Ross before McQueen pulled out of negotiations and Ryan O'Neal took his place. However, after Ross backed off the project due to issues with the script, development was delayed until 1985 when Costner took interest in the script. Filming took place from November 1991 to March 1992, with a $25 million budget.

The Bodyguard was theatrically released by Warner Bros. Pictures in the United States on November 25, 1992, after premiering at the Mann's Chinese Theater two days earlier. Upon its release, the film received mixed-to-negative reviews from critics but was a commercial success, grossing $411 million worldwide, becoming the second highest-grossing film of 1992 and began Houston's successful foray into films. At the time, it was ranked the tenth highest-grossing film in box office history. The film was notable for its positive portrayal of an interracial couple without bringing attention to that aspect, breaking a major barrier in Hollywood at the time.

The film's accompanying soundtrack by Houston became the best-selling soundtrack album of all time, with sales of over 45 million copies worldwide, and won the Grammy Award for Album of the Year. The lead single "I Will Always Love You" achieved unprecedented worldwide success, selling over 24 million copies worldwide, and is the best-selling single by a female artist of all time. The other singles "I Have Nothing" and "Run to You" received nominations for the Academy Award for Best Original Song.

The film received seven nominations at the 13th Golden Raspberry Awards, including for Worst Picture, Worst Actor (for Costner) and Worst Actress (for Houston). In spite of the Razzies, Houston received best acting nominations at the People's Choice Awards, MTV Movie & TV Awards and the NAACP Image Awards. Billboard later listed Houston's performance in the film as the 27th best performance of a musician in a box-office film. The film has since been reevaluated by critics and described as a "romantic classic".

== Plot ==
Rachel Marron, an Academy Award–nominated actress and music superstar, is receiving death threats from a stalker. After a bomb explodes in her dressing room, her manager Bill Devaney seeks out professional bodyguard Frank Farmer, a former Secret Service agent who served on the Jimmy Carter and Ronald Reagan presidential details, to protect her.

Frank reluctantly accepts Devaney's offer but feels Rachel is a spoiled diva oblivious to the threats against her life. She soon accuses Frank of being paranoid, complaining that his extensive protection techniques are intrusive. However, he and Rachel grow closer when he rescues her from danger after a riot erupts at one of her concerts. Her existing bodyguard, Tony Scipelli, resents Frank's presence, leading to a physical altercation in Rachel's kitchen.

Though Frank tries to remain professional, he and Rachel sleep together. The next day, he breaks off the affair, realizing it compromises his ability to protect her. Hurt, she begins to defy Frank's security measures. Then, to make him jealous, Rachel flirts with his former Secret Service colleague, Greg Portman, whom she meets at a Miami party but then rebuffs due to Portman being aggressively assertive.

When her stalker threatens her with a phone call, Rachel finally recognizes the seriousness of the situation and her need to trust Frank completely. Frank, Rachel, her son Fletcher, her older sister Nicki and her driver Henry, then travel to a large lakefront cabin in the mountains, the home of Frank's father, Herb.

The next day, Frank rescues Fletcher from a small motorboat just before it explodes. After he secures the house for the night, a drunken Nicki, upset that Fletcher could have died, admits she had hired a hitman to kill Rachel during a fit of jealousy. However, the letters from the stalker had come before that. Nicki has already paid in full and does not know the killer's identity. Abruptly, the hitman breaks into the dark house and fatally shoots Nicki. Frank pursues the killer into the woods; he shoots at them, misses and the assailant escapes. He then learns that the stalker Dan had been apprehended earlier that day and was in custody when Nicki was killed.

A few days after Nicki's funeral, the Academy Awards ceremony occurs. Frank gives Rachel a panic button in the shape of a cross to immediately alert him to any trouble. Despite this, many backstage technical issues hamper Frank's efforts to monitor the proceedings closely. While presenting an award, Rachel freezes and runs offstage, angry at Frank for embarrassing her with overprotective measures.

Later, Rachel is announced as the winner for Best Actress. As she comes on stage to accept the award, Portman is revealed to be the hitman, masquerading as the bodyguard for the ceremony's host. Frank notices Portman pointing a gun disguised as a camera at Rachel and preparing for the fatal shot. He runs onstage, leaps in front of Rachel and takes the bullet meant for her. As chaos erupts amongst the audience, Portman targets Rachel again, only to be shot and killed by Frank. While Rachel urges Frank to remain conscious and calls for help, he slowly passes out.

Frank recovers from the shooting and bids farewell to Rachel at the airport, both knowing their relationship would never work out. After the plane starts to take off, Rachel suddenly orders the plane to stop, jumps out and runs to Frank for one last passionate kiss. Some time later, Rachel performs "I Will Always Love You" on a stage, while elsewhere Frank is at an annual dinner, keeping a vigilant eye on his next assignment. A minister is seen holding a cross similar to the one he gave Rachel.

== Cast ==
- Kevin Costner as Frank Farmer
- Whitney Houston as Rachel Marron
- Gary Kemp as Sy Spector
- Bill Cobbs as Bill Devaney
- Ralph Waite as Herb Farmer
- Tomas Arana as Greg Portman
- Michele Lamar Richards as Nicki Marron
- Mike Starr as Tony Scipelli
- Christopher Birt as Henry Adams
- DeVaughn Nixon as Fletcher Marron
- Gerry Bamman as Ray Court
- Tony Pierce as Dan
- Robert Wuhl as Oscars Host
- Richard Schiff as Skip Thomas
- Chris Connelly as Himself
- Debbie Reynolds as Herself
- David Foster as Oscars Conductor

== Production ==
=== Pre-production ===
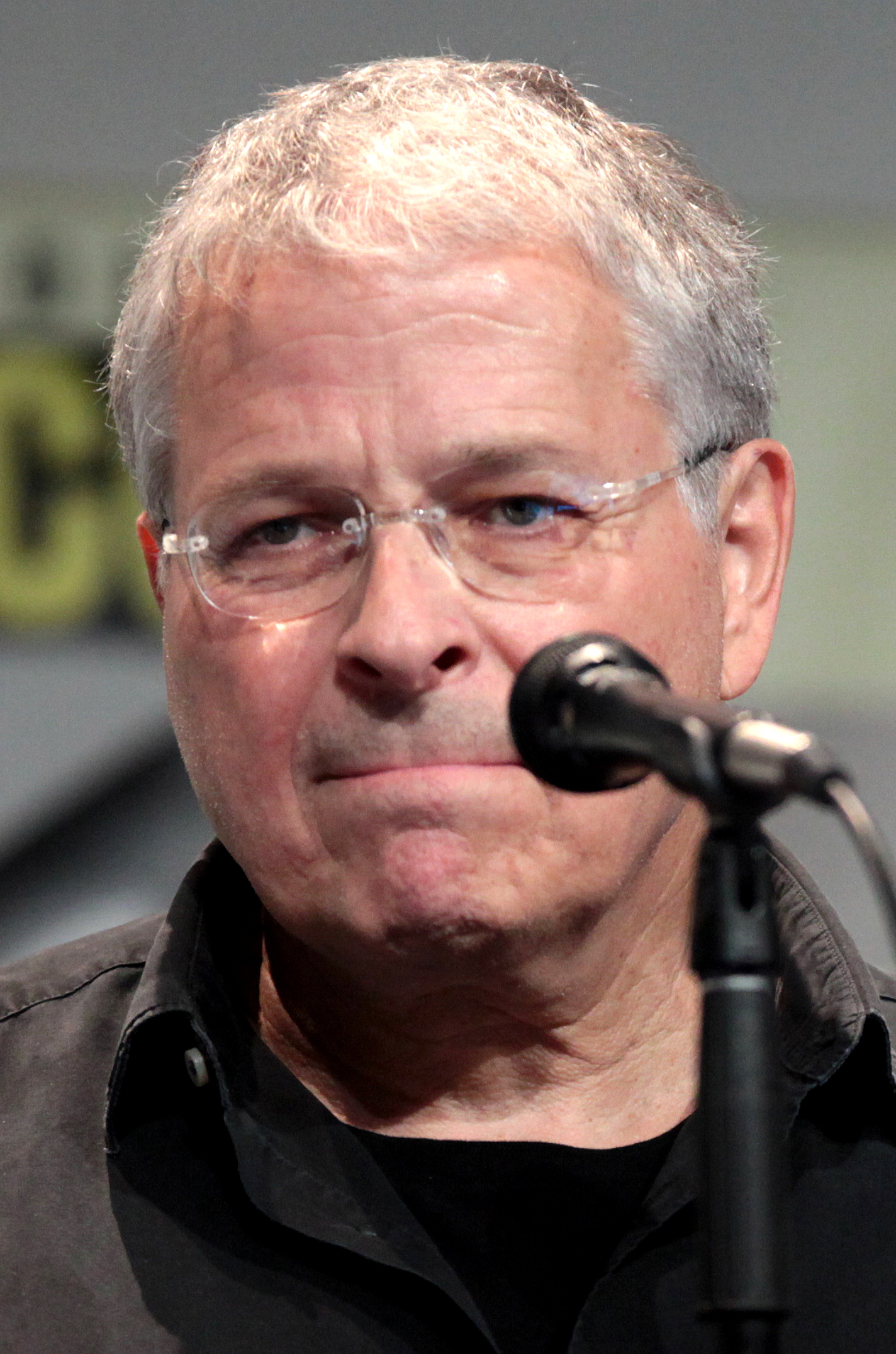
Lawrence Kasdan was the writer of The Bodyguard.

Lawrence Kasdan was an advertising copywriter for the W. B. Doner agency in Detroit who wanted to get into filmmaking. By 1975, Kasdan had spent five years in the agency, later calling it "hellacious"; in the middle of his tenure in the agency, he began writing film scripts.

Kasdan wrote eight scripts between 1970 and 1975. His sixth finished script, The Bodyguard, based on a singer who falls in love with a bodyguard, was completed by 1975. Kasdan later said that he was inspired by the 1961 film, Yojimbo, to write the script and envisioned American actor Steve McQueen and American singer-actress Diana Ross as the characters of bodyguard Frank Farmer and singer Rachel Marron respectively for the film. "I was interested in what kind of a guy would do that kind of work: to be willing to lay down his life for a salary, for someone he may care nothing about―maybe even have negative feelings about," said Kasdan.

Kasdan said it was the first really good script he wrote:

I loved all my early scripts and I expected everybody else to love them. It wasn't until I wrote The Bodyguard and sensed it was different that I realized I was writing an increased level of density. A good script has levels of action going on, unexpected turns. Movies are an economical form. Your script must communicate in the tersest possible way an emotional feeling, imply it in a mosaic of tiny scenes. An unknown screenwriter selling a speculative script must deliver a delight. An established writer gets a lot of rope. The producer reads his script and says, 'I don't feel any delight but he must know what he's doing.' A lot of times he doesn't, and you have a lousy movie.

Of the scripts Kasdan had sent, it was The Bodyguard where he succeeded in getting an agent, but it would take the agent two years to sell the script — according to Kasdan, the script was passed 67 times before it was eventually sold in 1977 to Warner Bros. Pictures head John Calley for $20,000. Calley brought in John Boorman to direct. Kasdan admired Boorman and went to Ireland with the director where they did a treatment for a new movie. "He completely changed it, but I still loved him," said Kasdan.

=== Early casting choices ===
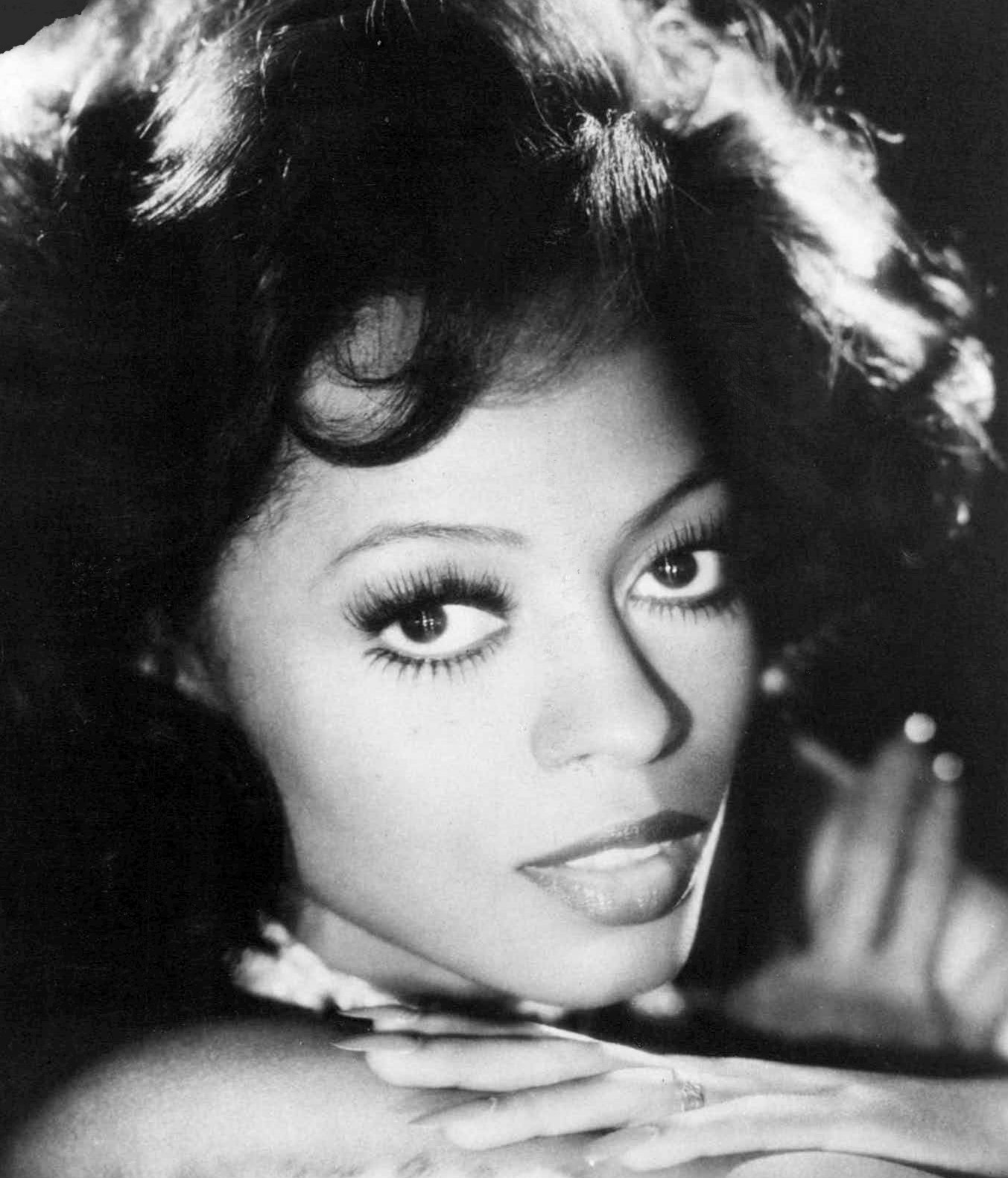
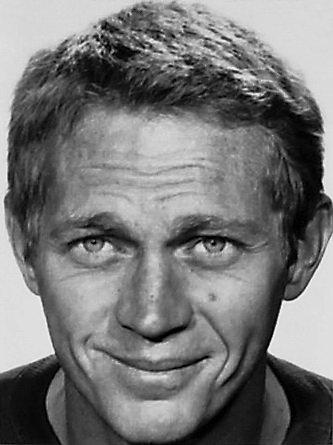
Diana Ross and Steve McQueen were the first stars picked for the film in its 1970s development but McQueen was too ill to accept while Ross later pulled out due to disagreements with the script.

When Kasdan initially wrote The Bodyguard, he had Steve McQueen and Diana Ross in mind as the stars of the film; following Warner Bros' purchase of the script, both actors were pursued. According to various reports, Ross would not accept the film unless she was given top billing over the more seasoned McQueen while the latter actor was interested initially but was starting to be beset by health issues that started to surface after developing a persistent cough in early 1978. According to some reports, McQueen eventually dropped out of negotiations due to the producers waiting too long to come to a deal and also due to his ongoing health issues, which worsened over time.

McQueen wouldn't lead in a box-office film again. He was later diagnosed with pleural mesothelioma, a rare and aggressive form of cancer linked to asbestos exposure, in December 1979 and which doctors concluded was inoperable. McQueen died from complications of that cancer roughly a year later in November 1980. By November 1978, Calley, Boorman and Kasdan had decided on American actor Ryan O'Neal to play the role of Frank after McQueen pulled out of negotiations while Ross stayed on as the leading female role. O'Neal had expressed interest in the role.

Around the same period, Ross and O'Neal were engaged in a romantic relationship, Ross' first since she divorced her first husband, Robert Ellis Silberstein. At the time, Ross was dealing with negative reviews and poor box office reception from her role in the critical and commercial bomb, The Wiz, from the previous month. Her two previous films, Lady Sings the Blues and Mahogany, had helped to establish her film career, with the former film winning her an nomination for the Academy Award for Best Actress.

Upon reading the script, Ross had a list of complaints to director Boorman. Chief among them were the usage of female nudity, the use of music, its violent subplot, coarse language, and the film's title. In August 1979, Ross pulled out of the movie which went back into development hell. Shortly afterwards, O'Neal announced that he and Ross had ended their romantic affair, which he blamed on Ross pulling out of The Bodyguard.

According to author J. Randy Taraborrelli, O'Neal said about Ross, "all of a sudden, she didn't want to play a woman guarded by a white bodyguard because Diana Ross doesn't wanna show her body, doesn't wanna do sex scenes on the screen, doesn't wanna sing and doesn't wanna be black... as you could see, we're no longer an item". O'Neal later stated that the reason the film was not produced was due to the Motown artist "playing off her reputation as a diva".

=== Development ===
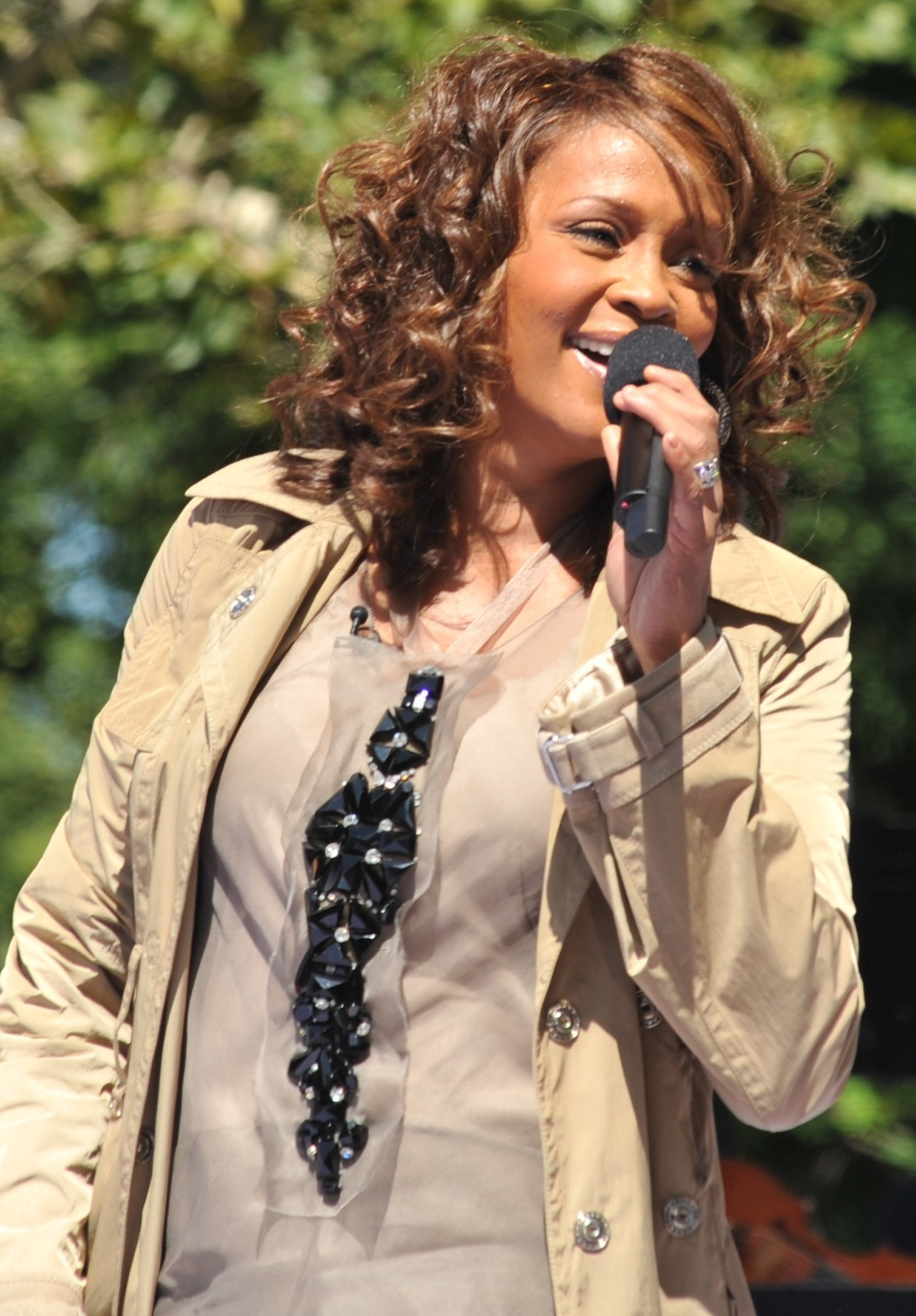
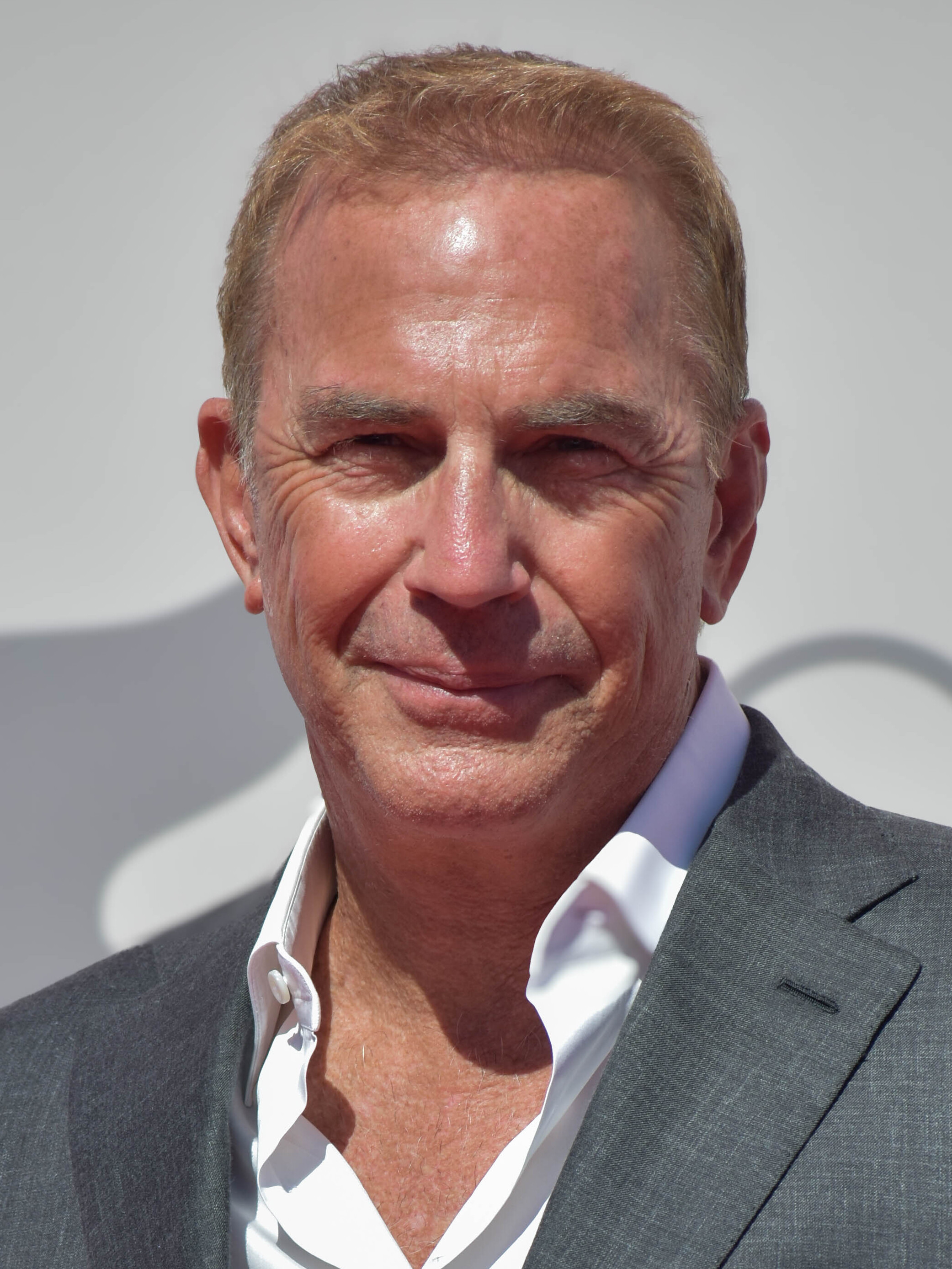
Whitney Houston was Kevin Costner's only choice to play Rachel Marron in The Bodyguard.

Whitney Houston's association with The Bodyguard dates to the mid-1980s when production was briefly explored again. According to the December 20, 1986 edition of Billboard magazine, "press reports indicate that Houston will make her film debut opposite Clint Eastwood in The Bodyguard." Though the Houston-Eastwood casting was press speculation, Houston was said to have remained the preferred choice for the leading role.

After Kasdan made his successful directorial debut with Body Heat, he was asked to direct The Bodyguard, but was reluctant, preferring to make The Big Chill, where he met aspiring actor Kevin Costner; the two became friends and when Kasdan prepared for the western film, Silverado, he hired Costner to be one of the stars on the film. It was while on break from shooting the film in 1985 that Costner read the script of The Bodyguard and became enthusiastic about it.

By then, Kasdan had rewritten the script of The Bodyguard so many times that he was burned out from doing anything else with it; he turned down Costner's request to direct, preferring to be the film's producer instead. Kasdan and Costner decided to produce it together. It was Costner's second film production after Dances with Wolves (1990) under his Tig Productions company.

The producers also agreed with casting Houston in the role of Rachel Marron as a new rewritten script started to be worked on in the late 1980s. Houston herself was not contacted until 1989 by Costner himself about taking the role. According to Houston in interviews, Costner told her he had decided to have Houston play Rachel after seeing one of her shows from her Moment of Truth World Tour in 1987, while it was suggested by music video director Peter Israelson that Costner had noted the video of her 1988 hit, "Where Do Broken Hearts Go" convinced the actor of Houston's acting abilities after viewing the video's 1940s-themed train station scene at Newark Penn Station featuring Houston. Houston remarked in later interviews, "I got word that he wanted me to do this film and that he didn’t want anyone else to do it besides me. That intrigued me. [I thought to myself] ‘Why can’t anybody else do this film?’"

According to Houston, who had only taken brief acting cameo roles in television sitcoms such as Gimme a Break! and Silver Spoons, she had wanted to take on smaller roles and moved her way up. Houston had been sought after for film roles by filmmakers such as Robert De Niro, Spike Lee and Quincy Jones but had politely turned down the offers due to her feeling she wasn't ready yet. American filmmaker Robert Townsend reportedly tried to get Houston to accept the role of Baby Doll in the musical drama The Five Heartbeats, only for Houston's film agent, Nicole David, to tell Townsend that the role was "too small" for her.

Houston was allowed by the producers to read the script of The Bodyguard. Upon reading, however, the singer was still reluctant to accept due to fears she would not be able to deliver in such a big role. Only after Costner assured her he would help her during the film's making would she finally accept. By the time Houston accepted the role in late 1990, Costner's popularity had increased with the successes of The Untouchables and Dances with Wolves, among others, which made making The Bodyguard easier to pursue.

Houston later mentioned that a friend reminded her, in taking on the role, what it would do for black women in the entertainment business, telling her "'Whitney, if you do this, do you realize what it would mean for other black actresses, for other black women, period?' Immediately I was encouraged. She was right. It's a very, very strong role for a black woman." In the years since Ross had dropped out of the film, black female leading roles were minimal, with only Whoopi Goldberg reaching that status with some success.

Despite Houston accepting the role, Warner Bros executives were reportedly unsure of Houston being in the film for multiple reasons, including Houston being two years removed from her last hit album, I'm Your Baby Tonight, with executives feeling Houston was "declining in terms of popularity". Houston's race was also an issue as executives feared a racial backlash due to her and Costner's characters engaging in a romantic affair. According to Costner, some executives had secondary picks such as Michelle Pfeiffer and Kim Basinger but he resisted those choices, stressing that the role of Marron had to go to an actual singer.

Costner stated later that Houston was his only choice to play Rachel Marron. Costner later explained his decision-making in keeping Houston:

"I just think that people are trying to cast [who] they think is the best person, and sometimes the feeling was, 'Well, let’s cast a real actress, that could be the best for the movie'. It’s like faking being a good baseball player. When you see one of our world-class actresses faking being a great singer, it doesn’t seem right. So I really felt that we should go for a true singer. It didn’t matter if she was Black or white. The fact that she was Black, that didn’t matter to me."

Executives then demanded that Houston do a screen test with Costner, which occurred in January 1991. Houston's screen test turned out to be successful and she was finally approved for the role. British director Mick Jackson was assigned as the director of the film, following his work on L.A. Story.

Upon accepting, Houston had her own demands, including eliminating implied sexual scenes, and requesting that her and Costner's characters engage in passionate lip locks rather than kissing in the mouth, requests that were granted. Nudity, which was one of the reasons Ross pulled out of the film, was already removed from Kasdan and Costner's new script and was only implied in a couple of scenes in the film. Though Houston felt she needed to learn how to act through the script, Costner told her to "act naturally and be herself".

Mick Jackson later said of Houston accepting the role in comparison to her pop star career: "You're making a queen of her genre into a beginner again, and Whitney was aware of the loss of control that would mean... Her life as a pop star means that everything is set to her requirements, which is totally different from what happens when shooting a film." In April 1991, Costner and Houston announced to the press that they were to film The Bodyguard later that year. Due to Houston doing the I'm Your Baby Tonight World Tour at the time, Costner and Kasdan set up filming for that November.

=== Filming and locations ===
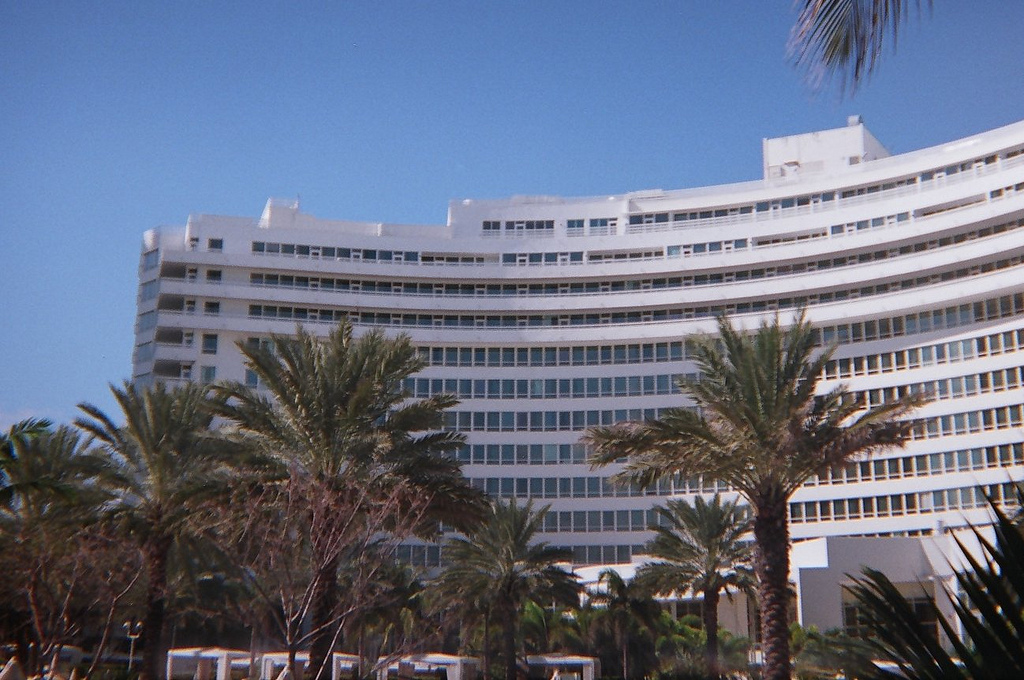
The main performance scenes in the film were shot at the Fontainebleau in Miami Beach.

Principal photography began at Los Angeles on November 25, 1991 and ended at Miami Beach, Florida on March 27, 1992, with other locations including Long Beach, Lake Tahoe and California's Fallen Leaf Lake. For the climactic Academy Awards sequence, the Academy of Motion Picture Arts and Sciences permitted the film to use the award name but not any of the trophies themselves.

On January 3, 1992, a fatal accident occurred on set in Downtown Los Angeles, when 33-year-old grip driver William Vitagliano was pinned between two cranes carrying lighting equipment and died from his injuries at a nearby hospital. Legal action was later brought against the manufacturers of the lifts, which resulted in an out-of-court settlement.

During the making of the film, Houston's Arista Records label boss and mentor Clive Davis had sent a letter to Costner, Kasdan and Jackson, worrying about Houston starring in a film that at the time featured minimal music based on a famous singer being stalked. Houston and Costner decided on making a deal with the film's distributor Warner Bros. Pictures to have Houston produce and sing songs for the film's soundtrack.

Houston's character eventually performed five songs in the film, including the film's central song "I Will Always Love You", which had been picked at the last minute after initial plans by Costner to bring the song "What Becomes of the Brokenhearted" were canceled after the song was used in the film Fried Green Tomatoes and was a hit for Paul Young.

The song, "Queen of the Night", was co-written by Houston and was used in the scene where Rachel performs at a dance club and is later besieged by her fans before being rescued by Frank. The "Queen of the Night" performance was shot at the Mayan Theater in Los Angeles. At the time she was working on the film and its accompanying soundtrack, Houston was reportedly six months pregnant with her then-fiance Bobby Brown's child. In January 1992, Houston miscarried the child but continued to film and record.

Houston later credited Brown with encouraging her to continue filming despite still dealing with self doubt over finishing the film. Costner also stayed close to Houston throughout the film through its March 1992 conclusion. Many of the film's stage performances, especially for "I Will Always Love You" and "I Have Nothing", took place at Miami's Fontainebleau hotel. The last day of shooting involved Houston performing a live rendition of "I Will Always Love You".

== Reception ==
=== Critical response ===
Upon release, The Bodyguard received mixed reviews. Review aggregator Rotten Tomatoes reports an approval rating of 40% based on 48 reviews. Its critical consensus reads: "The Bodyguard is a cheesy, melodramatic potboiler with occasional moments of electricity from Whitney Houston." On Metacritic the film has a score of 38 out of 100 based on reviews from 20 critics, indicating "generally unfavorable reviews". Audiences surveyed by CinemaScore gave the film a grade of "B+" on scale of A+ to F.

Costner and Houston’s performances were almost equally praised and criticized; some critics found Houston’s acting inadequate and Costner dull and wooden, while others commended her authenticity and his sex appeal. Owen Gleiberman of Entertainment Weekly wrote: "To say that Houston and Costner fail to strike sparks would be putting it mildly." He added that "the movie gives us these two self-contained celebrity icons working hard to look as if they want each other. It's like watching two statues attempting to mate." Roger Ebert gave it three out of four stars and wrote: "The movie does contain a love story, but it's the kind of guarded passion that grows between two people who spend a lot of time keeping their priorities straight."

The film is listed in Golden Raspberry Award founder John Wilson's The Official Razzie Movie Guide as one of The 100 Most Enjoyably Bad Movies Ever Made.

=== Box office ===
On November 23, 1992, a benefit premiere of the film took place at Hollywood's Mann's Chinese Theatre attended by its leading stars Houston and Costner. The film opened domestically in the United States and Canada two days later, on November 25 to 1,717 theaters.

In its opening weekend, the film grossed $16.6 million, ranking third. It spent ten weeks inside the top ten of the box office, eventually grossing $121.9 million in the North American box office, becoming the seventh highest-grossing film of 1992 in the United States and Canada. Internationally, the film was even more successful. In the United Kingdom, it had a record Christmas opening, with a gross of $2 million for the weekend from 258 screens. In Australia, it set an opening week record of $A4.36 million from 144 screens, beating the record set by Crocodile Dundee II. It also set the opening weekend record in Denmark. It was the highest-grossing Warner Bros. film in Japan of all-time with a gross in excess of $21 million. Eventually, the film's total global net gross was $410.9 million, which was a record for Warner Bros. As a result, it became the second-highest-grossing film of 1992, behind Aladdin, which opened on the same day. At the time of its release, it was the tenth-highest-grossing film of all time.

The film has since seen two re-releases, the first in 2012 occurred shortly after Houston's death, grossing a further $61,020, while a second more limited re-release happened in 2022 to commemorate the film's 30th anniversary since its release.

=== Accolades ===
Two songs from the film, "Run to You" and "I Have Nothing", were nominated for an Academy Award for Best Original Song at the 65th Academy Awards. The soundtrack was nominated for four Grammy Awards, winning three, including Album of the Year, which Houston won as both the main artist and producer, a first for a black woman, at the 36th Annual Grammy Awards. The film was nominated for several MTV Movie Awards, Image Awards, BMI Film & TV Awards, a Golden Screen Award in Germany and a Japan Academy Film Prize.

It received seven Golden Raspberry Award nominations, including Worst Picture, Worst Actor (Costner), Worst Actress (Houston), Worst Screenplay (Kasdan) and Worst Original Song ("Queen of the Night") at the 13th Golden Raspberry Awards. Houston was also nominated for Worst New Star as was Kevin Costner's haircut, however the film did not win in any category.

In 2004, the American Film Institute ranked the film's version of "I Will Always Love You" at number 65 on its AFI's 100 Years...100 Songs list. In 2018, the single version of "I Will Always Love You" was inducted into the Grammy Hall of Fame, followed by inclusion in the 2019 class of the National Recording Registry by the Library of Congress in 2020.

=== Home media ===
The Bodyguard was released on VHS and LaserDisc throughout North America on Warner Home Video on July 21, 1993 and was later reissued on VHS on February 1, 2000. The original release proved very successful in the video rental market, and ended up as the tenth top rental of 1993 in the United States. The DVD of the film was released on March 25, 1997 and as a special edition on February 1, 2005. Following Houston's death, the film was issued on Blu-ray on March 27, 2012. In the UK, the film was issued on VHS on June 28, 1993 and again on November 29, 1993 and August 1, 1994.

== Music ==
=== Soundtrack ===
The Bodyguard: Original Soundtrack Album, released by Houston on her label Arista Records, became the best-selling soundtrack of all time and the best-selling album by a female artist of all time. It has been certified diamond in the United States (sales of at least ten million) with shipments of over 19 million copies. Worldwide, the sales are over 45 million copies. In addition, Houston's rendition of Dolly Parton's "I Will Always Love You" sold over 24 million units worldwide, becoming the best-selling single by a female artist of all time.

The soundtrack features six songs which were hit singles for Houston: "I Will Always Love You", "I'm Every Woman" (a cover of the Chaka Khan song), the two Oscar-nominated songs, "I Have Nothing" and "Run to You", "Queen of the Night" and "Jesus Loves Me".

Other artists who appear on the soundtrack include fellow Arista recording artists Kenny G ("Even if My Heart Would Break", a duet with Aaron Neville), Lisa Stansfield ("Someday I'm Coming Back") and Curtis Stigers ("What's so Funny 'Bout Peace, Love and Understanding"). Also included is a hip-hop dance fusion song, "It's Gonna Be a Lovely Day", co-written and co-sung by singer and future RuPaul's Drag Race judge Michelle Visage. Both Visage and Nick Lowe, writer of "What's so Funny 'Bout Peace, Love and Understanding", credited Houston, who was the album's executive producer, for helping them financially by including their recordings on the album.

=== Score ===
John Barry was initially brought on to score the film, but withdrew and was replaced by Alan Silvestri. In 2013, La-La Land Records released a limited-edition CD (3,500 units) of Silvestri's score.

== Legacy and impact ==
=== Cultural and social impact ===
Despite its initial mixed response, the film has now been regarded as both a "romantic classic" as well as a classic 1990s film. In 2024, Variety included the film in their list of "50 Greatest Romantic Movies of All Time". Houston's performance of "I Will Always Love You" at the end of the film has been regarded as a "memorable musical moment" in box-office films. CinemaBlend included the film in its list of "21 Great Movies That Got Bad Reviews". Marie Claire ranked the film as one of the "75 Best '90s Movies That Are Modern Classics". Glamour magazine included it in their list of "62 Unforgettable '90s Movies for the Perfect Cosy Night In".

Houston's performance earned posthumous praise, with Billboard ranking her role in the film the 27th best out of 100 acting performances by a musician in a film, while /Film ranked her performance in the film as one of the "15 Best Acting Performances by Musicians in Movies". Vulture ranked Houston's film debut in The Bodyguard as the third best out of 17 film debuts by pop stars, topped only by Tina Turner's memorable cameo appearance in Tommy and Diana Ross' role as Billie Holiday in Lady Sings the Blues. The website Yardbarker also included her in their own list of "The Fifteen Best Acting Performances by Musicians". Collider placed her on their list of "Best Movies Starring Pop Stars" list.

The film and its accompanying soundtrack also helped to send Houston's career into the global stratosphere. Gail Mitchell, Billboard senior correspondent, stated, "plain and simple, The Bodyguard's unparalleled success cemented Whitney Houston's status in the firmament of iconic female singers," adding that the film sparked Houston's "second career as an actress — a transition that only a few singers have seamlessly accomplished."

The website Consequence further stated that Houston's success in The Bodyguard broke down barriers in Hollywood, "particularly for black actresses and producers", adding "just as her success as an R&B and pop star had secured more airtime for black artists, especially women, on MTV, Houston’s success with The Bodyguard would also pave the way for others to follow in the film industry." The film was notable for its successful portrayal of an interracial couple, with some journalists in various news organizations, such as ABC News, comparing it to the racial tensions that had occurred following the 1992 Los Angeles riots the previous April. Back in 1993, in the film's initial run, Entertainment Weekly credited Houston's mainstream appeal that allowed audiences to look past the interracial nature of her character's relationship with Costner's character.

Nineteen years later, in 2012, shortly after Houston's death, Jess Cagle of the same magazine explained to ABC News, "It was interesting that The Bodyguard also came out the year of the Rodney King riots, when tension between the races was very much in the news and very much a concern of everyone... then there was The Bodyguard, it was an interracial romance. There was no discussion about it. It was a monster hit. People loved it. People loved those two stars. For anyone to say that there was a problem with the interracial romance made you look stupid. It made you look completely out of step with the rest of the culture."

ABC News further explained in 2012, "At the time, a black woman and a white man sharing such a tender moment together on the big screen sparked widespread discussion about interracial issues." The film was compared to films such as Guess Who's Coming to Dinner and Jungle Fever, which came out a year prior, and said while films such as ...Dinner "made interracial love their pivotal plot points", The Bodyguard "seemed to blur race".

Canadian magazine Maclean's added that Houston's work on The Bodyguard "continued her streak of breaking down the racial lines in pop culture. Interracial romance in movies was usually avoided altogether or portrayed as a huge issue," whereas on The Bodyguard, that issue was secondary, adding "[Frank and Rachel's] romance was troubled not because of racial differences, but class differences."

=== Parodies and usage in culture ===
The film has been parodied numerous times in TV shows and films since its release. On The Simpsons tenth season episode "Mayored to the Mob", Homer Simpson (Dan Castellaneta) receives bodyguard training from an instructor Leavelle, voiced by Mark Hamill, who sings "I Will Always Love You" after the class graduates. Also in the episode, Hamill himself gets carried by Homer in a fashion which parodies the way Costner carries Houston in the film. On the first season 30 Rock episode "Hard Ball", Tracy Jordan (Tracy Morgan) is rescued from a mob by his entourage; his character sang "I Will Always Love You" during the scene.

In the 1996 film, Bulletproof, a scene in the film parodies The Bodyguard with Archie Moses (Adam Sandler) singing "I Will Always Love You" and remarking that Jack Carter (Damon Wayans) can always be his bodyguard. In The Venture Bros. episode, "I Know Why the Caged Bird Kills", after having fallen in love with her charge, Dr. Rusty Venture (James Urbaniak), bodyguard Myra Brandish (Joanna Adler) says she was taught "Never let them out of your sight. Never let your guard down. Never fall in love", the tag line from the film.

In the sketch comedy show, In Living Color, Kim Wayans plays Grace Jones as Rachael Marron, and Jim Carrey plays Frank Farmer, complete with bad hair. The scene when Frank carries Rachel off-stage from the original movie is reversed with Jones carrying Frank off while singing "I Will Always Love You". The teaser trailer for The Hitman's Bodyguard featured "I Will Always Love You" and also a spoof of the original movie poster. In the 12th season Family Guy episode "Boopa-dee Bappa-dee", Chris Griffin (Seth Green) thinks that the American national anthem is "I Will Always Love You" and sings it in front of an official to get back American citizenship.

=== Canceled sequel and attempted remakes ===
Following the success of the film, Costner contacted his longtime friend, Diana, Princess of Wales, to star in a sequel. She agreed and the first draft of the screenplay was completed the day before she died in 1997. Following her death, the film was scrapped.

In September 2021, it was reported that Matthew Lopez would be writing a remake of the film. In April 2025, development started anew with Sam Wrench to direct and Jonathan Abrams to write.

=== Musical ===
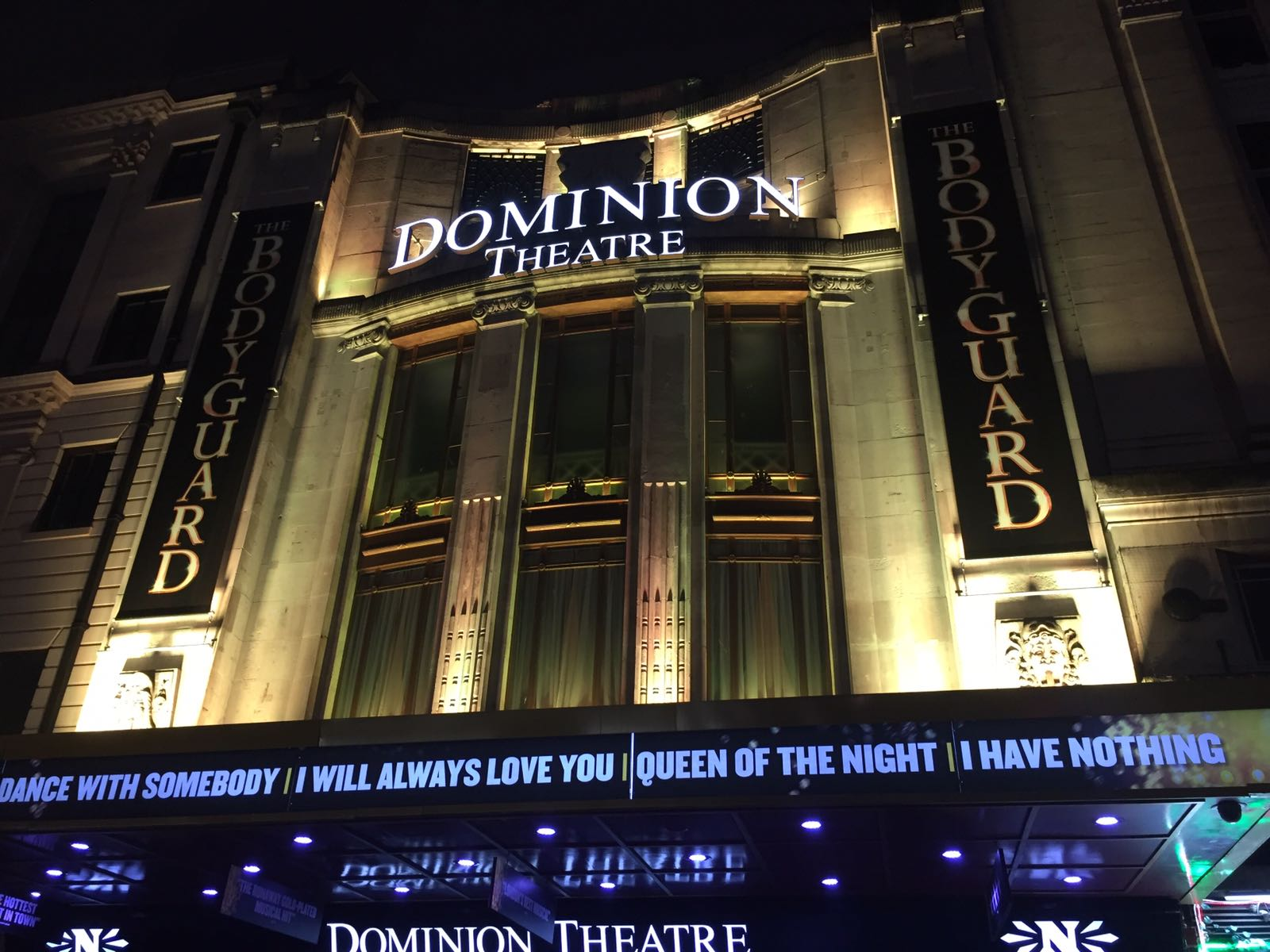
The Bodyguard at the Dominion Theatre during its West End revival.

The musical adaptation of the film, written by Alexander Dinelaris, produced by David Ian and directed by Thea Sharrock, opened at the Adelphi Theatre in London's West End on December 5, 2012, after previews at the same theater on November 6 and closed on August 29, 2014. Prior to producing the musical, Ian won stage rights from Kevin Costner and Lawrence Kasdan to produce it. The musical featured songs by Houston, both from the actual film and also from her own extensive catalog.

The show was officially confirmed in February 2012, a few days after Houston's death, following six years of development.

The production which initially was booking until April 2013, opening cast included Grammy and Tony Award winner Heather Headley as Rachel Marron, Lloyd Owen as Frank Farmer and Debbie Kurup as Nicki Marron. Ray Shell created the role of Bill Devaney, Rachel Marron's manager. A month after opening, booking was extended until 28 September 2013. Headley departed the show at the start of August with her alternate Gloria Onitiri taking over the role short term until September 7.

From September 9, the show's first major cast change took place with soul artist Beverley Knight taking over the role of Rachel Marron and Tristan Gemmill as Frank Farmer. The show initially extended to March after Knight took over but later extended booking to 30 August 2014. In March 2014, producers announced that The X Factor series 5 winner Alexandra Burke would take over from Knight on June 2. A typical London performance runs two hours and 25 minutes, including one interval of 20 mins.

A 2015-2016 national tour of the United Kingdom, Ireland and Monaco commenced at the Mayflower Theatre, Southampton in February 2015. Producers created a new set for the touring production and added a new Whitney Houston song, "Million Dollar Bill". The musical also performed at the Utrecht Beatrix Theater in Utrecht, Netherlands on September 12, 2015, followed by the Musical Dome in Cologne, Germany in November 2015. Both theaters carried the musical through 2017.

Following completion of the first UK tour, the production was scheduled to transfer to the West End's Dominion Theatre which had been running the Queen jukebox musical We Will Rock You, from 15 July 2016, booking for a limited run until 7 January 2017. Beverley Knight reprised her role as Rachel Marron and was joined by Ben Richards as Frank Farmer.

On May 15, 2015, producers announced that the show would make its North American debut in the fall of 2016 at Paper Mill Playhouse in Millburn, New Jersey for previews. The national US tour would launch from the Orpheum Theatre in Minneapolis and would star Grammy-nominated singer Deborah Cox as Rachel Marron and Judson Mills as Frank Farmer.

Since then, further iterations of the musical have opened in Seoul, Toronto, Australia, China, Madrid, Vienna, Barcelona and is currently touring the UK, Ireland and all over Europe. (Note: Attributed to multiple sources:)

== Bibliography ==
- Parish, James Robert (2003). Whitney Houston: The Unauthorized Biography. Aurum Press. ISBN 1-85410-921-9.
- Taraborrelli, J. Randy (1989). Call Her Miss Ross: The Unauthorized Biography of Diana Ross. Ballantine Books. ISBN 978-0-34536-925-3.
