= Susan Isaacs =

American novelist (born 1943)

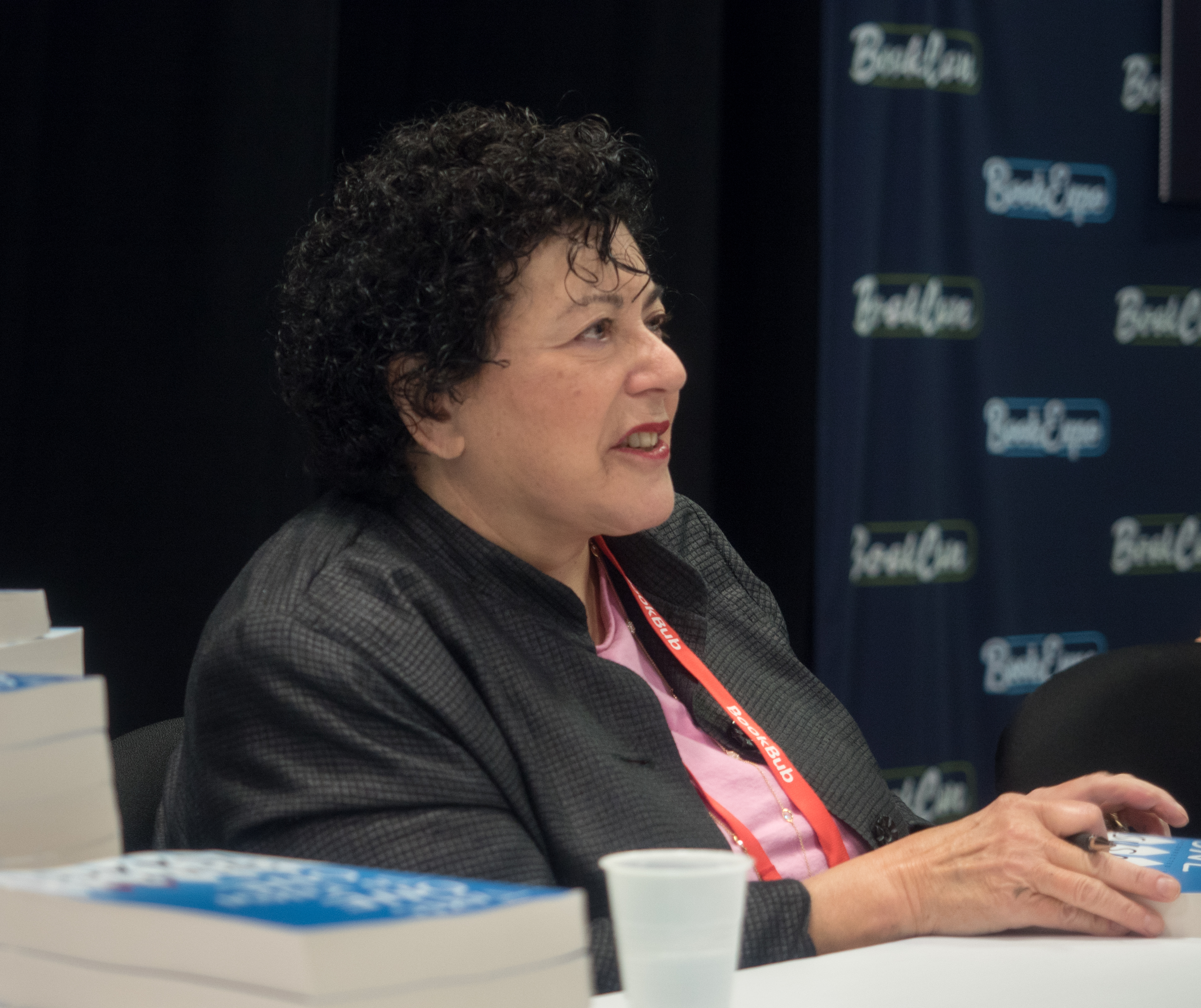
- Isaacs at BookExpo 2019
- Born: December 7, 1943 (age 82); New York City, U.S.
- Education: Queens College, City University of New York
- Occupations: Novelist; essayist; screenwriter
- Spouse: Elkan Abramowitz (m. 1968)
- Writing career
- Notable works: Compromising Positions; Red, White, and Blue; Lily White
- Website: susanisaacs.com

Susan Isaacs (born December 7, 1943) is an American novelist, essayist, and screenwriter. She adapted her 1978 debut novel into the film Compromising Positions.

== Early life, family and education ==
Susan Isaacs was born in Brooklyn, New York, to Helen Asher Isaacs, a homemaker, and Morton Isaacs, an electrical engineer. At Queens College, City University of New York, she majored in English and minored in economics. After college, she worked as a senior editor at Seventeen magazine and also as a freelance political speechwriter. She is Jewish.

She married Elkan Abramowitz, a lawyer, in 1968. She left work in 1970 to stay at home with her newborn son. Three years later, in 1973, she gave birth to her daughter.

During this time Isaacs freelanced, writing both speeches and magazine articles. She now lives on Long Island with her husband.

== Career ==
Her first novel (and first attempt at fiction), Compromising Positions, was published in 1978. It was chosen as a main selection of the Book of the Month Club and was a New York Times bestseller. Her fiction has been translated into thirty different languages. She has also written a work of cultural criticism, Brave Dames and Wimpettes: What Women are Really Doing on Page and Screen, and a novella, A Hint of Strangeness.

In addition to writing books and screenplays, Isaacs has reviewed fiction and nonfiction for The New York Times, the Los Angeles Times, The Washington Post, and Newsday. She belongs to the National Book Critics Circle. Isaacs has written about politics, including a series of essays on the 2000 presidential campaign for Newsday. She has also authored op-eds and articles on feminism, film, and First Amendment issues.

In 1985, Isaacs adapted her own novel for the screenplay of the Paramount film Compromising Positions, which starred Susan Sarandon and Raul Julia. She wrote and co-produced Touchstone Pictures' Hello Again, a 1987 comedy starring Shelley Long, Gabriel Byrne, and Judith Ivey. Two more of her novels have been filmed. Shining Through, from 20th Century Fox, came out in 1992; it starred Michael Douglas and Melanie Griffith. After All These Years was produced for the Hallmark Channel in 2013 and starred Wendie Malick.

Isaacs is active in the literary community. She served for more than a decade as a chairman of the board of Poets & Writers, and was president of the Mystery Writers of America. She belongs to the Creative Coalition, PEN, the International Association of Crime Writers, the American Society of Journalists and Authors. She is trustee emerita of the Queens College Foundation and was on the board of the Jewish Theological Seminary. Isaacs has also worked for Long Island organizations, including the Walt Whitman Birthplace Association, the North Shore Child and Family Guidance Association, and the Nassau County Coalition Against Domestic Violence.

== Works ==
=== Novels ===
==== Judith Singer series ====
- Compromising Positions. Viking. 1978. ISBN 9780713911763.
- Long Time No See. HarperCollins. 2001. ISBN 9780007130351.
- Compliments of a Friend. Open Road Media. 2013. ISBN 9781480454972.

==== Standalone books ====
- Close Relations. HarperCollins. 1980. ISBN 9780061735318.
- Almost Paradise. HarperCollins. 1984. ISBN 9780061014659.
- Shining Through. HarperCollins. 1988. ISBN 9780061030154.
- Magic Hour. HarperCollins. 1991. ISBN 9780061099489.
- After All These Years. HarperCollins. 1993. ISBN 9780060563738.
- Lily White. HarperCollins. 1996. ISBN 9780061256233.
- Red, White and Blue. HarperCollins. 1999. ISBN 9780007652044.
- Any Place I Hang My Hat. Simon & Schuster. 2004. ISBN 9780743463133.
- Past Perfect. Simon & Schuster. 2007. ISBN 9781416572084.
- As Husbands Go. Scribner. 2010. ISBN 9781416573081.

==== Marianne Kent series ====
- Goldberg Variations. Simon & Schuster. 2012. ISBN 9781451605921.
- A Hint of Strangeness (2015)

==== Corie Geller series ====
- Takes One to Know One. Atlantic Monthly. 2019. ISBN 9780802147554.
- Bad Bad Seymour Brown. Atlantic Monthly. 2023. ISBN 9780802159069.

=== Non-fiction ===
- Brave Dames and Wimpettes: What Women are Really Doing on Page and Screen. Ballantine. 1999. ISBN 9780345422811.

== Filmography ==
- Compromising Positions (novel, screenplay) (1985)
- Hello Again (screenplay, co-producer, actor) (1987)
- Shining Through (novel) (1992)
- After All These Years (novel) (2013)
