= Shining Through =

1992 film by David Seltzer

- Theatrical release poster
- Directed by: David Seltzer
- Screenplay by: David Seltzer
- Based on: Shining Through by Susan Isaacs
- Produced by: Carol Baum; Sandy Gallin; Zvi Howard Rosenman; David Seltzer
- Starring: Michael Douglas; Melanie Griffith; Liam Neeson; Joely Richardson; John Gielgud
- Cinematography: Jan de Bont
- Edited by: Craig McKay
- Music by: Michael Kamen
- Distributed by: 20th Century Fox
- Release date: January 31, 1992 (USA)
- Running time: 132 minutes
- Countries: United Kingdom; United States
- Languages: English; German
- Budget: $30 million
- Box office: $43.8 million

Shining Through is a 1992 American World War II drama film written and directed by David Seltzer and based on the 1988 novel by Susan Isaacs. It stars Michael Douglas, Melanie Griffith, Liam Neeson, Joely Richardson and John Gielgud, and the original music score was composed by Michael Kamen. The film was released in the United States on January 31, 1992 to negative reviews from critics and disappointing box office. It went on to win three Golden Raspberry Awards, including Worst Picture.

== Plot ==
In 1992, Linda Voss is interviewed by a BBC documentary team about her experiences during World War II. Growing up in New York City as a woman of mixed Irish/German Jewish parentage, she dreamed of visiting family members in Berlin. In 1940, Linda is hired as a translator by Ed Leland, a humorless attorney whose strange behavior suggests he is a spy. They become lovers and after the attack on Pearl Harbor, Ed is commissioned as a colonel in the OSS. Linda accompanies him to Washington D.C., and works in the War Department when he is posted overseas. He reappears with an attractive female officer and they resume their affair. When Albert Eckert, an undercover agent, is murdered in Berlin, the OSS recruit Linda volunteers to replace him and bring back data on the V-1 flying bomb.

Elderly master spy Konrad Friedrichs hides her in his house in Berlin and introduces her to his niece, Margrete von Eberstein, a socialite working as an Allied agent. Linda assumes the identity of Lina Albrecht, a household cook for Horst Drescher, a social-climbing Nazi officer. Drescher fires her when her cooking ruins a dinner party, but one of Drescher's guests, Franze-Otto Dietrich, takes her on as a nanny to his two children. She knows Dietrich is working on the project but proves unable to find intelligence on the V1 in the house.

Ed glimpses Linda in a newsreel of Adolf Hitler in a parade in Berlin. When his agents identify Dietrich standing next to her, he heads to Germany to rescue her, assuming the identity of a high-ranking German officer unable to speak due to war injuries. When he locates Linda, she refuses to leave with him, revealing she has found the location of her Jewish cousins.

Accompanied by Dietrich's children, Linda arrives at her relatives' hiding place and learns they've been captured. An Allied air raid forces them to take cover and the frightened boy inadvertently reveals the existence of a hidden room in Dietrich's basement. Linda sneaks in later and photographs V-1 rocket blueprints, narrowly avoiding detection by Dietrich. He confesses he has fallen in love with her and invites her to the opera where Linda's cover is blown by Margrete's mother Olga Leiner. They return home and Linda sees the heartbroken Dietrich loading his gun. When she sees Margrete using a pay phone to contact her Gestapo superiors, Margrete shoots Linda and reveals she's a double agent. Linda kills Margrete after a struggle and escapes her apartment via a laundry chute.

Ed and Friedrichs find Linda badly wounded, and Ed and Linda travel by train to the Swiss-German border. The border guards aren't convinced of Ed's cover story and he shoots his way through to the border, carrying Linda. A German sniper shoots him twice but he gets himself and Linda across before collapsing.

In the present, Linda reveals that while she and Ed recovered from their injuries in a Swiss hospital, the microfilm of the secret German documents was retrieved from a hiding place inside her glove and the Allies successfully bombed the V1 installation. Ed then joins the interview, and they reveal they've been happily married ever since.

== Cast ==
- Michael Douglas as Ed Leland
- Melanie Griffith as Linda Voss
- Liam Neeson as General Franze-Otto Dietrich
- Joely Richardson as Margrete von Eberstein
- John Gielgud as Konrad Friedrichs a.k.a. Sunflower
- Francis Guinan as Andrew Berringer
- Anthony Walters as Dietrich's Son
- Victoria Shalet as Dietrich's Daughter
- Sheila Allen as Olga Leiner
- Stanley Beard as Mr. Voss
- Sylvia Syms as Mrs. Voss
- Ronald Nitschke as Horst Drescher
- Hansi Jochmann as Hedda Drescher
- Mathieu Carrière as Capt. Von Haefler
- William Hope as Major Kernohan
- Constanze Engelbrecht as Stafson Von Neest
- Ludwig Haas as Adolf Hitler
- Wolf Kahler as German Border Commandant

== Production ==
The film was first announced in the fall of 1988, just after the publication of the novel by Susan Isaacs. It was to be written and directed by David Seltzer, produced at Columbia Pictures and would likely star Debra Winger. By late 1989, just after the fall of the Berlin Wall, Seltzer and producer Rosenman were reported to be scouting potential locations in East Berlin, Warsaw, Kraków and Budapest, and Meg Ryan and Michelle Pfeiffer were reported to be top contenders for the lead role Linda Voss. The production moved soon after to Twentieth Century Fox and in February 1990, it was announced that Melanie Griffith had been cast. After permission was secured to shoot the film on location in East Germany, the majority of it was shot in Berlin and Potsdam starting in October 1990, just as Germany was being reunified. Studio work was done at the DEFA Studios, the state film studios of East Germany.

Because all of Berlin's great train stations were destroyed in World War II, the production traveled over 100 miles (160 km) to Leipzig at the end of October to shoot scenes in the Leipzig Hauptbahnhof terminus, built in 1915 and the largest in Europe. This was prior to the building's modernization by the Deutsche Bahn. The finale, set at a border crossing and involving a period train, was shot in Maria Elend, Carinthia, Austria, in November 1990.

The New York City and Washington scenes at the beginning of the film were shot in and around London and at nearby Pinewood Studios. Locations included the Old Royal Naval College in Greenwich, Hammersmith, and St Pancras Station, which doubled for Zurich Station for a brief sequence set in Switzerland.

== Release ==
The film was released in the United States on January 31, 1992. The film opened in third place earning $6.4 million. The film concluded its run with $21.6 million domestic and $43.8 million worldwide.

== Reception ==
The film was neither a commercial nor a critical success. At the 13th Golden Raspberry Awards, Shining Through won Worst Picture, with Melanie Griffith being voted Worst Actress (also for her performance in A Stranger Among Us) and David Seltzer winning Worst Director. It also received nominations for Michael Douglas as Worst Actor (also for Basic Instinct) and for Seltzer in the category of Worst Screenplay. The film holds a 41% rating on Rotten Tomatoes based on 17 reviews with an average rating of 4.80/10.

Roger Ebert wrote in the Chicago Sun-Times, "I know it's only a movie, and so perhaps I should be willing to suspend my disbelief, but Shining Through is such an insult to the intelligence that I wasn't able to do that. Here is a film in which scene after scene is so implausible that the movie kept pushing me outside and making me ask how the key scenes could possibly be taken seriously."

Janet Maslin wrote in The New York Times that the first three-quarters of Susan Isaacs's book "never made it to the screen," including Linda Voss's love affair and marriage to her New York law firm boss John Berringer. "David Seltzer's film version of Shining Through manages to lose also the humor of Susan Isaacs's savvy novel. Even stranger than that is the film's insistence on jettisoning the most enjoyable parts of the story."

The film is listed in Golden Raspberry Award founder John Wilson's book The Official Razzie Movie Guide as one of The 100 Most Enjoyably Bad Movies Ever Made.

Awards
Preceded by Hudson Hawk	Razzie Award for Worst Picture; 13th Golden Raspberry Awards	Succeeded by Indecent Proposal
Preceded by Nothing but Trouble	Stinker Award for Worst Picture; 1992 Stinkers Bad Movie Awards	Succeeded by Sliver
