= A Stranger Among Us =

1992 film by Sidney Lumet

- Theatrical release poster
- Directed by: Sidney Lumet
- Written by: Robert J. Avrech
- Produced by: Steve Golin; Howard Rosenman; Sigurjón Sighvatsson
- Starring: Melanie Griffith
- Cinematography: Andrzej Bartkowiak
- Edited by: Andrew Mondshein
- Music by: Jerry Bock
- Production companies: ISIS; Propaganda Films; Sandollar; Mansfield Pictures
- Distributed by: Buena Vista Pictures Distribution (United States and Canada) (Note: Distributed under the Hollywood Pictures banner.); PolyGram Filmed Entertainment (International)
- Release date: July 17, 1992
- Running time: 109 minutes
- Country: United States
- Language: English
- Budget: $18 million
- Box office: $12 million

A Stranger Among Us is a 1992 American crime drama film directed by Sidney Lumet and starring Melanie Griffith. It tells the story of undercover police officer Emily Eden's experiences in a Hasidic community. It was entered into the 1992 Cannes Film Festival. It is often cited as one of Lumet's two failures of the 1990s, the other being Guilty as Sin (1993). Despite the poor reviews suffered by both these films, Lumet received the 1993 D. W. Griffith Award from the 45th Directors Guild of America Awards. The film was also the first credited role for actor James Gandolfini. The shooting of the film was used as an example in Lumet's book Making Movies.

== Plot ==
Hardened New York City homicide detective Emily Eden, daughter of a divorced former cop, and her partner Nick attempt to arrest two drug dealers. However, Nick is stabbed by one of the dealers, whom Emily shoots, killing him as he tries to flee. As a result, her superior Lt. Oliver temporarily takes away her gun. After Nick is hospitalized and the dealers have been apprehended, Emily goes undercover to investigate the murder of a Hasidic diamond-cutter named Yaakov Klausman. She questions the family of the Hasidic rebbe, an elderly Holocaust survivor who is revered for his wisdom and compassion toward his fellow Jews. He says to her, "You and I have something in common: We are both intimately familiar with evil. It does something to your soul."

While living with the rebbe's family, Emily changes her appearance and takes a liking to his son, Ariel, a young man who works as a diamond-cutter but teaches in the yeshiva and is expected to follow his father as the next rebbe. In addition to keeping all 613 Mitzvot, he is waiting for his intended, or basherte, Shayna Singer, the daughter of a Paris rebbe whom he has not yet actually met. They are the subjects of an arranged marriage but he believes that she is his soul mate, chosen by God. He is also studying the Kabbalah, which is regarded as rather daring for a man under 40. Its discussion of sexual intimacy is restrained but specific, as well as a metaphor for the relationship between Man and God.

Emily finds out that the "inside man" in the murder plot is the rebbe's adopted daughter Mara, who had been living a disorderly life until Yaakov introduced her to the rebbe. Afterwards, she joined the community as a repentant baalat tshuva, "one who has returned," until a person from her past approached her and she let him into the Diamond Center to steal diamonds worth about $750,000 and kill Yaakov.

Shortly after, Emily saves the rebbe's daughter Leah from being scammed by brothers Anthony and Christopher Baldessari, who claim to be Yaakov's killers. Emily instructs her second partner Levine to call for backup and arrests the Baldessaris, but the Baldessaris manage to escape. In the ensuing chase, Levine is injured, while Emily fatally shoots the Baldessaris. Before succumbing to his wounds, Anthony admits to Emily that he and Christopher were not responsible for Yaakov's death.

Having solved the case and with Mara now an accessory to murder, Emily rejects Nick's proposal, secretly romances Ariel to overcome her personal problems and returns to the rebbe's home with him but finds that Mara has taken Leah hostage. After Emily attempts to negotiate, Mara knocks her out and Ariel kills Mara with Emily's revolver, avenging Yaakov. Ariel comments that sometimes an evil deed has a partially good result. Emily is hospitalized for an examination, while the rebbe and his family bid her farewell. Ariel and Shayna get married, in which a reformed Emily watches from a distance. Eventually, she returns to work and catches up with an also reformed Levine, who is on leave and invites her on a two-week trip to Aruba. However, she declines and awaits her bashert.

== Cast ==
- Melanie Griffith as Emily Eden, a hardened New York detective.
- Eric Thal as Ariel, Leah and Mara's brother and the rebbe's adopted son.
- John Pankow as Levine, Emily's second partner.
- Tracy Pollan as Mara, the fiancée of Yaakov and Ariel and Leah's sister.
- Lee Richardson as Rebbe, Mara, Ariel, and Leah's adopted father.
- Mia Sara as Leah, Ariel and Mara's sister and the rebbe's adopted daughter.
- Jamey Sheridan as Nick, Emily's first partner.
- David Margulies as Lt. Lou Oliver, the superior of Emily, Nick and Levine.
- Burtt Harris as Mr. Eden, Emily's father.
- James Gandolfini as Anthony Baldessari, a criminal and Christopher's younger brother.
- Chris Collins as Christopher Baldessari, another criminal and Anthony's older brother.
- Jake Weber as Yaakov Klausman, Mara's fiancé and Ariel's best friend.
- Rena Sofer as Shayna Singer, Ariel's basherte.
- Ira Rubin as Rebbe Singer, Shayna's father.

== Production ==
Some aspects of the plot recall the 1977 murder of diamond dealer Pinchos Jaroslawicz. Scenes from the movie were filmed in Ridgewood, Queens. The shootout was filmed at the Eldridge Street Synagogue on the Lower East Side of Manhattan.

== Reception ==
A Stranger Among Us received negative reviews from critics.

On the review aggregator website Rotten Tomatoes, 22% of 41 critics' reviews are positive, with an average rating of 4.7/10. The website's consensus reads: "A disappointing misfire for director Sidney Lumet, A Stranger Among Us tries to tell a murder mystery and a fish-out-of-water love story, doing a disservice to both."

Film critic Roger Ebert described it as "a half-witted crime movie, wrapped in [a] love story that's a non-starter," and noted that "if there has ever been a crime, in all the history of crime movies, that has a lamer solution than this one, I cannot remember it," and "what's impossible to understand is how professional filmmakers could convince themselves that audiences would find the simple-minded crime plot even slightly plausible." He also wrote that "Jerry Bock's music is so inappropriately comical it seems to call for cartoon characters." Peter Travers' review of the film for Rolling Stone reported that director "Sidney Lumet hits the shoals in this cop-out-of-water story," that "casting the babyvoiced Griffith as a hard case is a major miscalculation," and described writer Robert J. Avrech’s script as "romance-novel mawkishness [with a] whodunit angle [that] is similarly lame." A review of the film by Desson Howe in The Washington Post noted that Melanie Griffith's voice "isn't the bark of a no-nonsense, take-charge woman. It's the squeak of a laryngitic munchkin," that her "inspiration-free performance attests merely to an ability to memorize a script," and that she is "sensationally miscast in this role. Nothing she says is believable."

Some of the criticism of A Stranger Among Us is based on comparisons with the Academy Award-winning film Witness, which has a superficially similar plot. Similarly, Lumet's earlier film Fail-Safe was unfavorably compared to Dr. Strangelove, but in that case both films have subsequently achieved cult status. Griffith's performance in the lead role has also been heavily criticized, for which her role won her the Golden Raspberry Award for Worst Actress (also for the year's Worst Picture, Shining Through), while Tracy Pollan was nominated for Worst Supporting Actress at the 13th Golden Raspberry Awards.
