= Stop! Or My Mom Will Shoot =

1992 American film by Roger Spottiswoode

- Theatrical release poster
- Directed by: Roger Spottiswoode
- Written by: Blake Snyder; William Osborne; William Davies
- Produced by: Ivan Reitman; Joe Medjuck; Michael C. Gross
- Starring: Sylvester Stallone; Estelle Getty; JoBeth Williams; Roger Rees
- Cinematography: Frank Tidy
- Edited by: Mark Conte; Lois Freeman-Fox
- Music by: Alan Silvestri
- Production company: Northern Lights Entertainment
- Distributed by: Universal Pictures
- Release date: February 21, 1992 (United States)
- Running time: 87 minutes
- Country: United States
- Language: English
- Box office: $70.6 million

Stop! Or My Mom Will Shoot is a 1992 American buddy-cop action-comedy film directed by Roger Spottiswoode and starring Sylvester Stallone and Estelle Getty. The film was released by Universal Pictures in the United States on February 21, 1992. The film received highly negative reviews upon release but grossed $70.6 million worldwide.

The film is generally considered a lesser film in Stallone's catalog. In 2006, in response to a question about the films Stallone regretted starring in, this film was the first one he mentioned.

== Plot ==
After a successful sting-operation-turned-shootout, Los Angeles Police Department Sergeant Joe Bomowski tries to call his elderly mother, Tutti, at home in Newark, New Jersey. He is dating his superior, Lieutenant Gwen Harper, who accuses him of calling another woman and ends their relationship. His mother arrives in Los Angeles for a visit and Joe is mortified by the well-meaning but overbearing Tutti, who embarrasses him even while talking a suicidal man off a ledge.

Disapproving of Joe's bachelor life, Tutti tidies up his apartment and ruins his sidearm with bleach. She visits a gun store to buy a replacement only to learn there is a mandatory "cooling off" period, and another customer, Mitchell, and his brother sell her an illegal MAC-10 machine pistol instead. Shady businessman J. Parnell has sent his henchmen, Paulie and Munroe, to recover guns stolen by Mitchell, who drives off after they open fire and kill his brother.

As the only witness to the murder, Tutti withholds information from Joe's rival Ross, determined to help her son solve the case himself and repair his relationship with Gwen. Joe has a nightmare about being babied by his mother, who presents him with the MAC-10. Tutti commiserates with Gwen over Joe's inability to share his emotions, and gives her son a full description of Mitchell and his van. Interrogating Mitchell's girlfriend at his apartment, the henchmen flee when Joe arrives with Tutti, who gives chase but crashes Joe's car.

Joe gives Ross his mother's information, but subjects him to a swirly when he disrespects her. The MAC-10 is traced to a shipment of weapons supposedly lost in a suspicious warehouse fire, which earned Parnell a $12 million insurance payout. Questioned by Joe and Tutti, Parnell orders his men to eliminate them. As Joe and his mother investigate the derelict warehouse, the henchmen attack them with a wrecking ball, and Munroe is shot at by Tutti and arrested by Joe.

Gwen kisses Joe for sending her a roomful of roses, but slaps him when he realizes that his mother was responsible, and he angrily confronts Tutti for interfering with his life. Preparing to sell the weapons in South America, Parnell has Paulie thrown out a window to his death. After his mother's advice allows him to reconcile with Gwen, Joe finds an apology letter from Tutti, who has left for the airport. He races to thank her, and she reluctantly agrees to abide by his rules for the rest of her stay.

Mitchell breaks into Joe's apartment and Tutti knocks him out with a frying pan, but he is seeking Joe's help, revealing that the guns he stole were from the "lost" shipment Parnell has hidden at an airstrip. Leaving Tutti and Mitchell handcuffed at his apartment, Joe arrives at the airstrip as Parnell loads the weapons onto a waiting plane. Tutti slips free and knocks Mitchell out again, taking his gun and van to the airstrip, where she is taken hostage. Stopping the plane with a truck, Joe is captured and Parnell prepares to kill him, but is shot in the shoulder by Tutti as the police arrive.

At the end of Tutti's visit, Joe and Gwen, now newly engaged, see her off at the airport. She recognizes a man from America's Most Wanted and Joe chases him down, as Tutti remembers he was on the run for shooting his own mother.

== Cast ==
- Sylvester Stallone as Sergeant Joseph Andrew "Joe" Bomowski
- Estelle Getty as Tutti Bomowski
- JoBeth Williams as Lieutenant Gwen Harper
- Roger Rees as J. Parnell
- Martin Ferrero as Paulie
- Gailard Sartain as Munroe
- Dennis Burkley as Mitchell
- J. Kenneth Campbell as Ross
- Al Fann as Sergeant Lou
- Ella Joyce as McCabe
- John Wesley as Sergeant Tony
- Nicholas Sadler as Suicide
- Ving Rhames as Mr. Stereo
- Christopher Collins as Gang Member
- Richard Schiff as Gun Clerk
- Vanessa Angel as Stewardess
- Marjean Holden as Stewardess
- Patti Yasutake as Newscaster
- Jophery Brown as Thug
- Manny Perry as Bad Guy
- Ernie Lively as Airport Man
- Julia Montgomery as Secretary

== Production ==
=== Casting ===
In a 2014 interview with Jimmy Fallon on The Tonight Show Starring Jimmy Fallon, Sylvester Stallone stated that Arnold Schwarzenegger, with whom he shared a public rivalry, tricked him into starring in the film. Schwarzenegger later admitted to this in a 2017 interview with Jimmy Kimmel on Jimmy Kimmel Live!, saying:

I read the script, and it was a piece of shit. Let's be honest. I say to myself, "I'm not going to do this movie..." Then they went to Sly, and Sly called me: "Have they ever talked to you about doing this movie?" And I said, "Yes, I was thinking about doing it. This is a really brilliant idea, this movie." When he heard that, because he was in competition, he said, "Whatever it takes, I'll do the movie." And of course the movie went major into the toilet.

== Reception ==
=== Box office ===
The film brought in $28.4 million in the US and over $42.2 million internationally for a total of $70.6 million worldwide.

=== Critical response ===
The film has a 17% approval rating on Rotten Tomatoes based on 30 reviews. The critical consensus reads: "Thoroughly witless and thuddingly unfunny, Stop! Or My Mom Will Shoot gives its mismatched stars very little to work with - and as a result, they really don't work." Audiences polled by CinemaScore gave the film an average grade of "B+" on an A+ to F scale.

Rita Kempley of The Washington Post called it "your worst nightmare" but stated that "the concept is actually better for Stallone than the premises of his earlier awful romps, Rhinestone and Oscar." Clifford Terry wrote in the Chicago Tribune that the film "plays like an extended sitcom-perhaps four episodes of She's the Sheriff" and also that "About two-thirds into Stop! Or My Mom Will Shoot, Sylvester Stallone actually delivers the title line. That's how numbingly awful this is. Give it half a star for being in focus." Michael Wilmington of the Los Angeles Times wrote that the film seemed like Stallone's response to Schwarzenegger's turn to comedies like Kindergarten Cop and added, "This is another 'high-concept' marketing hook job—a slick, slow-witted, shiny, 100% predictable movie—and the scriptwriters ... don't have anything richer on their minds than the usual feisty mother-son gags."

Both Gene Siskel and Roger Ebert disliked the film, and both gave it a thumbs down in their onscreen review. Siskel said "If this doesn't turn out to be one of the very worst movies of the year, it's gonna be a VERY bad year," while Ebert called it "one of the worst movies I've ever seen"; in his newspaper review (in which he awarded half of one star out of four), Ebert wrote while Stallone and Estelle Getty had both performed well in other comedic roles, Stop! Or My Mom Will Shoot was "one of those movies so dimwitted, so utterly lacking in even the smallest morsel of redeeming value, that you stare at the screen in stunned disbelief. It is moronic beyond comprehension, an exercise in desperation during which even Sylvester Stallone, a repository of self-confidence, seems to be disheartened." Siskel gave the film zero stars out of four and stated that if the script had been submitted to the staff of The Golden Girls, which co-starred Getty, it "would be summarily dismissed as too flimsy for a half-hour sitcom. There is not one laugh nor surprising moment to be found, starting with the scene where Stallone and Getty happen upon a jumper atop a building and Getty manages to bring the man down safely using a bullhorn."

=== Stallone's thoughts on the film ===
Sylvester Stallone has stated that Stop! Or My Mom Will Shoot was the worst film he had ever starred in. He told Ain't It Cool News that it was "maybe one of the worst films in the entire solar system, including alien productions we've never seen", that "a flatworm could write a better script", and that "in some countries – China, I believe – running [the movie] once a week on government television has lowered the birth rate to zero. If they ran it twice a week, I believe in twenty years China would be extinct."

Later Stallone said:

Stop! Or My Mom Will Shoot was supposed to be like Throw Momma from the Train with the mom as this really nasty piece of work. Instead, you hire the nicest woman in Hollywood, Estelle Getty, who you wish was your mother. That's the end of that! Also, I had heard Schwarzenegger was going to do that movie and I said, "I'm going to beat him to it." I think he set me up.

In 2006, in response to a question about the films Stallone wished he never starred in, he started with this one.

=== Accolades ===
The film was the recipient of three Golden Raspberry Awards, Stallone as Worst Actor, Getty as Worst Supporting Actress and Worst Screenplay, at the 13th Golden Raspberry Awards.

== In popular culture ==
The film was mentioned in a 1997 season 23 episode Saturday Night Live that Stallone hosted. In the sketch, Stallone comes across someone in a terrible car accident (Norm Macdonald) who does not like any of his work and ridicules his films. As he lies dying, he mutters something quietly that only Stallone can hear and when a passerby (Will Ferrell) asks what he said, Stallone is reluctant to say it until he is grilled some more, at which point he yells "He said Stop! Or My Mom Will Shoot...SUCKED!"

The title of The Simpsons season 18 episode "Stop, or My Dog Will Shoot!" is a reference to the film. That episode involves the Simpsons' dog Santa's Little Helper joining the Springfield Police Force after saving Homer Simpson (Dan Castellaneta) from a corn maze.

In Mortal Kombat 11, during a pre-match dialogue exchange between John Rambo (voiced by Stallone) and Cassie Cage (Erica Lindbeck), Cassie references the film's title.
