= Shining Through (novel) =

1988 novel by Susan Isaacs

- US first edition cover
- Author: Susan Isaacs
- Language: English
- Genre: Historical fiction
- Publisher: Harper & Row
- Publication date: July 1, 1988
- Publication place: United States
- Media type: Print
- Pages: 402
- ISBN: 978-0060159795

Shining Through is an American World War II novel by Susan Isaacs. It was published by HarperCollins in 1988. The book was made into a 1992 film of the same name, starring Michael Douglas as Edward Leland and Melanie Griffith as Linda Voss.

== Plot summary ==
In 1940, Linda Voss, 31 and unmarried, is secretary to John Berringer, a partner in a New York law firm. She is secretly in love with John, but he is married to Nan, the daughter of the senior partner Edward Leland, and politically and socially well-connected. She begins an affair with John after his wife leaves and sues for divorce. Linda becomes pregnant and they marry in a brief civil ceremony, which neither is really enthusiastic about. Leland moves to Washington to take a senior position in a new organisation, soon to be renamed the Office of Strategic Services (OSS), which coordinates war-related information from German refugees in America. He requests that John and Linda join him; because of Linda's fluent German, learnt from her Berlin-born grandmother, and her full FBI security clearance, Linda works directly with Ed. She is able to alert him that a translator is falsifying information from a number of informants. Ed travels a lot and Linda learns that he is going into Germany and German-occupied Poland. His main contact is "Sunflower", a rich German industrialist he has known since the 1920s and visits regularly in Germany and Switzerland. Sunflower also runs a number of agents. Linda has a miscarriage and loses the baby.

America enters the war. John is now in charge of counterespionage in Germany and France. At a meeting between the FBI and the OSS—a meeting charged with professional rivalry—Linda learns of Alfred Eckert, a dress designer popular with the wives of many high Nazi officials. He has been passing information since 1938, but is now dead, murdered by a person unknown. The circumstances are unclear and it is not known if his cover had been compromised, but he needs to be urgently replaced. Linda begins to imagine herself in his place. In Brooklyn, Linda’s mother—a long-time alcoholic—dies, and John accompanies her to the funeral. John is forced to return to work, but Linda stays on. Going through old papers clearly relating to her grandmother's time, she finds fragments of German-language newspapers, photographs of her grandmother’s Jewish cousins Hannah and Liesel Weiss, and a document in Hebrew. She takes some of the material home to Washington. Linda returns to find John and Nan in a passionate embrace. Nan confesses that she is dissatisfied with Quentin, her new husband, and John admits that he never stopped loving Nan. After angry and emotional scenes, Nan leaves to return to Quentin. Linda, although furious with John, allows him to stay.

Norman Weekes of the FBI calls a meeting at which he presents a short-list of potential agents to replace Eckert. Ed and John reject them all for various reasons. Linda finds herself saying, "Why not me?" Weekes is all for Linda’s suggestion, but Ed is furious. With John at the office at all hours and hardly ever home, Ed confronts Linda and angrily explains what a dangerous idea he thinks it is. He describes to her the latest information his office has received about the beginning of the mass-murder of all European Jews, and that if caught, Linda, with Jewish ancestry, could expect the same fate. She is not deterred and finally resigns. She goes to Weekes and volunteers her services. Linda is sent to OSS Assessment school, and then to Training school, where she gets a taste of what she can expect in Germany. She is given a cover identity and story, and then spends a few weeks with a German couple in Baltimore, fine-tuning her Berlinerisch accent.

Sent via troopship to England, she spends a few days studying maps and learning about a safe house to which she can escape, but only in the direst emergency. With the cover name of "Lina Albrecht", she is flown to Lisbon, where she is to be contacted by agent named "Rex". He turns out to be Konrad Friedrichs, a respected senior employee of the German Foreign Office. He is their ranking expert on Spain and Portugal, hence his frequent visits. He is also a covert anti-Nazi. They fly to Berlin where Lina is installed in the basement of his house. Her cover is that of a cook, hence her working-class accent, but Friedrichs is uneasy, concerned that her accent is not genuine enough to pass for a native. With the housekeeper, who believes that Lina is her employer's mistress, sent away on a holiday, Lina meets Margarete von Eberstein. Margarete is a translator with the Abwehr, a friend of Friedrichs and a covert Resistance member. She is from an aristocratic family, with a mother who is a retired actress and once a favorite of Adolf Hitler. Margarete also has a lover, a colonel on Hitler's staff, from whom she gleans information. Margarete starts to teach Lina to cook gourmet German style. Venturing out into Berlin to familiarise herself with her surroundings, Lina is caught in a random police check, but her documents and accent do not arouse any suspicion. She also makes contact with Rolf, a fishmonger and courier of information.

Lina is placed as a cook in the house of Horst and Hedwig Drescher, on the recommendation of Friedrichs. Drescher's cook has met with an "accident", and it is hoped that Lina can take up where Eckert left off, as it is known that Drescher, head of the British section of the Foreign Office, keeps confidential papers at home. Drescher, a social climber, regularly hosts dinner parties with high-ranking guests. The first meal is less than satisfactory, but Drescher seems not to notice, and Lina stays. Realizing that Hedwig is a chronic hypochondriac and rarely leaves the house, Lina learns to offer her milk and honey liberally laced with brandy. While Hedwig sleeps, Lina finds the hidden key to Horst's study and locates concealed documents. She makes copies, which she passes on via Rolf. Despite Margarete's pleas not to trust anyone—even her—Lina eventually passes a message to Rolf asking him to try to locate her cousins, who she hopes are still in Berlin. A few weeks later, Rolf tells her that the sisters cannot be found; they are certainly deported and probably dead.

As Spring 1944 approaches, Lina finds a document suggesting that the Germans have penetrated the plans for the D-Day landings and have placed a man in a key position. She knows she must get this intelligence back as soon as possible, but Horst phones from his office, asking Hedwig to get a document from his study. She cannot find the secret key, which Lina has hidden, and goes into hysterics. Lina realises that she has to get out, so taking only the clothes she is wearing, she flees and takes refuge with Margarete. She then goes to Rolf’s shop, but it is closed. Lina breaks into Friedrichs’s house and confronts him with the news that he is probably compromised and must leave Germany immediately any way he can. Then she spends the day on the streets, hiding in shop queues, before returning to Margarete’s flat. She reveals to Margarete her real identity and mission and that she has to get out. Under cover of fetching some food, Margarete pulls a gun on her, admitting that it was she who betrayed Eckert and that she has also denounced Rolf. She tells Lina, now revealed as Linda, that she has been a "mole" in the Resistance movement and that she must now kill Linda. They fight and Linda is wounded in the arm before she manages to shoot Margarete dead.

Faint from blood loss, Linda manages to apply an improvised bandage as she had been taught in training school, before falling unconscious. She awakes the next day to find herself being treated by Friedrichs, accompanied by Ed Leland in the uniform of a General of the SS. It transpires that Friedrichs flew to Lisbon, contacted Ed and they returned to Berlin. Ed has documents for Linda, not good ones but it is hoped they will do. His cover is of a General who is mute owing to a throat wound on the Russian front. He is taking Linda, travelling as his mistress, by train to Basel for a medical appointment. Friedrichs sees them onto the train, but refuses to leave his beloved Berlin. At the Swiss border, Ed is allowed through but Linda's fake papers cause some delay. Ed calmly bribes the German customs officer with twenty thousand dollars in Swiss francs. Linda recovers in a Swiss hospital, but as Ed is about to leave, she realizes that she loves him, that she always did and never loved John in the same way. Ed reveals that Nan has returned to Quentin and is about to make Ed a grandfather. Linda persuades Ed that he really loves her—despite him being twenty years older—and they agree to marry.

== Adaptation ==
Shining Through was adapted into a 1992 film of the same name, starring Melanie Griffith as Linda Voss and Michael Douglas as Edward Leland. Janet Maslin of The New York Times wrote that much of the novel's plot, including Linda's love affair and marriage to her New York law firm boss, were not included in the film.
