= 1240 AM =

AM radio frequency

The following radio stations broadcast on AM frequency 1240 kHz: 1240 AM is a regional (Class B) frequency outside the coterminous 48 United States (Alaska, Hawaii, Puerto Rico, & U.S. Virgin Islands), and a local frequency (Class C) within the coterminous 48 United States.

== Argentina ==
- Cadena Uno in Argentina
- LRI218 Universidad Nacional del Sur in Bahia Blanca, Buenos Aires

== Canada ==
| Call sign | City of license | Daytime power (kW) | Nighttime power (kW) | Transmitter coordinates |
|---|---|---|---|---|
| CBLE | Beardmore, Ontario | 0.04 | 0.04 | 49.5969°N 87.9594°W |
| CBLO | Mattawa, Ontario | 0.04 | 0.04 | 46.3136°N 78.7214°W |
| CFNI | Port Hardy, British Columbia | 10 | 9 | 50.7094°N 127.438°W |
| CJAR | The Pas, Manitoba | 1 | 1 | 53.812778°N 101.276389°W |
| CJOR | Osoyoos, British Columbia | 1 | 1 | 49.0825°N 119.524°W |
| CKIM | Baie Verte, Newfoundland and Labrador | 1 | 1 | 49.9569°N 56.1781°W |
| CKMK | Mackenzie, British Columbia | 1 | 1 | 55.3467°N 123.15°W |

== Mexico ==
- XEBQ-AM in Guaymas, Sonora
- XECG-AM in Nogales, Sonora
- XEMEFM-AM in Morelia, Michoacan
- XERD-AM in Pachuca, Hidalgo
- XEWG-AM in Cd.Juarez, Chihuahua

== United States ==
| Call sign | City of license | Facility ID | Class | Daytime power (kW) | Nighttime power (kW) | Unlimited power (kW) | Transmitter coordinates |
|---|---|---|---|---|---|---|---|
| KADS | Elk City, Oklahoma | 29030 | C | | | 1 | 35.380833°N 99.406944°W |
| KAMQ | Carlsbad, New Mexico | 33300 | C | 1 | 1 | | 32.395278°N 104.246667°W |
| KANE | New Iberia, Louisiana | 48452 | C | | | 1 | 30.0175°N 91.836111°W |
| KASL | Newcastle, Wyoming | 9288 | C | | | 1 | 43.846389°N 104.2125°W |
| KASO | Minden, Louisiana | 13803 | C | | | 1 | 32.630556°N 93.282222°W |
| KBEL | Idabel, Oklahoma | 14759 | C | | | 1 | 33.881667°N 94.819444°W |
| KBGV | Monte Vista, Colorado | 58903 | C | | | 1 | 37.602778°N 106.149444°W |
| KBIZ | Ottumwa, Iowa | 24207 | C | | | 1 | 41°N 92.389722°W |
| KBUP | Olympia, Washington | 34486 | C | 1 | 1 | | 47.057778°N 122.900833°W |
| KCCR | Pierre, South Dakota | 60858 | C | | | 1 | 44.350556°N 100.318889°W |
| KCLV | Clovis, New Mexico | 74565 | C | 1 | 1 | | 34.378056°N 103.206111°W |
| KCRT | Trinidad, Colorado | 52475 | C | | | 0.25 | 37.145833°N 104.511667°W |
| KCVL | Colville, Washington | 49195 | C | | | 1 | 48.520833°N 117.907778°W |
| KCVV | Sacramento, California | 29297 | C | 1 | 1 | | 38.588056°N 121.468056°W |
| KDEC | Decorah, Iowa | 16368 | C | | | 0.58 | 43.324444°N 91.784722°W |
| KDGO | Durango, Colorado | 55657 | C | | | 1 | 37.305°N 107.856944°W |
| KDLR | Devils Lake, North Dakota | 15272 | C | | | 1 | 48.111667°N 98.845278°W |
| KDOK | Kilgore, Texas | 48950 | C | | | 1 | 32.417222°N 94.854167°W |
| KDSK | Los Ranchos de Albuquerque, New Mexico | 59687 | C | | | 1 | 35.201667°N 106.598889°W |
| KEJO | Corvallis, Oregon | 39573 | C | 1 | 1 | | 44.593889°N 123.225°W |
| KELK | Elko, Nevada | 19371 | C | 1 | 1 | | 40.865556°N 115.719444°W |
| KEWE | Kahului, Hawaii | 161045 | B | 5 | 5 | | 20.8225°N 156.454167°W |
| KEZY | San Bernardino, California | 28663 | C | 0.7 | 0.7 | | 34.081944°N 117.304722°W |
| KFBC | Cheyenne, Wyoming | 43629 | C | | | 0.7 | 41.121389°N 104.839444°W |
| KFH | Wichita, Kansas | 53598 | C | | | 0.63 | 37.718333°N 97.318056°W |
| KFMO | Flat River, Missouri | 55100 | C | | | 1 | 37.852778°N 90.520278°W |
| KFOR | Lincoln, Nebraska | 34436 | C | 1 | 1 | | 40.819444°N 96.658611°W |
| KHNK | Whitefish, Montana | 160441 | C | 0.4 | 0.4 | | 48.395556°N 114.319722°W |
| KICD | Spencer, Iowa | 29078 | C | | | 1 | 43.165833°N 95.146111°W |
| KIUL | Garden City, Kansas | 67041 | C | | | 1 | 37.997778°N 100.906944°W |
| KJAA | Globe, Arizona | 24161 | C | | | 1 | 33.380833°N 110.756944°W |
| KJCR | Billings, Montana | 41600 | C | 1 | 1 | | 45.758056°N 108.497778°W |
| KJOP | Lemoore, California | 31589 | C | 0.25 | 1 | | 36.313056°N 119.73°W |
| KLIK | Jefferson City, Missouri | 68147 | C | | | 1 | 38.563889°N 92.189167°W |
| KLOA | Ridgecrest, California | 459 | C | | | 0.82 | 35.634444°N 117.670833°W |
| KLTZ | Glasgow, Montana | 24243 | C | 1 | 1 | | 48.218333°N 106.645278°W |
| KLYQ | Hamilton, Montana | 4699 | C | 1 | 1 | | 46.256111°N 114.1625°W |
| KMBY | Monterey, California | 35276 | C | 1 | 1 | | 36.615556°N 121.898333°W |
| KMHI | Mountain Home, Idaho | 72657 | C | 1 | 1 | | 43.150833°N 115.707222°W |
| KNEM | Nevada, Missouri | 35216 | C | | | 0.5 | 37.860278°N 94.381667°W |
| KNSN | San Diego, California | 30831 | C | 0.55 | 0.55 | | 32.694167°N 117.121389°W |
| KODY | North Platte, Nebraska | 9931 | C | | | 1 | 41.153889°N 100.773056°W |
| KOFE | St. Maries, Idaho | 65263 | C | 1 | 0.5 | | 47.320556°N 116.547222°W |
| KOKL | Okmulgee, Oklahoma | 55496 | C | | | 1 | 35.608611°N 95.971944°W |
| KPOD | Crescent City, California | 72537 | C | 1 | 1 | | 41.759722°N 124.191111°W |
| KQEN | Roseburg, Oregon | 40386 | C | | | 1 | 43.193056°N 123.360833°W |
| KRAL | Rawlins, Wyoming | 46736 | C | | | 1 | 41.781944°N 107.261111°W |
| KRDM | Redmond, Oregon | 129314 | C | 1 | 1 | | 44.278056°N 121.145556°W |
| KRDO | Colorado Springs, Colorado | 66250 | C | 1 | 1 | | 38.828611°N 104.838889°W |
| KRJW | Altamont, Oregon | 160745 | C | 1 | 1 | | 42.205°N 121.759722°W |
| KSMA | Santa Maria, California | 4123 | C | | | 1 | 34.950556°N 120.490833°W |
| KSOX | Raymondville, Texas | 18653 | C | 0.52 | 0.85 | | 26.405278°N 97.914444°W |
| KSUE | Susanville, California | 60302 | C | 1 | 1 | | 40.395833°N 120.6275°W |
| KTAM | Bryan, Texas | 62002 | C | 0.38 | 0.38 | | 30.650278°N 96.349167°W |
| KTIX | Pendleton, Oregon | 643 | C | 0.8 | 0.8 | | 45.685°N 118.854722°W |
| KTLO | Mountain Home, Arkansas | 35671 | C | 0.83 | 0.83 | | 36.356389°N 92.359167°W |
| KVLF | Alpine, Texas | 5216 | C | | | 1 | 30.373611°N 103.662222°W |
| KVRC | Arkadelphia, Arkansas | 24734 | C | | | 1 | 34.110833°N 93.050278°W |
| KVSO | Ardmore, Oklahoma | 11182 | C | | | 1 | 34.181667°N 97.146667°W |
| KWAK | Stuttgart, Arkansas | 2774 | C | 0.96 | 0.96 | | 34.485556°N 91.559722°W |
| KWIK | Pocatello, Idaho | 35885 | C | 0.96 | 0.96 | | 42.924167°N 112.458611°W |
| KWLC | Decorah, Iowa | 39255 | C | 1 | 1 | | 43.309722°N 91.808333°W |
| KXIT | Dalhart, Texas | 15300 | C | | | 1 | 36.095833°N 102.510556°W |
| KXLE | Ellensburg, Washington | 35958 | C | 1 | 1 | | 47.0025°N 120.525278°W |
| KXOX | Sweetwater, Texas | 63197 | C | | | 1 | 32.487778°N 100.391944°W |
| KXYL | Brownwood, Texas | 71105 | C | | | 1 | 31.705833°N 98.995833°W |
| WALO | Humacao, Puerto Rico | 50011 | C | | | 1 | 18.146944°N 65.813611°W |
| WATN | Watertown, New York | 11624 | C | | | 1 | 43.980278°N 75.936667°W |
| WATT | Cadillac, Michigan | 65928 | C | 1 | 1 | | 44.224167°N 85.4°W |
| WBBW | Youngstown, Ohio | 13667 | C | | | 1 | 41.080556°N 80.648333°W |
| WBEJ | Elizabethton, Tennessee | 9431 | C | | | 1 | 36.335278°N 82.2175°W |
| WBGC | Chipley, Florida | 27538 | C | | | 1 | 30.771944°N 85.558611°W |
| WCBY | Cheboygan, Michigan | 56074 | C | 1 | 1 | | 45.658333°N 84.49°W |
| WCNC | Elizabeth City, North Carolina | 49438 | C | | | 1 | 36.310556°N 76.232222°W |
| WDNE | Elkins, West Virginia | 40182 | C | 1 | 1 | | 38.923333°N 79.8625°W |
| WDXY | Sumter, South Carolina | 55267 | C | | | 1 | 33.904444°N 80.323611°W |
| WEBJ | Brewton, Alabama | 19823 | C | | | 1 | 31.109722°N 87.06°W |
| WEBQ | Harrisburg, Illinois | 70348 | C | | | 1 | 37.7175°N 88.543611°W |
| WEKR | Fayetteville, Tennessee | 32199 | C | | | 1 | 35.157778°N 86.590278°W |
| WENK | Union City, Tennessee | 71504 | C | 1 | 1 | | 36.427778°N 89.034722°W |
| WFOY | St. Augustine, Florida | 60271 | C | 0.5 | 0.5 | | 29.850278°N 81.330278°W |
| WFTM | Maysville, Kentucky | 62215 | C | | | 1 | 38.636111°N 83.760556°W |
| WFTN | Franklin, New Hampshire | 49391 | C | | | 1 | 43.454444°N 71.6425°W |
| WFUZ | Wilkes-Barre, Pennsylvania | 66365 | C | | | 1 | 41.253611°N 75.906944°W |
| WGBB | Freeport, New York | 72091 | C | 1 | 1 | | 40.645556°N 73.5775°W |
| WGCM | Gulfport, Mississippi | 31216 | C | 0.94 | 0.94 | | 30.429167°N 89.019444°W |
| WGGA | Gainesville, Georgia | 32977 | C | 1 | 1 | | 34.316944°N 83.829167°W |
| WGMN | Roanoke, Virginia | 37746 | C | | | 1 | 37.27°N 79.970556°W |
| WGTX | West Yarmouth, Massachusetts | 6251 | C | 1 | 1 | | 41.635278°N 70.235°W |
| WGVA | Geneva, New York | 36290 | C | | | 1 | 42.860278°N 77.016389°W |
| WHBU | Anderson, Indiana | 2212 | C | 0.7 | 0.7 | | 40.073611°N 85.699444°W |
| WHFA | Poynette, Wisconsin | 54617 | C | 1 | 1 | | 43.360556°N 89.402222°W |
| WHIZ | Zanesville, Ohio | 61218 | C | 1 | 0.96 | | 39.955556°N 81.983611°W |
| WHVN | Charlotte, North Carolina | 72331 | C | 1 | 1 | | 35.2°N 80.810833°W |
| WIFA | Knoxville, Tennessee | 61041 | C | | | 1 | 35.954722°N 83.951111°W |
| WIGY | Lewiston, Maine | 11031 | C | 1 | 0.86 | | 44.115278°N 70.248611°W |
| WJEJ | Hagerstown, Maryland | 25828 | C | | | 1 | 39.666667°N 77.725°W |
| WJIM | Lansing, Michigan | 17382 | C | 0.89 | 0.89 | | 42.72°N 84.519722°W |
| WJLX | Jasper, Alabama | 54798 | C | | | 1 | 33.815°N 87.271944°W |
| WJMC | Rice Lake, Wisconsin | 67196 | C | | | 1 | 45.508611°N 91.773889°W |
| WJNC | Jacksonville, North Carolina | 73143 | C | | | 1 | 34.748889°N 77.414167°W |
| WJON | St. Cloud, Minnesota | 73144 | C | 1 | 1 | | 45.56°N 94.139167°W |
| WJTN | Jamestown, New York | 29922 | C | 0.5 | 1 | | 42.104722°N 79.2575°W |
| WKDK | Newberry, South Carolina | 48706 | C | | | 1 | 34.291667°N 81.620833°W |
| WKEZ | Bluefield, West Virginia | 44001 | C | | | 1 | 37.265833°N 81.188889°W |
| WKIQ | Eustis, Florida | 29339 | C | | | 0.79 | 28.838611°N 81.696111°W |
| WLAG | La Grange, Georgia | 32980 | C | | | 1 | 33.04°N 85.024167°W |
| WLLV | Louisville, Kentucky | 1125 | C | 0.53 | 0.53 | | 38.230278°N 85.822222°W (daytime); 38.230556°N 85.822222°W (nighttime) |
| WLSQ | Loris, South Carolina | 29541 | C | 1 | 1 | | 34.034722°N 78.882778°W |
| WMFG | Hibbing, Minnesota | 60911 | C | 1 | 1 | | 47.408333°N 92.951111°W |
| WMGJ | Gadsden, Alabama | 21817 | C | | | 1 | 34.001111°N 86.03°W |
| WMIS | Natchez, Mississippi | 47456 | C | | | 1 | 31.520556°N 91.385833°W |
| WMMB | Melbourne, Florida | 11408 | C | | | 1 | 28.077778°N 80.598611°W |
| WMSO | Southaven, Mississippi | 2801 | C | | | 0.58 | 34.9825°N 90.0125°W |
| WNVL | Nashville, Tennessee | 16898 | C | | | 1 | 36.156389°N 86.771111°W |
| WOBT | Rhinelander, Wisconsin | 49801 | C | 0.95 | 1 | | 45.628333°N 89.393889°W |
| WOMT | Manitowoc, Wisconsin | 59610 | C | | | 0.992 | 44.125278°N 87.628056°W |
| WOON | Woonsocket, Rhode Island | 73676 | C | 1 | 1 | | 42.016111°N 71.491667°W |
| WPAX | Thomasville, Georgia | 37034 | C | 1 | 1 | | 30.836667°N 83.978889°W |
| WPJL | Raleigh, North Carolina | 73884 | C | | | 1 | 35.773611°N 78.619167°W |
| WPKE | Pikeville, Kentucky | 18225 | C | 1 | 1 | | 37.480556°N 82.526389°W |
| WPTR | Schenectady, New York | 8726 | C | | | 1 | 42.810278°N 73.984444°W |
| WRLD | Reading, Pennsylvania | 55307 | C | | | 1 | 40.324444°N 75.941944°W |
| WRTA | Altoona, Pennsylvania | 67505 | C | | | 1 | 40.507222°N 78.420833°W |
| WSBC | Chicago, Illinois | 16847 | C | | | 1 | 41.981389°N 87.772222°W |
| WSDR | Sterling, Illinois | 37207 | C | 0.5 | 1 | | 41.816389°N 89.670278°W |
| WSFC | Somerset, Kentucky | 21626 | C | | | 0.79 | 37.1175°N 84.611667°W |
| WSKI | Montpelier, Vermont | 23049 | C | | | 1 | 44.244444°N 72.546389°W |
| WSNJ | Bridgeton, New Jersey | 12212 | C | 1 | 1 | | 39.458889°N 75.203333°W |
| WSQL | Brevard, North Carolina | 54616 | C | | | 1 | 35.223056°N 82.705556°W |
| WSYY | Millinocket, Maine | 33469 | C | | | 1 | 45.673333°N 68.718611°W |
| WTAX | Springfield, Illinois | 9961 | C | | | 1 | 39.793333°N 89.605°W |
| WTON | Staunton, Virginia | 50077 | C | | | 1 | 38.141667°N 79.0425°W |
| WTPS | Petersburg, Virginia | 60474 | C | | | 1 | 37.233611°N 77.376667°W |
| WTWA | Thomson, Georgia | 8746 | C | 0.6 | 0.6 | | 33.472222°N 82.517222°W |
| WVOS | Liberty, New York | 43980 | C | | | 1 | 41.781667°N 74.730278°W |
| WVSL | Saranac Lake, New York | 73314 | C | | | 1 | 44.316111°N 74.118889°W |
| WVTS | Dunbar, West Virginia | 2682 | C | 1 | 1 | | 38.385556°N 81.714167°W |
| WWCO | Waterbury, Connecticut | 40678 | C | | | 1 | 41.566389°N 73.056389°W |
| WWNS | Statesboro, Georgia | 54804 | C | | | 0.71 | 32.455278°N 81.774444°W |
| WWWC | Wilkesboro, North Carolina | 22017 | C | | | 1 | 36.15°N 81.161667°W |
| WWZQ | Aberdeen, Mississippi | 65201 | C | | | 1 | 33.808889°N 88.5425°W |
| WZCC | Cross City, Florida | 73408 | C | | | 1 | 29.609722°N 83.134167°W |
| WZQK | Flowood, Mississippi | 52026 | C | | | 0.88 | 32.300833°N 90.136667°W |

Between 1951 and 1963, the frequency was also one of two used for the United States' CONELRAD emergency broadcasting system, the other frequency being 640 AM.
