= WJBE =

WJBE may refer to:

- WJBE (AM), a radio station (1040 AM) licensed to serve Powell, Tennessee, United States
- WJBE-FM, a radio station (88.5 FM) licensed to serve Five Points, Alabama, United States
- WEMG (Tennessee), a defunct Knoxville, Tennessee, radio station (1430 AM) that used the call letters WJBE from 1968 to 1979 when owned by James Brown
