= WMPS (disambiguation) =

WMPS may refer to:

- WMPS, a radio station (1210 AM) licensed to Bartlett, Tennessee, United States
- WHRK, a radio station (97.1 FM) licensed to Memphis, Tennessee, United States, which formerly used the call sign WMPS-FM from 1959 to 1977
- WIVG, a radio station (96.1 FM) licensed to Tunica, Mississippi, United States, which formerly used the call sign WMPS from 1998 to 2001
- WLRM, a radio station (1380 AM) licensed to Millington, Tennessee, United States, which used the call sign WMPS from 1983 until 1998
- WMFS (AM), a radio station (680 AM) licensed to Memphis, Tennessee, United States, which used the call sign WMPS from 1937 until 1983
- Warrior Modular Protection System, an upgrade to the Warrior tracked armoured vehicle
