= WAGC =

WAGC may refer to:

- WAGC-LD 14 (50.1), a defunct low-power television station formerly licensed to Atlanta, Georgia, United States
- WLMR 1450, which signed-on in 1946 as WAGC in Chattanooga, Tennessee
- WZTQ 1560, which signed-on in 1962 as WAGC in Centre, Alabama
- World Amateur Go Championship

== See also ==
- WAGC-3, an Indian locomotive
- WAGC-385, the designation of the USS Biscayne
