= Ben Zobrist =

American baseball player (born 1981)

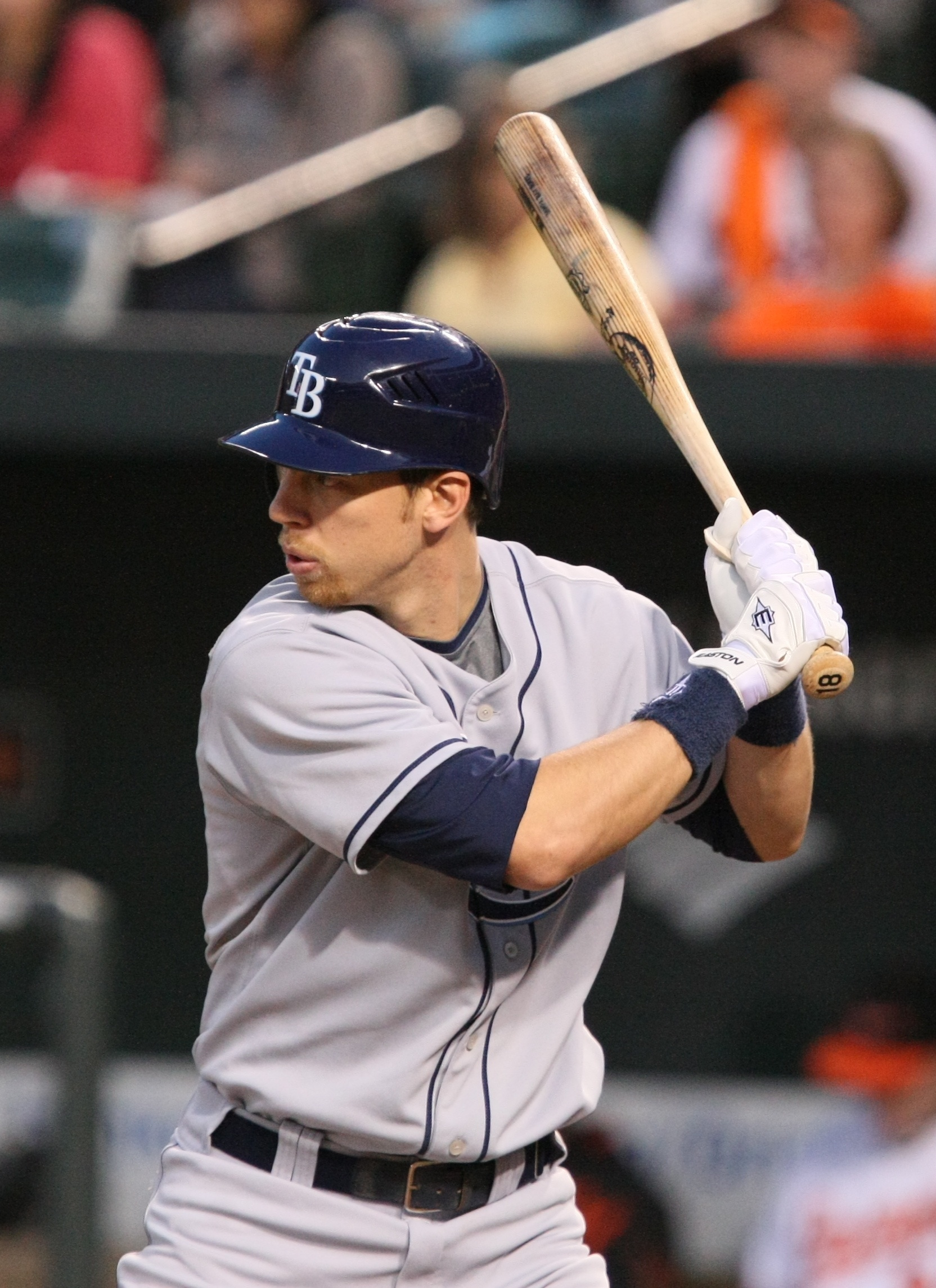
- Zobrist with the Tampa Bay Rays in 2009
- Second baseman / Outfielder
- Born: May 26, 1981 (age 45); Eureka, Illinois, U.S.
- Batted: Switch Threw: Right

MLB debut
- August 1, 2006, for the Tampa Bay Devil Rays

Last MLB appearance
- September 29, 2019, for the Chicago Cubs

MLB statistics
- Batting average: .266
- Home runs: 167
- Runs batted in: 768
- Stats at Baseball Reference

Teams
- Tampa Bay Devil Rays / Rays (2006–2014); Oakland Athletics (2015); Kansas City Royals (2015); Chicago Cubs (2016–2019)

Career highlights and awards
- 3× All-Star (2009, 2013, 2016); 2× World Series champion (2015, 2016); World Series MVP (2016)

Benjamin Thomas Zobrist (/ˈzoʊbrɪst/; born May 26, 1981) is an American former professional baseball second baseman and outfielder. He played in Major League Baseball (MLB) for the Tampa Bay Devil Rays/Rays, Oakland Athletics, Kansas City Royals, and Chicago Cubs. Zobrist played in three World Series and won the last two, becoming a two-time World Series champion in consecutive seasons of 2015 with the Royals and 2016 with the Cubs. He was the World Series MVP in 2016. Zobrist also played for the United States national team.

A versatile defender and a switch-hitter with a high walk rate, he played roughly half his innings at second base, and spent significant time at shortstop and the outfield positions. Thus, he has often been referred to as a "super utility player," with subsequent players who also filled this role often being compared to Zobrist.

== Early life ==
Benjamin Thomas Zobrist was born on May 26, 1981, and raised in Eureka, Illinois, by his parents Cynthia "Cindi" (née Cali) and Tom Zobrist, senior pastor of Liberty Bible Church in Eureka. He grew up a St. Louis Cardinals fan.

Zobrist played baseball starting when he was eight years old; he and his friends built their own wiffle ball field behind his house. Zobrist attended Eureka High School, graduating in 2000. After no professional scouts or college recruiters considered him by the time he graduated, Zobrist thought baseball was over for him. "Baseball was not even a thought in my mind", Zobrist said, "When I was done with my last high school game, I was driving around town just thinking I'm done with baseball the rest of my life."

He planned to attend Calvary Bible College in Kansas City, Missouri, but his high school coach Bob Gold encouraged him to spend $50 to participate in an annual summer event that showcased seniors in Peoria, Illinois. He played in the showcase, and was given an offer to play college baseball at Olivet Nazarene University, which he accepted.

== College career ==
In his time at Olivet Nazarene University, Zobrist pitched and also played at shortstop and second base. In 2002, he was named to both the All-CCAC and All-Region VII First-Teams, and received NAIA Honorable Mention All-America status. He was named the Chicagoland Collegiate Athletic Conference Player of the Year, first team All-Region VII, and first team NAIA All-America in 2003. He transferred to Dallas Baptist University for his senior year, where he played shortstop and batted .378 with a .590 slugging percentage.

Zobrist played for the Twin City Stars of the Central Illinois Collegiate League in 2002, and then for the Wisconsin Woodchucks of the collegiate summer league Northwoods League in 2003. He was voted team MVP and led his team to the league championship.

== Professional career ==
=== Tampa Bay Devil Rays / Rays (2006–2014) ===
Zobrist was drafted by the Houston Astros as a shortstop in the sixth round of the 2004 MLB draft. With right-handed pitcher Mitch Talbot, Zobrist was traded to the Tampa Bay Rays for first baseman/designated hitter Aubrey Huff and cash on July 12, 2006.

==== 2006–2008: Debut and first World Series ====
Zobrist made his MLB debut with Tampa Bay on August 1, 2006. He exclusively played shortstop in his first two seasons with Tampa Bay.

Zobrist struggled through parts of the 2006 and 2007 seasons with the Rays. One day, he met a "swing mechanic" (batting coach) looking for students. The swing coach was able to help Zobrist, and it was evident to the Rays during the 2008 season. "He added the power component", Rays executive vice president Andrew Friedman said, "He became a lot more physical."

Zobrist was a right fielder and a backup shortstop during the 2008 season. Zobrist went to his first World Series as a player with the Rays. His versatility was showcased during Game 3 of the 2008 World Series against the Philadelphia Phillies, when he came in as part of a double switch to play right field.

==== 2009–2010: First All-Star Game and extension ====
Zobrist was placed in right field for the beginning of the 2009 season, and was made the starting second baseman Akinori Iwamura was injured. Zobrist enjoyed a breakout season, finishing fourth in the American League in on-base percentage (.405), sixth in walks (91), and seventh in slugging percentage (.543). He earned a trip to his first All-Star Game in St. Louis in 2009. The Tampa Bay Chapter of the Baseball Writers' Association of America named him MVP of the Rays for 2009.

Zobrist led all hitters in the majors in 2009 for wins above replacement with 8.6, ahead of Albert Pujols' 8.4 WAR.

On April 23, 2010, Zobrist and the Rays agreed to a three-year contract extension through the 2013 season, with a team option for 2014 and 2015, a deal potentially worth $30 million. In 2010, Zobrist batted .238, with a .353 slugging percentage.

==== 2011: WAR leader ====
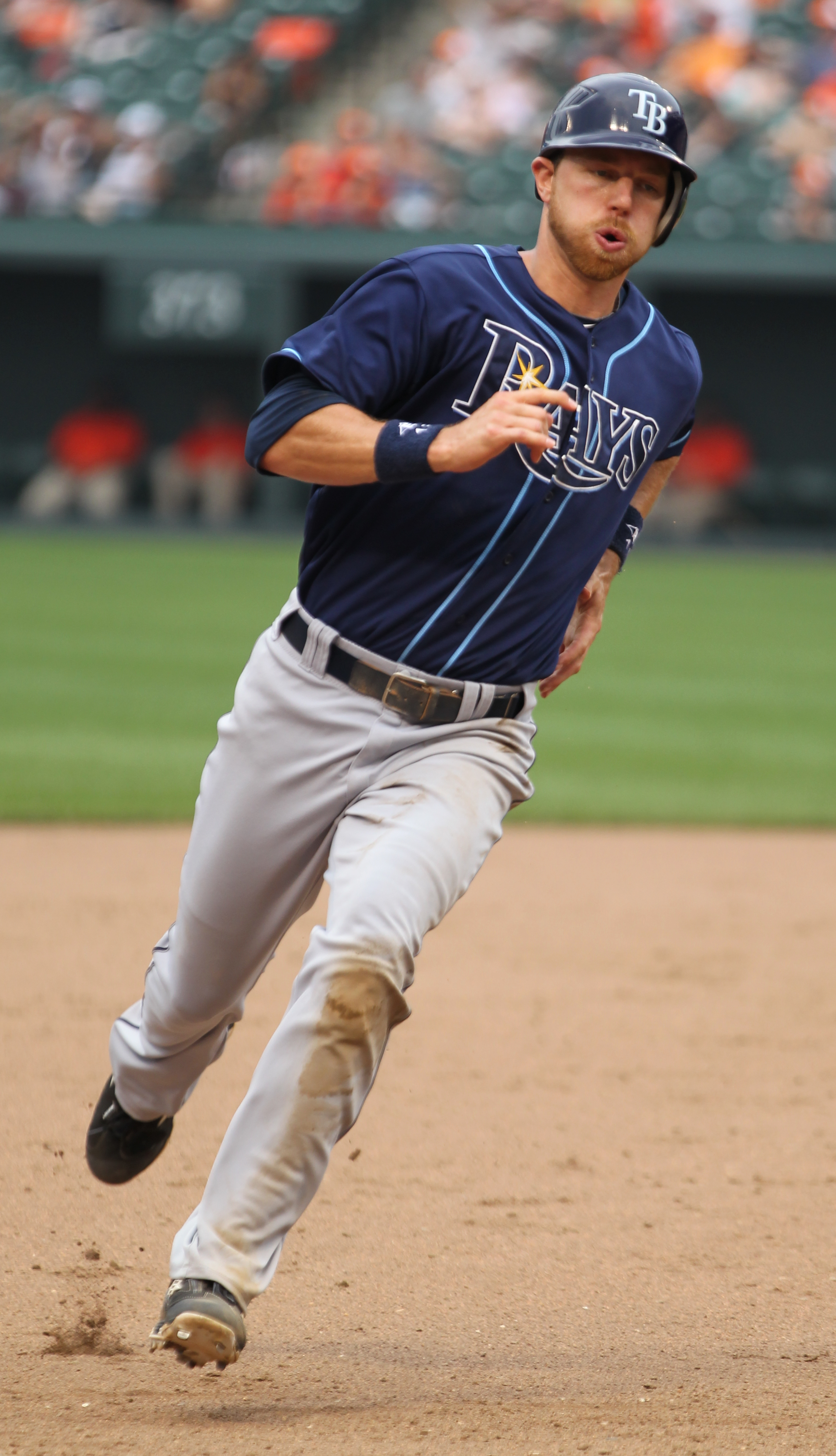
Zobrist with the Tampa Bay Rays in 2011

On April 28, 2011, Zobrist collected a Tampa Bay Rays record eight RBIs in a 15–3 rout of the Minnesota Twins. Another game was held during the day to make up for a previously rained out game and Zobrist drove in another two runs, making a total 10 RBIs for the day.

Zobrist led the American League in Wins above replacement (WAR) with 8.8, ahead of Most Valuable Player (MVP) Justin Verlander and MVP runner up Jacoby Ellsbury.

==== 2012–2014: Second All-Star Game ====
During the 2012 season, Zobrist played multiple positions. He played 47 games at shortstop, the most since his rookie season. He was also used as an outfielder and second baseman.

Zobrist finished the year with 20 home runs, accomplishing the feat for the second consecutive season.

On April 8, 2013, Zobrist became the strikeout victim on a disputed call that led to Joe Nathan's 300th career save. Zobrist was named an All-Star for the second time of his career. He finished the 2013 season with a .275 batting average, his highest since 2009.

On September 10, Zobrist recorded his 1,000th career hit, which came against the New York Yankees in Yankee Stadium.

A sign of his superutility, when Zobrist left the Rays following the 2014 season, he had the highest wRC+ in franchise history (minimum 500 plate appearances) as a second basemen, right fielder and shortstop. As of 2026, he ranks third in franchise history in terms of WAR, according to Baseball Reference, with 35.3, trailing Carl Crawford and Evan Longoria.

=== Oakland Athletics (2015) ===
On January 10, 2015, Zobrist was traded to the Oakland Athletics with Yunel Escobar in exchange for John Jaso, Daniel Robertson, and Boog Powell. On Opening Day with the Athletics, Zobrist hit a two-run home run in his first at-bat. On April 25, 2015, it was revealed that Zobrist had a torn medial meniscus in his left knee, putting him on the 15-day disabled list. The knee required surgery, keeping Zobrist out of action for 4–6 weeks.

=== Kansas City Royals (2015) ===
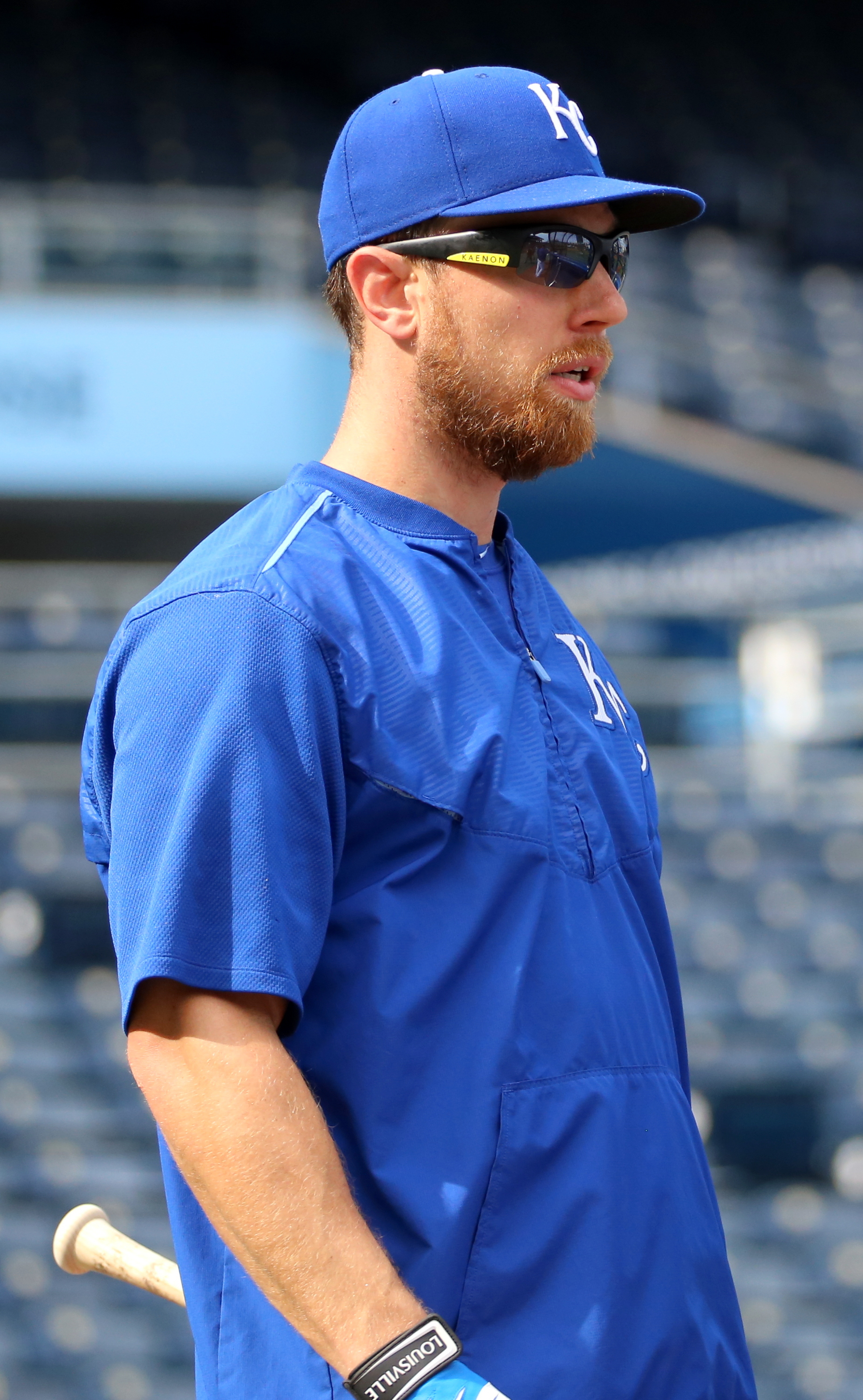
Zobrist with the Kansas City Royals in 2015

On July 28, 2015, Zobrist was traded to the Kansas City Royals for Sean Manaea and Aaron Brooks. He played 59 games in the regular season for Kansas City and finished with a batting average of .284, with 7 home runs, 37 runs scored, and 23 RBIs.

The Royals won the AL Central Division and played the Houston Astros for the ALDS with Zobrist starting all five games. The Royals advanced to the World Series after defeating the Toronto Blue Jays in six games to win the American League pennant. The Royals won the 2015 World Series after defeating the New York Mets in four of the five games played. Zobrist played second base and batted second in every game of the 2015 Royals postseason. He hit .303 in the 2015 postseason with 66 at bats, 15 runs scored, 20 hits, 2 home runs, and 6 RBIs.

=== Chicago Cubs (2016–2019) ===
==== 2016: World Series MVP ====
On December 8, 2015, Zobrist agreed to a four-year, $56 million contract with the Chicago Cubs. He reunited with Joe Maddon, his manager when he played with Tampa Bay. In 2016, he batted .272/.386/.446 and led the major leagues with 1.17 walks per strikeout.

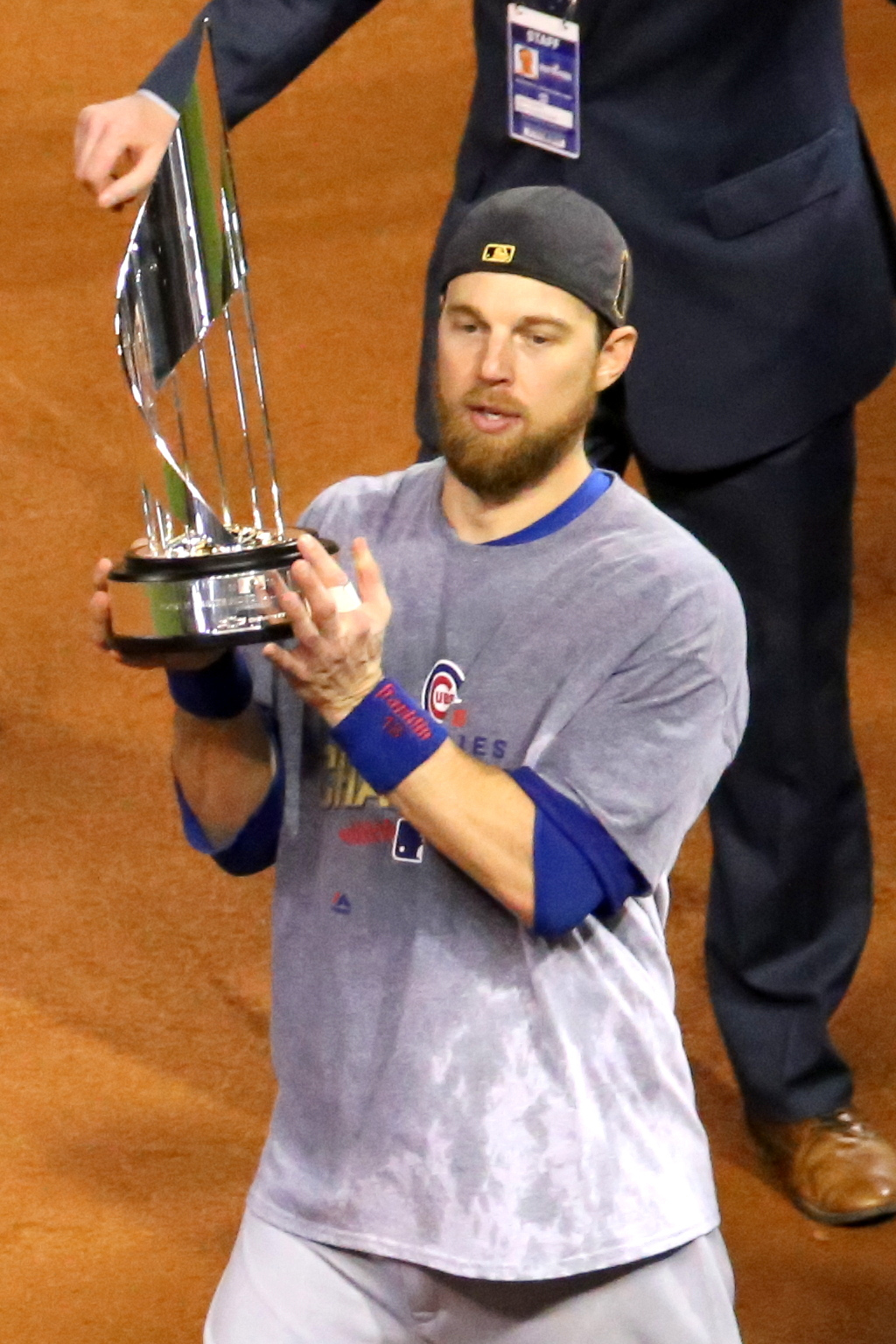
Zobrist with the World Series MVP Award in 2016

In Game 4 of the National League Division Series against the San Francisco Giants with the Cubs having a 2–1 series lead, Zobrist drove in Kris Bryant to score the first run in the top of the ninth and later scored the tying run on a two-run single by Willson Contreras. The Cubs scored another run later that inning, sending them to the National League Championship Series. Following the Cubs' Game 7 victory in the World Series, after driving in the first of two go-ahead runs in the top of the 10th inning, he was named the World Series Most Valuable Player and received his second World Series ring. He became the eighth player in major league history to win consecutive World Series championships on different teams.

==== 2017–2019 ====
In 2017, Zobrist played in 159 games, batting .232/.318/.375. Playing five different positions, he committed only three errors and had a fielding percentage of .991. He was a finalist for the Gold Glove Award at second base, along with Dee Gordon and winner DJ LeMahieu.

In 2018, he had a career-high batting average of .305. He was ejected for the first time in his career on August 14, 2018, by home plate umpire Phil Cuzzi.

In 2019, Zobrist started the season playing in 26 games before being placed on the restricted list on May 6 to deal with a family matter. Both Zobrist and his wife filed for legal separation in May. Zobrist announced his return in late July 2019, and began rehab assignments with the South Bend Cubs and Myrtle Beach Pelicans. He returned to the Cubs in early September. Zobrist had his first major league pitching appearance in September 2019, striking out Yadier Molina. In 2019 he batted .260/.358/.313 with one home run in 150 at bats.

=== Retirement ===
In February 2020, Jon Heyman reported that Zobrist was not planning to play in the 2020 season. Zobrist confirmed his retirement on March 6, and said he was open to joining the Cubs in a non-player capacity "down the line".

He received zero Baseball Hall of Fame votes from the Baseball Writers' Association of America in his sole year on the ballot in 2025. This came despite advocacy from Foolish Bailey, with one writer-voter, John Romano of the Tampa Bay Times, reflecting in a dedicated column that Zobrist's "case for the Hall is pretty shaky" but he deserves more recognition than he ended up receiving from Hall of Fame voters.

== Player profile ==
Zobrist was an above-average hitter with a career slash line of .266/.357/.426 and a wRC+ of 116. He accomplished this with a patient, contact-based approach; his swing rate was one of the lowest in the league, leading to a walk rate of 12.5% and a contact rate of 85.3%. He was also an above-average baserunner, who had 116 stolen bases at a success rate of 70%.

Zobrist was noted for his defensive versatility. He played over 4,200 defensive innings at second base, over 2,200 in right field, over 1,700 at shortstop, and over 500 innings at other outfield positions. Zobrist was rated by ultimate zone rating as a significantly above-average defender at second and in right, and a marginally below-average defender at shortstop.

His nickname, "Zorilla," was given to him by his manager Joe Maddon while playing for the Rays in 2009. Zobrist chose "Zorilla" as his nickname for the Players Weekend during the 2017 season.

== Personal life ==
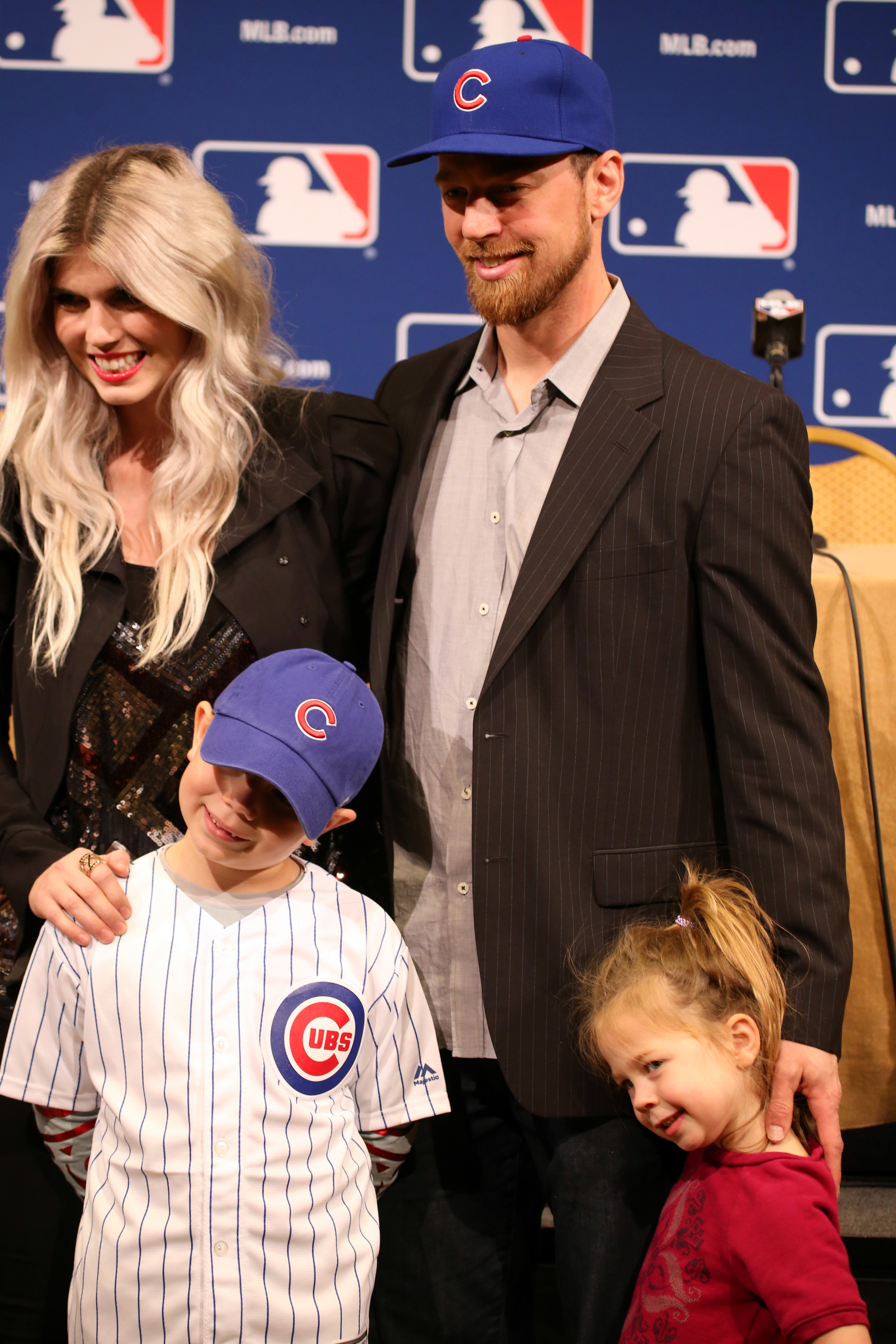
Zobrist and his family in 2015

Zobrist lives in Franklin, Tennessee. He and his former wife, singer Julianna Glasse (née Gilmore), have three children, one of whom was born five days after Zobrist's Royals won the 2015 World Series. Julianna gave birth the day after the Royals World Series parade. In May 2019, Zobrist filed for legal separation in Tennessee on the same day that she filed for divorce in Illinois. Their marital problems had led Zobrist to pause his participation in the 2019 MLB season.

In June 2021, Zobrist filed a lawsuit in Tennessee against his former pastor, Byron Yawn, in which he accused Yawn of defrauding Zobrist's charity, Patriot Forward, of millions of dollars. The lawsuit also alleged that Yawn had had a year-long sexual affair with Julianna beginning in the spring of 2019. In a deposition for the divorce, she admitted to the affair. In August 2021, Zobrist dropped his lawsuit against Yawn.

Zobrist was counselor for Camp of Champions USA, a Christian summer day camp in central Illinois. He speaks at church events about his early life and success, which he credits all to God.

In the 2013 film Ring The Bell, released by Provident Films, Zobrist plays himself in a cameo role alongside Rick Sutcliffe, John Kruk, Mark Hall (also playing themselves), Ryan Scharoun, Ashley Anderson McCarthy, and Casey Bond.
