= Q102 =

Q102 may refer to:

- Quran 102, the 102nd chapter of the Islamic Holy book

== Transportation ==
- Q102 (New York City bus)

== Radio stations ==
- Q102 (Pirate Station) in London, United Kingdom; the precursor to XFM London
- Q102.9 in Derry, Northern Ireland
- Dublin's Q102 in Dublin, Ireland
- KMXF in Lowell, Arkansas (former incarnation)
- KOOO in La Vista, Nebraska (former incarnation)
- KQIB in Isabel, Oklahoma
- KQIC in Willmar, Minnesota
- KQRA in Springfield, Missouri
- KQST in Flagstaff, Arizona
- KRBQ in San Francisco, California
- KDGE in Fort Worth/Dallas, Texas (former incarnation)
- KYDA in Azle, Texas (former incarnation)
- WEKV in Central City, Kentucky (former incarnation)
- WIFT in DuBois, Pennsylvania
- WIOQ in Philadelphia, Pennsylvania
- WKRQ in Cincinnati, Ohio
- WJST in Albany, Georgia (USA)
- WQTC-FM in Manitowoc, Wisconsin
- WQTU in Rome, Georgia (USA)
- WSQL in Brevard, North Carolina
- WYBR in Big Rapids, Michigan (former incarnation)
- WZDQ in Humboldt, Tennessee (former incarnation)
