= KCRK-FM =

- Colville, Washington; United States
- Frequency: 92.1 MHz

Programming
- Format: Adult contemporary

Ownership
- Owner: North Country Broadcasting
- Sister stations: KCVL

History
- Former call signs: KCRK (1981–1981)

Technical information
- Licensing authority: FCC
- Facility ID: 49196
- Class: A
- ERP: 5,400 watts
- HAAT: 105 meters
- Transmitter coordinates: 48°34′29.6″N 117°55′3.9″W

Links
- Public license information: Public file; LMS
- Website: kcvl.com

KCRK-FM (92.1 FM) is a radio station licensed to Colville, Washington, United States. The station is currently owned by North Country Broadcasting.

== History of call letters ==
The call letters KCRK were previously assigned to an FM station in Cedar Rapids, Iowa, that began broadcasting November 16, 1947. It was owned by the Cedar Rapids Gazette newspaper and operated on 96.9 MHz.
