= WMQM =

Coordinates: 35°10′34″N 89°56′10″W

Lakeland, Tennessee; United States
- Broadcast area: Memphis metropolitan area
- Frequency: 1600 kHz

Programming
- Format: Christian radio

Ownership
- Owner: F. W. Robbert Broadcasting, Inc.
- Sister stations: WITA, WLRM, WNQM, WVOG, WWCR

History
- First air date: April 27, 1955
- Former call signs: WKBJ (1955–2002)
- Call sign meaning: "Memphis Qualify Ministries"

Technical information
- Licensing authority: FCC
- Facility ID: 42369
- Class: D
- Power: 50,000 watts (day); 35 watts (night)
- Translator: 93.3 W227DQ (Lakeland)

Links
- Public license information: Public file; LMS
- Webcast: Listen live Listen live Streaming URL
- Website: 1600wmqm.com; wwcr.com/wmqm.html

WMQM (1600 AM) is a commercial radio station licensed to Lakeland, Tennessee, United States, and serving the Memphis metropolitan area. It broadcasts a Christian format and is owned by F. W. Robbert Broadcasting, Inc., who also operates shortwave radio station WWCR.

The transmitter is located off of Whittier Road at Ruskin Road. Programming is also heard on 140-watt FM translator W227DQ at 93.3 MHz.

== History ==
The station signed on the air on April 27, 1955. Its original call sign was WKBJ and its city of license was Milan, Tennessee. WKBJ was a daytimer station operated by Milan Broadcasting Company, Inc. It was required to go off the air at night. WKBJ added a sister station in 1964, WKBJ-FM at 92.3 MHz (now WHHG). Milan is about 100 miles (160 km) northeast of Memphis so its signal did not reach the larger city.

On December 3, 2001, WKBJ applied to the Federal Communications Commission (FCC) to relocate the station to Lakeland, Tennessee. That would allow advertising to be sold in the more lucrative Memphis radio market. It would also get a boost in daytime power to 50,000 watts and could broadcast around the clock. The application was granted when KJIW AM 1600 in West Helena, Arkansas, surrendered its license and went silent.

On February 26, 2002, the FCC accepted the sale of WKBJ to WMQM, Inc. The call sign was changed to WMQM on May 29, 2002. (The "WMQM" call letters were previously assigned to AM 1480 in Memphis, now WBBP.) On December 21, 2002, WMQM began broadcasting from its new location in Memphis.

WMQM served as the original flagship station of The Political Cesspool, a weekly far-right talk radio show founded by Tennessee political activist James Edwards in 2004. It shifted to sister station WLRM a year later and also began simulcasting on the neo-Nazi Stormfront Radio.
