= KORA-FM =

Radio station in Bryan, Texas

Coordinates: 30.650°N 96.350°W

- Bryan, Texas; United States
- Broadcast area: Bryan–College Station
- Frequency: 98.3 MHz (HD Radio)
- Branding: 98-3 KORA

Programming
- Format: Country
- Subchannels: HD2: Classic country; HD3: “Classic Hits 102.3 & 107.3” Classic hits

Ownership
- Owner: Brazos Valley Communications, LLC

History
- First air date: April 4, 1966
- Call sign meaning: Kora, given name of the mother of the original owner

Technical information
- Licensing authority: FCC
- Facility ID: 62003
- Class: A
- ERP: 900 watts
- HAAT: 161 m (528 ft)

Links
- Public license information: Public file; LMS
- Webcast: Listen Live
- Website: 983korafm.com

KORA-FM (98.3 MHz) is a long-running radio station in Bryan, Texas currently owned by Brazos Valley Communications, LLC. The format is Country, with emphasis on Nashville and Texas artists and groups. Program Director is Keith James. The station's studios and transmitter are located in Bryan.

Personalities include: The Big D & Bubba with Tamme Morning Show, Brandie Alexander middays, Keith James in the Afternoon, Darby Mckenzie in the Evening, and Texas Nation with Dr. Ron.

== History ==
KORA-FM went on the air April 4, 1966, as the sister to KORA 1240 and carried a format of classical, standards and adult music. On February 10, 1975, KORA-FM adopted a format described as "easy listening country and western". In November of that year, KORA-FM shifted to a more mainstream version of the country format, which it carries to this day.
