= The Political Cesspool =

Far-right radio show in the United States

Political Cesspool
- Genre: Talk show
- Running time: Three hours
- Country of origin: United States
- Home station: WLRM
- Syndicates: Liberty News Radio Network and Accent Radio Network
- Starring: James Edwards, Keith Alexander, Bill Rolen, Winston Smith, Eddie "The Bombardier" Miller
- Created by: James Edwards, Austin Farley
- Produced by: Art Frith
- Recording studio: Millington, Tennessee
- Original release: October 26, 2004 – Present
- No. of episodes: One per week
- Website: thepoliticalcesspool.org
- Podcast: Podbean

The Political Cesspool is a weekly far-right talk radio show founded by Tennessean political activist James Edwards and syndicated by the organizations Liberty News Radio Network and Accent Radio Network in the United States. First broadcast in October 2004 twice a week from radio station WMQM, per Edwards it has been simulcast on Stormfront Radio, a service of the white nationalist Stormfront website and as of 2011 is broadcast on Saturday nights on WLRM, a blues and southern soul radio station in Millington, Tennessee. Its sponsors include the white separatist Council of Conservative Citizens and the Institute for Historical Review, a Holocaust denial group.

According to its statement of principles, the show stands for the "Dispossessed Majority" and represents "a philosophy that is pro-White." It has attracted criticism—including from The Nation, The New Republic, the Stephen Roth Institute, the Southern Poverty Law Center (SPLC), and the Anti-Defamation League—for its promotion of antisemitic, white nationalist and white supremacist views. According to the SPLC, the show has featured a "Who's Who of the radical right", including members of the Ku Klux Klan; they say Edwards has probably done more than anyone in America to promote neo-Nazis, Holocaust deniers and other extremists.

The show features Edwards and his co-hosts Keith Alexander, Bill Rolen, Winston Smith, and Eddie Miller, as well as producer Art Frith. Former staffers include Geoff Melton, Jess Bonds and co-founder Austin Farley. Its guests have included author Jerome Corsi, Minuteman Project leader Jim Gilchrist, former Constitution Party presidential candidate Michael Peroutka, actor Sonny Landham, British National Party leader Nick Griffin, Vermont secessionist Thomas Naylor, and paleoconservative activist Pat Buchanan. It is carried by at least three licensed terrestrial radio stations in the United States and on network feeds on the Galaxy 19 communications satellite.

== Background ==
=== James Edwards ===
Edwards is a far-right political activist from Memphis, Tennessee, described by the Southern Poverty Law Center as a rising figure of the modern white-nationalist movement. He attended Briarcrest Christian School, a private school in Memphis, and in ninth grade transferred into a Christian-nationalist homeschooling program, a decision that he said led him into political activism. In 2000 he volunteered for Pat Buchanan's presidential campaign, and in 2002 ran unsuccessfully for the Tennessee House of Representatives. It was during this campaign that he met fellow activist Austin Farley, who was on the ballot against him. In October of that year, he and Farley established The Political Cesspool.

In 2007, Edwards was part of a panel that appeared on CNN's Paula Zahn Now, along with Roland S. Martin and Jesse Lee Peterson. The purpose was to discuss racial segregation in American cities. He told Zahn that white children should seek out those who share "the same values and traditions and heroes," and that "forced integration" was a "march toward totalitarianism." He said: "Crime and violence follow African-Americans wherever they go, and if you think that is racist, then spend some time on the mean streets of south Memphis." Martin described his remarks as unfit for national television. Edwards made a second appearance on Paula Zahn Now in 2009, during which he said: "Whites are in for the fight of their lives. America is becoming balkanized. We are being robbed of having a future in the very nation our ancestors carved from the wilderness."

In 2010, he became involved with a new party, the American Freedom Party, which advocates white nationalism and a form of economic nationalism known as the Third Position. Also in 2010 he self-published a book, Racism, Schmacism: How Liberals use the "R" Word to Push the Obama Agenda, distributed by CreateSpace, a self-publishing printer.

=== Staff and show history ===
Other staff at The Political Cesspool include Bill Rolen, Eddie "The Bombardier" Miller, Keith Alexander, and Winston Smith. According to the show's website, most of the staff claim descent from Confederate soldiers. The show was initially broadcast on AM 1600 WMQM, a Memphis-based radio station, on Tuesdays and Thursdays. Edwards and Farley invited friends Bill Rolen, a board member of the Council of Conservative Citizens, and Jess Bonds as guest hosts, as well as radio technician Art Frith. Frith had previously worked for a number of other radio stations including American Forces Radio and Television Service (AFRTS) (in Keflavik, Iceland; Anchorage, Alaska; and Nea Makri, Greece), KFQD (in Anchorage), and WBCK (in Battle Creek, Michigan).

In 2005 the group moved to WMQM's Millington-based sister station, AM 1380 WLRM, and switched to a nightly schedule, Monday through Friday. Farley left the program in November of that year. Two years later, Geoff Melton, a former co-host, joined to help set up the show's website and the show entered syndication with Dixie Broadcasting Radio Network. The program went on hiatus on February 15, 2008, because staff members said they needed a break, but returned to the airwaves in June 2008 on WLRM on Saturday nights. One year later, it switched from Republic Broadcasting Network to Liberty News Radio Network. As of August 2009, Bonds and Melton are no longer affiliated with the program. Frith now lives in Nashville, Michigan, but remains a part of the show's staff. Since WLRM is not audited by Arbitron, the show's ratings are unknown. The show is listener-supported and, according to Edwards, receives more donations from Florida than from any other state.

== Statement of principles ==
The Political Cesspool describes its philosophy as "pro-White" and "against political centralization". Its statement of principles, with material borrowed from the Council of Conservative Citizens, reads:

The Political Cesspool Radio Program stands for The Dispossessed Majority. We represent a philosophy that is pro-White and are against political centralization. You can trust The Political Cesspool to give you the "other side of the news"—to report on events which are vital to your welfare but which would otherwise be hushed up or distorted by the controlled press.

We make no attempt to give you "both sides." We'll leave the establishment side to your daily newspaper, television and other radio shows. We will bring to you some of the most renowned thinkers, writers, pundits, activists, entertainers and elected officials each broadcast as our guests. Furthermore, we pledge that The Political Cesspool will correct any meaningful error or fact. Make up your own mind who is being honest with you: the establishment media or The Political Cesspool Radio Program.

1. The United States government should be independent of any international organization of governments and American law should not be imposed by organizations such as the United Nations.
2. America would not be as prosperous, ruggedly individualistic, and a land of opportunity if the founding stock were not Europeans.
3. Since family is the foundation of any strong society, we are against feminism, abortion, and primitivism.
4. Private property rights are inviolable. They come from our God-given right to life.
5. We wish to revive the White birthrate above replacement level fertility and beyond to grow the percentage of Whites in the world relative to other races.
6. Issues such as education, environmental law, and police should be decentralized down to the lowest level to insure natural rights and efficiency.
7. Secession is a right of all people and individuals. It was successful in 1776 and this show honors those who tried to make it successful in 1865.
8. We are cultural conservatives because we have certain morals to which we adhere. We are against homosexuality, vulgarity, loveless sex, and masochism.
9. We wish for American government to stop interfering politically, militarily, and socially outside of the borders of the United States of America. We want non-interventionism.

== Guests ==
The Political Cesspool has over the years featured many guest appearances, including political activists, Holocaust deniers, economists, and musicians. Former Tennessee gubernatorial candidate Carl "Twofeathers" Whitaker, who claims partial Native-American ancestry and is known for his strong support of the Minuteman movement, has appeared on the show, as has conservative Native-American activist David Yeagley. Filmmakers Merlin Miller (A Place to Grow, Jericho), who was the 2012 presidential nominee of the American Third Position (now known as the American Freedom Party), and Craig Bodeker (A Conversation about Race) have featured.

Author Jerome Corsi was interviewed in July 2008. During the discussion he spoke about his financial newsletter, and promoted his book The Obama Nation, which includes several statements that have been widely described as racist; for example, he opined that US President Barack Obama identifies more with his "African blood" than his American roots and that the President "rejects everyone white, including his mother and his grandparents". Corsi scheduled another promotional appearance on The Political Cesspool, but one month later he canceled this appearance, citing "travel plans that changed". Edwards said that he believed the incident "just goes to show what incredible pressure everyone in public life is under to never have anything to do with anyone who speaks up for the interests of white people." Fellow authors John Derbyshire and Steve Sailer have also been guests. In July 2011, WorldNetDaily columnist Ilana Mercer appeared on the show.

Constitution Party nominee Michael Peroutka used his appearance in 2004 to promote his presidential campaign. Party member Michael Goza described the show as "Christian/Constitutionalist", and "a great blessing to our cause". Thomas Naylor, of the Vermont secessionist organization Second Vermont Republic, appeared on the show to celebrate Confederate History Month in April 2007, while American Freedom Party Chairman Bill Johnson appeared to promote his party.

On May 8, 2006, Minuteman Project leader Jim Gilchrist spoke on the program. Co-host Bill Rolen agreed with Gilchrist's view that illegal immigrants' intentions are to "just squat here and plunder whatever social benefits our programs provide them". However, Rolen disagreed with Gilchrist's claim that illegal immigration was "the 21st century slave trade". Gilchrist's colleague in the Minuteman movement, Chris Simcox, has also been a guest of the show.

Paul Babeu, the sheriff of Pinal County, Arizona, appeared on The Political Cesspool on July 10, 2010 to discuss illegal immigration; during the interview, he referred to James Edwards as a "great American". Less than two weeks later, Babeu's spokesman issued an apology, saying that he had not researched the show thoroughly enough before scheduling the interview and that Babeu has a policy of not conducting interviews with hate groups. Babeu himself said that he was "hoodwinked" into appearing on the show and that he rejects "any hate or bigotry". Prior to the interview, cohost Eddie Miller said that "Of all the people we've interviewed on this radio show, I would say the only people that came close to getting me this excited was Dr. David Duke." Following Babeu's spokesman's apology, Edwards alleged that Babeu was aware of the show's true ideology prior to appearing on the show, saying: "For Sheriff Babeu to change his mind and now regret coming on our show, for whatever reason, is his right. For him to act as though he had no idea of our ideology is a lie." As a result of the controversy surrounding Babeu's appearance on the show, Arizona U.S. Senate candidate J. D. Hayworth asked his primary opponent, John McCain, to drop several campaign ads featuring McCain and Babeu. In 2011, another sheriff, Dennis Spruell of Montezuma County, Colorado, also apologized after appearing on the show without knowing its actual agenda.

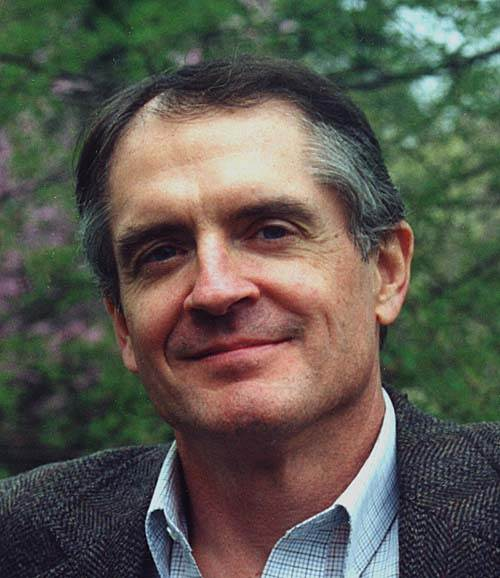
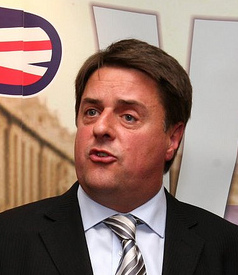
American white supremacist Jared Taylor and British far-right politician Nick Griffin have both been repeat guests on the show; both have argued for forms of racial segregation.

Paleoconservative activist and former presidential candidate Pat Buchanan has appeared twice as of 2011. In a June 2008 interview initiated and arranged by his publicist, he promoted his book Churchill, Hitler and the Unnecessary War. During the broadcast, Buchanan defended Charles Lindbergh against charges of antisemitism, stating that his reputation "has been blackened because of a single speech he gave and a couple of paragraphs in it where he said that ... the Jewish community is beating the drums for war but frankly, no one has said what he said was palpably untrue." At the end of the interview, James Edwards said, "Mr. Buchanan, thank you so much for coming back on our program, for fighting for our people." Previously, in September 2006, Buchanan had made an appearance to promote his book State of Emergency; during this interview, he said that "we are being invaded by people of different cultures" and argued that Americans "cannot survive a bifurcated culture or a heavily Hispanicized culture, tilted towards Mexico ... I think that's the beginning of the end of the United States."

Self-proclaimed "racial realist" Jared Taylor, whom James Edwards considers to be a close friend, has appeared on at least ten occasions. Although describing itself as "America First", the show has also hosted foreign guests, including Croatian white nationalist Tomislav Sunić, Australian white nationalist Drew Fraser, Russian Austrian School economist Yuri N. Maltsev, British lawyer Adrian Davies, Canadian white supremacist Paul Fromm, Canadian conservative blogger Kathy Shaidle, and British National Party (BNP) leaders Simon Darby and Nick Griffin; Griffin appeared as a guest before and after his election to the European Parliament. During his post-election appearance, Griffin attributed the BNP's electoral successes to a fear of "creeping process of Islamification".

Actor Mel Gibson's father, Hutton Gibson, has also appeared on the show. During his appearance, he referred to Pope Benedict XVI as a "homosexual" and claimed that "half the people in the Vatican are queer."

== Controversy and criticism ==
The show has frequently been criticised by anti-racist groups and individuals (such as the Southern Poverty Law Center (SPLC), Anti-Defamation League (ADL), Stephen Roth Institute, and journalist Max Blumenthal) over its stated ideology. The Political Cesspool was added to the Southern Poverty Law Center's hate group watch list in 2006. James Edwards was "ecstatic", saying "I don't think you've arrived in the conservative movement until you've made it to the Southern Poverty Law Center's Hate Watch". Edwards describes the SPLC as a group composed of "communists and civil rights hustlers". The SPLC's Hatewatch has referred to The Political Cesspool as "an overtly racist, anti-Semitic radio show hosted by [a] self-avowed white nationalist" and as "the nexus of hate in America". The Anti-Defamation League has also criticized the show; Edwards has attacked the ADL as "America's most powerful hate group" and has claimed that its definition of a "neo-Nazi [is] any white person who disagrees with a Jew".

Author John Avlon, a former speechwriter for Rudy Giuliani, has described The Political Cesspool as "avowedly white supremacist". Max Blumenthal, who reported on an attempt by one of the show's staff to advertise at a rally for Republican vice-presidential candidate Sarah Palin, described The Political Cesspool as having a "racist ideology", and highlighted antisemitic, racist, and homophobic comments that Edwards had made on his blog. The Stephen Roth Institute has also commented on the show, noting that "[James] Edwards openly espoused many of his guests' views and during speeches to extremist audiences, including members of the white supremacist Council of Conservative Citizens and the racist League of the South, he gained the support of a wide array of extremists." In an article about antisemitism in Belgium, the Institute commented on the show's interview with Filip Dewinter, a member of the Belgian Parliament and a leader of the extremist Vlaams Belang movement.

Newsweek used one of Winston Smith's statements to argue that the rise in popularity of white nationalism and supremacy is due to the combination of the late-2000s recession and the election of a black president. Many such groups have been attempting to gain new recruits and increase their political influence by rebranding themselves as defenders of "white heritage" while de-emphasizing their dislike of minorities and Jews. Smith states, "[t]he emphasis is different now. We don't talk as much about what blacks have done to us; we're more focused on ourselves and our own culture."

=== City Park demonstration ===
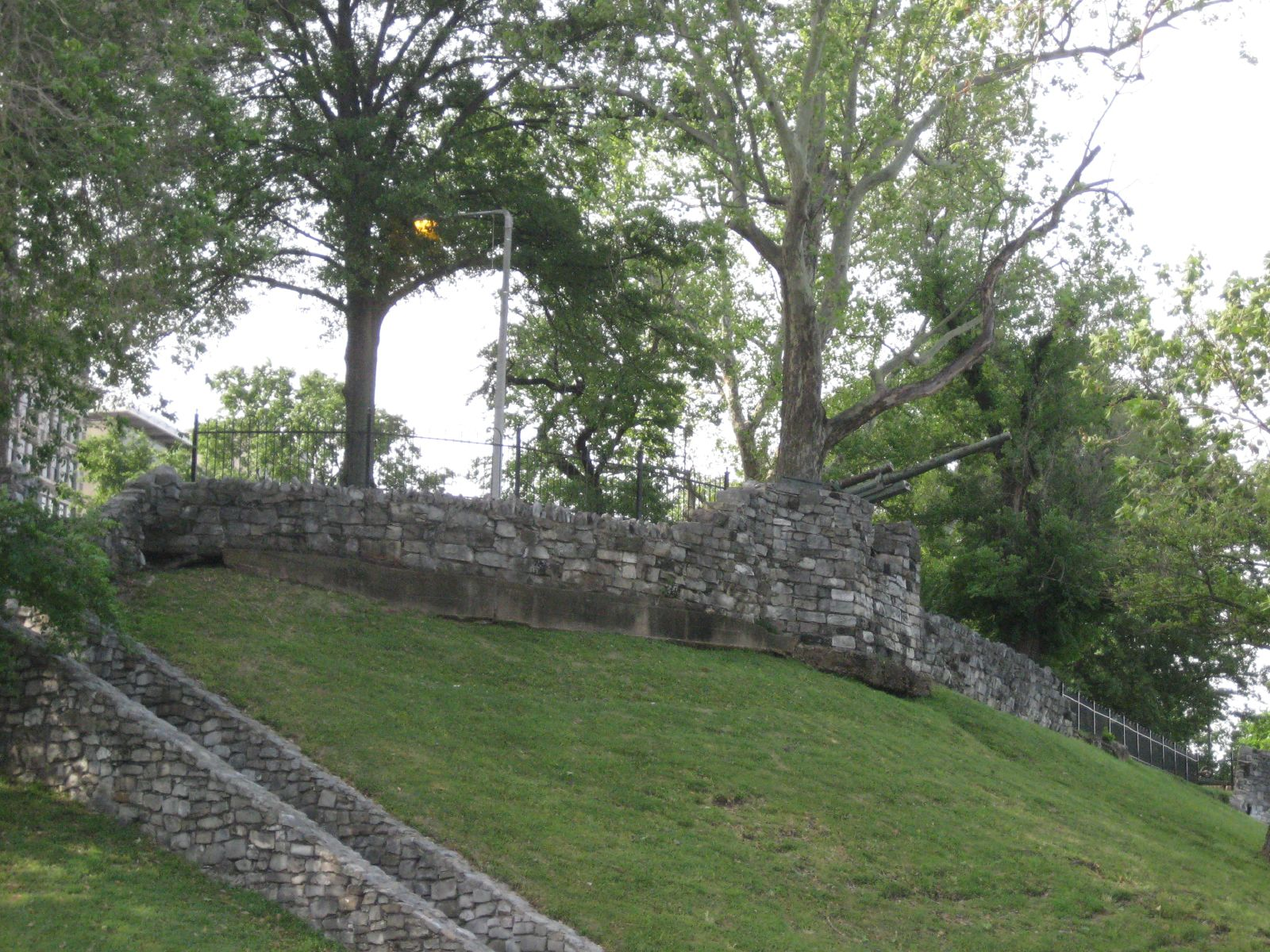
Confederate Park in downtown Memphis, the site of a demonstration organized in 2005 by James Edwards and the staff of The Political Cesspool

In 2005, the staff of The Political Cesspool organized a rally at the Tennessee area known as Confederate Park, which, along with two other Confederacy-themed parks in downtown Memphis, has been the subject of a longtime controversy for honoring Confederate soldiers and ideals. The park had been criticized earlier by a black Shelby County official, which attracted the notice of New York-based activist Al Sharpton, who was invited by the Reverend LaSimba Gray to hold a demonstration in Memphis. Sharpton planned a march called the Rally for Dignity from downtown Memphis to another park honoring Confederate Lieutenant General Nathan Bedford Forrest who was involved early in the organization of the Ku Klux Klan. Sharpton canceled the march after Edwards and The Political Cesspool staff obtained a permit to demonstrate in Confederate Park, located along Sharpton's planned march route.

Sharpton settled for a protest at Forrest Park. At the demonstration, he argued that "We need to show the rest of the world that the day for honoring people like this is over", and said in an interview that his objections were not related to race but to Forrest's Civil War-era (1861–1865) actions against the United States. Estimates of attendance at the rallies vary; according to the Southern Poverty Law Center, James Edwards attracted about 200 white counter-demonstrators to the Confederate Park vigil, while Sharpton's protest at Forrest Park attracted a few dozen black demonstrators, whom Edwards referred to as "rabble". The Memphis Flyer estimated that Sharpton attracted about 250 supporters. In the aftermath of the city park controversy, show affiliates Edwards, Farley, Bonds, and Rolen received the "Dixie Defender Award" from the Sons of Confederate Veterans.

Later that year, Memphis city councilman E. C. Jones awarded Edwards and Farley with a certificate "in appreciation of outstanding contributions to the community". Edwards and Farley also received an honorary city council membership from Jones, who had previously appeared on The Political Cesspool. According to The Commercial Appeal, Jones had not listened to the show before the incident, and was unaware of its ideology. After a reporter informed him of the program's agenda, Jones initially refused to apologize. However, after another reporter confronted him with more details about the show's ideology, he changed his view, saying that he probably would not appear again. Carol Chumney, another member of the Memphis City Council, was also invited to appear on The Political Cesspool, but ultimately declined the invitation after listening to an episode of the show; Chumney said, "what I heard was about advocating for prostitution ... So I told them I had other commitments."

=== Le Journal du Dimanche interview ===
In an interview with the French newspaper Le Journal du Dimanche, cohost Eddie "Bombardier" Miller described the United Nations as "Satan on Earth".

=== Donald Trump Jr. interview ===
In 2016, Edwards co-hosted a Super Tuesday broadcast that interviewed Donald Trump Jr., the son of Republican party then-presidential candidate Donald Trump. Edwards praised the elder Trump and encouraged his supporters to vote for him.

== Radio stations that air the show ==
As of 2011, The Political Cesspool airs on WLRM in Memphis, Tennessee, KHQN in Spanish Fork, Utah; and the Florida-based Accent Radio Network. The Accent Radio Network and KHQN air a shortened two-hour version of the show, in contrast to the three-hour Liberty News Radio Network (WLRM) version.

ARN and Liberty News Radio Network broadcasts their feeds on separate channels on the Galaxy 19 communications satellite.

== See also ==
- American Freedom Party
- Council of Conservative Citizens
