= WNQM =

Coordinates: 36°12′30″N 86°53′38″W

- Nashville, Tennessee; United States
- Frequency: 1300 kHz
- Branding: Nashville Quality Ministries

Programming
- Format: Christian radio
- Affiliations: USA Radio Network

Ownership
- Owner: F. W. Robbert Broadcasting
- Sister stations: WITA; WLRM; WMQM; WVOG; WWCR

History
- First air date: July 1, 1948; 78 years ago
- Former call signs: WMAK (1948–1982); WLUY (1982–1984)
- Call sign meaning: "Nashville Quality Ministries"

Technical information
- Licensing authority: FCC
- Class: B
- Power: 50,000 watts (day); 5,000 watts (night)

Links
- Public license information: Public file; LMS
- Website: 1300wnqm.com

WNQM (1300 AM), is a radio station located in Nashville, Tennessee, owned by F. W. Robbert Broadcasting. It airs a Christian radio format calling itself "Nashville Quality Ministries".

By day, WNQM is powered at 50,000 watts non-directional, the highest power for U.S. AM stations. At night, to protect other stations on 1300 AM from interference, it reduces power to 5,000 watts and uses a directional antenna with a five-tower array. The station's radio studios and transmitter are off Ashland City Highway (Tennessee State Route 12).

== History ==
=== WMAK Top 40 ===
The station, then owned by Texas newspaper publisher Frank W. Mayborn, signed on the air on July 1, 1948. The original call sign was WMAK.

From December 1962 through the 1970s, WMAK was a top 40 contemporary hits radio station, popular with young people in Nashville. Promotion and stunts made the station competitive in the Nashville radio market. Before the switch to hit radio for WMAK, WKDA had been the dominant top 40 station in Nashville, helmed by Jack Stapp, a local music publisher and owner of TREE Music Publishing in Nashville. With the installation of Ralley Stanton as Program Director, WMAK began to rival WKDA.

Owner Fred Gregg, who also owned WAKY in Louisville, Kentucky, helped put WMAK into a competitive position by installing a new 5,000 watt RCA transmitter. With the new sound and complete coverage in the Middle Tennessee market, WMAK reached number two in the Pulse Rating Service and number three in the Monthly Hooper Ratings. WMAK disc jockeys were known as the "WMAK Tigers". They included: Allen (Dennis) and Alan (Nelson - the News Director) in morning drive time. Gene Clark was heard middays 9 AM-2 PM, Jay Reynolds (later at WABC New York) from 2PM to 6PM and Frank Jolley 6 PM-Midnight. Meanwhile, the DJs on WKDA 1240 were known as the "Good Guys".

WMAK would sign off each night at midnight until the late 60s, when Scott Shannon became Program Director and took the station full time. Shannon, later at WHTZ, WPLJ and WCBS-FM in New York, installed his new brand of top 40 radio excitement at the station. WMAK became the number one rated radio station under Shannon's leadership.

=== Disco, Oldies and Christian Radio ===
On August 14, 1978, the station adopted a disco music format and was known as "Majik 13". During the run of the disco format, WMAK was fully automated. On January 1, 1980, disco was dropped and WMAK's format became oldies. WMAK ended the automation and brought back live DJs. (The oldies format and call sign were later revived in 2000, by WMAK-FM 96.3, which is now Jack FM station WCJK).

In January of 1982, WMAK became the first Nashville station to offer morning-drive (6a - 10a) sports talk, with 19-year-old Nashville native Joe Williams behind the mic along with David Lipscomb College Sports Information Director Jonathan Seamon. The station focused on high school and college sports, along with local racing from Nashville International Raceway and NASCAR.

On June 22, 1982, 1300 AM became WLUY, "Lucky 13". Williams' show was moved to the 5 pm - 10 pm time slot when the station would sign off. Weekends were largely run by students of the Nashville Radio School. The station went dark in January 1984 following Williams' last show. That year, F. W. Robbert Broadcasting bought the station for $700,000. On February 2, 1984, it returned to the air and began broadcasting a Christian radio format.
