= WITA =

Knoxville, Tennessee; United States
- Branding: Inspiration 1490

Programming
- Format: Christian

Ownership
- Owner: F.W. Robbert Broadcasting; (WITA, Inc.)
- Sister stations: WLRM, WMQM, WNQM, WVOG, WWCR

History
- First air date: September 1960
- Former call signs: WROL (1960–1976); WKVQ (1976–1980)
- Call sign meaning: "With Inspiration to All"

Technical information
- Licensing authority: FCC
- Facility ID: 73076
- Class: C
- Power: 1,000 watts
- Transmitter coordinates: 35°58′11.3″N 83°57′55.7″W

Links
- Public license information: Public file; LMS
- Website: wita1490.com

WITA (1490 AM, "Inspiration 1490") is a Christian radio station located in Knoxville, Tennessee, United States, owned by F.W. Robbert Broadcasting Inc.

== History ==
WFCT, Inc., obtained a construction permit to build a new radio station in Fountain City on July 27, 1960. The station intended to use the WFCT call sign, but by the time the permit was issued, another station approved for Fountain City had claimed the letters. Instead, the station went on the air at the end of August or early September 1960 as WROL. This was a familiar call sign in Knoxville radio, as what was then WATE (620 AM) had been known as WROL from 1930 to 1956. WATE unsuccessfully protested. WROL was a 250-watt station until it upgraded its daytime power to 1,000 watts in 1964; at the same time, the city of license was changed from Fountain City to Knoxville in light of the former's annexation into the latter. In 1971, the station switched from a country music format to rock under the name "W-149", shunning its call letters and their country association.

In 1976, WROL was sold to Radio Knoxville, Inc., whose investors were based in Jackson, Tennessee. When the new ownership took over in March, WROL flipped to adult contemporary under new WKVQ call letters.

Forus Communications of Tennessee acquired WKVQ in 1980 and relaunched it that March 1 as the gospel-formatted WITA, "With Inspiration to All". Fred Westenberger acquired WITA from Forus in 1983.
