= Foolish Bailey =

American YouTuber

Bailey Freeman
- Born: Rome, Georgia
- Occupation: Sports media content creator

YouTube information
- Years active: 2012–present
- Genres: Sports and entertainment
- Subscribers: 365,000
- Views: 70 million
- Last updated: July 10, 2026
- Website: https://www.youtube.com/c/FoolishBailey

Bailey Freeman is a YouTuber and baseball media personality known for his Baseball Bits series and his YouTube channels Foolish Baseball and Foolish Bailey.

== Education ==
Freeman graduated from Furman University in 2017, studying German and history. During his college years, Freeman dabbled in standup comedy for the first time. Post-graduation, he took part in an exchange program in Hamburg, Germany, through the U.S. Department of State before returning home to Georgia. He worked at a homeless shelter for less than six months before his independent baseball media career took off.

== Career ==
The first baseball videos Freeman shared online via the Foolish Baseball channel were related to the simulation video game Out of the Park Baseball; they received little attention. In 2018, he began producing his flagship series, “Baseball Bits,” characterized by sprite artwork, humor, and plain-language explanations of sabermetrics and other advanced analytics.

Freeman's online breakout was a breakdown of a single inning pitched by Justin Verlander on May 24, 2012 against the Cleveland Indians, the eighth inning of an eventual 2-1 loss for Verlander’s Detroit Tigers in which Verlander threw several pitches over 100 mph as he put down the side in order. Verlander would tweet about the video in December 2018, catapulting attention paid to Freeman online and making it possible for YouTube creating to become Freeman’s full-time job.

He again gained notoriety by advocating for Larry Walker to be voted into the Baseball Hall of Fame, which Walker eventually was by a narrow margin of six votes in his final year of eligibility on the 2020 writers’ ballot.

As his online following grew, Freeman has since been featured on MLB Network, The Athletic, MASN, and in numerous collaborations with Jomboy Media.

In 2026, he reorganized his two YouTube channels. Foolish Bailey became his “main channel” with more routine uploads and Foolish Baseball was designated for unsponsored longer-form passion projects. With 365,000 subscribers on his Foolish Baseball channel and 115,000 on Foolish Bailey, as of July 2026, Freeman is among YouTube’s most popular baseball creators.

Fans support Freeman's work via by Patreon, which generates more than $3,000 per month as of August 2026.

== Personal life ==
Freeman is a fan of the Atlanta Braves, was born in Rome, Georgia, and continues to reside in Georgia, although he spent part of his youth in the Milwaukee area.

Freeman credits SpongeBob SquarePants, Red Letter Media, BalloonShop and Homestar Runner for crafting his sense of humor; Summoning Salt, CGP Grey and TheReportOfTheWeek for informing his YouTube sensibilities; and Moneyball, FanGraphs and Baseball Prospectus for developing his appreciation of analytics.
