= XEWG-AM =

Radio station in Ciudad Juárez, Chihuahua, Mexico

- Ciudad Juárez, Chihuahua; Mexico
- Broadcast area: El Paso–Juárez
- Frequency: 1240 AM
- Branding: Radio Crystal

Programming
- Format: Regional Mexican

Ownership
- Owner: Grupo Siete; (Emisiones Radiofónicas, S.A.)

History
- First air date: 1941

Technical information
- Licensing authority: CRT
- Class: C
- Power: 1,000 watts

Links
- Webcast: Listen live
- Website: radiocrystal.mx

XEWG-AM (1240) is a radio station in Ciudad Juárez, Chihuahua, Mexico. XEWG is known as Radio Crystal and is owned by Grupo Siete.

== History ==
The concession for XEWG was awarded to Carlos Méndez Jauregui in 1941 and then sold to Francisco Núñez Rivera in 1958 and Estela Vega Padilla in 1964. Vega Padilla was the housekeeper and friend of Richard Eaton, owner of the United Broadcasting Company in the United States, who had loaned her the money to run the station; when the two had a falling out over profits in Mexico, she fled in 1970 with a child entrusted to her care by Eaton. The station was then sold to a company called Escarga. In 1985, Radiodifusora Centauro del Norte bought the station; in turn, it was transferred to the current concessionaire in 2006.

In February 2020, XEWG added to its Bengala Regional Mexican format—the last Grupo Siete station using the name—by airing daytime Catholic religious programming branded as Radio Guadalupana, produced by the Roman Catholic Diocese of Ciudad Juárez, from 6 a.m. to 3 p.m. on weekdays and to 1:30 p.m. on weekends. This was later dropped as the station became known as Crystal 1240.

XEWG as Bengala
