= WJBE-FM =

- Five Points, Alabama; United States
- Broadcast area: Walker and Winston counties
- Frequency: 88.5 MHz
- Branding: "Country Legends 88.5 FM"

Programming
- Format: Classic country

Ownership
- Owner: Big South Community Broadcasting, Inc.
- Sister stations: WJLX

History
- First air date: April 18, 2008
- Former call signs: WJBE (2007–2013)
- Call sign meaning: Jacob Brett Elmore, the son of owner Brett Elmore, born a week before the station signed on

Technical information
- Licensing authority: FCC
- Facility ID: 172997
- Class: A
- ERP: 500 watts
- HAAT: 61 meters (200 ft)
- Transmitter coordinates: 33°57′51″N 87°12′34″W

Links
- Public license information: Public file; LMS
- Webcast: https://radio.securenetsystems.net/cirrusencore/index.cfm?stationCallSign=WJBEFM

WJBE-FM (88.5 FM) is an American radio station licensed to serve the community of Five Points, Alabama. The station's broadcast license is held by Big South Community Broadcasting, Inc. Launched in 2008 under the "WJBE" call sign, WJBE-FM serves Alabama's Walker and Winston Counties. This station is unrelated to the Knoxville-based WJBE (1430 AM) owned by entertainer James Brown from 1968 through 1979.

== History ==
=== Early days ===
This station received its original construction permit from the Federal Communications Commission on December 20, 2007. The new station was assigned the call letters WJBE by the FCC on December 27, 2007. WJBE received its license to cover from the FCC on June 5, 2008. The station changed its call sign to the current WJBE-FM on June 28, 2013.

=== On the air ===
WJBE originally broadcast a country music format branded as "Country Legends 88.5". Notable local programs included The Wal-Win Wake-up Show with Brett Elmore & Barry Patilla on weekday mornings and The Woody Wilson Show on weekday mid-days.

In addition to its music programming, the station broadcast local news and weather, regional sports, plus CNN Radio at the top of every hour. Each weekday morning, WJBE aired a tradio program called "Swap Shop". WJBE also aired select local high school football games and the college basketball games of both Bevill State Community College and Walker College. The station was also the home of the 2009 Alabama Broadcasters Association's Small Market Sportscaster of the Year, Brett Elmore.

The format later shifted to modern rock under the branding "88.5 The Planet" but with largely the same airstaff.

=== Falling silent ===
WJBE fell temporarily silent on January 10, 2014, for technical reasons. In their January 15, 2014, filing with the FCC, the station asserted "technical problems with the audio end of the transmitter" requiring that the transmitter be "sent back to the factory for repairs" and requested special temporary authority to remain silent until the transmitter can be repaired and reinstalled. WJBE is still listed with the FCC as "silent" (out of business) on the FCC listing of defunct FM broadcast stations.

Sometime in late 2013 or early 2014, the station had returned to the "Country Legends 88.5" oprogramming. As of September 22, 2014, WJBE-FM returned to the air.
