= WWCR =

Shortwave Christian radio station in Nashville, Tennessee, United States

Coordinates: 36°12′30″N 86°53′38″W

- Nashville, Tennessee; United States
- Broadcast area: Worldwide
- Frequency: Shortwave: Various
- Branding: World Wide Christian Radio

Programming
- Format: Christian radio; brokered programming
- Affiliations: Genesis Communications Network

Ownership
- Owner: F.W. Robbert Broadcasting

History
- First air date: June 1989; 37 years ago
- Call sign meaning: "World Wide Christian Radio"

Technical information
- Power: 100,000 watts

Links
- Website: www.wwcr.com

WWCR is a shortwave radio station located in Nashville, Tennessee, in the United States. WWCR uses four 100 kW transmitters to broadcast on about a dozen frequencies.

WWCR mainly leases out its four transmitters to religious organizations and speakers. It served as the shortwave home of Genesis Communications Network's programs. However, it does air a few hours of original programming per week.

F.W. Robbert Broadcasting also owns the AM (mediumwave) stations WNQM in Nashville, WMQM and WLRM in Memphis, WITA in Knoxville, and WVOG in New Orleans. Some of WWCR's programming is also broadcast on these local stations.

== History ==
Originally known as "World Wide Country Radio", WWCR began broadcasting a country format but quickly switched to a standard evangelical Christian format, also selling leased airtime. Because of the station's policy of leasing airtime, and loose standards, WWCR acquired an early reputation for carrying an eclectic mix of political and entertainment programming in addition to the religious programs. WWCR continues to carry a daily hour of country music as a callback to its original format. The majority of the political commentary on the station is of a conservative or ultra-conservative nature with extensive discussion on conspiracy theories.

A December 1997 broadcast by Ted Gunderson over WWCR later became the subject of a court case. In that case, lawyers for Art Bell claimed that the broadcast had implied he had been charged with child molestation. A defamation lawsuit against the station was settled in October 2000 and Art Bell claimed that WWCR had apologized for the incident. Ted Gunderson disputes that any apology was ever made and asserts that the case was entirely baseless.

== Transmitters ==
All four WWCR transmitters operate 24/7, shifting frequencies throughout the day, each with 100 kilowatts of broadcast power. All frequencies in megahertz, directions in (parentheses).

WWCR-1 (46° NE)
Off air
WWCR-2 (85° E)
12.160 day, 7.49 morning, 9.35 evening, 5.935 night
WWCR-3 (40° NE)
13.845 day, 4.84 night
WWCR-4 (90° E)
7.52 evening, 5.89 night (weekdays only)

7.49 is shared with WBCQ, which holds rights to the frequency from noon to midnight.

== Programming ==
The University Network run by the estate of Gene Scott operates a 16-hour daily schedule split across transmitters 2 and 3. Transmitter 4 is mostly off-air since the withdrawal of the Overcomer Ministry's funding. The remainder of WWCR's schedule is devoted mostly to religious brokered programming. A limited amount of political talk remains on the channel, less so since Genesis Communications Network dropped its programming from WWCR ahead of its May 2024 shutdown; remaining hosts of secular programs include Hal Turner, John Jurasek and Pat Boone.

== See also ==
- Shortwave listening
