= WVOG =

Gospel radio station in New Orleans

Coordinates: 29°57′25″N 90°09′33″W

- New Orleans, Louisiana; United States
- Frequency: 600 kHz
- Branding: Gospel 600

Programming
- Format: Christian radio; southern gospel

Ownership
- Owner: F.W. Robbert Broadcasting Co., Inc.
- Sister stations: WITA; WLRM; WMQM; WNQM; WWCR

History
- First air date: 1950 (as WMRY)
- Former call signs: WMRY (1950–1958); WYLD (1958); WWOM (1958–1974)
- Call sign meaning: "Voice of God"

Technical information
- Licensing authority: FCC
- Class: D
- Power: 1000 watts day; 31 watts night
- Translator: 107.9 W300DP (New Orleans)

Links
- Public license information: Public file; LMS
- Website: www.600wvog.com

WVOG (600 kHz, "Gospel 600") is an AM radio station in New Orleans, Louisiana. The station, whose call sign stands for "The Voice of God", is owned by F.W. Robbert Broadcasting Co., Inc. and operates at with 1,000 watts by day and 31 watts night. The format is Christian radio with preaching and instruction shows plus southern gospel music.

WVOG's studios are located on Loumor Avenue in Metairie, Louisiana. The transmitter is off River Road, also in Metairie.

== History ==
The first New Orleans station at AM 600 signed on in 1950 as WMRY. It was originally a daytimer, broadcasting at 500 watts during the day and required to sign-off at night to avoid interfering with other stations on the same frequency. WMRY was programmed to the African American community. An advertisement in the 1951 Broadcasting Yearbook, using the vocabulary of that era, said that a half million "colored people" lived in the WMRY coverage area and that WMRY was "programmed for Negroes by Negroes".

In 1958, WMRY's programming moved over to AM 940 under a new call sign, WYLD. After the move, a new station was launched on the AM 600 frequency by Dave Waagenvord as WWOM ("Wonderful World of Music"). It carried a beautiful music format of mostly instrumental versions of pop songs and music from Broadway and Hollywood. In 1965, Waagenvord launched WWOM-FM 98.5 (now WYLD-FM), and in 1967, he added a TV station, WWOM-TV channel 26 (now WGNO).

In the 1970s, the station's power increased to 1,000 watts, but it still was not authorized to broadcast at night. In 1974, the station was bought by F. W. Robbert, the current owner. He switched to a Christian radio format as WVOG. In the early 2010s, the station received authorization to broadcast at night, although with the low power of 31 watts.
