= WJBE (AM) =

- Powell, Tennessee; United States
- Broadcast area: Knoxville metro
- Frequency: 1040 kHz
- Branding: Jammin' 99.7

Programming
- Format: Urban contemporary
- Affiliations: Premiere Networks

Ownership
- Owner: Joseph Armstrong; (Arm & Rage, LLC)

History
- First air date: August 1984
- Former call signs: WKXT (CP, 1984); WBZW (1984–1988); WQBB (1988–2008); WKTI (2008–2012); WWAM (2012–2013)
- Call sign meaning: Tribute to the former WJBE (1430 AM), owned by James Brown

Technical information
- Licensing authority: FCC
- Facility ID: 59643
- Class: D
- Power: 10,000 watts day 3,000 watts critical hours
- Transmitter coordinates: 36°2′34″N 84°2′51″W
- Translator: 99.7 W259AV (Knoxville)

Links
- Public license information: Public file; LMS
- Webcast: Listen live
- Website: wjbe.org

WJBE (1040 kHz) is an American commercial radio station licensed to Powell, Tennessee, an unincorporated community just northeast of Knoxville; the station serves the Knoxville metropolitan area with an urban contemporary format. WJBE is owned by Joe E. Armstrong through broadcast licensee Arm & Rage, LLC. This station is unrelated to the former locally based WJBE (1430 AM) owned by entertainer James Brown from 1968 through 1979, for which it is named.

WJBE operates on the clear-channel frequency of 1040 AM, but is not considered a clear-channel station because it is a Class D daytime-only station. WHO in Des Moines, Iowa, is the dominant Class A station, also known as a clear-channel station.

1040 AM in the Knoxville area began broadcasting in 1984 and primarily aired an adult standards format for its first 25 years. The station then aired classic country music in the late 2000s and early 2010s before being sold to its present ownership in 2013 and being reoriented toward the Black community in Knoxville.

== History ==
WBZW went on the air in August 1984 as a station with a satellite-fed adult standards format. Founding owner Dick Huckaba sold WBZW in 1986 to Holder Communications but remained president and general manager.

When it was sold again to Knoxville-based Southern Diversified Industries in 1988, the new owners changed the call sign to WQBB, for "We're Quality Big Band". Southern had acquired the station as a spinoff when Holder was purchased and the new owners opted not to keep its only AM outlet. In 1989, the station adopted AM stereo and increased power to 10,000 watts. From 1993, it was simulcast on WQBB-FM 104.5.

Journal Communications acquired the WQBB stations in 1998, doubling its holdings from two stations to four in the Knoxville area. Journal split the FM station off and flipped it to country. In 2002, after WTXM-AM-FM "The Team" dropped its sports format, WQBB flipped to sports talk and picked up many of the same Fox Sports Radio hosts that had been heard on that station.

After one last flip back to standards, in November 2008, the station became a classic country outlet under the call sign WKTI. The new call letters had little to do with Knoxville and much to do with Journal's headquarters of Milwaukee; that same month, the station there known as WKTI for 34 years changed its call sign to WLWK-FM in a format flip, and moving the designation to Knoxville allowed Journal to prevent any Milwaukee-area competitor from using it.

On December 3, 2012, the station was sold by Journal to WMCH Radio, Inc., in order to meet regulatory requirements after purchasing WACY-TV in Appleton, Wisconsin. Journal retained the WKTI call letters (moving them to a low-power TV station in Sturgeon Bay, Wisconsin), and the call sign of the radio station was changed to WWAM. WWAM changed to urban adult contemporary with the sale.

Effective May 7, 2013, WWAM was sold to Arm & Rage, LLC, a company owned by former Tennessee state representative Joe E. Armstrong, at a purchase price of $75,532.50. The station changed its call sign to the current WJBE on June 28, 2013, and added the FM translator to begin nighttime service. Armstrong had worked in sales at the original WJBE, which was owned by James Brown, in the 1970s; he sought to restore a Black radio station to the community. On February 3, 2016, WJBE changed its format to urban contemporary, branded as "Jammin' 99.7".

On March 21, 2022, the FCC designated the license for hearing and proposed its revocation as a result of Armstrong's 2016 felony conviction on a charge of filing false federal income tax statements. The case dealt with a scheme to profit off an increase in cigarette taxes in Tennessee by buying tax stamps and reselling them after the taxes increased. FCC administrative law judge Jane Hinckley Halprin issued an initial decision in September 2023, finding that the FCC's Enforcement Bureau had failed to justify revocation for a series of rule violations and that Armstrong had been rehabilitated by the Knoxville community.

== FM translator ==
In addition to the main station at 1040 AM, WJBE is relayed by an FM translator; this gives the listener the ability to listen on FM. As WJBE AM is a daytime-only station, the FM signal gives the station the ability to broadcast 24 hours a day because FM stations are not restricted to daytime hours only.

Broadcast translator for WJBE
Call sign	Frequency	City of license	FID	ERP (W)	HAAT	Class	FCC info
W259AV	99.7 FM	Knoxville, Tennessee	156669	99	154.8 m (508 ft)	D	LMS
