= WBEJ =

Radio station in Elizabethton, Tennessee

- Elizabethton, Tennessee; United States
- Broadcast area: Johnson City-Kingsport-Bristol
- Frequency: 1240 kHz
- Branding: 107.9 The Bridge

Programming
- Format: Southern gospel

Ownership
- Owner: Kenneth C. Hill

History
- First air date: July 1946
- Call sign meaning: Bristol, Elizabethton, Johnson City

Technical information
- Licensing authority: FCC
- Facility ID: 9431
- Class: C
- Power: 1,000 watts unlimited
- Transmitter coordinates: 36°20′7.00″N 82°13′3.00″W
- Translator: 107.9 W300CC (Elizabethton)

Links
- Public license information: Public file; LMS
- Webcast: Listen live
- Website: 1079thebridge.com

WBEJ (1240 AM) is a radio station licensed to Elizabethton, Tennessee, United States, the station serves the Johnson City-Kingsport-Bristol area. The station is currently owned by Kenneth C. Hill.

On June 1, 2024, WBEJ changed their format from country to southern gospel, branded as "107.9 The Bridge" (simulcast on FM translator W300CC 107.9 FM Elizabethton).
