= WMGJ =

- Gadsden, Alabama; United States
- Broadcast area: Etowah County, Alabama
- Frequency: 1240 kHz
- Branding: Magic 1240 AM

Programming
- Format: Urban Contemporary

Ownership
- Owner: Floyd L. Donald Broadcasting Co., Inc.

History
- First air date: September 12, 1985
- Call sign meaning: "Magic"

Technical information
- Licensing authority: FCC
- Facility ID: 21817
- Class: C
- Power: 1,000 watts
- Transmitter coordinates: 34°00′04″N 86°01′48″W

Links
- Public license information: Public file; LMS
- Website: wmgjam.com

WMGJ (1240 AM, "Magic 1240 AM") is a radio station licensed to serve Gadsden, Alabama, United States. The station is owned by Floyd L. Donald Broadcasting Co., Inc. Operations Manager is David Lawson.

== Programming ==
WMGJ broadcasts a community-oriented urban contemporary music format to the Etowah County, Alabama, area. The station describes its program offerings as a blend of a local talk radio, gospel, rhythm and blues, urban contemporary chart toppers, news, and local sports coverage. Notable local weekday air talent includes Brian Isom Underwood, Floyd L. Donald, Marinda Davis-Reaves, and Bill Morrow.

== History ==
This station received its original construction permit from the Federal Communications Commission on September 10, 1984. The new station was assigned the call letters WMGJ by the FCC on September 25, 1984. WMGJ received its license to cover from the FCC on March 21, 1986.
