= WWNS =

- Statesboro, Georgia; United States
- Frequency: 1240 kHz
- Branding: Fox News 107.7

Programming
- Format: Conservative talk
- Affiliations: Westwood One

Ownership
- Owner: Bryan Steele; (Foundry Broadcasting)
- Sister stations: WPTB 850/99.7, WPMX 94.9, WMCD 106.5

History
- First air date: 1946
- Call sign meaning: Welcome Where Nature Smiles

Technical information
- Licensing authority: FCC
- Facility ID: 54804
- Class: C
- Power: 710 watts unlimited
- Transmitter coordinates: 32°27′19.00″N 81°46′28.00″W
- Translator: 107.7 W299CT (Statesboro)

Links
- Public license information: Public file; LMS

WWNS (1240 AM) is a radio station broadcasting a conservative talk radio format. Licensed to Statesboro, Georgia, United States, the station is currently owned by Bryan Steele, through licensee Foundry Broadcasting. It features programming from Westwood One.

== History ==
On January 5, 1946, local businessman and the city's mayor, Alfred Dorman, made application to the FCC for Statesboro's first radio station. A construction permit for 250 watts full-time at 1490 on the dial was granted on April 3, 1946.

Dorman's son-in-law, Paul Sauve, was in charge of getting the station constructed, and to be its manager once on the air. The call letters, WWNS, were selected to reflect the city's motto, "Where Nature Smiles".

On November 25, 1946, WWNS was granted conditional authority to begin program tests, which it did on Sunday afternoon, December 1. The permanent station license was granted on January 28, 1947. In addition to significant locally originated programming, WWNS also carried programming from the Mutual Broadcasting System

According to all reports, the new station was well received in the community and surrounding area.

Not feeling that broadcasting was his life's calling, Sauve urged his father-in-law to sell the station. On May 1, 1950, operation of the station was assumed by Robert H. Thompson and Virginia P. Bowen, d/b/a Statesboro Broadcasting System. "Uncle Bobby", as he became known, moved from to Statesboro from Cordele, where he'd been associated with the Cordele Dispatch, which had ties to Cordele radio station WMJM. WMJM was owned by the Rivers family, which had several radio stations and newspapers in the southeast. Virginia Bowen lived in Glynn County. Her husband had been associated with former Governor E.D. Rivers.

Thompson and Bowen later dissolved their partnership, and on February 25, 1954, Thompson became the sole owner of WWNS.

On May 25, 1955, Thompson was granted permission to relocate WWNS to 1240 on the dial. The no longer used 1490 was moved to Sylvania, in order to establish WSYL there in December, 1955.

Desiring to retire from the radio business, Thompson sold the Statesboro station to WWNS, Inc., owned by native brothers Don, Worth and Horace McDougald. The McDougalds assumed operation of the station on July 1, 1958. Their late father, Walter McDougald, had created the "Where Nature Smiles" slogan for the city in 1937.

Eventually, Don McDougald became sole owner of WWNS, adding FM station WMCD in 1967. McDougald was also heavily involved in bringing cable television to Statesboro in the late 60s. Under McDougald's leadership, the radio stations were tireless servants to the community.

With the pending debut of a new, competing radio station (WPTB debuted on April 5, 1976), McDougald felt it to be a good time to sell his radio stations. On March 1, 1975, Radio Statesboro, Inc., an entity owned by Georgia broadcasters Billy Woodall and Cecil Grider (who were also brothers-in-law), assumed operation of the stations.

5 years to the day later, Radio Statesboro was sold to equally to Nate Hirsch (longtime staff member) and Dell Pressey. Following Pressey's death, Hirsch became sole owner in July, 1986.

Hirsch sold the stations to Communications Capital Managers in 2001, who sold to Georgia Eagle Radio in 2007, who sold to Radio Statesboro in 2014, who sold to Foundry Broadcasting in 2019.
