= WZTQ =

- Centre, Alabama; United States
- Frequency: 1560 kHz
- Branding: Joy Christian Radio

Programming
- Format: Southern gospel

Ownership
- Owner: Joy Christian Communications, Inc.

History
- First air date: November 9, 1962
- Last air date: May 10, 2016
- Former call signs: WAGC (1962–2003); WZTQ (2003–2007); WLYJ (2007–2012); WZTQ (2012–2013); WLYG (2013–2014)

Technical information
- Facility ID: 54521
- Class: D
- Power: 1,000 watts (day only)
- Transmitter coordinates: 34°7′41″N 85°38′27″W

WZTQ (1560 AM, "Joy Christian Radio") was a radio station licensed to serve Centre, Alabama. The station was owned by Joy Christian Communications, Inc. It aired a southern gospel music format.

== History ==
This station signed on as WAGC, a 1,000 watt daytime-only AM station broadcasting at 1560 kHz under the ownership of Radio Centre, Inc. The station signed on with a country & western music format which it maintained throughout the remainder of the 1960s and all of the 1970s.

In August 2003, Radio Centre, Inc., reached an agreement to sell WAGC to Joy Christian Communications, Inc. As part of the deal, they had the Federal Communications Commission (FCC) change the station's call sign to WZTQ on September 12, 2003. The sale was approved by the FCC on November 24, 2003, and the transaction was consummated on December 1, 2003.

This station was assigned the WLYJ call letters by the FCC on September 17, 2007, when it swapped with then-sister station WZTQ. It took on the WZTQ call letters again on February 23, 2012. On May 16, 2013, the station changed to the WLYG call sign, and back again to WZTQ on October 13, 2014. WZTQ's license was surrendered to the FCC by Joy Christian Communications on May 10, 2016, and cancelled by the FCC on June 28, 2016.
