= WALO =

Radio station licensed to Humacao, Puerto Rico

- Humacao, Puerto Rico; Puerto Rico
- Frequency: 1240 kHz
- Branding: Radio Oriental

Programming
- Format: Spanish variety format
- Affiliations: Radio Isla

Ownership
- Owner: Radio Oriental, Inc.; (Ochoa Broadcasting Corp.)

History
- First air date: February 11, 1958
- Call sign meaning: W Antonio Luis Ochoa

Technical information
- Licensing authority: FCC
- Facility ID: 50011
- Class: C
- Power: 1,000 watts unlimited
- Transmitter coordinates: 18°8′49.00″N 65°48′49.00″W
- Translator: 105.1 W286DH (Gurabo)

Links
- Public license information: Public file; LMS
- Webcast: Listen Live
- Website: waloradio.com

WALO (1240 AM) is a radio station broadcasting a Spanish variety format. Licensed to Humacao, Puerto Rico. The station is currently owned by Ochoa Broadcasting Corp. of the Archilla Munoz family and features programming from Radio Isla.

== Translator stations ==
Broadcast translator for WALO
Call sign	Frequency	City of license	FID	ERP (W)	FCC info
W286DH	105.1 FM	Gurabo, Puerto Rico	201494	250	LMS
