= KTAM =

Coordinates: 30°39′1.7″N 96°20′58.2″W

- Bryan, Texas; United States
- Broadcast area: Brazos Valley
- Frequency: 1240 kHz
- Branding: Radio Alegria

Programming
- Format: Regional Mexican

Ownership
- Owner: Brazos Valley Communications, LLC

History
- First air date: September 10, 1947 (78 years ago)
- Former call signs: KORA (1947–1973)
- Call sign meaning: K Texas A&M

Technical information
- Licensing authority: FCC
- Facility ID: 62002
- Class: C
- Power: 380 watts unlimited
- Translator: 100.1 K261EY (Bryan)

Links
- Public license information: Public file; LMS
- Website: radioalegria1240.com

KTAM (1240 AM) is an American radio station licensed to Bryan, Texas. The station airs a Regional Mexican music format, branded as "Radio Alegria". KTAM is owned and operated by Brazos Valley Communications, LLC. Brazos Valley Communications acquired the station in August 2006 from Equicom.

== History ==
KTAM was initially proposed by David C. Jones Jr. in June 1947, as a 250 watt fulltime broadcast facility, under the licensee name of Bryan Broadcasting Company. The facility was assigned the callsign KORA by request, as it was the first name of Jones's mother, and went on the air on September 10, 1947.

KORA aired a Country and Western format for many years. On May 31, 1966, KORA-FM was signed on as the sister station to KORA, which continues to program the heritage Country format as the continuation to this facility. The callsign was changed to the current KTAM in 1973 and the station adopted a contemporary format.

KTAM moved to an oldies format in the 80s, and then standards in 1994. KTAM began airing Spanish language programming after competitor 99.5 KBMA "La Fabulosa" was sold to Clear Channel Communications in 2001, changed format to Classic Rock, and became KNFX-FM. Some of the former KBMA staff were hired by KTAM.
