= TheReportOfTheWeek =

American Internet personality (born 1997 or 1998)

- Born: John Jurasek; 1997 or 1998 (age 28–29)
- Other name: Reviewbrah

YouTube information
- Channel: TheReportOfTheWeek
- Years active: 2011–present
- Genre: Food criticism
- Subscribers: 2.98 million
- Views: 361 million
- Last updated: 25 October 2026

John Jurasek (born 1997 or 1998), better known online as TheReportOfTheWeek or Reviewbrah, is an American YouTube personality, food critic and radio host. Jurasek reviews fast food, frozen meals, and energy drinks on his YouTube channel of the same name, and hosts a radio show on shortwave radio, Spotify, TuneIn, and SoundCloud.

== Early life ==
Jurasek is originally from southern New York State. He attended St. Thomas Aquinas College in Sparkill, New York, as a communications student before moving to central Florida.

== Career ==
=== YouTube videos ===
Establishing his YouTube channel in 2011, Jurasek's initial focus was on a series of energy drink reviews known as Energy Crisis. He has since diversified to include a food review series, Running on Empty, which focuses on fast food and frozen ready-made meals. A third unnamed series focuses on reviewing specialty drinks. As of February 2026, Jurasek's YouTube channel, TheReportOfTheWeek, had over 2.95 million subscribers and more than 346 million views.

Regarding the type of food items featured in his reviews, he has stated: "Is every average American going to be eating a steak dinner every night? No. Fast food, though, well, there's usually a McDonald's every half-mile ... I want to be applicable to the largest number of people."

Jurasek's trademarks are speaking in what New York magazine calls an "old-time radio" voice and appearing in vintage suits, which he wears as his everyday clothing.

=== Radio work ===
Jurasek hosts a weekly shortwave radio program, VORW Radio International, which features commentary and listener-requested music. The program has been transmitted primarily by WBCQ, WWCR, and WRMI. In early 2022, VORW Radio International expanded with a weekly radio airing for shortwave listeners in Europe.

As of February 2019, Jurasek also began uploading regular podcasts, recorded shortwave shows, and live streams to YouTube via his channel VORW Podcast, which had accumulated over 103,000 subscribers and 3,1 million views as of September 27, 2026.

== Internet hoax ==
In May 2017, Jurasek was the subject of an internet hoax when a viral image wrongly depicted him among the suspected casualties of the Manchester Arena bombing in England.
