= KANE (AM) =

- New Iberia, Louisiana; United States
- Broadcast area: Lafayette, Louisiana
- Frequency: 1240 kHz
- Branding: (Kane) Radio AM 1240

Programming
- Format: Full service oldies
- Affiliations: Westwood One

Ownership
- Owner: Coastal Broadcasting of Lafourche, L.L.C.

History
- First air date: August 1946
- Call sign meaning: SugarKANE

Technical information
- Licensing authority: FCC
- Facility ID: 48452
- Class: C
- Power: 1,000 watts unlimited
- Transmitter coordinates: 30°1′3″N 91°50′10″W
- Translator: 107.5 K298CQ (New Iberia)

Links
- Public license information: Public file; LMS

KANE (1240 AM) is an American radio station broadcasting an oldies music format. Licensed to New Iberia, Louisiana, United States, the station serves the Lafayette area. The station is currently owned by Coastal Broadcasting of Lafourche, L.L.C. and features programming from Westwood One.

== History ==
A partnership of George H. Thomas, James J. Davidson Jr., and Daniel H. Castille, the New Iberia Broadcasting Company, received a construction permit from the Federal Communications Commission for a new 250-watt, unlimited-time radio station to serve New Iberia on January 9, 1946. The new station permit selected the call letters KNEI before changing to KANE on May 16 of that year. From studios on St. Peter Street, signed on in August and joined the Mutual Broadcasting System on December 15. In the early years of the station, there were several changes of ownership in the New Iberia Broadcasting Company. Dierrell Hamm became a partner in 1952; he sold his stake to Don Bonin in 1957. The station also changed network affiliations from Mutual to ABC in 1952, airing both networks' output for seven months. Ten years later, KANE was approved to increase its power to 1,000 watts during daylight hours.

KANE news reports were scrutinized after an August 1969 clash between five White and 35 Black students. The station reported that the principal of New Iberia Senior High School, at the time in the process of desegregation, and two White students had been injured and hospitalized when, in fact, the principal was unhurt. However, based on KANE's erroneous reporting, many parents pulled their children from school, and police tear gassed the Black youths.

In 1977, original owners Thomas and Davidson sold KANE after more than 30 years to a group headed by general manager Arthur Suberbielle for $629,000. Suberbielle, a New Iberia native, invested in AM stereo for KANE, converting in 1983, In addition to KANE, Suberbielle also owned an outdoor advertising company and published Acadiana Lifestyle magazine.

Former logo

Michael F. Starr purchased KANE in 2001 for $430,000. Starr sold 49 percent of KANE to Jerry Gisclair, forming Coastal Broadcasting, later that year.
