= KOFE =

- St. Maries, Idaho; United States
- Frequency: 1240 kHz
- Branding: AM 1240 KOFE

Programming
- Format: Classic hits
- Affiliations: ABC Radio

Ownership
- Owner: Theresa Plank

History
- First air date: 1970

Technical information
- Licensing authority: FCC
- Facility ID: 65263
- Class: C
- Power: 1,000 watts day 500 watts night
- Transmitter coordinates: 47°19′14″N 116°32′50″W

Links
- Public license information: Public file; LMS

KOFE (1240 AM) is a radio station broadcasting a classic hits format. Licensed to St. Maries, Idaho, United States, the station is currently owned by Theresa Plank, and features programming from ABC Radio.
