= KRDM =

Radio station in Redmond, Oregon

- Redmond, Oregon; United States
- Broadcast area: Bend, Oregon
- Frequency: 1240 (kHz)
- Branding: La Bronca

Programming
- Format: Regional Mexican

Ownership
- Owner: Red Mountain Broadcasting

Technical information
- Licensing authority: FCC
- Facility ID: 129314
- Class: C
- Power: 1,000 watts
- Transmitter coordinates: 44°16′41″N 121°8′44″W

Links
- Public license information: Public file; LMS
- Website: radiolabronca.com

KRDM (1240 AM, "La Bronca") is a commercial regional Mexican radio station in Bend, Oregon. The station first went on air in 2004 broadcasting a news/talk format. Legendary Central Oregon radio host Bobby Smith was the only live and local air talent on the station. He hosted KRDM'S "Tradio on the Radio" weekday mornings. The station also featured Don Imus, Laura Ingraham, Sean Hannity, John Batchelor, Glenn Beck, Ed Schultz, and others. The Station was originally owned by Sage Communications. A petition to revert programming to the original News/Talk format is currently in the works.
