= WBGC =

- Chipley, Florida; United States
- Frequency: 1240 kHz
- Branding: EZ Choice

Programming
- Format: Variety

Ownership
- Owner: Jacquelyn Collier Pembroke

Technical information
- Facility ID: 27538
- Class: C
- Power: 1,000 watts unlimited
- Transmitter coordinates: 30°46′19.00″N 85°33′31.00″W

WBGC (1240 AM) is a radio station broadcasting a Variety format. Licensed to Chipley, Florida, United States. The station is currently owned by Jacquelyn Collier Pembroke.

The station began broadcasting in 1956. Its call letters reflected its local market: Bonifay, Graceville & Chipley.
