= WKDK =

- Newberry, South Carolina; United States
- Frequency: 1240 kHz

Programming
- Format: Oldies
- Affiliations: Fox News Radio; Premiere Networks

Ownership
- Owner: Newberry Broadcasting Company, Inc.

History
- First air date: October 26, 1946

Technical information
- Licensing authority: FCC
- Facility ID: 48706
- Class: C
- Power: 1,000 watts
- Transmitter coordinates: 34°17′30″N 81°37′15″W
- Translator: 101.7 W269DW (Newberry)

Links
- Public license information: Public file; LMS
- Webcast: Listen live
- Website: wkdk.com

WKDK (1240 kHz) is a commercial AM radio station in Newberry, South Carolina. It has an oldies radio format and is owned by Newberry Broadcasting Company, Inc. The studios and offices are at 3000 Hazel Street.

WKDK transmits 1,000 watts, using a non-directional antenna. Programming is also heard on 250-watt FM translator W269DW at 101.7 MHz in Newberry.

== Programming ==
WKDK's playlist includes hits from the 1960s, 70s, and 80s. Weekdays at 9 am, it features The Coffee Hour, with local community groups speaking about their activities.

WKDK carries live games from Newberry County high school sports and the Newberry College Wolves sports teams. It also features programming from Premiere Networks, with updates from Fox News Radio.

== History ==
The station signed on the air on October 26, 1946. The station power was 250 watts, and it had studios at its transmitter site, 11 Radio Drive. It was owned by the Newberry Broadcasting Company with C. H. Kaufmann as the president and general manager. It was a network affiliate of the Mutual Broadcasting System, carrying its dramas, comedies, news and sports during the "Golden Age of Radio."

In the 1960s and 70s, WKDK was playing Top 40 music. Its power was 1,000 watts by day and 250 watts at night. In the 1990s, as listening to contemporary music shifted from AM radio to the FM band, WKDK switched to an oldies format.
