= WLRM =

- Millington, Tennessee; United States
- Broadcast area: Memphis, Tennessee
- Frequency: 1380 kHz
- Branding: AM 1380 WLRM

Programming
- Format: Blues

Ownership
- Owner: F.W. Robbert Broadcasting; (CPT & T Radio Station, Inc.)
- Sister stations: WITA, WMQM, WNQM, WVOG, WWCR

History
- First air date: June 22, 1962
- Former call signs: WGMM (1962–1969); WTNN (1969–1983); WMPS (1983–1998); WOOM (1998–2002)
- Call sign meaning: We Love Real Music (current format)

Technical information
- Licensing authority: FCC
- Facility ID: 15670
- Class: B
- Power: 2,500 watts (day); 1,000 watts (night)
- Transmitter coordinates: 35°18′56″N 89°55′23″W
- Translator: (106.9 MHz) W295DH (Millington)

Links
- Public license information: Public file; LMS

WLRM (1380 AM) is an American radio station licensed to serve the community of Millington, Tennessee, United States. The station was established in 1962 as "WGMM", originally licensed only for limited daytime-only operation. Upgraded to 24-hours operation in 1984, the station has broadcast a variety of formats over the past 50 years, including country and Gospel music.

WLRM is currently owned by F. W. Robbert Broadcasting and the broadcast license is held by CPT & T Radio Station, Inc.

WLRM broadcasts a Blues and Southern Soul format Monday through Saturday, and Gospel music on Sundays.

It is the flagship station of The Political Cesspool, a weekly far-right talk radio show founded by Tennessean political activist James Edwards on the sister station WMQM 2004 and shifting to WLRM an year later, which is broadcast on Saturday nights. It also simulcasts on the neo-Nazi Stormfront Radio.

== History ==
=== 1960s ===
This station began licensed broadcast operations on June 22, 1962, as "WGMM". Restricted to operating as a daytime-only radio station and broadcasting at 1380 kilohertz with 500 watts of power, WGMM was originally owned and operated by Radio Millington, Inc. Al McClain served as general manager, commercial manager, and program director with Web Anderson as promotions manager, Bob Trantham as news director, Emmett Kozel as chief engineer, and Mary Nell Thomas as traffic manager. By 1965, Bill Thomas was brought in to be the program director and Emmett Kozel added news director duties to his engineering role.

A shift in personnel in 1965 saw Joe C. Matthews take over as president and general manager with Bill Thomas elevated to station manager. Lee Cash was named as program director and Ed Freeman became WGMM's chief engineer. The station also added five hours of "specialty" programming featuring country & western music. By 1968, the station was playing a 100% country & western format. At the same time, Chad Lassiter took over the general manager role and R. L. Merry became the program director. As the decade came to a close, William M. Brown became WGMM's general manager, program director, and news director with Sidney Williams as chief engineer.

=== 1970s ===
Shelby Broadcasting Company, owned by Gary Acker, acquired the station in May 1969 and had the station's call sign changed to "WTNN". With Gary Acker as president of the company, Franklin Davis was named general manager, commercial manager, and promotions manager. Rick Stafford was hired as news director and Sidney Williams stayed on as chief engineer. By 1973, Charlie C. Freeman became both program director and promotions manager with Terry Rutherford taking over as chief engineer. The station maintained its country format.

On August 27, 1973, the broadcast license for WTNN was transferred to The Moore Company with Gary Acker remaining as company president. This shift marked a format flip to Gospel music with Steve L. Williams becoming general manager, commercial manager, promotions manager, and news director for the station. Rick Smith was named program director and Dave Church became the chief engineer. This lineup of key personnel and the Gospel format remained steady through the end of the 1970s.

=== 1980s ===
In March 1982, the station then licensed as "WTNN" was sold by The Moore Company, Inc., to L&M Media, Inc. The Federal Communications Commission (FCC) accepted the filing on April 2, 1982, and approved the deal on June 2, 1982. Charles Trub served in dual roles as president and general manager with Penny Peck as operations director and Dave Church stayed on as chief engineer. The format was flipped back to country music.

In November 1982, the new owners applied for a construction permit to shift from daytimer to 24-hour operation with 2,500 watts of signal power during the day and 1,000 watts at night from a modified antenna system. The Commission granted the permit on June 21, 1983. Along with this, they requested a new call sign for the station and were assigned "WMPS" on July 18, 1983, and Doug Foster Jr was named Operations Director. After nearly four months of testing, WMPS began licensed 24-hour operations on February 29, 1984.

L&M Media, Inc., applied to the FCC to transfer WMPS to the U.S. Radio Corporation in November 1986. The Commission approved the deal on December 19, 1986, and the transaction was formally consummated on January 21, 1987. WMPS was flipped to a talk radio format. Facing financial difficulties, the WMPS license was involuntarily transferred from U.S. Radio Corporation to trustee Von A. Harshman in September 1988. The FCC was informed on September 27, 1988, and the Commission approved the transfer on October 3, 1988. In August 1989, trustee Harshman applied to transfer the station to Good News Broadcasting Company, a religious outfit. The FCC approved the sale on October 31, 1989, and the deal was formally consummated on January 25, 1990.

=== 1990s ===
This ownership proved short-lived as Good News Broadcasting Company filed an application in August 1990 to transfer WMPS to David Grayson Life Changing Ministries, Inc., for a reported sale price of $295,000. The FCC approved the deal on October 9, 1990, and the transaction was formally consummated on October 25, 1990. The new owners shifted the format to Contemporary Christian music. David Grayson Life Changing Ministries tried to transfer the license to Abundant Grace Fellowship, Inc., in January 1993 but the deal collapsed and was formally ended in April 1993.

Another attempt to sell WMPS, this time to World Overcomers Outreach Ministries Church, Inc., was filed in January 1998. The reported sale price was $275,000 in cash. The FCC approved the sale on March 3, 1998, and the transaction was formally consummated on March 23, 1998. The new owners had the FCC change the station's call sign to "WOOM" on April 6, 1998, to reflect its ownership. WOOM broadcast a Christian music format. Later, another application was filed and the station was assigned the "WLRM" call sign by the FCC on October 25, 2002. As WLRM, the station aired a blend of religious and secular music as an outreach effort to "unchurched" residents of the Memphis area.

=== WLRM today ===
In September 2004, World Overcomers Outreach Ministries Church, Inc., (Alton R. Williams, president) reached a deal to sell WLRM to CPT & T Radio Station, Inc. (Eric M. Westenbarger, president) for a reported sale price of $400,000 in cash. The FCC approved the sale on December 29, 2004, and the transaction was formally consummated on January 18, 2005.

On July 6, 2014, Affirmative Media Partners, LLC (Kevin Fox, President) started daily programming of WLRM changing the format to blues and southern soul. The station is branded as "AM 1380 WLRM".

Former morning drive personality, Spanky Brown, whose real name was Byron Yedell, died May 11, 2018, in Virginia. There has been no regular morning drive programming at WLRM since Browns death. Long time afternoon drive personality, and host of "Talk To Me," Greg Peters, died May 6, 2021, in Tennessee.
