= WJLX =

- Jasper, Alabama; United States
- Broadcast area: Walker County
- Frequency: 1240 kHz
- Branding: WJLX 101.5 FM

Programming
- Format: Oldies

Ownership
- Owner: Jonathan Timmons; (Blue Door Broadcasting)
- Sister stations: WJBE-FM

History
- First air date: March 1, 1957
- Former call signs: WARF (1957–2003); WTID (2003–2004); WLYJ (2004–2007); WZTQ (2007–2008)

Technical information
- Licensing authority: FCC
- Facility ID: 54798
- Class: C
- Power: 1,000 watts (unlimited); 100 watts (STA)
- Transmitter coordinates: 33°48′54″N 87°16′19″W
- Translator: 101.5 W268BM (Jasper)

Links
- Public license information: Public file; LMS
- Webcast: Listen live
- Website: wjlx1015.com

WJLX (1240 AM) is a radio station in Jasper, Alabama. It airs a full-service/oldies format. The station is owned by Jonathan Timmons with Blue Door Broadcasting holding the broadcast license. The studios and offices are on Alabama State Route 195 in Jasper.

WJLX is authorized to broadcast at 1,000 watts, but the station has special temporary authority from the FCC to broadcast at 100 watts. Programming is also heard on 250-watt FM translator W268BM at 101.5 MHz. Known as “The Sound of Walker County,” WJLX also broadcasts Jasper Vikings high school athletics.

== History ==
The station began broadcasting on March 1, 1957, as WARF. It was owned by Hudson C. Millar Jr. with the license held by the Walker County Broadcasting Company and it was a 250-watt station. Millar also owned WKPL in Cullman. The station was sold to Radio South, a consortium of four men, in 1965 for $102,500. By 1993, Houston Pearce was the full owner of Radio South; that year, WARF and WFFN, then located in Jasper, were sold to a new firm led by Houston Pearce, Voncile Pearce, and Vachel Posey Jr., the latter two senior managers of Radio South. At that time, WARF had a country music format with news and talk features.

In September 1993, Radio South, Inc., reached an agreement to sell country music-formatted WARF to New Century Radio, Inc. The deal was approved by the FCC on September 27, 1993.

The station was assigned the call letters WTID by the FCC on January 9, 2003. In May 2004, New Century Radio, Inc. (Vachel L. Posey Jr., president) reached an agreement to sell WTID to Joy Christian Communications Inc. (Ed L. Smith, president) for a reported sale price of $200,000. The deal was approved by the FCC on June 28, 2004, and the transaction was consummated on July 9, 2004. At the time of the sale, the station broadcast an oldies music format. The new owners had the FCC change this station's call letters to WLYJ on September 8, 2004.

The station was assigned the call letters WZTQ by the FCC on September 17, 2007, when it swapped with then-sister station WLYJ. Just before the station was put up for sale, on January 29, 2008, the owners had the station's call sign changed again, this time to WJLX.

In February 2008, Joy Christian Communications Inc. reached an agreement to sell WJLX to Walker County Broadcasting through their subsidiary, Wal Win LLC, headed by shareholder Brett Elmore. Wal Win LLC agreed to pay in full the mortgage held against real property (with the pay-off being $300,000) in exchange for the station. The deal was approved by the FCC on March 27, 2008, and the transaction was consummated on April 11, 2008. Elmore, who simultaneously started noncommercial WJBE-FM, initially retained the Southern gospel format instituted by Joy Christian.

The station was assigned the WJLX call letters by the Federal Communications Commission since January 29, 2008, when the call sign was swapped with then-sister station WLYJ.

On September 14, 2009, WJLX changed its format to oldies, branded as "Oldies 101.5", in conjunction with the launch of FM translator W268BM (101.5 MHz). At the time, the area had no station playing oldies music. Unable to pay debts and financially insolvent, Wal Win sold WJLX to the Hattie Reese Trust effective January 19, 2017, for $150,000. The trust acquired W268BM, which was owned separately, at the same time. The station's license was subsequently assigned to John Burdette upon the dissolution of the trust effective November 20, 2017. Effective May 1, 2018, the station was sold to Don Earley, who owns the Alabama Cable Network. In 2022, the station was honored by the Alabama Broadcasters Association for its continuous airing of Words of Truth, a religious program on the air in morning drive for 75 years and presented live every day of the year; that same year, the station relocated its studios to a site on U.S. 78.

In February 2025, Don Earley sold the station to interim general manager Jonathan Timmons for $100,000.

== Radio silence and tower disappearance ==
The station has gone silent several times throughout the last few years due to deferred maintenance involving the 1240 AM tower southeast of Jasper. In February 2024, the station's entire antenna, including the 200 ft (61 m) mast, and most of its transmission equipment within a building nearby, was reported to have been stolen, rendering it unable to broadcast at all over the AM band. The station's request to continue broadcasting on the FM translator alone was denied by the FCC, a decision which was the subject of condemnation by a Wall Street Journal opinion piece.

The incident attracted skepticism from some within the broadcasting industry, who questioned how the tower could possibly have been stolen unnoticed. The condition of the tower site was documented on YouTube in the following days. Brett Elmore, the station's general manager, denied any awareness or involvement in the towers disappearance. Management claimed that they were not aware of the tower's disappearance because remote monitoring and control equipment was too expensive. It was stated that staff only monitored the FM transmission since they would typically receive phone calls if there were a problem with the AM transmission. Within a week, WDXB lent the station HD Radio subchannel space to provide a legal way to feed the translator, allowing normal programming to resume on FM.

The Telecommunications Act of 1996 set a statutory deadline of one year after silence is reported to the FCC – which was February 7, 2024 – for the station to resume broadcasting or face forfeiture of its license. In order to raise funds for a new transmitter, WJLX set up a crowdfunding page which received a total of $23,693 out of its $60,000 goal. The station resumed full broadcasting on February 1, 2025, with power limited to 100 watts, by way of a quarter-wavelength random wire antenna strung up at its transmitter site.
