= KASL =

- Newcastle, Wyoming; United States
- Frequency: 1240 kHz

Programming
- Format: Country music
- Affiliations: Westwood One, ABC News Radio, CBS News Radio, Cowboy State News Network, Northern Broadcasting System, Cowboy Sports Network

Ownership
- Owner: Val Rasmuson Cook

History
- First air date: 1953

Technical information
- Licensing authority: FCC
- Facility ID: 9288
- Class: C
- Power: 1,000 watts unlimited
- Transmitter coordinates: 43°50′47″N 104°12′45″W
- Translator: 94.3 K232FV (Newcastle)

Links
- Public license information: Public file; LMS
- Webcast: Listen
- Website: kaslradio.com

KASL (1240 AM) is a commercial radio station licensed to Newcastle, Wyoming. The station carries a country music format, and broadcasts a 1,000 watt signal. It signed on in 1953.

Weekdays, Kevin Senger from 6:00 AM to 10:00 AM. Otherwise, music is provided by Mainstream Country from Westwood One. Weekday features include "Tradio," "What's Happening" and The Mike Huckabee Report.

KASL has a year-round sports presence, with coverage of Newcastle High School sports, Wyoming Cowboys football and basketball and Wyoming Cowgirls basketball, and the Denver Broncos.

The station's 1,000 watt signal reaches most of the surrounding area fairly well, and also reaches into parts of western South Dakota.

Former logo
