= KCVL =

- Colville, Washington; United States
- Frequency: 1240 kHz

Programming
- Format: Country
- Affiliations: CBS News Radio, Premiere Radio Networks

Ownership
- Owner: North Country Broadcasting
- Sister stations: KCRK-FM

Technical information
- Licensing authority: FCC
- Facility ID: 49195
- Class: C
- Power: 1,000 watts unlimited
- Transmitter coordinates: 48°31′15.00″N 117°54′28.00″W

Links
- Public license information: Public file; LMS
- Website: kcvl.com

KCVL (1240 AM) is a radio station licensed to Colville, Washington, United States. The station is owned by North Country Broadcasting.

== Programming ==
KCVL carries CBS News Radio and Coast to Coast AM.
