= WSQL =

- Brevard, North Carolina; United States
- Frequency: 1240 kHz
- Branding: Q102

Programming
- Format: Classic hits
- Affiliations: AP News; North Carolina News Network; Premiere Networks; Westwood One

Ownership
- Owner: Go Nuts Media LLC.

History
- First air date: 1950
- Former call signs: WPNF; WRAF

Technical information
- Licensing authority: FCC
- Facility ID: 54616
- Class: C
- Power: 1,000 watts unlimited
- Transmitter coordinates: 35°13′23.00″N 82°42′20.00″W
- Translators: 97.3 W247DH (Brevard); 102.1 W271CL (Brevard)

Links
- Public license information: Public file; LMS
- Website: wsqlradio.com

WSQL (1240 AM), also known as Q102, is a radio station located in Brevard, North Carolina broadcasting a "Greatest Hits" format. The station is currently owned by Go Nuts Media LLC.

Q102 / WSQL Radio broadcasts 24 hours a day on 102.1 FM and 1240 AM in Brevard, North Carolina and streams a live signal worldwide via the web at www.WSQLRadio.com.

The station image is "The Home of the White Squirrel", and reflects the presence as The Voice of Transylvania County.

Daytime format is a mix of the greatest hits 1960s, 1970s and 1980s Adult Contemporary music. It also sometimes plays songs from the 1940s and early 1950s.The station airs local news, events, sports, and weather. WSQL is an affiliate of AP News, the North Carolina News Network, Premiere Networks, Westwood One.

WSQL is the voice of the Brevard College Tornados, the Brevard High School Blue Devils, and the Rosman High School Tigers. The station also airs the Tar Heels games during football and basketball seasons.

The station is located at 62 W. Main St., in downtown Brevard. The live disk jockeys broadcast from the front window overlooking Main St.

WSQL Radio launched its website on August 21, 2009. The site offers two separate audio streams. One stream broadcasts 102.1 FM / 1240 AM live twenty-four hours a day, seven days a week. The second stream is used for broadcasting other live events such as Rosman High School sports and other special events.

On January 12, 2015, WSQL changed their format to greatest hits, branded as "Q102", simulcast on FM translator W271CL 102.1 FM Brevard.
