= WEMG (Tennessee) =

- Knoxville, Tennessee; United States
- Frequency: 1430 kHz

Ownership
- Owner: Word of Faith Fellowship

History
- First air date: August 29, 1960
- Last air date: 1988 or 1989
- Former call signs: WFCT (1960–1963); WGYW (1963–1968); WJBE (1968–1979); WBMK (1979–1987)

Technical information
- Power: 1,000 watts

WEMG was a radio station in Knoxville, Tennessee, United States, broadcasting on 1430 AM. Last owned by Word of Faith Fellowship, it broadcast from 1960 to 1988 or 1989. For most of its time on air, it was the only Black-oriented station in East Tennessee, including a decade of ownership by singer James Brown.

== History ==
=== Early years ===
On October 6, 1958, Radio Fountain City, Inc., applied for authority to build a new 1,000-watt, daytime-only radio station in Fountain City, Tennessee, a then-unincorporated community north of Knoxville; the Federal Communications Commission (FCC) granted the application on June 23, 1960. The principal owner of Radio Fountain City was Francke Fox, owner of a radio station in Harlan, Kentucky. At the same time, Sam Thrower led a group known as WFCT, Inc., which also had received a permit for a new radio station there; Fox, already having the call sign, was able to force the Thrower company to change its name.

Programming from WFCT began on August 29, 1960. Less than a year after starting up, WFCT was sold to Radio Tennessee, Inc., whose principals, Frederick Allman and Robert Richards, owned stations in other states, for $60,000. CBS announcer J. Olin Tice then acquired the company in late 1962. Tice applied to move the station from Fountain City to Knoxville proper, using studios in the Farragut Hotel downtown. That April, the call sign was changed to WGYW ("Wonderful Gay Way", referring to Gay Street), but the new designation was not used until a formal relaunch that July.

In February 1967, the station fell into financial dire straits and went off the air with liabilities surpassing $150,000; the two largest creditors, including Tice, forced Radio Tennessee into bankruptcy. A receiver was appointed, and the bankruptcy chancellor initially approved a $75,000 purchase bid by Walter Powell, Jr., of Barbourville, Kentucky.

=== James Brown ownership ===
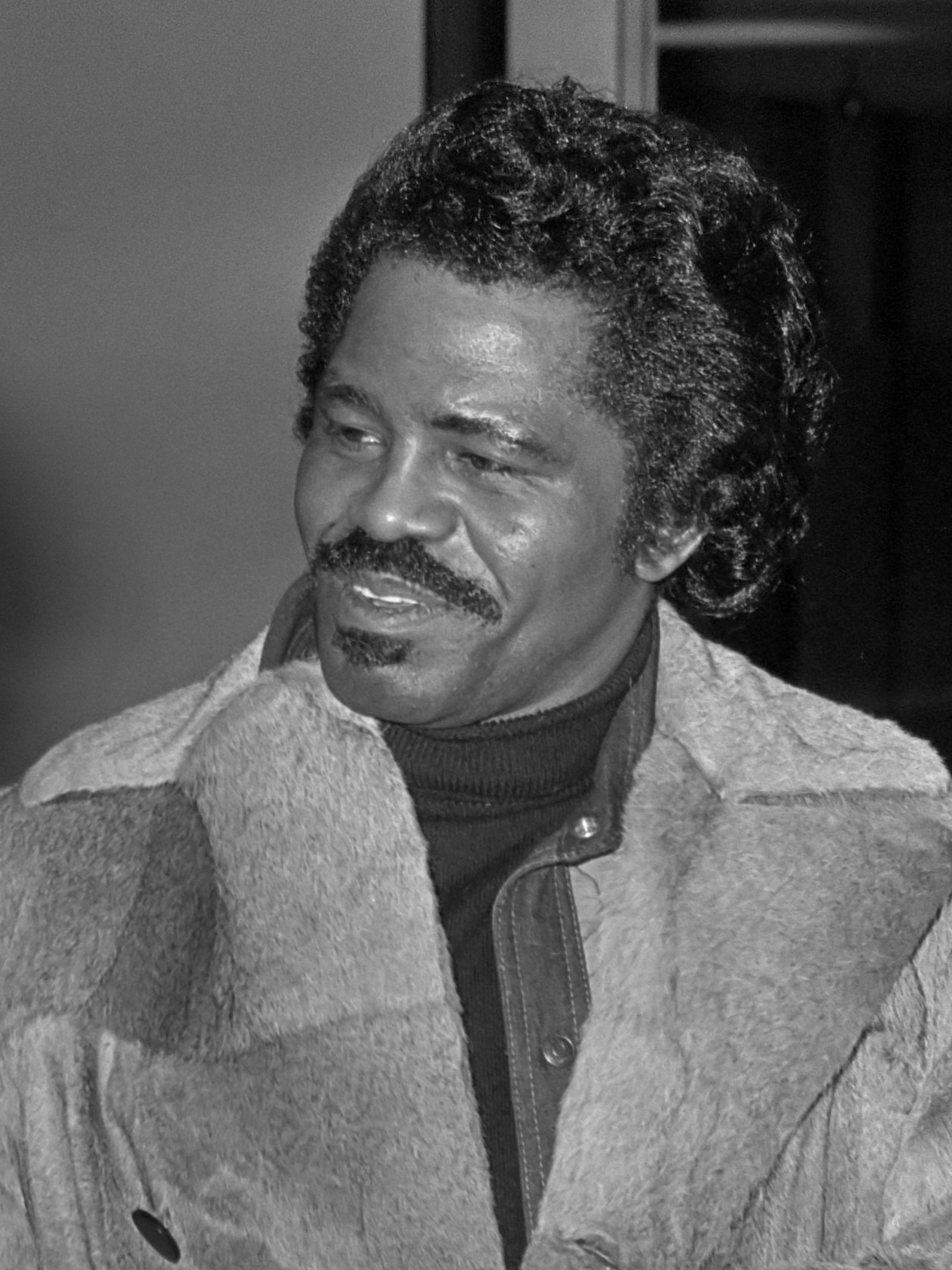
James Brown owned WJBE from 1968 to 1979

The Powell transaction was never filed with the FCC and ultimately fell apart, and receiver H. T. Kern instead applied to sell WGYW to another man who had expressed interest in purchasing the station: James Brown, who also paid $75,000. While studios were retained in the Farragut, when the station returned to the air on January 15, 1968, the call letters were changed to WJBE (for "James Brown Enterprises") and a new format installed to appeal to Knoxville's Black community at what Brown hoped would be the first in a series of stations across the country. The Farragut studios were used for less than a year before relocating to studios on McCalla Avenue, which featured a studio visible to passers-by on the street.

Brown soon acquired additional stations in the South, notable as WJBE was one of just five Black-owned radio stations by 1969. That year, he acquired WRDW in Augusta, Georgia, adding WEBB in Baltimore in 1970. These three stations represented, at that time, one-third of the nine Black-owned outlets in the country.

By 1973, financial issues were noticeable in two actions. The station was garnished in March for failure to pay royalties owed to the writers of 11 songs it played without permission, and later in the year, the federal government filed tax liens against the three JB Broadcasting stations for a total of $94,000 in unpaid taxes, mostly in Baltimore. In 1974, the station lost a contract lawsuit with the Associated Press. It was in 1976, however, that JB Broadcasting's financial picture soured considerably. That August, the Internal Revenue Service (IRS) seized property owned by the station since 1970 on Prosser Road, used for its transmitter site, to be auctioned. Cureton Communications, which was owed $6,000 for the erection of a replacement tower on the site after the original mast was damaged by high winds, forced WJBE into receivership the next month. However, the transfer of WJBE to a receiver was never consummated.

=== Later years ===
In 1979, JB Broadcasting sold WJBE to Broadcast Media of Knoxville, Inc., also a Black-owned firm, which retained the format, changing the call letters to WBMK. A change in shareholders of the company in 1983 brought in Bill Hays as a new half-owner for a time, but Thomas S. Crawford, the other owner, soon developed financial problems. On September 9, 1985, IRS representatives seized the transmitter site again, this time taking the station off the air. The move came just as WBMK had crept into the top 10 in the Knoxville radio ratings.

WBMK returned to the air on October 7, nearly a month after the seizure, but significant damage had been done by the short outage. WKGN (1340 AM) dropped its evening talk programs to adopt an urban contemporary format and fill the void left by WBMK's silence. In late October, it then went full-time urban, cancelling its local sports talk show and other programs that no longer fit the format. In May 1986, Broadcast Media of Knoxville filed for bankruptcy, and on June 10, WBMK—a daytime-only station losing out to the reformatted WKGN—went off the air.

Crawford first sought to sell WBMK to Sunstar, Inc., but a deal was ultimately reached to sell the station to Word of Faith Fellowship, which returned it to air in 1987 as WEMG. The station soon after went off the air for good between 1988 and 1989. (Note: Sources vary on when WEMG ceased broadcasting. A 1993 list of silent AM stations in DX News gives its last air date as February 1988. The M Street Journal, in noting the license's expiration in 1996, gave a 1989 date for its last broadcast. A trustee's sale was slated in 1988 for the Prosser Road property due to indebtedness.)

== Legacy ==
In 2012, former Tennessee state representative Joe E. Armstrong, who had worked as a salesman at WJBE while in college, acquired a station in the Knoxville area, the former WKTI and WWAM at 1040 kHz, and gave it the WJBE call sign; at the time, the city had no stations catering to the Black community.
