= Merlin Miller =

American film director

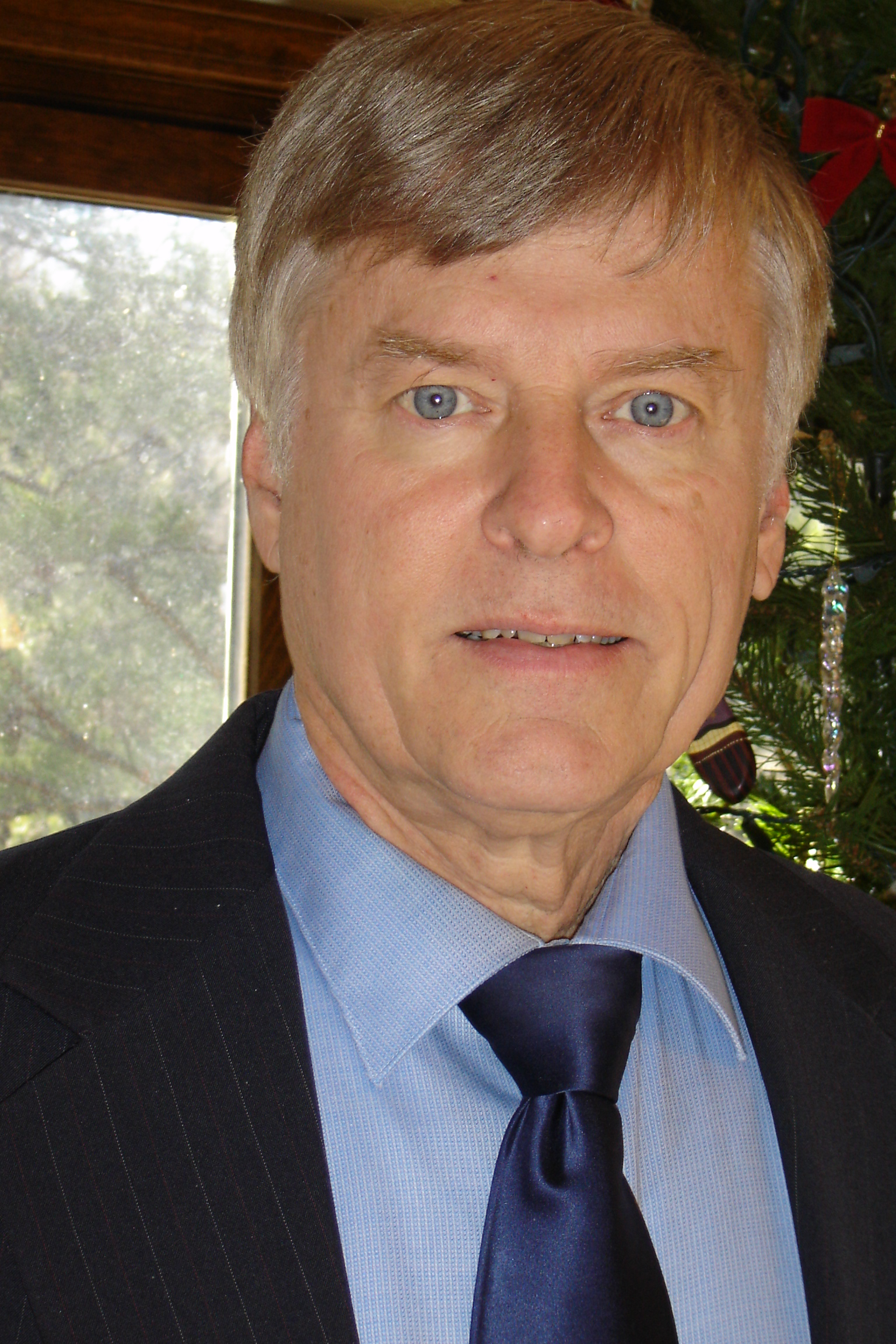
- Miller in 2012
- Born: Merlin L. Miller; Des Moines, Iowa, U.S.
- Occupations: Film director, producer, writer,
- Political party: American Eagle Party (2016); American Third Position Party (2012)

Merlin L. Miller is an American paleoconservative political activist, independent film director, writer, and producer. His works include the television film A Place to Grow (1998), starring Gary Morris, and the film Jericho (2000), starring Mark Valley. During the 2000s he founded a Tennessee-based production company, Americana Pictures. He has also written articles for the Barnes Review and the Occidental Observer.

Miller was the 2012 presidential nominee of the white nationalist American Third Position Party (now known as the American Freedom Party). Academic and political activist Virginia Abernethy was his running-mate.

== Early years ==
Miller was born in Des Moines, Iowa and was also raised there. He states that he worked as an Industrial engineering manager for Michelin Tire Company. Miller says that in his childhood, he admired Walt Disney and Davy Crockett.

== Career ==
Miller produced and edited Devil Rider (1989), a horror movie starring Tag Groat as the title character. In 1991, Miller produced David Heavener's crime film Prime Target, starring Heavener as policeman John Bloodstone and Isaac Hayes as Captain Tompkins.

Miller co-produced the action film A Mission to Kill (1992), starring William Smith as a mentally unstable Vietnam veteran, Boris Catuli. Tag Groat, who played the title role in Devil Rider, also appeared in this film.

Miller returned to film making with A Place to Grow (1998), which he wrote, directed, and produced. The movie starred country singer Gary Morris; actors John Beck and Wilford Brimley, as well as hobo music artist Boxcar Willie, also appeared in it.

Miller produced and directed a western movie, Jericho (2000), with Mark Valley as the title character. Retired Marine Corps drill instructor R. Lee Ermey appeared in the movie, as did Buck Taylor and country artist Lisa Stewart.

Miller's shift in ideology led him to found Americana Pictures, based in Gatlinburg, Tennessee, Miller's current home. According to its mission statement, the company aims "to develop, produce and market quality motion pictures, which promote fresh talent and the best of traditional European-American ideals." Americana Pictures' first film was said to be about the USS Liberty incident, which he referred to as a "shocking Israeli attack" on the United States. He said he was planning to produce The Liberator (which was to be based on the history of Arminius and the Battle of the Teutoburg Forest).

== Ideology ==
During the 2000s, Miller began to take on an increasingly paleoconservative political stance. He also became harshly critical of Hollywood, claiming that it "surreptitiously seeks to destroy our European-American heritage and our Christian-based traditional values, and replace them with values that debase these traditional values and elevate minorities as paragons of virtue and wisdom.... Today's motion pictures, in concert with other forms of mass media entertainment, are the greatest enemies to the well-being of our progeny and the future of our country." Miller has also accused Hollywood of being under "Jewish-Zionist control"; he cites Kevin B. MacDonald as influencing this belief. He has criticized celebrities such as Quentin Tarantino and Madonna, saying that they are "dysfunctional" and "come from traditional Christian or European-American backgrounds but are notorious for spurning those values." He has cited Mel Gibson and his self-marketed movie The Passion of the Christ as inspirations.

Miller also spoke at the 2008 national conference of the Council of Conservative Citizens, of which he is also a member. Miller has stated that while he does not share all the goals of the COfCC members, and rejects "extremist stances", he nonetheless agrees with the group's statement of principles. Miller states that he "doesn't like" interracial marriage but that he does not support outlawing interracial marriage. Miller has denied being antisemitic, instead claiming that he merely opposes "favoritism" granted to Jews in the film industry. He also opposes illegal immigration and what he refers to as "wide open borders" in the United States.

Miller was a noted participant in the International Conference on Hollywoodism in Iran. After his return from Iran in 2012, he wrote on his website that he realized that the people who wanted a war between the US and Iran are "globalists (international bankers and their multinational beneficiaries). They control Israel, the American media and most of our politicians…and by extension our foreign policy."

== Political activities ==
In 2008, Miller contributed $200 to the presidential campaign of Republican Congressman Ron Paul. He also served as a delegate for Paul's campaign.

In January 2012, Miller was nominated by the American Third Position Party (later known as the American Freedom Party) for President of the United States in the 2012 election. He was the party's first presidential candidate nominee after its foundation in 2010. He gained ballot access in Colorado, New Jersey and Tennessee. During the 2012 election, he received 2,307 votes (~0.0%) in these states.

In September 2012, Miller met with Iranian president Mahmoud Ahmedinejad for nearly 20 minutes and discussed a number of issues, including what both Miller and Ahmedinejad characterize as the "Zionist-controlled media" in the West. Miller publicly defended Ahmedinejad as someone who has been unfairly demonized in Western media and who cares about his people. Ahmedinejad gave Miller a collection of poems by Omar Khayyam.
