= 2012 United States presidential election in New Jersey =

- November 6, 2012 (Note: Some voters in areas affected by Hurricane Sandy were allowed to cast votes through November 9.)
- Turnout: 66.91% (▼5.78%)

Nominee	Barack Obama	Mitt Romney
Party	Democratic	Republican
Home state	Illinois	Massachusetts
Running mate	Joe Biden	Paul Ryan
Electoral vote	14	0
Popular vote	2,126,610	1,478,749
Percentage	58.38%	40.59%

Obama
40–50%
50–60%
60–70%
70–80%
80–90%
90–100%
Romney
40–50%
50–60%
60–70%
70–80%
80–90%
President before election
Barack Obama
Democratic
Elected President
Barack Obama
Democratic

The 2012 United States presidential election in New Jersey took place on November 6, 2012, as part of the 2012 United States presidential election in which all 50 states plus the District of Columbia participated. Voters in the state chose 14 electors to represent them in the Electoral College via a popular vote pitting incumbent Democratic President Barack Obama and his running mate, Vice President Joe Biden, against Republican challenger and former Massachusetts Governor Mitt Romney and his running mate, Congressman Paul Ryan.

New Jersey was won by President Obama with 58.38% of the vote to Romney's 40.59%, a 17.79% margin of victory, an increase from 15.53% in 2008. New Jersey was 1 of just 6 states to swing in President Obama's favor between 2008 and 2012, giving him the largest vote share for a Democratic presidential nominee in the state since Lyndon Johnson's 1964. Obama won over many municipalities in northeastern New Jersey that voted Republican in 2008.

As of the 2024 presidential election, this is the last time a Democrat has won Salem County.

== Primary elections ==
=== Democratic primary ===
Incumbent Barack Obama ran unopposed in the Democratic primary held on June 5, 2012. He received 283,673 votes according to the Secretary of State, though county clerks' websites report write-in votes as well. The state's 172 delegates voted unanimously for Obama at the 2012 Democratic National Convention in Charlotte, North Carolina.

=== Republican primary ===
2012 New Jersey Republican presidential primary
- June 5, 2012

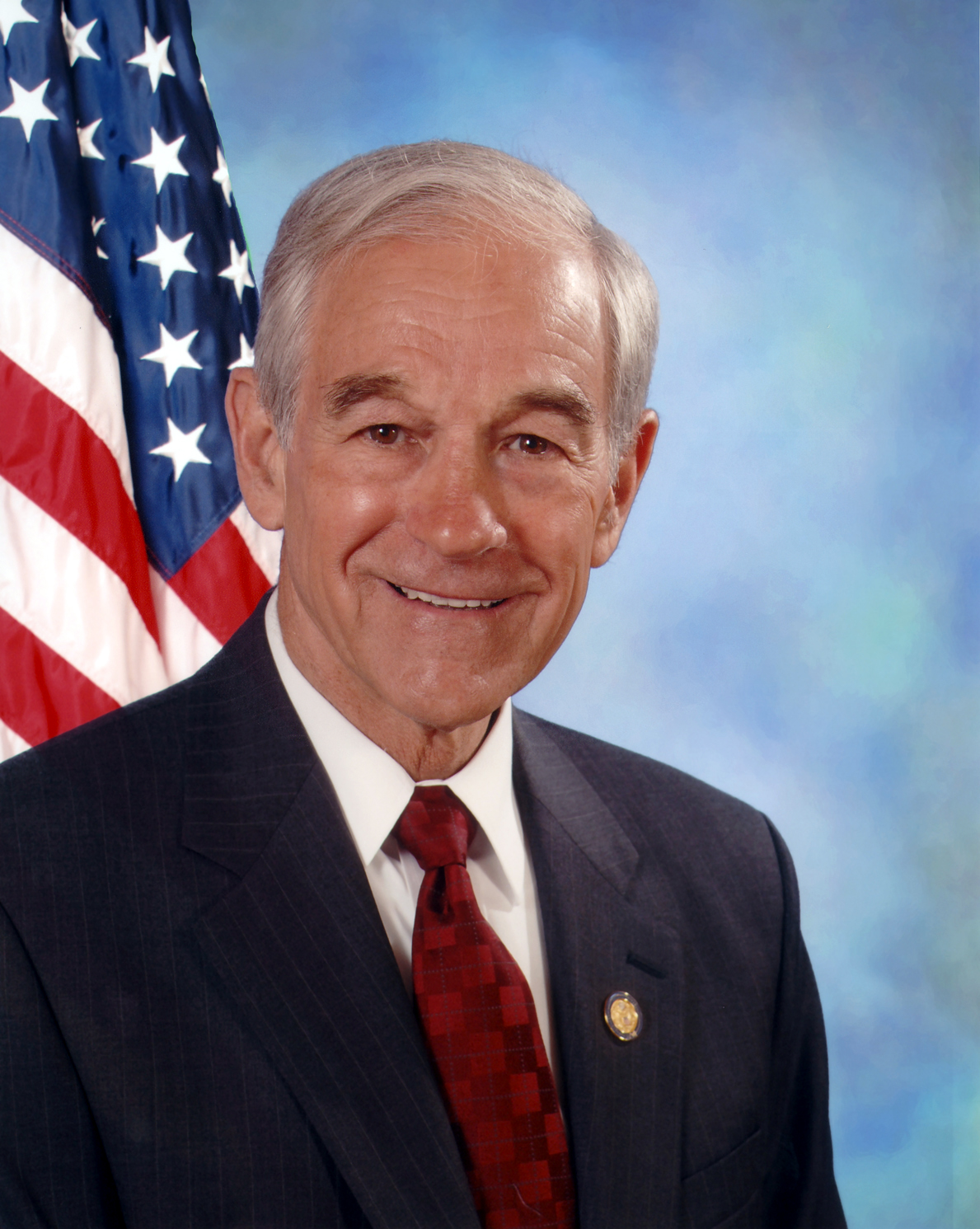
Candidate	Mitt Romney	Ron Paul
Party	Republican	Republican
Home state	Massachusetts	Texas
Delegate count	50	0
Popular vote	188,121	24,017
Percentage	81.3%	10.4%

The Republican primary occurred on June 5, 2012.

New Jersey sent 50 delegates to the Republican National Convention on August 5, 2012. All 50 delegates were awarded by a winner-take-all statewide vote. New Jersey Republican Party rules obligate and require the delegates to cast their vote for the winner of the primary on the first 3 ballots at the convention.

New Jersey Republican primary, 2012
Candidate	Votes	Percentage	Delegates
Mitt Romney	188,121	81.3%	50
Ron Paul	24,017	10.4%	0
Rick Santorum	12,115	5.2%	0
Newt Gingrich	7,212	3.1%	0
Pledged leaders:			3
Total:	231,465	100.0%	50

Key:	Withdrew prior to contest

== General election ==
=== Predictions ===
Source	Ranking	As of
Huffington Post	Safe D	November 6, 2012
CNN	Safe D	November 6, 2012
New York Times	Safe D	November 6, 2012
Washington Post	Safe D	November 6, 2012
RealClearPolitics	Solid D	November 6, 2012
Sabato's Crystal Ball	Solid D	November 5, 2012
FiveThirtyEight	Solid D	November 6, 2012

=== Candidate ballot access ===
- Barack Obama/Joseph Biden, Democratic
- Mitt Romney/Paul Ryan, Republican
- Merlin Miller/Harry Bertram, American Third Position
- Virgil Goode/Jim Clymer, Constitution
- Jill Stein/Cheri Honkala, Green
- Gary Johnson/James P. Gray, Libertarian
- Rocky Anderson/Luis J. Rodriguez, Justice
- Jeff Boss/Bob Pasternak, NSA Did 911
- Peta Lindsay/Yari Osorio, Socialism and Liberation
- James Harris/Maura Deluca, Socialist Workers

=== Effects of Hurricane Sandy on voting ===
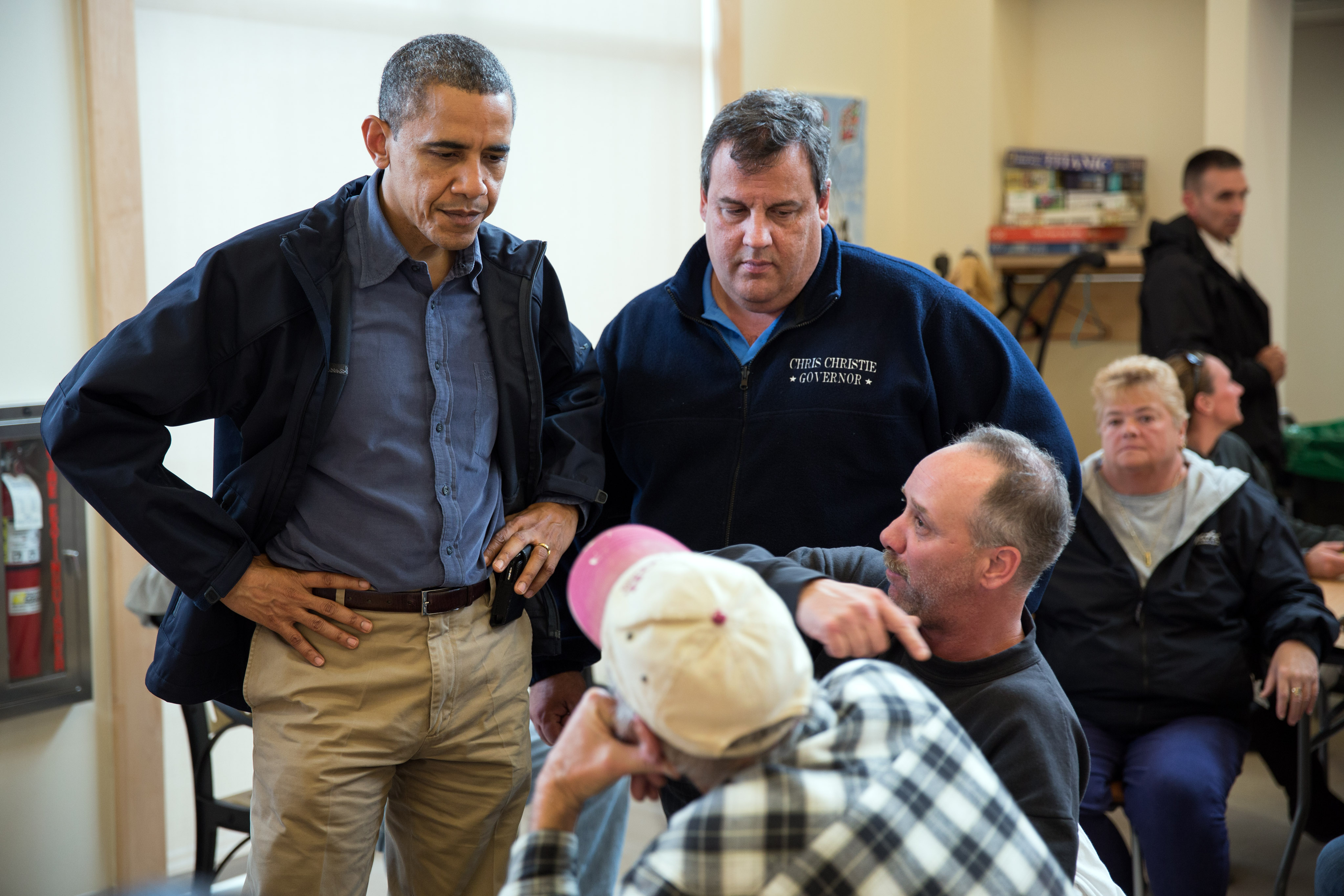
Governor Chris Christie and President Barack Obama talking with residents of New Jersey about the storm damage

'Chris Christie On Post-Sandy Obama Meet- I Would Do It Again video from MSNBC in 2017 in the aftermath of Hurricane Harvey

New Jersey Governor Chris Christie offered praise for the President and his reaction to the hurricane. The two of them also toured the areas of New Jersey that were hard-hit by the hurricane. Christie stated he still supported Mitt Romney and was opposed to many of Obama's policies, but thought Obama deserved credit for his help in the disaster relief in New Jersey. Christie faced significant backlash before and after the election from conservative Republicans who accused him of acting to bolster his own personal political standing at the expense of Romney and the party.

Due to the difficulty of getting to polling places because of the damage caused by Hurricane Sandy, voters who were displaced were allowed to request absentee ballots through email, which they would then return by email or fax, as well as mailing the original ballot back by November 19.

Various issues and delays were subsequently incurred. Officials were not prepared for the 15 minutes that it took to validate each request, and received many requests from voters not displaced who incorrectly believed they were eligible to participate in the program; due to these delays, email voting was extended until Friday, November 9, at 8 PM. Requests had to be submitted by 5 PM on November 6. On November 26, days before the state's deadline to certify election results, it was reported that the 10,000 or so emailed ballots had yet to be tallied, and officials in several counties remained unaware about the requirement to mail in ballots that had already been sent by email or fax.

It is likely that Obama's response to the hurricane, approved by 77% of Obama voters (with 8% disapproving and 15% unsure) and 44% (with 21% disapproving and 35% unsure) of Romney's voters, boosted his performance in New Jersey, which was hit hard by the superstorm.

=== Results ===
Vote share by Legislative district Romney: 50–60%; 60–70%; Obama: 50–60%; 60–70%; 70–80%; 80–90%

2012 United States presidential election in New Jersey
Party	Candidate	Running mate	Votes	Percentage	Electoral votes
Democratic	Barack Obama (incumbent)	Joe Biden (incumbent)	2,126,610	58.25%	14
Republican	Mitt Romney	Paul Ryan	1,478,749	40.50%	0
Libertarian	Gary Johnson	Jim Gray	21,045	0.58%	0
Green	Jill Stein	Cheri Honkala	9,888	0.27%	0
Constitution	Virgil Goode	Jim Clymer	2,064	0.06%	0
Justice	Rocky Anderson	Luis J. Rodriguez	1,724	0.05%	0
NSA Did 911	Jeff Boss	Bob Pasternak	1,007	0.03%	0
Socialist Workers	James Harris	Maura Deluca	710	0.02%	0
American Third Position	Merlin Miller	Harry Bertram	664	0.02%	0
Socialism and Liberation	Peta Lindsay	Yari Osorio	521	0.01%	0
Totals			3,640,292	100.00%	14
Voter Turnout (Registered)					66.4%

Results of the general election by municipality, darker colors indicate higher win percentage: -Blue municipalities won by Obama -Red municipalities won by Romney

==== By county ====
County	Barack Obama Democratic		Mitt Romney Republican		Various candidates Other parties		Margin		Total votes cast
County	#	%	#	%	#	%	#	%	Total votes cast
Atlantic	65,600	57.88%	46,522	41.04%	1,222	1.08%	19,078	16.84%	113,344
Bergen	212,754	55.12%	169,070	43.80%	4,166	1.08%	43,684	11.32%	385,990
Burlington	126,377	58.42%	87,401	40.40%	2,561	1.18%	38,976	18.02%	216,339
Camden	153,682	68.02%	69,476	30.75%	2,791	1.23%	84,206	37.27%	225,949
Cape May	21,657	45.03%	25,781	53.61%	655	1.36%	-4,124	-8.58%	48,093
Cumberland	34,055	61.51%	20,658	37.31%	656	1.18%	13,397	24.20%	55,369
Essex	237,035	77.95%	64,767	21.30%	2,269	0.75%	172,268	56.65%	304,071
Gloucester	74,013	54.59%	59,456	43.86%	2,101	1.55%	14,557	10.73%	135,570
Hudson	153,108	77.45%	42,369	21.43%	2,217	1.12%	110,739	56.02%	197,694
Hunterdon	26,876	40.34%	38,687	58.07%	1,061	1.59%	-11,811	-17.73%	66,624
Mercer	104,377	67.19%	47,355	30.48%	3,623	2.33%	57,022	36.71%	155,355
Middlesex	190,555	63.13%	107,310	35.55%	3,995	1.32%	83,245	27.58%	301,860
Monmouth	133,820	46.84%	148,000	51.81%	3,847	1.35%	-14,180	-4.97%	285,667
Morris	100,563	43.98%	125,279	54.79%	2,805	1.23%	-24,716	-10.81%	228,647
Ocean	102,300	40.62%	146,475	58.16%	3,079	1.22%	-44,175	-17.54%	251,854
Passaic	115,926	63.62%	64,523	35.41%	1,765	0.97%	51,403	28.21%	182,214
Salem	14,719	49.69%	14,334	48.39%	570	1.92%	385	1.30%	29,623
Somerset	74,592	52.10%	66,603	46.52%	1,985	1.38%	7,989	5.58%	143,180
Sussex	26,104	38.28%	40,625	59.57%	1,465	2.15%	-14,521	-21.29%	68,194
Union	139,752	66.52%	68,314	32.52%	2,022	0.96%	71,438	34.00%	210,088
Warren	18,745	41.27%	25,744	56.69%	926	2.04%	-6,999	-15.42%	45,415
Totals	2,126,610	58.25%	1,478,749	40.50%	45,781	1.25%	647,861	17.75%	3,651,140

==== By congressional district ====
Obama won eight of 12 congressional districts, including two that elected Republicans.

District	Obama	Romney	Representative
1st	65%	34%	Rob Andrews
2nd	54%	45%	Frank LoBiondo
3rd	52%	47%	Jon Runyan
4th	45%	54%	Chris Smith
5th	49%	51%	Scott Garrett
6th	61%	37%	Frank Pallone Jr.
7th	46%	53%	Leonard Lance
8th	78%	21%	Albio Sires
9th	68%	31%	Bill Pascrell
10th	88%	12%	Donald Payne Jr.
11th	47%	52%	Rodney Frelinghuysen
12th	67%	32%	Rush Holt Jr.

== Analysis ==
New Jersey was one of just six states that voted more Democratic in 2012 than it had in 2008. In 2008, Obama won the state by roughly 602,000 votes, whereas in 2012, this margin increased to about 648,000 votes. Obama's increased statewide margin owed itself to larger Democratic margins in several central and northern counties. In Middlesex, Hudson, Passaic, and Union Counties collectively, Obama netted nearly 45,000 additional votes compared to 2008. Outside of these four counties, most others in the state had comparable margins to 2008.

Turnout patterns relative to 2008 arguably helped Obama increase his statewide margin. Every county cast fewer votes in 2012 than in 2008, but not uniformly so. Perhaps due to the effects of Hurricane Sandy, conservative Monmouth County saw the largest percentage decrease in votes cast from 2008, with Ocean County also witnessing a substantial decline in votes cast. In the northwestern part of the state, strongly Republican Sussex and Warren County experienced moderately lower turnout. In terms of raw votes cast, Passaic County, which was strongly Democratic, came closest to its 2008 figures, with just 5,000 fewer votes cast in 2012 than in 2008.

Obama's improved performance was quite unusual as his performance worsened in most other areas of the nation (particularly the Midwest and Rust Belt). It is likely this was due to his widely approved response to Hurricane Sandy, which had a devastating effect on the state, causing two million households to lose power, destroying 346,000 homes, and causing blockades on bridges and roads for up to two weeks. Obama's response to the superstorm also likely contributed to his improved performance. According to a poll conducted by ABC News and The Washington Post, not only did 77% of Obama's voters approve of his handling of the storm (with 8% disapproving and 15% unsure), he also received a plurality amongst Romney voters, with 44% approving of his handling, 21% disapproving, and 35% unsure. Another poll by the Pew Research Center found that 67% of registered voters approved of Obama's response with only 15% disapproving. Chris Christie, the state's Republican governor called Obama's response to the hurricane "outstanding" and praised him for his frequent coordination with the New Jersey government, potentially boosting his popularity amongst Republican voters.

== See also ==
- United States presidential elections in New Jersey
- New Jersey Republican Party
- 2012 Republican Party presidential primaries
