= Fametracker =

Fametracker was a popular culture website which called itself "The Farmer's Almanac of Celebrity Worth". The site was started in 1999 by Tara Ariano (screenname Wing Chun), a sometime MSNBC.com contributor, and her husband David T. Cole (screenname Glark), who lived at the time in Toronto and also co-created Television Without Pity, along with friend Adam Sternbergh.

Fametracker was known for its monthly Fame Audits, in which a particular celebrity's level of fame was assessed in comparison to other celebrities. Other regular Fametracker features included "2 Stars 1 Slot" in which two similar celebrities sparred for a single dubious title or niche; and "Hey It's That Guy!" which traced the burgeoning career of an unknown but recognizable actor. The "Hey It’s That Guy!" feature was inspired by legendary character actor J. T. Walsh, who appeared in over 60 films but was not well known by name. The creators expanded upon this idea in 2005 by publishing Hey! It's That Guy!: The Fametracker.com Guide to Character Actors.

For over five years, Fametracker also operated extensive message boards, which were frequented at one point by over 100 posters. The message boards closed in March 2005 when the moderators could no longer afford the excessive bandwidth.

The final new article was posted on Fametracker.com on 26 February 2007 - since then, the site has displayed a message saying "Fametracker is on hiatus until further notice", though the existing content archive remains available to site visitors.

Many of Fametracker's functions have since been merged into Television Without Pity.
