= Kellye Nakahara =

American actress (1948–2020)

- Born: Kellye Nakahara Watson; January 16, 1948; Honolulu, Territory of Hawaii, U.S.
- Died: February 16, 2020 (aged 72); Pasadena, California, U.S.
- Other name: Kellye Wallett
- Occupations: Actress, watercolor artist
- Spouse: David Wallett (m. 1967)
- Children: 2

Kellye Nakahara Wallett (January 16, 1948 – February 16, 2020) was an American actress, best known for playing Nurse Kellye in 167 episodes of the television comedy series M*A*S*H.

== Life and career ==
Nakahara was born in Honolulu. Before becoming an actress, Nakahara moved to San Francisco to pursue a career in art. In 1967, she married David Wallett and moved to Los Angeles where she began a career as an actress. Halfway through the first season of M*A*S*H, she was cast as Nurse Kellye; she appeared in 167 episodes of the long-running series. Following the series finale of M*A*S*H, Nakahara appeared in television commercials as a spokesperson for IBM. She appeared in several other television shows, and had small parts in the films Clue (1985) as Mrs. Ho, the domestic cook, and in 1995's Black Day Blue Night. She also played a labor and delivery nurse in the 1988 John Hughes film She's Having a Baby.

Nakahara was also a watercolor artist, who painted and exhibited under her married name, Kellye Wallett.

== Death ==
Nakahara died of cancer at her home in Pasadena, California, on February 16, 2020.

== Filmography ==
Film
| Year | Title | Role | Notes |
|---|---|---|---|
| 1985 | Clue | The Cook | |
| 1987 | Amazon Women on the Moon | Theatre Customer #4 | Segment "Peter Pan Theatre" [TV cut & DVD only] |
| 1988 | She's Having a Baby | Hospital Nurse | |
| 1991 | Shattered | Lydia | |
| 1994 | 3 Ninjas Kick Back | Nurse Hino | |
| 1995 | Black Day Blue Night | Fat Mama | |
| 1998 | Dr. Dolittle | Golden Retriever Woman | |
Television
| Year | Title | Role | Notes |
| 1973–1983 | M*A*S*H | Lt. Nurse Kealani Kellye Yamato | Recurring role (167 episodes) |
| 1975 | Kolchak: The Night Stalker | Woman at Lecture | Episode: "The Trevi Collection" |
| 1982 | Little House on the Prairie | Japanese Woman | Episode: "Alden's Dilemma" |
| 1983 | At Ease | Becky Yamato | Episodes: "A Tankful of Dollars", "A PFC and a Gentleman" |
| 1983 | Matt Houston | Charlene | Episode: "Butterfly" |
| 1984 | Lottery! | | Episode: "Honolulu: 3-2=1" |
| 1985 | Otherworld | G.P. Desk Sergeant | Episode: "I Am Woman, Hear Me Roar" |
| 1985 | Hunter | Mrs. Kim | Episode: "The Beach Boy" |
| 1991 | Growing Pains | Reporter | Episode: "Paper Tigers" |
| 1991 | Memories of M*A*S*H | Herself | TV special |
| 1995 | Dream On | Mrs. Kim | Episode: "Flight of the Pedalbee" |
| 1997 | Crisis Center | Florence | Episode: "It's a Family Affair" |
| 1997 | NYPD Blue | Cleaning Lady | Episode: "Emission Impossible" |
| 1999 | Sabrina the Teenage Witch | Pele | Episode: "The Good, the Bad and the Luau" |
| 2000 | The Wild Thornberrys | Yak (voice) | Episode: "Happy Campers" |
