= Breakdown (1997 film) =

1997 film by Jonathan Mostow

- Theatrical release poster
- Directed by: Jonathan Mostow
- Screenplay by: Jonathan Mostow; Sam Montgomery
- Story by: Jonathan Mostow
- Produced by: Dino De Laurentiis; Martha De Laurentiis
- Starring: Kurt Russell; J. T. Walsh; Kathleen Quinlan
- Cinematography: Douglas Milsome
- Edited by: Derek Brechin; Kevin Stitt
- Music by: Basil Poledouris
- Production companies: Dino De Laurentiis Company; Spelling Films
- Distributed by: Paramount Pictures
- Release date: May 2, 1997
- Running time: 93 minutes
- Country: United States
- Language: English
- Budget: $36 million
- Box office: $50.2 million

Breakdown is a 1997 American action thriller film directed by Jonathan Mostow from the screenplay he wrote with Sam Montgomery. It stars Kurt Russell as a man whose wife is kidnapped after their car mysteriously breaks down during a cross-country drive, leading him to desperately search for her and confront her captors.

The film also stars J. T. Walsh and Kathleen Quinlan. The original music score was composed and conducted by Basil Poledouris and performed by the Hollywood Studio Symphony. The film was produced by Dino De Laurentiis and Martha De Laurentiis. It was released on May 2, 1997, by Paramount Pictures, to moderately positive reviews.

== Plot ==
Jeff and Amy Taylor are driving from Boston to San Diego in a new Jeep Grand Cherokee. In the Arizona desert, they nearly collide with a battered pickup. At a gas station, the pickup's driver, Earl, angrily confronts Jeff before departing. The Jeep subsequently stalls on a remote stretch of road. Amy accepts a lift from passing semi-truck driver, Red Barr, to seek assistance at a nearby diner, while Jeff remains with the vehicle.

Inspecting the engine, Jeff discovers some wiring that is not connected. After reconnecting them, he arrives at the diner, where the owner and patrons insist that Amy never appeared. Back on the road, Jeff intercepts Red, who denies any knowledge. Sheriff Boyd arrives and, searching the cab, finds nothing and releases Red. He directs Jeff to the sheriff's office in Brackett to report Amy's disappearance.

Returning to the diner, Jeff is approached by Billy, a seemingly slow‑witted mechanic, who claims that Amy left with several men and claims that the police should not be trusted. While following Billy's directions, Jeff is ambushed by Earl. Jeff escapes by plunging the Jeep into a river, but is soon captured by Earl and Billy, the latter having set him up. They take Jeff to Red at an isolated hideout.

Red demands that Jeff withdraw $90,000, which Amy claimed was in their bank account. At the bank in Brackett, Jeff abandons an attempt to alert the manager when he suspects that Red's accomplices are watching him. He is able to take out $5,000 on credit, concealing one‑dollar bills between hundred‑dollar notes to increase the cash volume. He also pockets a letter opener.

Earl collects Jeff and states that the couple will be murdered regardless of the money. Earl discovers the cash ruse just as Jeff frees himself with the opener. He stabs Earl, then binds him with duct tape, while forcing him to reveal a rendezvous point at a truck stop. Sheriff Boyd pulls the truck over and interprets Jeff to be dangerous. Earl shoots and wounds the sheriff but is shot dead in return. Jeff finds Red's truck and stows away while Red drives to his farm.

When Red arrives home its revealed that his real name is Warren and that hes married to a woman named Arleen and together they have a son named Deke. Inside Red's barn, Jeff sees trophies from earlier tourist robbery-murders. Billy and another accomplice, Al, arrive with a bound Amy and lock her in a cellar freezer. Jeff finds a handgun and confronts Red, his accomplices, and family inside the house. A distraction from Deke allows Billy to escape, but Jeff forces Red to open the barn cellar, releasing Amy. He locks Red, Arleen Deke and Al in the cellar. Billy frees them while Jeff and Amy flee in a pickup. Red and his group pursue them in separate vehicles.

Billy's car flips, killing him in an explosion, and Al fatally crashes into Red's detached trailer. On a steel bridge, Red rams the couple's truck into the guard rail, pinning Amy's leg under the dash while leaving both vehicles poised on the ledge. Jeff boards the truck cab, wrestles with Red and hurls him over the edge. Red lands on the rocks below, seriously injured. Jeff frees Amy, who releases the truck's brake, letting it fall over the edge to kill Red. Finally safe, the couple waits for authorities to arrive.

== Cast ==
- Kurt Russell as Jeff Taylor
- J. T. Walsh as Warren 'Red' Barr
- Kathleen Quinlan as Amy Taylor
- M. C. Gainey as Earl
- Jack Noseworthy as Billy
- Ritch Brinkley as Al
- Moira Harris as Arleen Barr
- Rex Linn as Sheriff Boyd
- Kim Robillard as Deputy Sheriff Len Carver
- Jack McGee as Bartender
- Vincent Berry as Deke Barr
- Steve Waddington as Cowboy in bank
- Thomas Kopache as Calhoun

== Production ==
Filming took place between April and June 1996. Breakdown was filmed on location in Sacramento, California; Victorville, California; Pyramid Lake; and Moab, Utah.

== Music ==
The score was written by Basil Poledouris, with contributions from Steve Forman, Judd Miller, Eric Colvin, and Richard Marvin.

It was released as a limited edition of 3,000 units by LaLaLand Records in June 2011. The release comprises a 3-CD set: the first CD contains the score as heard in the film, which contains material from additional composers. This is not fully complete, omitting a few extremely low-key passages from the early scenes, nor is it chronological; some cues have been combined and re-ordered to maintain a listening experience.

The second CD contains an alternative early version of many cues by Poledouris that represent a different, far more orchestral approach to scoring the film. The score in the film stripped away many layers and left mostly percussive and sound design elements for many cues.

The third CD contains further alternates that demonstrate the changing nature of the music as scenes were re-scored.

== Release ==
Breakdown was released in the United States on May 2, 1997. After initially opening to 2,108 theaters, the film later expanded to 2,348 theaters.

It was the final film featuring J. T. Walsh to be released in his lifetime.

== Reception ==
=== Box office ===
Breakdown debuted at first place at the box office with $12.3 million. Ultimately, it grossed a total of $50.2 million in the United States and Canada.

=== Critical reception ===
The review aggregator website Rotten Tomatoes reported that 83% of critics gave the film positive reviews based upon a sample of 58, with an average score of 7.2/10. The site's consensus describes it as "A brainy and suspenseful – if somewhat uneven – thriller". At Metacritic, which assigns a weighted average rating out of 100 to reviews from mainstream critics, the film received an average score of 74 based on 19 reviews. Audiences polled by CinemaScore gave the film an average grade of "B" on an A+ to F scale.

Peter Stack of the San Francisco Chronicle praised the film, "Breakdown use[s] old-fashioned ingenuity – plus a compelling star, a fast-paced mystery and a deadpan villain – to come up with a sizzler." Roger Ebert gave the film a positive review, calling it "taut, skillful and surgically effective".

Stephen Hunter of The Washington Post criticized Russell for not conveying a desperate husband willing to fight for his missing wife, writing "He does a lot of running around while making desperate faces, but he never projects a sense of deep rage. He never gets dangerous. Thus the movie is shorn of its one primitive gratification: the image of the civilized man who finds the Peruvian commando inside himself and lays waste to louts who have underestimated him."

=== Home media and rights ===
Paramount Home Entertainment released the film on a domestic VHS in October 1997, and a DVD followed in 1998. It was released on LaserDisc in the US in October 1997, with a subtitled Hong Kong LaserDisc being released in November 1997, via ERA Home Entertainment. The following year, it also received LaserDisc releases in France, Germany, Japan and Singapore. The French LaserDisc was handled by PFC Vidéo, with the German LaserDisc being handled by Laser Paradise. The French and German LaserDiscs both featured dubbed audio tracks, unlike Pioneer LDC's Japanese LaserDisc, which featured the original audio track with Japanese subtitles.

Breakdown was a co-production between Dino De Laurentiis Company and Spelling Films, with distribution handled by Paramount Pictures. In the credits, Paramount Pictures and Spelling Films were listed as the joint copyright holders. At the time of the film's release, Paramount's parent company Viacom held a majority stake in Spelling Films, part of Spelling Entertainment. They acquired their stake in Spelling Entertainment in 1994, through the purchase of Blockbuster, which itself had a 67% stake in Spelling Entertainment since 1993. Viacom bought the remaining stake in Spelling Entertainment in March 1999, which further solidified Paramount's ownership of Breakdown.

It received an Australian Blu-ray release in February 2021, from local distributor Imprint, under license from Paramount. This was the film's first ever Blu-ray release and initially limited to 1,500 copies. A US Blu-ray was released by Paramount Home Entertainment in September 2021, under its "Paramount Presents" line. The US Blu-ray featured a new audio commentary with Jonathan Mostow and Kurt Russell, and a new interview with Kathleen Quinlan. It featured an alternate opening of the film and an isolated score.

Paramount Home Entertainment released it on a 4K Ultra HD Blu-ray in October 2024. This was part of its Paramount Scares line of releases (focusing on horror films), even though Breakdown is generally categorized as a thriller film rather than as a horror film.

The film was made available on the digital platforms Apple TV, Amazon Prime and Google Play. It was formerly available on Fox Corporation's free streaming service Tubi, later being made available on Paramount's own free streaming service Pluto TV. In March 2021, Breakdown was made available on Paramount then-new subscription streaming service Paramount+, as one of its inaugural launch titles. In Australia it was on the streaming service for the Paramount-owned broadcaster Network 10. In Australia, it was also available on Fetch TV.

== Remake ==
- Vidaamuyarchi – a 2025 Indian Tamil film.
