= Black Day Blue Night =

- Film poster
- Directed by: J. S. Cardone
- Written by: J. S. Cardone
- Produced by: Carol Kottenbrook
- Starring: Gil Bellows; Michelle Forbes; Mia Sara; J. T. Walsh; Tim Guinee; John Beck
- Release date: October 1995 (Hamptons International Film Festival)
- Running time: 93 min
- Country: United States
- Language: English

Black Day Blue Night is a 1995 American crime thriller film directed by J. S. Cardone and starring Gil Bellows, Michelle Forbes, Mia Sara, J. T. Walsh, Tim Guinee, and John Beck.

The film is about two women, Hallie (Sara) and Rinda (Forbes), who pick up a mysterious hitchhiker, Dodge (Bellows), while driving from Utah to Phoenix. As Utah State police lieutenant Quinn (Walsh) investigates a robbery-murder linked to a missing $1 million, he becomes entangled with the trio.

The reviews for Black Day Blue Night were positive. It highlight its strengths as a well-executed, low-budget noir with engaging performances, Forbes, Sara, Bellows and Walsh. Critics appreciated the moody desert setting and the script's ability to maintain intrigue. Without breaking new ground and clunky elements, it compensates with a talented cast and a refreshing take on the crime genre.

== Premise ==
A wife's husband is cheating on her. She decides to go on a road trip with her husband's other woman. While driving the two women pick up a hitchhiker. The man they pick up may be a robber and murderer on the run from the cops. A policeman who is tracking the hitchhiker has a close eye on them, but the question is why?

== Cast ==
- Gil Bellows as Hitchhiker Dodge
- Michelle Forbes as Rinda Woolley
- Mia Sara as Hallie Schrag
- J. T. Walsh as Lt. John Quinn
- Tim Guinee as Bo Schrag
- John Beck as Chief Morris Reed
- F. J. Flynn as Odell
- Norman Patrick Brown as Begay
- Benjamin Lum as Hop Chung
- Kellye Nakahara as Fat Mama
- Michael Holmes as Bus Clerk
- Thomas Redhouse as Navajo Man
- Caroline Barclay as Dutton
- Kirk Baily as Mayors Assistant
- Jack Leal as Trooper #1
- Beth Ann Styne as Patsy Petlow
- Dale Swann as Patrolman
- Melody Rae as Counter Girl
- Bill Watkins as Minister
- K. C. Brooks as Mrs. Reed
- Gerry Giss as Trading Post Owner
- Raylene Begay as Native American Waitress
- Daiton Rutkowski as Trucker
- Dave Adams as Vern Pender
- Jennifer Taliman as Navajo Woman
- Clotairo as himself

== Reception ==
Entertainment Weekly said, "Black Day Blue Night is a surprisingly pleasant ride," giving it a B−.

Greg Evans of Variety liked the film and wrote "despite some surprises, final reel wrap-up unspools awkwardly, lurching from one twist to another after the main McGuffin has been revealed. Still, Cardone’s script does keep a step ahead of the audience, and a compellingly hard-bitten perf by Michelle Forbes."

The TV Guide review describes it as a well-executed low-budget noir that benefits from strong performances by Michelle Forbes, J.T. Walsh, Gil Bellows, and Mia Sara. The film's strengths include its moody desert atmosphere and a solid script that provides enough twists to keep the story engaging, avoiding the over-the-top, ironic style of many postmodern crime films. The characters, portrayed by a talented cast, are given surprising depth for a modern crime thriller. However, some plot twists feel predictable, the dialogue can drag in places, and the ending, while true to the noir genre, lacks emotional impact. Despite these flaws, it remains a refreshing departure from more exaggerated crime thrillers.

Roger Hurlburt in his review published in the South Florida Sun Sentinel three out of five stars. He explains that "it is a witty and wily imitation" of Pulp Fiction combined with Thelma & Louise. He finalized his review writing that it is "packed with weird, erotic altercations, brutal encounters and some disturbingly smarmy acts, Black Day Blue Night is a generally satisfying foray into sensual melodramatics. Never mind that the film has a couple of false endings too many."

Rene Rodriguez of The Miami Herald gave the film two and half stars out of five, and felt the film was "fun" but "doesn't really break any ground, it knows its limitations." Rodriguez concluded "what Black Day Blue Night lacks in originality it makes up for with the cast's energy. Forbes avoids the usual "tough chick" cliches as the embittered waitress, and Bellows has an appealing laid-back charisma that fits his slippery character well. Writer-director J.S. Cardone takes a few sudden turns in the second half, but even though the movie doesn't end quite the way you'd expect, the greatest appeal of Black Day Blue Night is in the precise way it executes its formula."
