= Jericho (2000 film) =

2000 film by Merlin Miller

- Directed by: Merlin Miller
- Written by: Frank Dana Frankolino; George Leonard Briggs; Robert Avard Miller
- Produced by: Merlin Miller; Gil Dorland
- Starring: Mark Valley; Leon Coffee; R. Lee Ermey; Mason McWilliams; Kateri Walker
- Cinematography: Jerry Holway
- Edited by: Agustin Rexach
- Music by: Mark Haffner
- Release dates: October 2000 (Marco Island Film Festival); October 20, 2001
- Running time: 101 minutes
- Country: United States
- Language: English

Jericho is a 2000 American Western film, produced by Black Night Productions and released in October 2000 starring Mark Valley and directed by Merlin Miller. The filming took place in Alamo Village, Highway 674, Brackettville, Texas, in the United States of America. Jericho, played by Mark Valley, wakes up with no memory, but it's apparent that he's quite skilled with a gun. He is befriended by Joshua (Leon Coffee), who appears to be his polar opposite: He's a black man and true believer in the Lord, whereas Jericho is white and doubtful of everything, especially himself. Side by side, they attempt to piece together the amnesiac's past, which may or may not have something to do with a robbery, and either way is somehow connected to a town that's also called Jericho.

== Cast ==
- Mark Valley as Jericho
- Leon Coffee as Joshua
- R. Lee Ermey as Marshal
- Lisa Stewart as Mary
- Mark Collie as Johnny 'O
- Morgana Shaw as Mildred Flynn
- Buck Taylor as Pap Doolin

== Reception ==
Joe Leydon of Variety called it a non-P.C., bland throwback to Saturday matinee fare.
