= Dale Swann =

American actor

- Born: William Dale Swann; January 21, 1948; Harrisburg, Illinois
- Died: April 9, 2009 (aged 61); Alton, Illinois
- Occupation: Actor

William Dale Swann (January 21, 1948 – April 9, 2009) was an American character actor known for his numerous roles in television, film and commercials.

== Biography ==
=== Early life ===
Dale Swann was born on January 21, 1948, in Harrisburg, Illinois. After his family had relocated to the St. Louis Metro East area, he graduated from East Alton-Wood River High School, then attended Southern Illinois University Edwardsville, where received his bachelor's degree in fine arts.

=== Career ===
Swann relocated to Los Angeles following college, living there for more than thirty years while pursuing his acting career. Performing both television and films roles, Swann was particularly proud of his role a 1987 television movie called Proud Men, which starred Charlton Heston. According to family members, Swann received a personal letter from Heston thanking him for his role in the movie following the end of production.

Swann's film roles included Black Day Blue Night, Demon Knight, Drop Zone, We're Talkin' Serious Money, Gremlins 2: The New Batch and Tango and Cash, and he spent three weeks filming on location in Yugoslavia during the production of the 1991 film, Born to Ride, in which Swann appeared opposite John Stamos.

Swann's television credits included parts in Beverly Hills, 90210, Melrose Place, Adam-12, Quantum Leap, Hunter, Baywatch, Beauty and the Beast and L.A. Law. He also appeared in the miniseries The Alamo: Thirteen Days to Glory and in numerous made-for-television movies, including Everybody's Baby: The Rescue of Jessica McClure, Do You Know the Muffin Man?, Buried Alive, The Court-Martial of Jackie Robinson, Switched at Birth and Willing to Kill: The Texas Cheerleader Story.

To earn income between jobs, Swann worked as a telemarketing representative and in the admitting and billing departments of the UCLA Medical Center.

=== Later life ===
Swann returned to his native Alton, Illinois, in 2003, taking a position with Fabrication Specialists of Illinois, a precision custom manufacturer.

He suffered a stroke in February 2009 and died at his home in Alton on April 9, 2009, at the age of 61. He was survived by his sister, Betty Swann, who described her brother as "...a good actor. He loved acting; he really did. He was able to express a lot of his emotions while acting," in an April 2009 interview with The Telegraph of Alton. Swann never married and had no children. "He loved being independent. He loved just one woman his whole life, even though they never got married or had children," his sister told the paper.

== Filmography ==
Year	Title	Role
1989	Wizards of the Lost Kingdom II	Bearded warrior
1989	Tango & Cash	Captain
1990	Gremlins 2: The New Batch	Clamp Center Surveillance Supervisor
1991	Born to Ride	Sheriff Greaves
1992	We're Talkin' Serious Money	Guard
1994	Drop Zone	747 Captain
1995	Demon Knight	Bus driver
1995	Black Day Blue Night	Patrolman
