= Queenie (miniseries) =

- Print advertisement
- Based on: Queenie by Michael Korda
- Screenplay by: April Smith; James Goldman (as Winston Beard)
- Directed by: Larry Peerce
- Starring: Mia Sara; Joss Ackland; Sarah Miles; Serena Gordon; Kirk Douglas; Leigh Lawson; Gary Cady; Claire Bloom; Topol
- Music by: Georges Delerue
- Country of origin: United States
- Original language: English

Production
- Producer: John Cutts
- Cinematography: Tony Imi
- Editors: Michael Ripps; Eric A. Sears (as Eric Sears)
- Running time: 232 minutes
- Production companies: Von Zerneck/Samuels Productions; Highgate Pictures
- Budget: $1,000,000 AUD

Original release
- Network: ABC
- Release: May 10 – May 11, 1987

Queenie is a 1987 ABC miniseries based on the eponymous 1985 novel by writer and producer Michael Korda. Winston Beard (a pseudonym for James Goldman) and April Smith adapted the novel for television, with Larry Peerce directing.

== Background ==
In April 1985 Korda published Queenie, a roman à clef about his aunt, actress Merle Oberon, who had married his uncle Alexander Korda. In May 1987, Queenie aired in two parts on ABC.

== Plot ==
Queenie Kelley (Oberon had been known earlier in life as "Queenie O'Brien" and "Queenie Thompson") is an extremely beautiful girl of Indian and Irish descent, fair enough to pass for white. Growing up in Calcutta, however, Queenie is made all too aware of her "chee-chee" (mixed) background by her enemies, specifically wealthy Prunella Rumsey.

One of Prunella's mother's lovers, however, is Queenie's uncle, Morgan Jones. When their affair is discovered by Sir Burton Rumsey, he fires Jones from his musician position at the cricket club. Queenie visits with Sir Burton to plead for her uncle's job back, but he does so under the condition Queenie sleeps with him. When she realizes that he has lied to her, she storms out of the mansion, but not before he falls over a balcony and falls to his death. Once at home, Queenie tells her mother and uncle what happened, Jones and Queenie depart for England. Lost in London, Queenie finds a career as a stripper. Later, she makes her way to Hollywood, where she is renamed Dawn Avalon. Avalon becomes one of the biggest stars in Hollywood.

During this time, Queenie deals with complicated relationships while trying to conceal her true identity and avoid jail due to the ongoing investigation of Rumsey's death.

== Cast ==
Actor	Role
Starring
Joss Ackland	Sir Burton Rumsey
Martin Balsam	Marty Rose
Claire Bloom	Vicky Kelley
Gary Cady	Lucien Chambrun
Kirk Douglas	David Konig
Joel Grey	Aaron Diamond
Leigh Lawson	Morgan Jones
Sarah Miles	Lady Sybil
Mia Sara	Queenie Kelley
Topol	Dimitri Goldner
Also starring
Serena Gordon	Prunella Rumsey
Rosalie Crutchley	Grandmother
Kate Emma Davies	Young Queenie Kelley
Albert Moses	Inspector Gopal
Abigail Painter	Young Prunella Rumsey
Ernest Clark	Sir Philip Wentworth

== Critical reception ==
The New York Times criticized the miniseries for not only being "absurd" but also being politically dated: "Even the details show an insensitivity no longer acceptable in today's global village. Why, for instance, when so many Indian actors have excelled in such productions as A Passage to India and The Jewel in the Crown, do we still have to find Indian characters played by British actors using dark makeup and a singsong accent?"
