= A Place to Grow =

- Written by: Merlin Miller; Sandy Dillbeck; Woody P. Snow
- Directed by: Merlin Miller
- Starring: Gary Morris; Tracy Kristofferson; John Beck; Nikki Dunaway; Wilford Brimley; Boxcar Willie
- Music by: Gary Morris; Nick Sibley
- Country of origin: United States
- Original language: English

Production
- Producer: Merlin Miller
- Cinematography: Peter Wolf
- Editor: Roger Jared
- Running time: 96 minutes (TV); 118 minutes (DVD)

Original release
- Release: June 13, 1998 (U.S. DVD)

A Place to Grow (aka Moissons du coeur, Les France French TV title) is a 1995 drama film written and directed by Merlin (Merle) Miller.

== Plot ==
Upon his brother's death, Matt Walker, a recording artist, returns to his hometown to sell the family farm. Upon returning home, Matt rekindles a relationship with his high school sweetheart, who is now married to the secretive Paul and lives next door. Matt is pressured to sell his family farm to a wealth developer, who is buying up property around town and putting local farmers out of business. Matt, who suspects foul play in his brother Scott’s death, attempts to find his murderer.

== Cast ==
- Gary Morris as Matt Walker
- Tracy Kristofferson as Cheryl Shuler
- John Beck as Paul Shuler
- Nikki Dunaway as Laura Shuler
- Wilford Brimley as Jake
- Boxcar Willie as Carl Betz
- Woody P. Snow as Bill Carlson
- Ed Mosher as Pastor at the cemetery
- David C. Henry as behind the scenes cameraman
- David C. Henry Sr. as a walkby in the livestock show scene
- Max Lawmaster as a person in the restaurant scene
- Ed Marshall as Dan
- Sandy Lowe as Linda
- Marilyn Harper as Peg
- Gerry Cooney as 4H judge
- Juice Newton as Centennial Singer
- Steve Wariner as Centennial Singer
- John Hornsby as Centennial Singer
- R.J. Burns as Scott Walker
- Michelle Tennis as Michelle

== Soundtracks ==
- "A Place to Grow", written by Steve Wariner, performed by Gary Morris, courtesy of Steve Wariner Music (BMI)
- "Where Were You?", written by Gary Morris and Jeff Rea, performed by Gary Morris and Juice Newton, courtesy of Logrhythm Music (BMI)
- "Big Ole Black Guitar", written by Chuck Glass, Jim Glass, and Mike Lamb, performed by John Hornsby, courtesy of Logrhythm Music (BMI)
- "Empty", written by Gary Morris and Jeff Rea, performed by Gary Morris, courtesy of Logrhythm Music (BMI)
- "Symptoms of Love", written by Jon McElroy and Craig Karp, performed by Juice Newton, courtesy of Logrhythm Music (BMI)
- "A Month of Blue Mondays", written by Craig Karp and Dave Gibson, performed by Steve Wariner, courtesy of Logrhythm Music (BMI)
- "The Land", written by Jeff Rea and Jon McElroy, performed by Marty Raybon, courtesy of Logrhythm Music (BMI)
- "Laura's Song", written by Dottie Moore and Jeff Rea, performed by Gary Morris, courtesy of Logrhythm Music (BMI)
- "Amazing Grace", arranged and performed by Gary Morris
- "The Window", written by Jon McElroy and Stan Munsey, Jr., performed by Gary Morris, courtesy of Logrhythm Music (BMI) and Royalhaven Music, Inc. (BMI)
- "Back on the Tractor", written by Jon McElroy and Tony Mullins, performed by Matt King, courtesy of Logrhythm Music (BMI) and G.I.D. Music, Inc. (ASCAP)
- "Never Did Say Goodbye", written by Jeff Black, performed by Lisa Brokop, courtesy of Warner-Tamberlane Publishing Corp.
- "Bidding America Goodbye", written by Jamie O'Hara, performed by Tanya Tucker, courtesy of Sony Songs, Inc./Eiffel Tower Music (BMI)
- "For Your Love", written by Joe Ely, performed by Chris LeDoux, courtesy of Sony Songs, Inc./Eiffel Tower Music (BMI)
