= Mia Sara =

American actress (born 1967)

- Born: Mia Sarapochiello; June 19, 1967 (age 59); New York, New York, U.S.
- Occupation: Actress
- Years active: 1983–2013; 2023–present
- Spouses: Jason Connery (m. 1996; div. 2002) Brian Henson (m. 2010)
- Children: 2

Mia Sarapochiello (born June 19, 1967), known professionally as Mia Sara, is an American actress. Her early roles include the soap opera All My Children (1983) and Ridley Scott's fantasy film Legend (1985). She gained wide recognition for starring in John Hughes's comedy film Ferris Bueller's Day Off (1986). She then led the miniseries Queenie (1987) and won a Saturn Award for starring in Peter Hyams's science fiction film Timecop (1994).

Sara played Dr. Harleen Quinzel / Harley Quinn in the DC series Birds of Prey (2002–2003). She took a hiatus in 2013, and returned with a role in Mike Flanagan's drama film The Life of Chuck (2024).

== Early life ==
Sara was born to a Catholic Italian-American family in Brooklyn Heights, Brooklyn, New York. She is the daughter of Diana, a stylist and photographer, and Jerome Sarapochiello, a photographer and artist. She attended St. Ann's School, in Brooklyn.

== Career ==
Sara's debut role was Princess Lili in Ridley Scott's 1985 fairy-tale film Legend, alongside Tom Cruise. Playing the role of Ferris Bueller's girlfriend, Sloane Peterson, in the 1986 blockbuster film Ferris Bueller's Day Off made her even more popular. She also appeared in the 1987 miniseries Queenie, a roman à clef on actress Merle Oberon, as well as 1992's A Stranger Among Us, directed by Sidney Lumet.

In 1994, she starred opposite Jean-Claude Van Damme in the blockbuster Timecop, for which she won the Saturn Award for Best Supporting Actress. She also played the part of Molly Connor in The Impossible Elephant (2001). Also in 2001, she acted in Jack and the Beanstalk: The Real Story, directed by Brian Henson (eldest son of Muppets creator Jim Henson).

Her television roles have included Annie Knox in the science fiction series Time Trax (1993–94) and Dr. Harleen Quinzel in the short-lived WB Network series Birds of Prey (2002–03).

In 2024, Sara appeared in The Life of Chuck; this was her first film appearance since 2013.

== Personal life ==
In March 1996, Sara married Jason Connery, son of actor Sean Connery, with whom she performed in Bullet to Beijing. In June 1997 she gave birth to a son. The couple divorced in 2002. In 2005, Sara had a daughter with Brian Henson. They married in 2010. They currently reside in Suffolk, England.

In a July 2026 interview, Sara stated that she still lives in Los Angeles after 30 years primarily to ride her horses.

Sara is an avid poet.

== Filmography ==
=== Films ===
Year	Title	Role	Notes
1985	Legend	Princess Lili	
1986	Ferris Bueller's Day Off	Sloane Peterson	
1988	Apprentice to Murder	Alice Spangler	
1988	Shadows in the Storm	Melanie	
1990	Any Man's Death	Gerlind	
1991	A Climate for Killing	Elise Shipp	
1991	By the Sword	Erin Clavelli	
1992	A Stranger Among Us	Leah	
1993	Call of The Wild	Jessie Gosselin	
1994	Caroline at Midnight	Victoria Dillon	
1994	Timecop	Melissa Walker	
1995	The Set Up	Gina Sands	
1995	The Pompatus of Love	Cynthia	
1995	Black Day Blue Night	Hallie Schrag	
1996	The Maddening	Cassie Osborne	
1996	Undertow	Willie Yates	
1999	Dazzle	Miss Martinet	
2000	Little Insects	Princess Dayzie (voice)	
2001	The Impossible Elephant	Molly Connor	
2002	Turn of Faith	Annmarie De Carlo	
2003	Hoodlum & Son	Ellen Heaven	
2012	Dorothy and the Witches of Oz	Princess Langwidere	
2013	Pretty Pretty	Narciss	Short film
2024	The Life of Chuck	Sarah Krantz	

=== Television ===
Year	Title	Role	Notes
1983	All My Children	Francesca	Soap opera
1987	Queenie	Queenie Kelly / Dawn Avalon	Miniseries; lead role
1988	Alfred Hitchcock Presents	Sara Fletcher	Episode: "Twisted Sisters"
1989	Big Time	Fran	Television film
1989	Till We Meet Again	Delphine de Lancel	Miniseries
1990	Daughter of Darkness	Katherine Thatcher	Television film
1992	Call of the Wild	Jessie Gosselin	Television film
1993	Blindsided	Chandler Strange	Television film
1993	Time Trax	Elyssa Channing-Knox / Annie Knox	Episodes: "A Stranger in Time", "To Kill a Billionaire"
1995	Bullet to Beijing	Natasha	Television film
1995–1996	Chicago Hope	Annie Rueman	Episodes: "Informed Consent", "Women on the Verge"
1996	Strangers	Ginny	Episode: "Stone Heart"
1996	Midnight in Saint Petersburg	Natasha	Television film
1996	Undertow	Willie Yates	Television film
1997	20,000 Leagues Under the Sea	Mara	Miniseries; main role
1998	Hard Time	Myler	Television film
2001	Jack and the Beanstalk: The Real Story	Ondine	Miniseries; main role
2002	Lost in Oz	Loriellidere	Unsold pilot
2002–2003	Birds of Prey	Dr. Harleen Quinzel / Harley Quinn	Main role
2005	CSI: NY	Cala Winger	Episode: "Jamalot"
2006	Nightmares & Dreamscapes: From the Stories of Stephen King	Beautiful Passenger	Cameo; episode: "Battleground"
2007	Tinseltown	Lena	Television film

== Awards and nominations ==
Year	Award	Category	Work	Result	Ref.
1995	Saturn Awards	Best Supporting Actress	Timecop	Won	
