= Birds of Prey (TV series) =

2002 American superhero television series

- Genre: Action; Drama; Superhero
- Based on: Birds of Prey by Jordan B. Gorfinkel and Chuck Dixon
- Developed by: Laeta Kalogridis
- Starring: Ashley Scott; Dina Meyer; Rachel Skarsten; Shemar Moore; Ian Abercrombie; Mia Sara
- Opening theme: "Revolution" by Aimee Allen / "My Remedy"
- Composer: Mark Snow
- Country of origin: United States
- Original language: English
- No. of seasons: 1
- No. of episodes: 13

Production
- Executive producers: Michael Tollin; Brian Robbins; Joe Davola
- Production location: Los Angeles
- Running time: 39–47 minutes
- Production companies: Flash Film Works (pilot); Tollin/Robbins Productions; Warner Bros. Television

Original release
- Network: The WB
- Release: October 9, 2002 – February 19, 2003

Birds of Prey is an American superhero television series that was developed by Laeta Kalogridis. The series aired on The WB from October 9, 2002 to February 19, 2003 and is loosely based on the DC Comics series of the same name. The series takes place in a Gotham City abandoned by Batman.

The initial trailers for the series and its opening credits used footage of Michael Keaton (as Bruce Wayne / Batman) and Michelle Pfeiffer (as Selina Kyle / Catwoman) from Batman Returns. The suits from the Tim Burton and Joel Schumacher Batman films were used (albeit repainted) in the series. Additionally, artwork featuring the Burton incarnations of Batman and Catwoman was commissioned to promote the series as a TV Guide cover, but ultimately went unused, as the show was cancelled before the artist finished the piece.

The series debut garnered ratings of 7.6 million viewers (at the time, the network's largest premiere in the 18–34 demographic), but the series was canceled after ratings fell sharply in subsequent weeks. Thirteen episodes were produced and aired in total.

== Synopsis ==
The series is set in New Gotham City, several years after it has been apparently abandoned by Batman. In his absence, Oracle (Barbara Gordon) and the Huntress (Helena Kyle) have taken over his war on crime. The two are joined by Dinah Redmond (Black Canary), a telepath (after she assists them in defeating Larry Ketterly); Alfred Pennyworth, who serves Helena as she is heiress to the Wayne estate; and Detective Jesse Reese, a police officer confronted with crimes and abilities he cannot explain.

A central feature of the series is the concept of metahumans: individuals born with powers that cannot be explained. No two metahumans have the same abilities (unless hereditary), and there exists a whole subculture of metahuman society that the outside world knows nothing about.

Detective Reese reluctantly teams up with Huntress and the other Birds of Prey to defeat metahuman criminals. At first, he disapproves of Helena's vigilantism, even trying to arrest her, but eventually he realizes there is a need for the Birds of Prey to take down criminals the police cannot handle.

During the course of the show, the Birds of Prey often confront schemes masterminded by Dr. Harleen Quinzel (Harley Quinn), though they are unaware of her involvement until the final episode of the series. Quinzel's attempts to discover what Helena is hiding, and the duplicitous nature of their therapy sessions together, form a large part of the series arc, beginning in the pilot episode and being resolved in the series finale.

== Characters ==
=== Main ===
The main cast, featured in a publicity still for the series' run. From left to right, Dinah (Skarsten), Barbara (Meyer), and Helena (Scott). Not pictured are Jesse (Moore), Alfred (Abercrombie), and Harleen (Sara).

- Ashley Scott as Helena Kyle / Huntress
  The daughter of Batman and Catwoman. She is half-metahuman, with cat-like abilities inherited from her mother (also a metahuman in the Birds of Prey continuity): enhanced agility, strength, healing and a sixth sense for danger, as well as the ability to shift her eyes to a feline form. This change is usually triggered by strong emotion, but can also be used to grant Helena enhanced night vision. She was raised by her mother without ever knowing who her father was until the night Catwoman was murdered in cold blood on the street, right in front of her by an unknown assassin hired by the Joker (eventually revealed to be Clayface). After this, she was taken in by Barbara Gordon, who raised and trained her.
- Dina Meyer as Barbara Gordon / Batgirl / Oracle
  By day, Barbara is a teacher at New Gotham High, but, by night, she fights crime from a secret location in the New Gotham Clocktower. Originally one of Batman's apprentices and the daughter of his trusted ally Police Commissioner James Gordon, Barbara was shot by the Joker as revenge for Batman's dismantling of his criminal operation, leaving her paralyzed and forced to give up her life as Batgirl. She began using her expertise in computer hacking and weaponry to fight crime and renamed herself the Oracle. She maintains her superhero contacts and calls upon Huntress to handle the field work she is no longer capable of doing. Barbara works to develop a cybernetic implant for her spine in the hope that one day she will regain her mobility.
- Rachel Skarsten as Dinah Lance-Redmond
  Also a metahuman, Dinah is drawn to New Gotham and to Helena and Barbara by visions of the tragedies that befell them on the night of the Joker's revenge. She proves herself to the two and is taken in as a member of their team, with the condition that she train in the use of her metahuman abilities. In addition to her precognitive dreams, Dinah is a touch-telepath, able to read the thoughts of anyone she comes in physical contact with and later manifests the power of telekinesis. During the course of the series, Dinah discovers that her mother is actually Carolyn Lance, the Black Canary, also a metahuman and legendary superhero, who gave Dinah up for her own safety when she was a child after she did not display any metahuman potential. Unbeknownst to Carolyn, Dinah's abilities manifested while in the care of her foster parents, who reacted with fear and physical abuse towards the young Dinah. This prompted her to run away, where she was found by Barbara Gordon. The discovery of Dinah's relation to the Black Canary leads Oracle to believe that she may also have inherited her mother's hypersonic ability, although it is never demonstrated. Under Barbara and Helena's tutelage, Dinah becomes a skilled combatant, and by the end of the series, dons a black trench coat outfit nodding to Helena and her mother's identities.
- Shemar Moore as Detective Jesse Reese-Hawke
  An honest police detective who encounters Huntress while investigating a rash of bizarre suicides, Jesse is simultaneously drawn to her and disapproves of her disrespect for the law. Nevertheless, the two are thrown together by cases involving metahuman abilities. Reese's birth name was revealed as Jesse Hawke, and his father is Al Hawke, head of a powerful crime family and sworn enemy of Carolyn Lance, Dinah's mother. When he turned 16, after nearly being arrested when a police officer found traces of blood all over the trunk of his father's car while he was driving it, Jesse's relationship with his father became estranged. He forsook the name "Hawke", took his mother's surname, and dedicated his life to finding justice for his father's victims. He pursued a career in law enforcement to atone for his family's sins. Reese and Helena ultimately bond romantically towards the end of the series.
- Ian Abercrombie as Alfred Pennyworth
  Faithful butler to the Wayne family, Alfred transferred his services to Helena and Barbara in Batman's absence, and is often present at the clock tower, taking care of their day-to-day needs. He shares a close bond with Barbara, often listening to her problems or giving her advice on personal situations, whether she wants to hear it or not. He secretly remains in contact with Batman, updating him on the status of the Birds, in particular, that of Helena.
- Mia Sara (Note: Sherilyn Fenn portrayed Harley Quinn in the original unaired pilot for Birds of Prey.) as Dr. Harleen Quinzel / Harley Quinn
  A psychiatrist Helena is ordered to see after being convicted of vandalism while chasing a thief. Harley Quinn was Joker's lover and accomplice prior to his incarceration, unbeknownst to Helena and the other Birds of Prey, and has come to seek her revenge on New Gotham for what it did to her 'Mr J'. Though she presents herself as a respectable professional, once called upon by the authorities to work with violent and dangerous felons, Harleen Quinzel is herself insane, using her contacts with the criminal world to mastermind her revenge.

=== Recurring ===
- Shawn Christian as Wade Brixton
  The guidance counselor at New Gotham High. He and Barbara meet in the pilot and subsequently begin a relationship.
- Brent Sexton as Detective McNally
  A New Gotham detective and partner of Jesse Reese. He is skeptical of all things strange and unexplainable. He first appears in the pilot.
- Rob Benedict as Gibson Kafka
  A metahuman with perfect photographic memory. He can recall every taste, sight, sound and smell he has ever experienced (since before birth) and knows, to the second, the amount of time that has passed since he last saw someone. He is the proprietor of No Man's Land, a bar and safe house for metahumans. He first appears in the third episode, "Prey for the Hunter".

== Episodes ==
No.	Title	Directed by	Written by	Original release date	Prod. code	U.S. viewers (millions)
1	"Pilot"	Brian Robbins	Laeta Kalogridis	October 9, 2002	475179	7.55
Batman legend takes an unexpected turn when the Caped Crusader vanishes from the crime-ridden Gotham City and his legacy is taken over by a trio of relentless heroines—the Birds of Prey. Barbara Gordon (Dina Meyer) started out as Batman's protégé, Batgirl, but an attack by The Joker (played by Roger Stoneburner, voiced by Mark Hamill) left her a paraplegic after being shot in the spine. Reinventing herself as Oracle, she takes under her wing Helena Kyle (Ashley Scott), the secret daughter of Batman (Alex Daniels) and Catwoman (Casey Elizabeth Easlick), who quickly grows into the fierce "Huntress". Into this group comes Dinah Lance (Rachel Skarsten), a teenage runaway who is drawn to the city by metahuman visions. With the help of the only honest cop in the city now called New Gotham, Detective Jesse Reese (Shemar Moore), the Birds of Prey fight their first battle against a mysterious madman, Larry Ketterly (Chris Ellis), who is bent on destruction.
2	"Slick"	Michael Katleman	Story by : Laeta Kalogridis & Melissa Rosenberg; Teleplay by : Laeta Kalogridis	October 16, 2002	175451	5.10
Slick (Silas Weir Mitchell), an evil metahuman who can turn from solid to liquid, is hired by Dr. Harleen Quinzel (Mia Sara) to kill the honest cops who stand in her way. When Jesse Reese is the next intended victim, Helena Kyle comes to his aid and their mutual attraction continues to grow. Meanwhile, Barbara believes Dinah Lance's story that she is just a runaway, but Helena becomes suspicious.
3	"Prey for the Hunter"	Chris Long	Story by : Adam Armus & Kay Foster; Teleplay by : Edward Kitsis & Adam Horowitz	October 23, 2002	175452	4.54
Helena Kyle and Detective Jesse Reese clash again when they both try to track down a serial killer, Claude Morton (Joe Flanigan) who destroys metahumans by taking on their powers. Meanwhile, Dinah Lance ditches school when she learns from Helena there is a metahuman-only bar, and Barbara Gordon meets Wade Brixton's parents who think she is not normal enough for their son. Absent: Ian Abercrombie as Alfred Pennyworth and Mia Sara as Dr. Harleen Quinzel / Harley Quinn
4	"Three Birds and a Baby"	Craig Zisk	David H. Goodman & Julie Hess	October 30, 2002	175453	3.77
When Helena Kyle rescues an abandoned baby boy and brings him back to the Clocktower, Barbara Gordon and Dinah Lace try to help, but to everyone's surprise, the baby, "Guy", is only happy when Helena is holding him. Even more surprising is the fact that Guy wakes up from his nap as a walking, talking 5-year-old and is soon a teenager. Now in a race against time, the Birds of Prey discover that Guy is programmed to live his entire life in three days, and to kill the first person he attaches to, putting Helena in grave danger while Dr. Harleen Quinzel also races the clock to find Guy for her own nefarious plans.
5	"Sins of the Mother"	Jeff Woolnough	Story by : Melissa Rosenberg & Hans Tobeason; Teleplay by : Melissa Rosenberg	November 6, 2002	175454	4.58
Dinah Lance's mother, Carolyn (Lori Loughlin), comes to town to find her daughter, but the past comes back to haunt both women when the head of a crime family that Carolyn took down in her years as the Black Canary comes after them. Dinah must fight to save the mother she has never really known before she loses the chance completely. Helena Kyle wonders about her own mother's past, and about the secrets that the Canary could reveal to her, while Barbara tries to bring all the women together to cooperate before the past destroys them all. Absent: Ian Abercrombie as Alfred Pennyworth and Mia Sara as Dr. Harleen Quinzel / Harley Quinn
6	"Primal Scream"	Jim Charleston	Story by : Adam Armus & Kay Foster; Teleplay by : Edward Kitsis & Adam Horowitz	November 13, 2002	175455	
At the request of Jesse Reese, Helena Kyle goes undercover to help bring down a gang of thieves terrorizing New Gotham and quickly discovers that the gang is part of a larger infrastructure. Helena goes after the big boss until her cover is blown, putting her in grave danger. Meanwhile, Barbara Gordon has to deal with her fear of intimacy when her relationship with Wade Brixton takes a serious turn.
7	"Split"	James Marshall	Story by : Adam Armus & Kay Foster; Teleplay by : Edward Kitsis & Adam Horowitz	November 20, 2002	175456	4.48
Already frustrated with men thanks to her relationship with Det. Jesse Reese, Helena Kyle is none too pleased when a metahuman calling himself Darkstrike (Kristoffer Polaha) visits New Gotham to team up with her and Barbara Gordon. However, Helena warms to the enigmatic stranger when he explains his history with the Crawler (Brian Thompson)—a nefarious criminal with the nasty habit of murdering his abductees. When the fiend kidnaps an innocent teen, the crime fighters must race against the clock to ensure that the latest victim does not meet the fate of her predecessors. Absent: Ian Abercrombie as Alfred Pennyworth
8	"Lady Shiva"	John Kretchmer	Story by : Adam Armus & Kay Foster; Teleplay by : Edward Kitsis & Adam Horowitz	November 27, 2002	175457	4.02
Helena Kyle is thrilled when her best friend from high school, Sandra (Sung-Hi Lee), returns to New Gotham, but the Birds are troubled by a series of murders with the unmistakable mark of Batgirl's nemesis, Lady Shiva. Determined to fight Lady Shiva as an equal, Barbara Gordon dusts off her Batgirl costume and experiments with technology that allows her to leave the wheelchair. Meanwhile, Dinah Lance tries to use her mind-reading powers to get a boy at her school to notice her to ask her out for the school's spring dance. Absent: Mia Sara as Dr. Harleen Quinzel / Harley Quinn
9	"Nature of the Beast"	Shawn Levy	Melissa Rosenberg	December 18, 2002	175458	2.94
When a hit is put on the life of legendary mob boss, Al Hawke (Mitch Pileggi), the only person he trusts to protect him is his son, Det. Jesse Reese. Reese turns to Helena Kyle for help, but when she learns that Reese's father is the same man who killed Dinah Lance's mother, Black Canary, her loyalties are tested. Absent: Ian Abercrombie as Alfred Pennyworth and Mia Sara as Dr. Harleen Quinzel / Harley Quinn
10	"Gladiatrix"	David Carson	David H. Goodman	January 8, 2003	175459	3.26
When young metahuman women are abducted in New Gotham, Helena Kyle's investigation leads her to uncover a secret club where the captive women are drugged and forced to fight each other in an arena. When Helena is also abducted, it is up to Dinah Lance to rescue her with Jesse Reese's help. Absent: Mia Sara as Dr. Harleen Quinzel / Harley Quinn
11	"Reunion"	Chris Long	Edward Kitsis & Adam Horowitz	January 8, 2003	175460	3.08
When Helena Kyle's former classmates descend upon New Gotham for their five-year high school reunion, two of the alums are brutally murdered. While Helena tries to find the killer, Cam Anderson (J.P. Manoux), she fears that Jesse Reese's investigation will lead him to learn too much about her true identity. Absent: Mia Sara as Dr. Harleen Quinzel / Harley Quinn
12	"Feat of Clay"	Joe Napolitano	Adam Armus & Kay Foster	February 19, 2003	175461	2.91
After a robber, Chris Cassius (Ian Reed Kesler), breaks into a chemical factory and drinks a mixture that gives him the power to turn people to clay statues, Barbara Gordon cancels her vacation with her boyfriend, Wade. Unwilling to allow Barbara to continue neglecting her personal life, Alfred the Butler brings Wade to the clock tower and exposes her secret. Meanwhile, Helena Kyle goes to Arkham Asylum and interrogates her father's old enemy Clayface (Kirk Baltz), who possesses the same abilities as Chris, and learns a shocking fact about her past, The Joker hired Clayface to kill her mother while impersonating a mugger. She must race to prevent Chris from killing New Gotham's most powerful people at a charity fashion show.
13	"Devil's Eyes"	Robert J. Wilson	Adam Armus & Melissa Rosenberg	February 19, 2003	175462	2.91
Having discovered that Helena Kyle is Huntress, Harley Quinn (Dr. Harleen Quinzel) uses a machine that gives her metahuman hypnotic powers. She then hypnotizes Helena and persuades her to knock Barbara Gordon unconscious and steal an access disk. Barbara recovers and uses her subneural device to enable her to stand and fight Helena Kyle, eventually neutralizing the trance. But Harley uses the disk to gain complete control of the clock tower and, after killing Wade, she broadcasts the hypnotic signal to every television set in New Gotham. Working together with Alfred Pennyworth, Dinah Lance, and Jesse Reese, Helena must infiltrate the clock tower and battle Harley and her cohorts before they gain control of the entire city. It is hinted that Batman (Bruce Wayne) is probably still alive, as just before the end credits, Alfred speaks to "Master Bruce" on the phone at Wayne Manor, talking about his daughter Helena and that he would be proud of her.

== Reception ==
On Rotten Tomatoes the show has a 52% rating based on reviews from 25 critics.

== Home media ==
Birds of Prey was released on Region 1 DVD on July 15, 2008. The four-disc collection includes the thirteen episodes that were broadcast plus the unaired pilot, which features Sherilyn Fenn as Harley Quinn, and all three seasons of the Flash-animated series Gotham Girls. The episodes are presented in letterboxed widescreen format. Some music differs from the original televised version including the theme song ("My Remedy"), which in the original airing was "Revolution" by Aimee Allen, as well as additional songs such as "Harder to Breathe" by Maroon 5 in the second episode, and the fight music "All the Things She Said" by t.A.T.u. in the final episode which was replaced with "Beautiful Freak" by Dirty Children.

== Arrowverse ==
Ashley Scott reprises her role as Helena Kyle for the Arrowverse crossover event "Crisis on Infinite Earths", which retroactively establishes the world of Birds of Prey as Earth-203 before the Anti-Monitor (played by LaMonica Garrett) destroys it. Dina Meyer additionally reprises her role as Barbara Gordon, though only in an uncredited vocal capacity.

== See also ==
- Birds of Prey (2020 film)
