= Liberty Medical =

Home delivery service

Corporate logo

Liberty Medical Supply, Inc. ("Liberty Medical") was an American home delivery service that sold diabetes testing supplies, prescription drugs, urology supplies, and ostomy supplies directly to consumers. The company was a subsidiary of Medco Health Solutions, Inc., which purchased Liberty Medical and its parent company, PolyMedica, in 2007. After Express Scripts acquired Medco, they sold Liberty Medical in December 2012 to members of its management team, and it now operates again as an independent company. Liberty Medical's corporate headquarters is located in Port St. Lucie, Florida. As of 2012, the company was one of the city's largest employers, with as many as 2,432 employees. By the end of 2013, the company headquarters employed as few as 940 employees, adding to the community's jobless rate of over 9%, and implemented 20% pay cuts for all employees.

== Liberty Medical Services ==
Liberty Medical provides services to hundreds of thousands of patients through home delivery of their diabetes testing supplies, prescription medications, and other healthcare products that they need to manage their diabetes and related conditions. Since Liberty Medical offers free shipping, a free meter, and files insurance claims on the patient's behalf, in many cases the service results in no charge to the patient.

Liberty Medical has been expanding its product lines, offering a number of medical services and supplies in addition to diabetes testing supplies, such as prescription drugs, a personal emergency response system, sleep apnea equipment including CPAP masks, and ostomy and incontinence diabetes testing supplies.

== Advertising ==
They have featured veteran character actor Wilford Brimley, who had been the spokesman since 1999 (and a diabetic since 1979). Wilford Brimley was famously known for the slogan "Call Liberty, they can help you live a better life", as well as telling diabetics to "check your blood sugar, and check it often". Other celebrity diabetics who have done at least one commercial for the company include Nell Carter, Phylicia Rashad, and Delta Burke.

== In popular culture ==
Liberty Medical TV commercials have been parodied on Family Guy and Saturday Night Live. Since those parodies, YouTube users have created "mash-ups" of Liberty TV commercials featuring Wilford Brimley, garnering hundreds of thousands of views and creating an internet meme. Internet users have also posted pictures captioned "Diabeetus" in reference to Brimley's pronunciation of "diabetes".

== American Diabetes Association ==
Liberty Medical is a major contributor and National Strategic Partner of the American Diabetes Association (ADA), supporting the organization and its mission, "to prevent and cure diabetes and to improve the lives of all people affected by diabetes."

The company and the ADA collaborate in providing educational information to patients, including a campaign and series of articles called "I decide" that are published in Liberty's Health Matters magazine.

On December 19, 2008, Liberty Medical spokesman Wilford Brimley was recognized by the ADA for his advocacy efforts on behalf of diabetes awareness and education. The actor received the ADA's "Lifetime of Service" award during a ceremony at Liberty Medical headquarters in Port St. Lucie, Florida.

== Awards ==
Liberty Medical's former parent company, PolyMedica, was ranked sixth in the Boston Globe's "Globe 100" (Best of Massachusetts' Business) in May 2006. [14]

== Regulatory Affairs and Compliance ==
In 2001–2003, Polymedica Corp. and its subsidiary Liberty Medical Supply agreed to pay $35 million to resolve allegations that they submitted improper claims to Medicare for various diabetic and nebulizer products. Claims were allegedly submitted without a required doctor's order or prescription, and the companies failed to obtain and maintain documentation verifying the necessity of the level of treatment rendered. Under terms of the settlement, Polymedica agreed to comply with a corporate integrity agreement negotiated by HHS/OIG.

== Bankruptcy & Layoffs ==
On February 15, 2013, it was announced that Liberty Medical Supply had filed for Chapter 11 bankruptcy protection, citing assets and liabilities of between $100 million and $500 million in the United States Bankruptcy Court for the District of Delaware. In 2017, Liberty Medical laid off 263 employees from their Port St. Lucie Office.
