= A Climate for Killing =

- Official Poster
- Directed by: J. S. Cardone
- Written by: J.S. Cardone
- Produced by: Carol Kottenbrook
- Starring: John Beck; Katharine Ross; Steven Bauer
- Cinematography: Michael Cardone
- Music by: Robert Folk
- Production companies: Black Crow Productions; Propaganda Films
- Distributed by: Fox Video
- Release date: 18 July 1991
- Running time: 103 minutes
- Country: United States
- Language: English

A Climate for Killing (also known as A Row of Crows) is a 1991 American thriller-drama film written and directed by J. S. Cardone and starring John Beck, Katharine Ross, Steven Bauer and Mia Sara.

== Plot ==
Before a rodeo in Yuma, Arizona, a woman's body is found, presumed murdered by her wealthy husband sixteen years earlier, but the body's much fresher than that.

== Cast ==
- John Beck as Kyle Shipp
- Katharine Ross as Grace Hines
- Steven Bauer as Paul McGraw
- Mia Sara as Elise Shipp
- Phil Brock as "Click" Dunn
- Lu Leonard as Winnie
- Tony Frank as Sheriff Elmer Waters
- John Diehl as Wayne Paris
- Newell Alexander as Roy Paris
- Sherrie Rose as Rita Paris
- Dedee Pfeiffer as Donna
- Eloy Casados as Ruiz Sanchez
- Jack Dodson as Sam Moorehouse
- Cheryl Waters as Birdy
