= Wilford Brimley =

American actor (1934–2020)

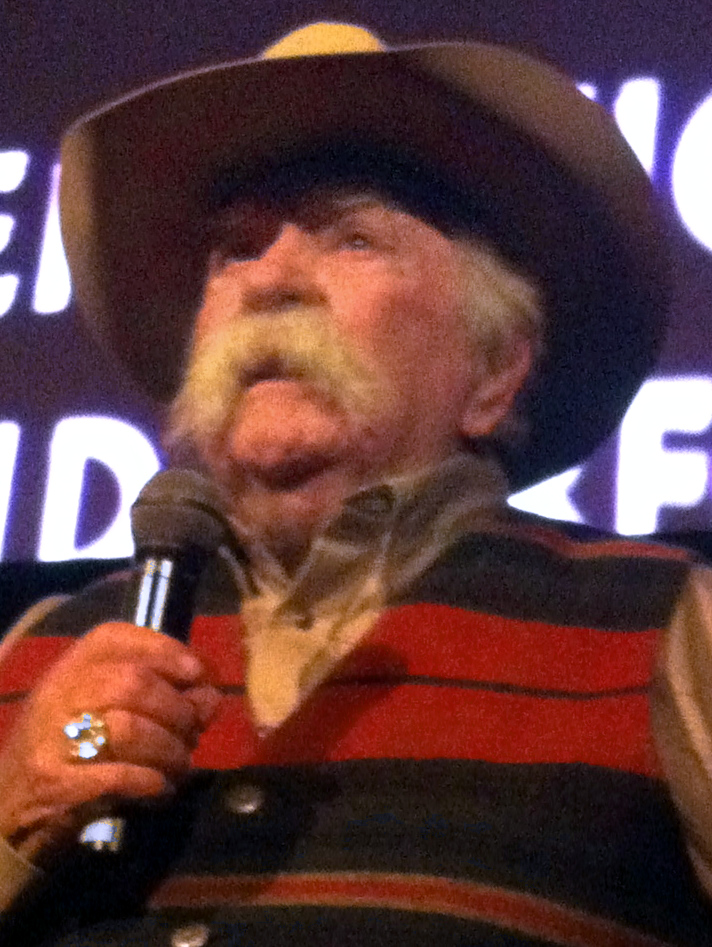
- Brimley in October 2012
- Born: Anthony Wilford Brimley; September 27, 1934; Salt Lake City, Utah, U.S.
- Died: August 1, 2020 (aged 85); St. George, Utah, U.S.
- Occupation: Actor
- Years active: 1967–2017
- Spouses: Lynne Bagley (m. 1956; died 2000) Beverly Berry (m. 2007)
- Children: 4
- Military career
- Allegiance: United States
- Branch: U.S. Marine Corps
- Service years: 1953–1956
- Rank: Sergeant
- Conflicts: Korean War

Anthony Wilford Brimley (September 27, 1934 – August 1, 2020) was an American actor. After serving in the U.S. Marine Corps and working odd jobs in the 1950s, Brimley started working as an extra and stuntman in Western films in the late 1960s. He became an established character actor in the 1970s and 1980s in films such as The China Syndrome (1979), The Thing (1982), Tender Mercies (1983), The Natural (1984), Cocoon (1985), and Cocoon: The Return (1988). Brimley was known for playing characters at times much older than his age. He was the long-term face of American television advertisements for the Quaker Oats Company. He also promoted diabetes education and appeared in related television commercials for Liberty Medical, a role for which he became an Internet meme.

== Early life ==
Anthony Wilford Brimley was born in Salt Lake City on September 27, 1934, the son of Lola (née Nelson) and real estate broker Wilford Brimley. His paternal grandfather was an Englishman from Wigan, while his paternal grandmother's parents were a Scottish couple from Glasgow. His mother was half Danish and also had English, German, Swiss, and Welsh ancestry. Prior to a career in acting, he dropped out of high school at age 14 and worked as a cowboy in Arizona, Idaho, and Nevada.

Brimley joined the Marines in 1953 and served in the Aleutian Islands for three years. He also worked as a bodyguard for businessman Howard Hughes as well as a ranch hand, wrangler, and blacksmith. He then began shoeing horses for film and television. At the behest of his close friend and fellow actor Robert Duvall, he began acting in the 1960s as a riding extra and stunt man in westerns. In 1979, he told the Los Angeles Times that the most he ever earned in a year as an actor was $20,000. He had no formal training as an actor, and his first experience in acting in front of a live audience was in a theater group at the Los Angeles Actors' Theater.

== Career ==
=== Film and television ===
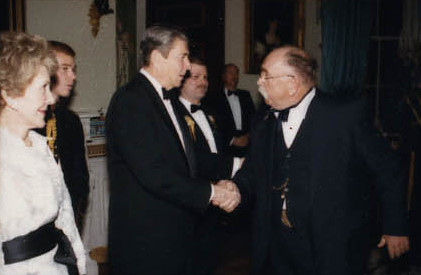
Brimley greeting U.S. President Ronald Reagan in 1988

Brimley's onscreen breakthrough came when he was cast in the popular 1970s television series The Waltons as Walton's Mountain resident and blacksmith Horace Brimley; he made seven appearances between 1974 and 1977.

His first credited feature film performance was in The China Syndrome (1979) as Ted Spindler, a friend and coworker of plant shift supervisor Jack Godell (portrayed by Jack Lemmon). That same year, he appeared in the Robert Redford/Jane Fonda feature film The Electric Horseman cast as simply "The Farmer" while assisting Redford and Fonda's characters evade troopers while transporting the horse in a cattle hauler. Later, Brimley made a brief but pivotal appearance in Absence of Malice (1981) as the curmudgeonly, outspoken Assistant Attorney General James A. Wells. In the movie The Thing (1982) he played the role of Blair, a biologist among a group of men at an American research station in Antarctica who encounter a dangerous alien that can perfectly imitate other organisms.

Brimley's close friend Robert Duvall (who also appeared in The Natural) was instrumental in securing for him the role of Harry in Tender Mercies (1983). Duvall, who had not been getting along with director Bruce Beresford, wanted "somebody down here that's on my side, somebody that I can relate to." Beresford felt Brimley was too old for the part but eventually agreed to the casting. Brimley, like Duvall, clashed with the director; during one instance when Beresford tried to advise Brimley on how Harry would behave, Duvall recalled Brimley responding: "Now look, let me tell you something, I'm Harry. Harry's not over there, Harry's not over here. Until you fire me or get another actor, I'm Harry, and whatever I do is fine 'cause I'm Harry."

Brimley then appeared as Pop Fisher, world-weary manager of a slumping baseball team, in The Natural (1984). Brimley appeared in the 1984 film Country as Otis, the patriarch of a family farm, which took a sobering look at farms in crisis in the 1980s. Shortly thereafter, Brimley secured his first leading role in Ron Howard's Cocoon (1985), portraying Ben Luckett, leader of a group of geriatrics who encounter a magically reinvigorating swimming pool by their retirement home. Brimley was only 49 when he was cast in the role, and turned 50 during filming; he was at least 20 years younger than any of the actors playing the other retirement home residents. In order to look the part, Brimley bleached his hair and moustache to turn them gray, and had wrinkles and liver spots drawn on his face. He also starred in Cocoon: The Return, a 1988 sequel.

Through these and other roles, Brimley became widely known for portraying gruff or stodgy old men, most notably on the 1980s NBC drama series Our House, also starring Deidre Hall, Chad Allen, and Shannen Doherty. One exception was when he played William Devasher, sinister head of security for a Mafia-associated law firm, in the Tom Cruise film The Firm (1993).

After portraying the father of Kevin Kline in In & Out (1997), Brimley retreated from Hollywood in favor of involvement in more independent productions. He made an auspicious mainstream comeback with the TNT film Crossfire Trail (2001), co-starring with Tom Selleck (with whom he had previously worked in the films High Road to China and In & Out). He played bank owner Burt Mueller in a 1995 episode of Walker, Texas Ranger ("War Zone"), and an intimidating United States Postmaster General in a 1997 episode of Seinfeld ("The Junk Mail"), who forces Kramer to end his boycott of the mail service. After several more years of independent film and TV acting, Brimley had a supporting role in Did You Hear About the Morgans? (2009), making witty exchanges with star Hugh Grant.

=== Commercials ===
Brimley frequently appeared in commercials, including a series of commercials for Quaker Oats, a campaign which became famous for his repeating their slogan "It's the right thing to do." Developed by advertising agency Jordan, McGrath, Case & Taylor, the campaign began in 1987. Brimley appeared in numerous television advertisements for Liberty Medical, a company specializing in home delivery of medical products (including diabetes testing supplies). He appeared in commercials for the American Diabetes Association and was the voice-over for a Bryan Foods television commercial campaign.

== Musical interests ==
Brimley has been described as "a fine singer with a warm, rich voice". In 1993, Brimley sang with the Cal State Northridge Jazz Band for a concert benefiting the college's Jazz Endowment Scholarship Fund. In 2004, he self-released the album This Time, The Dream's On Me a collection of jazz standards named after the title track. He was also an accomplished harmonica player; during his 2011 appearance on The Late Late Show with Craig Ferguson, Brimley performed a lively rendition of "Oh! Susanna" much to the delight, and surprise, of Ferguson and the studio audience. In 2013, Riders in the Sky partnered with Brimley to produce the album Home on the Range, which featured him singing a variety of country and folk songs.

== Personal life ==
Brimley was a member of the Church of Jesus Christ of Latter-day Saints. He was married to Lynne Bagley from July 6, 1956, until her death in June 2000. They had four sons together: James Charles, John Michael, William Carmen, and Lawrence Dean. He married Beverly Berry on October 31, 2007. They split their time between homes in Greybull, Wyoming, and Santa Clara, Utah. In 2009, they founded the nonprofit organization Hands Across the Saddle (HATS) in the Bighorn Basin.

Diagnosed with type 2 diabetes in 1979, Brimley began working to raise awareness of the disease. The American Diabetes Association (ADA) honored him in 2008 with an award to recognize his lifetime of service. The ADA presented the award to him at the Port St. Lucie headquarters of Liberty Medical on December 19, 2008. He visited Veterans Administration hospitals and communities to advise patients on how to manage their diseases. His television advertisements for Liberty Medical became an Internet meme due to Brimley's dialectal pronunciation of "diabetes", often rendered as "diabeetus" (/ˌdaɪəˈbiːtəs/), contrasting with his overall serious tone.

Brimley spoke against the banning of cockfighting in New Mexico on the basis of his support of individual rights. He also spoke at a 1998 Phoenix rally opposing an Arizona ballot proposition to ban cockfighting, arguing that a ban could lead to efforts to restrict the use of hunting dogs, which opponents of cockfighting called a distraction from the issue. Brimley enjoyed playing poker and played in the World Series of Poker Main Event.

Brimley lent his support to John McCain in the 2008 United States presidential election. In the days leading up to his selection of a running mate, McCain jokingly stated that he would pick Brimley: "He's a former Marine and great guy and he's older than I am, so that might work."

== Death ==
Brimley died at a hospital in St. George, Utah, on August 1, 2020, at age 85 after suffering from a kidney condition for two months.

== Filmography ==
=== Film ===
Year	Title	Role	Notes	Ref.
1968	Bandolero!	Stuntman	Uncredited	
1969	True Grit	Minor role	Uncredited	
1971	Lawman	Marc Corman	Uncredited	
1979	The China Syndrome	Ted Spindler		
1979	The Electric Horseman	Farmer		
1980	Brubaker	Rogers		
1980	Borderline	USBP Agent "Scooter" Jackson		
1981	Absence of Malice	Assistant U.S. Attorney General James A. Wells		
1982	Death Valley	The Sheriff		
1982	The Thing	Dr. Blair		
1983	Tender Mercies	Harry		
1983	10 to Midnight	Captain Malone		
1983	High Road to China	Bradley Tozer		
1983	Tough Enough	Bill Long		
1984	Harry & Son	Tom Keach		
1984	The Hotel New Hampshire	Bob "Iowa Bob"		
1984	The Stone Boy	George Jansen		
1984	The Natural	'Pop' Fisher		
1984	Country	Otis		
1984	Terror in the Aisles	Dr. Blair	Archival footage	
1985	Cocoon	Ben Luckett		
1985	Remo Williams: The Adventure Begins	CURE Director Harold W. Smith		
1986	Jackals	Sheriff Mitchell		
1986	Shadows on the Wall	Floyd Buckman		
1987	End of the Line	Will Haney		
1988	Cocoon: The Return	Ben Luckett		
1990	Eternity	King / Eric		
1992	Where the Red Fern Grows: Part II	Grandpa Will	Direct-to-video	
1993	The Firm	Bill Devasher		
1993	Hard Target	Uncle Clarence Douvee		
1994	Heaven Sent	Al (Security Guard)		
1995	Mutant Species	Devro		
1995	Last of the Dogmen	Narrator	Voice; Uncredited	
1996	My Fellow Americans	Joe Hollis		
1997	In & Out	Frank Brackett		
1997	Lunker Lake	The Storyteller		
1998	Chapter Perfect	Chief Hawkins		
1998	Progeny	Dr. David Wetherly		
1998	A Place to Grow	Jake		
1998	Summer of the Monkeys	Grandpa Sam Ferrans		
2000	Comanche	Doctor		
2001	Brigham City	Stu		
2001	PC and the Web	Unknown		
2002	Resurrection Mary	Morty		
2003	The Road Home	Coach Weaver		
2009	The Path of the Wind	Harry Caldwell		
2009	Did You Hear About the Morgans?	Earl Granger		
2016	Timber the Treasure Dog	"Hawk" Jones		
2017	I Believe	Pastor	Final film role	

=== Television ===
Year	Title	Role	Notes
1974–1977	The Waltons	Horace Brimley	10 episodes
1975	Kung Fu	Blacksmith	Episode: "One Step to Darkness"; as A. Wilford Brimley
1976–1977	The Oregon Trail	Ludlow	Episodes: Pilot, "Hard Ride Home"; as A. Wilford Brimley
1979	The Wild Wild West Revisited	Grover Cleveland	Television film; credited as Wilford A. Brimley
1980	Amber Waves	Pete Alberts	Television film
1980	Roughnecks	Willie Clayton	Television film
1980	Rodeo Girl	"Bingo" Gibbs	
1981	The Big Black Pill	Wally Haskell	Television film; AKA Joe Dancer
1985	Murder in Space	Dr. Andrew McCallister	Television film
1985	Ewoks: The Battle for Endor	Noa	Television film
1986	Thompson's Last Run	"Red" Haines	Television film
1986	Act of Vengeance	Tony Boyle	Television film
1986–1988	Our House	Gus Witherspoon	Main role
1989	Billy the Kid	Governor Lew Wallace	
1991	Blood River	US Marshal Winston Patrick Culler	
1992	The Boys of Twilight	Deputy Bill Huntoon	
1994	Homicide: Life on the Street	Harry Prentice	Season 2, Episode 1, "See No Evil"
1995	Walker, Texas Ranger	Burt Mueller	Episode: "War Zone"
1995	Op Center	Admiral Troy Davis	
1995	The Good Old Boys	C.C. Tarpley	Television film
1997	Seinfeld	US Postmaster General Henry Atkins	Episode: "The Junk Mail"
2001	Crossfire Trail	Joe Gill	Television film
2001	The Ballad of Lucy Whipple	Deputy Ambrose Scraggs	Television film
2011	The Late Late Show with Craig Ferguson	Guest (self)	Late night talk show

== Awards and nominations ==
Year	Award	Category	Nominated work	Result	Ref.
1987	CableACE Awards	Actor in a Movie or Miniseries	Act of Vengeance	Nominated	
2005	Golden Boot Awards	Golden Boot	—N/a	Won	
2013	Maverick Movie Awards	Best Supporting Actor: Short	Masque	Nominated	
