= J. T. Walsh =

American actor (1943–1998)

J.T. Walsh
- Walsh as Warren "Red" Barr in Breakdown (1997)
- Born: James Thomas Patrick Walsh; September 28, 1943; San Francisco, California, U.S.
- Died: February 27, 1998 (aged 54); La Mesa, California, U.S.
- Education: University of Rhode Island
- Occupation: Actor
- Years active: 1975–1998

James Thomas Patrick Walsh (September 28, 1943 – February 27, 1998) was an American character actor. He starred in many films of the 1980s and 1990s, which include Tin Men (1987), Good Morning, Vietnam (1987), A Few Good Men (1992), Hoffa (1992), Nixon (1995), Sling Blade (1996), Breakdown (1997) and Pleasantville (1998).

== Early life ==
Walsh was born in San Francisco, California. He had three siblings: Christopher, Patricia, and Mary.

After graduating from the University of Rhode Island in 1967, Walsh worked briefly as a VISTA volunteer in Newport, Rhode Island organizing tenants for the United Tenant Organizations of Rhode Island (UTO) before resigning to pursue his acting career. Prior to becoming an actor, he also worked as a barman, an encyclopedia salesman, a junior high school teacher, a gymnasium equipment salesman, and a reporter. In 1974, he was discovered by a theater director and began working in off-Broadway shows, where he began using the initials "J. T." to avoid confusion with another stage actor named James Walsh.

== Career ==
On stage, Walsh received critical acclaim for his performance as John Williamson in the 1984 U.S. premiere of David Mamet's Glengarry Glen Ross in Chicago and subsequently on Broadway. He first appeared in a film in 1983, a minor role in Eddie Macon's Run. Over the next 15 years, he appeared in over 50 feature films, increasingly taking the villain role for which he is well known, such as Sergeant Major Dickerson in Good Morning, Vietnam (1987). On television, he again portrayed an evil character, prison warden Brodeur on the 1995 X-Files episode "The List".

Among the films Walsh appeared in are Tin Men (1987), Misery (1990), Backdraft (1991), Sniper (1993), The Client (1994), Miracle on 34th Street (1994), Outbreak (1995), Executive Decision (1996), Sling Blade (1996), and he played the sympathetic Marine Lieutenant Colonel Matthew Markinson in A Few Good Men (1992). He played a member of Majestic 12 in the 1996 sci-fi drama series Dark Skies. Walsh notably played real people in three films: journalist Bob Woodward in Wired (1989), Teamsters president Frank Fitzsimmons in Hoffa (1992), and Richard Nixon's domestic advisor John Ehrlichman in Nixon (1995).

The 1997 thriller Breakdown, which featured Walsh as villainous truck driver Warren "Red" Barr, was his last starring film released during his lifetime. In his final year of life, Walsh starred in The Negotiator (1998), Pleasantville (1998), and Hidden Agenda (1999), all of which were dedicated to his memory.

== Personal life and death ==
Walsh died of a heart attack in the hospital in La Mesa, California, on February 27, 1998, at the age of 54, after feeling ill and collapsing at the Optimum Health Institute in Lemon Grove. According to author Marc Seifer, for whom Walsh had narrated a documentary a few weeks earlier, Walsh had experienced chest pains and had an EKG test done that resulted in a misdiagnosis.

Jack Nicholson, who acted with Walsh in A Few Good Men and Hoffa, dedicated his Best Actor Oscar for As Good as It Gets to him.

In his tribute to Walsh in Time Out New York, Andrew Johnston wrote:

Walsh is invariably referred to as a character actor who specialized in villains, but that description doesn't quite do justice to what he did. The typical Walsh character was a plot device, really, serving either as a moral counterpoint to the star of the show or as an Iagolike figure egging on the hero in a way likely to lead to the protagonists's downfall. These characters were often self-important authority figures 'defending' the American establishment from the individualism represented by the movies' heroes ... or crooks who thrived by exploiting the hypocrisy of the system. Walsh didn't just make a career of playing bad guys — his performances offered a sort of running commentary on the power structure of American society.

== Filmography ==
=== Film ===
| Year | Title | Role | Notes |
|---|---|---|---|
| 1983 | Eddie Macon's Run | Man in Bar | Film debut |
| 1984 | The Beniker Gang | Principal Stoddard | |
| 1985 | Right to Kill? | Major Eckworth | TV movie |
| 1985 | Hard Choices | Deputy Anderson | |
| 1986 | Hannah and Her Sisters | Ed Smythe | |
| 1986 | Power | Jerome Cade | |
| 1987 | Tin Men | Wing | |
| 1987 | House of Games | The Businessman / Cop | |
| 1987 | Good Morning, Vietnam | Sergeant Major Phillip Dickerson | |
| 1988 | Things Change | Hotel Manager | |
| 1988 | Tequila Sunrise | DEA Agent Hal Maguire | |
| 1989 | The Big Picture | Allen Habel | |
| 1989 | Wired | Bob Woodward | |
| 1989 | Dad | Dr. Santana | |
| 1990 | Why Me? | Chief Inspector Francis Mahoney | |
| 1990 | Crazy People | Mr. Charles F Drucker | |
| 1990 | The Grifters | Cole | |
| 1990 | Narrow Margin | Michael Tarlow | |
| 1990 | Misery | Chief Sherman Douglas | Uncredited |
| 1990 | The Russia House | Colonel Jackson Quinn | |
| 1991 | Iron Maze | Jack Ruhle | |
| 1991 | Backdraft | Alderman Marty Swayzak | |
| 1991 | Defenseless | Steven Seldes | |
| 1991 | True Identity | Agent Houston | |
| 1992 | A Few Good Men | Lieutenant Colonel Matthew Andrew Markinson | |
| 1992 | Hoffa | Frank Fitzsimmons | |
| 1992 | The Prom | Grover Dean | Short |
| 1993 | Sniper | Colonel Chester Van Damme | |
| 1993 | Loaded Weapon 1 | Desk Clerk | |
| 1993 | Red Rock West | Kevin McCord / Sheriff Wayne Brown | |
| 1993 | Needful Things | Danforth "Buster" Keeton III | |
| 1993 | Morning Glory | Sheriff Reese Goodloe | |
| 1993 | One Little Indian | Marshall Robinson | Short |
| 1994 | The Last Seduction | Frank Griffith | |
| 1994 | Blue Chips | "Happy" Kuykendahl | |
| 1994 | The Client | FBI Agent Jason McThune | |
| 1994 | Silent Fall | Sheriff Mitch Rivers | |
| 1994 | Miracle on 34th Street | Ed Collins | |
| 1995 | Outbreak | White House Chief of Staff | Uncredited |
| 1995 | The Low Life | Mike Sr. | |
| 1995 | The Babysitter | Harry Tucker | |
| 1995 | Black Day Blue Night | Lieutenant John Quinn | |
| 1995 | Charlie's Ghost Story | Darryl | |
| 1995 | Nixon | John Ehrlichman | |
| 1996 | Executive Decision | Senator Jason Mavros | |
| 1996 | The Little Death | Ted Hannon | |
| 1996 | Sacred Cargo | Father Stanislav | |
| 1996 | Sling Blade | Charles Bushman | |
| 1997 | Breakdown | Warren "Red" Barr | |
| 1998 | The Negotiator | Inspector Terence Niebaum | Posthumous release |
| 1998 | Pleasantville | Bob "Big Bob" | Posthumous release |
| 1999 | Hidden Agenda | Jonathan Zanuck | Posthumous release |

=== Television ===
| Year | Title | Role | Notes |
|---|---|---|---|
| 1983 | Blood Feud | Photographer | Television film |
| 1984 | The Edge of Night | Ken Bloom #2 | 9 Episodes |
| 1985 | All My Children | Jay Garland | 1 Episode |
| 1985 | The Equalizer | Sam Griffith | Episode: "The Lock Box" |
| 1987 | Spenser: For Hire | Andrew Lawford | Episode: "Murder and Acquisitions" |
| 1987 | The Ellen Burstyn Show | Dan Hodges | Episode: "Writer, Wronger" |
| 1987 | The Equalizer | Andrew Banks | Episode: "Shadow Play" |
| 1988 | Windmills of the Gods | Colonel Bill McKinney | TV Miniseries |
| 1989 | L.A. Law | Pete Bostik | Episode: "Consumed Innocent" |
| 1990 | Roseanne | Lieutenant Howard | Episode: "An Officer and a Gentleman" |
| 1992 | In the Shadow of a Killer | Inspector Leo Kemeny | TV movie |
| 1993 | The American Clock | Judge Bradley | TV film based on the play by Arthur Miller |
| 1994 | Birdland | Potter | Episode: "Grand Delusion" |
| 1994 | Lois & Clark: The New Adventures of Superman | Colonel Charles Fane | Episode: "Operation Blackout" |
| 1994 | Starstruck | Greer | TV movie |
| 1995 | The X Files | Warden Brodeur | Episode: "The List" |
| 1996 | Crime of the Century | Norman Schwarzkopf Sr. | TV movie |
| 1996 | Gang in Blue | Lieutenant William Eyler | TV movie |
| 1996–1997 | Dark Skies | Frank Bach | 19 Episodes |
| 1997 | Hope | Ray Percy | Goldie Hawn's directorial debut |
| 1997 | C-16: FBI | Jules Rozack | Episode: "Radio FBI" |
