= John Beck (actor) =

American actor

- Born: January 28, 1943 (age 83); Chicago, Illinois, U.S.
- Occupation: Actor
- Years active: 1965–2009

John Beck (born January 28, 1943) is an American retired actor, known best for his role as Mark Graison in the television series Dallas during the mid-1980s.

== Early life ==
Beck was born in Chicago, Illinois but he grew up in Evanston and Joliet on his father's ranch, with the goal of becoming a veterinarian. His goals changed at the age of sixteen after performing in a play in high school to overcome shyness. Three years later, Beck relocated to California and had jobs in television commercials. In 1963–1964, Beck attended Joliet Junior College but quit to begin acting in plays in other cities.

== Career ==
Beck's television debut was as a Sergeant in the 1965 episode "Russian Roulette" of the television series I Dream of Jeannie. His first regular role was for the television western series Nichols (1971-1972) alongside James Garner, playing the roles of Orv/Ketcham.

One of Beck's earliest movie roles was as Skinny in Cyborg 2087 (1966). Beck played Erno who commands a revolt against a totalitarian government in Woody Allen's science fiction comedy Sleeper (1973). That same year, he appeared as John W. Poe in the Sam Peckinpah western Pat Garrett and Billy the Kid. In 1975, he appeared opposite James Caan as Moonpie in the science-fiction film Rollerball. The following year he played Shoulders in the disaster movie spoof The Big Bus (1976). He had a leading role in The Other Side of Midnight (1977), which the critics condemned, but the movie was a financial success. Other movie credits include Audrey Rose (1977), Deadly Illusion (1987), In the Cold of the Night (1990), A Climate for Killing (1991), Last Time Out (1994), Black Day Blue Night (1995), Dark Planet (1997), A Place to Grow (1998), Chain of Command (2000), Crash Point Zero (2001), Timecop 2: The Berlin Decision (2003), and Crash Landing (2005).

Beck also had guest roles for television series and movies, one of the most popular being his 67-episode stint as Mark Graison on Dallas. Guest appearances include those for Baywatch, Bonanza, Death Valley Days, Diagnosis: Murder, Gunsmoke, Hawaii Five-O, Magnum, P.I., Mannix, Matlock, Mission: Impossible, The Mod Squad, Murder, She Wrote, Perry Mason: The Case of the Lady in the Lake, Star Trek: Deep Space Nine, Touched by an Angel, The Twilight Zone (1989), and Walker, Texas Ranger, among others.

Recurring soap opera roles include Dorian Blake in Peyton Place: The Next Generation, Sam Curtis in Flamingo Road, David Raymond in Santa Barbara, and Bruce in Passions.

As a voice actor, Beck played the role of the Punisher, Frank Castle in Spider-Man: The Animated Series.

== Personal life ==
On April 23, 1971, in Los Angeles, Beck married Valerie Shellibeer (also known by her stage name, Tina Carter). The couple had a son and three daughters.

== Filmography ==
A partial filmography follows.

=== Film ===
- Cyborg 2087 (1966) as Skinny
- A Good Time with a Bad Girl (1967) as Cowboy (uncredited)
- Three in the Attic (1968) as Jake
- Lawman (1971) as Jason Bronson
- Mrs. Pollifax-Spy (1971) as Lulash
- Pat Garrett and Billy the Kid (1973) as Poe
- Paperback Hero (1973) as Pov
- Sleeper (1973) as Erno Windt
- Only God Knows (1974) as Reverend Philip Norman
- Nightmare Honeymoon (1974) as Lee
- Rollerball (1975) as Moonpie
- The Big Bus (1976) as Shoulders
- Sky Riders (1976) as Ben
- Audrey Rose (1977) as Bill Templeton
- The Other Side of Midnight (1977) as Larry Douglas
- Deadly Illusion (1987) as Alex Burton
- In the Cold of the Night (1990) as Rudy
- A Climate for Killing (1991) as Kyle Shipp
- Star Trek VI: The Undiscovered Country (1991) as Waiter (uncredited)
- Last Time Out (1994) as Joe Dolan
- Black Day Blue Night (1995) as Chief Morris Reed
- Dark Planet (1997) as General
- A Place to Grow (1998) as Paul Shuler
- Chain of Command (2000) as General Peterson
- The Alternate (2000) as President Fallbrook
- Militia (2000) as Dep. Dir. Anderson
- Crash Point Zero (2001) as Dr. Maurice Hunter
- Timecop 2: The Berlin Decision (2003) as O'Rourke
- Crash Landing (2005) as General McClaren

=== Television ===
Year	Title	Role	Notes
1965	I Dream of Jeannie	Sergeant	"Russian Roulette'
1966	Days of Our Lives	Sam Wilson	
1969	Bonanza	Walt Nagel	"The Medal"
1969	Death Valley Days	Sandy Peters	"Solomon's Glory"
1969	Mannix	Jerry Boyes	"Color Her Missing"
1969	The Mod Squad	Bill	"A Seat by the Window"
1969	The Silent Gun	Billy Reed	TV Movie
1970	Bonanza	Luke Baldwin	"What Are Pardners For?"
1970	Gunsmoke	Albert Vail	"Kiowa"
1970	Lancer	Chad Buford	"Chad"
1970	Lancer	Chad Lancer	"Dream of Falcons"
1971	Gunsmoke	Moody Fowler	"The Tycoon"
1971	Lock, Stock and Barrel	Micah Brucker	TV Movie
1971	Mission: Impossible	John Hecker	"The Missile"
1971-1972	Nichols	Orv Ketcham	23 episodes
1974	Hawaii Five-O	Walter Stark	"Nightmare in Blue"
1974	Nourish the Beast	Bruno	TV Movie
1974	The Law	Gene Carey	TV Movie
1974	Sidekicks	Luke	TV Movie
1975	Attack on Terror: The FBI vs. the Ku Klux Klan	Rev. George Greg	TV Movie
1975	Gunsmoke	Mitch Hansen	"The Busters"
1976	The Call of the Wild	John Thornton	TV Movie
1978	Greatest Heroes of the Bible	Samson	"Samson and Delilah"
1978	The Time Machine	Neil Perry	TV Movie
1978	Wheels	Peter Flodenhale	TV Mini Series (episode 1)
1979	The Buffalo Soldiers	Col. Frank "Buckshot" O'Connor	TV Movie
1979	Time Express	Roy Culper	"Rodeo/Cop"
1980-1982	Flamingo Road	Sam Curtis	38 episodes
1980	The Great American Traffic Jam (aka Gridlock)	Buzz Gregory	TV Movie
1981	Tales of the Unexpected	Jack	"A Glowing Future"
1983-1986	Dallas	Mark Graison	67 Episodes
1985	Murder, She Wrote	Web McCord	"Sudden Death"
1985	Peyton Place: The Next Generation	Dorian Blake	TV Movie
1986	Crazy Dan	"Crazy" Dan Gatlin	TV Movie
1986	Matlock	Brad Bingham	The Seduction
1987	Magnum, P.I.	Edward T. Durant	"Limbo"
1988	Perry Mason: The Case of the Lady in the Lake	Doug Vickers	TV Movie
1989	Fire and Rain	Captain Edward Conners	TV Movie
1989	The Twilight Zone	Maj. Alex McAndrews	"The Wall"
1991	Murder, She Wrote	Ben Olston	"Thursday's Child"
1991-1992	Santa Barbara	David Raymond	114 Episodes
1993	Diagnosis: Murder	Detective Eugene Vickers	"Vanishing Act" (2 episodes)
1993	Trade Winds	Robert Philips	TV Mini Series (episodes 1–3)
1994	Baywatch	Buzz Buchannon	"Coronado del Soul" (2 episodes)
1994	Honor Thy Father and Mother: The True Story of the Menendez Murders	Detective Les Zoeller	TV Movie
1994	Matlock	Paul Cox	"The Idol"
1994	Star Trek: Deep Space Nine	Raymond Boone	"Tribunal"
1995	Hart to Hart: Secrets of the Hart	Captain Jeremy Daniels	TV Movie
1995	Spider-Man: The Animated Series	Punisher / Frank Castle (voice)	"Neogenic Nightmare" (2 episodes)
1995	Suspect Device	CIA Director	TV Movie
1995	Touched by an Angel	Captain Meyers	"Trust"
1996	Time Well Spent	Cal Clevenger	TV Movie
1996	Walker, Texas Ranger	Sergeant Lou Ross	"The Brotherhood"
1997	Spider-Man: The Animated Series	Punisher / Frank Castle (voice)	"Partners in Danger Chapter 8: The Return of the Green Goblin"
1997	Steel Chariots	Dale Tucker	TV Movie
1997	Walker, Texas Ranger	Max Elson	"Rainbow's End"
2000	Walker, Texas Ranger	Jake Foley	"Showdown at Casa Diablo: Part 1"
2001-2003	Passions	Bruce	22 episodes
2002	Project Viper	Simpkins	TV Movie
