= Barry Kivel =

American film director

- Occupations: Actor, film director, editor, producer

Barry Kivel is an American actor, director, editor, and producer who appeared in Crocodile Dundee (1986), Memoirs of an Invisible Man (1992), Coneheads (1993), Bound (1996), One Fine Day (1996), Body and Soul (2000), Turn of Faith (2001), and Q-4: Dream Corporation (2016), a futuristic thriller. To his credits, he has produced Three Sides (2011), a short film. As an editor, he also has edited Three Sides (2011). He also directed Three Sides. He received a special thanks for the 2016 documentary film The Natural: The Best There Ever Was, which is completed, and he has a role in there as Pat McGee and himself. In television he has acted on serial police drama Hill Street Blues, sitcom Full House, sitcom Who's the Boss?, sitcom Empty Nest, legal drama Civil Wars, sitcom Murphy Brown, legal drama Brooklyn South, television drama Judging Amy, and sitcom Scrubs.

== Film career ==
Kivel made his film debut in The Natural (1984), a baseball film about Roy Hobbs, showcasing the successes and sufferings of the player. He next appeared along with Timothy Hutton, Robert Urich, and Kim Cattrall in the drama film Turk 182! (1985). The next year he appeared in the comedy, Crocodile Dundee, as a Coke snorter. In 1991, he appeared along Sally Field, Robert Downey Jr., and Kevin Kline in the comedy film Soapdish. He then made two appearances in 1992 in film with Memoirs of an Invisible Man and a TV Movie Carol Leifer: Gaudy, Bawdy & Blue. In 1993, he appeared in Science fiction comedy film Coneheads as a doctor.

In 1994, he appeared in the comedy Attack of the 5 Ft. 2 Women. In 1996, he first appeared in neo-noir crime thriller Bound, which is about a woman wanting to escape her relationship with her mafioso boyfriend and enters a hidden affair with an charming ex-con. Later in the year, he played Mr. Yates Jr. in romantic comedy One Fine Day. He next appeared in 2000 in Body and Soul in boxing film as Willie, in a film about Charlie Davis, a determined small-town boxer who travels to Reno, Nevada and loses himself, and the people he cares for most. He next appeared in the 2002 film alongside Ray Mancini, Mia Sara, Costas Mandylor, and Alan Gelfant in Turn of Faith, which follows three friends who grow up in a tough neighborhood and they choose very different paths.

In 2005, he appeared in a short film as Marty Punion, one of the main stars. In 2011, he directed, produced, and filmed the short drama film Three Sides, about a young woman, who searches for her biological mother, forcing three people to reconsider their life choices. In 2016 he did a film called Q-4: Dream Corporation, a thriller about the government trying to run people's sleeping habits. He is also credited the baseball documentary The Natural: The Best There Ever Was.

== Filmography ==
=== Filmography ===
Year	Title	Role	Notes
1984	The Natural	Pat McGee	
1985	Turk 182!	Callahan the Cop	
1986	Crocodile Dundee	Coke Snorter	
1991	Soapdish	Nitwit Executive	
1992	Memoirs of an Invisible Man	Drunk Businessman	
1992	Carol Leifer: Gaudy, Bawdy & Blue	Principal	TV Movie
1993	Coneheads	Doctor	
1994	Attack of the 5 Ft. 2 Women	Doctor	
1996	Bound	Shelly	
1996	One Fine Day	Mr. Yates Sr.	
2000	Body and Soul	Willie	
2002	Turn of Faith	Tony Fusco	
2005	Still Life	Marty Punion	Short
2011	Three Sides	Director, Editor, Film Producer	
2016	Tond	Men's Mission Friend	Short
2016	Q-4: Dream Corporation	Captain Pisano	Post-production
2016	The Natural: The Best There Ever Was	Pat McGee and Himself	Documentary (completed)

=== Television ===
Year	Film	Role	Notes
1985	The Steel Collar Man	Attendant	TV special
1985	Hill Street Blues	Artie Neems	
1990	Full House	Michael Kagan	
1990	Who's the Boss?	Jake	
1991	Dream On	Ricky	
1992	Sisters	Fisherman Floyd	
1992	Empty Nest	Dr. Grossman	
1992	Star Trek: The Next Generation	Doorman	
1992	Civil Wars	Aaron Gutbaum	
1993	L.A. Law	Mr. Gaffney	
1995	Murder One	Stan Lerman	
1997	Murphy Brown	Stan	
1998	Brooklyn South	Barry Neely	
1998	The Tony Danza Show	Mr. Ho Ho	
2002	Judging Amy	Mr. Taylor's Attorney	
2003	Scrubs	Mr. Hilliard	
