= Catterall (surname) =

Catterall (also spelled Catherall) is a surname originating from the place name Catterall in Lancashire, England. The place name is thought to be of Old Scandinavian origin meaning "a cat's tail", the origin of the Norwegian place name Katralen (formerly Katterall), although it may be from Old English with the second element from halh – a meadow in a river valley. People with the surname include:

- Arthur Catterall (1883–1943), English concert violinist
- Bob Catterall (1900–1961), South African cricket player
- Carla P. Catterall (born 1951), Australian ecologist and ornithologist
- Charles Catterall (1914–1966), South African Olympic boxer
- Claire-Louise Catterall, British beauty queen and actress
- Duncan Catterall (born 1978), English cricket player
- Jack Catterall (born 1993), British boxer
- Joanne Catherall (born 1962), English singer for the band The Human League
- Marlene Catterall (born 1939), Canadian politician from Ontario; MP 1998–2006
- Pippa Catterall (born 1961), British academic historian
- Ralph T. Catterall (1897–1978), American judge
- Simon Catterall (born 1964), American physicist
- Stuart Catterall (born 1975), English cricketer
- William A. Catterall (born 1946), American pharmacologist and neurobiologist

== See also ==
- Cattrall
