= Robert Alan Beuth =

American actor (born 1957)

- Born: Robert Alan Beuth; November 30, 1957 (age 68); Albany, New York, U.S.
- Occupations: Actor; playwright; artist
- Years active: 1971–present

Robert Alan Beuth (born November 30, 1957) is an American actor, artist, and dramatist best known for portraying television character roles, with more than 50 to his name over a career now spanning four decades. He has worked prolifically in both comedy and drama, but is most notable for portraying the role of Mueller on two seasons of the syndicated talk-show spoof Night Stand with Dick Dietrick, in 1996 and 1997. Beuth also has an extensive repertoire in commercials, in feature films, and (in particular) on stage, where his work encompasses acting, playwriting, and – most renownedly – the design and sculpting of theatrical masks and puppets.

== Life and career ==
=== Early life ===
Beuth was born on November 30, 1957, in Albany, New York, third of four children to Philip R. Beuth, a program director at television station WTEN, and Elizabeth C. née Yost, a homemaker. At that time, Philip was just starting out on what would prove to be a long and prestigious career with the Capital Cities Television Corporation, the broadcasting conglomerate newly founded by various members of WTEN's management team; consequently, the family moved around repeatedly during Robert's youth, as Philip advanced through a succession of managerial positions at Capital Cities-owned stations such as WSAZ in Huntington, West Virginia and, ultimately, KFSN in Fresno, California. There, Beuth attended Tenaya Junior High School and Bullard High School, graduating from the latter in 1975.

=== Career beginnings ===
Beuth's interest in the dramatic arts began in childhood, but was initially stymied by lack of opportunities in his then-hometown of Huntington. However, the family's aforementioned move to Fresno in 1971 brought them into contact with "dozens of lifestyle amenities absent in Appalachia", including local theater; accordingly, Beuth quickly became a fixture in the Fresno Community Theater's children's program. By 1974, he had graduated to the main troupe, earned a reputation for ably portraying "rascal[ly characters] who make up in brass for what they lack in size", and was singled out for particularly rave reviews for his performance as the Cowardly Lion in their staging of The Wizard of Oz that December.

Following his high school graduation, Beuth briefly joined the Good Company Players, a dinner theater troupe operating out of the Fresno Hilton, before enrolling in the theater program at Fresno State University. A highlight of his two-year tenure at Fresno State was his performance at the 1976 American College Theatre Festival in Washington, D.C. as part of the cast of The Liberty Dance of Henry Sparrow, an original play authored by one of his own professors, Edward F. EmanuEl. Beuth also continued his work with the Fresno Community Theater during this time, garnering a Best Character Actor award for his turn as Herod in their production of Jesus Christ Superstar.

After leaving Fresno State in 1977, Beuth relocated to New York City and enrolled in acting classes at the William Esper Studio on the advice of family friend Wayne Rogers to secure professional work. Although he kept busy on a part-time basis in regional and summer-stock theater (notably with a 1981 stint with Montclair State University's Summerfun Theater, in which his performance as Ensign Pulver in Mister Roberts earned him comparisons to "a young Jack Lemmon", and a headline-making star turn in the Lake George Dinner Theatre's staging of Greater Tuna), Beuth later described this period of his life as a "jump into obscurity", in which success proved stubbornly elusive and he was forced to supplement his income with stints working as a waiter and a house painter.

=== Television ===
Although at first wholly devoted to theater, by 1982 Beuth had made some sporadic guest appearances on daytime soap operas, and worked for three years as a studio page for NBC's Saturday Night Live. In 1986, disillusioned with his lack of career advancement and with the encouragement of his father (who had recently been promoted as vice-president of early morning programming at ABC Entertainment), Beuth left New York for Los Angeles to try his hand in earnest at television acting. He initially regarded the move solely as a means of earning enough exposure and name recognition to one day return to the New York stage; however, his signing with the talent agency of Cunningham, Escott & Dipene led almost immediately to a steady flow of television work. Within a year, he accumulated credits for guest appearances on L.A. Law, Remington Steele, and Newhart, and a commercial in which he featured opposite Australian actor Paul Hogan just after Hogan's breakout role in Crocodile Dundee. Notwithstanding this new dimension to his career, Beuth still managed to retain a presence on the live stage, principally as a player in the Sunday Company of the improv and sketch comedy troupe The Groundlings.

The apex of Beuth's career in television came in January 1996, midway through the first season of the syndicated talk show spoof Night Stand with Dick Dietrick, when he was cast in the role of Mueller. Taking over for Peter Siragusa, who had played the essentially identical character "Miller" for the series' first 25 episodes, Beuth was the doggedly loyal but perpetually browbeaten showrunner and sidekick opposite the show's host and namesake, portrayed by fellow Groundlings alum Timothy Stack. (Indeed, the supporting cast of Night Stand was also replete with former Groundlings, prominently including Lynne Marie Stewart, Shirley Prestia, and Christopher Darga.) Beuth's role as Mueller would continue for the remainder of the series' two-season run, totaling 72 episodes in all.

In the years since the cancellation of Night Stand, Beuth has continued to accumulate a lengthy résumé of television work. A notable highlight of his later career is Slanted, a 2010 comedic web series created by Andrea Lwin and adapted from her autobiographical one-woman show of the same name, which chronicled her life as a second-generation Chinese-American aspiring to be a Hollywood actress. Beuth took an integral part in conceiving and developing the character of sleazy talent agent Marty Phister, which he played for two of the series' six episodes and for which he received an award for Outstanding Guest Actor in a Comedy Series at the 2011 LAWebFest.

=== Feature films ===
Beuth has also acted in a number of feature films over the course of his career, again generally in small character roles, including Hollywood blockbusters such as When Harry Met Sally..., In the Line of Fire, and Outbreak. New York Times critic Janet Maslin credited Beuth's appearance as mill worker Cy Ippeston in the 1990 horror movie Graveyard Shift for helping lend a certain "quirky appeal" to an otherwise uneven film adaptation of Stephen King's identically-titled short story.

=== Playwriting ===
Beuth's most notable effort as a playwright is Stories of the Season, which he created and wrote in collaboration with Robert George Harrison, an old acquaintance from his community theater days in Fresno. First staged as a production of the Pacific Theatre Ensemble of Culver City, California, the play's initial run in December 1992 earned praise from Los Angeles Times drama critic Sylvie Drake for its unusual structure and thematic influences: performances typically began with light hors d'oeuvres in the playhouse lobby and then proceeded to a stage sparsely appointed with a small selection of costumes and theatrical masks along with ten elaborately gift-wrapped boxes, five of which would be chosen by audience members to come onstage and open. Each box contained a printed story – described by the critic as "regenerative fables [that] draw heavily on mythology, miracles, and American Indian lore" – which would then be acted out by the production's five-person cast. These segments were interwoven with Christmas carol singalongs, conversations between cast and audience regarding personal holiday traditions, and other participatory elements.

Stories of the Season was revived the following year in an updated version that incorporated several new stories, some with a Hanukkah theme, and in the years since has itself become something of a holiday tradition among Southern California's theatrical community. Subsequent revivals have been staged locally by the Gascon Theater Center and the Echo Theater Company, and the show has also occasionally been taken on the road to out-of-town destinations such as Santa Fe, New Mexico and Stony Brook, New York.

In 2003, Beuth followed up the success of Stories of the Season with a second dramatic effort, In the Valley of the Mist, again with Harrison as co-writer. Using 55 custom-designed puppets and masks as well as a cast largely drawn from the youth acting troupe of Santa Monica, California's not-for-profit Virginia Avenue Project, In the Valley of the Mist tells the story of Raj, a young boy who runs away from his village into the wilderness and encounters a parade of fantastical characters on his journey to the play's titular destination.

Beuth's most recent foray as a dramatist is a one-man adaptation of the Adventures of Huckleberry Finn, which played for four weeks at the Moving Arts Theatre in Los Angeles in February and March 2024. Directed by Peter Van Norden and with sets designed by Tom Buderwitz, the production once again made prominent use of a collection of custom-designed puppets and was lauded for its "gentle and genial... humanity", especially in light of the ongoing critical reappraisal of Mark Twain's original novel. In July 2026, with financial sponsorship from the Edward C. and Ann T. Roberts Foundation, Huckleberry Finn was revived for an additional two-week run at the Mark Twain House and Museum in Hartford, Connecticut.

=== Sculpture ===
Aside from performance, Beuth's career as an artist mainly takes the form of the design and fabrication of theatrical masks and puppets, an interest that began while he was at the Fresno Community Theater. There, in addition to acting in the troupe, he was also employed as a custodian for the Fresno Memorial Auditorium, and thus had access to storage rooms where set elements and props were kept: an experience he likened to "a kid [being given] the keys to Disneyland at night". However, Beuth did not begin pursuing the craft in earnest until 1981, when he answered an ad that had been placed in a trade publication by Julie Taymor, a then-unknown but now-renowned theatrical artist who was soliciting students for an eight-week maskmaking course. Beuth soon began spending large amounts of his spare time sculpting masks in a workspace in his Manhattan studio apartment, first using Silastic and later neoprene. His handiwork is featured in all of his aforementioned self-written theatrical works, but also comprises custom fabrications for a variety of Southern California theater companies. He has also taught courses in theatrical maskmaking at the Harvard-Westlake School in Los Angeles.

After completing work on In the Valley of the Mist, Beuth began to expand his purview as a sculptor, studying for twelve years under Santa Monica-based artist Jonathan Bickhart and developing an additional specialty in the medium of cast bronze.

== Filmography ==
=== Films ===
Year	Film	Role	Director	Notes
1989	Ghostbusters II	Store Manager	Ivan Reitman	
1989	When Harry Met Sally...	Man on Aisle	Rob Reiner	
1990	Graveyard Shift	Cy Ippeston	Ralph S. Singleton	
1993	Reckless Kelly	Beverly Hills Bank Teller	Yahoo Serious	
1993	In the Line of Fire	Man at Bank	Wolfgang Petersen	
1994	The Fantastic Four	Dr. Hauptman	Oley Sassone	Unreleased. Credited as Robert Beuth
1994	No Dessert, Dad, till You Mow the Lawn	Neighbor	Howard McCain	
1995	Outbreak	George Armistead	Wolfgang Petersen	
1995	Captain Nuke and the Bomber Boys	Agent Bob	Charles Gale	Direct-to-video release
1999	The Story of Us	Obstetrician	Rob Reiner	
1999	Kiss Toledo Goodbye	Harry	Lyndon Chubbuck	Direct-to-video release
2001	The Shrink Is In	Man in Elevator	Richard Benjamin	
2001	Heartbreakers	Maître d'	David Mirkin	
2003	Grand Theft Parsons	Reporter	David Caffrey	
2005	Fun with Dick and Jane	Male Globodyne Employee	Dean Parisot	
2006	It's a Wonderful iLife	PC	J. P. Pierce	Short film
2007	Buddy System	Mr. Royce	J. P. Pierce	Short film
2009	Thanks for Dying	Don Quigley	R. J. McFarlane	
2010	It's a Horrible Life	Mr. Potter	Gregg Binkley	Short film
2016	Sensitivity Training	George	Melissa Finell	
2021	The United States vs. Billie Holiday	Congressman J. Rankin	Lee Daniels	

=== Television ===
Year(s)	Title	Role(s)	Notes
1987	L.A. Law	Attorney Jones	S1E15 "December Bribe". Credited as Robert Beuth
1987	Remington Steele		S5E3 "Steele Hanging in There: Part 1"
1987	Newhart	Barry Drobes	S5E23 "Good-Bye & Good Riddance, Mr. Chips"
1987	Our House		S2E1 "Sounds from a Silent Clock: Part 1"; S2E2 "Sounds from a Silent Clock: Part 2"
1987	The New Gidget	Councilman	S2E2 "Bred to Shred"
1988	ALF	Howard	S2E22 "Movin' Out". Credited as Robert Beuth
1988	Just in Time		S1E2 "All the Editor's Men"
1988	On the Fritz	Network Executive	TV movie. Credited as Robert Beuth
1988	Dynasty	Morgue Assistant	S9E4 "Body Trouble"
1989	Anything but Love	Star Squad Commander Adams	S2E11 "Woman on the Verge of a Nervous Breakdown"
1990	Open House	The Client	S1E22 "The Real Estate Thing"
1990–1991	General Hospital	Concierge; Desk Clerk	3 episodes
1991	A Triumph of the Heart: The Ricky Bell Story	PR Man	TV movie
1991	Santa Barbara	Auditor	Episode #1778
1992	Camp Wilder		S1E9 "Something Wilder"
1993	Reasonable Doubts	Agent Dawkins	S2E15 "Thank God, It's Friday"
1994	The Adventures of Young Indiana Jones: Hollywood Follies	Manny	TV movie
1995	Coach	Desk Clerk	S7E15 "Close Encounters of the Worst Kind"
1995–1997	Night Stand with Dick Dietrick	Mueller	Main role in final 72 episodes of series, beginning with S1E25 "Athletes as Role Models" (1996). Also played the role of Donny in S1E21 "Mistrial of the Century" (1995). Credited as Robert Beuth or Robert Alan Booth (sic) for some episodes.
1996	Murphy Brown	Robert	S8E23 "Stepping Out"
1996	Norma Jean & Marilyn	Commissary Photographer	TV movie
1996	Alien Avengers	Nervous Customer	TV movie
1996	Life with Louie		S2E1 "Caddy on a Hot Tin Roof" (voice)
1997	Chicago Hope	Harry Derkin	S3E12 "Split Decisions"
1998	Team Knight Rider	Cal Tech Engineer #1	S1E20 "Apocalypse Maybe". Credited as Bob Beuth
1998	Party of Five	Willard	S5E2 "Separation Anxiety"
1999	Caroline in the City	Realtor	S4E16 "Caroline and the Ancestral Home"
1999	Payne	Minister	S1E8 "Wedding Fever"
2000	Rude Awakening	Arthur	S2E20 "Star 80 Proof"
2000	Suddenly Susan	Howie	S4E16 "Girls Night Out"
2002	Son of the Beach	Town Crier	S3E8 "Hamm Stroker's Suck My Blood"
2002	Malcolm in the Middle	Tom	S4E3 "Family Reunion"
2003	CSI: Miami	Principal Roland	S1E20 "Grave Young Men"
2003	The West Wing	Translator	S4E20 "Evidence of Things Not Seen"
2003	Friends	Professor Klarik	S9E23 "The One in Barbados". Uncredited
2003	Charmed	Salesman	S6E4 "The Power of Three Blondes"
2005	Fielder's Choice	Mitchell	TV movie
2006	ER	ICU Chief	S12E12 "Split Decisions"
2009	Lie to Me	Angry Guest	S1E4 "Love Always"
2009	Monk	D.A. Charles Friedken	S8E5 "Mr. Monk Takes the Stand"
2010	Rules of Engagement	City Official	S4E6 "Third Wheel". Credited as Robert Beuth
2011	Slanted	Marty Phister	Web series. S1E2 "Marty Phister"; S1E3 "Doubt This"
2011	Accidentally in Love	Doctor	TV movie
2011	Law & Order: LA	Larry Phillips	S1E20 "El Sereno"
2012	Awake	Stan Drake	S1E2 "The Little Guy"
2013	Bones	Bert Hogue	S9E9 "The Fury in the Jury"
2013	Betas	Investor #3	S1E8 "Show & Tell"
2014	Grey's Anatomy	Mr. Gorder	S10E18 "You Be Illin'"
2014	Stalker	Ron	S1E2 "Whatever Happened to Baby James?"
2015	Kirby Buckets	Mr. Sands	S2E2 "The Gil in My Life"
2018	The Guest Book	Stan	S2E2 "Under Cover"
2022	As We See It	Marcus	S1E2 "I Apologize for My Words and Actions"
2023	The Conners	Big Belly Man	S5E11 "Two More Years and a Stolen Rose"
2023	Minx	Cliff	S2E2 "I Thought the Bed Was Gonna Fly"
2023	Lessons in Chemistry	Frank Marsten	3 episodes
2025	Matlock	Judge Sheldon Flecher	S1E10 "Crash Helmets On"
2026	One Hundred Years of Solitude	Mr. Herbert	S2E4 "The Innocent Train Had Arrived"
2026	Georgie & Mandy's First Marriage	Hank	S3E7 "A Party Sub and a Six-Legged Fan"

=== Video games ===
Year	Title	Role	Notes
2011	L.A. Noire	Barton Keyes	
