= Rent Control (2005 film) =

2005 television film by David Eric Brenner

- Written by: David Eric Brenner
- Directed by: David Eric Brenner
- Starring: Melissa Joan Hart; Ryan Browning; Carmen Electra; Andrew Kavovit
- Original language: English

Production
- Cinematography: Christopher Duddy
- Editor: Brett Hedlund
- Running time: 95 minutes

Original release
- Network: ABC Family
- Release: September 9, 2005

Rent Control (aka Aunt Agatha's Apartment) is a television film starring Melissa Joan Hart and Carmen Electra. It was filmed in April 2001, but premiered on ABC Family in 2005. It was written and directed by David Eric Brenner. Outside the United States, it is known as Aunt Agatha's Apartment. The film's budget was $1 million.

== Plot ==
An optimistic couple from Iowa are living in New York City with an elderly aunt while trying to make it as actors. When the aunt dies, the couple hide her death in order to continue living in her rent-controlled apartment.

== Cast ==
- Melissa Joan Hart as Holly Washburn
- Ryan Browning as Calvin
- Andrew Kavovit as Dennis
- Carmen Electra as Audrey
- Don Novello as Rico
- Joel Michaely as Peter
- Lynne Marie Stewart as Aunt Agatha
- Shirley Prestia as Aunt Rose
- Ron Perkins as Gene
- Ric Borelli as Sleazy Building Manager
- Alan Dale as George
- Richard Livingston as Leonard Lasso
- Beege Barkette as Claire Fealy
- Earl Schuman as Iggy
- Joseph D. Reitman as Vincent
