= Mark Ross =

Mark Ross may refer to:

- Mark Ross (baseball)
- Mark Ross (rugby league)
- Mark Ross (politician)
- Brother Marquis (Mark D. Ross), American rapper and Miami bass pioneer
