= Bound (1996 film) =

1996 film by the Wachowskis

- Theatrical release poster
- Directed by: The Wachowskis (Note: Credited as "The Wachowski Brothers"; the Criterion 4K release re-credited the duo as "The Wachowskis".)
- Written by: The Wachowskis
- Produced by: Andrew Lazar; Stuart Boros
- Starring: Jennifer Tilly; Gina Gershon; Joe Pantoliano; John Ryan
- Cinematography: Bill Pope
- Edited by: Zach Staenberg
- Music by: Don Davis
- Production companies: Dino De Laurentiis Company; Spelling Films
- Distributed by: Gramercy Pictures (North America); Summit Entertainment (international)
- Release dates: August 31, 1996 (Venice); October 4, 1996 (United States)
- Running time: 108 minutes
- Country: United States
- Language: English
- Budget: $6 million
- Box office: $7 million

Bound is a 1996 American neo-noir film written and directed by the Wachowskis in their feature film directorial debut. It stars Jennifer Tilly, Gina Gershon, and Joe Pantoliano. The film centers on Violet (Tilly), a gun moll who longs to escape her relationship with her mobster boyfriend Caesar (Pantoliano), as she enters into a clandestine affair with alluring ex-convict Corky (Gershon). The two women hatch a scheme to steal $2 million of Mafia money. The film was John P. Ryan's final appearance before he died in 2007.

Bound was the first film directed by the Wachowskis, and they took inspiration from Billy Wilder to tell a noir story filled with sex and violence. Financed by Dino De Laurentiis, the film was made on a tight budget with the help of frugal crew members including cinematographer Bill Pope. The directors initially struggled to cast the lesbian characters of Violet and Corky before securing Tilly and Gershon. To choreograph the sex scenes, the directors employed sex educator Susie Bright as an ad hoc intimacy coordinator, and she also made a cameo appearance in the film.

Bound received several festival awards and positive reviews from film critics who praised the humor and style of the directors as well as the realistic portrayal of a lesbian relationship in a mainstream film. Detractors of the film found its plot superficial and criticized the violence as excessive. In the years since its release, the film has developed a cult following, particularly among LGBTQ audiences. (Note: Attributed to multiple references:)

== Plot ==
Corky, a lesbian ex-convict, is hired as a painter and plumber at a Chicago apartment building. She encounters Violet and Caesar, the couple who live next door to the apartment she is renovating. While Caesar is gone, Violet seduces Corky. They are interrupted by Caesar and Corky returns to work. When she leaves for the day, Violet follows Corky to her truck, and they have sex in Corky's apartment. The next morning, Violet tells Corky that Caesar is a money launderer for the Mafia and that they have been together for five years.

Later, Violet overhears Caesar and his mob associates torturing Shelly, a man who has been embezzling money from the business. Upset, she confides to Corky that she wants to make a new life for herself, but that she needs her help. Knowing that Caesar will bring the more than $2 million that Shelly skimmed back to the apartment, the two women hatch a scheme to steal the money. Johnnie, the son of Mafia boss Gino Marzzone, kills Shelly, angering Caesar, who returns to the apartment with a bag of bloody money. Caesar washes, irons and hangs the money to dry.

Violet explains to Corky that Caesar and Johnnie hate each other, and that Gino and Johnnie will be coming to pick up the money from Caesar. Corky devises a plan: when Caesar has finished counting the money, he will shower to unwind. While he does, Violet will purposely drop a bottle of Glenlivet scotch that Gino prefers and tell Caesar that she is going to buy more. As she leaves the apartment, Corky will enter, steal the money from a briefcase and leave. Violet will then return with the scotch and tell Caesar that she just saw Johnnie leave. Suspicious, Caesar will check the briefcase, find the money gone and assume Johnnie has taken it. Corky and Violet think Caesar will be forced to flee because Gino will assume he has been robbed by Caesar, not Johnnie.

When Caesar finds the money gone, he realizes Gino will think he stole it if he runs and decides to retrieve the money from Johnnie. Panicking, Violet threatens to leave, but Caesar forces her to stay, suspecting she and Johnnie may have stolen the money and framed him. Corky waits next door with the money while Gino and Johnnie arrive. After Johnnie flirts with Violet and taunts him, Caesar pulls out a gun and tells Gino that his son stole the money. He kills Gino, Johnnie and Roy, Gino's bodyguard. Caesar tells Violet that they must find the money, dispose of the bodies and pretend Gino and Johnnie never arrived lest their mob associates discover their absence. Unable to find the money at Johnnie's apartment, Caesar telephones Mickey, a mob buddy, telling him that Gino has yet to arrive.

After discovering Corky and Violet stole the money, Caesar ties them up, threatens to torture them and demands to know where it is. When Mickey arrives at the apartment, Caesar makes a deal with Violet to help him stall. Violet calls their landline from Johnnie's cell phone and convinces Caesar to feign a conversation with Gino explaining that he and Johnnie are in the hospital after a car accident. The ruse fools Mickey, who leaves for the hospital. Corky tells Caesar she has hidden the money in the next-door apartment, and he goes to retrieve it. Violet escapes and calls Mickey, telling him that Caesar stole the money and forced her to keep quiet. Corky tries to stop Caesar from taking the money, but he assaults her. Violet arrives and holds Caesar at gunpoint; she informs him Mickey is coming and that he should run while he can. When Caesar refuses, Violet kills him.

Later, Mickey, who believes Violet's story, tells her that he will find Caesar. Mickey wants Violet to be his girlfriend, but she tells him that she needs a clean break—which she makes by driving off hand-in-hand with Corky.

== Cast ==
- Jennifer Tilly as Violet
- Gina Gershon as Corky
- Joe Pantoliano as Caesar
- John Ryan as Mickey Malnato
- Christopher Meloni as Johnnie Marzzone
- Richard C. Sarafian as Gino Marzzone
- Barry Kivel as Sheldon "Shelly"
- Mary Mara as Sue
- Susie Bright as Jesse
- Margaret Smith as female cop
- Peter Spellos as Lou
- Ivan Kane and Kevin M. Richardson as male cops
- Gene Borkan as Roy

== Themes ==
The Wachowskis describe several themes present in Bound. They say that the film is about "the boxes people make of their lives", that it is not only gay people who "live in closets". They wanted to define all of Bound's characters by the "sort of trap that they were making out of their lives". Violet is trapped in her life with Caesar, and in the first scene, Corky is literally inside Violet's closet, bound and gagged by Caesar. This scene is echoed later in the film when Violet says "I had this image of you inside of me..." This theme of being trapped is exacerbated by the claustrophobic feeling created by the fact that most of the film takes place in Violet and Caesar's apartment, or the apartment next door where Corky is working.

Feminist writer and sex educator Susie Bright choreographed the film's sex scenes. She described the film as having specifically lesbian themes. One is the concept of the hand as a sex organ, highlighted by lingering camera shots of Corky and Violet's hands. Another is the repeated use of water as a symbolic motif to represent women, present for example when Corky is retrieving Violet's earring from the sink. Bright describes it as a movie that is "wet" (feminine) as opposed to "hard" (masculine). She says the scene where Corky and Violet have their first conversation is full of "lesbian signs". She highlights the fact that Violet, away from Caesar, is wearing jeans and able to be less overtly feminine. Jennifer Tilly says that whenever Violet is talking to men, her voice becomes high-pitched and "girly"—making her seem vulnerable and ensuring she is taken care of. Joe Pantoliano agrees, saying that the result is that "everyone in the film wants to be with Violet". When she is with Corky, Violet can drop the act and talk at a more natural pitch. According to Bright, the more subtle lesbian themes of the film were noticed and appreciated at the LGBTQ film festival screenings.

== Development and production ==
=== Conception ===
Film producer Joel Silver has said that after working as scriptwriters on Assassins, the Wachowskis made Bound as an "audition piece" to prove that they knew what to do on a movie set. Conversely, Lana Wachowski has said Silver "made that up". The Wachowskis themselves claim they "decided simply to focus on making their own directorial debut." They had the idea to write a story about how one might see a woman on the street and make assumptions about her sexuality, but how those assumptions might be wrong. They wanted to play with stereotypes and make an entertaining film that contained sex and violence, because those are the kinds of films that they like to watch. Seeing film noir as a genre within which they could tell a contained story and twist conventions, they described Billy Wilder as a big influence.

When executives at some studios read the script, they told the Wachowskis that if they changed the character of Corky to that of a man, they would be interested. The siblings declined, saying "that movie's been made a million times, so we're really not interested in it." Dino De Laurentiis, the executive producer on Assassins, offered to finance Bound and his company produced it, giving them "free rein" with regard to the story. The film's budget was $6 million.

=== Casting ===
The Wachowskis struggled to cast the roles of Violet and Corky, seemingly because of the lesbian content of the film. Few actresses were interested. The part of Violet was expected to go to Linda Hamilton, and Jennifer Tilly read for the part of Corky. She loved the role and was looking forward to playing a character very different from previous parts in her career. When the part of Violet became available, and Gina Gershon came in to read for Corky, Tilly agreed that Gershon would make a better Corky. She realized that she identified with the character of Violet, a woman "underestimated by all the men around her" who has to "play the game". She describes it as the best role she had ever had. Gina Gershon suggested Joe Pantoliano to the Wachowskis for the part of Caesar. It was his first lead role in a film, and he describes it as his favorite.

=== Filming ===
Bound was filmed over a 38-day period in Santa Monica, California. The Wachowskis' original director of photography resigned, claiming that he could not film with the limited budget available, nor did he know anyone else who would be willing to work so cheaply. Subsequently, cinematographer Bill Pope was hired, who knew "a bunch of cheap guys" who would be willing to work within the budget. Pope was heavily involved in creating the visual noir style of the film. He and the Wachowskis drew inspiration from their love of comics and were particularly influenced by Frank Miller's neo-noir Sin City series. Pope's sound counterpart was sound director Dane Davis. In the scene where Corky and Violet plan the theft, he chose to give Corky a cat-like quality, by supplying a "swishing" sound each time she walked past the camera.

The Wachowskis asked Joe Pantoliano to watch John Huston's The Treasure of the Sierra Madre and to focus on Humphrey Bogart's character in order to portray Caesar's paranoia. Gershon's role was influenced by James Dean, Marlon Brando and Clint Eastwood. Both Gershon and Tilly were nervous about the sex scenes, and prepared for filming by drinking tequila.

Very little improvisation took place during the filming due to the directors' extensive planning and clear vision for the film. Despite their planning, the physical exchanges in the script caused some injuries. Barry Kivel was injured, when his head was banged against a toilet, in the scene where Shelly was violently beaten in Caesar's bathroom. Gina Gershon was also injured. In a scene between Corky and Caesar, near the end of the film, Gershon struck a gun from Pantoliano's hand so violently she required stitches.

Having Corky play a jaw harp was Gina Gershon's idea. The Wachowskis wanted to use "The Girl from Ipanema" and Frank Sinatra songs, but their song budget would not cover it.

=== Sex scenes ===
The sex scenes were choreographed by feminist writer and sex educator Susie Bright. The Wachowskis were fans of Bright and sent her a copy of the script with a letter asking her to be an extra in the film. Bright loved the script, particularly as it was about women unapologetically having and enjoying sex. Disappointed by the lack of description in the sex scenes, she offered to be a sex consultant for the film, and they accepted. The main sex scene, set in Corky's apartment, was filmed in one long shot. The Wachowskis believed that the continuous shot would be more realistic than several shots edited together. Although it was intended to be a closed set, there were actually many people present, moving the walls of the set in order to allow full movement of the camera around the actors.

Bright appeared as Jesse, the woman Corky tries to talk to in the bar. Comedian Margaret Smith played Jesse's girlfriend and the extras in the bar scene were Bright's friends—"real life San Francisco dykes".

=== Music ===
The film score was written and conducted by Don Davis, who would later collaborate with the Wachowskis on The Matrix Trilogy. The film features the songs "I Never Loved a Man the Way I Love You" by Aretha Franklin, "Hallelujah I Love Her So" by Ray Charles, "She's a Lady" by Tom Jones, and "Hopeless Faith" by the riot grrl band The Hail Marys.

== Release ==
The film premiered at the 53rd Venice International Film Festival on August 31, 1996, and was screened at the 1996 Toronto International Film Festival in September. It was released theatrically in the United States on October 4, 1996, by Gramercy Pictures, showing in 261 theaters. It closed after three weeks. It opened in the United Kingdom on February 28, 1997.

=== Rating ===
Bound was initially rated NC-17 by the Motion Picture Association of America (MPAA) upon first viewing, but the film was later softened to R for "strong sexuality, violence and language." To achieve the R rating, the directors had to cut part of the first sex scene between Corky and Violet. The MPAA were most concerned with the images of what Lana Wachowski called "hand-sex". It was rated R in Australia, R18 in New Zealand and 18 in the United Kingdom. In Canada it was rated as R in Manitoba and Ontario, 18 in Nova Scotia and 16+ in Quebec.

=== Home media ===
Bound was released on Region 1 DVD on November 12, 1997, by Republic Pictures. It featured the original theatrical trailer and an audio commentary by the directors and stars. It was released on Region 2 DVD on August 25, 2003, by Pathé featuring original theatrical trailers, audio commentary by the directors and stars, cast and crew biographies and a production featurette. Its Region 4 DVD release, distributed by Reel and featuring an audio commentary, came on August 14, 2006. On June 18, 2024, The Criterion Collection released the film on Blu-ray, based on a 4K restoration supervised by cinematographer Bill Pope. The restored film also re-credited the duo's names as "The Wachowskis" in the directing section and "Lana and Lilly Wachowski" in the executive producers section.

== Reception ==
=== Box office ===
Bound grossed $3.8 million in the United States and $3.2 million from other territories, for a worldwide total of $7 million. On its opening weekend, showing at 261 theaters, it earned $900,902, which was 23.7% of its total gross. According to Box Office Mojo, it ranked at 161 for all films released in the United States in 1996, and at 74 for R-rated films released that year. As of October 2012, its all-time ranking for LGBTQ films is 59.

=== Critical response ===
On the review aggregator website Rotten Tomatoes, the film holds an approval rating of 87% based on 71 reviews, with an average average of 8/10. The website's critics consensus reads: "Bound's more titillating elements attracted attention, but it's the stylish direction, solid performances, and entertaining neo-noir caper plot that make it worth a watch". Metacritic, which uses a weighted average, assigned the film a score of 64 out of 100, based on 19 critics, indicating "generally favorable" reviews.

The Wachowskis' direction was praised, being described as clever, sophisticated and stylish. Roger Ebert said that their skillful film making showed virtuosity and confidence. Marjorie Baumgarten writing for The Austin Chronicle called it an impressive debut saying that the Wachowskis have "style to burn". James Kendrick called it a darkly comical and stunning film, saying it signalled the arrival of the Wachowskis on the film scene. Detractors of the film included Todd McCarthy for Variety, who said that the directors had no sense of humor and lacked depth, that the film was pretentious, superficial and heavy-handed.

On the release of Bound, the Wachowskis were compared by many to the Coen brothers. Rita Kempley for The Washington Post went so far as to call them "Coen Brothers clones". In particular, similarities were drawn between Bound and the Coen Brothers' first film, 1984 neo-noir Blood Simple. Bryant Frazer for Deep Focus called it an "obvious precursor". Critics noted resemblances to the films of Quentin Tarantino and Alfred Hitchcock.

Janet Maslin for The New York Times said that the grisly violence in Bound would likely limit its audience and Ebert said that its shocking violence would offend some audiences. Some critics said that the violent behavior of the characters had no moral justification. Rita Kempley for The Washington Post called it "well-nigh unwatchable cruelty for its own sake". McCarthy, who called the central relationship between the two women unbelievable and unsympathetic, said "just because Violet and Corky fall for each other doesn't mean they somehow fall into a privileged state of grace in which vile behavior can be forgiven." Other critics were less concerned, calling the violence "comically excessive" and "Tarantino-like".

Bound was praised for being perhaps the first mainstream film to have a lesbian relationship at its heart without homosexuality being central to the plot. Despite the presence of "unapologetically gay" lead character Corky, it is not commonly considered a "lesbian movie". Emanuel Levy said that this is a weakness, that mainstream films with broadening storylines "do not necessarily represent a positive development in the making of gay and lesbian films" and that Bound has "little, if anything, to do with lesbian cinema". Jonathan Rosenbaum for the Chicago Reader called it a "welcome change" to have a lesbian couple as the main characters in a mainstream film. Sarah Warn for AfterEllen.com called Corky "the closest thing to a realistic and sympathetic butch lesbian we've seen in a mainstream movie". Barry Walters for the San Francisco Chronicle praised the film for showing gay characters that have an active sex life. The sex scenes, described as explicit and steamy, were admired for being tasteful, discreet and realistic. Warn called them "some of the best lesbian sex scenes to date in a mainstream movie".

The three lead actors were complimented for their performances. Ebert said that Gershon and Tilly were electric together, and Frazer said that he would have liked to have seen more of their love story. Some critics described their onscreen relationship as unbelievable and unsympathetic. Gershon was seen to have made a comeback after her role in the less well received 1995 film Showgirls. Tilly's performance was compared to her Academy Award-nominated part in Bullets Over Broadway. Pantoliano was described as "a lot of fun" and having the "trickiest scenes in the movie".

=== Accolades ===
Bound won the Grand Jury Award—Honorable Mention at the 1996 L.A. Outfest, and in the same year won an Honorable Mention at the Stockholm International Film Festival. At the 1997 Fantasporto festival in Portugal, the Wachowskis were awarded the International Fantasy Film Award for best film, and Jennifer Tilly picked up the award for best actress. Bound won the 1997 GLAAD Media Award for Outstanding (wide-release) Film. The film was nominated for the prestigious Grand Prix of the Belgian Syndicate of Cinema Critics.

== Legacy ==
Bound is often cited as one of the best films featuring lesbian characters.

== See also ==
- List of LGBTQ-related films directed by women
