= Jon Simmons =

American talent manager and acting coach

Jon Simmons is an American talent manager and acting coach operating out of Los Angeles. He is the co-founder of Simmons and Scott Entertainment.

== Early life ==
Simmons was born in Bonne Terre, Missouri to William C. and Marcille Nina (Cartmill) Simmons, and he grew up in St. Charles, Missouri. He graduated from St. Charles High School and later attended Hannibal LaGrange College in Hannibal, Missouri, and finished his undergraduate at Carson Newman College in Jefferson City, Tennessee with a BA in Psychology and Religion.

Eventually landing in Dallas, Texas, Jon started his entertainment career with the Kim Dawson agency where he modeled and acted in commercials. From this beginning he decided to make a break in Hollywood.

== Career ==
Simmons began as an actor in soaps, having a recurring day player role on General Hospital as well as roles on The Bold and the Beautiful and Santa Barbara. He later appeared on Alias, Sports Night, 7th Heaven, Dr. Quinn, Medicine Woman, and as young Alfred Pennyworth in Batman & Robin. After being an actor for several years, Jon decided to change the direction. He turned to talent management and founded Simmons and Scott Entertainment in 1999 with Carl Scott, formerly of Warner Bros. Records. Their first client was Chad Michael Murray. Jon was also instrumental in beginning the careers of Garrett Hedlund, Chris Zylka, D. J. Cotrona, Brandon Buddy Drew Roy, Max Greenfield, Jesse Plemons, Nate Parker, Luke Kleintank, Kat Graham, Colton Haynes, J. D. Pardo, Nicole Gale Anderson, Casey Deidrick and Ryan Carnes.

Simmons is known for coaching and teaching each of his actors, personally fine tuning their skills. Many of his clients, both former and current, attribute their success to his guidance. Plemons says that "If I have any talent, it's because of him. He's an amazing acting coach … I studied with him for nine years". Zylka has stated that "Jon became not only a father figure, but a mentor and my voice of reason. If anyone has a Jiminy Cricket, it's me. For sure!".

== Filmography ==
Year	Title	Role	Notes
1987	LA Law	Waiter	TV series
1997	NewsRadio	Dave's Lawyer	TV series
1997	Silk Stalkings	Minister	TV series
1997	Buddy	Theatergoer	
1997	Batman & Robin	Young Alfred Pennyworth	
1997	The Tony Danza Show	Middle Aged Man	TV series
1998	House Rules	Fellow Doctor	TV series
1998	7th Heaven	Richard Watson	TV series
1998	Ellen	Minister	TV series
1998	Sports Night	Burke	TV series
1999	Providence	Bar Customer	TV series
2000	The Bold and the Beautiful	Minister	TV series
2002	Alias	F.B.I. Officer	TV series, (final television appearance)
