= Night Stand with Dick Dietrick =

- Also known as: Night Stand
- Created by: Paul Abeyta; Peter Kaikko; Timothy Stack
- Presented by: Timothy Stack (as Dick Dietrick)
- Country of origin: United States
- No. of episodes: 96 (divided into 2 shows per episode)

Production
- Executive producers: Larry Strawther (season 1); Timothy Stack (season 2)
- Production locations: Sunset Gower Studios, Hollywood
- Running time: 60 minutes
- Production companies: RC Entertainment; Big Ticket Television

Original release
- Network: First-run syndication E!
- Release: September 16, 1995 – 1997

Night Stand with Dick Dietrick is an American television comedy show that parodied American tabloid talk shows. The series was originally broadcast in first-run syndication from 1995 to 1997, as well as on the E! Entertainment Television network. Night Stand was co-created by Paul Abeyta, Peter Kaikko and actor/writer Timothy Stack, who also starred as the show's host Dick Dietrick. The show benefited from contributions by writer/friends of the creators, namely co-executive producer Larry Strawther (the first season showrunner) and the long-time comedy writing team of Bob Illes and Jim Stein.

== History ==
At the time of its premiere on September 16, 1995, Night Stand ran in over 87% of the U.S. markets, mainly as a Saturday evening program airing against, or if carried by an NBC station, after Saturday Night Live. It also aired on E! Monday-Thursday at 10:30 p.m. (between Talk Soup and the Howard Stern) and was distributed internationally. The partnership with E! led to a follow-up second season.

Unlike other shows, each hour-long syndicated episode was actually divided into two separate half-hour programs which yielded 96 episodes for E! reruns. (E! kept the show for several years but only in reruns.)

Much of the Night Stand production team went on to work with Howard Stern on Son of the Beach, with some of their "guests" also making appearances.

Night Stand was the first production from Big Ticket Productions, the company formed by former Warner Bros. development executive Larry Lyttle. Strawther had worked with Abeyta and Kaikko at Merv Griffin Productions and later worked with Lyttle on the shows My Sister Sam and Night Court. Strawther brought on Night Court director Jim Drake and they developed the tape-four-shows-a-week format that made the show financially practical. Strawther did not return as showrunner for the second season after he and Stack differed on when silliness went "over the top."

The show's original slogan "If you don't have Night Stand, you don't have Dick" and The Comedy That Makes Up Talk was later changed to The Comedy That Makes Fun of Talk.

Night Stand helped Big Ticket Productions get started. They did even better on its next project, Judge Judy. The show's original publicist was Howard Bragman, who is now considered one of Hollywood's top publicists.

Produced: 1995–1997 (96 episodes, 2 shows per syndicated episode)

The show's writers and executive producers watched episodes of tabloid talk shows, such as The Jenny Jones Show, for inspiration.

== Cast ==
=== Main ===
- Timothy Stack as Dick Dietrick, the show's host and namesake
- Peter Siragusa as Miller, Dick's long-suffering assistant on the show. Beginning midway through the first season, the role was taken over by Robert Alan Beuth and the character renamed "Mueller".
- Lynne Marie Stewart as a character variously referred to as "Audience Member", "Lady in Audience", and so forth along those lines. As her name indicates, she was part of the studio audience in almost all episodes and often asked inane questions of the show's main guests.
- Judy Toll was the female announcer who introduced Dietrick at the beginning of each episode and narrated most of the interstitial bumpers (including the ubiquitous "you can get Dick on the World Wide Web" promos advertising the show's website), and was also on the writing staff.

=== Recurring panelists ===
- Dwayne Barnes as gangsta rapper MC Carjak
- Jordana Capra as Dr. Susan Sonspeen, feminist lecturer, author, and "Professor of Lesbian Studies at Lily Tomlin Women's College". Blunt, husky-voiced, and with a deadpan way about her, Dr. Sonspeen – even more than most of Night Stand's female panelists – makes no secret of the fact that she finds Dick (and men in general) repulsive.
- Steven Cragg as Peter Mithelmet, a snooty, pretentious, and sexually ambiguous European fashion designer
- Christopher Darga as Bob, a hard-drinking strip club owner, sexaholic, serial womanizer, pathological liar, and all-around creep whose sleazy schemes frequently serve as fodder for panel discussions. Whenever said schemes go awry, he invariably shrugs everything off with his all-purpose excuse: a nonchalantly delivered "Hey, I'm sick; I need help."
- Vinny Montello as Vinny, a belligerent man with a Brooklyn accent who frequently appeared in the studio audience, often making crass comments or threatening to beat up panelists he doesn't like.
- John Paragon played two recurring roles. The first of these was "Bachelor #3", an asbestos miner and laryngectomy patient who speaks (and sings karaoke) through an electronic voice prosthesis. This character debuted in one of the show's earliest episodes as the unlikely winner of a Dating Game-style contest, hence his name, and subsequently revisited the panel twice more along with his newfound beau, though his real name was never revealed. Paragon also played the unrelated role of sex education expert Dr. Edward Burns in two second-season episodes.
- Shirley Prestia as Mattie Gelman, an unlicensed therapist, relationship expert, and prolific self-help author. A frequent panelist especially earlier in the show's run, Mattie's personality comes off rather like a less abrasive version of Joan Rivers: she's a vivacious older Jewish lady with a throaty New York accent, a saucy wit, and an unrequited crush on Dick.
- Andrew Prine as Dr. Hamilton George, a world-renowned plastic surgeon who's considered the "Father of Nipple Replacement". Dr. George's skin is deeply tanned (like his name, this is a reference to actor George Hamilton) and he moves his body slowly and stiffly like a robot, presumably from having performed numerous cosmetic procedures on himself.
- Tim Silva as Dr. Lonnie Lanier, psychologist, self-help book author, and founder of the eponymous Lanier Institute. Like Stack himself, Silva was one of the many Groundlings graduates who appeared on the show.
- Steve Valentine as The Astounding Andy, a British-accented hypnotist, magician, and paranormal expert who frequently appears on the panel when the discussion turns toward things supernatural. His name is a parody of The Amazing Randi, a prominent illusionist-cum-skeptic who was a frequent fixture on The Tonight Show and other talk shows of the era, but the theatrical razzle-dazzle of his stage presence and personal mannerisms ultimately give the character much more in common with the likes of David Copperfield and Siegfried & Roy.
- Steve White as Tupac Zemeckis, acclaimed African-American director of films about gritty urban street life, along the lines of Spike Lee or John Singleton. (Appropriately enough, White's best-known roles as an actor were in Spike Lee's films Do the Right Thing, Mo' Better Blues, and Malcolm X.)

== Episodes ==
By default, episodes are listed here in their original production order. However — as was the case with many series in first-run syndication — the order in which Night Stand's distributors actually released them to stations for broadcast could vary due to factors such as ratings maximization, issues of post-production readiness, and so forth. For this reason, the episodes' original airdates given in the right-hand column of the following tables are not in chronological order.

=== Season 1 (1995–96) ===
No. overall	No. in season	Title	Directed by	Original release date
1	1	"Cults"	Jim Drake	December 2, 1995
Dick probes into the shadowy world of religious cults with an exposé of the "Children of Yerry", which guest panelist Lynda (Laura O'Loughlin) credits with turning her life around, but others claim is a front for a prostitution ring. Dr. Lonnie Lanier is also on hand to try his luck at "deprogramming" Lynda, with the help of her mother (Carole Androsky).
2	2	"Confessions"	Jim Drake	October 7, 1995
Guests confess the dark secrets they've been hiding from their loved ones: one (Rebecca Kyler Downs) whose mother doesn't know she's quit medical school to become a stripper; another (Micah McCain) who wants to "come out" as heterosexual to his same-sex partner. Also making his first of two appearances on the Night Stand panel is Father Chip (Hal Sparks in one of his earliest televised roles), a hip young Catholic priest with a revolutionary new idea to modernize worship for the cyber generation: drive-thru confessionals.
3	3	"Crime Show"	Jim Drake	September 30, 1995
After being publicly humiliated by front-page news coverage of his cowardly reaction to a mugging, Dick dedicates an entire show to defending his honor — and that of panelist Neil (Patrick T. O'Brien), the victim of a similar incident whom Dick helps to confront his assailant. Also on the panel are Maryanne Queefer (Lisa Lord), a former policewoman who's now hawking a line of self-defense-themed exercise tapes, and Vance Prudhoe (Shashawnee Hall), a vigilante-turned-self-help author who believes the best self-defense is a good "self-offense". Note: John Paragon appears uncredited toward the end of the final segment as a cardiologist seated in the studio audience. Paragon would later go on to future Night Stand appearances in a variety of other roles.
4	4	"Dating"	Jim Drake	September 16, 1995
Delving into the world of dating, Dick — along with the irrepressible Mattie Gelman — tries to help a pair of lovelorn guest panelists (Michael Luckerman; Heather Ehlers) find mates, Dating Game-style. For the finale, Dick gets acquainted with his own "perfect date", a buxom blonde helpfully linked with him via an online matchmaking service. Note: The aforementioned Dating Game-inspired segment marks the debut appearance of "Bachelor #3", portrayed by the similarly aforementioned John Paragon.
5	5	"It's My Body and I'll Cry If I Want To"	Dennis Rosenblatt	October 14, 1995
The panel debates how best to deal with excess body weight: flamboyant fitness guru Jonathon Felcher (comedian Ant doing an over-the-top parody of Richard Simmons) unsurprisingly favors exercise, while Dr. Hamilton George is on hand to tout the latest advances in liposuction, and body positivity activist Delores (Donna Pieroni) chimes in from the studio audience that fat people are fine just the way they are. Meanwhile, another audience member, Beverly (Helen Siff), is regaled backstage with an impromptu makeover — and not the lifesaving liver transplant she desperately needs. Note: Tim Bagley appears in one of his earliest roles as Hubie, the jilted ex-boyfriend of Jonathon's protégée Erline.
6	6	"Supernatural Sex"	Dennis Rosenblatt	October 7, 1995
Dick interviews Mandy (Holly Long), a woman who claims to be carrying on a torrid affair with a ghost, yet yearns for a committed relationship based on more than just sex. How to let him off easy? The subsequent two guests — voodoo priestess Mambo Santa Maria (Bridget Morrow) and creepy life-after-death expert Dr. Morte Gunty (Matt Gottlieb) — help bring a most unexpected end to the dalliance. Note: Jerry Springer's cameo at the end of the second segment marks the first of what will eventually be three appearances by him on the series. According to Stack, while most real-life talk show hosts tended not to appreciate being lampooned, Springer was an avid Night Stand fan who approached the show's producers specifically requesting to be written into an episode.
7	7	"So You Think You're a Lesbian"	Dennis Rosenblatt	September 30, 1995
Samantha (Colleen Tate) recently split from her fiancé Ray (Michael McDonald) after falling into an impromptu tryst with a stripper, Regina (Lynette Lane). Does this mean she's a lesbian? Dick invites all three on the show to hash the situation out — with a little help from Samantha's new therapist, Dr. Susan Sonspeen.
8	8	"Transvestite Wedding Show"	Dennis Rosenblatt	December 2, 1995
Sue (Ana B. Gabriel) is madly in love with her fiancé Guy (Paul Witten), and has high hopes for a future of joyous wedded bliss. The only sticking point? Guy is a cross-dresser, and Sue's conservative, blue-collar father Bob (Ron Harper) is none the wiser. Luckily, Dick has invited Mattie Gelman onto the panel to help sort the whole mess out. Note: Series regular Vinny Montello makes the first of his several appearances as a belligerent studio audience member on this episode, musing menacingly about "kick[ing] this freak's ass" (referring to Guy).
9	9	"Arctic Heat"	Dennis Rosenblatt	November 25, 1995
Dick welcomes the famous comedy writer-director Garry Marshall onto the show: ostensibly as a forum to promote his then-recently published memoir Wake Me When It's Funny, but really to try and sell him on the idea for a reboot of Arctic Heat, a cheesy action-adventure series starring a cast of buxom models (Tané McClure, Enya Flack, and April Jayne) whom Dick spends the first two segments obsequiously fawning over.
10	10	"Foxy News Babes"	Dennis Rosenblatt	October 14, 1995
Dick hosts dueling television news anchors Mary Stanley Laurel (Maura Soden) and Holly Montagna Rancheros (Darla Haun), of whom the former lost her job to the latter for refusing to cater to the sexist demands of their boss, Link Tartikoff (Jon Kean). Link, in turn, plans to pass Holly over for a promotion in favor of his "newest superstar": airheaded ex-porn star McCoy Pepino (Donna Eskra). Does journalistic integrity really matter to today's news viewers, or is it all about sex appeal? To find out, Dick puts all three through an obstacle course-style competition, with the coveted anchor job on the line and the studio audience as judge.
11	11	"Hatred's Not a Four-Letter Word"	Dennis Rosenblatt	April 27, 1996
Dick puts the spotlight on the rising specter of hate in America, in the form of Tiffany LeBlanc (Sarah Ann Morris): the newly hired spokeswoman for the Ku Klux Klan who's been tasked with revamping their tired old image for a new generation of bigot, and who squares off on the panel against urban cinematic auteur Tupac Zemeckis. Dr. Lonnie Lanier is on hand to mediate over a friendly game of "Twingo": his own self-created hybrid of Twister and bingo.
12	12	"Hooked on Hookers"	Dennis Rosenblatt	November 11, 1995
Dick takes "teenage hardbody prostitute" Krystal (Mathea Webb) off the mean streets of Hollywood and onto his panel: hearing out her hard-luck story, introducing her to reformed prostitute-turned-LAPD vice cop Molly Bolte (Julie Uribe) to set her on the right path, and then bringing on "call girl extraordinaire" and self-styled entrepreneur Tracy Ann Hepburn (Karen Person) to argue the counterpoint — and helm a "hooker fashion show" featuring selections from her self-owned catalog.
13	13	"Mama's Boys"	Dennis Rosenblatt	September 23, 1995
Andy (Kelly Perine) has been engaged for nine years to his exasperated fiancée Paula (Vanita Harbour) and set eleven different wedding dates, only to be thwarted each time by his overbearing mother, Blanche (Aloma Wright). Meanwhile, Roland (William Akey) is a never-married scoutmaster and musical theater fanatic who unapologetically describes his mother as his constant life companion. Both swear there's nothing amiss, but Dick's final interviewee — Teresa Matthews (D.D. Howard); couples therapist, self-help author, and ex-wife of a "mama's boy" — begs to differ.
14	14	"I'm Sorry"	Dennis Rosenblatt	October 28, 1995
Reconciliation is today's theme, and Dick hosts two sets of adversaries on the panel: first, eccentric inventor Artie Lavin (Milt Kogan), who's guilt-ridden over how things ended with his ex-wife Gwen (Cynthia Frost). Gwen seems open to forgiveness at first, but changes her tune upon meeting Artie's new, much younger fiancée Tami (Cheryl Richardson), who may or may not be after the fortune he's earned from his newly patented flatulence deodorizer. Meanwhile, teenage slacker Tyler (Marc Worden) has the hots for his tutor Hilary (Shannon Sukovaty), but there's one problem: the prank he and a friend filmed for America's Funniest Home Videos that ended in the death of her beloved dog, Fluffy.
15	15	"One-Night Stand Reunions"	Dennis Rosenblatt	September 23, 1995
In which Dick solicits viewers' fond memories of long-ago romantic trysts and then sets about reuniting them with their former partners: first circus dwarf Corky (Kevin Thompson) with motivational speaker Joanna (Kimberly Oja), then frisky seniors Rose (Eve Brent) and Edward (Glen Vernon), who'd met at a USO show in 1942 just before shipping off to fight in World War II. More darkly, flight attendant Kathy (a rare live-action role for Christine Cavanaugh) takes this opportunity to get even with a pair of pickup artist brothers (Steve Monroe; Richard Speight) whom she'd met in a hotel bar. Note: Arguably crossing the line from paying homage into outright plagiarism, Stack later admitted that he'd lifted this episode's topic verbatim from The Jenny Jones Show.
16	16	"The Fame Show"	Dennis Rosenblatt	November 4, 1995
Profiling the opportunists who live on the fringes of celebrity, Dick interviews Layla Downs (Carolyn Hennesy), a grifter whose M.O. is to stage accidents with famous people and feign injury as a pretext to ask them out on dates; sassy gossip columnist Francis DeMule (David Jahn); Barry Shaffer (Scott Hartman), the overlooked, bitter brother of bandleader Paul Shaffer, and Blanca Verde (Ana Mercedes), an immigrant housekeeper who's got a bone to pick with her employer: sitcom star Cindy Williams. Note: In addition to Cindy Williams' appearance as herself, Dennis Miller also makes a brief cameo as one of Layla's celebrity marks.
17	17	"Death in a Trailer Park"	Dennis Rosenblatt	October 21, 1995
This time around, the limelight belongs to the colorful denizens of the Pair O' Dice Trailer Park, who are at the center of a nationwide scandal. Betty Wilma Cooper (Jana Arnold) is grieving the loss of her son, Billy Ray Jim, a septic company magnate who recently died in a fiery auto wreck — or did he? A whirlwind of rumors is swirling around his widow Jolene (Sharise Baker) and trailer park owner Big Bob Little (Randy Polk), and investigative journalist Theresa Cook (Diane Glass) intends to get to the bottom of it all.
18	18	"Frivolous Lawsuits"	Dennis Rosenblatt	November 25, 1995
Attorneys Sharon Ann Kunstler (Annie Fitzgerald) and Norman Desmond (Mitchell Group) come on the panel to debate the pros and cons of our modern-day litigious society — and the merits of the discrimination case filed by Jamie LeFarr (Victoria Morsell), a client of Norman's who's suing her former employer over her termination after contracting a spurious disease. It all culminates in a mock trial with Sharon in the role of judge, Dick as defense attorney, and the studio audience as the jury.
19	19	"My Kid's a Race Traitor"	Dennis Rosenblatt	November 18, 1995
Becky (Aimee Bothwell) is a platinum-blonde teenager whose embrace of all things culturally African-American is driving her upper-class Bel Air parents to distraction. Similarly, Brad's (Sean Leisure) personal credo of "acting Black can hold you back" has drawn the ire of his father Timmafee Hardaway (J.D. Hall), a kente-wearing ex-Black Panther. Dick responds with a hastily improvised game show dubbed "The Race Card", where the kids team up to compete against the parents to see whose viewpoint carries the day.
20	20	"Myth America"	Dennis Rosenblatt	November 18, 1995
After a disappointing second-place finish in the 1990 Miss American Miss competition, Amber-Jo Lynch (Kathe Weeks) has reinvented herself as a champion for "beauty pageant survivors". But is her shtick just sour grapes? Winning contestant Keli Rich-Victor (Debbie James, a real-life former Miss USA finalist) and renowned pageant coach Tex Guy (D. Ewing Woodruff) both think so. To settle the matter, Dick stages a rematch, using Miller along with a selection of studio audience members as judges.
21	21	"Mistrial of the Century"	Dennis Rosenblatt	October 21, 1995
In a satire of the O.J. Simpson trial and the media circus that surrounded it, Dick dedicates this episode to a recap of the murder trial of the fictional martial arts movie star Jackie Wang. On the panel are prosecutor Patricia Stark (Brenda Varda), head defense attorney Jimmy Hawkins (Jay Arlen Jones), and "hostile witness extraordinaire" Tito Palin (Jon Beauregard), each of whom help recount Wang's desperate efforts to cover up his homosexuality, the ambiguous outcome of the ensuing murder trial, and what they've been up to since the hubbub died down. Note: Robert Alan Beuth makes his Night Stand debut in this episode, portraying Donny, a former Wang juror-turned-bestselling author. Shortly thereafter, Beuth would replace Peter Siragusa in the recurring role of Mueller, Dick's loyal but perpetually abused showrunner.
22	22	"Post Office Show"	Dennis Rosenblatt	October 28, 1995
Ex-letter carrier Terry Dennio (Joe Tabb) has been fired from his job, but no one can agree on why: he assumes it's because he moonlights as a male stripper and centerfold model for Sweaty Hombres magazine; his supervisor Rhonda (Anne Bloom) cites poor work performance; his coworker-turned-paramour Carla Barbieri (Lisa Gorlitsky) claims it was in retaliation for rejecting Rhonda's sexual advances. Either way, Terry is threatening a million-dollar lawsuit for wrongful termination, and Dick is left with the unenviable task of talking down both him and studio audience member Henry (Christopher Carroll): a disgruntled postal worker of the suicidal, rather than homicidal, variety.
23	23	"Illegal Alien Star Search"	Dennis Rosenblatt	November 11, 1995
Dick takes aim at America's burgeoning anti-immigration movement in typically irreverent fashion: by staging an "Illegal Alien Star Search" where the winner receives a green card and the losers face immediate deportation courtesy of INS field director Colin Brown (James F. Dean), who just so happens to be part of today's studio audience. Contestants include Vietnamese-born cabaret singer Nookie Lee Jones (Lisa Inouye), Dhallywood actor Lockschlemanon Quingbadderdashee (Leon Fermanian), straight-outta-Copenhagen porn star Xenaphoba (Susanna Voltaire), and German-speaking stand-up comedian Gunther Johann (Phil Hartman).
24	24	"Soiled Cloth"	Dennis Rosenblatt	November 4, 1995
Tackling the thorny issue of clergy sex scandals, Dick interviews Beth Ann McClear (Leslie Windram), author of a tell-all book recounting the string of torrid love affairs she'd carried on with a parade of prominent religious leaders; Rev. Martin N. Lewis (Michael Leopard), an ex-televangelist who parlayed the notoriety of his own scandalous downfall into a lucrative apology tour, and Didi (Ria Pavia), a college co-ed who claims to have been groped by a Buddhist monk (Dana Lee) on an airplane. Note: This episode marks Peter Siragusa's final appearance in the role of Miller.
25	25	"Athletes as Role Models"	Dennis Rosenblatt	January 13, 1996
Society tends to idealize sports superstars as paragons of leadership and virtue, but given all their well-publicized antics, is that the correct approach? Veteran ESPN reporter Fran Howard (Tembi Locke) says no, and cites Dick's next guest, basketball great Donald "X-Man" Fisher (Josef Cannon, parodying Dennis Rodman), as a perfect example. We also hear from Margo Johnston (Trasy Broussard), a "sports groupie" who's written a tell-all book detailing her trysts with a Who's Who of professional athletes. Note: This episode is the first for which Robert Alan Beuth is credited in the role of Mueller. However, the character would not actually appear on screen until several episodes later.
26	26	"Strippers Are Ruining My Marriage"	Dennis Rosenblatt	January 13, 1996
On the panel are Barbara (Leslie Sachs), to whom the episode's titular predicament applies; her husband Steve (Ivan Allen), who defends his daily trips to the Thong Kong Club as harmless fun, and Libby (Lisa Boyle), Steve's favorite dancer at said club. The ensuing debate seems stuck at an impasse until Dr. Lonnie Lanier arrives with one of his trademark out-of-left-field solutions.
27	27	"The Self-Improvement Show"	Dennis Rosenblatt	January 27, 1996
Dick shines the spotlight on the self-help industry, with panelists Robin Anthony (Randal Keith) and Teri Cole Williamson (Jodie Fisher) butting heads over their contrasting approaches to helping clients maximize their potential — as well as their own shared romantic history. Whose theory works best? Enter Lester (George "Buck" Flower), a homeless man whom Dick has recruited off a local street corner to serve as their mutual test subject.
28	28	"Are Talk Shows Out of Control?"	Dennis Rosenblatt	January 20, 1996
Debating the question in the episode title are activist Donna Wilder (Deborah Driggs), who complains that typical daytime syndicated fare is corrosive to common decency and singles Night Stand out for particular scorn, and Zach (Deron McBee), a male stripper and perennial talk show guest who dismisses the controversy as harmless fun. Naturally, Dick takes the opportunity to deflect all of Donna's criticism onto his arch-rival Jerry Springer — that is, until Jerry himself makes a surprise appearance on the panel to settle the score. Note: This episode features Robert Alan Beuth's first on-screen appearance as Mueller.
29	29	"Hate Thy Neighbor"	Dennis Rosenblatt	January 27, 1996
The town of Morningwood is an idyllic slice of picket-fence suburbia — with the exception of the Clampulett place, where patriarch Turk (Andrew Craig) stores rusted-out cars on his front lawn and the family pit bull is left to bark and howl all night. The straightlaced Montagues from next door have had it up to here, but complicating matters is the budding romance between Pumpkin (Jennifer Lyons) and Tyler (Adam Consolo), the teenage children of the respective households. Solution? Dr. Lonnie Lanier proposes a game of "Feuding Families" where the loser puts their house up for sale and leaves town. The parents are ready and raring to go, but what about the young star-crossed lovers?
30	30	"Sex in Washington, D.C."	Dennis Rosenblatt	January 20, 1996
A political scandal plays out on the Night Stand panel as Capitol Hill intern Julie Douda (Elizabeth Low) recounts the lurid details of the sexual harassment suit she's filed against her employer: popular senator Daniel Handelmayer (Arthur Roberts). Naturally, the senator and his wife (Faith Quabius) are on hand to defend themselves, and there's also the question of what role Julie's attorney — noted feminist activist Connie Croydon (Staci Greason) — might play in this whole sordid affair.
31	31	"The Unwed Mothers Show"	?	February 3, 1996
Juggling career and family is challenging enough for a woman with a partner, but real estate developer Kathy (Donna Cherry) is so frustrated with the dating scene that she's sworn off marriage entirely and vows to go it alone as a single mother. Backing her up is relationship expert-turned-fertility magnate Mattie Gelman, who's recruited four would-be donors from the studio audience for an American Gladiators-style competition to see who'll be the father. Presenting a fairly unhinged counterargument is family-values activist Grant Cossell (Dee Bradley Baker), whose angry rants about the state of modern morality ultimately devolve into a series of rapid-fire voice impersonations of old cartoon characters.
32	32	"Staff Talent Show"	Dennis Rosenblatt	January 27, 1996
In which the Night Stand cameras are trained on the unsung talents of the folks who usually work behind the scenes. Vying for a cool $160 prize purse are Monique (March Melilli), Dick's personal assistant who doubles as a contortionist; loyal showrunner Mueller, who shows off his bloodhound-like skill for detecting poultry by scent alone; set decorator Ricky Carlisle (Deryl Carroll), performing selections from his one-man show Trapeze Boy; jazz trumpeter-turned-craft service supervisor Scotty Kingman (Cal Gibson), and Jimmy Chevette (Michael J. Anderson), the show's head of security and self-styled "Pocket Goulet" who's afflicted with dwarfism yet, to quote his signature song, "big where it counts".
33	33	"Dream a Little Dream"	Dennis Rosenblatt	February 10, 1996
Dick teams up with famous television star Charlene Tilton, who's paying her success forward with a new charitable foundation dedicated to helping others realize their dreams. Falling victim to Dick's general incompetence are Marta (Magda Harout), a Czechoslovak refugee separated from her husband during a harrowing escape through the Iron Curtain; Danny (Vic Wilson), who's looking to get even with his high school bully Butch (Steve O'Connor); Rusty "Hellcat" Robinson (Bob Sarlatte), an ex-daredevil who was rendered quadriplegic after an accident and is now trying to break into comedy, and — ultimately — Charlene herself.
34	34	"Love on the Internet"	Dennis Rosenblatt	February 10, 1996
Dick explores the perks and pitfalls of the episode's titular subject, which was still somewhat of a novel concept back in the heady days of 1996. On hand to assist are Wally Theodore (Ben Livingston), whose chat room paramour isn't quite what he first expected; Gloria Holt (Beth Tegarden), who still professes virginity despite having had cybersex with over 2,500 men; sex therapist and inventor Frank Kann (William Smith Keane), touting some of the newest high-tech gadgets from the Stiffer Image catalog, and the Sullivans (David Kaufman and Lisa Rotondi), a couple who met, courted, and were married online and are now meeting in person for the first time — to get a divorce. Note: This episode is notorious among fans for an unscripted wardrobe malfunction suffered by actor Kevin Light, who plays the role of Kal, a male model and Night Stand production assistant whom Dick brings onto the panel in an effort to impress the aforementioned Gloria. The script called for Dick to tear off Kal's shirt and trousers; however, on the first take, his underwear was accidentally removed as well, briefly exposing his genitals. Although the scene was subsequently reshot, footage of the audience's shocked reaction from the initial version was incorporated into the episode's final cut — and the entire outtake has occasionally resurfaced on blooper specials such as It'll Be Alright on the Night.
35	35	"Salute to Getting Off Easy"	?	February 3, 1996
Dick reunites the cast of his favorite family sitcom, Getting Off Easy (whose premise seems to be basically a cross between Diff'rent Strokes and Mr. Belvedere), only to find its former child actors embittered, bickering, and victimized by the usual post-fame downfalls. Their TV dad (Paul Elder) shows up with the exciting news that the network is interested in reviving the series, but the panel's final guest (Florence Henderson, appearing as herself) has a better idea: they'll all come to live with her at "Brady House", a newly founded transitional facility where a remote-control laugh track and other familiar amenities help ex-sitcom stars bridge the gap between life on set and in the real world. Note: This episode is especially noted by fans for its profusion of celebrity guest appearances. Aside from Henderson, the cast includes Anthony Anderson in one of his earliest television roles as Mickey, Getting Off Easy's erstwhile breakout star, as well as entertainment journalist Nancy O'Dell as a studio audience member who poses a question to the panel toward the end of the second segment.
36	36	"Is MVT Good for America?"	Dennis Rosenblatt	February 17, 1996
Today's panel tackles the controversy around the raunchy programming on MVT (Night Stand's in-universe analogue for MTV), and airheaded veejay Eisenhower (Maureen Muldoon) is taking flak from both sides: from parents' activist Mary Jo Spitz (Melissa Christopher), who was spurred to action after her son injured himself imitating the antics of cartoon duo Pork-Head and Weiner, and simultaneously from MC Carjak, who is crying discrimination after the network banned the video for his latest single, "Fuck Everyone". Also making an appearance is media mogul Sumner Winterfall (Paul Rothery), who vows to put an end to all the indecency — but some question his true motivations.
37	37	"The Making of a President"	Dennis Rosenblatt	February 24, 1996
Inspired by his feud with the board of his local homeowners' association, Dick devotes a show to exploring the ingredients that go into a successful political campaign. Panelist Mary Madison (Wendy Pitts) starts off discussing Politics as an Aphrodisiac — her recently published memoir that recounts her career as a leading image consultant — but soon enough finds herself grooming Dick for his own campaign for the HOA presidency, facing off against incumbent Allen D. Generis (Robert Stephen Ryan). Of course, this necessitates finding Dick a suitable First Lady, with a trio of candidates (Jill Lesly Jones; Faye Dout; J. J. North) duly auditioned.
38	38	"UFO Mother Show"	Dennis Rosenblatt	February 17, 1996
Prim-and-proper Catholic schoolgirl Mary (Heather O'Ryan) has fallen pregnant — allegedly by an alien who abducted her as she drove her car along a desolate road. Her therapist (Howard S. Miller) buys her story, but her sister Maggie (Judie Aronson) doesn't, and it's tearing their close-knit family apart. Who can sort through this mess? Dick recruits prominent illusionist and skeptic The Astounding Andy for his debut appearance on the Night Stand panel. Also on hand is former Night Court star Harry Anderson, making what might be the most (intentionally) awkward and pointless celebrity guest spot in television history.
39	39	"The Secret Crush Show"	Dennis Rosenblatt	February 24, 1996
In which Dick the matchmaker brings his viewers face to face with the special someones whom they've always fancied, but never had the nerve to approach. Soap opera heartthrob Sean Kanan (playing himself) proves quite a surprise for his favorite bank teller, Wendy (Gwendolyn Sanford), while recently divorced high school math teacher Elaine Moritz (Tina Arning) is left with the unenviable task of letting one of her own students (Danny Strong) down easy. But the biggest bombshell of all is dropped by one of Dick's own employees: Night Stand costume designer Robert (Michael Todd Sandman).
40	40	"Affirmative Action Show"	Dennis Rosenblatt	March 2, 1996
Dick introduces us to Lucy (Sharon Lee Jones), who claims to have been passed over for a job as a stripper due to race-based hiring quotas, and Chanté (Lynette Lane), the Black dancer who took her place and dismisses the whole dispute as a case of sour grapes. Rounding out the panel is our old friend Bob, owner of "Lapland USA" — the strip club at the center of the maelstrom — who, as usual, vacillates wildly between melodramatic self-pity and repeatedly promoting his business by name to Night Stand viewers. Bob swears he'd gladly hire both if only his hands weren't tied by government regulations... but are they really?
41	41	"Blowup in a Brothel"	Dennis Rosenblatt	April 27, 1996
Dick takes his show on the road to Eurethra, Tennessee, a small town plagued by a big mystery. Hometown native Eve Summers (Julie Uribe) recently came back to open the Muskrat Ranch, a brothel that she credits with helping the local economy get back on its feet after years of decline — that is, until a suspicious explosion blew the place to smithereens. Whodunit? On the panel to protest their innocence are Mayor John Zedotes (Bob Rudd); local activist Darleena Sammons (Michelle Watkins), whose two-timing husband was a regular Muskrat Ranch customer, and Burt Edmunds (Bob Mack), former owner of a topless doughnut shop that was bankrupted by the new competition.
42	42	"Infomercial Addicts"	Dennis Rosenblatt	March 2, 1996
Dick introduces us to Wally (Michael Bofshever) and Joan (Joleen Lutz), whose marriage is in trouble over the latter's habit of obsessively purchasing every dubious product she sees advertised on late-night television infomercials. Can all these gadgets really improve people's lives, or is the whole thing just a big rip-off? Next up on the panel are prolific TV huckster Mike Reeby (Brett Baer) and sexy spokesmodel Julianne Frye (Tricia Lee Pascoe), who do their best to defend their industry's reputation while simultaneously dodging Dick's harebrained new product ideas and Wally's persistent attempts to get refunded for his wife's defective "Tann-Tastic Home Tanning Salon".
43	43	"Greek Dreams"	Dennis Rosenblatt	May 4, 1996
Tackling the hot-button controversies surrounding college fraternities and sororities is the cast of the award-winning documentary Greek Dreams: Steven Leeky (Richard Israel), a nerdy freshman pledge to the Alpha Beta house whose onscreen humiliation during "Hell Week" led him to file a $5 million lawsuit; Cyndi (Sunny Doench-Knox), an Eta Pi sister with a bone to pick about the film's sexist take on sorority life, and Tad (Chris Wiehl), Alpha Beta's local chapter president who's on hand to argue the counterpoint. Last but not least, Dick rounds out the panel with his own former frat brother, Alan "Cobra" Slaughter (Michael Piontek), whose life has taken a few unexpected turns since their college days.
44	44	"The Expert Show"	Dennis Rosenblatt	May 18, 1996
The ever-popular Bob returns to the Night Stand panel once again, this time to implore Dick to help him save his marriage, as his wife Darla (Sharise Baker) has finally had enough of his philandering ways. As the episode's title implies, Dick pulls out all the stops, gamely recruiting a Who's Who of his favorite recurring guests to weigh in: Dr. Susan Sonspeen unsurprisingly urges Darla to stand up for herself and leave the bum once and for all, while Mattie Gelman holds out hope that the marriage may be salvageable yet, and The Astounding Andy brings the impasse to a typically ludicrous resolution through the power of hypnosis.
45	45	"Dick's High School Reunion"	Dennis Rosenblatt	May 25, 1996
It's a blast from the past as Dick stages his 20-year high school reunion on the Night Stand panel, with a full retinue of Southwest Ashtabula luminaries on hand to catch up on life after graduation. Head cheerleader and homecoming queen Elaine Zimmerman (Jane Higginson) recounts how a failed date with Dick drove her to celibacy and lesbianism, but our host isn't convinced — nor is her ex-boyfriend, football star and class clown Adam Walchowski (Gary Epp). Meanwhile, Linda Laird (Kerrie Klark), the formerly obese senior class president, shows up looking fit and fabulous... a little too fit and fabulous, say her classmates.
46	46	"Mail Order Brides"	Dennis Rosenblatt	May 18, 1996
Dick plunges into the seedy world of "mail-order" spouses by way of an interview with Melissa (Colleen Tate), whose heart melted at the rhapsodic letters supposedly sent by a hunky Latin lover named "Armando", but who was met instead by Coco (Glen Chin), a fat goofball who nonetheless pleads for a chance to satisfy her desires. Playing defense is Rod Weiner (Gregg Binkley) — owner of the International House of Spouses, the company at the center of the dispute — and his own mail-order bride, the suspiciously subservient Mee Tang (Karen Kim).
47	47	"Gold-Diggers of 1996"	Dennis Rosenblatt	May 11, 1996
The episode title references an old Warner Bros. musical revue from the 1930s, but the plot is a sendup of the then-current Anna Nicole Smith/J. Howard Marshall controversy. On the panel is Lorelei Bernstein (Donna Eskra), a blonde bombshell whose marriage to 92-year-old shoe tycoon Sidney "Buddy" Bernstein starts to make a lot more sense when it's revealed that he willed her his entire $250 million fortune shortly before his death in a grisly skydiving accident. Did she marry him for his money — or, even worse, have him killed? Airing their respective suspicions are the deceased's eldest son "Little Buddy" (Barry Pearl) and housekeeper Fifi LeBustier (Heidi Lenhart).
48	48	"American Probe"	Larry Strawther	June 1, 1996
In which we are reintroduced to Holly Montagna Rancheros (Darla Haun), who since we last saw her has left the world of investigative reporting behind and teamed up with Dick as cohost of American Probe: a new series that promises to do for tabloid newsmagazines what Night Stand did for daytime talk shows (that is, satirize them without mercy). As such, Dick foregoes the usual panel discussion and instead treats his studio audience to a screening of the pilot, where timely topics such as the militia movement and Bill Clinton's sex scandals are handled with the requisite flippancy. There's even a celebrity gossip segment hosted by Francis DeMule (Neil Dickson, taking over the role from David Jahn).
49	49	"Sexaholics"	Joseph Carolei	September 16, 1995
Delving headlong into an exploration of the perils and pitfalls of sexual addiction, Dick introduces us to Amanda (Carolyn Hennesy), an ex-dentist done in by her habit of molesting anesthetized patients; Jim (Christopher Darga, playing an early version of the character later known as Bob), who both laments yet also seems suspiciously proud of the "sickness" that's led him to sleep with 12,000 different women; Jane (Jane Abbott), leader of a sex-positive activist group dubbed "Slut Nation", and Ed (Jim Doughan), who's tasked with confessing his habit of compulsive masturbation to his oblivious wife Ruth Ann (Kathleen M. Darcy). On hand as well to help ringlead this circus is Dr. Lonnie Lanier. Note: Despite its numerical placement near the end of the Season 1 production order, "Sexaholics" was actually filmed as Night Stand's pilot before being retooled for broadcast, and in most markets aired as the series premiere in conjunction with "Dating". As such, the set design and graphical chirons differ noticeably from later episodes. Moreover, rather than Miller or Mueller, Dick's assistant in this episode is an unseen character referred to as "Hal"; nonetheless, Peter Siragusa does make an uncredited appearance as a member of the studio audience.
50	50	"Is Bigger Better?"	Dennis Rosenblatt	May 4, 1996
The question in the title refers to breasts — specifically those of Melanie (Lizzie Murray), a flat-chested cocktail waitress who's contemplating implant surgery on the suggestion of her boyfriend. She swears it's more a matter of her own self-esteem than satisfying a man's desires, but feminist activist Rene Sayer (Kris McGaha) isn't buying it. Meanwhile, perennial studio audience fixture Vinny makes his debut as a panelist, detailing his plight as a struggling drag queen who hopes breast augmentation is the key to career success. And as usual, plastic surgeon extraordinaire Dr. Hamilton George is happy to accommodate both prospective patients: just say the word, he says, and he'll do the honors. Note: Vinny's "showstopping" Rosie O'Donnell impersonation, which he performs for the audience at the beginning of the third segment, is portrayed by O'Donnell herself. According to Stack, her cameo, along with most other appearances on Night Stand by big-name celebrities, came about as repayment of a favor owed to someone on the show's staff.
51	51	"Follow-Up Show"	Dennis Rosenblatt	May 11, 1996
It's a colorful cast of characters that has come and gone from the Night Stand panel so far this season, and Dick dedicates this half-hour to checking in with a few notable past guests to see what's new in their lives. Father Chip (Hal Sparks), innovator of the drive-thru confessional, returns to promote his new fashion line, Catholic heavy metal band, and various and sundry other ventures, while Bachelor #3 and his fiancée Diana (Ginny Schreiber) regale us with the story of their whirlwind romance that began on this very stage, and Jonathon Felcher (Ant) has gone from flamboyant to suspiciously straightlaced in the wake of his newly launched campaign for an Orange County congressional seat.
52	52	"Clip Show"	Larry Strawther	May 25, 1996
After a band of militant feminist protestors led by Dr. Susan Sonspeen barricades Dick out of his studio, he's forced to instead film today's episode from his favorite watering hole down the street. And without any panelists or studio audience, what better opportunity to treat viewers to a good old-fashioned clip show recapping some of the highlights of Night Stand's first season? That's exactly what Dick proceeds to do, with the help of Mueller and buxom barkeep Jennifer (Jennifer Barlow).

=== Season 2 (1996–97) ===
No. overall	No. in season	Title	Directed by	Original release date
53	1	"Uniting Loved Ones"	Dennis Rosenblatt	September 14, 1996
Night Stand's second season begins on a heartwarming note, with the panel first given over to the "Lady in the Glasses" from the studio audience, who excitedly reveals herself as not only the president of Dick's fan club but also the pen pal-turned-fiancée of newly paroled murderer Raymond "Mad Cow" Stephenoff (Tom Towles). A less successful onstage reunion, sadly, is that of adoptee Annie (Jeanne Benedict) with birth mother Mabel Ann Davenport (Edie McClurg), whose impositions grow more burdensome by the minute. Finally, we get to witness Dick's first face-to-face encounter with Courtney (Gigi Ong), the young refugee he's been sponsoring through an international children's charity.
54	2	"Who's Killing at the Tickle Bin?"	Dennis Rosenblatt	September 28, 1996
Dick leads us through a hard-hitting probe into the scandal that's gripping L.A.'s premier comedy club, where a string of performers have died under mysterious circumstances. Pleading their cases on the panel are sexy barmaid Andrea Feeklestein (Ashley Borden) and Tickle Bin owner Shotzi Lake (Pamela Rowan doing a lighthearted caricature of real-life Comedy Store impresario Mitzi Shore): both prime suspects due respectively to Andrea's sexual liaisons with all six victims and Shotzi's bitter rivalry with a crosstown competitor. For a bit of levity, we also get a look at the Tickle Bin's latest headliner: Jimmy Mullican (David Strassman), whose ventriloquist act soon takes a dark turn.
55	3	"The Lottery Show"	Dennis Rosenblatt	December 14, 1996
Service station manager Mah Heinie (Ossie Mair) borrowed a dollar from his co-worker Pud (Richard Speight Jr.) to buy a lottery ticket that ended up winning the $30 million jackpot, and now the question of who's entitled to the money is driving a wedge into their friendship. Egging Pud on is his newfound fiancée Mimi (Cherie Huet), who swears she's not a gold digger — just a budding entrepreneur hoping to get her newly invented exercise contraption on the market. With only four days left to redeem the ticket, Dick proposes to settle things by way of a Price Is Right-style quiz game centered around their store's product line, whose winner gets not only the $30 million but also Mimi's hand in marriage.
56	4	"Urban Renewal"	Dennis Rosenblatt	September 21, 1996
Sandra Tyler (Cynthia Steele) is a single mom on a mission to rid her once-idyllic neighborhood of the crime and depravity that have plagued it ever since the opening of "Lapland USA": the strip club down the street whose owner, Bob, is no stranger to the Night Stand panel. Sandra and her activist colleagues have forged powerful connections among city leadership and brought the wrecking ball to Lapland's doorstep, but Bob has an ace up his sleeve: he's taken on her son Sammy (David Shofner) as a protégé, and even offered to fund his university education.
