= The Tony Danza Show (1997 TV series) =

1997 American sitcom TV series

- Genre: Sitcom
- Created by: Ian Gurvitz
- Starring: Tony Danza; Majandra Delfino; Dean Stockwell; Maria Canals; Ashley Malinger
- Opening theme: "We've Got Love"
- Composer: Jonathan Wolff
- Country of origin: United States
- Original language: English
- No. of seasons: 1
- No. of episodes: 14 (9 unaired)

Production
- Executive producers: Ian Gurvitz; Tony Danza; Dava Savel
- Producers: Tracey Ormandy; Mark Wilding; Jack Amiel; Michael Begler
- Camera setup: Multi-camera
- Running time: 30 minutes
- Production companies: Katie Face Productions; Kokoro Productions; NBC Studios; Columbia TriStar Television

Original release
- Network: NBC
- Release: September 24 – December 10, 1997

The Tony Danza Show is an American sitcom television series starring Tony Danza, Majandra Delfino, Dean Stockwell, Ashley Malinger, Maria Canals, and Shaun Weiss that aired from September 24 to December 10, 1997 on NBC. The show aired 5 episodes before being cancelled, leaving 9 episodes unaired.

Tony Danza won "Favorite Male Performer in a New TV Series" at the 24th People's Choice Awards for his performance in the show.

== Premise ==
Tony DiMeo (Danza), single father of two daughters, is a sportswriter who can't use a computer. Tina (Delfino) is a rebellious 16-year-old and Mickey (Malinger) is an 11-year-old hypochondriac.

== Cast ==
=== Main ===
- Tony Danza as Tony DiMeo
- Maria Canals as Carmen Cruz
- Shaun Weiss as Stuey Mandelker
- Majandra Delfino as Tina DiMeo
- Ashley Malinger as Mickey DiMeo
- Dean Stockwell as Frank DiMeo

=== Guests ===
- Danny Mann ("Pilot", "C'gar Face")
- Carol Kane as Simka Gravaas ("The Milk Run")
- Larry Hankin as Gary ("Wired")
- Ellen Crawford as Eugenia Cooper ("Pilot")
- Karl Malone as Karl Malone ("With Your Guest Host Tony DiMeo...")
- William Marquez as Carlos Cruz ("A Marriage Made in Miami")
- Dayton Callie as Uncle Lou ("A Christmas Story")
- Christopher Rich as Kyle Wentworth ("Sue You")
- Michelle Clunie as Maggie ("Vision Quest")
- E.E. Bell as F. Hillerman ("Take This Job and...")
- Rob Youngblood as Ricky Gibbs ("The Price of Dirty Laundry")
- Jose Canseco as Jose Canseco ("Mini-pause")
- Dave Winfield as Dave Winfield ("C'gar Face")
- Lynn Ann Leveridge as Patsy ("Stringers")
- Maria Falzone as Woman #1 ("Thanks... But No Thanksgiving")
- Joseph D. Reitman as Fritz ("With Your Guest Host Tony DiMeo...")
- Michelle Nicastro as Donna ("The Milk Run")
- Renee Victor as Lydia Cruz ("A Marriage Made in Miami")
- Emilio Borelli as Phil ("Wired")
- Phil Rizzuto as Phil Rizzuto ("Pilot")
- Phil Morris as Dale Turner ("Sue You")
- Robert Costanzo as Charlie Falcone ("C'gar Face")
- Jeanette Miller as Mrs. Naufman ("Take This Job and...")
- Larry Thomas as Man #1 ("Thanks... But No Thanksgiving")
- Steven Gilborn as Dr. Wagner ("Mini-pause")
- Shirley Prestia as Aunt Louise ("A Christmas Story")
- Maria Rangel as Inez ("Vision Quest")
- Timothy Elwell as Allie Watson ("Stringers")
- Frank Pesce as Guy ("Pilot")
- Stuart Nisbet as Elderly Man ("With Your Guest Host Tony DiMeo...")
- Eddie Garcia as Manny ("A Marriage Made in Miami")
- Mark Phinney as Delivery Guy ("Wired")
- Tracy Danza as Woman Costumer ("The Milk Run")
- Nancy Lenehan as Mrs. Erlich ("C'gar Face")
- Harry Van Gorkum as Malcolm ("Vision Quest")
- Marie Marshall as Susan ("A Christmas Story")
- Robert Michael Ryan as Player #1 ("Stringers")
- Jeremy Lawrence as Man #2 ("Thanks... But No Thanksgiving")
- Evander Holyfield as Evander Holyfield ("Sue You")
- Barry Kivel as Mr. Ho Ho ("Mini-pause")
- June Gable as Woman ("The Milk Run")
- Gigi Bermingham as Mrs. Cornbloom ("With Your Guest Host Tony DiMeo...")
- Richard Miro as Juan ("A Marriage Made in Miami")
- Nate Richert as Jason ("Mini-pause")
- Alexandra Wilson as Allison Paxton ("Vision Quest")
- Lamont Johnson as Ron Patterson ("C'gar Face")
- Patricia Lentz as Panicked Lady ("Thanks... But No Thanksgiving")
- Barry Heins as Man ("A Christmas Story")
- Fred Pinkard as Mr. Cheevers ("With Your Guest Host Tony DiMeo...")
- T.R. Richards as Mop Guy ("The Milk Run")
- Dora Taylor as Dora ("A Marriage Made in Miami")
- Molly Cheek as Laura Taylor ("Vision Quest")
- Clement Blake as Street Bum ("Thanks... But No Thanksgiving")
- Jonathan Fraser as Dr. Newman ("Mini-pause")
- Alma Beltran as Old Aunt ("A Marriage Made in Miami")
- Jon Simmons as Middle Aged Man ("With Your Guest Host Tony DiMeo...")
- Art LaFleur as Mr. Paxton ("Vision Quest")
- Reni Santoni as Uncle Ernesto ("C'gar Face")
- Barry Wiggins as Dr. Cashin ("Mini-pause")
- Wesley Leong as Doctor ("With Your Guest Host Tony DiMeo...")
- Ramiro González as Ricardo ("A Marriage Made in Miami")
- Kaley Cuoco as Pammie Green ("Mini-pause")
- Marla Adams as Mrs. Paxton ("Vision Quest")
- Alan Young as Dr. Harris ("Mini-pause")
- Thomas Ian Nicholas as Brandon (Uncredited in "With Your Guest Host Tony DiMeo...")
- Christopher Maleki as Adam (Uncredited in "The Milk Run")
- Lisa Glass as Sexy Caller (Uncredited in "With Your Guest Host Tony DiMeo...")

== Theme song ==
The theme song for The Tony Danza Show is "We've Got Love".

== Episodes ==
| No. | Title | Directed by | Written by | Original release date | Viewers (millions) |
|---|---|---|---|---|---|
| 1 | "Pilot" | Jay Sandrich | Ian Gurvitz | September 24, 1997 | 9.92 |
A free-lance sportswriter (Tony Danza) raises two daughters in New York City. Guest Stars: Danny Mann, Ellen Crawford, Phil Rizzuto, and Frank Pesce
| 2 | "Wired" | Gail Mancuso | Ian Gurvitz | October 8, 1997 | 7.46 |
Frank and Stuey help Tony juggle domestic duties and his editorial deadline. Guest Stars: Larry Hankin, Emilio Borelli, and Mark Phinney
| 3 | "With Your Guest Host Tony DiMeo..." | Gail Mancuso | Jeff Abugov | October 15, 1997 | 5.92 |
Karl Malone is in the studio when Tony fills in as host of a radio show. Guest Stars: Karl Malone, Joseph D. Reitman, Stuart Nisbet, Gigi Bermingham, Fred Pinkard, Jon Simmons, Wesley Leong, Thomas Ian Nicholas (uncredited), and Lisa Glass (uncredited)
| 4 | "The Milk Run" | Michael Lessac | Dava Savel | December 3, 1997 | 8.69 |
Tony trades stories with Simka (Carol Kane), a sympathetic cabbie. Guest Stars: Carol Kane, Michelle Nicastro, Tracy Danza, June Gable, T.R. Richards, and Christopher Maleki (uncredited)
| 5 | "A Marriage Made in Miami" | James Hampton | Dava Savel | December 10, 1997 | 7.54 |
Carmen's father plans a wedding after he misinterprets Tony's praise of her. Guest Stars: William Marquez, Renee Victor, Eddie Garcia, Richard Miro, Dora Taylor, Alma Beltran, and Ramiro González
| 6 | "C'gar Face" | Michael Lessac | Jack Amiel, Michael Begler | Unaired | N/A |
Mickey tries to buy her way out of gym class with her father's Cuban cigars. Guest Stars: Danny Mann, Dave Winfield, Robert Costanzo, Nancy Lenehan, Lamont Johnson, and Reni Santoni
| 7 | "Sue You" | Alan Myerson | Jennifer Quine | Unaired | N/A |
Tony faces a lawsuit after he ejects Evander Holyfield's attorney from his home. Guest Stars: Christopher Rich, Phil Morris, and Evander Holyfield
| 8 | "Thanks... But No Thanksgiving" | Michael Lessac | Andrea Abbate | Unaired | N/A |
Tony and Tina clash when Tina wants to spend Thanksgiving with a friend, instead of with him. Guest Stars: Maria Falzone, Larry Thomas, Jeremy Lawrence, Patricia Lentz, and Clement Blake
| 9 | "Take This Job and..." | Rich Correll | Mark Wilding | Unaired | N/A |
When Tina complains that Tony is always tying up the phone line, he tells her to get a job so she can pay for her own line. Guest Stars: E.E. Bell and Jeanette Miller
| 10 | "A Christmas Story" | Brian K. Roberts | Charlotte Brown | Unaired | N/A |
Tony's Christmas turns less than merry when his wife, Susan (Marie Marshall), calls from Paris with a gift for the girls: a chance to spend the holidays abroad with her. Guest Stars: Dayton Callie, Shirley Prestia, Marie Marshall, and Barry Heins
| 11 | "Mini-pause" | Brian K. Roberts | Craig Hoffman | Unaired | N/A |
Mickey's hypochrondria comes full circle with the advent of her birthday, to the point of begging Tony to take her to a doctor. Guest Stars: Jose Canseco, Steven Gilborn, Barry Kivel, Nate Richert, Jonathan Fraser, Barry Wiggins, Kaley Cuoco, and Alan Young
| 12 | "The Price of Dirty Laundry" | Brian K. Roberts | Billiam Coronel | Unaired | N/A |
Carmen pitches a fit when she catches Tony meddling in her romance with a bad-news baseball star. Guest Star: Rob Youngblood
| 13 | "Stringers" | James Hampton | Jeff Abugov | Unaired | N/A |
Carmen lands a job as a reporter with Tony's help, but Tony is unimpressed with her work. Guest Stars: Lynn Ann Leveridge, Timothy Elwell, and Robert Michael Ryan
| 14 | "Vision Quest" | Alan Myerson | Jack Amiel, Michael Begler | Unaired | N/A |
Tony's vision of the perfect woman in Frank's bakery leads him to try his hand at dating again, to disastrous results. Guest Stars: Michelle Clunie, Maria Rangel, Harry Van Gorkum, Alexandra Wilson, Molly Cheek, Art LaFleur, and Marla Adams
