= Cattrall =

Cattrall is a surname. Notable people with the surname include:

- Kim Cattrall (born 1956), English-born Canadian actress
- Robert Cattrall (born 1957), British field hockey player

== See also ==
- Catterall (surname)
