= Ryan Browning =

American politician

Member of the West Virginia House of Representatives from the 28th district
- Incumbent
- Assumed office July 3, 2024
- Preceded by: Mark Ross

Personal details
- Born: August 6th, 1981 Detroit, Michigan
- Party: Republican
- Education: West Virginia University Institute of Technology 2005
- Occupation: Commercial Insurance Producer, Entrepreneur

Ryan Browning is an American politician from West Virginia. He is a Republican and represents District 28 in the West Virginia House of Delegates since 2024.

== Life ==
Browning is a graduate of Spring Valley High School and West Virginia University Institute of Technology. In 2024, Governor Jim Justice appointed Browning to fill the vacancy created by Mark Ross.
