= Shirley Prestia =

American actress (1947–2011)

- Born: Shirley Rose Prestia; June 18, 1947; New Orleans, Louisiana, U.S.
- Died: October 8, 2011 (aged 64); New Orleans, Louisiana, U.S.
- Occupation: Actress
- Years active: 1976–2005

Shirley Rose Prestia (August 18, 1947 – October 6, 2011) was an American actress. She guest starred in a number of notable television series including Family Ties, Cheers, St. Elsewhere, The Golden Girls, The Facts of Life, 227, Mr. Belvedere, Babylon 5, L.A. Law, NYPD Blue, Step by Step, The Practice and among other series. Prestia also had recurring roles on the sitcoms Home Improvement (as Delores) and Dharma & Greg (as Janet).

She appeared in the films Final Analysis (1992), Hoffa (1992), Species (1995), Leave It to Beaver (1997), Wag the Dog (1997) and What Women Want (2000).

== Life and early career ==
Prestia was born in New Orleans, Louisiana. She graduated from Mount Carmel Academy high school. She is an alumna of California State University, Chico and graduated with a Bachelor of Arts degree in Theater Arts. Prestia was also one of the original members of The Groundlings comedy troupe. Shirley was a devoted member of Soka Gakkai International (SGI-USA) a Nichiren Buddhist organization, from whose fellow members she received spiritual comfort and sustained support.

== Later years and death ==
Prestia was diagnosed with brain cancer c. 2004. Due to the illness, she retired from acting, with her last acting credit appearing in the pilot episode of the sitcom The War at Home in 2005. She died on October 8, 2011, at age 64, in her hometown of New Orleans, after eight years of living with the disease.

== Filmography ==
Film
| Year | Title | Role | Notes |
|---|---|---|---|
| 1982 | Pandemonium | Morgue Attendant | |
| 1986 | Hollywood Zap! | Cashier | |
| 1991 | Write to Kill | Police Matron | Direct-to-video film |
| 1992 | Final Analysis | D.A. Kaufman | |
| 1992 | Hoffa | Hoffa's Secretary | |
| 1995 | Species | Victoria Roth, Ph.D. | |
| 1997 | Leave It to Beaver | Claire Hensler | |
| 1997 | Wag the Dog | Crossfire Moderator | |
| 2000 | What Women Want | Coffee Shop Customer | |
| 2001 | The Shrink Is In | Woman in Elevator | |
| 2002 | Mackenheim | (unknown) | Short film |

Television
| Year | Title | Role | Notes |
|---|---|---|---|
| 1976 | How to Break Up a Happy Divorce | (uncredited) | Television film |
| 1982 | Adams House | Mrs. Drucker | Unsold CBS pilot |
| 1983 | Bare Essence | (unknown) | Episode: "Hour Four" |
| 1984 | Cheeseball Presents | (unknown) | TV special, also co-writer |
| 1984 | St. Elsewhere | Judith Phelps | Episode: "Girls Just Want to Have Fun" |
| 1985 | E/R | Irene | Recurring role, 5 episodes |
| 1985 | Family Ties | Receptionist | Episode: "Birth of a Keaton: Part 2" |
| 1985 | Benson | Mrs. Riddle | Episode: "The Oval Office" |
| 1985 | Santa Barbara | Peter's Landlady | Episode #1.172 |
| 1985 | Fame | The Nurse | Episode: "Reflections" |
| 1986 | Mr. Belvedere | Mrs. Rondanello | Episode: "The Teacher" |
| 1986 | The Golden Girls | Zelda | Episode: "The Way We Meet" |
| 1988 | The Facts of Life | Miss O' Donnell | Episode: "The Beginning of the End" |
| 1988 | Mama's Family | Louise Kambeck | Episode: "Found Money" |
| 1988 | Cheers | Nurse | Episode: "How to Win Friends and Electrocute People" |
| 1989 | On the Television | Various characters | Appeared in 4 episodes |
| 1989 | Married... with Children | Marsha | Episode: "Here's Looking at You, Kid" |
| 1989 | 227 | Peggy Ann Garrison | Episode: "A Pampered Tale" |
| 1989 | Night Court | Madame Rochelle | Episode: "Come Back to the Five and Dime, Stephen King, Stephen King" |
| 1989 | Mr. Belvedere | Woman #2 | Episode: "Fixed" |
| 1989 | ALF | Delores | Episode: "It's My Party" |
| 1990 | Thirtysomething | Focus Group Member | Episode: "Pulling Away" |
| 1990 | Knots Landing | Shopper #1 | Episode: "Do Not Attempt to Remove" |
| 1990 | The Fanelli Boys | Nina Donatellii | Episodes: "Pilot" and "A Very Fanelli Christmas" |
| 1990 | Ann Jillian | (unknown) | Episode: "A Homecoming" |
| 1991 | Brooklyn Bridge | Librarian | Episode: "Boys of Summer" |
| 1992 | Baby Talk | Irene | Episode: "The Littlest Shoplifter" |
| 1992 | For Richer, for Poorer | Waitress | Television film |
| 1992 | A Murderous Affair: The Carolyn Warmus Story | The Beautician | Television film |
| 1993 | Almost Home | Female Customer | Episode: "Girl and Boy" |
| 1993 | Sisters | Margaret | Episode: "Dear Georgie" |
| 1993 | L.A. Law | Nina Coffey | Episode: "Foreign Co-respondent" |
| 1993 | Mad About You | Tourist | Episode: "Natural History" |
| 1993 | Family Album | Mrs. Ferguson | Episode: "Salon, Farewell, Auf Wiedersehn, Goodbye" |
| 1993 | Joe's Life | Dr. Sykes | Episode: "You Can't Take This Job... Period" |
| 1994 | Step by Step | Betty Jenkins | Episode: "Pretty Woman" |
| 1994 | The Mommies | Calorie Crunchers Rep | Episode: "The Exercist" |
| 1994 | Menendez: A Killing in Beverly Hills | Jose's Secretary | Television film |
| 1994 | Martin | Madame Anaconda | Episode: "In Search of Martin" |
| 1994 | Hardball | Bird Woman | Episode: "Whose Strike Is It Anyway?" |
| 1994 | Party of Five | Demanding Customer | Episode: "Worth Waiting For" |
| 1994 | NYPD Blue | Jury Foreperson | Episodes: "Trials and Tribulations" and "For Whom the Skill Rolls" |
| 1995 | Platypus Man | Nurse Simms | Episode: "The Apartment Show" |
| 1995 | Sherman Oaks | Kac | Episode: "Killer Breasts" |
| 1995–1997 | Night Stand with Dick Dietrick | Dr. Mattie Gelman | Recurring role, 5 episodes |
| 1995–1999 | Home Improvement | Delores | Recurring role, 8 episodes |
| 1995 | Hope & Gloria | Eleanore | Episode: "The Dupree Family Christmas" |
| 1995 | Can't Hurry Love | Supervisor | Episode: "A Very Kafka Christmas" |
| 1996 | Dream On | Maureen | Episode: "Springtime for Tupper" |
| 1996 | Babylon 5 | Barbara Cooper | Episode: "Shadow Dancing" |
| 1996 | Caroline in the City | Ruth Glickman | Episode: "Caroline and the Nice Jewish Boy" |
| 1997 | Frasier | Saleswoman | Episode: "My Fair Frasier" |
| 1997 | Alright Already | Charlotte | Episode: "Again with the Funeral" |
| 1998 | Suddenly Susan | Shirley | Episode: "Not in This Life" |
| 1998 | Murphy Brown | Woman | Episode: "Second Time Around" |
| 1998 | The Tony Danza Show | Aunt Louise | Episode: "A Christmas Story" |
| 1999 | Will & Grace | Mrs. Pressman | Episode: "Election" |
| 1999 | The Practice | Attorney Abby Smythe | Episode: "Legacy" |
| 2000 | Cursed | Secretary | Pilot episode |
| 2000 | Time of Your Life | Arnetta | Episodes: "The Time They Decide to Date" and "The Time They Cheated" |
| 2001 | Charmed | Fran Peters | Episode: "Wrestling with Demons" |
| 2001 | Family Law | Judge | Episode: "The Quality of Mercy" |
| 2001 | Sabrina the Teenage Witch | Betty | Episodes: "Sabrina's Got Spirit" and "Finally!" |
| 2001 | Ally McBeal | Saleswoman | Episode: "The Wedding" |
| 2001 | Curb Your Enthusiasm | Car Customer #3 | Episode: "The Car Salesman" |
| 2001 | The Education of Max Bickford | Joanna | Pilot episode |
| 2002 | Dharma & Greg | Janet | Recurring role, 5 episodes |
| 2002 | Half & Half | Grace | Episode: "The Big Award Episode" |
| 2002 | What I Like About You | Aunt Wanda | Episode: "Thanksgiving" |
| 2002 | Nikki | Salesclerk | Episode: "Welcome to the Rest of Your Life" |
| 2003 | The Jamie Kennedy Experiment | Herself | Episode #2.15 |
| 2003 | Rent Control | Aunt Rose | Television film |
| 2004 | Memron | Janet Kelso | Television film |
| 2004 | 10-8: Officers on Duty | Judge McGonagle | Episode: "Gypsy Road" |
| 2005 | Jake in Progress | Angela | Episode: "Sign Language" |
| 2005 | The War at Home | Vicki's Mom | Pilot episode |
