= Turn of Faith =

2002 film by Charles Jarrott

- poster.
- Directed by: Charles Jarrott
- Written by: Lou Eppolito
- Produced by: Ray Mancini; Louise Runge
- Starring: Ray Mancini; Mia Sara; Costas Mandylor
- Cinematography: Michael Barrett
- Edited by: Robert Pergament
- Music by: Dori Amarilio
- Distributed by: Lightyear Entertainment (United States); Multicom Entertainment Group (non-US)
- Release date: 2002
- Running time: 96 minutes
- Country: United States
- Language: English

Turn of Faith is a 2002 American crime drama film directed by Charles Jarrott and starring Ray Mancini and Mia Sara.

== Plot ==
The film follows three friends, a cop, a priest and a kid from the neighborhood who wants to handle the family business. Then a man named Philly enters the picture and suddenly things become difficult.

== Cast ==
- Ray Mancini as Joey
- Mia Sara as Annmarie De Carlo
- Costas Mandylor as Bobby Giordano
- Alan Gelfant as Father Frank
- Tom Atkins as Charlie Ryan
- Tony Sirico as Carmine
- Charles Durning as Philly
