= Claire-Louise Catterall =

British actress and model

Claire-Louise Catterall is a British beauty queen and model. She has represented her country in the World Model Competition and competed in Miss Universe Great Britain. Catterall was the Miss England representative at Miss Supranational 2010 in Płock, Poland, on 28 August.

Catterall competed for the Miss Cymru International title on 26 January 2013 which she obtained as the overall winner, making her the first Welsh girl to win the title. Catterall secured a place over at the Miss International 2013 final in Chicago. She has won the Miss Cannes Film Festival 2010, Miss Flintshire 2009, Top Model of the World (WBO) and Miss Hawaiian Tropic International 2007 in Las Vegas.

She was announced as the first woman from Monaco to compete in Miss Earth. However, as the Miss Earth season came to rise, she was not able to compete for undisclosed reason.

== Acting ==
She has trained at the Zoe Natheson School of Film Acting, London and the Manchester School of Acting. In 2009 Catterall made her film debut in Terror Nation, written and directed by Shane Darren Mather for Masochist Pictures. She then appeared in The Perfect Love Song, a film directed by music producer Samuel Victor. After winning Miss Flintshire in 2009, she was asked to be part of The Evening Leader News Team, and started writing a regular column for the paper. Catterall has also appeared in Bonded by Blood.
