= Mark Ross (politician) =

American politician

Member of the West Virginia House of Delegates
- In office December 1, 2022 – June 15, 2024
- Succeeded by: Ryan Browning
- Constituency: District 28

Personal details
- Party: Republican

Mark Ross is an American politician from West Virginia. He is a Republican and represented District 28 in the West Virginia House of Delegates from 2022 to 2024.
