= Duncan Catterall =

English cricketer (born 1978)

Cricket information
- Batting: Right-handed
- Bowling: Right-arm medium-fast

Career statistics
Competition	First-class	List A
Matches	4	17
Runs scored	157	94
Batting average	31.40	13.42
100s/50s	0/2	0/0
Top score	60	28
Balls bowled	506	561
Wickets	11	8
Bowling average	28.00	54.37
5 wickets in innings	0	0
10 wickets in match	0	0
Best bowling	4/50	2/24
Catches/stumpings	1/–	3/–
- Source: Cricinfo, 14 April 2023

Duncan Neil Catterall (born 19 September 1978) is an English cricketer who played first-class cricket for Worcestershire and currently plays at minor counties level for Shropshire. He was born in Preston, Lancashire.

After a number of appearances for Worcestershire's Second XI in 1997 and 1998, Catterall made his first-team debut in an AXA League game against Warwickshire near the end of the latter season; he bowled five wicketless overs for 22 and made 5 with the bat. Two days later he made his first-class debut against Somerset, again failing to take a wicket and being dismissed for a duck in his only innings. He finally claimed his first victim in the last AXA League game of the season, when he had Hampshire's Shaun Udal caught by Graeme Hick.

Catterall played only two first-class games in 1999, both in September and against Essex and Middlesex, although he did hit 60 in each of them, and took his maiden first-class wicket (that of Essex's Ronnie Irani). In List A cricket he made four appearances, but took only two wickets in a total of 30 overs and was out for nought in his only innings. 2000 saw him achieve career-best first-class bowling figures of 4-50 against the West Indians. In 2001, his only first-team appearance was in a single one-day match, a record he repeated in 2002.

After leaving Worcestershire at the end of 2002, Catterall moved to play for Shropshire, and scored 152 in his second game, against Herefordshire. As well as being a generally consistent performer in minor counties cricket, he played in several List A matches for Shropshire in the C&G Trophy, although without enormous success, never reaching 30 with the bat or taking more than two wickets in a game. He currently plays for Ombersley Cricket Club in the Birmingham League.

In 2012 Catterall joined Pitmaston Park Badminton Club in Worcester. In 2014 he was elected chairman of the club and made captain of the club's Men's 1 team, which plays in the Worcestershire Badminton Association doubles leagues.
